= 2025 Stanley Cup playoffs =

NHL postseason tournament

Tournament details
- Dates: April 19 – June 17, 2025
- Teams: 16
- Defending champions: Florida Panthers

Final positions
- Champions: Florida Panthers
- Runners-up: Edmonton Oilers

Tournament statistics
- Scoring leader(s): Leon Draisaitl (Oilers) & Connor McDavid (Oilers) (33 points)

Awards
- MVP: Sam Bennett (Panthers)

The 2025 Stanley Cup playoffs was the playoff tournament of the National Hockey League (NHL) for the 2024–25 season. The playoffs began on April 19, 2025, and concluded on June 17, 2025, with the Florida Panthers winning their second Stanley Cup in franchise history, defeating the Edmonton Oilers four games to two in the Stanley Cup Final and for the second consecutive season.

The Winnipeg Jets made the playoffs as the Presidents' Trophy winners with the most points (i.e. best record) during the regular season. They are also the first Canadian-based team since the 2011–12 Vancouver Canucks to win the award. The Toronto Maple Leafs extended their playoff streak to nine years, reaching the playoffs every season since 2017; this became the longest active playoff streak after the Boston Bruins, who were previously tied with them for the longest active playoff streak in the NHL, missed the playoffs for the first time since 2016, snapping an eight-year playoff streak. The New York Rangers became the fourth defending Presidents' Trophy winner to miss the playoffs and the first to do so twice. The Ottawa Senators qualified for the playoffs for the first time since 2017, ending what had been the league's third-longest active playoff drought. For the first time in League history, all four of the U.S.-based Original Six teams missed the playoffs. For the first time since 2017, every team in Eastern Canada (the Montreal Canadiens, Ottawa Senators, and Toronto Maple Leafs) qualified for the playoffs. In addition, five Canadian-based teams qualified for the postseason, the most since the expanded 2020 playoffs, and the most in a 16–team playoff since 2017. For the first time since 2018, all three New York state-based teams missed the playoffs, while for the third consecutive season, both Pennsylvania-based teams missed the playoffs.

For the first time since 2004, three Canadian teams advanced to the second round. For the sixth consecutive season, a Florida-based team reached the Stanley Cup Final. For the first time since 2007, a Canadian-based team advanced to the Finals for the second consecutive season. For the first time since 2012, neither Finals opponent had home-ice advantage in any rounds prior to the Finals. It was also the first rematch of Finals opponents since 2009. Leon Draisaitl became the first player in league history to score four overtime goals in one playoff year.

For the first time since 2016, no series ended in a four-game sweep.

== Playoff seeds ==
This was the tenth year in which the top three teams in each division made the playoffs, along with two wild cards in each conference (for a total of eight playoff teams from each conference).

The following teams qualified for the playoffs:

=== Eastern Conference ===
==== Atlantic Division ====
1. Toronto Maple Leafs, Atlantic Division champions – 108 points
2. Tampa Bay Lightning – 102 points
3. Florida Panthers – 98 points

==== Metropolitan Division ====
1. Washington Capitals, Metropolitan Division champions, Eastern Conference regular season champions — 111 points
2. Carolina Hurricanes – 99 points
3. New Jersey Devils – 91 points

==== Wild Cards ====
1. Ottawa Senators – 97 points
2. Montreal Canadiens – 91 points

=== Western Conference ===
==== Central Division ====
1. Winnipeg Jets, Central Division champions, Western Conference regular season champions, Presidents' Trophy winners – 116 points
2. Dallas Stars – 106 points
3. Colorado Avalanche – 102 points

==== Pacific Division ====
1. Vegas Golden Knights, Pacific Division champions – 110 points
2. Los Angeles Kings – 105 points
3. Edmonton Oilers – 101 points

==== Wild Cards ====
1. Minnesota Wild – 97 points
2. St. Louis Blues – 96 points

== Playoff bracket ==
In each round, teams competed in a best-of-seven series following a 2–2–1–1–1 format (scores in the bracket indicate the number of games won in each best-of-seven series). The team with home ice advantage played at home for games one and two (and games five and seven, if necessary), and the other team played at home for games three and four (and game six, if necessary). The top three teams in each division made the playoffs, along with two wild cards in each conference, for a total of eight teams from each conference.

In the first round, the lower seeded wild card in the conference played against the division winner with the best record while the other wild card played against the other division winner, and both wild cards were de facto #4 seeds. The other series matched the second and third-place teams from the divisions. In the first two rounds, home-ice advantage was awarded to the team with the better seed. Thereafter, it was awarded to the team that had the better regular season record.

First round	Second round
A1	Toronto	4
WC1	Ottawa	2
A1	Toronto	3
A3	Florida	4
A2	Tampa Bay	1
A3	Florida	4
Eastern Conference
M1	Washington	4
WC2	Montreal	1
M1	Washington	1
M2	Carolina	4
M2	Carolina	4
M3	New Jersey	1
C1	Winnipeg	4
WC2	St. Louis	3
C1	Winnipeg	2
C2	Dallas	4
C2	Dallas	4
C3	Colorado	3
Western Conference
P1	Vegas	4
WC1	Minnesota	2
P1	Vegas	1
P3	Edmonton	4
P2	Los Angeles	2
P3	Edmonton	4

Conference finals
A3	Florida	4
M2	Carolina	1
C2	Dallas	1
P3	Edmonton	4

Stanley Cup Final
A3	Florida	4
P3	Edmonton	2

Legend

- A1, A2, A3 – The first, second, and third place teams from the Atlantic Division, respectively
- M1, M2, M3 – The first, second, and third place teams from the Metropolitan Division, respectively
- C1, C2, C3 – The first, second, and third place teams from the Central Division, respectively
- P1, P2, P3 – The first, second, and third place teams from the Pacific Division, respectively
- WC1, WC2 – The first and second place teams in the Wild Card, respectively

== First round ==
=== Eastern Conference first round ===
==== (A1) Toronto Maple Leafs vs. (WC1) Ottawa Senators ====
The Toronto Maple Leafs finished first in the Atlantic Division with 108 points. The Ottawa Senators earned 97 points to finish as the first wild card in the Eastern Conference. This was the fifth playoff meeting between these two rivals with Toronto winning all four previous series. They last met in the 2004 Eastern Conference quarterfinals, which Toronto won in seven games. Ottawa won all three games in this year's regular season series.

The Maple Leafs defeated the Senators in six games. Mitch Marner scored a goal and provided two assists in game one while goaltender Anthony Stolarz made 31 saves to backstop the Maple Leafs to a 6–2 victory. In game two, the Senators came back from a two-goal deficit to tie the game and force overtime, but in overtime Max Domi scored to give the Maple Leafs a 3–2 victory. Game three also required overtime as Maple Leafs defenceman Simon Benoit scored the overtime-winning goal, giving Toronto a 3–2 victory and 3–0 series lead. In game four, the Maple Leafs came back from a two-goal deficit to force overtime, but in the extra period, Jake Sanderson scored to give the Senators a 4–3 victory, staving off elimination to force a fifth game. Senators goaltender Linus Ullmark stopped all 29 shots he faced in game five, forcing a sixth game with a 4–0 shutout. In game six, the Maple Leafs prevented a two-goal comeback from the Senators by scoring the series-winning goal with 5:39 left in the third period to emerge victorious 4–2 and advance to the second round.

April 20	Ottawa Senators	2–6	Toronto Maple Leafs	Scotiabank Arena	Recap
Drake Batherson (1) – 16:18		First period	07:09 – Oliver Ekman-Larsson (1); 12:18 – Mitch Marner (1)
No scoring		Second period	04:07 – pp – John Tavares (1); 07:19 – pp – William Nylander (1)
Ridly Greig (1) – 04:00		Third period	04:45 – Morgan Rielly (1); 13:13 – pp – Matthew Knies (1)
Linus Ullmark 18 saves / 24 shots		Goalie stats	Anthony Stolarz 31 saves / 33 shots

April 22	Ottawa Senators	2–3	OT	Toronto Maple Leafs	Scotiabank Arena	Recap
No scoring		First period		03:43 – Morgan Rielly (2); 08:20 – pp – John Tavares (2)
Brady Tkachuk (1) – pp – 15:41		Second period		No scoring
Adam Gaudette (1) – 14:47		Third period		No scoring
No scoring		First overtime period		03:09 – Max Domi (1)
Linus Ullmark 18 saves / 21 shots		Goalie stats		Anthony Stolarz 26 saves / 28 shots

April 24	Toronto Maple Leafs	3–2	OT	Ottawa Senators	Canadian Tire Centre	Recap
No scoring		First period		No scoring
Matthew Knies (2) – pp – 08:31		Second period		01:38 – pp – Claude Giroux (1)
Auston Matthews (1) – 00:32		Third period		11:22 – Brady Tkachuk (2)
Simon Benoit (1) – 01:19		First overtime period		No scoring
Anthony Stolarz 18 saves / 20 shots		Goalie stats		Linus Ullmark 17 saves / 20 shots

April 26	Toronto Maple Leafs	3–4	OT	Ottawa Senators	Canadian Tire Centre	Recap
John Tavares (3) – 19:05		First period		09:03 – pp – Tim Stutzle (1); 14:11 – sh – Shane Pinto (1)
Matthew Knies (3) – 10:12		Second period		No scoring
Oliver Ekman-Larsson (2) – 14:31		Third period		07:32 – David Perron (1)
No scoring		First overtime period		17:42 – Jake Sanderson (1)
Anthony Stolarz 17 saves / 21 shots		Goalie stats		Linus Ullmark 32 saves / 35 shots

April 29	Ottawa Senators	4–0	Toronto Maple Leafs	Scotiabank Arena	Recap
No scoring		First period	No scoring
Thomas Chabot (1) – 03:46		Second period	No scoring
Dylan Cozens (1) – sh – 08:24; Tim Stutzle (2) – en – 17:09; Brady Tkachuk (3) – en – 19:13		Third period	No scoring
Linus Ullmark 29 saves / 29 shots		Goalie stats	Anthony Stolarz 15 saves / 17 shots

May 1	Toronto Maple Leafs	4–2	Ottawa Senators	Canadian Tire Centre	Recap
Auston Matthews (2) – pp – 18:50		First period	No scoring
William Nylander (2) – 00:43		Second period	07:28 – Brady Tkachuk (4)
Max Pacioretty (1) – 14:21; William Nylander (3) – en – 19:41		Third period	12:40 – David Perron (2)
Anthony Stolarz 21 saves / 23 shots		Goalie stats	Linus Ullmark 19 saves / 22 shots

Toronto won series 4–2

==== (A2) Tampa Bay Lightning vs. (A3) Florida Panthers ====
The Tampa Bay Lightning finished second in the Atlantic Division with 102 points. The Florida Panthers earned 98 points to finish third in the Atlantic. This was the second consecutive and fourth overall playoff meeting between these two rivals with Tampa Bay winning two of the three previous series. Florida won the previous season's Eastern Conference first round series in five games. These teams split their four-game regular season series.

The Panthers defeated the Lightning in five games. In game one, Matthew Tkachuk scored twice and provided an assist for the Panthers, who collected a 6–2 victory in the process. Florida goaltender Sergei Bobrovsky stopped all 19 shots by the Lightning in game two, shutting out Tampa Bay 2–0. Andrei Vasilevskiy made 33 saves for the Lightning in game three who emerged victorious 5–1. In game four, Anton Lundell scored a goal and provided an assist in Florida's 4–2 victory, giving the Panthers a 3–1 series lead. Eetu Luostarinen scored a goal and assisted thrice in game five, giving Florida a 6–3 victory and a second round berth.

April 22	Florida Panthers	6–2	Tampa Bay Lightning	Amalie Arena	Recap
Sam Bennett (1) – 03:44; Sam Reinhart (1) – 19:15		First period	12:21 – pp – Jake Guentzel (1)
Nate Schmidt (1) – 04:41; Matthew Tkachuk (1) – pp – 04:55; Matthew Tkachuk (2) – pp – 09:44		Second period	13:04 – Brayden Point (1)
Nate Schmidt (2) – pp – 05:09		Third period	No scoring
Sergei Bobrovsky 20 saves / 22 shots		Goalie stats	Andrei Vasilevskiy 10 saves / 16 shots

April 24	Florida Panthers	2–0	Tampa Bay Lightning	Amalie Arena	Recap
Nate Schmidt (3) – 04:15		First period	No scoring
No scoring		Second period	No scoring
Sam Bennett (2) – en – 19:56		Third period	No scoring
Sergei Bobrovsky 19 saves / 19 shots		Goalie stats	Andrei Vasilevskiy 21 saves / 22 shots

April 26	Tampa Bay Lightning	5–1	Florida Panthers	Amerant Bank Arena	Recap
Brayden Point (2) – 17:15		First period	02:43 – Matthew Tkachuk (3)
Nick Paul (1) – 13:17		Second period	No scoring
Jake Guentzel (2) – 00:21; Luke Glendening (1) – 14:19; Anthony Cirelli (1) – en – 15:00		Third period	No scoring
Andrei Vasilevskiy 33 saves / 34 shots		Goalie stats	Sergei Bobrovsky 17 saves / 21 shots

April 28	Tampa Bay Lightning	2–4	Florida Panthers	Amerant Bank Arena	Recap
No scoring		First period	No scoring
Mitchell Chaffee (1) – 12:21; Erik Cernak (1) – 12:32		Second period	09:06 – Anton Lundell (1)
No scoring		Third period	16:13 – Aaron Ekblad (1); 16:24 – Seth Jones (1); 18:20 – en – Carter Verhaeghe (1)
Andrei Vasilevskiy 19 saves / 22 shots		Goalie stats	Sergei Bobrovsky 18 saves / 20 shots

April 30	Florida Panthers	6–3	Tampa Bay Lightning	Amalie Arena	Recap
Carter Verhaeghe (2) – pp – 05:21; Anton Lundell (2) – 10:06		First period	02:33 – Gage Goncalves (1); 12:16 – Nick Paul (2)
Aleksander Barkov (1) – 00:52; Sam Bennett (3) – 15:13		Second period	09:57 – pp – Jake Guentzel (3)
Eetu Luostarinen (1) – 13:02; Sam Reinhart (2) – en – 15:36		Third period	No scoring
Sergei Bobrovsky 26 saves / 29 shots		Goalie stats	Andrei Vasilevskiy 25 saves / 30 shots

Florida won series 4–1

==== (M1) Washington Capitals vs. (WC2) Montreal Canadiens ====
The Washington Capitals finished first in the Metropolitan Division and Eastern Conference earning 111 points. The Montreal Canadiens earned 91 points to finish as the second wild card in the Eastern Conference. This was the second playoff meeting between these two teams. Their only previous meeting was in the 2010 Eastern Conference quarterfinals, which Montreal came back from a 3–1 series deficit to defeat Washington in seven games. Washington won two of the three games in this year's regular season series.

The Capitals defeated the Canadiens in five games. In game one, Alexander Ovechkin scored twice, including the overtime-winning goal, for the Capitals, defeating the Canadiens 3–2. Connor McMichael scored twice for the Capitals in game two, giving Washington a 2–0 series lead with a 3–1 victory. Cole Caufield and Alex Newhook both scored a goal and assisted in Montreal's 6–3 victory in game three. In game four, Brandon Duhaime scored twice for the Capitals, defeating the Canadiens 5–2 to take a 3–1 series lead. Goaltender Logan Thompson made 28 saves for Washington in game five, sending the Capitals to the second round with a 4–1 victory.

April 21	Montreal Canadiens	2–3	OT	Washington Capitals	Capital One Arena	Recap
No scoring		First period		18:34 – pp – Alexander Ovechkin (1)
No scoring		Second period		12:09 – Anthony Beauvillier (1)
Cole Caufield (1) – pp – 10:32; Nick Suzuki (1) – 15:45		Third period		No scoring
No scoring		First overtime period		02:26 – Alexander Ovechkin (2)
Sam Montembeault 29 saves / 32 shots		Goalie stats		Logan Thompson 33 saves / 35 shots

April 23	Montreal Canadiens	1–3	Washington Capitals	Capital One Arena	Recap
No scoring		First period	No scoring
Christian Dvorak (1) – 01:16		Second period	03:47 – Connor McMichael (1); 04:47 – Dylan Strome (1)
No scoring		Third period	19:58 – en – Connor McMichael (2)
Sam Montembeault 29 saves / 31 shots		Goalie stats	Logan Thompson 25 saves / 26 shots

April 25	Washington Capitals	3–6	Montreal Canadiens	Bell Centre	Recap
Connor McMichael (3) – 03:20		First period	19:07 – Alexandre Carrier (1)
Jakob Chychrun (1) – 10:47		Second period	08:37 – pp – Nick Suzuki (2); 19:51 – Cole Caufield (2)
Alexander Ovechkin (3) – 02:39		Third period	04:17 – Christian Dvorak (2); 13:23 – Juraj Slafkovsky (1); 17:35 – pp – Alex Newhook (1)
Logan Thompson 30 saves / 35 shots Charlie Lindgren 4 saves / 5 shots		Goalie stats	Sam Montembeault 11 saves / 13 shots Jakub Dobes 7 saves / 8 shots

April 27	Washington Capitals	5–2	Montreal Canadiens	Bell Centre	Recap
No scoring		First period	No scoring
Dylan Strome (2) – 01:25		Second period	10:33 – pp – Juraj Slafkovsky (2); 18:32 – pp – Cole Caufield (3)
Brandon Duhaime (1) – 06:39; Andrew Mangiapane (1) – 16:23; Brandon Duhaime (2) – en – 17:21; Tom Wilson (1) – en – 19:05		Third period	No scoring
Logan Thompson 16 saves / 18 shots		Goalie stats	Jakub Dobes 22 saves / 25 shots

April 30	Montreal Canadiens	1–4	Washington Capitals	Capital One Arena	Recap
No scoring		First period	09:12 – pp – Alexander Ovechkin (4); 11:15 – Jakob Chychrun (2)
No scoring		Second period	16:59 – pp – Tom Wilson (2)
Emil Heineman (1) – 02:40		Third period	19:34 – en Brandon Duhaime (3)
Jakub Dobes 24 saves / 27 shots		Goalie stats	Logan Thompson 28 saves / 29 shots

Washington won series 4–1

==== (M2) Carolina Hurricanes vs. (M3) New Jersey Devils ====
The Carolina Hurricanes finished second in the Metropolitan Division with 99 points. The New Jersey Devils earned 91 points to finish third in the Metropolitan. This was the sixth playoff meeting between these two teams with Carolina winning four of the five previous series. They last met in the 2023 Eastern Conference second round, which Carolina won in five games. These teams split their four-game regular season series.

The Hurricanes defeated the Devils in five games. In game one, Logan Stankoven scored twice for Carolina, defeating New Jersey 4–1. Goaltender Frederik Andersen made 25 saves for the Hurricanes in game two, defeating the Devils 3–1. In game three, the Hurricanes came back from a two-goal deficit and forced overtime, but in double-overtime, Simon Nemec scored for New Jersey to give the Devils a 3–2 victory. Andrei Svechnikov scored a hat trick in game four, leading the Hurricanes to a 5–2 victory. In game five, the Hurricanes came back from a three-goal deficit, along with a one-goal deficit, to force overtime, and in double-overtime, Sebastian Aho scored to send Carolina to the second round with a 5–4 victory.

April 20	New Jersey Devils	1–4	Carolina Hurricanes	Lenovo Center	Recap
No scoring		First period	02:24 – Jalen Chatfield (1)
Nico Hischier (1) – 18:51		Second period	06:37 – Logan Stankoven (1); 13:08 – pp – Logan Stankoven (2)
No scoring		Third period	17:32 – en – Andrei Svechnikov (1)
Jacob Markstrom 41 saves / 44 shots		Goalie stats	Frederik Andersen 23 saves / 24 shots

April 22	New Jersey Devils	1–3	Carolina Hurricanes	Lenovo Center	Recap
Jesper Bratt (1) – 03:51		First period	No scoring
No scoring		Second period	02:57 – Shayne Gostisbehere (1); 05:54 – sh – Jordan Martinook (1)
No scoring		Third period	19:23 – en – Seth Jarvis (1)
Jacob Markstrom 25 saves / 27 shots		Goalie stats	Frederik Andersen 25 saves / 26 shots

April 25	Carolina Hurricanes	2–3	2OT	New Jersey Devils	Prudential Center	Recap
No scoring		First period		16:11 – Nico Hischier (2)
No scoring		Second period		No scoring
Seth Jarvis (2) – pp – 06:11; Sebastian Aho (1) – pp – 12:20		Third period		01:18 – Dawson Mercer (1)
No scoring		Second overtime period		02:36 – Simon Nemec (1)
Frederik Andersen 34 saves / 37 shots		Goalie stats		Jacob Markstrom 25 saves / 27 shots

April 27	Carolina Hurricanes	5–2	New Jersey Devils	Prudential Center	Recap
Andrei Svechnikov (2) – 00:52; Jaccob Slavin (1) – 09:47		First period	No scoring
Andrei Svechnikov (3) – pp – 00:42		Second period	02:45 – Nico Hischier (3); 07:34 – Timo Meier (1)
Brent Burns (1) – 14:14; Andrei Svechnikov (4) – en – 16:43		Third period	No scoring
Frederik Andersen 6 saves / 7 shots Pyotr Kochetkov 14 saves / 15 shots		Goalie stats	Jacob Markstrom 24 saves / 28 shots

April 29	New Jersey Devils	4–5	2OT	Carolina Hurricanes	Lenovo Center	Recap
Dawson Mercer (2) – 03:46; Timo Meier (2) – 05:31; Stefan Noesen (1) – 09:55		First period		No scoring
Nico Hischier (4) – 07:26		Second period		01:46 – Taylor Hall (1); 04:01 – Jackson Blake (1); 05:40 – Andrei Svechnikov (5); 11:27 – pp – Sebastian Aho (2)
No scoring		Third period		No scoring
No scoring		Second overtime period		04:17 – pp – Sebastian Aho (3)
Jacob Markstrom 49 saves / 54 shots		Goalie stats		Pyotr Kochetkov 31 saves / 35 shots

Carolina won series 4–1

=== Western Conference first round ===
==== (C1) Winnipeg Jets vs. (WC2) St. Louis Blues ====
The Winnipeg Jets earned the Presidents' Trophy as the NHL's best regular season team with 116 points. The St. Louis Blues earned 96 points to finish as the second wild card in the Western Conference, winning the tiebreaker against Calgary with 32 RWs. This was the third playoff meeting between these two teams, with St. Louis winning all two previous series. They last met in the 2019 Western Conference first round, which St. Louis won in six games. Winnipeg won three of the four games in this year's regular season series.

The Jets defeated the Blues in seven games, with the home team victorious in every game. In game one, Kyle Connor scored the game-winning goal with 1:36 left in the third period to give the Jets a 5–3 victory. Mark Scheifele scored a goal and provided an assist in game two for the Jets, defeating the Blues 2–1. Pavel Buchnevich scored a hat trick in game three for the Blues, routing the Jets 7–2. Jake Neighbours assisted twice and provided a goal for the Blues in game four, tying the series 2–2 with a 5–1 victory. In game five, Connor provided a goal and two assists in a 5–3 triumph for the Jets, taking a 3–2 series lead. In the second period of game six, St. Louis scored four goals in the span of 5:23, forcing a seventh game with a 5–2 victory. In game seven, the Jets came back from a two-goal deficit, scoring both goals with less than two minutes left in the third period, to force overtime; Cole Perfetti's goal with one point six second's left to force overtime set a new league record for the latest game-tying goal in a seventh game. In double overtime, captain Adam Lowry scored to send the Jets to the second round with a 4–3 victory. This was the longest game seven since the Easter Epic in 1987.

April 19	St. Louis Blues	3–5	Winnipeg Jets	Canada Life Centre	Recap
Robert Thomas (1) – pp – 09:31; Oskar Sundqvist (1) – 18:10		First period	13:38 – pp – Mark Scheifele (1); 15:02 – Jaret Anderson-Dolan (1)
Jordan Kyrou (1) – pp – 01:13		Second period	No scoring
No scoring		Third period	09:18 – Alex Iafallo (1); 18:24 – Kyle Connor (1); 19:07 – en – Adam Lowry (1)
Jordan Binnington 21 saves / 25 shots		Goalie stats	Connor Hellebuyck 14 saves / 17 shots

April 21	St. Louis Blues	1–2	Winnipeg Jets	Canada Life Centre	Recap
Jimmy Snuggerud (1) – pp – 19:58		First period	16:32 – Mark Scheifele (2)
No scoring		Second period	No scoring
No scoring		Third period	01:43 – Kyle Connor (2)
Jordan Binnington 20 saves / 22 shots		Goalie stats	Connor Hellebuyck 21 saves / 22 shots

April 24	Winnipeg Jets	2–7	St. Louis Blues	Enterprise Center	Recap
No scoring		First period	00:48 – Pavel Buchnevich (1); 03:11 – pp – Pavel Buchnevich (2); 15:51 – Cam Fowler (1)
No scoring		Second period	No scoring
David Gustafsson (1) – 04:32; Neal Pionk (1) – pp – 12:50		Third period	05:24 – Pavel Buchnevich (3); 07:56 – pp – Jordan Kyrou (2); 10:32 – Alexey Toropchenko (1); 16:16 – pp –Colton Parayko (1)
Connor Hellebuyck 19 saves / 25 shots Eric Comrie 2 saves / 3 shots		Goalie stats	Jordan Binnington 16 saves / 18 shots

April 27	Winnipeg Jets	1–5	St. Louis Blues	Enterprise Center	Recap
Kyle Connor (3) – 13:58		First period	19:37 – Jake Neighbours (1)
No scoring		Second period	10:46 – Tyler Tucker (1); 17:23 – Brayden Schenn (1); 18:54 – Justin Faulk (1)
No scoring		Third period	02:01 – Robert Thomas (2)
Connor Hellebuyck 13 saves / 18 shots Eric Comrie 6 saves / 6 shots		Goalie stats	Jordan Binnington 30 saves / 31 shots

April 30	St. Louis Blues	3–5	Winnipeg Jets	Canada Life Centre	Recap
Nathan Walker (1) – 03:42		First period	01:23 – Kyle Connor (4); 08:39 – Nino Niederreiter (1)
Jimmy Snuggerud (2) – 06:06		Second period	11:05 – Dylan DeMelo (1); 18:51 – Vladislav Namestnikov (1)
Nathan Walker (2) – 19:07		Third period	16:47 – en – Adam Lowry (2)
Jordan Binnington 21 saves / 25 shots		Goalie stats	Connor Hellebuyck 16 saves / 19 shots

May 2	Winnipeg Jets	2–5	St. Louis Blues	Enterprise Center	Recap
No scoring		First period	06:05 – Philip Broberg (1)
Cole Perfetti (1) – pp – 05:43		Second period	11:34 – Nathan Walker (3); 12:27 – Brayden Schenn (2); 13:40 – Cam Fowler (2); 16:57 – Alexey Toropchenko (2)
Nino Niederreiter (2) – pp – 08:54		Third period	No scoring
Connor Hellebuyck 18 saves / 23 shots Eric Comrie 4 saves / 4 shots		Goalie stats	Jordan Binnington 21 saves / 23 shots

May 4	St. Louis Blues	3–4	2OT	Winnipeg Jets	Canada Life Centre	Recap
Jordan Kyrou (3) – 01:10; Mathieu Joseph (1) – 07:16		First period		No scoring
Radek Faksa (1) – 19:25		Second period		11:41 – pp – Cole Perfetti (2)
No scoring		Third period		18:05 – Vladislav Namestnikov (2); 19:57 – Cole Perfetti (3)
No scoring		Second overtime period		16:08 – Adam Lowry (3)
Jordan Binnington 43 saves / 47 shots		Goalie stats		Connor Hellebuyck 26 saves / 29 shots

Winnipeg won series 4–3

==== (C2) Dallas Stars vs. (C3) Colorado Avalanche ====
The Dallas Stars finished second in the Central Division with 106 points. The Colorado Avalanche earned 102 points to finish third in the Central. This was the second consecutive and seventh overall playoff series between these two teams with Dallas winning four of the six previous playoff series. Dallas won the previous season's Western Conference second round in six games. Colorado won two of the three games in this year's regular season series.

The Stars defeated the Avalanche in seven games. Nathan MacKinnon scored twice and provided an assist for the Avalanche in game one who emerged with a 5–1 victory. The Stars tied the series with game two's victory; Colin Blackwell scored the overtime-winning goal for Dallas to end the game 4–3. In game three, Tyler Seguin provided the overtime game-winning goal for the Stars, defeating the Avalanche 2–1. Mackenzie Blackwood stopped all 23 shots he faced in game four, giving Colorado a 4–0 shutout victory and tying the series 2–2. In game five, both Wyatt Johnston and Mikko Rantanen scored three points in Dallas's 6–2 victory, taking a 3–2 series lead in the process. In game six, the Avalanche prevented a two-goal come back from the Stars with Valeri Nichushkin scoring twice in a 7–4 victory to force a seventh game. Rantanen scored a hat trick in the third period of game seven, becoming the first player in League history to complete the feat. The Stars successfully came back from a two-goal deficit in the third period to defeat the Avalanche 4–2 and advance to the second round. With the win, Stars head coach Peter DeBoer improved his game seven record to 9–0, becoming the sole head coach to have nine seventh game victories.

April 19	Colorado Avalanche	5–1	Dallas Stars	American Airlines Center	Recap
No scoring		First period	No scoring
Artturi Lehkonen (1) – 09:30; Nathan MacKinnon (1) – pp – 16:38		Second period	No scoring
Devon Toews (1) – 12:56; Nathan MacKinnon (2) – en – 16:52; Charlie Coyle (1) – 17:03		Third period	06:45 – pp – Roope Hintz (1)
Mackenzie Blackwood 23 saves / 24 shots		Goalie stats	Jake Oettinger 19 saves / 23 shots

April 21	Colorado Avalanche	3–4	OT	Dallas Stars	American Airlines Center	Recap
Nathan MacKinnon (3) – pp – 08:48		First period		19:06 – pp – Tyler Seguin (1)
Jack Drury (1) – 04:42; Logan O'Connor (1) – 19:27		Second period		03:40 – Thomas Harley (1)
No scoring		Third period		10:13 – Evgenii Dadonov (1)
No scoring		First overtime period		17:46 – Colin Blackwell (1)
Mackenzie Blackwood 35 saves / 39 shots		Goalie stats		Jake Oettinger 34 saves / 37 shots

April 23	Dallas Stars	2–1	OT	Colorado Avalanche	Ball Arena	Recap
No scoring		First period		08:09 – Valeri Nichushkin (1)
No scoring		Second period		No scoring
Jamie Benn (1) – pp – 09:18		Third period		No scoring
Tyler Seguin (2) – 05:31		First overtime period		No scoring
Jake Oettinger 27 saves / 28 shots		Goalie stats		Mackenzie Blackwood 26 saves / 28 shots

April 26	Dallas Stars	0–4	Colorado Avalanche	Ball Arena	Recap
No scoring		First period	12:39 – sh – Logan O'Connor (2); 19:36 – pp – Nathan MacKinnon (4)
No scoring		Second period	13:10 – Gabriel Landeskog (1)
No scoring		Third period	10:46 – Sam Girard (1)
Jake Oettinger 31 saves / 34 shots Casey DeSmith 13 saves / 14 shots		Goalie stats	Mackenzie Blackwood 23 saves / 23 shots

April 28	Colorado Avalanche	2–6	Dallas Stars	American Airlines Center	Recap
No scoring		First period	00:09 – Wyatt Johnston (1); 19:15 – Thomas Harley (2)
Artturi Lehkonen (2) – 12:11; Nathan MacKinnon (5) – 14:38		Second period	01:12 – Mikko Rantanen (1); 16:48 – pp – Wyatt Johnston (2); 18:32 – Mason Marchment (1)
No scoring		Third period	17:55 – en – Roope Hintz (2)
Mackenzie Blackwood 13 saves / 18 shots Scott Wedgewood 8 saves / 8 shots		Goalie stats	Jake Oettinger 26 saves / 28 shots

May 1	Dallas Stars	4–7	Colorado Avalanche	Ball Arena	Recap
No scoring		First period	06:29 – Valeri Nichushkin (2); 18:40 – Artturi Lehkonen (3)
Roope Hintz (3) – pp – 01:18; Mikael Granlund (1) – 03:41; Roope Hintz (4) – 07:51; Mikko Rantanen (2) – 18:35		Second period	04:34 – Martin Necas (1)
No scoring		Third period	06:02 – Valeri Nichushkin (3); 09:04 – Nathan MacKinnon (6); 18:44 – en – Josh Manson (1); 19:03 – en – Cale Makar (1)
Jake Oettinger 41 saves / 46 shots		Goalie stats	Mackenzie Blackwood 22 saves / 26 shots

May 3	Colorado Avalanche	2–4	Dallas Stars	American Airlines Center	Recap
No scoring		First period	No scoring
Josh Manson (2) – sh – 09:50		Second period	No scoring
Nathan MacKinnon (7) – 00:31		Third period	07:49 – Mikko Rantanen (3); 13:46 – pp – Mikko Rantanen (4); 16:04 – pp – Wyatt Johnston (3); 19:57 – en – Mikko Rantanen (5)
Mackenzie Blackwood 15 saves / 18 shots		Goalie stats	Jake Oettinger 25 saves / 27 shots

Dallas won series 4–3

==== (P1) Vegas Golden Knights vs. (WC1) Minnesota Wild ====
The Vegas Golden Knights finished first in the Pacific Division with 110 points. The Minnesota Wild earned 97 points to finish as the first wild card in the Western Conference. This was the second playoff meeting between these two teams. Their only previous meeting was in the 2021 West Division first round, which Vegas won in seven games after giving up a 3–1 series lead. Vegas won all three games in this year's regular season series.

The Golden Knights defeated the Wild in six games. Tomas Hertl scored a goal and provided an assist in Vegas's 4–2 victory in game one. Kirill Kaprizov scored twice and provided an assist for the Wild in game two to defeat the Golden Knights 5–2 and tie the series 1–1. In game three, Filip Gustavsson made 30 saves for the Wild in a 5–2 victory. Game four required overtime; Golden Knights forward Ivan Barbashev scored to end the sudden-death period with a 4–3 victory. Game five also required overtime, wherein Brett Howden scored for Vegas to give them a 3–2 win and 3–2 series lead. Three Vegas players provided two points in game six to send the Golden Knights to the second round with a 3–2 victory.

April 20	Minnesota Wild	2–4	Vegas Golden Knights	T-Mobile Arena	Recap
Matt Boldy (1) – 17:42		First period	15:22 – Tomas Hertl (1)
No scoring		Second period	13:33 – pp – Pavel Dorofeyev (1)
Matt Boldy (2) – 11:46		Third period	02:28 – Brett Howden (1); 19:59 – pp-en – Brett Howden (2)
Filip Gustavsson 23 saves / 26 shots		Goalie stats	Adin Hill 18 saves / 20 shots

April 22	Minnesota Wild	5–2	Vegas Golden Knights	T-Mobile Arena	Recap
Matt Boldy (3) – 09:56; Marcus Foligno (1) – 11:35; Mats Zuccarello (1) – 17:15		First period	No scoring
Kirill Kaprizov (1) – 03:59		Second period	12:04 – Noah Hanifin (1)
Kirill Kaprizov (2) – en – 17:34		Third period	02:26 – Tomas Hertl (2)
Filip Gustavsson 30 saves / 32 shots		Goalie stats	Adin Hill 12 saves / 16 shots

April 24	Vegas Golden Knights	2–5	Minnesota Wild	Xcel Energy Center	Recap
Alex Pietrangelo (1) – 10:48		First period	03:13 – pp – Kirill Kaprizov (3); 06:51 – Marco Rossi (1)
No scoring		Second period	11:05 – Matt Boldy (4); 19:58 – pp – Kirill Kaprizov (4)
Reilly Smith (1) – sh – 11:34		Third period	18:27 – sh-en – Marcus Foligno (2)
Adin Hill 17 saves / 21 shots Akira Schmid 9 saves / 9 shots		Goalie stats	Filip Gustavsson 30 saves / 32 shots

April 26	Vegas Golden Knights	4–3	OT	Minnesota Wild	Xcel Energy Center	Recap
Shea Theodore (1) – pp – 06:47		First period		10:43 – Marco Rossi (2)
No scoring		Second period		01:24 – Marcus Foligno (3)
Nicolas Roy (1) – pp – 04:50; Tomas Hertl (3) – 10:03		Third period		10:57 – Jared Spurgeon (1)
Ivan Barbashev (1) – 17:26		First overtime period		No scoring
Adin Hill 29 saves / 32 shots		Goalie stats		Filip Gustavsson 42 saves / 46 shots

April 29	Minnesota Wild	2–3	OT	Vegas Golden Knights	T-Mobile Arena	Recap
Kirill Kaprizov (5) – pp – 08:38		First period		08:25 – sh – William Karlsson (1); 13:24 – Mark Stone (1)
No scoring		Second period		No scoring
Matt Boldy (5) – 03:31		Third period		No scoring
No scoring		First overtime period		04:05 – Brett Howden (3)
Filip Gustavsson 23 saves / 25 shots Marc-Andre Fleury 6 saves / 7 shots		Goalie stats		Adin Hill 20 saves / 22 shots

May 1	Vegas Golden Knights	3–2	Minnesota Wild	Xcel Energy Center	Recap
Shea Theodore (2) – pp – 03:30		First period	19:56 – Ryan Hartman (1)
Jack Eichel (1) – 16:12		Second period	No scoring
Mark Stone (2) – 16:02		Third period	16:33 – Ryan Hartman (2)
Adin Hill 29 saves / 31 shots		Goalie stats	Filip Gustavsson 20 saves / 23 shots

Vegas won series 4–2

==== (P2) Los Angeles Kings vs. (P3) Edmonton Oilers ====
The Los Angeles Kings finished second in the Pacific Division with 105 points. The Edmonton Oilers earned 101 points to finish third in the Pacific. This was the fourth consecutive and eleventh overall playoff meeting between these two rivals with Edmonton winning eight of the ten previous series as well as the previous six series. Edmonton won the previous season's Western Conference first round series in five games. Los Angeles won three of the four games in this year's regular season series.

The Oilers defeated the Kings in six games after trailing 2–0. Although the Kings gave up a four-goal lead in game one, Phillip Danault's second goal of the game in the final minute of the third period sealed a 6–5 victory for Los Angeles. In game two, Anze Kopitar and Adrian Kempe both had four points against the Oilers, defeating Edmonton 6–2. The Oilers gave up an early two-goal lead in game three and eventually trailed heading into the final period, before they rallied and scored four times, including two in 10 seconds, in the third period that was buoyed by Jim Hiller's failed coach's challenge, allowing Edmonton to obtain a 7–4 victory. In game four, Edmonton came back from a two-goal deficit to force overtime and in the extra period, Leon Draisaitl scored to give the Oilers a 4–3 victory, tying the series 2–2. The Oilers put 44 shots on the Kings in game five, scoring three times to get a 3–1 triumph and a 3–2 series lead. In game six, Connor Brown assisted twice and scored a goal for the Oilers, defeating the Kings for the fourth consecutive season with a 6–4 victory.

April 21	Edmonton Oilers	5–6	Los Angeles Kings	Crypto.com Arena	Recap
No scoring		First period	02:49 – pp – Andrei Kuzmenko (1); 19:27 – Quinton Byfield (1)
Leon Draisaitl (1) – 19:54		Second period	14:47 – Adrian Kempe (1); 17:43 – Phillip Danault (1)
Mattias Janmark (1) – 02:19; Corey Perry (1) – 07:43; Zach Hyman (1) – 17:56; Connor McDavid (1) –18:32		Third period	04:59 – pp – Kevin Fiala (1); 19:18 – Phillip Danault (2)
Stuart Skinner 24 saves / 30 shots		Goalie stats	Darcy Kuemper 20 saves / 25 shots

April 23	Edmonton Oilers	2–6	Los Angeles Kings	Crypto.com Arena	Recap
No scoring		First period	08:44 – pp – Brandt Clarke (1)
Leon Draisaitl (2) – 13:54		Second period	04:14 – Quinton Byfield (2); 10:37 – pp – Andrei Kuzmenko (2)
Viktor Arvidsson (1) – 04:05		Third period	06:46 – Adrian Kempe (2); 09:07 – pp – Anze Kopitar (1); 11:09 – Adrian Kempe (3)
Stuart Skinner 23 saves / 28 shots Calvin Pickard 2 saves / 3 shots		Goalie stats	Darcy Kuemper 24 saves / 26 shots

April 25	Los Angeles Kings	4–7	Edmonton Oilers	Rogers Place	Recap
Adrian Kempe (4) – 17:18		First period	02:49 – Ryan Nugent-Hopkins (1); 08:43 – pp – Evan Bouchard (1)
Kevin Fiala (2) – pp – 05:43; Drew Doughty (1) – pp – 15:07; Trevor Moore (1) – 17:28		Second period	17:19 – Connor Brown (1)
No scoring		Third period	13:18 – Evander Kane (1); 13:28 – pp – Evan Bouchard (2); 18:20 – en – Connor McDavid (2); 19:52 – en – Connor Brown (2)
Darcy Kuemper 30 saves / 35 shots		Goalie stats	Calvin Pickard 24 saves / 28 shots

April 27	Los Angeles Kings	3–4	OT	Edmonton Oilers	Rogers Place	Recap
Trevor Moore (2) – 10:35		First period		No scoring
Warren Foegele (1) – 01:31; Kevin Fiala (3) – 07:32		Second period		04:11 – pp – Corey Perry (2)
No scoring		Third period		07:51 – Evan Bouchard (3); 19:31 – Evan Bouchard (4)
No scoring		First overtime period		18:18 – pp – Leon Draisaitl (3)
Darcy Kuemper 44 saves / 48 shots		Goalie stats		Calvin Pickard 38 saves / 41 shots

April 29	Edmonton Oilers	3–1	Los Angeles Kings	Crypto.com Arena	Recap
No scoring		First period	No scoring
Evander Kane (2) –06:16		Second period	03:33 – pp – Andrei Kuzmenko (3)
Mattias Janmark (2) – 07:12; Ryan Nugent-Hopkins (2) – en – 19:02		Third period	No scoring
Calvin Pickard 21 saves / 22 shots		Goalie stats	Darcy Kuemper 43 saves / 45 shots

May 1	Los Angeles Kings	4–6	Edmonton Oilers	Rogers Place	Recap
Quinton Byfield (3) – 01:19; Brandt Clarke (2) – 03:37		First period	03:04 – Adam Henrique (1); 05:55 – pp – Ryan Nugent-Hopkins (3); 12:49 – Zach Hyman (2)
Jordan Spence (1) – 18:01		Second period	14:59 – Darnell Nurse (1); 16:35 – Trent Frederic (1)
Anze Kopitar (2) – 19:05		Third period	19:58 – en – Connor Brown (3)
Darcy Kuemper 23 saves / 28 shots		Goalie stats	Calvin Pickard 23 saves / 27 shots

Edmonton won series 4–2

== Second round ==
=== Eastern Conference second round ===
==== (A1) Toronto Maple Leafs vs. (A3) Florida Panthers ====
This was the second playoff meeting between these two teams; their only previous meeting was in the 2023 Eastern Conference second round, which Florida won in five games. Florida won three of the four games in this year's regular season series.

The Panthers defeated the Maple Leafs in seven games. In game one, William Nylander scored twice for Toronto as the Maple Leafs held off a third period rally from the Panthers for a 5–4 victory. Three Toronto players provided two points in game two, edging out Florida 4–3 for a 2–0 series lead. In game three, the Panthers came back from a two-goal deficit to force overtime where Brad Marchand scored to give Florida a 5–4 victory. Florida goaltender Sergei Bobrovsky stopped all 23 shots in game four, tying the series with a 2–0 shutout. Bobrovsky made 31 saves in game five as the Panthers routed the Maple Leafs 6–1 to take a 3–2 series lead. Maple Leafs goaltender Joseph Woll stopped all 22 shots he faced in game six to force a seventh game with a 2–0 shutout. In game seven, Marchand scored a goal and provided two assists for the Panthers, defeating Toronto 6–1 to clinch their third consecutive Eastern Conference finals berth.

May 5	Florida Panthers	4–5	Toronto Maple Leafs	Scotiabank Arena	Recap
Seth Jones (2) – pp – 16:57		First period	00:33 – William Nylander (4); 12:51 – William Nylander (5); 17:16 – Morgan Rielly (3)
No scoring		Second period	07:50 – Christopher Tanev (1)
Eetu Luostarinen (2) – 01:39; Uvis Balinskis (1) – 04:30; Sam Bennett (4) – 18:05		Third period	14:00 – Matthew Knies (4)
Sergei Bobrovsky 24 saves / 29 shots		Goalie stats	Anthony Stolarz 8 saves / 9 shots Joseph Woll 17 saves / 20 shots

May 7	Florida Panthers	3–4	Toronto Maple Leafs	Scotiabank Arena	Recap
Aleksander Barkov (2) – pp – 10:58		First period	18:19 – pp – Max Pacioretty (2)
Brad Marchand (1) – 00:15		Second period	04:18 – William Nylander (6); 17:09 – Max Domi (2)
Anton Lundell (3) – 05:33		Third period	05:50 – Mitch Marner (2)
Sergei Bobrovsky 16 saves / 20 shots		Goalie stats	Joseph Woll 25 saves / 28 shots

May 9	Toronto Maple Leafs	4–5	OT	Florida Panthers	Amerant Bank Arena	Recap
Matthew Knies (5) – 00:23; John Tavares (4) – 05:57		First period		07:38 – Aleksander Barkov (3)
John Tavares (5) – pp – 02:52		Second period		04:13 – Sam Reinhart (3); 05:17 – Carter Verhaeghe (3); 15:07 – Jonah Gadjovich (1)
Morgan Rielly (4) – 10:56		Third period		No scoring
No scoring		First overtime period		15:27 – Brad Marchand (2)
Joseph Woll 31 saves / 36 shots		Goalie stats		Sergei Bobrovsky 27 saves / 31 shots

May 11	Toronto Maple Leafs	0–2	Florida Panthers	Amerant Bank Arena	Recap
No scoring		First period	15:45 – pp – Carter Verhaeghe (4)
No scoring		Second period	No scoring
No scoring		Third period	12:09 – Sam Bennett (5)
Joseph Woll 35 saves / 37 shots		Goalie stats	Sergei Bobrovsky 23 saves / 23 shots

May 14	Florida Panthers	6–1	Toronto Maple Leafs	Scotiabank Arena	Recap
Aaron Ekblad (2) – 14:38		First period	No scoring
Dmitry Kulikov (1) – 06:08; Jesper Boqvist (1) – 10:05; Niko Mikkola (1) – 14:01		Second period	No scoring
A. J. Greer (1) – 06:23; Sam Bennett (6) – pp – 09:10		Third period	18:54 – Nicholas Robertson (1)
Sergei Bobrovsky 31 saves / 32 shots		Goalie stats	Joseph Woll 20 saves / 25 shots Matt Murray 6 saves / 7 shots

May 16	Toronto Maple Leafs	2–0	Florida Panthers	Amerant Bank Arena	Recap
No scoring		First period	No scoring
No scoring		Second period	No scoring
Auston Matthews (3) – 06:20; Max Pacioretty (3) – 14:17		Third period	No scoring
Joseph Woll 22 saves / 22 shots		Goalie stats	Sergei Bobrovsky 15 saves / 17 shots

May 18	Florida Panthers	6–1	Toronto Maple Leafs	Scotiabank Arena	Recap
No scoring		First period	No scoring
Seth Jones (3) – 03:15; Anton Lundell (4) – 07:18; Jonah Gadjovich (2) – 09:39		Second period	No scoring
Eetu Luostarinen (3) – 02:54; Sam Reinhart (4) – 09:24; Brad Marchand (3) – en – 16:57		Third period	02:07 – Max Domi (3)
Sergei Bobrovsky 19 saves / 20 shots		Goalie stats	Joseph Woll 28 saves / 33 shots

Florida won series 4–3

==== (M1) Washington Capitals vs. (M2) Carolina Hurricanes ====
This was the second playoff meeting between these two teams; their only previous meeting was in the 2019 Eastern Conference first round, which Carolina won in seven games. These teams split the four games in this year's regular season series.

The Hurricanes defeated the Capitals in five games. Game one required overtime; in the extra period, Jaccob Slavin scored to give Carolina a 2–1 victory. In game two, Logan Thompson made 27 saves for the Capitals, backstopping Washington to a 3–1 triumph. Hurricanes goaltender Frederik Andersen stopped all 21 shots he faced in game three, shutting out the Capitals 4–0. Sean Walker and Taylor Hall both scored a goal and provided an assist for the Hurricanes in game four, who defeated the Capitals 5–2 to take a 3–1 series lead. Andrei Svechnikov broke a 1–1 tie for the Hurricanes in game five, scoring with less than two minutes left in the third period, allowing Carolina to advance to the Eastern Conference final with a 3–1 victory.

May 6	Carolina Hurricanes	2–1	OT	Washington Capitals	Capital One Arena	Recap
No scoring		First period		No scoring
No scoring		Second period		03:53 – Aliaksei Protas (1)
Logan Stankoven (3) – 09:42		Third period		No scoring
Jaccob Slavin (2) – 03:06		First overtime period		No scoring
Frederik Andersen 13 saves / 14 shots		Goalie stats		Logan Thompson 31 saves / 33 shots

May 8	Carolina Hurricanes	1–3	Washington Capitals	Capital One Arena	Recap
No scoring		First period	No scoring
No scoring		Second period	02:16 – Connor McMichael (4)
Shayne Gostisbehere (2) – pp – 09:26		Third period	01:54 – pp – John Carlson (1); 19:00 – en – Tom Wilson (3)
Frederik Andersen 17 saves / 20 shots		Goalie stats	Logan Thompson 27 saves / 28 shots

May 10	Washington Capitals	0–4	Carolina Hurricanes	Lenovo Center	Recap
No scoring		First period	No scoring
No scoring		Second period	12:34 – Andrei Svechnikov (6); 18:57 – pp – Jack Roslovic (1)
No scoring		Third period	03:14 – Eric Robinson (1); 16:44 – pp – Jackson Blake (2)
Logan Thompson 24 saves / 28 shots		Goalie stats	Frederik Andersen 21 saves / 21 shots

May 12	Washington Capitals	2–5	Carolina Hurricanes	Lenovo Center	Recap
No scoring		First period	10:24 – Shayne Gostisbehere (3)
No scoring		Second period	01:05 – Seth Jarvis (3)
Jakob Chychrun (3) – 05:18; Alexander Ovechkin (5) – pp – 12:14		Third period	08:24 – Taylor Hall (2); 16:45 – Sean Walker (1); 17:39 – en – Andrei Svechnikov (7)
Logan Thompson 32 saves / 36 shots		Goalie stats	Frederik Andersen 19 saves / 21 shots

May 15	Carolina Hurricanes	3–1	Washington Capitals	Capital One Arena	Recap
Jordan Staal (1) – 09:38		First period	13:41 – Anthony Beauvillier (2)
No scoring		Second period	No scoring
Andrei Svechnikov (8) – 18:01; Seth Jarvis (4) – en – 19:33		Third period	No scoring
Frederik Andersen 18 saves / 19 shots		Goalie stats	Logan Thompson 18 saves / 20 shots

Carolina won series 4–1

=== Western Conference second round ===
==== (C1) Winnipeg Jets vs. (C2) Dallas Stars ====
This was the first playoff meeting between these two teams. Winnipeg won three of the four games in this year's regular season series.

The Stars defeated the Jets in six games. Mikko Rantanen scored all three goals for the Stars in game one, scoring the hat trick within the second period of a 3–2 victory. Nikolaj Ehlers scored twice and provided an assist in Connor Hellebuyck's 21-save shutout for the Jets, tying the series 1–1 with a 4–0 win. In game three, Rantanen scored a goal and assisted twice for the Stars, defeating the Jets 5–2. Mikael Granlund scored all three goals for the Stars in game four, earning a hat trick in a 3–1 victory to take a 3–1 series lead. In game five, Hellebuyck continued his home shutout streak stopping all 22 shots he faced to force a sixth game. Game six required overtime and Thomas Harley scored for the Stars, sending Dallas to their third consecutive conference finals appearance with a 2–1 victory.

May 7	Dallas Stars	3–2	Winnipeg Jets	Canada Life Centre	Recap
No scoring		First period	No scoring
Mikko Rantanen (6) – 08:43; Mikko Rantanen (7) – 14:21; Mikko Rantanen (8) – pp – 16:38		Second period	03:30 – Nino Niederreiter (3); 17:35 – Mark Scheifele (3)
No scoring		Third period	No scoring
Jake Oettinger 29 saves / 31 shots		Goalie stats	Connor Hellebuyck 21 saves / 24 shots

May 9	Dallas Stars	0–4	Winnipeg Jets	Canada Life Centre	Recap
No scoring		First period	03:35 – pp – Gabriel Vilardi (1); 07:07 – Nikolaj Ehlers (1)
No scoring		Second period	11:02 – Adam Lowry (4)
No scoring		Third period	16:20 – en – Nikolaj Ehlers (2)
Jake Oettinger 21 saves / 24 shots		Goalie stats	Connor Hellebuyck 21 saves / 21 shots

May 11	Winnipeg Jets	2–5	Dallas Stars	American Airlines Center	Recap
Kyle Connor (5) – 09:53		First period	02:27 – pp – Roope Hintz (5); 15:12 – Thomas Harley (3)
Nino Niederreiter (4) – 10:07		Second period	No scoring
No scoring		Third period	03:51 – Alex Petrovic (1); 04:40 – Mikko Rantanen (9); 14:05 – Wyatt Johnston (4)
Connor Hellebuyck 21 saves / 26 shots		Goalie stats	Jake Oettinger 23 saves / 25 shots

May 13	Winnipeg Jets	1–3	Dallas Stars	American Airlines Center	Recap
No scoring		First period	08:36 – pp – Mikael Granlund (2)
Nikolaj Ehlers (3) – 01:02		Second period	17:52 – Mikael Granlund (3)
No scoring		Third period	07:23 – pp – Mikael Granlund (4)
Connor Hellebuyck 21 saves / 24 shots		Goalie stats	Jake Oettinger 31 saves / 32 shots

May 15	Dallas Stars	0–4	Winnipeg Jets	Canada Life Centre	Recap
No scoring		First period	No scoring
No scoring		Second period	06:17 – Mark Scheifele (4)
No scoring		Third period	02:20 – pp – Nikolaj Ehlers (4); 12:07 – pp – Vladislav Namestnikov (3); 19:15 – en – Nikolaj Ehlers (5)
Jake Oettinger 31 saves / 34 shots		Goalie stats	Connor Hellebuyck 22 saves / 22 shots

May 17	Winnipeg Jets	1–2	OT	Dallas Stars	American Airlines Center	Recap
No scoring		First period		No scoring
Mark Scheifele (5) – 05:28		Second period		11:12 – Sam Steel (1)
No scoring		Third period		No scoring
No scoring		First overtime period		01:33 – pp – Thomas Harley (4)
Connor Hellebuyck 18 saves / 20 shots		Goalie stats		Jake Oettinger 22 saves / 23 shots

Dallas won series 4–2

==== (P1) Vegas Golden Knights vs. (P3) Edmonton Oilers ====
This was the second playoff meeting between these two teams; their only previous meeting was in the 2023 Western Conference second round, which Vegas won in six games. These teams split their four-game regular season series.

The Oilers defeated the Golden Knights in five games. In game one, the Oilers scored twice in the final four minutes of the game, holding off the Golden Knights for a 4–2 victory. The Oilers gave up a two-goal lead in the third period of game two, but recovered in overtime with Leon Draisaitl scoring the overtime-winning goal to give Edmonton a 5–4 victory. In game three, the Golden Knights came back from a two-goal deficit and with 0.4 seconds remaining in the game, Reilly Smith scored to give Vegas a 4–3 victory. The goal was the third-latest game-winning goal in regulation in NHL playoff history. Adam Henrique scored twice and Stuart Skinner stopped all 23 shots for the Oilers in game four, defeating the Golden Knights 3–0 to take a 3–1 series lead. In game five, neither team scored in regulation, setting up an overtime period where Kasperi Kapanen scored to send Edmonton to the Western Conference final for the second consecutive season.

May 6	Edmonton Oilers	4–2	Vegas Golden Knights	T-Mobile Arena	Recap
Corey Perry (3) – 16:26		First period	02:13 – pp – Mark Stone (3); 09:03 – Mark Stone (4)
No scoring		Second period	No scoring
Leon Draisaitl (4) – 00:57; Zach Hyman (3) – 16:58; Connor Brown (4) – 18:14		Third period	No scoring
Calvin Pickard 15 saves / 17 shots		Goalie stats	Adin Hill 24 saves / 28 shots

May 8	Edmonton Oilers	5–4	OT	Vegas Golden Knights	T-Mobile Arena	Recap
No scoring		First period		08:42 – pp – Victor Olofsson (1)
Jake Walman (1) – 11:31; Vasily Podkolzin (1) – 15:18; Darnell Nurse (2) – 17:17		Second period		18:10 – William Karlsson (2)
Evander Kane (3) – 01:52		Third period		04:32 – pp – Victor Olofsson (2); 11:58 – Alex Pietrangelo (2)
Leon Draisaitl (5) – 15:20		First overtime period		No scoring
Calvin Pickard 28 saves / 32 shots		Goalie stats		Adin Hill 32 saves / 37 shots

May 10	Vegas Golden Knights	4–3	Edmonton Oilers	Rogers Place	Recap
Nicolas Roy (2) – 15:17; Reilly Smith (2) – 16:11		First period	07:19 – Corey Perry (4); 11:12 – pp – Corey Perry (5)
William Karlsson (3) – 17:05		Second period	No scoring
Reilly Smith (3) – 19:59		Third period	16:58 – Connor McDavid (3)
Adin Hill 17 saves / 20 shots		Goalie stats	Stuart Skinner 20 saves / 24 shots

May 12	Vegas Golden Knights	0–3	Edmonton Oilers	Rogers Place	Recap
No scoring		First period	01:27 – Adam Henrique (2); 13:03 – Adam Henrique (3)
No scoring		Second period	07:38 – Evander Kane (4)
No scoring		Third period	No scoring
Adin Hill 29 saves / 32 shots		Goalie stats	Stuart Skinner 23 saves / 23 shots

May 14	Edmonton Oilers	1–0	OT	Vegas Golden Knights	T-Mobile Arena	Recap
No scoring		First period		No scoring
No scoring		Second period		No scoring
No scoring		Third period		No scoring
Kasperi Kapanen (1) – 07:14		First overtime period		No scoring
Stuart Skinner 24 saves / 24 shots		Goalie stats		Adin Hill 30 saves / 31 shots

Edmonton won series 4–1

== Conference finals ==
=== Eastern Conference final ===
==== (M2) Carolina Hurricanes vs. (A3) Florida Panthers ====
This was the second playoff meeting between these two teams. Their only previous playoff meeting was in the 2023 Eastern Conference final, also the Hurricanes' most recent conference finals appearance, which Florida won in a four-game sweep. Carolina appeared in their sixth conference finals. This was Florida's third consecutive conference finals appearance and fourth overall. They won the previous season's conference finals against the New York Rangers in six games. Florida won two of the three games in this year's regular season series.

The Panthers defeated the Hurricanes in five games. In game one, Sergei Bobrovsky made 31 saves for the Panthers, backstopping Florida to a 5–2 victory. Bobrovsky stopped all 17 shots he faced in game two as Sam Bennett scored twice to help Florida win 5–0. Florida captain Aleksander Barkov scored twice and provided an assist in game three as the Panthers scored five goals in the third period to defeat Carolina 6–2 to take a 3–0 series lead. Hurricanes goaltender Frederik Andersen stopped all 20 shots by the Panthers in game four, forcing a fifth game with a 3–0 shutout win as the Hurricanes broke their 15-game conference final losing streak dating back to 2009. In game five, the Panthers overcame a two-goal deficit with Carter Verhaeghe providing the series-winning goal in the third period, advancing his team to the Finals for the third consecutive season with a 5–3 victory.

May 20	Florida Panthers	5–2	Carolina Hurricanes	Lenovo Center	Recap
Carter Verhaeghe (5) – pp – 08:30; Aaron Ekblad (3) – 12:29		First period	19:44 – Sebastian Aho (4)
A. J. Greer (2) – 03:33		Second period	No scoring
Sam Bennett (7) – pp – 06:08; Eetu Luostarinen (4) –14:55		Third period	16:19 – pp – Jackson Blake (3)
Sergei Bobrovsky 31 saves / 33 shots		Goalie stats	Frederik Andersen 15 saves / 20 shots

May 22	Florida Panthers	5–0	Carolina Hurricanes	Lenovo Center	Recap
Gustav Forsling (1) – 01:17; Matthew Tkachuk (4) – 11:41; Sam Bennett (8) – pp – 15:50		First period	No scoring
Sam Bennett (9) – 19:21		Second period	No scoring
Aleksander Barkov (4) – pp – 13:49		Third period	No scoring
Sergei Bobrovsky 17 saves / 17 shots		Goalie stats	Frederik Andersen 12 saves / 16 shots Pyotr Kochetkov 4 saves / 5 shots

May 24	Carolina Hurricanes	2–6	Florida Panthers	Amerant Bank Arena	Recap
No scoring		First period	12:07 – Niko Mikkola (2)
Logan Stankoven (4) – pp – 14:51		Second period	No scoring
Seth Jarvis (5) – pp – 11:01		Third period	01:29 – Jesper Boqvist (2); 06:26 – Niko Mikkola (3); 06:55 – Aleksander Barkov (5); 09:31 – Aleksander Barkov (6); 10:37 – Brad Marchand (4)
Pyotr Kochetkov 22 saves / 28 shots		Goalie stats	Sergei Bobrovsky 23 saves / 25 shots

May 26	Carolina Hurricanes	3–0	Florida Panthers	Amerant Bank Arena	Recap
No scoring		First period	No scoring
Logan Stankoven (5) – 10:45		Second period	No scoring
Sebastian Aho (5) – en – 17:49; Jordan Staal (2) – en – 18:15		Third period	No scoring
Frederik Andersen 20 saves / 20 shots		Goalie stats	Sergei Bobrovsky 25 saves / 26 shots

May 28	Florida Panthers	5–3	Carolina Hurricanes	Lenovo Center	Recap
No scoring		First period	04:39 – Sebastian Aho (6); 18:54 – Sebastian Aho (7)
Matthew Tkachuk (5) – pp – 07:23; Evan Rodrigues (1) – 07:53; Anton Lundell (5) – 11:59		Second period	No scoring
Carter Verhaeghe (6) – 12:21; Sam Bennett (10) – en – 19:06		Third period	08:30 – Seth Jarvis (6)
Sergei Bobrovsky 20 saves / 23 shots		Goalie stats	Frederik Andersen 17 saves / 21 shots

Florida won series 4–1

=== Western Conference final ===
==== (C2) Dallas Stars vs. (P3) Edmonton Oilers ====
This was the second consecutive and tenth overall playoff meeting between these two teams with Dallas winning six of the nine previous series, as well as a rematch of previous season's Western Conference finals series, which Edmonton won in six games. This was the third consecutive and twelfth overall semifinals/conference finals appearance for the Stars since the league began using a 16-team or greater playoff format in 1980. Edmonton made their second consecutive and twelfth overall conference finals appearance. Dallas won two of the three games in this year's regular season series.

The Oilers defeated the Stars in five games. In game one, the Stars scored five goals in the third period to come back from a two-goal deficit to win 6–3. Stuart Skinner stopped all 25 shots he faced for the Oilers in game two, shutting out the Stars 3–0. Skinner made 33 saves and three Oilers players provided three points in game three, giving Edmonton a 6–1 victory. In game four, Corey Perry and Leon Draisaitl each scored a goal and provided an assist for Edmonton's 4–1 victory, taking a 3–1 series lead in the process. Connor McDavid scored a goal and provided an assist for the Oilers in game five, sending Edmonton to the Finals for the second consecutive season with a 6–3 victory.

May 21	Edmonton Oilers	3–6	Dallas Stars	American Airlines Center	Recap
Leon Draisaitl (6) – 10:19		First period	15:22 – Tyler Seguin (3)
Ryan Nugent-Hopkins (4) – pp – 06:08; Evan Bouchard (5) – 07:48		Second period	No scoring
No scoring		Third period	00:32 – pp – Miro Heiskanen (1); 03:49 – pp – Mikael Granlund (5); 05:58 – pp – Matt Duchene (1); 16:02 – Tyler Seguin (4); 16:45 – en – Esa Lindell (1)
Stuart Skinner 22 saves / 27 shots		Goalie stats	Jake Oettinger 24 saves / 27 shots

May 23	Edmonton Oilers	3–0	Dallas Stars	American Airlines Center	Recap
Ryan Nugent-Hopkins (5) – pp – 05:51		First period	No scoring
Brett Kulak (1) – 15:23; Connor Brown (5) – 16:36		Second period	No scoring
No scoring		Third period	No scoring
Stuart Skinner 25 saves / 25 shots		Goalie stats	Jake Oettinger 22 saves / 25 shots

May 25	Dallas Stars	1–6	Edmonton Oilers	Rogers Place	Recap
No scoring		First period	14:02 – Evan Bouchard (6); 14:38 – Connor McDavid (4)
Jason Robertson (1) – 15:35		Second period	19:41 – Connor McDavid (5)
No scoring		Third period	03:25 – Zach Hyman (4); 12:06 – Zach Hyman (5); 17:40 – pp – John Klingberg (1)
Jake Oettinger 18 saves / 24 shots		Goalie stats	Stuart Skinner 33 saves / 34 shots

May 27	Dallas Stars	1–4	Edmonton Oilers	Rogers Place	Recap
No scoring		First period	11:23 – pp – Leon Draisaitl (7)
Jason Robertson (2) – pp – 06:57		Second period	09:20 – pp – Corey Perry (6)
No scoring		Third period	17:33 – en – Kasperi Kapanen (2); 19:10 – en – Adam Henrique (4)
Jake Oettinger 29 saves / 31 shots		Goalie stats	Stuart Skinner 28 saves / 29 shots

May 29	Edmonton Oilers	6–3	Dallas Stars	American Airlines Center	Recap
Corey Perry (7) – pp – 02:31; Mattias Janmark (3) – 07:09; Jeff Skinner (1) – 08:07		First period	11:40 – Jason Robertson (3)
Connor McDavid (6) – 14:28		Second period	12:27 – pp – Roope Hintz (6)
Evander Kane (5) – 03:21; Kasperi Kapanen (3) – en – 19:49		Third period	00:38 – Jason Robertson (4)
Stuart Skinner 14 saves / 17 shots		Goalie stats	Jake Oettinger 0 saves / 2 shots Casey DeSmith 17 saves / 20 shots

Edmonton won series 4–1

== Stanley Cup Final ==
This was the second consecutive and second overall playoff meeting between these teams. Florida won the previous season's Finals in seven games after leading the series 3–0. This was the second consecutive and ninth overall Finals appearance for the Oilers. Florida made their third consecutive and fourth overall Finals appearance. Florida won both games in this year's regular season series.

June 4	Florida Panthers	3–4	OT	Edmonton Oilers	Rogers Place	Recap
Sam Bennett (11) – 10:49; Brad Marchand (5) – pp – 12:30		First period		01:06 – Leon Draisaitl (8)
Sam Bennett (12) – 02:00		Second period		03:17 – Viktor Arvidsson (2)
No scoring		Third period		06:33 – Mattias Ekholm (1)
No scoring		First overtime period		19:29 – pp – Leon Draisaitl (9)
Sergei Bobrovsky 42 saves / 46 shots		Goalie stats		Stuart Skinner 29 saves / 32 shots

June 6	Florida Panthers	5–4	2OT	Edmonton Oilers	Rogers Place	Recap
Sam Bennett (13) – pp – 02:07; Seth Jones (4) – 11:37		First period		07:39 – Evander Kane (6); 09:19 – Evan Bouchard (7); 12:37 – pp – Leon Draisaitl (10)
Dmitry Kulikov (2) – 08:23; Brad Marchand (6) – sh – 12:09		Second period		No scoring
No scoring		Third period		19:42 – Corey Perry (8)
Brad Marchand (7) – 08:05		Second overtime period		No scoring
Sergei Bobrovsky 42 saves / 46 shots		Goalie stats		Stuart Skinner 37 saves / 42 shots

June 9	Edmonton Oilers	1–6	Florida Panthers	Amerant Bank Arena	Recap
No scoring		First period	00:56 – Brad Marchand (8); 17:45 – pp – Carter Verhaeghe (7)
Corey Perry (9) – pp – 01:40		Second period	03:00 – Sam Reinhart (5); 07:26 – Sam Bennett (14)
No scoring		Third period	03:27 – pp – Aaron Ekblad (4); 16:10 – pp – Evan Rodrigues (2)
Stuart Skinner 18 saves / 23 shots Calvin Pickard 7 saves / 8 shots		Goalie stats	Sergei Bobrovsky 32 saves / 33 shots

June 12	Edmonton Oilers	5–4	OT	Florida Panthers	Amerant Bank Arena	Recap
No scoring		First period		11:40 – pp – Matthew Tkachuk (6); 16:56 – pp – Matthew Tkachuk (7); 19:18 – Anton Lundell (6)
Ryan Nugent-Hopkins (6) – pp – 03:33; Darnell Nurse (3) – 12:47; Vasily Podkolzin (2) – 15:05		Second period		No scoring
Jake Walman (2) – 13:36		Third period		19:40 – Sam Reinhart (6)
Leon Draisaitl (11) – 11:18		First overtime period		No scoring
Stuart Skinner 14 saves / 17 shots Calvin Pickard 22 saves / 23 shots		Goalie stats		Sergei Bobrovsky 30 saves / 35 shots

June 14	Florida Panthers	5–2	Edmonton Oilers	Rogers Place	Recap
Brad Marchand (9) – 09:12; Sam Bennett (15) – 18:06		First period	No scoring
No scoring		Second period	No scoring
Brad Marchand (10) – 05:12; Sam Reinhart (7) – 08:10; Eetu Luostarinen (5) – en – 18:41		Third period	07:24 – Connor McDavid (7); 16:47 – Corey Perry (10)
Sergei Bobrovsky 19 saves / 21 shots		Goalie stats	Calvin Pickard 14 saves / 18 shots

June 17	Edmonton Oilers	1–5	Florida Panthers	Amerant Bank Arena	Recap
No scoring		First period	04:36 – Sam Reinhart (8); 19:13 – Matthew Tkachuk (8)
No scoring		Second period	17:31 – Sam Reinhart (9)
Vasily Podkolzin (3) – 15:18		Third period	13:26 – en – Sam Reinhart (10); 14:55 – en – Sam Reinhart (11)
Stuart Skinner 20 saves / 23 shots		Goalie stats	Sergei Bobrovsky 28 saves / 29 shots

Florida won series 4–2

== Player statistics ==
=== Skaters ===
These are the top ten skaters based on points, following the conclusion of the playoffs.

Player	Team	GP	G	A	Pts	+/–	PIM
Leon Draisaitl	Edmonton Oilers	22	11	22	33	+4	6
Connor McDavid	Edmonton Oilers	22	7	26	33	+3	4
Sam Reinhart	Florida Panthers	21	11	12	23	+5	6
Matthew Tkachuk	Florida Panthers	23	8	15	23	+7	33
Evan Bouchard	Edmonton Oilers	22	7	16	23	+6	8
Carter Verhaeghe	Florida Panthers	23	7	16	23	+12	6
Sam Bennett	Florida Panthers	23	15	7	22	+6	48
Mikko Rantanen	Dallas Stars	18	9	13	22	−3	10
Aleksander Barkov	Florida Panthers	23	6	16	22	+4	4
Brad Marchand	Florida Panthers	23	10	10	20	+17	48

=== Goaltenders ===
This is a combined table of the top five goaltenders based on goals against average and the top five goaltenders based on save percentage, with at least 420 minutes played, following the conclusion of the playoffs. The table is sorted by GAA, and the criteria for inclusion are bolded.

Player	Team	GP	W	L	SA	GA	GAA	SV%	SO	TOI
Frederik Andersen	Carolina Hurricanes	13	8	5	269	25	**2.02**	**.907**	2	743:04
Sergei Bobrovsky	Florida Panthers	23	16	7	618	53	**2.20**	**.914**	3	1,442:34
Logan Thompson	Washington Capitals	10	5	5	289	24	**2.41**	**.917**	0	596:30
Jordan Binnington	St. Louis Blues	7	3	4	192	19	**2.53**	**.901**	0	450:30
Mackenzie Blackwood	Colorado Avalanche	7	3	4	176	19	**2.71**	.892	1	420:45
Jake Oettinger	Dallas Stars	18	9	8	503	48	2.82	**.905**	0	1,021:21

== Media ==
=== Canada ===
In Canada, this marked the eleventh postseason under Rogers Sports & Media's 12-year contract. Games aired across Sportsnet, SN1, SN360, and CBC under the Hockey Night in Canada brand. For first and second-round U.S.–U.S. games not on CBC, Sportsnet generally simulcast the U.S. feed instead of producing their own telecast. The 2025 Stanley Cup Final were simulcast on both CBC and Sportsnet.

Every game was available to stream on Sportsnet+.

=== United States ===
In the U.S., this marked the fourth year of a seven-year agreement with the ESPN and TNT Sports.

For games in the first two rounds, games were split between ESPN-produced telecasts (either on ESPN, ABC, or ESPN2) and TNT Sports-produced telecasts (either on TNT or TBS, with selected simulcasts on TruTV). Each U.S. team's regional broadcaster also televised local coverage of first-round games, except for any games on ABC.

ESPN/ABC had the first choice of which conference final series to air, choosing the Western Conference finals this season. As a result, TNT Sports broadcast the Eastern Conference finals. As per the alternating rotation, TNT Sports has coverage of the 2025 Stanley Cup Final.

Max streamed all TNT Sports-produced telecasts. ESPN+ streams ABC games and ESPN's Conference Finals games.

During game one of the St. Louis–Winnipeg first round series, TNT was criticized for not sending announcers John Forslund and Jennifer Botterill to Winnipeg for the game, instead calling it remotely in the network's Atlanta studios. This was despite the fact ESPN decided to send the announce team of John Buccigross and Kevin Weekes to call games in Canada, encompassing game two of the St. Louis–Winnipeg series and the first three games of the Ottawa–Toronto series. Nevertheless, ESPN still received criticism for its audio mix of game one of Ottawa–Toronto even with Buccigross and Weekes on site. The Athletic later reported that TNT was producing remote broadcasts of first round games in Edmonton, Ottawa, and Winnipeg (except for any elimination games 5–7) due to financial reasons because "outside of Toronto and Montreal" travel in Canada "presents logistical challenges".

This was the fourth and final year under Sports USA Radio Network's deal to syndicate select Stanley Cup playoff games via NHL Radio across the U.S., including the entire conference finals and Stanley Cup Final.

Preceded by 2024 Stanley Cup playoffs	Stanley Cup playoffs 2025	Succeeded by 2026 Stanley Cup playoffs
