= Mackenzie Blackwood =

Canadian ice hockey player (born 1996)

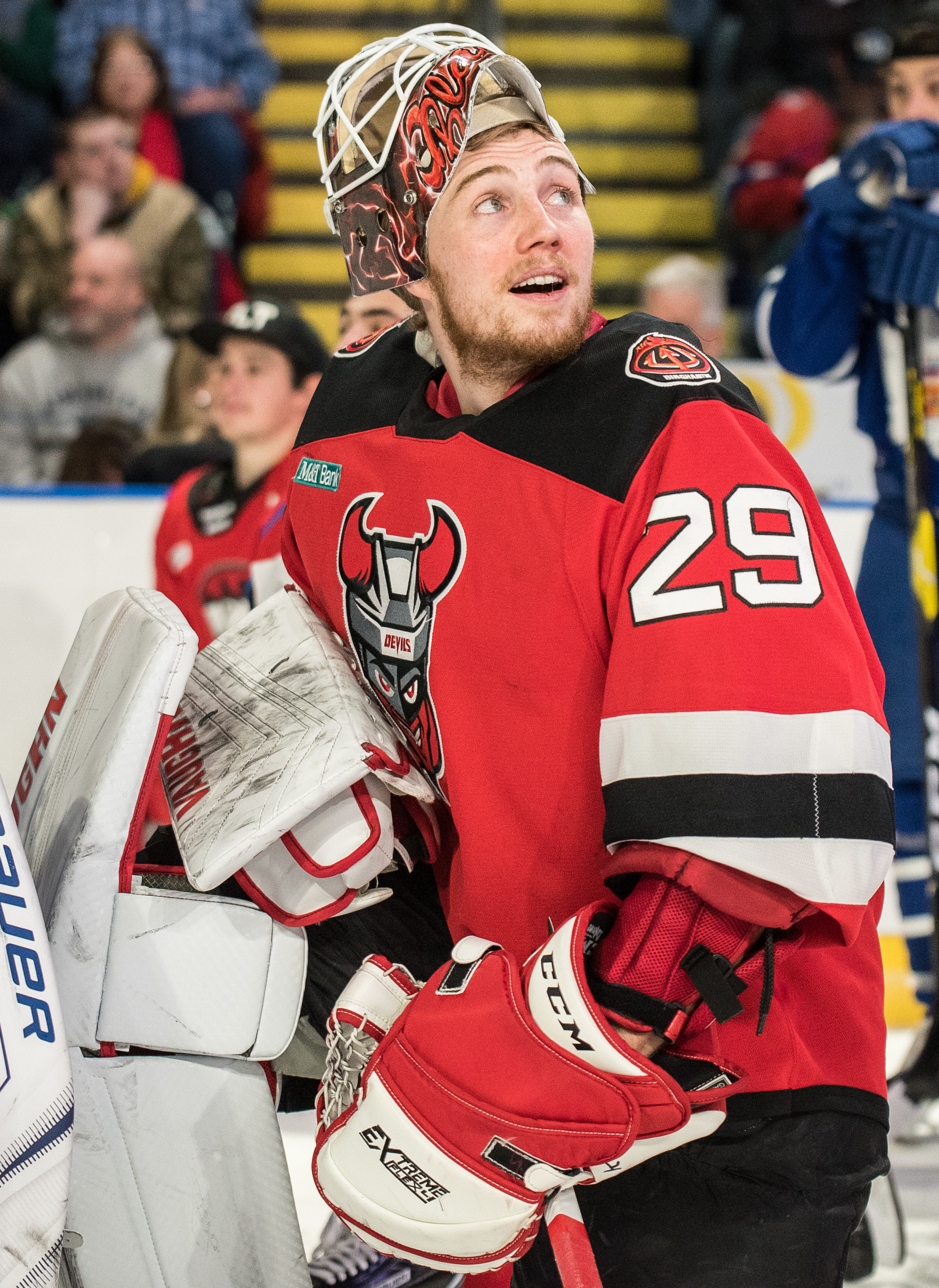
- Blackwood with the Binghamton Devils in 2019
- Born: December 9, 1996 (age 29) Thunder Bay, Ontario, Canada
- Height: 6 ft 4 in (193 cm)
- Weight: 225 lb (102 kg; 16 st 1 lb)
- Position: Goaltender
- Catches: Left
- NHL team Former teams: Colorado Avalanche; New Jersey Devils; San Jose Sharks
- National team: Canada
- NHL draft: 42nd overall, 2015; New Jersey Devils
- Playing career: 2016–present

Mackenzie Blackwood (born December 9, 1996) is a Canadian professional ice hockey player who is a goaltender for the Colorado Avalanche of the National Hockey League (NHL). Blackwood was the top-rated North American goaltender ranked in the NHL Central Scouting Bureau's final rankings for the 2015 NHL entry draft. He was selected by the New Jersey Devils in the second round, 42nd overall, in the 2015 NHL entry draft.

== Early life ==
Blackwood was born on December 9, 1996, in Thunder Bay, Ontario. His father was involved in local ice hockey teams, while his mother played basketball and track and field. He began playing ice hockey at the age of nine, comparatively late by Canadian standards, and temporarily quit after only a year. When he was 12 years old, the goaltender for Blackwood's youth hockey team was injured, and Blackwood volunteered to mind the net in his place. He enjoyed the new position and became a full-time goaltender. He played in house leagues with the Volunteer Pool Bearcats and Neebing Hawks before joining the Thunder Bay Kings of the Thunder Bay AAA Hockey League for the 2011–12 minor ice hockey season. There, he won 15 games while posting a 3.08 goals against average (GAA). The following season, he was recruited for the Elmira Sugar Kings of the Greater Ontario Junior Hockey League; the son of Elmira director of hockey operations Keith Stewart was a scout for the Barrie Colts of the Ontario Hockey League (OHL) and wanted Blackwood to gain a year of development in a lower-tier junior ice hockey league before he was drafted by a Junior A-level team.

== Playing career ==
=== Junior ===
Following his performance in minor hockey, the Colts selected Blackwood in the fifth round of the 2012 OHL Priority Selection. Originally a backup during his rookie 2013–14 season, Blackwood became the Colts' starting goaltender early in the season when Mathias Niederberger left the team and Alex Fotinos struggled in the role. He earned his first shutout on November 1, stopping all 31 shots from the Niagara IceDogs. After leading all rookies in both the OHL and the Canadian Hockey League (CHL) with a 2.98 GAA and .902 save percentage (SV%) and leading OHL rookies with 23 wins, Blackwood was named to the OHL First All-Rookie Team in 2014. Although the Colts' OHL postseason run came to an end with a loss to the North Bay Battalion in the second playoff round, Blackwood was praised by coaches for his performance during the season, and he was expected to remain Barrie's starting goaltender for the remainder of his junior hockey career.

The following season, Blackwood was selected to the OHL All-Stars for the 2014 Subway Super Series. He was also chosen to play the 2015 CHL/NHL Top Prospects Game, but was unavailable due to illness.

=== Professional ===
==== New Jersey Devils ====
On December 30, 2015, Blackwood signed a three-year, entry-level contract with the New Jersey Devils, who had drafted him in the 2015 NHL entry draft. After playing for the Devils' American Hockey League (AHL) affiliate, Blackwood was assigned to the Adirondack Thunder, the Devils' ECHL affiliate, on January 1, 2018.

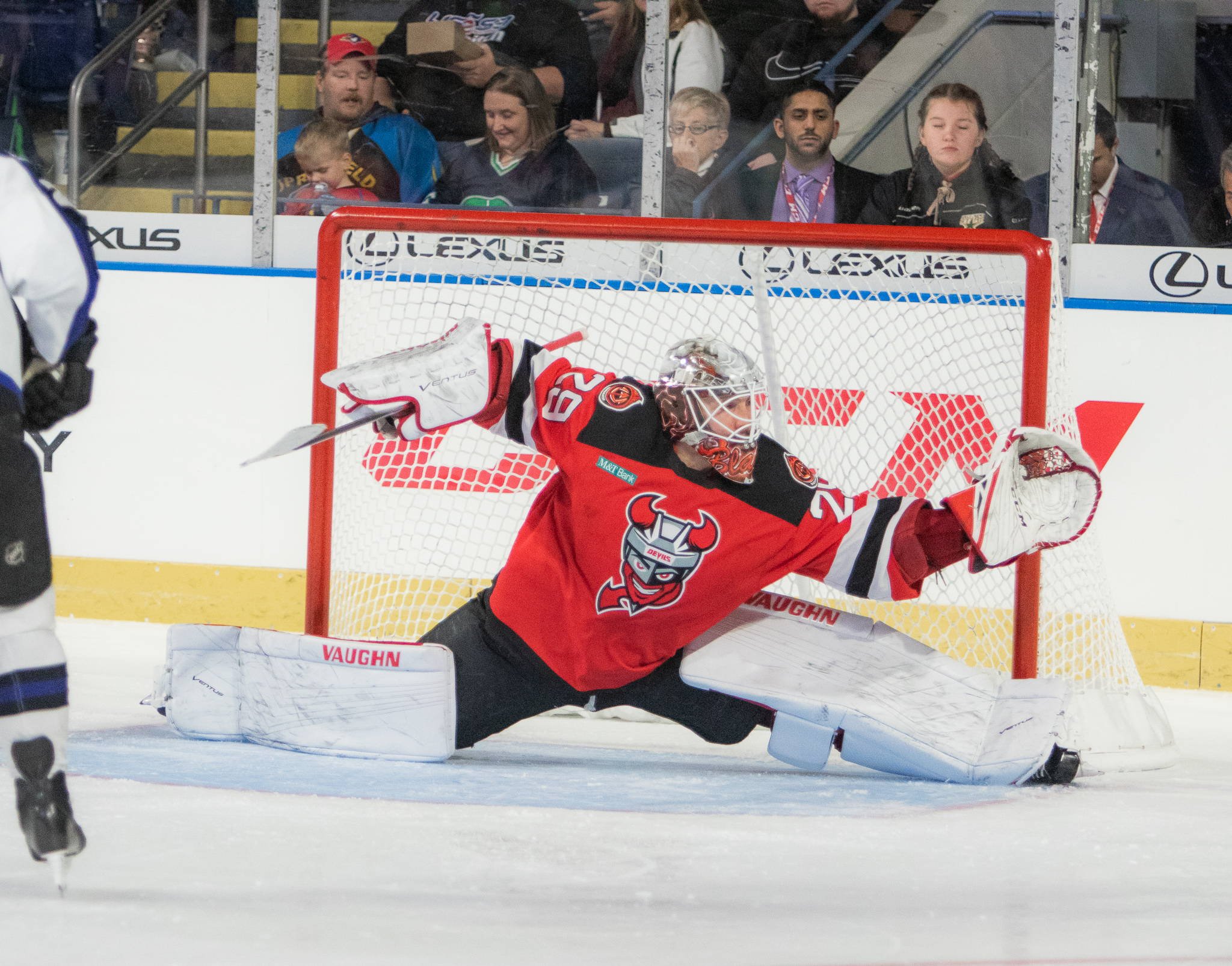
Blackwood in 2019

Blackwood began the 2018–19 season with the Devils' AHL affiliate, the Binghamton Devils. He was recalled to New Jersey on December 17 after goaltender Cory Schneider was placed on injured reserve. Blackwood made his NHL debut the following night in a 7–2 loss to the Toronto Maple Leafs. He replaced starter Keith Kinkaid in the third period and saved eight of 10 shots. On December 20, Blackwood made his first NHL start against the Columbus Blue Jackets, and although the Devils lost 2–1, Blackwood had an impressive performance, saving 36 of 38 shots. On December 27, Blackwood recorded his first NHL win, a 5–2 victory over the Boston Bruins, with another strong performance, making 40 saves on 42 shots. In his third NHL start, Blackwood recorded 37 saves to earn his first shutout in a 2–0 victory over the Carolina Hurricanes on December 29. Blackwood was named a Star of the Week following this performance. Following another shutout victory on December 31 against the Vancouver Canucks, Blackwood became the first Devils rookie goaltender to post back-to-back shutouts. He also became the youngest Devils goaltender to record multiple regular season shutouts, surpassing Martin Brodeur. On January 3, 2019, Blackwood was named to the North Division roster for the 2019 AHL All-Star Classic. On January 10, Blackwood was placed on injured reserve by the Devils due to a lower-body injury he suffered on January 2. He returned to the Devils and played his first game since January 4 in a 3–2 win over the Philadelphia Flyers on January 12.

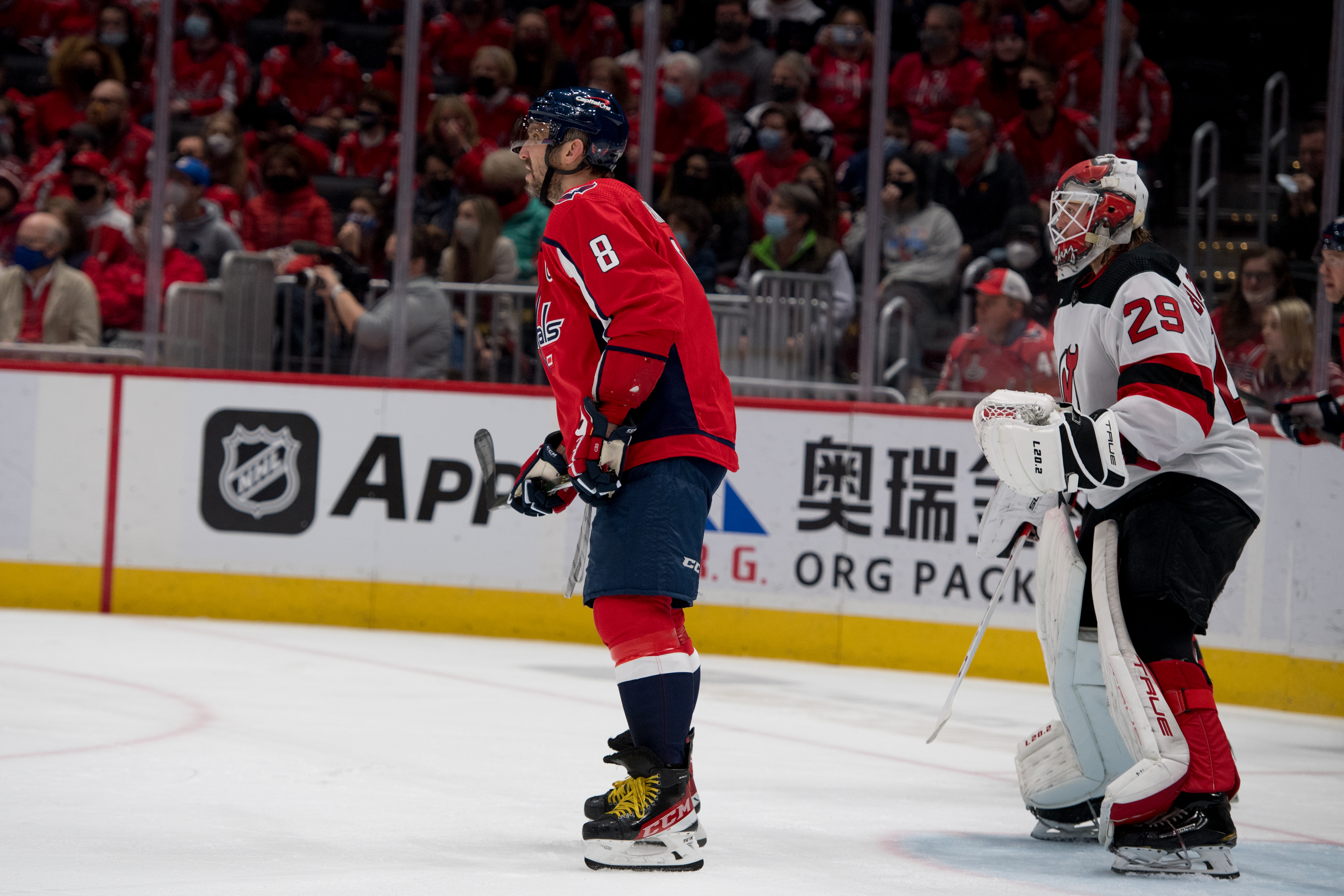
Blackwood screened by Alexander Ovechkin during a game in January 2022

On December 23, 2020, the Devils re-signed Blackwood to a three-year contract.

==== San Jose Sharks ====
As a pending restricted free agent with the Devils, Blackwood was traded to the San Jose Sharks for a 2023 sixth-round pick on June 27, 2023. On July 1, he signed a two-year deal with the Sharks. His debut for the Sharks came in the early stages of the 2023–24 season on October 14, in a 2–1 shootout loss to the Colorado Avalanche, in which he made 51 saves.

==== Colorado Avalanche, Jennings Trophy ====
On December 9, 2024, Blackwood was traded by the Sharks to the Colorado Avalanche, along with Givani Smith and a fifth-round pick in the 2027 NHL entry draft, for Alexandar Georgiev, Nikolai Kovalenko, a 2025 conditional fifth-round pick, and a second-round pick in the 2026 NHL entry draft. Blackwood made his debut with the Avalanche on December 14, registering 37 saves in a 5–2 victory over the Nashville Predators.

After four outings with Colorado, Blackwood agreed to a five-year, $26.25 million contract extension to remain with the Avalanche through 2030 on December 27, 2024. With the Avalanche completely revamping the goaltender position during the season, with former Devils teammate Scott Wedgewood having earlier been acquired to serve as backup, Blackwood helped stabilize the net and was a central reason for improved defensive play in the backend. He recorded his first shutout for the Avalanche in a 5–0 victory over the St. Louis Blues on January 31, 2025. Among the top statistical goaltenders from the time he joined the Avalanche, Blackwood completed the regular season making 37 regular-season appearances with Colorado. In those appearances, he started 36 times and notched 22 wins along with a .913 save percentage, a 2.33 goals-against average, and 3 shutouts. Blackwood joined Darcy Kuemper as the only goaltenders in franchise history to post at least 22 wins and three shutouts in their first 37 appearances with the team.

Making his NHL post-season debut on April 20, 2025, Blackwood posted a victory in Game 1 against divisional rivals the Dallas Stars. He posted his first career playoff shutout, making 23 saves, in a Game 4 4–0 victory on April 27, 2025. Blackwood notched 3 wins and posted a 2.71 goal against average in the series before the Avalanche lost the series.

Blackwood started the 2025–26 season out of the lineup, rehabbing from an off-season surgery to fix a lower-body injury. He made his first start of the season against his former team, the Sharks, on November 1, losing in overtime. He earned his first win of the season, a 5–4 overtime decision, eight days later against the Vancouver Canucks. At the conclusion of the regular season, Blackwood and teammate Scott Wedgewood won the William M. Jennings Trophy after giving up the fewest goals against, at 197. The last member of the Avalanche to win the trophy was Patrick Roy in the 2001–02 NHL season. Blackwood finished the season eighth in goals against average and 20th in save percentage.

== International play ==
Medal record

Ice hockey

Representing Canada

World Championships
Silver medal – second place	2019 Slovakia	

On June 24, 2015, Blackwood was one of only three goaltenders invited to attend Hockey Canada's U-20 summer development camp. He was one of three goaltenders who represented the Canadian junior team at the 2016 World Junior Ice Hockey Championships.

On April 29, 2019, Blackwood was named as the third-choice goaltender to the senior Canadian roster for the 2019 IIHF World Championship held in Slovakia. He made his debut for Canada in a relief appearance, replacing Carter Hart for nine minutes in a 5–0 round robin victory over Denmark on May 20. He earned a silver medal as Canada progressed through to the playoff rounds before losing the final to Finland on May 26.

== Personal life ==
Blackwood was raised in Thunder Bay. His mother, Rhonda Crocker-Ellacott, is the president and CEO of the Thunder Bay Regional Health Sciences Centre. His father was a fan of the Colorado Avalanche and encouraged his son to cheer for them.

== Career statistics ==
=== Regular season and playoffs ===
			Regular season									Playoffs
Season	Team	League	GP	W	L	T/OT	MIN	GA	SO	GAA	SV%	GP	W	L	MIN	GA	SO	GAA	SV%
2011–12	Thunder Bay Kings Mn Midget AAA	TBJBHL	38	15	13	2	—	121	1	3.08	—	—	—	—	—	—	—	—	—
2012–13	Elmira Sugar Kings	GOJHL	24	10	8	2	—	74	0	3.39	.911	—	—	—	—	—	—	—	—
2013–14	Barrie Colts	OHL	45	23	15	2	2,497	124	0	2.98	.931	10	5	4	552	24	1	2.61	.904
2014–15	Barrie Colts	OHL	51	33	14	2	2,953	152	0	3.09	.931	9	5	4	562	27	0	2.88	.922
2015–16	Barrie Colts	OHL	43	28	13	0	2,452	111	2	2.72	.914	13	6	5	796	36	1	2.71	.915
2016–17	Albany Devils	AHL	36	17	14	3	2,048	87	3	2.55	.907	4	1	3	254	9	1	2.13	.928
2017–18	Binghamton Devils	AHL	32	7	17	6	1,810	103	2	3.41	.882	—	—	—	—	—	—	—	—
2017–18	Adirondack Thunder	ECHL	5	2	1	1	242	10	0	2.48	.920	5	3	1	240	4	1	1.00	.964
2018–19	Binghamton Devils	AHL	20	8	10	1	1,139	56	1	2.95	.902	—	—	—	—	—	—	—	—
2018–19	New Jersey Devils	NHL	23	10	10	0	1,264	55	2	2.61	.918	—	—	—	—	—	—	—	—
2019–20	New Jersey Devils	NHL	47	22	14	8	2,685	124	3	2.77	.915	—	—	—	—	—	—	—	—
2020–21	New Jersey Devils	NHL	35	14	17	4	2,091	106	1	3.04	.902	—	—	—	—	—	—	—	—
2021–22	New Jersey Devils	NHL	25	9	10	4	1,400	79	2	3.39	.892	—	—	—	—	—	—	—	—
2022–23	New Jersey Devils	NHL	22	10	6	2	1,126	60	0	3.20	.893	—	—	—	—	—	—	—	—
2022–23	Utica Comets	AHL	2	1	1	0	119	6	0	3.03	.891	—	—	—	—	—	—	—	—
2023–24	San Jose Sharks	NHL	44	10	25	4	2,437	140	2	3.45	.899	—	—	—	—	—	—	—	—
2024–25	San Jose Sharks	NHL	19	6	9	3	1,059	53	1	3.00	.911	—	—	—	—	—	—	—	—
2024–25	Colorado Avalanche	NHL	37	22	12	3	2,165	84	3	2.33	.913	7	3	4	421	19	1	2.71	.892
2025–26	Colorado Avalanche	NHL	39	23	10	2	2,156	90	3	2.51	.904	4	1	1	170	8	0	2.82	.890
NHL totals			291	126	113	30	16,380	791	17	2.90	.906	11	4	5	591	27	1	2.74	.892

=== International ===
Year	Team	Event	Result	GP	W	L	OT	MIN	GA	SO	GAA	SV%
2016	Canada	WJC	6th	3	0	2	0	183	12	0	3.95	.858
2019	Canada	WC	2nd place, silver medalist(s)	1	0	0	0	9	0	0	0.00	1.000
Junior totals				3	0	2	0	183	12	0	3.95	.858
Senior totals				1	0	0	0	9	0	0	0.00	1.000

== Awards and honours ==
Award	Year
OHL
First All-Rookie Team	2013–14
Subway Super Series OHL All-Stars	2014–15
First Team All-Star	2015–16
Goaltender of the Year	2015–16
NHL
William M. Jennings Trophy	2026
