= Joseph Woll =

American ice hockey player (born 1998)

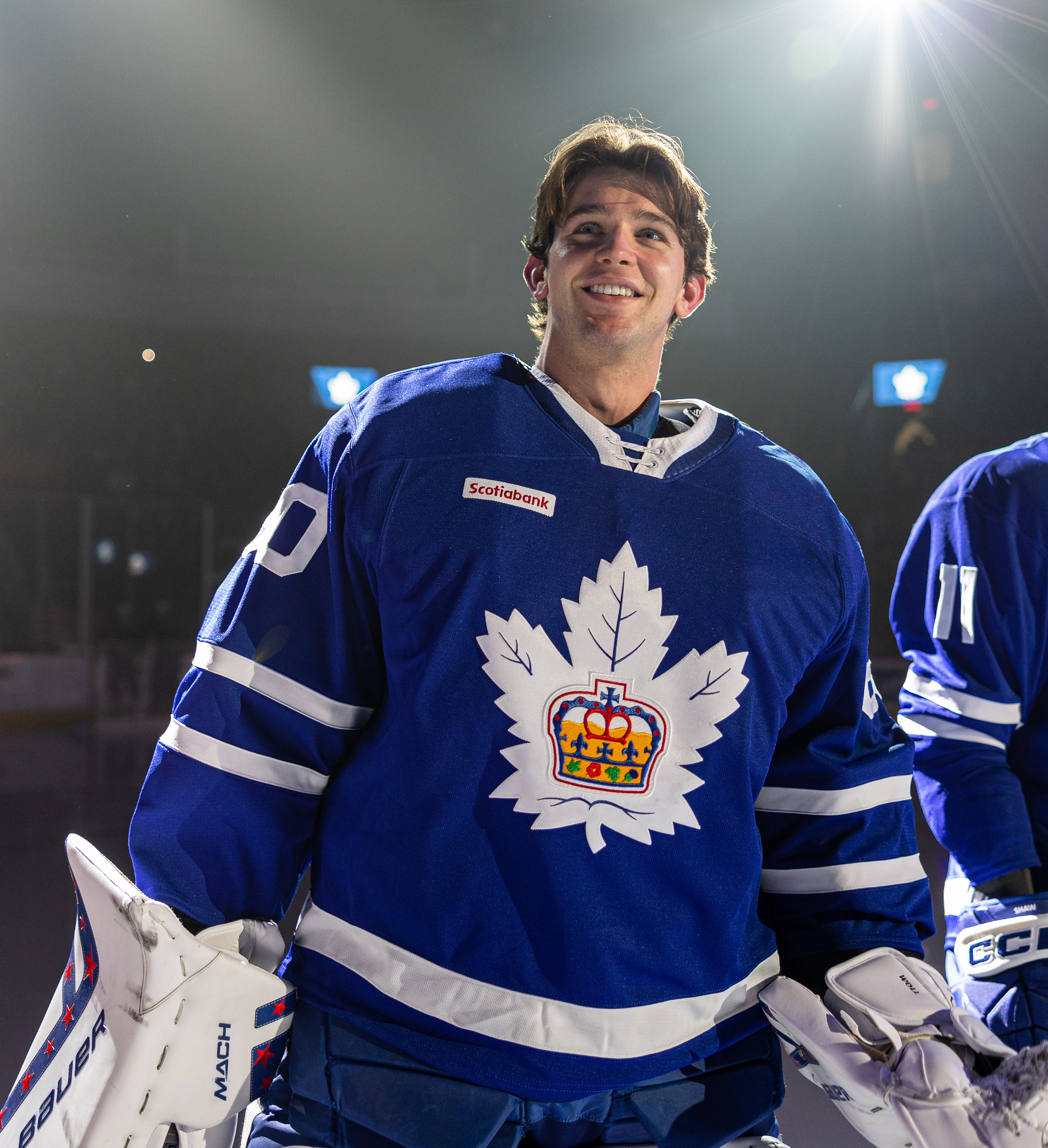
- Woll with the Toronto Marlies in 2023
- Born: July 12, 1998 (age 28) Dardenne Prairie, Missouri, U.S.
- Height: 6 ft 3 in (191 cm)
- Weight: 212 lb (96 kg; 15 st 2 lb)
- Position: Goaltender
- Catches: Left
- NHL team Former teams: Philadelphia Flyers; Toronto Maple Leafs
- National team: United States
- NHL draft: 62nd overall, 2016; Toronto Maple Leafs
- Playing career: 2019–present

Joseph Woll (born July 12, 1998) is an American professional ice hockey player who is a goaltender for the Philadelphia Flyers of the National Hockey League (NHL). Woll was selected by the Toronto Maple Leafs in the third round, 62nd overall, of the 2016 NHL entry draft.

== Playing career ==
=== Amateur ===
Woll played three years of college hockey with Boston College. Woll modeled his style of play on Carey Price. He assumed the team's starting role in the net after Thatcher Demko graduated. He played in the 2017 World Junior Championships for Team USA. He appeared in two games, posting a 1.50 goals against average (GAA) and .932 save percentage and won a gold medal with the team. He played in the 2018 World Junior Championships with Team USA. He started five games on the way to winning the bronze medal that year.

=== Professional ===
==== Toronto Maple Leafs ====
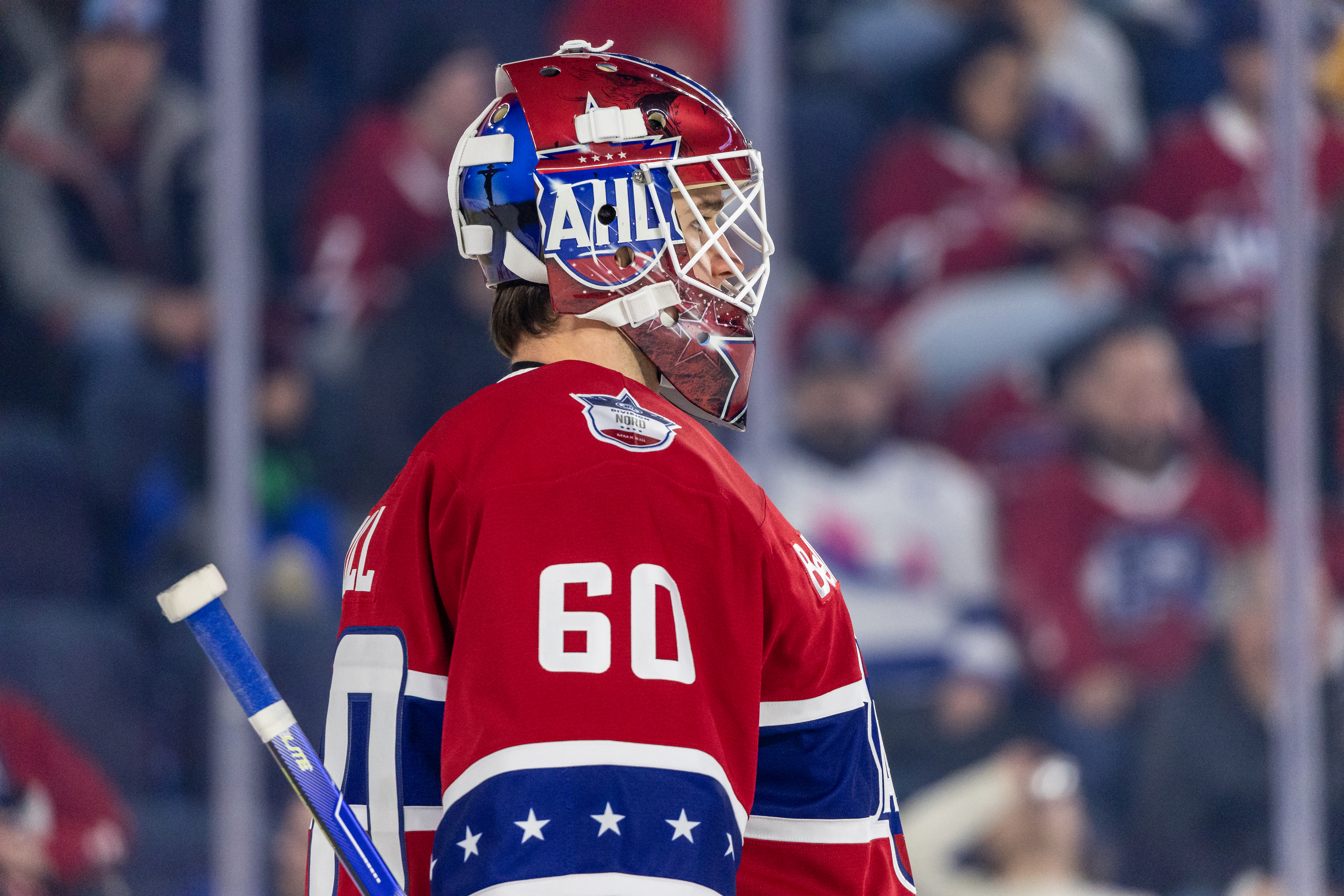
Woll during the 2023 AHL All-Star Classic Game.

Woll was selected by the Toronto Maple Leafs in the third round (62nd overall) of the 2016 NHL entry draft. He signed a three-year entry-level contract with the Maple Leafs on March 24, 2019. In July 2021, he signed a one-year contract extension with the Maple Leafs.

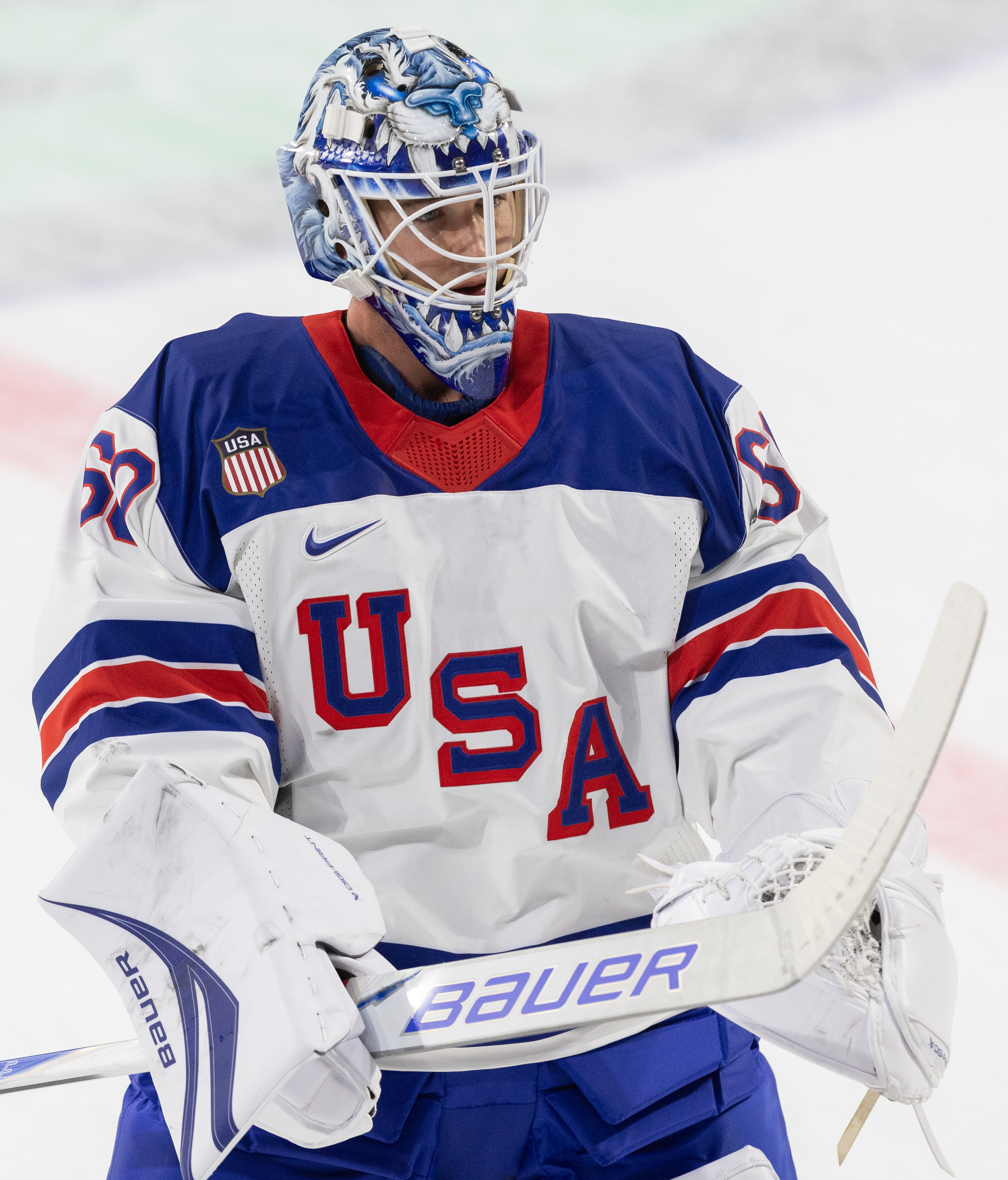
Woll with Team USA in 2026

He was recalled by the Maple Leafs on November 6, 2021, after Petr Mrázek suffered an injury. Woll made his NHL debut on November 13, 2021, against the Buffalo Sabres and made 23 saves in a 5–4 win. He played in four games total with the Maple Leafs and went 3–1–0 with a 2.76 GAA and a .911 save percentage. On February 11, 2022, he signed a three-year extension with the Maple Leafs.

In May 2023, Woll made his NHL playoff debut coming in relief of starter Ilya Samsonov, playing the third period of Game 1. The Maple Leafs went on to lose the game to the Tampa Bay Lightning 7–3 with Woll giving up 1 goal on 5 shots. He assumed the starter's job in the second period of Game 3 during the Maple Leafs second-round series against the Florida Panthers when starter Ilya Samsonov got injured in a collision with teammate Luke Schenn. Woll would surrender 3 goals in the second and third as the Leafs lost the game to go down in the series 3 games to zero. Woll made his first career playoff start in Game 4 and got the victory giving up only 1 goal, making 24 saves. However, the Maple Leafs lost the series to Florida after Nick Cousins scored the overtime winner in Game 5 to eliminate them from the playoffs 4–1.

In the 2023–24 season Woll, for his first season, played regularly for the Maple Leafs, starting in 23 games and winning 12. In the playoffs that season, he started in games five and six against the Boston Bruins in the first round, winning both and only conceding two goals, but was injured at the end of game six.

In the 2025 Stanley Cup playoffs, Woll replaced Anthony Stolarz, who was injured, in the second round against the Florida Panthers. In game six, he recorded his first shutout in the playoffs, saving 22 shots.

==== Philadelphia Flyers ====
On June 16, 2026, Woll was traded to the Philadelphia Flyers, alongside Simon Benoit, in exchange for Emil Andrae, Samuel Ersson, and a 2026 third-round pick.

== Career statistics ==
=== Regular season and playoffs ===
			Regular season									Playoffs
Season	Team	League	GP	W	L	OTL	MIN	GA	SO	GAA	SV%	GP	W	L	MIN	GA	SO	GAA	SV%
2013–14	St. Louis AAA Blues	T1EHL	18	—	—	—	—	—	—	1.71	.933	—	—	—	—	—	—	—	—
2014–15	U.S. National Development Team	USHL	18	3	15	0	—	—	0	4.21	.878	—	—	—	—	—	—	—	—
2014–15	U.S. National U17 Team	USDP	29	—	—	—	—	—	—	3.48	.886	—	—	—	—	—	—	—	—
2015–16	U.S. National Development Team	USHL	12	6	4	1	—	—	0	2.60	.898	—	—	—	—	—	—	—	—
2015–16	U.S. National U18 Team	USDP	33	—	—	—	—	—	—	2.14	.918	—	—	—	—	—	—	—	—
2016–17	Boston College	HE	34	17	13	3	1,977	87	1	2.64	.913	—	—	—	—	—	—	—	—
2017–18	Boston College	HE	30	17	11	2	1,790	74	2	2.48	.915	—	—	—	—	—	—	—	—
2018–19	Boston College	HE	37	13	21	3	2,190	88	3	2.41	.919	—	—	—	—	—	—	—	—
2019–20	Toronto Marlies	AHL	32	11	16	4	1,745	109	2	3.75	.880	—	—	—	—	—	—	—	—
2020–21	Toronto Marlies	AHL	15	7	7	0	797	47	1	3.54	.892	—	—	—	—	—	—	—	—
2021–22	Toronto Marlies	AHL	15	6	7	0	767	43	0	3.36	.907	—	—	—	—	—	—	—	—
2021–22	Toronto Maple Leafs	NHL	4	3	1	0	240	11	1	2.75	.911	—	—	—	—	—	—	—	—
2022–23	Toronto Marlies	AHL	21	16	4	1	1239	49	0	2.37	.927	1	0	1	57	7	0	7.40	.800
2022–23	Toronto Maple Leafs	NHL	7	6	1	0	417	15	0	2.16	.932	4	1	2	198	8	0	2.43	.915
2023–24	Toronto Maple Leafs	NHL	25	12	11	1	1472	72	0	2.94	.907	3	2	0	140	2	0	0.86	.964
2023–24	Toronto Marlies	AHL	1	1	0	0	60	1	0	1.00	.973	—	—	—	—	—	—	—	—
2024–25	Toronto Maple Leafs	NHL	42	27	14	1	2442	111	1	2.73	.909	7	3	4	387	23	1	3.56	.886
2025–26	Toronto Maple Leafs	NHL	39	15	16	7	2230	124	2	3.34	.899	—	—	—	—	—	—	—	—
NHL totals			117	63	43	9	6,800	333	4	2.94	.906	14	6	6	725	33	1	2.73	.906

=== International ===
Year	Team	Event	Result	GP	W	L	OT	MIN	GA	SO	GAA	SV%
2014	United States	U17	2nd place, silver medalist(s)	3	3	0	0	180	7	0	2.33	.905
2016	United States	U18	3rd place, bronze medalist(s)	3	2	1	0	179	4	1	1.34	.947
2017	United States	WJC	1st place, gold medalist(s)	2	2	0	0	120	3	0	1.50	.935
2018	United States	WJC	3rd place, bronze medalist(s)	5	3	2	0	287	13	1	2.71	.886
2026	United States	WC	8th	3	1	2	0	142	11	0	4.65	.761
Junior totals				13	10	3	0	766	27	2	1.97	.918
Senior totals				3	1	2	0	142	11	0	4.65	.761
