= Emil Andrae =

Swedish ice hockey player (born 2002)

- Born: February 23, 2002 (age 24) Västervik, Sweden
- Height: 5 ft 9 in (175 cm)
- Weight: 189 lb (86 kg; 13 st 7 lb)
- Position: Defence
- Shoots: Left
- NHL team (P) Cur. team Former teams: Columbus Blue Jackets; Cleveland Monsters (AHL); HV71; Philadelphia Flyers
- NHL draft: 54th overall, 2020; Philadelphia Flyers
- Playing career: 2018–present

Emil Valentin Andrae (born February 23, 2002) is a Swedish professional ice hockey player who is a defenceman for the Cleveland Monsters of the American Hockey League (AHL) while under contract to the Columbus Blue Jackets of the National Hockey League (NHL). Andrae was drafted 54th overall by the Philadelphia Flyers in the 2020 NHL entry draft.

== Playing career ==
Born and raised in Västervik, Sweden, Andrae started to play for the local team Västerviks IK at a very young age. Ahead of the 2017–18 season, Andrae moved to Oskarshamn to play with IK Oskarshamn. Andrae stayed only one season in Oskarshamn before moving to Jönköping to play with HV71.

Andrae signed his first professional contract with HV71 on March 27, 2020.

Following the completion of the 2022–23 season with HV71, Andrae was initially signed to a professional tryout contract to join the Flyers' AHL affiliate, the Lehigh Valley Phantoms, for the remainder of the season. Shortly after making his North American debut with the Phantoms, on March 27, 2023, Andrae was signed to a three-year, entry-level contract with the Philadelphia Flyers to commence in the 2023–24 season.

Andrae played his first NHL game on October 14, 2023, against the Ottawa Senators. He played a total of four games for the Flyers in the 2023–24 season before being reassigned to the Phantoms, with whom he would complete his first season of professional hockey in North America.

In his second year under contract with the Flyers, Andrae saw more substantial playing time in the NHL, totaling 42 games for the team. He recorded his first career NHL point on October 29, 2024, an assist on Tyson Foerster's game-winning goal, against the Boston Bruins in a 2–0 shutout. He later scored his first NHL goal on November 25, 2024, in a 5–4 shootout loss against the Vegas Golden Knights.

On June 16, 2026, Andrae was traded to the Toronto Maple Leafs, alongside Samuel Ersson and a 2026 third-round pick, in exchange for Simon Benoit and Joseph Woll. He signed a two-year, $3.1 million contract with the Maple Leafs on July 4.

On September 28, 2026, Andrae was traded to the Columbus Blue Jackets from the Toronto Maple Leafs alongside forward Matthew Knies, center Steven Lorentz, and a conditional 2027 second-round draft pick in exchange for forward Kirill Marchenko, goaltender Elvis Merzlikins, and left wing Miles Wood. After recording two assists in five games, Andrae was sent down to the Cleveland Monsters, the Blue Jackets' AHL affiliate, on November 5.

== International play ==
Medal record

Representing Sweden

Ice hockey

World Junior Championships
Bronze medal – third place	2022 Canada	

Emil Andrae has represented Sweden twice at the IIHF World Junior Championships; first in 2021, then again in 2022.

He served as captain of the bronze medal-winning World Junior Swedish team in 2022. Andrae was named to the Media All-Star team and tied with Connor Bedard for ninth overall scoring in that year's tournament.

== Career statistics ==
=== Regular season and playoffs ===
			Regular season					Playoffs
Season	Team	League	GP	G	A	Pts	PIM	GP	G	A	Pts	PIM
2017–18	IK Oskarshamn	J20	1	0	0	0	0	2	0	0	0	0
2017–18	IK Oskarshamn	Allsv	4	0	0	0	2	—	—	—	—	—
2018–19	HV71	J20	23	2	5	7	22	3	0	0	0	2
2019–20	HV71	J20	40	11	27	38	82	—	—	—	—	—
2019–20	HV71	SHL	10	0	0	0	4	—	—	—	—	—
2020–21	HV71	SHL	31	0	7	7	6	—	—	—	—	—
2020–21	HV71	J20	1	0	1	1	0	—	—	—	—	—
2020–21	Västerviks IK	Allsv	15	3	3	6	4	—	—	—	—	—
2021–22	HV71	Allsv	41	9	24	33	18	10	3	8	11	10
2022–23	HV71	SHL	51	6	20	26	67	—	—	—	—	—
2022–23	Lehigh Valley Phantoms	AHL	10	2	4	6	6	3	0	0	0	4
2023–24	Philadelphia Flyers	NHL	4	0	0	0	0	—	—	—	—	—
2023–24	Lehigh Valley Phantoms	AHL	61	5	27	32	66	6	2	1	3	6
2024–25	Philadelphia Flyers	NHL	42	1	6	7	16	—	—	—	—	—
2024–25	Lehigh Valley Phantoms	AHL	25	3	13	16	21	7	0	6	6	6
2025–26	Philadelphia Flyers	NHL	61	2	11	13	22	4	0	1	1	4
2025–26	Lehigh Valley Phantoms	AHL	7	0	5	5	6	—	—	—	—	—
SHL totals			92	6	27	33	77	—	—	—	—	—
NHL totals			107	3	17	20	38	4	0	1	1	4

=== International ===
Year	Team	Event	Result	GP	G	A	Pts	PIM
2018	Sweden	U17	3rd place, bronze medalist(s)	6	0	3	3	6
2019	Sweden	HG18	3rd place, bronze medalist(s)	5	0	4	4	4
2021	Sweden	WJC	5th	5	0	1	1	2
2022	Sweden	WJC	3rd place, bronze medalist(s)	7	4	4	8	6
Junior totals				23	4	12	16	16
