= Simon Benoit =

Canadian ice hockey player (born 1998)

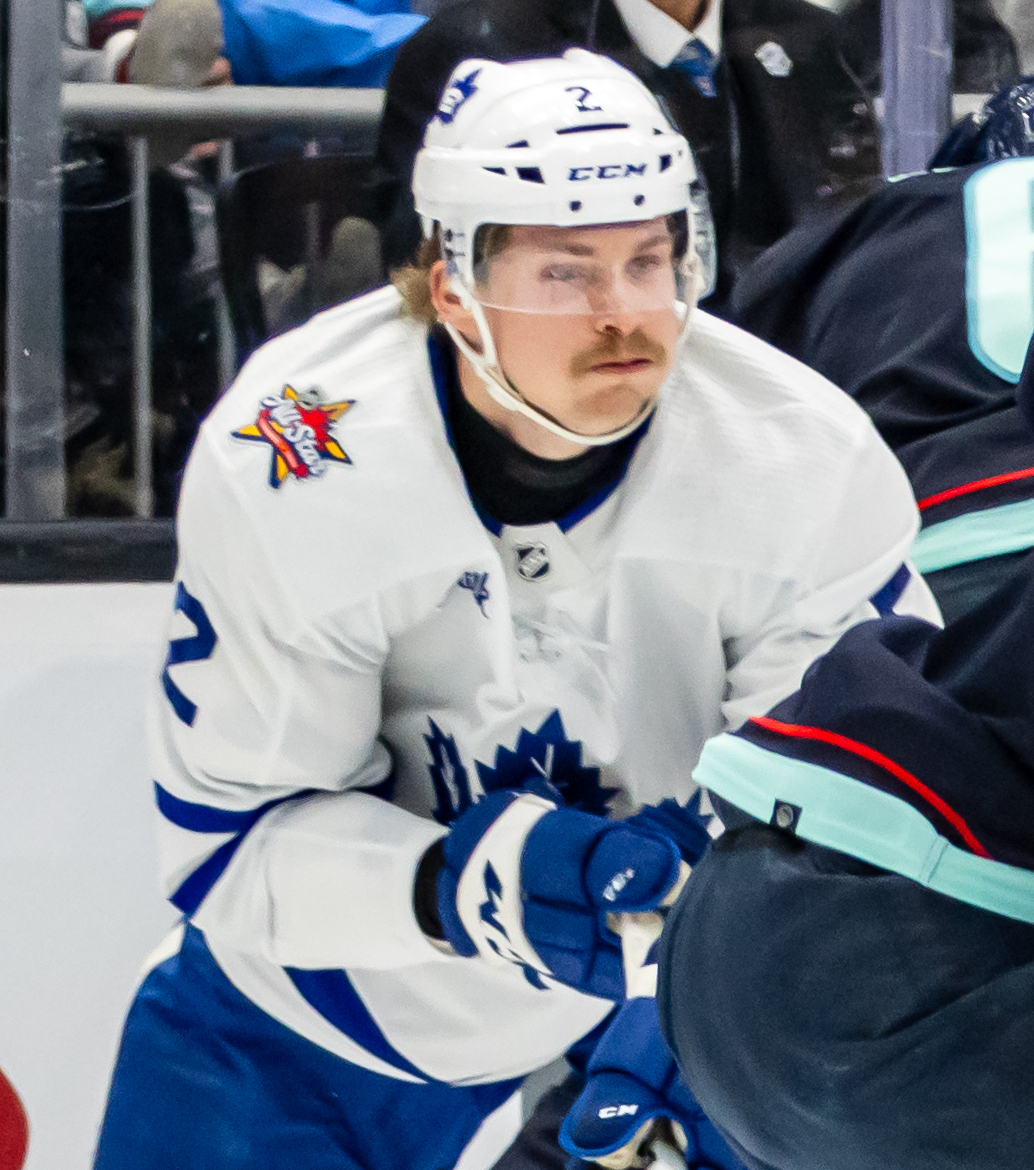
- Benoit with the Toronto Maple Leafs in 2024
- Born: September 19, 1998 (age 28) Laval, Quebec, Canada
- Height: 6 ft 3 in (191 cm)
- Weight: 190 lb (86 kg; 13 st 8 lb)
- Position: Defence
- Shoots: Left
- NHL team Former teams: Philadelphia Flyers; Anaheim Ducks; Toronto Maple Leafs
- NHL draft: Undrafted
- Playing career: 2018–present

Simon Benoit (born September 19, 1998) is a Canadian professional ice hockey player who is a defenceman for the Philadelphia Flyers of the National Hockey League (NHL).

== Playing career ==
Benoit played as a youth Ligue de hockey M18 AAA du Québec (LHMU18AAA) with Laval-Montréal Rousseau Royal before he was drafted by the Shawinigan Cataractes of the Quebec Major Junior Hockey League (QMJHL) in the eighth round, 129th overall, of the 2015 QMJHL Entry Draft.

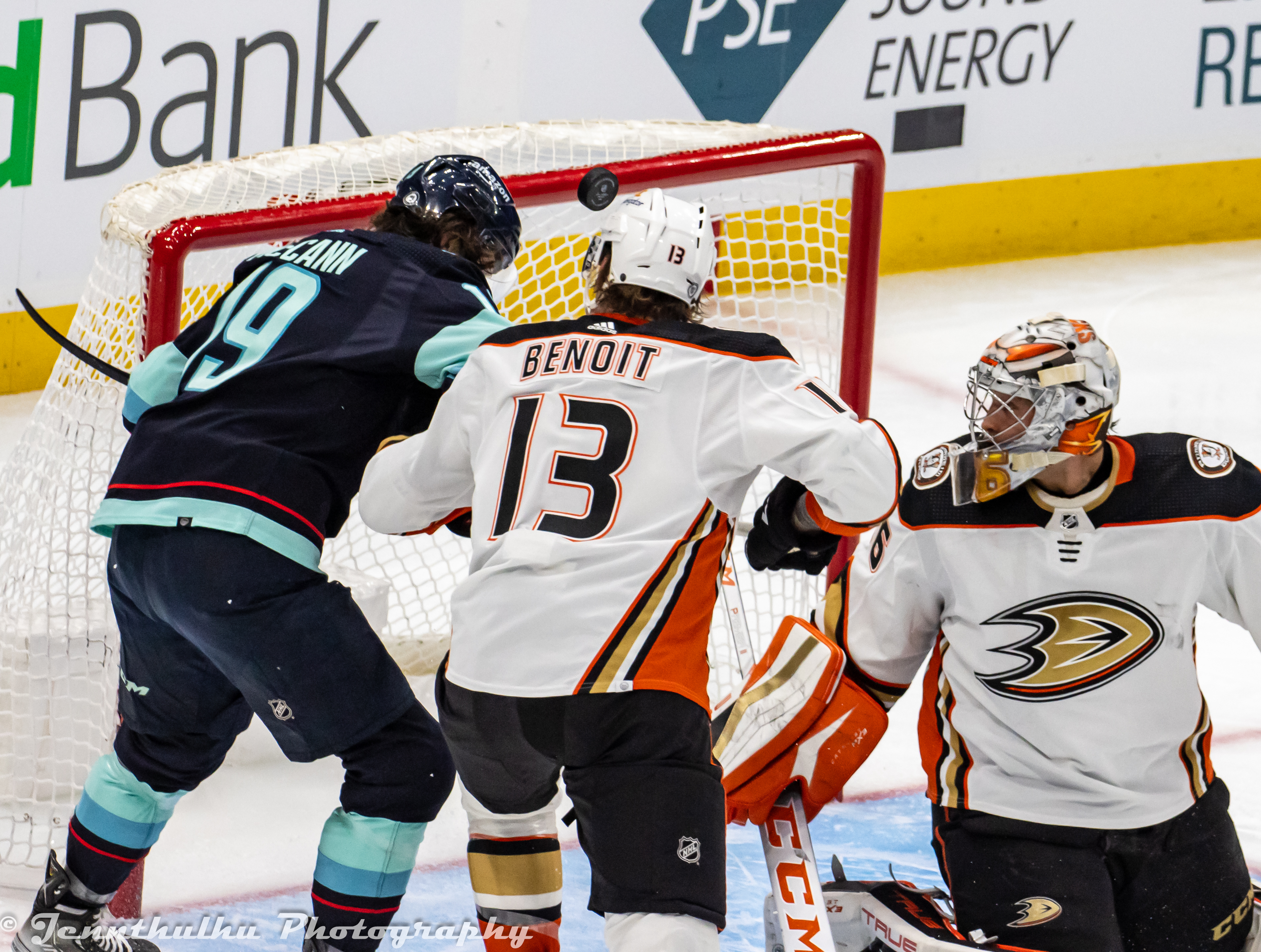
Benoit with the Anaheim Ducks in 2023

Benoit played three seasons in the QMJHL with the Cataractes before he was signed as an undrafted free agent to a one-year contract with the San Diego Gulls of the American Hockey League (AHL), the primary affiliate of the Anaheim Ducks on September 25, 2018. In his first professional year with the Gulls in the 2018–19 season, Benoit impressed by leading the Gulls in Plus/Minus with +16 and collecting 2 goals and 16 points through 65 regular season games. On March 8, 2019, he was signed by the Ducks to a three-year, entry-level contract beginning in the 2019–20 season.

During the 2020–21 season, while in his third year with the San Diego Gulls and adding dependable defensive play on the blueline, Benoit was recalled by the Ducks to make his NHL debut on April 29, 2021. While appearing on the Ducks third defensive pairing, Benoit went scoreless with 12 minutes time on ice in a 3–2 victory over the Los Angeles Kings. In the following 2021–22 season, on October 28, 2021, Benoit scored his first NHL goal in his eighth game with the Ducks, a game tying goal, against the Buffalo Sabres in a 4–3 OT loss. Benoit played his first full season with the Ducks during the 2021–22 season.

Having played five seasons within the Anaheim Ducks organization, as a pending restricted free agent Benoit was not tendered a qualifying offer by the team and was released as a unrestricted free agent. He was signed on August 28, 2023, to a one-year, $775,000 contract by the Toronto Maple Leafs. Benoit failed to make the team out of training camp and was placed on waivers. After going unclaimed, Benoit was assigned to the Maple Leafs' AHL affiliate, the Toronto Marlies. After Timothy Liljegren was injured, Benoit was recalled by the Maple Leafs on November 4. He made his debut with the Maple Leafs in a 6–5 win over the Tampa Bay Lightning on November 6. After 54 games and leading the Leafs in hits with 205 at that juncture in the season, Benoit was rewarded with a three-year extension with the club worth an average value of $1.35 million per year.

During the 2025 Stanley Cup playoffs, Benoit received a primary assist from the overtime goal of Max Domi in Game 2 of the first round series against the Ottawa Senators. Two days later, he scored his first playoff goal, in overtime, in Game 3, at the Canadian Tire Centre in Ottawa, giving the Maple Leafs a 3–0 series lead, reminding those observing of fellow defenceman Cory Cross, who also scored an overtime goal for Toronto during the 2001 Stanley Cup playoffs to give them a 3–0 series lead.

On June 16, 2026, Benoit was traded to the Philadelphia Flyers, alongside Joseph Woll, in exchange for Emil Andrae, Samuel Ersson, and a 2026 third-round pick.

== Personal life ==
Benoit has one child born in September 2024 with his longtime girlfriend.

== Career statistics ==
			Regular season					Playoffs
Season	Team	League	GP	G	A	Pts	PIM	GP	G	A	Pts	PIM
2014–15	Laval-Montréal Rousseau Royal	QMAAA	42	3	11	14	20	4	0	2	2	2
2015–16	Shawinigan Cataractes	QMJHL	55	1	2	3	22	2	0	0	0	0
2016–17	Shawinigan Cataractes	QMJHL	64	2	10	12	47	6	0	0	0	0
2017–18	Shawinigan Cataractes	QMJHL	63	5	23	28	67	—	—	—	—	—
2018–19	San Diego Gulls	AHL	65	2	14	16	33	16	0	3	3	6
2019–20	San Diego Gulls	AHL	56	4	15	19	39	—	—	—	—	—
2020–21	San Diego Gulls	AHL	38	1	7	8	32	3	0	1	1	0
2020–21	Anaheim Ducks	NHL	6	0	0	0	2	—	—	—	—	—
2021–22	San Diego Gulls	AHL	1	0	0	0	0	2	0	0	0	2
2021–22	Anaheim Ducks	NHL	53	1	4	5	22	—	—	—	—	—
2022–23	Anaheim Ducks	NHL	78	3	7	10	60	—	—	—	—	—
2023–24	Toronto Marlies	AHL	2	0	0	0	0	—	—	—	—	—
2023–24	Toronto Maple Leafs	NHL	64	1	4	5	56	7	0	0	0	4
2024–25	Toronto Maple Leafs	NHL	78	1	9	10	59	13	1	1	2	10
2025–26	Toronto Maple Leafs	NHL	73	0	6	6	41	—	—	—	—	—
NHL totals			352	6	30	36	240	20	1	1	2	14
