= Scott Wedgewood =

Canadian ice hockey player (born 1992)

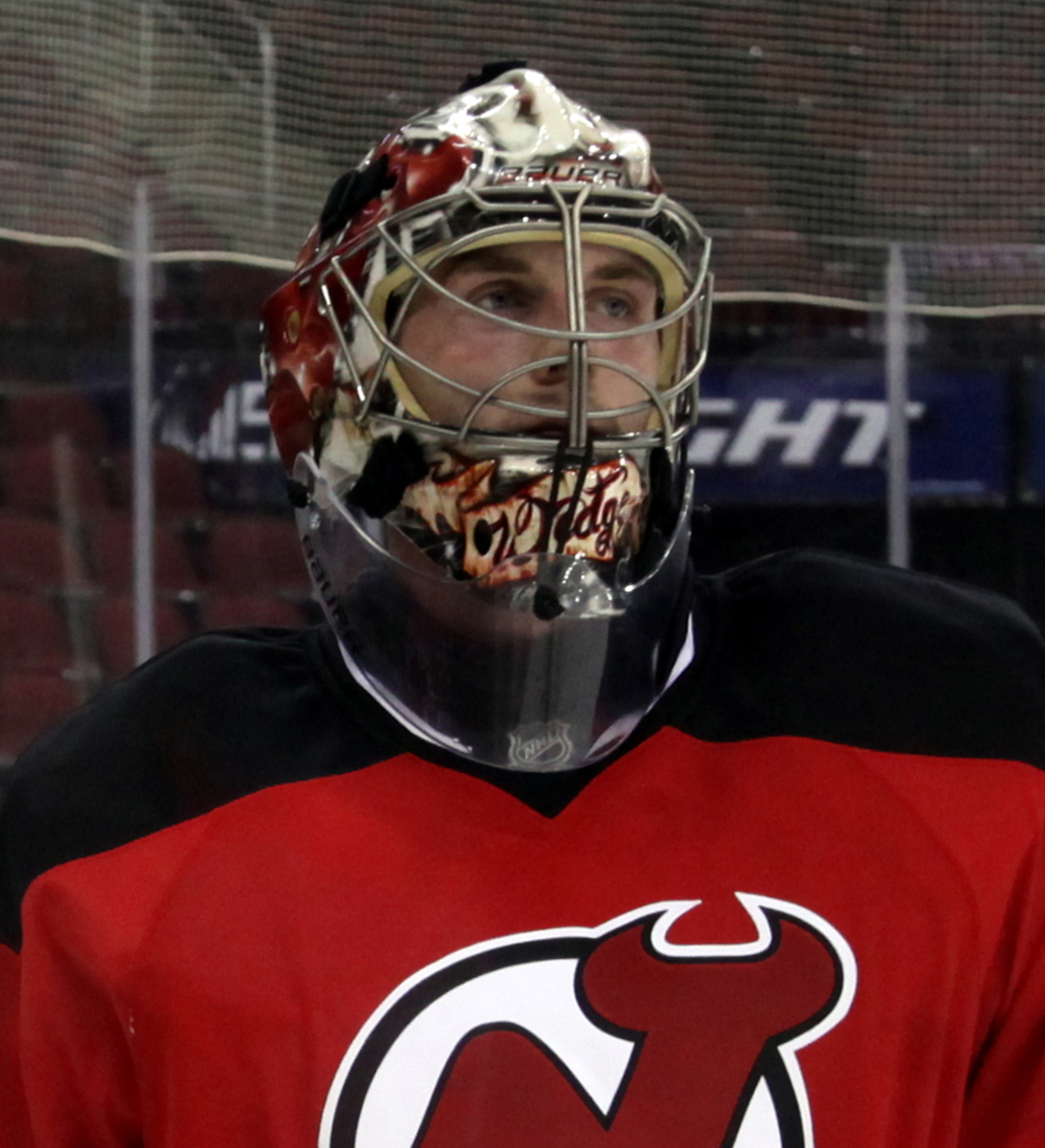
- Wedgewood with the New Jersey Devils in 2015
- Born: August 14, 1992 (age 34) Brampton, Ontario, Canada
- Height: 6 ft 2 in (188 cm)
- Weight: 201 lb (91 kg; 14 st 5 lb)
- Position: Goaltender
- Catches: Left
- NHL team Former teams: Colorado Avalanche; New Jersey Devils; Arizona Coyotes; Dallas Stars; Nashville Predators
- National team: Canada
- NHL draft: 84th overall, 2010; New Jersey Devils
- Playing career: 2012–present

Scott Wedgewood (born August 14, 1992) is a Canadian professional ice hockey player who is a goaltender for the Colorado Avalanche of the National Hockey League (NHL). Wedgewood was selected by the New Jersey Devils in the third round (84th overall) of the 2010 NHL entry draft.

== Playing career ==
=== Junior ===
During the 2009–10 OHL season, Wedgewood served as a backup to goaltender Matt Hackett while playing for the Plymouth Whalers, posting a 5–9–0 record, along with a .909 save percentage and 3.26 goals against average with one shutout during the regular season. After Hackett was suspended in game three of the Western Conference semifinals against the Windsor Spitfires for deliberately injuring an opposing player, Wedgewood made his first career playoff start for the Whalers, making 70 saves in a 3–2 loss in overtime, which later became known as the "Wedgewood Game". His tremendous performance attracted the attention of NHL scouts, and Wedgewood was drafted 84th overall in the third round by the New Jersey Devils in the 2010 NHL entry draft. During his fourth and final year of major junior hockey in the 2011–12 season with the Whalers, Wedgewood was signed by the Devils to a three-year, entry-level contract on March 20, 2012.

=== New Jersey Devils ===
In the 2015–16 season, on March 20, 2016, he won his NHL debut for the Devils against the Columbus Blue Jackets. In his second game for the Devils, Wedgewood recorded his first NHL shutout against the Pittsburgh Penguins.

On July 25, 2017, Wedgewood agreed to return for his sixth season within the Devils organization in agreeing to a one-year, two-way contract extension. He was assigned to begin the 2017–18 season, with inaugural AHL affiliate the Binghamton Devils. He recorded a win in his only game with Binghamton before he was recalled by the Devils due to an injury to starting goaltender Cory Schneider.

=== Arizona Coyotes, Los Angeles Kings ===
With the return to health for Schneider, Wedgewood was traded by the Devils to the Arizona Coyotes in exchange for a fifth-round pick in the 2018 NHL entry draft on October 28, 2017. However, on February 21, 2018, Wedgewood, and forward Tobias Rieder, were traded to the Los Angeles Kings in exchange for goaltender Darcy Kuemper. He did not play with the Kings, and spent the duration of his contract with the Kings' AHL affiliate, the Ontario Reign.

=== Buffalo Sabres and Tampa Bay Lightning ===
As a free agent from the Kings, Wedgewood signed a one-year, two-way contract with the Buffalo Sabres on July 1, 2018. In the 2018–19 season, Wedgewood played exclusively with the Sabres AHL affiliate, the Rochester Americans. In 48 appearances with the Americans he posted 28 wins with a .908 save percentage.

Concluding his contract with the Sabres, Wedgewood left as a free agent to sign a one-year, two-way contract with the Tampa Bay Lightning on July 1, 2019. On December 6, while playing for the Syracuse Crunch, he left the game early because he sustained a lower body injury. He would be out for 4–6 weeks. He returned on January 20, where he made 26 saves in a 4–2 Crunch win over the Utica Comets. Wedgewood was one of the eight players called up to the Lightning for their training camp prior to the 2020 Stanley Cup playoffs.

=== Return to New Jersey and Arizona ===
As a free agent from the Stanley Cup-winning Lightning, Wedgewood returned to the New Jersey Devils, as a free agent in agreeing to a one-year, two-way contract on October 11, 2020. On May 10, 2021, Wedgewood was the Devils nominee for the Bill Masterton Memorial Trophy. On July 6, the Devils re-signed Wedgewood to a one-year, two-way contract.

In the following 2021–22 season, Wedgewood began the season as backup to Jonathan Bernier, in the absence of Mackenzie Blackwood. He appeared in three games before he was placed and later claimed off waivers for a second stint with the Arizona Coyotes on November 4, 2021. With Arizona, he appeared in a career best 26 games, posting a 10–12–2 record, and .911 save percentage. Despite Arizona's struggles as a rebuilding team, Wedgewood showed promise in the NHL as a dependable backup, including a 40-save effort in a win against the Colorado Avalanche that ended their 18-game home win streak, on February 1, 2022.

=== Dallas Stars ===
On March 20, 2022, Wedgewood was traded by Arizona to the Dallas Stars in exchange for a conditional 2023 fourth-round draft pick. Acquired by the Dallas Stars as they sought depth in goal during a push for the playoffs, and with injuries to their primary goaltender, Jake Oettinger, Wedgewood was given an opportunity to make an immediate impact. In eight games with Dallas, he recorded a 3–1–3 record, a .913 SV%, and a 3.05 GAA. One of his standout moments came on April 12, 2022, when he earned a 1–0 shutout victory against the two-time defending Stanley Cup champion and former club, the Tampa Bay Lightning, making 25 saves in the process.

On June 30, 2022, Wedgewood signed a two-year, $2 million contract extension to remain as the backup goaltender with the Stars. In his first full season with Dallas in 2022–23, Wedgewood appeared in 21 games, posting a solid 2.72 goals-against average (GAA) and a .915 save percentage (SV%). Notably, Wedgewood played a crucial role in giving Oettinger rest during the rigorous regular-season schedule. Wedgewood made his post-season debut in the 2023 Stanley Cup playoffs with the Stars, making 3 appearances in relief throughout their run to the Western Conference finals.

Early in the 2023–24 campaign, Wedgewood was thrust into the starting role after an injury sidelined Oettinger in December 2023. During this stretch, Wedgewood excelled, going 7–1–1 while delivering several standout performances, including an overtime save against Elias Pettersson of the Vancouver Canucks that immediately led to a game-winning goal by Matt Duchene on December 21, 2023. His efforts helped maintain the Stars' position near the top of the Central Division standings. By the midpoint of the season, Wedgewood had already matched his previous year's workload. His stats, reflected his resilience under increased pressure and he completed the season having made a career high 32 appearances, and notching 16 wins.

=== Nashville Predators, Colorado Avalanche, and Jennings Trophy ===
After three successful seasons with the Stars, having established himself in the NHL as a backup, Wedgewood left as a free agent and was signed to a two-year, $3 million contract with the Nashville Predators on July 1, 2024. With an injury to starting goaltender Juuse Saros, Wedgewood made his debut with the Predators in the 2024–25 season opening 4–3 defeat against former club, the Dallas Stars, on October 10, 2024. Wedgewood collected 1 win through 5 appearances with the Predators through the opening two months of the campaign before he was traded to divisional opponent the Colorado Avalanche, in exchange for Justus Annunen and a sixth-round selection in the 2025 NHL entry draft on November 30, 2024. Wedgewood made his debut in relief for the Avalanche, posting his 50th career win in helping Colorado overcome a 0–4 deficit en route to a 5–4 regulation victory over the Buffalo Sabres on December 3, 2024. Providing instant stability to the Avalanche's goaltending, Wedgewood posted his seventh career shutout and first in an Avalanche jersey with a 4–0 victory over his original club, the New Jersey Devils, on December 8, 2024.

After leading the NHL in wins through the early 2025–26 season, posting a 10–1–2 record, he signed a one-year contract with the Avalanche on November 13, 2025, to stay with the team through the 2026–27 season. He recorded his first career assist on a goal by Brock Nelson during a game against the New York Rangers in November 20. Following a shutout at the Seattle Kraken on April 16 to conclude the season, Wedgewood and teammate Mackenzie Blackwood won the William M. Jennings Trophy after giving up the fewest goals against, at 197. The last member of the Avalanche to win the trophy was Patrick Roy in the 2001–02 NHL season. Wedgewood led the league in goals against average (2.02) and save percentage (.921), becoming the first Avalanche goaltender to finish the season as the league leader in both categories. He also finished tied for 4th in wins (31) and tied for 3rd in shutouts (4) among all goaltenders. He started and won his first playoff game on April 19, 2026, during game one of the Avalanche's first round match-up against the Los Angeles Kings. During game two of the Avalanche's series against the Los Angeles Kings during the 2026 Stanley Cup playoffs, Wedgewood saved a penalty shot by Quinton Byfield; he became the second goalie in franchise history to make a save on a penalty shot during the playoffs, after Philipp Grubauer. The Avalanche swept the Kings and Wedgewood became the first Avalanche goalie to earn a complete sweep in his first postseason series.

== International play ==
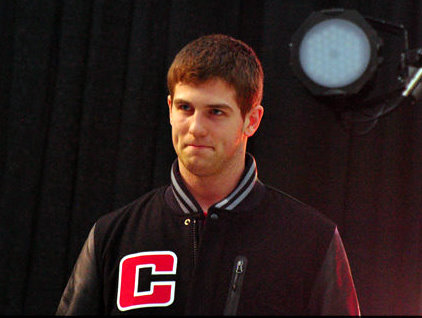
- Wedgewood representing Canada during the 2012 World Juniors

Medal record

Men's ice hockey

Representing Canada

World Junior Championships
Bronze medal – third place	2012 Canada	

Wedgewood represented Canada at the 2012 IIHF World Junior Championships, held in Calgary and Edmonton, Alberta. Sharing the netminding duties with Mark Visentin, he contributed to Canada's undefeated record in the group stage. His standout performance came in a 3–2 victory against the United States, where he made 30 saves to secure the win and help Canada finish atop Group B with a perfect 4–0 record. Entering the net in the semi-finals against Russia, Wedgewood was pulled in a 6–5 loss, marking the first time in 11 years Canada missed the gold medal match. He returned as the backup to help Canada claim the bronze medal, in a 4–0 victory over Finland on January 5, 2012.

== Career statistics ==
=== Regular season and playoffs ===
Bold indicates led league

			Regular season									Playoffs
Season	Team	League	GP	W	L	OT	MIN	GA	SO	GAA	SV%	GP	W	L	MIN	GA	SO	GAA	SV%
2007–08	Mississauga Senators	GTHL	29	—	—	—	1,305	63	0	2.17	—	—	—	—	—	—	—	—	—
2008–09	Plymouth Whalers	OHL	6	0	2	0	158	12	0	4.56	.880	3	0	0	26	2	0	4.62	.931
2009–10	Plymouth Whalers	OHL	18	5	9	0	938	51	1	3.26	.909	4	1	1	116	4	0	2.07	.956
2010–11	Plymouth Whalers	OHL	55	28	18	2	3,046	152	2	2.99	.908	10	4	6	606	33	0	3.27	.923
2011–12	Plymouth Whalers	OHL	43	28	10	3	2,482	125	3	3.02	.911	13	7	6	781	31	2	2.38	.928
2012–13	Trenton Titans	ECHL	48	20	22	5	2,741	147	1	3.22	.900	—	—	—	—	—	—	—	—
2012–13	Albany Devils	AHL	5	2	2	0	242	14	0	3.47	.886	—	—	—	—	—	—	—	—
2013–14	Albany Devils	AHL	36	16	14	3	1,980	79	4	2.39	.899	—	—	—	—	—	—	—	—
2014–15	Albany Devils	AHL	36	13	14	6	2,014	92	2	2.74	.903	—	—	—	—	—	—	—	—
2015–16	Albany Devils	AHL	22	14	3	3	1,241	32	2	1.55	.933	11	6	5	662	30	0	2.72	.897
2015–16	Adirondack Thunder	ECHL	1	1	0	0	60	2	0	2.00	.951	—	—	—	—	—	—	—	—
2015–16	New Jersey Devils	NHL	4	2	1	1	240	5	1	1.25	.927	—	—	—	—	—	—	—	—
2016–17	Albany Devils	AHL	10	5	3	0	550	20	0	2.18	.912	—	—	—	—	—	—	—	—
2017–18	Binghamton Devils	AHL	1	1	0	0	60	1	0	1.00	.973	—	—	—	—	—	—	—	—
2017–18	Arizona Coyotes	NHL	20	5	9	4	1,097	63	1	3.45	.893	—	—	—	—	—	—	—	—
2017–18	Ontario Reign	AHL	6	2	1	1	280	15	0	3.21	.901	—	—	—	—	—	—	—	—
2018–19	Rochester Americans	AHL	48	28	14	2	2,712	121	5	2.68	.908	3	0	3	180	9	0	3.00	.862
2019–20	Syracuse Crunch	AHL	26	13	10	3	1,414	71	1	3.01	.893	—	—	—	—	—	—	—	—
2020–21	New Jersey Devils	NHL	16	3	8	3	889	46	2	3.11	.900	—	—	—	—	—	—	—	—
2021–22	New Jersey Devils	NHL	3	0	2	1	170	9	0	3.19	.880	—	—	—	—	—	—	—	—
2021–22	Arizona Coyotes	NHL	26	10	12	2	1,482	78	0	3.16	.911	—	—	—	—	—	—	—	—
2021–22	Dallas Stars	NHL	8	3	1	3	452	23	1	3.11	.913	—	—	—	—	—	—	—	—
2022–23	Dallas Stars	NHL	21	9	8	3	1,127	51	1	2.72	.915	3	0	0	106	4	0	2.28	.862
2022–23	Texas Stars	AHL	1	0	0	1	61	2	0	1.97	.923	—	—	—	—	—	—	—	—
2023–24	Dallas Stars	NHL	32	16	7	5	1,789	85	0	2.85	.899	—	—	—	—	—	—	—	—
2024–25	Nashville Predators	NHL	5	1	2	1	260	16	0	3.69	.878	—	—	—	—	—	—	—	—
2024–25	Colorado Avalanche	NHL	19	13	4	1	1,113	37	2	1.99	.917	1	0	0	19	0	0	0.00	1.000
2025–26	Colorado Avalanche	NHL	45	31	6	6	2,549	86	4	**2.02**	**.921**	11	7	4	606	25	0	2.47	.904
NHL totals			199	93	60	30	11,166	499	12	2.68	.909	15	7	4	124	29	0	2.38	.902

=== International ===
Year	Team	Event	Result	GP	W	L	T	MIN	GA	SO	GAA	SV%
2012	Canada	WJC	3rd place, bronze medalist(s)	3	2	0	0	149	6	1	2.42	.915
Junior totals				3	2	0	0	149	6	1	2.42	.915

== Awards and honors ==
Award	Year
NHL
William M. Jennings Trophy	2026
