= Ryan McLeod =

Canadian ice hockey player (born 1999)

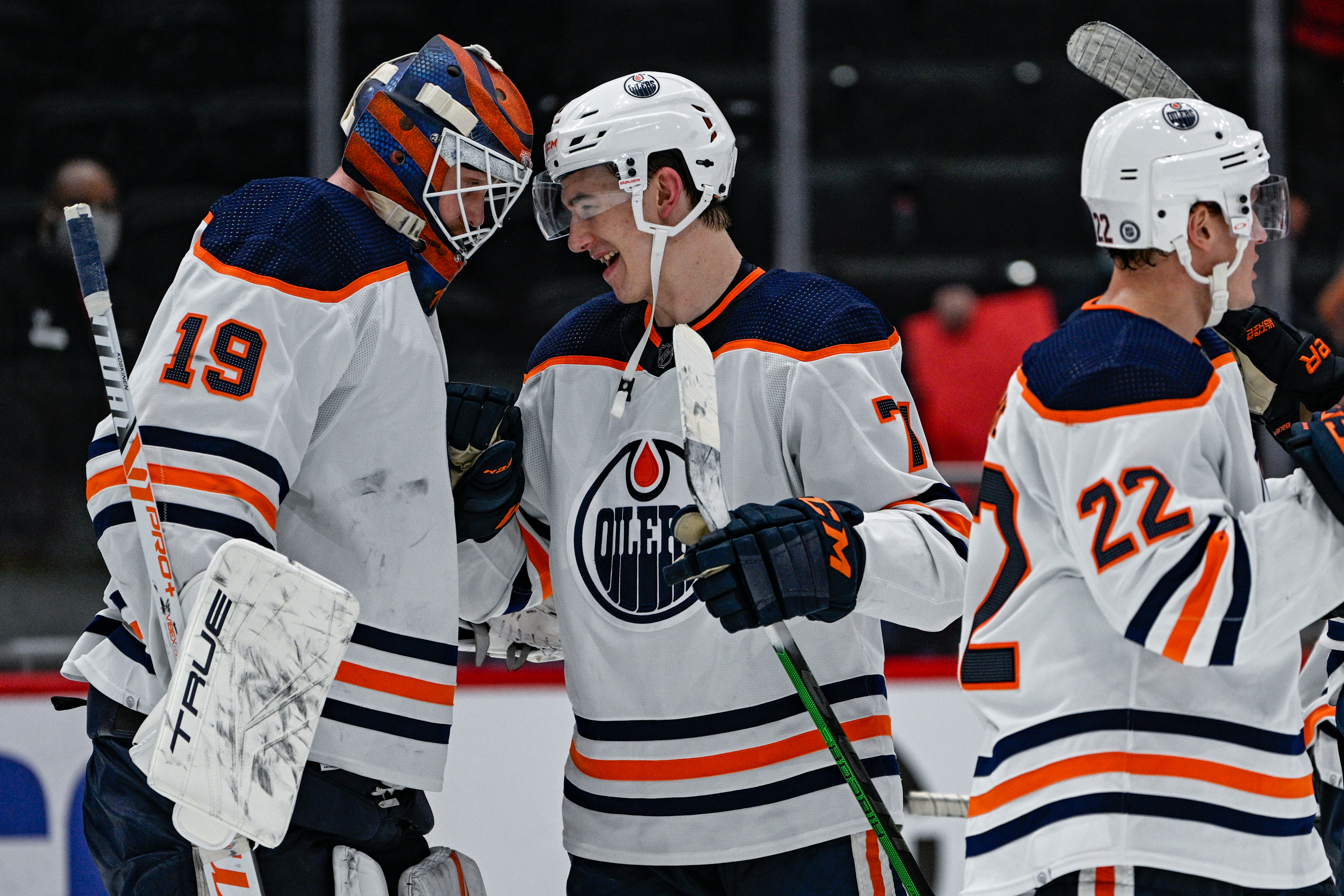
- McLeod (right) celebrates with Mikko Koskinen in 2022.
- Born: September 21, 1999 (age 26) Mississauga, Ontario, Canada
- Height: 6 ft 3 in (191 cm)
- Weight: 204 lb (93 kg; 14 st 8 lb)
- Position: Forward
- Shoots: Left
- NHL team Former teams: Buffalo Sabres; EV Zug; Edmonton Oilers
- NHL draft: 40th overall, 2018; Edmonton Oilers
- Playing career: 2019–present

Ryan McLeod (born September 21, 1999) is a Canadian professional ice hockey player who is a forward for the Buffalo Sabres of the National Hockey League (NHL). He previously played for the Edmonton Oilers in the NHL.

== Playing career ==
=== Amateur ===
McLeod played junior ice hockey for the Toronto Marlboros of the Greater Toronto Hockey League (GTHL). He won the 2015 OHL Cup with the team and was named the championship's most valuable player. In his final season, McLeod also led the Marlboros in scoring and earned the GTHL's Player of the Year Award. He had a brief term with the Oakville Blades of the Ontario Junior Hockey League, appearing in two games as an affiliated player. He was selected by the Flint Firebirds of the Ontario Hockey League (OHL) in the first round, third overall, of the 2015 OHL Priority Selection draft. However, he refused to report to Flint, preferring to play near his home in Mississauga, Ontario. Ultimately, Flint was forced to trade McLeod to the Mississauga Steelheads for eight draft picks spread over three OHL drafts and received an additional first round draft pick in the 2016 OHL Priority Selection draft from the league itself due to McLeod's refusal to report.

He made his major junior ice hockey debut for the Steelheads in the 2015–16 season, appearing in 62 games scoring seven goals and 13 assists for 20 points. The franchise established new highs with their first winning season and made the 2016 OHL playoffs. They faced the Barrie Colts in the first round, with Barrie winning their best-of-seven series four games to three. McLeod recorded two assists in the seven games. He returned to Mississauga for the 2016–17 season, recording nine goals and 42 points in 68 games. The Steelheads made the playoffs again in 2017 and advanced to the OHL finals, losing to the Erie Otters. McLeod broke out in the Steelheads' run, scoring five goals and 20 points in 20 playoff games.

In his third season with Mississauga in 2017–18, McLeod set new career highs with the Steelheads, scoring 26 goals and 70 points in 68 games. The Steelheads made the 2018 OHL playoffs, and faced the Barrie Colts in the first round again. The Colts won the series four games to two. McLeod two goals and five points in the six games. In the 2018–19 season he made 32 appearances for Mississauga, marking 12 goals and 38 points. However, the Steelheads were rebuilding that season, and decided to trade McLeod to the Saginaw Spirit for defenceman Duncan Penman and five draft picks spread over multiple drafts on January 3, 2019. McLeod was immediately placed on the Spirit's first line alongside Cole Perfetti and Owen Tippett. In 31 games with Saginaw, he marked seven goals and 24 points. The Spirit made the 2019 OHL playoffs and advanced to the OHL Western Conference final for the first time in franchise history, but were ultimately eliminated by the Guelph Storm in seven games. McLeod added five goals and 12 points in 17 playoff games.

=== Edmonton Oilers ===
McLeod was selected by the Edmonton Oilers of the National Hockey League (NHL) in the second round, 40th overall, of the 2018 NHL entry draft. He attended the Oilers training camp in 2018, but was returned to his junior team after playing in some pre-season exhibition games. He turned professional at the end of the 2018–19 season, signing an entry-level contract with the Oilers on May 1, 2019. He was assigned to Edmonton's American Hockey League (AHL) affiliate, the Bakersfield Condors, for the 2019 Calder Cup playoffs. He appeared in five playoff games, registering three assists.

He was assigned to the Condors ahead of the 2019–20 season on September 20 and in his AHL rookie season, he recorded five goals and 23 points in 56 games before the season was suspended on March 12, 2020, and later cancelled by the league due to the COVID-19 pandemic. With the 2020–21 NHL season delayed due to the pandemic, McLeod was loaned to the Swiss team EV Zug of the National League (NL) in September 2020. In 15 games in the NL, he scored four goals and 11 points before returning to North America. He returned to Bakersfield where he operated at a point-per-game pace, recording 14 goals and 28 points in 28 games. His improved play earned him a recall to the Oilers' taxi squad late in the season. He made his NHL debut on April 26, 2021, in a 6–1 victory over the Winnipeg Jets. He notched his first NHL point on May 11, assisting on James Neal's first period goal in Edmonton's 4–3 victory over the Montreal Canadiens. He appeared in ten games for the Oilers in the 2020–21 season, registering the one point. The Oilers qualified for the 2020 Stanley Cup playoffs and McLeod made his NHL playoff debut on May 19 in Game 1 of their first round series versus the Winnipeg Jets. He played in all four games of the series, going scoreless, as the Oilers were eliminated by the Jets.

McLeod made the Oilers team out of training for the 2021–22 season. He appeared in two games before being assigned to the AHL. He was recalled in November by the Oilers after centre Devin Shore suffered an injury. In seven games with the Condors, he scored one goal and five points. On November 14, McLeod scored his first NHL goal against Jordan Binnington of the St. Louis Blues in a 5–4 win. On March 28, 2022, he recorded a three-point game with the Oilers, scoring two goals and assisting on another in a 6–1 victory over the Arizona Coyotes. He finished the season having played in 71 games with Edmonton, recording nine goals and 21 points. The Oilers qualified for the 2022 Stanley Cup playoffs and faced the Los Angeles Kings in the first round. In Game 2 of the series on May 4, McLeod scored his first NHL playoff goal and added an assist in a 6–0 win. The Oilers eliminated the Kings and then the Calgary Flames to advance to the Western Conference Finals, losing to the eventual Stanley Cup champion Colorado Avalanche in four games. In 16 playoff games, McLeod scored three goals and four points.

On September 22, McLeod signed a one-year contract extension with the Oilers for the 2022–23 season. With the Oilers from opening night, McLeod registered a three-point game on November 26. He assisted on three of the four goals scored by the Oilers in the third period of a comeback 4–3 win over the New York Rangers. On March 14, 2023, McLeod suffered an injury in a game against the Ottawa Senators. He missed the next ten games before he was placed on long-term injury reserve on April 6. He returned on April 11 after missing 12 games. In 57 games, McLeod scored 11 goals and 23 points. The Oilers made the 2023 Stanley Cup playoffs, but were eliminated in the Western Conference Final by the Vegas Golden Knights. McLeod played in 12 playoff games, recording five assists.

Ahead of the 2023–24 season, McLeod signed a two-year contract with Edmonton on August 1. The Oilers struggled to start the season and head coach Jay Woodcroft was fired on November 12, replaced by Kris Knoblauch. Knoblauch began pairing McLeod with Warren Foegele, even using them on the second line as wingers alongside Leon Draisaitl. He finished the season with 12 goals and 30 points in 81 games. The Oilers made the 2024 Stanley Cup playoffs and in the postseason, McLeod and the penalty kill unit starred. In the Game 1 of the Western Conference Final against Dallas Stars the penalty killing unit held the Stars' power play at bay for four minutes while star forward Connor McDavid was in the penalty box, serving a double minor penalty for high-sticking in the first overtime period. McDavid went on to score the game winning goal in the second overtime. By Game 4 of the series, they had killed off 23 straight penalties. The Oilers advanced to the Stanley Cup Final against the Florida Panthers, where in Game 3 on June 13, McLeod returned to the second line wing alongside Draisaitl but with Dylan Holloway on the other side. McLeod scored in the game, and was later stopped in the final minute by Panthers' goaltender Sergei Bobrovsky to end the Oilers comeback in a 4–3 loss. Facing elimination in Game 4 on June 15, McLeod was the last to score in what ended as a dominating 8–1 victory over the Panthers. In Game 6 on June 21, still trying to stave off elimination, the Oilers won 5–1, with McLeod ending Panthers' attempts at a comeback by scoring an empty-net goal late in the third period. Ultimately, the Oilers lost the Stanley Cup Finals to the Panthers in Game 7, with McLeod finishing the playoffs with four goals in 24 games.

=== Buffalo Sabres ===
McLeod was traded by the Oilers, alongside forward Tyler Tullio, to the Buffalo Sabres in exchange for forward Matthew Savoie on July 5, 2024. McLeod made his Sabres debut on opening night on October 4, playing on the third line alongside Jordan Greenway and Jason Zucker. The game was played in Prague, Czech Republic, as part of the 2024 NHL Global Series. He recorded his first point with Buffalo on October 12, assisting on Mattias Samuelsson's goal in the second period of a 5–2 victory over the Florida Panthers. On October 16, he scored his first goal for the franchise in a 6–5 overtime loss to the Pittsburgh Penguins. On January 15, 2025, McLeod scored his first career hat trick against the Carolina Hurricanes in a 4–2 win, with the third goal being an awarded goal after Hurricanes' defenceman Brent Burns interfered with McLeod.

== Personal life ==
McLeod was born and raised in Mississauga, Ontario, the son of Richard and Judi McLeod and first learned to skate on their backyard rink at the age of 18 months. He has two older brothers who also play professional ice hockey, Matt who plays for the Belfast Giants in Northern Ireland and Michael, who plays in Russia.

In childhood, McLeod was a fan of both the Edmonton Oilers and Toronto Maple Leafs, and said he favoured the Oilers because his favourite player growing up was Ryan Smyth.

== Career statistics ==
=== Regular season and playoffs ===
			Regular season					Playoffs
Season	Team	League	GP	G	A	Pts	PIM	GP	G	A	Pts	PIM
2013–14	Toronto Marlboros	GTHL	2	0	2	2	0	3	0	2	2	4
2014–15	Toronto Marlboros	GTHL	74	30	51	81	46	—	—	—	—	—
2014–15	Oakville Blades	OJHL	2	0	0	0	0	—	—	—	—	—
2015–16	Mississauga Steelheads	OHL	62	7	13	20	16	7	0	2	2	2
2016–17	Mississauga Steelheads	OHL	68	9	33	42	36	20	5	15	20	2
2017–18	Mississauga Steelheads	OHL	68	26	44	70	26	6	2	3	5	6
2018–19	Mississauga Steelheads	OHL	32	12	26	38	17	—	—	—	—	—
2018–19	Saginaw Spirit	OHL	31	7	17	24	16	17	5	7	12	4
2018–19	Bakersfield Condors	AHL	—	—	—	—	—	5	0	3	3	2
2019–20	Bakersfield Condors	AHL	56	5	18	23	22	—	—	—	—	—
2020–21	EV Zug	NL	15	4	7	11	10	—	—	—	—	—
2020–21	Bakersfield Condors	AHL	28	14	14	28	10	—	—	—	—	—
2020–21	Edmonton Oilers	NHL	10	0	1	1	0	4	0	0	0	0
2021–22	Edmonton Oilers	NHL	71	9	12	21	12	16	3	1	4	8
2021–22	Bakersfield Condors	AHL	7	1	4	5	6	—	—	—	—	—
2022–23	Edmonton Oilers	NHL	57	11	12	23	18	12	0	5	5	2
2023–24	Edmonton Oilers	NHL	81	12	18	30	10	24	4	0	4	16
2024–25	Buffalo Sabres	NHL	79	20	33	53	16	—	—	—	—	—
2025–26	Buffalo Sabres	NHL	81	14	40	54	16	13	1	4	5	2
NHL totals			379	66	116	182	72	69	8	10	18	28
NL totals			15	4	7	11	10	—	—	—	—	—

=== International ===
Year	Team	Event	Result	GP	G	A	Pts	PIM
2015	Canada White	U17	1st place, gold medalist(s)	6	0	1	1	4
2016	Canada	IH18	5th	4	0	0	0	4
Junior totals				10	0	1	1	8
