= Michael McLeod (ice hockey) =

Canadian ice hockey player (born 1998)

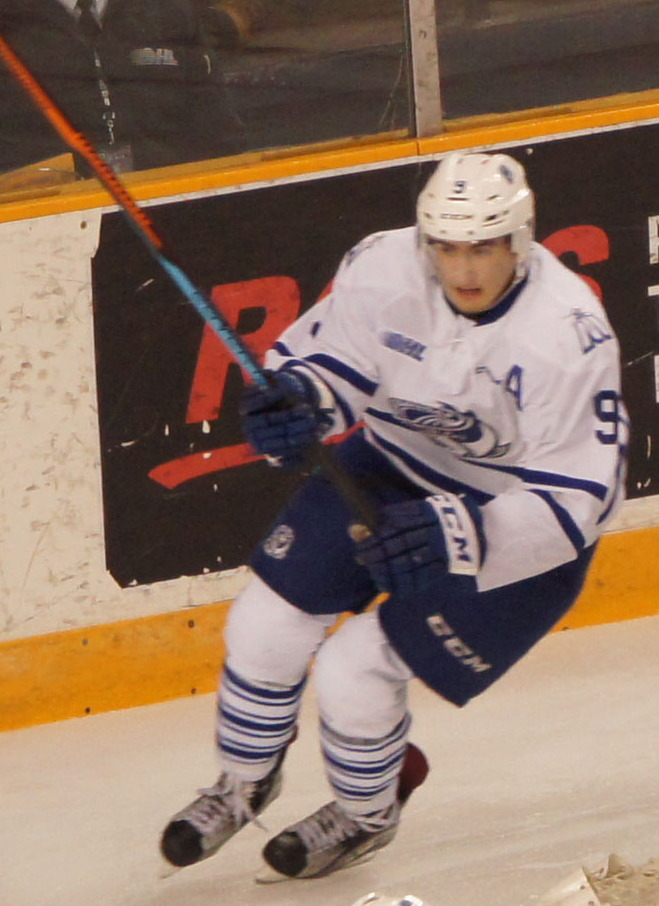
- McLeod with the Mississauga Steelheads in 2016
- Born: February 3, 1998 (age 28) Mississauga, Ontario, Canada
- Height: 6 ft 2 in (188 cm)
- Weight: 190 lb (86 kg; 13 st 8 lb)
- Position: Centre
- Shoots: Right
- KHL team Former teams: Avangard Omsk; New Jersey Devils; Barys Astana
- NHL draft: 12th overall, 2016; New Jersey Devils
- Playing career: 2018–present

Michael McLeod (born February 3, 1998) is a Canadian professional ice hockey player who is a centre for Avangard Omsk of the Kontinental Hockey League (KHL). He was selected by the New Jersey Devils of the National Hockey League (NHL) in the first round, 12th overall, of the 2016 NHL entry draft. He made his NHL debut for the Devils during the 2019–20 NHL season and spent the next five years with New Jersey. In 2025, McLeod was legally acquitted after being charged in the 2018 Hockey Canada controversy and sexual assault.

== Playing career ==
=== Junior ===
McLeod played minor ice hockey with the Toronto Marlboros of the Greater Toronto Hockey League. In 2014, he led his team to capture the OHL Cup and was awarded the Tim Adams Memorial Trophy as OHL Cup's most valuable player.

McLeod was drafted by the Mississauga Steelheads of the Ontario Hockey League (OHL) in the first round (fifth overall) of the 2014 OHL Priority Selection, and played for them beginning with the 2014–15 OHL season. McLeod was named an alternate captain during the 2015–16 OHL season and named the fifth captain of the Steelheads in the following 2016–17 season. During the 2016–17 season, McLeod was named OHL Player of the Week on February 27, 2017, after registering five goals and 11 points in three games.

=== Professional ===
McLeod was selected with the 12th overall pick by the New Jersey Devils of the National Hockey League (NHL) in the 2016 NHL entry draft. On October 7, 2016, the Devils signed McLeod to a three-year, entry-level contract.

In a preseason game on September 25, 2017, McLeod tore his meniscus in his left knee and required arthroscopic surgery. When he was activated from injured reserve he was reassigned to the Mississauga Steelheads.

On April 3, 2018, McLeod was assigned to the Binghamton Devils of the American Hockey League (AHL) following the conclusion of his OHL career. McLeod was recalled for the first time by New Jersey on November 29, 2018, following Jean-Sébastien Dea being picked up on waivers by the Pittsburgh Penguins. He made his NHL debut the following night in a 6–3 loss to the Washington Capitals, and was sent back to Binghamton the following day. McLeod got into 21 games with the Devils during the 2018–19 season, registering just three points (all assists). On January 27, 2021, McLeod scored his first NHL goal in a 5–3 loss to the Philadelphia Flyers, his 39th game.

McLeod set a career high in points in a season during the 2022–23 season, registering 26 points in 80 games. On May 1, 2023, McLeod scored the first and ultimately game- and series-winning goal in New Jersey's 4–0 win over the rival New York Rangers in game 7 of the first round of the 2023 Stanley Cup playoffs. He finished the playoffs with two goals and six points in 12 playoff games for the Devils.

McLeod signed a one-year, $1.4 million contract to stay with the Devils on July 1, 2023. On January 24, 2024, the Devils announced that McLeod and defenceman Cal Foote were granted indefinite leaves of absence from the team. At the end of the season, in which he did not return to play, he had 19 points in 45 games on the strength of a career-best 10 goals.

On August 2, 2024, McLeod signed a one-year contract with Barys Astana of the Kontinental Hockey League (KHL), joining former Devils teammate Will Butcher with the Kazakhstani club to start the 2024–25 season. On October 18, McLeod was released from his contract with the last-place club following just 16 appearances and a team-best six points. Five more North Americans, including Butcher, were released by the club over the following month, a move that The Hockey News called "an apparent cost-cutting measure." On November 19, McLeod signed with another KHL club, Avangard Omsk, playing 19 regular season games, and nine games in the playoffs for them.

On September 11, 2025, the NHL announced McLeod would be eligible to sign a contract on October 15, and would be eligible to return to play on December 1.

On October 9, 2025, McLeod signed a three-year contract worth ₽245M (approximately $3M USD) with Avangard Omsk of the KHL.

== International play ==
Medal record

Men's ice hockey

Representing Canada

World Junior Championship
Gold medal – first place	2018 United States	
Silver medal – second place	2017 Canada	

Ivan Hlinka Memorial Tournament
Gold medal – first place	2015 Czech Republic/Slovakia	

McLeod was selected as the 13th forward to the Canada national junior team for the 2017 World Junior Championships. After an injury to Mitchell Stephens, McLeod took his place on the active Canada roster. He was one of seven returning players for the 2018 World Junior Championships.

== Personal life ==
McLeod is the older brother of Ryan McLeod, who is a member of the Buffalo Sabres. His other brother, Matt McLeod, plays for the Belfast Giants of the British Elite Ice Hockey League (EIHL). He is close friends with former Steelheads and Devils teammate Nathan Bastian.

On January 30, 2024, McLeod and four other teammates were charged with sexual assault after a 2018 alleged assault in London, Ontario. On February 5, the London Police Service announced that McLeod had been charged with two counts of sexual assault. The trial began in April 2025, and trial proceedings were declared a mistrial twice, before the jury was dismissed and the justice adjudicated the case herself. On July 24, 2025, he was acquitted on both charges.

== Career statistics ==
=== Regular season and playoffs ===
			Regular season					Playoffs
Season	Team	League	GP	G	A	Pts	PIM	GP	G	A	Pts	PIM
2013–14	Toronto Marlboros	GTHL	33	21	36	57	20	16	10	5	15	24
2014–15	Mississauga Steelheads	OHL	63	12	17	29	33	—	—	—	—	—
2015–16	Mississauga Steelheads	OHL	57	21	40	61	71	7	3	6	9	6
2016–17	Mississauga Steelheads	OHL	57	27	46	73	49	20	11	16	27	19
2017–18	Mississauga Steelheads	OHL	38	16	28	44	34	6	6	4	10	11
2017–18	Binghamton Devils	AHL	6	0	1	1	2	—	—	—	—	—
2018–19	Binghamton Devils	AHL	55	6	27	33	43	—	—	—	—	—
2018–19	New Jersey Devils	NHL	21	0	3	3	13	—	—	—	—	—
2019–20	Binghamton Devils	AHL	47	8	15	23	59	—	—	—	—	—
2019–20	New Jersey Devils	NHL	12	0	2	2	4	—	—	—	—	—
2020–21	New Jersey Devils	NHL	52	9	6	15	42	—	—	—	—	—
2021–22	New Jersey Devils	NHL	77	6	14	20	52	—	—	—	—	—
2022–23	New Jersey Devils	NHL	80	4	22	26	43	12	2	4	6	15
2023–24	New Jersey Devils	NHL	45	10	9	19	10	—	—	—	—	—
2024–25	Barys Astana	KHL	16	3	3	6	16	—	—	—	—	—
2024–25	Avangard Omsk	KHL	19	3	10	13	21	9	1	7	8	6
2025–26	Avangard Omsk	KHL	55	22	26	48	37	17	1	10	11	6
NHL totals			287	29	56	85	164	12	2	4	6	15
KHL totals			90	28	39	67	74	26	2	17	19	12

=== International ===
Year	Team	Event	Result	GP	G	A	Pts	PIM
2014	Canada Red	U17	6th	5	0	1	1	2
2015	Canada	IH18	1st place, gold medalist(s)	4	1	1	2	2
2016	Canada	U18	4th	7	2	2	4	2
2017	Canada	WJC	2nd place, silver medalist(s)	7	2	1	3	2
2018	Canada	WJC	1st place, gold medalist(s)	7	1	3	4	2
Junior totals				30	6	8	14	10

== Awards and honours ==
Award	Year	Ref
Tim Adams Memorial Trophy	2014	

Awards and achievements
Preceded by Pavel Zacha	New Jersey Devils first-round draft pick 2016	Succeeded by Nico Hischier
