= Brampton Steelheads =

Ontario Hockey League team in Brampton, Ontario

- City: Brampton, Ontario
- League: Ontario Hockey League
- Conference: Eastern
- Division: Central
- Operated: 2024–present
- Home arena: CAA Centre
- Colours: Blue, white, silver
- General manager: James Richmond
- Head coach: James Richmond

Franchise history
- 1996–2007: Toronto St. Michael's Majors
- 2007–2012: Mississauga St. Michael's Majors
- 2012–2024: Mississauga Steelheads
- 2024–present: Brampton Steelheads

Current uniform

The Brampton Steelheads are a Canadian junior ice hockey team in the Ontario Hockey League (OHL), based in Brampton, Ontario. The Steelheads play their home games at the CAA Centre in Brampton. The team relocated from nearby Mississauga in 2024. As the Mississauga Steelheads, the team previously won the Emms Trophy as regular season champions of the Central division and the Bobby Orr Trophy as playoffs champions of the Eastern conference during the 2016–17 OHL season.

== History ==
The OHL originated in Mississauga with the Mississauga IceDogs. The IceDogs played in Mississauga from 1998 to 2007 before being purchased by Ottawa Senators owner Eugene Melnyk in 2006. Following the 2006–2007 season, Melnyk sold the Icedogs who moved to St. Catharines to become the Niagara IceDogs. At the same time Melynk moved the Toronto St. Michael's Majors to Mississauga to become the Mississauga St. Michael's Majors. The Majors played in Mississauga from 2007 to 2012, also hosting the 2011 Memorial Cup. Following the 2012 season Melnyk sold the Majors franchise to Elliott Kerr of Mississauga's Landmark Sport Group. As a part of the sale, the Majors identity was returned to St. Michael's College, allowing the team to move forward under the fan-selected "Steelheads" moniker.

The Steelheads struggled in their first season in 2012–13 finishing last in the OHL Central division and eighth overall in the Eastern Conference before losing to the Belleville Bulls in six games in the first round. Before the 2013–14 season the Steelheads drafted 15-year-old Sean Day. Day had applied for and been granted Exceptional Player Status to be able to be drafted into the OHL at 15 years old. In the 2013–14 season the Steelheads again finished last in the Central division and eighth in the Eastern Conference, this time being swept by the number one ranked Oshawa Generals in four games in the first round of the 2014 OHL playoffs. In 2014–15, the Steelheads finished in fourth in the Central division ahead of the Sudbury Wolves but missed the 2015 OHL playoffs finishing five points back. In 2015–16, thanks to strong performances by a trio of top 2016 NHL entry draft picks (Alexander Nylander, Michael McLeod, Nathan Bastian) the Steelheads finished above .500 for the first time and ended the season in seventh in the Eastern Conference standings,(fourth in their division). Again though the Steelheads would fall in the first round losing to the Barrie Colts in seven games.

The 2016–17 season was backed by continued strong performances by Bastian and McLeod as well as a breakout 44-goal season from 2017 first round draft Pick Owen Tippett, the Steelheads won their first Central division title. Entering the 2017 OHL playoffs as the second seed in the Eastern Conference, the Steelheads defeated the Ottawa 67's in six games in the first round before defeating the Oshawa Generals in five games in the second round. In the Eastern Conference Finals the Steelheads swept the Peterborough Petes in four games to win their first Bobby Orr Trophy in franchise history. The Steelheads would fall in the J. Ross Robertson Cup Finals in five games to the Erie Otters.

In 2017–18, Mississauga returned to the bottom of the Eastern Conference ending the season in seventh place (fourth in the Central division). The Barrie Colts once again defeated the Steelheads in the first round of the playoffs, this time in six games. In 2018–19, Mississauga was the best team of a weak bottom half of the OHL Eastern Conference finishing in fifth place but 20 points back of Sudbury in fourth. In the playoffs the Wolves easily swept Mississauga in four games. The 2019–20 OHL season was cancelled before completion of the regular season, the J. Ross Robertson Cup or the 2020 Memorial Cup in Kelowna. At the time of cancellation the Steelheads sat in sixth place in the OHL Eastern Conference with a record of 27–29–4–1, but 17 points up on ninth place, which would have guaranteed the Steelheads a seventh playoff appearance in eight seasons.

The Steelheads proposed to relocate to Brampton for at least the 2024–25 OHL season, pending approval from the OHL. The relocation was approved by the OHL in June 2024, with the franchise retaining the Steelheads name. Brampton previously had an OHL team from 1998 until 2013, playing as the Brampton Battalion, before moving to North Bay as the North Bay Battalion.

== Uniforms and mascot ==
The primary logo for the Steelheads displays a Steelhead trout below the word Brampton with a maple leaf after it. The Steelheads colours are blue and white. The secondary logo previously featured the Port Credit lighthouse within an M, representing the Mississauga landmark.

The Steelheads' blue and white uniforms bear a striking resemblance to those of the nearby Toronto Maple Leafs of the National Hockey League (NHL); their home sweaters were white with blue striping and collars, while their road sweaters are blue with white striping and collars. Due to the similarities, the team needed approval from the NHL before using the design.

The team mascot while playing in Mississauga was named Sauga. The name was created during a fan contest during the summer of 2012, when the organization asked its fans to create a name for the new Steelheads mascot.

== Championships ==
- Bobby Orr Trophy – 2016-17
- Emms Trophy – 2016–17

== Season-by-season results ==
Regular season and playoffs results:

- Mississauga Steelheads (2012–2024)
- Brampton Steelheads (2024–present)

Legend: GP = Games played, W = Wins, L = Losses, T = Ties, OTL = Overtime losses, SL = Shoot-out losses, Pts = Points, GF = Goals for, GA = Goals against

Memorial Cup champions	OHL champions	OHL finalists

Season	Regular season										Playoffs
Season	GP	W	L	OTL	SOL	Pts	Pct	GF	GA	Finish	Playoffs
2012–13	68	26	34	0	8	60	0.441	179	221	5th, Central	Lost conference quarterfinals (Belleville Bulls) 2–4
2013–14	68	24	38	1	5	54	0.397	167	267	5th, Central	Lost conference quarterfinals (Oshawa Generals) 0–4
2014–15	68	25	40	2	1	53	0.390	178	265	4th, Central	Did not qualify
2015–16	68	33	30	2	3	71	0.522	215	229	4th, Central	Lost conference quarterfinals (Barrie Colts) 3–4
2016–17	68	34	21	6	7	81	0.596	240	219	1st, Central	Won conference quarterfinals (Ottawa 67's) 4–2; Won conference semifinals (Oshawa Generals) 4–1; Won conference finals (Peterborough Petes) 4–0; Lost OHL finals (Erie Otters) 1–4
2017–18	68	33	32	1	2	69	0.507	251	250	4th, Central	Lost conference quarterfinals (Barrie Colts) 2–4
2018–19	68	32	29	5	2	71	0.522	239	250	3rd, Central	Lost conference quarterfinals (Sudbury Wolves) 0–4
2019–20	61	27	29	4	1	59	0.484	223	227	3rd, Central	Playoffs cancelled due to the COVID-19 pandemic
2020–21	Season cancelled due to the COVID-19 pandemic										
2021–22	68	37	23	2	6	82	0.603	229	189	2nd, Central	Won conference quarterfinals (Barrie Colts) 4–2; Lost conference semifinals (Hamilton Bulldogs) 0–4
2022–23	68	31	31	6	0	68	0.500	226	258	4th, Central	Lost conference quarterfinals (North Bay Battalion) 2–4
2023–24	68	38	22	8	0	84	0.618	248	212	2nd, Central	Lost conference quarterfinals (Sudbury Wolves) 1–4
2024–25	68	36	22	10	0	82	0.603	298	240	2nd, Central	Lost conference quarterfinals (Oshawa Generals) 2–4
2025–26	68	19	38	6	4	48	0.353	164	246	5th, Central	Did not qualify

== Head coaches ==
- 2012–2016: James Boyd
- 2016–present: James Richmond

== NHL alumni ==
List of Steelheads alumni to play in the National Hockey League (NHL):

- Nathan Bastian
- Owen Beck
- Trevor Carrick
- Sean Day
- Luca Del Bel Belluz
- Ethan Del Mastro
- Dylan DeMelo
- Nicolas Hague
- Thomas Harley
- Mason Marchment
- Spencer Martin
- Porter Martone
- Michael McLeod
- Ryan McLeod
- Jacob Moverare
- Alexander Nylander
- Stuart Percy
- Cole Schwindt
- Owen Tippett

== See also ==
- List of ice hockey teams in Ontario
