= 2023 Stanley Cup playoffs =

NHL postseason tournament

Tournament details
- Dates: April 17 – June 13, 2023
- Teams: 16
- Defending champions: Colorado Avalanche

Final positions
- Champions: Vegas Golden Knights
- Runners-up: Florida Panthers

Tournament statistics
- Scoring leader(s): Jack Eichel (Golden Knights) (26 points)

Awards
- MVP: Jonathan Marchessault (Golden Knights)

The 2023 Stanley Cup playoffs was the playoff tournament of the National Hockey League (NHL) for the 2022–23 season. The playoffs began on April 17, 2023, three days after the end of the regular season, and concluded on June 13, 2023, with the Vegas Golden Knights winning their first Stanley Cup in franchise history, defeating the Florida Panthers four games to one in the Stanley Cup Final.

The Boston Bruins made the playoffs as the Presidents' Trophy winners after setting the league record for the most wins and points in a single regular season. The Pittsburgh Penguins failed to make the playoffs for the first time since the 2005–06 NHL season, ending both the NHL's and major North American sports' longest active playoff streak at sixteen consecutive seasons. The new longest active playoffs streak in major North American sports belonged to MLB's Los Angeles Dodgers, who qualified for the postseason every year since 2013. The longest active Stanley Cup playoff streak moved to both the Boston Bruins and Toronto Maple Leafs at seven consecutive seasons after both the Nashville Predators and Washington Capitals also had their eight-season playoff streaks ended after they both also failed to make the playoffs for the first time since the 2013–14 NHL season. As a result, this is the first time since 1976 that the longest active playoff streak was less than ten consecutive seasons. The Seattle Kraken became the second fastest NHL expansion team since 1991 to qualify for the playoffs, after the Vegas Golden Knights, and the first to clinch their inaugural playoff appearance in their second season in the league since the Quebec Nordiques in 1981. The Kraken also became the first NHL exclusive expansion team to make their first playoff appearance in their second season since the Atlanta Flames in 1974. All three New York metropolitan area teams (the Devils, Islanders and Rangers) made the playoffs in the same year for the first time since 2007. For the first time since 1990 and second time since entering the NHL as expansion teams in the 1967–68 NHL season, both Pennsylvania-based teams (the Flyers and Penguins) missed the playoffs in the same season. For the first time since 2006 both the Pittsburgh Penguins and the Washington Capitals missed the playoffs in the same season.

This postseason marked the second consecutive and fourth time overall that the league played 50 or more games in the opening round of the playoffs since this round was changed to a best-of-seven format in 1987. In addition, visiting teams in the first round went 31–19 overall to set a new league record for the most road wins in a single round. Among these opening round road victories, the Florida Panthers overcame a 3–1 series deficit to upset the Presidents' Trophy-winning Boston Bruins in seven games, the Seattle Kraken defeated the defending champion Colorado Avalanche in seven games to win their first playoff series, and the Toronto Maple Leafs eliminated the Tampa Bay Lightning on the road in game six to win their first series since the 2004 Eastern Conference quarterfinals.

For the fourth consecutive season and the seventh time in nine years, a Florida-based team reached the conference finals/semifinals and reached the Stanley Cup Final for the fourth straight season. For the first time, the conference finals consisted exclusively of teams located in the Sun Belt, with the Florida Panthers and the Carolina Hurricanes in the Eastern Conference final, and the Dallas Stars and the Vegas Golden Knights in the Western Conference final.

== Playoff seeds ==
This was the eighth year in which the top three teams in each division made the playoffs, along with two wild cards in each conference (for a total of eight playoff teams from each conference).

The following teams qualified for the playoffs:

=== Eastern Conference ===
==== Atlantic Division ====
1. Boston Bruins, Atlantic Division champions, Eastern Conference regular season champions, Presidents' Trophy winners – 135 points
2. Toronto Maple Leafs – 111 points
3. Tampa Bay Lightning – 98 points

==== Metropolitan Division ====
1. Carolina Hurricanes, Metropolitan Division champions – 113 points
2. New Jersey Devils – 112 points
3. New York Rangers – 107 points

==== Wild cards ====
1. New York Islanders – 93 points
2. Florida Panthers – 92 points

=== Western Conference ===
==== Central Division ====
1. Colorado Avalanche, Central Division champions – 109 points
2. Dallas Stars – 108 points
3. Minnesota Wild – 103 points

==== Pacific Division ====
1. Vegas Golden Knights, Pacific Division champions, Western Conference regular season champions – 111 points
2. Edmonton Oilers – 109 points
3. Los Angeles Kings – 104 points

==== Wild cards ====
1. Seattle Kraken – 100 points
2. Winnipeg Jets – 95 points

== Playoff bracket ==
In each round, teams competed in a best-of-seven series following a 2–2–1–1–1 format (scores in the bracket indicate the number of games won in each best-of-seven series). The team with home ice advantage played at home for games one and two (and games five and seven, if necessary), and the other team was at home for games three and four (and game six, if necessary). The top three teams in each division made the playoffs, along with two wild cards in each conference, for a total of eight teams from each conference.

In the first round, the lower seeded wild card in the conference played against the division winner with the best record while the other wild card played against the other division winner, and both wild cards were de facto #4 seeds. The other series matched the second and third-place teams from the divisions. In the first two rounds, home-ice advantage was awarded to the team with the better seed. Thereafter, it was awarded to the team that had the better regular season record.

First round	Second round
A1	Boston	3
WC2	Florida	4
WC2	Florida	4
A2	Toronto	1
A2	Toronto	4
A3	Tampa Bay	2
Eastern Conference
M1	Carolina	4
WC1	NY Islanders	2
M1	Carolina	4
M2	New Jersey	1
M2	New Jersey	4
M3	NY Rangers	3
C1	Colorado	3
WC1	Seattle	4
WC1	Seattle	3
C2	Dallas	4
C2	Dallas	4
C3	Minnesota	2
Western Conference
P1	Vegas	4
WC2	Winnipeg	1
P1	Vegas	4
P2	Edmonton	2
P2	Edmonton	4
P3	Los Angeles	2

Conference finals
WC2	Florida	4
M1	Carolina	0
C2	Dallas	2
P1	Vegas	4

Stanley Cup Final
WC2	Florida	1
P1	Vegas	4

Legend

- A1, A2, A3 – The first, second, and third place teams from the Atlantic Division, respectively
- M1, M2, M3 – The first, second, and third place teams from the Metropolitan Division, respectively
- C1, C2, C3 – The first, second, and third place teams from the Central Division, respectively
- P1, P2, P3 – The first, second, and third place teams from the Pacific Division, respectively
- WC1, WC2 – The first and second place teams in the Wild Card, respectively

== First round ==
=== Eastern Conference first round ===
==== (A1) Boston Bruins vs. (WC2) Florida Panthers ====
The Boston Bruins earned the Presidents' Trophy as the NHL's best regular season team with a record-setting 135 points. Florida earned 92 points to finish as the Eastern Conference's second wild card. This was the second playoff meeting between these two teams. Their only previous meeting was in the 1996 Eastern Conference quarterfinals, which Florida won in five games. These teams split their four-game regular season series.

The Panthers defeated the Bruins in seven games after being down 3–1 in the series, in one of the greatest upsets in NHL history. In game one, goaltender Linus Ullmark made 31 saves to backstop the Bruins in a 3–1 victory. A four-goal third period, coupled with Brandon Montour's two goals helped the Panthers win game two 6–3. In game three, Taylor Hall had a goal and an assist for Boston defeating Florida 4–2. Hall scored twice and provided two assists in game four for the Bruins, giving Boston a 3–1 series lead with a 6–2 victory. In game five, the Bruins had a chance to win the game at the end of regulation, but Sergei Bobrovsky made the save on Brad Marchand's breakaway to send the game into overtime. Carter Verhaeghe assisted on three goals including the Panthers' overtime goal scored by Matthew Tkachuk, keeping Florida alive in the series with a 4–3 victory. Tkachuk scored twice and provided an assist in a high-scoring affair between Florida and Boston in game six, defeating the Bruins 7–5 to force a seventh game. In game seven, after the Panthers rallied a late goal to tie the game, Verhaeghe scored in the subsequent overtime to send Florida to the second round.

April 17	Florida Panthers	1–3	Boston Bruins	TD Garden	Recap
No scoring		First period	05:58 – pp – David Pastrnak (1)
Matthew Tkachuk (1) – 06:34		Second period	03:41 – Brad Marchand (1); 17:32 – Jake DeBrusk (1)
No scoring		Third period	No scoring
Alex Lyon 26 saves / 29 shots		Goalie stats	Linus Ullmark 31 saves / 32 shots

April 19	Florida Panthers	6–3	Boston Bruins	TD Garden	Recap
No scoring		First period	No scoring
Sam Bennett (1) – 01:42; Eric Staal (1) – 14:18		Second period	12:13 – sh – Brad Marchand (2); 17:01 – pp – Tyler Bertuzzi (1)
Brandon Montour (1) – 00:22; Carter Verhaeghe (1) – 07:00; Brandon Montour (2) – 12:30; Eetu Luostarinen (1) – en – 17:35		Third period	18:50 – Taylor Hall (1)
Alex Lyon 34 saves / 37 shots		Goalie stats	Linus Ullmark 24 saves / 29 shots

April 21	Boston Bruins	4–2	Florida Panthers	FLA Live Arena	Recap
Taylor Hall (2) – 02:26		First period	No scoring
Charlie Coyle (1) – 06:00		Second period	No scoring
David Pastrnak (2) – 08:32; Nick Foligno (1) – 11:45		Third period	14:41 – sh – Gustav Forsling (1); 15:59 – Sam Reinhart (1)
Linus Ullmark 29 saves / 31 shots		Goalie stats	Alex Lyon 23 saves / 26 shots Sergei Bobrovsky 8 saves / 9 shots

April 23	Boston Bruins	6–2	Florida Panthers	FLA Live Arena	Recap
Brad Marchand (3) – pp – 09:45		First period	No scoring
Jake DeBrusk (2) – pp – 01:52		Second period	16:00 – Matthew Tkachuk (2)
Tyler Bertuzzi (2) – 02:26; Jake DeBrusk (3) – 08:05; Taylor Hall (3) – 16:24; Taylor Hall (4) – en – 19:31		Third period	06:11 – pp – Sam Bennett (2)
Linus Ullmark 41 saves / 43 shots Jeremy Swayman 1 save / 1 shot		Goalie stats	Sergei Bobrovsky 25 saves / 30 shots

April 26	Florida Panthers	4–3	OT	Boston Bruins	TD Garden	Recap
Anthony Duclair (1) – 08:26		First period		No scoring
Sam Bennett (3) – 18:52		Second period		02:27 – pp – Brad Marchand (4)
Sam Reinhart (2) – pp – 05:14		Third period		04:33 – pp – Patrice Bergeron (1); 09:16 – Taylor Hall (5)
Matthew Tkachuk (3) – 06:05		First overtime period		No scoring
Sergei Bobrovsky 44 saves / 47 shots		Goalie stats		Linus Ullmark 21 saves / 25 shots

April 28	Boston Bruins	5–7	Florida Panthers	FLA Live Arena	Recap
Tyler Bertuzzi (3) – pp – 06:09		First period	02:01 – pp – Brandon Montour (3); 13:52 – Matthew Tkachuk (4)
David Pastrnak (3) – pp – 05:42		Second period	09:22 – Aleksander Barkov (1)
Tyler Bertuzzi (4) – 01:31; David Pastrnak (4) – pp – 03:53; Jake DeBrusk (4) – sh – 10:22		Third period	07:21 – Zac Dalpe (1); 10:49 – pp – Matthew Tkachuk (5); 14:22 – Eetu Luostarinen (2); 19:32 – en – Sam Reinhart (3)
Linus Ullmark 26 saves / 32 shots		Goalie stats	Sergei Bobrovsky 29 saves / 34 shots

April 30	Florida Panthers	4–3	OT	Boston Bruins	TD Garden	Recap
Brandon Montour (4) – pp – 12:23		First period		No scoring
Sam Reinhart (4) – 01:14		Second period		07:52 – pp – David Krejci (1)
Brandon Montour (5) – 19:00		Third period		00:55 – pp – Tyler Bertuzzi (5); 04:11 – David Pastrnak (5)
Carter Verhaeghe (2) – 08:35		First overtime period		No scoring
Sergei Bobrovsky 33 saves / 36 shots		Goalie stats		Jeremy Swayman 27 saves / 31 shots

Florida won series 4–3

==== (A2) Toronto Maple Leafs vs. (A3) Tampa Bay Lightning ====
The Toronto Maple Leafs finished second in the Atlantic Division, earning 111 points. The Tampa Bay Lightning earned 98 points to finish third in the Atlantic Division. This was the second consecutive and the second overall playoff meeting between these two teams. Tampa Bay won the previous year's Eastern Conference first-round series in seven games. Toronto won two of the three games in this year's regular season series.

The Maple Leafs defeated the Lightning in six games, winning their first playoff series since 2004. The Lightning scored four power play goals in game one, outscoring the Maple Leafs in a 7–3 victory. In game two, Maple Leafs captain John Tavares scored a hat trick and Ryan O'Reilly provided four assists for Toronto's 7–2 victory. O'Reilly scored a goal and two assists in the Maple Leafs' game three victory where Morgan Rielly scored the overtime goal in a 4–3 triumph. In game four, the Maple Leafs overcame a three-goal deficit led by two goals from Auston Matthews, and in the subsequent overtime, Alexander Kerfoot tipped in a shot to give Toronto a 5–4 victory and 3–1 series lead. The Lightning kept their season alive, being backed by a 28-save performance from Andrei Vasilevskiy in game five for a 4–2 victory. In game six and with overtime required, Tavares scored to send Toronto to the second round with a 2–1 victory.

April 18	Tampa Bay Lightning	7–3	Toronto Maple Leafs	Scotiabank Arena	Recap
Pierre-Edouard Bellemare (1) – 01:18; Anthony Cirelli (1) – 07:18; Nikita Kucherov (1) – pp – 19:56		First period	No scoring
Brayden Point (1) – pp – 14:29; Corey Perry (1) – pp – 17:54; Brayden Point (2) – pp – 19:58		Second period	08:06 – pp – Ryan O'Reilly (1); 13:11 – pp – William Nylander (1)
Ross Colton (1) – 06:59		Third period	08:06 – Calle Jarnkrok (1)
Andrei Vasilevskiy 28 saves / 31 shots		Goalie stats	Ilya Samsonov 23 saves / 29 shots Joseph Woll 4 saves / 5 shots

April 20	Tampa Bay Lightning	2–7	Toronto Maple Leafs	Scotiabank Arena	Recap
No scoring		First period	00:47 – pp – Mitch Marner (1); 12:45 – John Tavares (1); 15:08 – William Nylander (2)
Ian Cole (1) – 08:58		Second period	13:14 – John Tavares (2); 15:52 – Zach Aston-Reese (1); 18:02 – Mitch Marner (2)
Corey Perry (2) – 12:38		Third period	15:06 – pp – John Tavares (3)
Andrei Vasilevskiy 30 saves / 37 shots		Goalie stats	Ilya Samsonov 20 saves / 22 shots

April 22	Toronto Maple Leafs	4–3	OT	Tampa Bay Lightning	Amalie Arena	Recap
Noel Acciari (1) – 03:24; Auston Matthews (1) – 11:10		First period		04:50 – Anthony Cirelli (2); 19:28 – Brandon Hagel (1)
No scoring		Second period		13:34 – Darren Raddysh (1)
Ryan O'Reilly (2) – 19:00		Third period		No scoring
Morgan Rielly (1) – 19:15		First overtime period		No scoring
Ilya Samsonov 36 saves / 39 shots		Goalie stats		Andrei Vasilevskiy 23 saves / 27 shots

April 24	Toronto Maple Leafs	5–4	OT	Tampa Bay Lightning	Amalie Arena	Recap
No scoring		First period		09:57 – pp – Alex Killorn (1); 18:27 – Mikhail Sergachev (1)
Noel Acciari (2) – 04:51		Second period		11:31 – Steven Stamkos (1); 18:49 – Alex Killorn (2)
Auston Matthews (2) – 09:44; Auston Matthews (3) – pp – 12:29; Morgan Rielly (2) – 16:04		Third period		No scoring
Alexander Kerfoot (1) – pp – 04:14		First overtime period		No scoring
Ilya Samsonov 27 saves / 31 shots		Goalie stats		Andrei Vasilevskiy 32 saves / 37 shots

April 27	Tampa Bay Lightning	4–2	Toronto Maple Leafs	Scotiabank Arena	Recap
Anthony Cirelli (3) – 06:12		First period	05:46 – Morgan Rielly (3)
Michael Eyssimont (1) – 04:23		Second period	No scoring
Nick Paul (1) – 11:53; Alex Killorn (3) – en – 19:55		Third period	16:26 – Auston Matthews (4)
Andrei Vasilevskiy 28 saves / 30 shots		Goalie stats	Ilya Samsonov 34 saves / 37 shots

April 29	Toronto Maple Leafs	2–1	OT	Tampa Bay Lightning	Amalie Arena	Recap
No scoring		First period		No scoring
Auston Matthews (5) – 13:47		Second period		No scoring
No scoring		Third period		04:11 – Steven Stamkos (2)
John Tavares (4) – 04:36		First overtime period		No scoring
Ilya Samsonov 31 saves / 32 shots		Goalie stats		Andrei Vasilevskiy 20 saves / 22 shots

Toronto won series 4–2

==== (M1) Carolina Hurricanes vs. (WC1) New York Islanders ====
The Carolina Hurricanes finished first in the Metropolitan Division earning 113 points. New York finished as the Eastern Conference's first wild card earning 93 points. This was the second playoff meeting between these two teams. Their only previous playoff meeting was during the 2019 Eastern Conference second round, which Carolina won in a four-game sweep. Carolina won three of the four games in this year's regular-season series.

The Hurricanes defeated the Islanders in six games. Martin Necas and Brent Burns assisted on both Carolina goals in game one whose team emerged victorious for a 2–1 triumph. The Hurricanes prevented New York from achieving a two-goal comeback in game two by forcing overtime wherein Jesper Fast scored to give Carolina a 4–3 victory. With game three tied at 1–1 and it appearing to head to overtime, in a span of 2:18, the Islanders scored four times within the final four minutes and set a league record for the fastest four goals scored by one team in the playoffs to win the game 5–1. In game four, Seth Jarvis scored twice for the Hurricanes in a 5–2 victory, winning their first playoff road game since game three of the 2021 Eastern Conference second round. Ilya Sorokin made 34 saves for the Islanders in game five, forcing a sixth game with a 3–2 victory. In game six, with the game headed to overtime, Paul Stastny scored for the Hurricanes, sending Carolina to the second round with a 2–1 victory.

April 17	New York Islanders	1–2	Carolina Hurricanes	PNC Arena	Recap
No scoring		First period	03:47 – pp – Sebastian Aho (1)
Ryan Pulock (1) – 02:51		Second period	02:27 – pp – Stefan Noesen (1)
No scoring		Third period	No scoring
Ilya Sorokin 35 saves / 37 shots		Goalie stats	Antti Raanta 25 saves / 26 shots

April 19	New York Islanders	3–4	OT	Carolina Hurricanes	PNC Arena	Recap
No scoring		First period		05:49 – Paul Stastny (1)
Kyle Palmieri (1) – 10:48; Mathew Barzal (1) – 19:39		Second period		07:19 – pp – Stefan Noesen (2)
Brock Nelson (1) – 09:18		Third period		12:19 – Jaccob Slavin (1)
No scoring		First overtime period		05:03 – Jesper Fast (1)
Ilya Sorokin 32 saves / 36 shots		Goalie stats		Antti Raanta 23 saves / 26 shots

April 21	Carolina Hurricanes	1–5	New York Islanders	UBS Arena	Recap
No scoring		First period	No scoring
Jesper Fast (2) – sh – 16:56		Second period	12:49 – Casey Cizikas (1)
No scoring		Third period	16:09 – pp – Kyle Palmieri (2); 16:53 – Matt Martin (1); 18:11 – en – Scott Mayfield (1); 18:27 – Anders Lee (1)
Antti Raanta 32 saves / 36 shots		Goalie stats	Ilya Sorokin 30 saves / 31 shots

April 23	Carolina Hurricanes	5–2	New York Islanders	UBS Arena	Recap
Seth Jarvis (1) – pp – 04:05		First period	No scoring
Martin Necas (1) – pp – 01:15; Sebastian Aho (2) – 13:30		Second period	No scoring
Seth Jarvis (2) – 01:20; Mackenzie MacEachern (1) – 14:01		Third period	03:14 – Adam Pelech (1); 17:57 – sh – Bo Horvat (1)
Antti Raanta 27 saves / 29 shots		Goalie stats	Ilya Sorokin 24 saves / 29 shots

April 25	New York Islanders	3–2	Carolina Hurricanes	PNC Arena	Recap
Pierre Engvall (1) – 10:27		First period	No scoring
Brock Nelson (2) – 03:16; Mathew Barzal (2) – 18:05		Second period	13:10 – Paul Stastny (2)
No scoring		Third period	10:28 – Sebastian Aho (3)
Ilya Sorokin 34 saves / 36 shots		Goalie stats	Antti Raanta 19 saves / 22 shots

April 28	Carolina Hurricanes	2–1	OT	New York Islanders	UBS Arena	Recap
No scoring		First period		09:21 – Cal Clutterbuck (1)
No scoring		Second period		No scoring
Sebastian Aho (4) – 09:24		Third period		No scoring
Paul Stastny (3) – 06:00		First overtime period		No scoring
Frederik Andersen 33 saves / 34 shots		Goalie stats		Ilya Sorokin 39 saves / 41 shots

Carolina won series 4–2

==== (M2) New Jersey Devils vs. (M3) New York Rangers ====
The New Jersey Devils finished second in the Metropolitan Division with 112 points. The New York Rangers earned 107 points to finish third in the Metropolitan Division. This was the seventh playoff meeting between these two rivals with New York winning four of the six previous series. They last met in the 2012 Eastern Conference final, which New Jersey won in six games. New Jersey won three of the four games in this year's regular season series.

The Devils defeated the Rangers in seven games. In game one, Adam Fox assisted four times for the Rangers emerging with a 5–1 victory. Patrick Kane scored a goal and assisted on both of Chris Kreider's goals in the Rangers 5–1 game two victory. In game three, the Devils made a goaltender change and started rookie Akira Schmid, who made 35 saves en route to a 2–1 overtime victory, in which Dougie Hamilton scored the game-winning goal. In game four, Jonas Siegenthaler scored a goal and provided an assist for the Devils for a 3–1 win to tie the series 2–2. In game five, Erik Haula scored twice and notched an assist while Schmid stopped all 23 shots he faced for the Devils, defeating the Rangers 4–0 for a 3–2 series lead. Kreider scored a goal and provided two assists for the Rangers in game six, defeating the Devils 5–2 to force a seventh game. In game seven, Schmid stopped all 31 shots he faced in a 4–0 victory to send the Devils to the second round.

April 18	New York Rangers	5–1	New Jersey Devils	Prudential Center	Recap
Vladimir Tarasenko (1) – 04:58; Chris Kreider (1) – pp – 09:30		First period	No scoring
Ryan Lindgren (1) – 16:57		Second period	No scoring
Chris Kreider (2) – pp – 11:07; Filip Chytil (1) – en – 18:02		Third period	17:14 – ps – Jack Hughes (1)
Igor Shesterkin 27 saves / 28 shots		Goalie stats	Vitek Vanecek 18 saves / 22 shots

April 20	New York Rangers	5–1	New Jersey Devils	Prudential Center	Recap
No scoring		First period	11:44 – pp – Erik Haula (1)
Vladimir Tarasenko (2) – 05:53; Chris Kreider (3) – pp – 09:57; Chris Kreider (4) – pp – 16:00		Second period	No scoring
Patrick Kane (1) – 06:34; Kaapo Kakko (1) – 13:05		Third period	No scoring
Igor Shesterkin 23 saves / 24 shots		Goalie stats	Vitek Vanecek 25 saves / 30 shots

April 22	New Jersey Devils	2–1	OT	New York Rangers	Madison Square Garden	Recap
No scoring		First period		No scoring
Jack Hughes (2) – pp – 10:37		Second period		03:39 – Chris Kreider (5)
No scoring		Third period		No scoring
Dougie Hamilton (1) – 11:36		First overtime period		No scoring
Akira Schmid 35 saves / 36 shots		Goalie stats		Igor Shesterkin 26 saves / 28 shots

April 24	New Jersey Devils	3–1	New York Rangers	Madison Square Garden	Recap
Jack Hughes (3) – 02:50		First period	No scoring
No scoring		Second period	No scoring
Jonas Siegenthaler (1) – 08:22; Ondrej Palat (1) – en – 19:34		Third period	01:42 – Vincent Trocheck (1)
Akira Schmid 22 saves / 23 shots		Goalie stats	Igor Shesterkin 20 saves / 22 shots

April 27	New York Rangers	0–4	New Jersey Devils	Prudential Center	Recap
No scoring		First period	00:39 – Ondrej Palat (2)
No scoring		Second period	03:27 – pp – Erik Haula (2); 13:32 – sh – Dawson Mercer (1)
No scoring		Third period	14:48 – en – Erik Haula (3)
Igor Shesterkin 39 saves / 42 shots		Goalie stats	Akira Schmid 23 saves / 23 shots

April 29	New Jersey Devils	2–5	New York Rangers	Madison Square Garden	Recap
Curtis Lazar (1) – 11:49		First period	19:35 – pp – Chris Kreider (6)
No scoring		Second period	10:10 – Mika Zibanejad (1); 18:25 – Vladimir Tarasenko (3)
Dawson Mercer (2) – pp – 15:12		Third period	07:23 – Barclay Goodrow (1); 12:28 – Braden Schneider (1)
Akira Schmid 24 saves / 29 shots Vitek Vanecek 0 saves / 0 shots		Goalie stats	Igor Shesterkin 34 saves / 36 shots

May 1	New York Rangers	0–4	New Jersey Devils	Prudential Center	Recap
No scoring		First period	No scoring
No scoring		Second period	09:53 – sh – Michael McLeod (1); 15:39 – Tomas Tatar (1)
No scoring		Third period	14:27 – Erik Haula (4); 16:41 – en – Jesper Bratt (1)
Igor Shesterkin 20 saves / 23 shots		Goalie stats	Akira Schmid 31 saves / 31 shots

New Jersey won series 4–3

=== Western Conference first round ===
==== (C1) Colorado Avalanche vs. (WC1) Seattle Kraken ====
The Colorado Avalanche finished first in the Central Division, earning 109 points. The Seattle Kraken earned 100 points to finish as the Western Conference's first wild card for their first playoff appearance. This was the first playoff meeting between these two teams. This series also marked the first appearance of a team representing Seattle in the Stanley Cup playoffs in ninety-nine years. The most recent team to represent Seattle before this was the Seattle Metropolitans who lost the PCHA Final in 1924. Seattle won two of the three games in this year's regular season series.

The Kraken defeated the Avalanche in seven games. Goaltender Philipp Grubauer made 34 saves in game one for the Kraken, defeating Colorado 3–1 for the city of Seattle's first playoff victory since game four of the 1920 Stanley Cup Final. In game two, the Avalanche overcame a two-goal deficit, spearheaded by Devon Toews third period goal, to win 3–2. Nathan MacKinnon and Mikko Rantanen both scored twice for the Avalanche in game three, defeating the Kraken 6–4. In game four, with the game tied 2–2 after three periods, the Kraken's Jordan Eberle scored in the overtime period to give Seattle a 3–2 victory with a series tied 2–2. Grubauer made 26 saves for the Kraken in game five, who took a 3–2 series lead with a 3–2 victory. In game six, Artturi Lehkonen scored twice and Toews assisted thrice for Colorado, forcing a seventh game with a 4–1 victory. Game seven saw Oliver Bjorkstrand score twice for Seattle, and coupled with Grubauer's 33-save performance to hold a 2–1 lead, the Kraken advanced to the second round, becoming the first expansion team to triumph over the defending Stanley Cup champions in their inaugural playoff series.

April 18	Seattle Kraken	3–1	Colorado Avalanche	Ball Arena	Recap
Eeli Tolvanen (1) – 03:26		First period	12:35 – Mikko Rantanen (1)
Alexander Wennberg (1) – 01:20		Second period	No scoring
Morgan Geekie (1) – 04:03		Third period	No scoring
Philipp Grubauer 34 saves / 35 shots		Goalie stats	Alexandar Georgiev 27 saves / 30 shots

April 20	Seattle Kraken	2–3	Colorado Avalanche	Ball Arena	Recap
Justin Schultz (1) – 02:40; Brandon Tanev (1) – sh – 13:27		First period	No scoring
No scoring		Second period	06:42 – Artturi Lehkonen (1); 07:30 – Valeri Nichushkin (1)
No scoring		Third period	12:59 – Devon Toews (1)
Philipp Grubauer 38 saves / 41 shots		Goalie stats	Alexandar Georgiev 27 saves / 29 shots

April 22	Colorado Avalanche	6–4	Seattle Kraken	Climate Pledge Arena	Recap
J. T. Compher (1) – sh – 16:07; Nathan MacKinnon (1) – 19:15		First period	06:08 – Jaden Schwartz (1)
Cale Makar (1) – 04:33		Second period	12:51 – Jamie Oleksiak (1); 13:10 – Matty Beniers (1)
Mikko Rantanen (2) – 03:01; Nathan MacKinnon (2) – 04:29; Mikko Rantanen (3) – en – 17:46		Third period	19:20 – pp – Jaden Schwartz (2)
Alexandar Georgiev 25 saves / 29 shots		Goalie stats	Philipp Grubauer 28 saves / 33 shots

April 24	Colorado Avalanche	2–3	OT	Seattle Kraken	Climate Pledge Arena	Recap
No scoring		First period		03:56 – Will Borgen (1); 10:09 – pp – Daniel Sprong (1)
Mikko Rantanen (4) – 14:08; Mikko Rantanen (5) – pp – 19:10		Second period		No scoring
No scoring		Third period		No scoring
No scoring		First overtime period		03:00 – pp – Jordan Eberle (1)
Alexandar Georgiev 40 saves / 43 shots		Goalie stats		Philipp Grubauer 20 saves / 22 shots

April 26	Seattle Kraken	3–2	Colorado Avalanche	Ball Arena	Recap
No scoring		First period	No scoring
Morgan Geekie (2) – 06:35; Tye Kartye (1) – 09:59		Second period	07:55 – Nathan MacKinnon (3)
Yanni Gourde (1) – 01:40		Third period	16:23 – Evan Rodrigues (1)
Philipp Grubauer 26 saves / 28 shots		Goalie stats	Alexandar Georgiev 26 saves / 29 shots

April 28	Colorado Avalanche	4–1	Seattle Kraken	Climate Pledge Arena	Recap
Mikko Rantanen (6) – 19:40		First period	15:48 – Vince Dunn (1)
Erik Johnson (1) – 07:21; Artturi Lehkonen (2) – 16:57		Second period	No scoring
Artturi Lehkonen (3) – en – 19:48		Third period	No scoring
Alexandar Georgiev 22 saves / 23 shots		Goalie stats	Philipp Grubauer 35 saves / 38 shots

April 30	Seattle Kraken	2–1	Colorado Avalanche	Ball Arena	Recap
No scoring		First period	No scoring
Oliver Bjorkstrand (1) – 03:24; Oliver Bjorkstrand (2) – 07:22		Second period	19:32 – pp – Mikko Rantanen (7)
No scoring		Third period	No scoring
Philipp Grubauer 33 saves / 34 shots		Goalie stats	Alexandar Georgiev 25 saves / 27 shots

Seattle won series 4–3

==== (C2) Dallas Stars vs. (C3) Minnesota Wild ====
The Dallas Stars finished with 108 points to finish second in the Central Division. The Minnesota Wild earned 103 points to finish third in the Central Division. This was the second playoff meeting between these two teams. Their only previous playoff meeting was in the 2016 Western Conference first round, which Dallas won in six games. These teams split their four-game regular season series.

The Stars defeated the Wild in six games. In game one, both teams remained tied after three periods and an overtime period; however, at 12:20 of the second overtime, the Wild's Ryan Hartman scored to give Minnesota a 3–2 victory. Forward Roope Hintz scored a hat trick and defenceman Miro Heiskanen provided four assists for the Stars in game two, defeating the Wild 7–3 to tie the series 1–1. In game three, Mats Zuccarello scored twice and Hartman scored a goal and provided two assists for Minnesota, defeating Dallas 5–1. Hintz assisted thrice and goaltender Jake Oettinger made 32 saves for the Stars, tying the series 2–2 with a 3–2 victory. In game five, Oettinger shut out the Wild stopping all 27 shots in a 4–0 victory to give Dallas a 3–2 series lead. Max Domi and Mason Marchment both scored a goal and provided an assist in game six, moving onto the second round with a 4–1 victory.

April 17	Minnesota Wild	3–2	2OT	Dallas Stars	American Airlines Center	Recap
Kirill Kaprizov (1) – pp – 19:12		First period		No scoring
Sam Steel (1) – 14:25		Second period		02:08 – pp – Roope Hintz (1); 04:13 – pp – Jason Robertson (1)
No scoring		Third period		No scoring
Ryan Hartman (1) – 12:20		Second overtime period		No scoring
Filip Gustavsson 51 saves / 53 shots		Goalie stats		Jake Oettinger 45 saves / 48 shots

April 19	Minnesota Wild	3–7	Dallas Stars	American Airlines Center	Recap
Oskar Sundqvist (1) – 16:11		First period	04:14 – sh – Roope Hintz (2); 11:20 – pp – Tyler Seguin (1)
Marcus Johansson (1) – pp – 11:54; Frederick Gaudreau (1) – 12:05		Second period	04:07 – pp – Jamie Benn (1); 05:34 – Evgenii Dadonov (1); 16:08 – Evgenii Dadonov (2); 16:56 – Roope Hintz (3)
No scoring		Third period	12:16 – pp – Roope Hintz (4)
Marc-Andre Fleury 24 saves / 31 shots		Goalie stats	Jake Oettinger 23 saves / 26 shots

April 21	Dallas Stars	1–5	Minnesota Wild	Xcel Energy Center	Recap
No scoring		First period	16:45 – Mats Zuccarello (1)
Luke Glendening (1) – 02:25		Second period	02:14 – Marcus Johansson (2); 11:24 – pp – Marcus Foligno (1)
No scoring		Third period	14:07 – Mats Zuccarello (2); 18:10 – en – Ryan Hartman (2)
Jake Oettinger 20 saves / 24 shots		Goalie stats	Filip Gustavsson 23 saves / 24 shots

April 23	Dallas Stars	3–2	Minnesota Wild	Xcel Energy Center	Recap
No scoring		First period	No scoring
Tyler Seguin (2) – pp – 15:42		Second period	No scoring
Evgenii Dadonov (3) – 03:05; Tyler Seguin (3) – pp – 16:29		Third period	05:58 – John Klingberg (1); 18:40 – pp – Frederick Gaudreau (2)
Jake Oettinger 32 saves / 34 shots		Goalie stats	Filip Gustavsson 21 saves / 24 shots

April 25	Minnesota Wild	0–4	Dallas Stars	American Airlines Center	Recap
No scoring		First period	02:22 – pp – Tyler Seguin (4); 11:04 – pp – Jason Robertson (2)
No scoring		Second period	01:19 – Mason Marchment (1)
No scoring		Third period	16:03 – en – Ty Dellandrea (1)
Filip Gustavsson 21 saves / 24 shots		Goalie stats	Jake Oettinger 27 saves / 27 shots

April 28	Dallas Stars	4–1	Minnesota Wild	Xcel Energy Center	Recap
Roope Hintz (5) – 06:22		First period	No scoring
Wyatt Johnston (1) – 13:37; Mason Marchment (2) – 19:59		Second period	No scoring
Max Domi (1) – en – 19:03		Third period	12:53 – Frederick Gaudreau (3)
Jake Oettinger 23 saves / 24 shots		Goalie stats	Filip Gustavsson 23 saves / 26 shots Marc-Andre Fleury 6 saves / 6 shots

Dallas won series 4–2

==== (P1) Vegas Golden Knights vs. (WC2) Winnipeg Jets ====
The Vegas Golden Knights finished first in the Pacific Division and Western Conference earning 111 points. The Winnipeg Jets earned 95 points to finish as the Western Conference's second wild card. This was the second playoff meeting between these two teams. Their only previous meeting was in the 2018 Western Conference final, which Vegas won in five games. Vegas won all three games in this year's regular season series.

The Golden Knights defeated the Jets in five games. In game one, Blake Wheeler scored a goal and provided two assists for the Jets in their 5–1 victory. Mark Stone provided two goals and an assist for Vegas in game two, tying the series 1–1 in a 5–2 victory. The Golden Knights prevented the Jets from overtaking a three-goal lead in game three with Michael Amadio scoring in double overtime to win 5–4. In game four, Brett Howden scored twice for the Golden Knights to defeat the Jets 4–2 and take a 3–1 series lead. Chandler Stephenson scored twice for the Golden Knights in game five, sending Vegas to the second round with a 4–1 victory.

April 18	Winnipeg Jets	5–1	Vegas Golden Knights	T-Mobile Arena	Recap
No scoring		First period	No scoring
Kyle Connor (1) – 01:24; Pierre-Luc Dubois (1) – 02:26		Second period	15:49 – William Karlsson (1)
Blake Wheeler (1) – 03:53; Adam Lowry (1) – en – 18:39; Adam Lowry (2) – pp – 19:41		Third period	No scoring
Connor Hellebuyck 16 saves / 17 shots		Goalie stats	Laurent Brossoit 26 saves / 30 shots

April 20	Winnipeg Jets	2–5	Vegas Golden Knights	T-Mobile Arena	Recap
Adam Lowry (3) – pp – 09:18		First period	No scoring
Kevin Stenlund (1) – 16:01		Second period	05:54 – William Karlsson (2); 10:25 – Jack Eichel (1)
No scoring		Third period	05:37 – Chandler Stephenson (1); 13:01 – Mark Stone (1); 17:30 – Mark Stone (2)
Connor Hellebuyck 34 saves / 39 shots		Goalie stats	Laurent Brossoit 31 saves / 33 shots

April 22	Vegas Golden Knights	5–4	2OT	Winnipeg Jets	Canada Life Centre	Recap
Chandler Stephenson (2) – 02:52; Jack Eichel (2) – pp – 06:18		First period		09:07 – Kyle Connor (2)
Jack Eichel (3) – pp – 10:46; Keegan Kolesar (1) – 17:45		Second period		No scoring
No scoring		Third period		02:04 – Nino Niederreiter (1); 14:08 – pp – Mark Scheifele (1); 19:38 – Adam Lowry (4)
Michael Amadio (1) – 03:40		Second overtime period		No scoring
Laurent Brossoit 30 saves / 34 shots		Goalie stats		Connor Hellebuyck 43 saves / 48 shots

April 24	Vegas Golden Knights	4–2	Winnipeg Jets	Canada Life Centre	Recap
Brett Howden (1) – 09:53		First period	05:53 – pp – Blake Wheeler (2)
William Karlsson (3) – 13:32; Ivan Barbashev (1) – 14:19		Second period	No scoring
Brett Howden (2) – en – 19:43		Third period	02:57 – pp – Pierre-Luc Dubois (2)
Laurent Brossoit 24 saves / 26 shots		Goalie stats	Connor Hellebuyck 26 saves / 29 shots

April 27	Winnipeg Jets	1–4	Vegas Golden Knights	T-Mobile Arena	Recap
No scoring		First period	00:50 – Chandler Stephenson (3)
No scoring		Second period	00:42 – Mark Stone (3); 04:41 – William Karlsson (4); 08:37 – pp – Chandler Stephenson (4)
Kyle Connor (3) – 14:22		Third period	No scoring
Connor Hellebuyck 21 saves / 25 shots		Goalie stats	Laurent Brossoit 29 saves / 30 shots

Vegas won series 4–1

==== (P2) Edmonton Oilers vs. (P3) Los Angeles Kings ====
The Edmonton Oilers finished second in the Pacific Division with 109 points. The Los Angeles Kings earned 104 points to finish third in the Pacific Division. This was the second consecutive playoff meeting and ninth playoff meeting overall between these two rivals with Edmonton winning six of the eight previous series. Edmonton won the previous year's Western Conference first-round series in seven games. These teams split their four-game regular-season series.

The Oilers defeated the Kings in six games. Los Angeles came back from a two-goal deficit in game one, and, assisted by captain Anze Kopitar's goal and three assists, the Kings won 4–3 in overtime by forward Alex Iafallo's goal. Although the Kings tied game two after being down by two goals, Edmonton forward Klim Kostin's goal at 2:20 of the third period proved to be the game-winner for the Oilers in a 4–2 affair. In game three, the game again headed to overtime where Trevor Moore scored for the Kings to win 3–2. The Oilers came back from a three-goal deficit and a one-goal deficit in game four to force overtime then Zach Hyman scored to give Edmonton the 5–4 victory and a series tied 2–2. In game five, the Oilers forced Kings goaltender Joonas Korpisalo to be pulled after tallying four goals on nineteen shots, wrapping in a 6–3 victory to take a 3–2 series lead. Kailer Yamamoto sealed the Oilers' victory late in game six, scoring with 3:03 left in the third period to win 5–4 and advance to the second round.

April 17	Los Angeles Kings	4–3	OT	Edmonton Oilers	Rogers Place	Recap
No scoring		First period		06:57 – Leon Draisaitl (1); 12:31 – pp – Evan Bouchard (1)
No scoring		Second period		No scoring
Adrian Kempe (1) – 00:52; Adrian Kempe (2) – 11:23; Anze Kopitar (1) – pp – 19:43		Third period		08:46 – Leon Draisaitl (2)
Alex Iafallo (1) – pp – 09:19		First overtime period		No scoring
Joonas Korpisalo 37 saves / 40 shots		Goalie stats		Stuart Skinner 31 saves / 35 shots

April 19	Los Angeles Kings	2–4	Edmonton Oilers	Rogers Place	Recap
No scoring		First period	02:34 – Derek Ryan (1); 12:06 – pp – Leon Draisaitl (3)
Phillip Danault (1) – 14:38; Gabriel Vilardi (1) – 19:16		Second period	No scoring
No scoring		Third period	02:20 – Klim Kostin (1); 19:37 – en – Evander Kane (1)
Joonas Korpisalo 33 saves / 36 shots		Goalie stats	Stuart Skinner 22 saves / 24 shots

April 21	Edmonton Oilers	2–3	OT	Los Angeles Kings	Crypto.com Arena	Recap
No scoring		First period		19:27 – Alex Iafallo (2)
Connor McDavid (1) – pp – 07:42; Connor McDavid (2) – pp – 09:22		Second period		09:40 – pp – Adrian Kempe (3)
No scoring		Third period		No scoring
No scoring		First overtime period		03:24 – pp – Trevor Moore (1)
Stuart Skinner 28 saves / 31 shots		Goalie stats		Joonas Korpisalo 38 saves / 40 shots

April 23	Edmonton Oilers	5–4	OT	Los Angeles Kings	Crypto.com Arena	Recap
No scoring		First period		09:25 – Gabriel Vilardi (2); 16:48 – Viktor Arvidsson (1); 18:11 – pp – Anze Kopitar (2)
Evan Bouchard (2) – pp – 04:55; Leon Draisaitl (4) – 09:41; Leon Draisaitl (5) – pp – 19:49		Second period		No scoring
Evander Kane (2) – 16:58		Third period		04:28 – Matt Roy (1)
Zach Hyman (1) – 10:39		First overtime period		No scoring
Stuart Skinner 8 saves / 11 shots Jack Campbell 27 saves / 28 shots		Goalie stats		Joonas Korpisalo 37 saves / 42 shots

April 25	Los Angeles Kings	3–6	Edmonton Oilers	Rogers Place	Recap
Alex Iafallo (3) – 13:12; Adrian Kempe (4) – 17:35		First period	08:08 – pp – Evander Kane (3); 10:40 – Leon Draisaitl (6); 14:12 – Brett Kulak (1)
No scoring		Second period	11:49 – Nick Bjugstad (1); 15:47 – pp – Zach Hyman (2)
Quinton Byfield (1) – 06:33		Third period	04:26 – Nick Bjugstad (2)
Joonas Korpisalo 15 saves / 19 shots Pheonix Copley 6 saves / 8 shots		Goalie stats	Stuart Skinner 25 saves / 28 shots

April 29	Edmonton Oilers	5–4	Los Angeles Kings	Crypto.com Arena	Recap
Connor McDavid (3) – 01:25; Klim Kostin (2) – 12:12		First period	08:13 – Sean Durzi (1)
Leon Draisaitl (7) – pp – 04:06; Klim Kostin (3) – 10:54		Second period	06:36 – pp – Adrian Kempe (5); 08:16 – pp – Kevin Fiala (1)
Kailer Yamamoto (1) – 16:57		Third period	07:46 – sh – Phillip Danault (2)
Stuart Skinner 40 saves / 44 shots		Goalie stats	Joonas Korpisalo 21 saves / 26 shots

Edmonton won series 4–2

== Second round ==
=== Eastern Conference second round ===
==== (A2) Toronto Maple Leafs vs. (WC2) Florida Panthers ====
This was the first playoff meeting between these two teams. Toronto won three of the four games in this year's regular season series.

The Panthers defeated the Maple Leafs in five games. Matthew Tkachuk had three assists for the Panthers in game one, defeating the Maple Leafs 4–2. In game two, the Panthers overcame a two-goal deficit and with Sergei Bobrovsky's 35 saves, Florida won 3–2. Game three was originally scheduled for Saturday, May 6; however, due to scheduling conflicts with the Miami Heat and the 2023 Miami Grand Prix, the game was rescheduled to Sunday, May 7. The Panthers emerged victorious in this game, winning 3–2 via Sam Reinhart's overtime goal, taking a 3–0 series lead in the process. In game four, the Maple Leafs staved off elimination on the back of Mitch Marner's goal and assist in a 2–1 victory to force a fifth game. With game five tied 2–2 after three periods, the Panthers' Nick Cousins scored in overtime to advance Florida to the Eastern Conference final for the first time in twenty-seven years.

May 2	Florida Panthers	4–2	Toronto Maple Leafs	Scotiabank Arena	Recap
Nick Cousins (1) – 09:25		First period	No scoring
Sam Bennett (4) – 07:58; Carter Verhaeghe (3) – 17:47		Second period	08:09 – Matthew Knies (1); 14:51 – Michael Bunting (1)
Brandon Montour (6) – 12:24		Third period	No scoring
Sergei Bobrovsky 34 saves / 36 shots		Goalie stats	Ilya Samsonov 24 saves / 28 shots

May 4	Florida Panthers	3–2	Toronto Maple Leafs	Scotiabank Arena	Recap
Anton Lundell (1) – 11:13		First period	02:20 – Alexander Kerfoot (2); 05:10 – pp – Ryan O'Reilly (3)
Aleksander Barkov (2) – 00:19; Gustav Forsling (2) – 01:06		Second period	No scoring
No scoring		Third period	No scoring
Sergei Bobrovsky 35 saves / 37 shots		Goalie stats	Ilya Samsonov 26 saves / 29 shots

May 7	Toronto Maple Leafs	2–3	OT	Florida Panthers	FLA Live Arena	Recap
Sam Lafferty (1) – 02:26		First period		No scoring
Erik Gustafsson (1) – 07:32		Second period		02:36 – pp – Anthony Duclair (2); 12:28 – Carter Verhaeghe (4)
No scoring		Third period		No scoring
No scoring		First overtime period		03:02 – Sam Reinhart (5)
Ilya Samsonov 8 saves / 8 shots Joseph Woll 18 saves / 21 shots		Goalie stats		Sergei Bobrovsky 22 saves / 24 shots

May 10	Toronto Maple Leafs	2–1	Florida Panthers	FLA Live Arena	Recap
No scoring		First period	No scoring
William Nylander (3) – pp – 03:29		Second period	No scoring
Mitch Marner (3) – 10:03		Third period	12:13 – pp – Sam Reinhart (6)
Joseph Woll 24 saves / 25 shots		Goalie stats	Sergei Bobrovsky 23 saves / 25 shots

May 12	Florida Panthers	3–2	OT	Toronto Maple Leafs	Scotiabank Arena	Recap
Aaron Ekblad (1) – pp – 03:31; Carter Verhaeghe (5) – 16:18		First period		No scoring
No scoring		Second period		07:50 – Morgan Rielly (4)
No scoring		Third period		15:33 – William Nylander (4)
Nick Cousins (2) – 15:32		First overtime period		No scoring
Sergei Bobrovsky 50 saves / 52 shots		Goalie stats		Joseph Woll 40 saves / 43 shots

Florida won series 4–1

==== (M1) Carolina Hurricanes vs. (M2) New Jersey Devils ====
This was the fifth playoff meeting between these two teams with Carolina winning three of the four previous series. They last met in the 2009 Eastern Conference quarterfinals, which Carolina won in seven games. These teams split the four games in this year's regular season series.

The Hurricanes defeated the Devils in five games. In game one, Jordan Martinook and Jordan Staal assisted twice in the Hurricanes' 5–1 victory. Frederik Andersen made 28 saves in game two, and with Jesperi Kotkaniemi's two goals, Carolina defeated New Jersey 6–1. Jack Hughes had two goals and assists in game three, granting the Devils the victory in an 8–4 affair. In game four, the Hurricanes capitalized on a five-goal second period, routing out the Devils 6–1 for a 3–1 series lead. Andersen made 27 saves in game five for the Hurricanes and with an overtime goal by Jesper Fast, Carolina advanced to the Eastern Conference final with a 3–2 victory.

May 3	New Jersey Devils	1–5	Carolina Hurricanes	PNC Arena	Recap
No scoring		First period	09:41 – Brett Pesce (1); 14:43 – Seth Jarvis (3)
Nathan Bastian (1) – 05:02		Second period	01:55 – Jesperi Kotkaniemi (1)
No scoring		Third period	10:17 – Brady Skjei (1); 16:44 – en – Jesper Fast (3)
Akira Schmid 8 saves / 11 shots Vitek Vanecek 10 saves / 11 shots		Goalie stats	Frederik Andersen 17 saves / 18 shots

May 5	New Jersey Devils	1–6	Carolina Hurricanes	PNC Arena	Recap
No scoring		First period	No scoring
No scoring		Second period	01:35 – pp – Jesperi Kotkaniemi (2); 03:58 – Jesperi Kotkaniemi (3); 17:25 – Jordan Staal (1); 19:44 – Martin Necas (2)
Miles Wood (1) – 03:49		Third period	12:48 – Jordan Martinook (1); 13:42 – Stefan Noesen (3)
Akira Schmid 21 saves / 25 shots Vitek Vanecek 8 saves / 10 shots		Goalie stats	Frederik Andersen 28 saves / 29 shots

May 7	Carolina Hurricanes	4–8	New Jersey Devils	Prudential Center	Recap
No scoring		First period	05:58 – Timo Meier (1); 10:55 – Jack Hughes (4); 12:31 – sh – Michael McLeod (2)
Sebastian Aho (5) – 02:00; Jordan Martinook (2) – sh-ps – 12:18		Second period	00:53 – Nico Hischier (1); 05:33 – Damon Severson (1)
Jordan Staal (2) – sh – 07:21; Seth Jarvis (4) – sh – 08:11		Third period	03:08 – Miles Wood (2); 05:17 – Jack Hughes (5); 10:47 – pp – Ondrej Palat (3)
Frederik Andersen 8 saves / 12 shots Pyotr Kochetkov 18 saves / 22 shots		Goalie stats	Vitek Vanecek 26 saves / 30 shots

May 9	Carolina Hurricanes	6–1	New Jersey Devils	Prudential Center	Recap
Martin Necas (3) – 17:40		First period	01:55 – Jack Hughes (6)
Martin Necas (4) – 07:26; Brett Pesce (2) – 09:51; Jesper Fast (4) – 11:07; Brent Burns (1) – 12:46; Jordan Martinook (3) – 19:36		Second period	No scoring
No scoring		Third period	No scoring
Frederik Andersen 21 saves / 22 shots		Goalie stats	Vitek Vanecek 12 saves / 17 shots Akira Schmid 11 saves / 12 shots

May 11	New Jersey Devils	2–3	OT	Carolina Hurricanes	PNC Arena	Recap
Dawson Mercer (3) – 15:06		First period		No scoring
Timo Meier (2) – pp – 07:15		Second period		00:50 – Jaccob Slavin (2); 19:22 – Brent Burns (2)
No scoring		Third period		No scoring
No scoring		First overtime period		07:09 – pp – Jesper Fast (5)
Akira Schmid 36 saves / 39 shots		Goalie stats		Frederik Andersen 27 saves / 29 shots

Carolina won series 4–1

=== Western Conference second round ===
==== (C2) Dallas Stars vs. (WC1) Seattle Kraken ====
This was the first playoff meeting between these two teams. Dallas won two of the three games in this year's regular season series.

The Stars defeated the Kraken in seven games. Although Joe Pavelski scored four goals in game one for the Stars, Yanni Gourde's overtime goal for the Kraken provided Seattle a 5–4 victory. Wyatt Johnston and Tyler Seguin each provided a goal and an assist in Dallas' game two victory, outscoring Seattle 4–2. Seven different Kraken players scored in game three, routing the Stars 7–2 to take a 2–1 series lead. Max Domi scored twice for Dallas in game four, outscoring Seattle 6–3 to even the series 2–2. In game five, Roope Hintz provided an assist and scored twice for Dallas, giving the Stars a 5–2 victory and a 3–2 series lead. Eeli Tolvanen scored a goal and had two assists while Jordan Eberle scored twice and provided an assist for the Kraken in game six, sending the series to a seventh game with a 6–3 victory. In game seven, Hintz and Johnston each provided a goal and an assist for the Stars, sending Dallas to the conference finals with a 2–1 victory.

May 2	Seattle Kraken	5–4	OT	Dallas Stars	American Airlines Center	Recap
Jaden Schwartz (3) – 11:25; Justin Schultz (2) – 14:28; Oliver Bjorkstrand (3) – 14:39; Jordan Eberle (2) – 15:20		First period		02:25 – Joe Pavelski (1); 12:18 – Joe Pavelski (2)
No scoring		Second period		No scoring
No scoring		Third period		09:50 – Joe Pavelski (3); 13:23 – Joe Pavelski (4)
Yanni Gourde (2) – 12:17		First overtime period		No scoring
Philipp Grubauer 31 saves / 35 shots		Goalie stats		Jake Oettinger 39 saves / 44 shots

May 4	Seattle Kraken	2–4	Dallas Stars	American Airlines Center	Recap
No scoring		First period	No scoring
Tye Kartye (2) – 11:05		Second period	03:43 – Wyatt Johnston (2); 09:05 – Evgenii Dadonov (4); 16:57 – pp – Joe Pavelski (5)
Jordan Eberle (3) – 16:32		Third period	10:59 – Tyler Seguin (5)
Philipp Grubauer 33 saves / 37 shots		Goalie stats	Jake Oettinger 25 saves / 27 shots

May 7	Dallas Stars	2–7	Seattle Kraken	Climate Pledge Arena	Recap
No scoring		First period	No scoring
Mason Marchment (3) – 12:40		Second period	02:10 – Jordan Eberle (4); 03:36 – Alexander Wennberg (2); 06:30 – Carson Soucy (1); 08:22 – Matty Beniers (2); 19:21 – Eeli Tolvanen (2)
Jani Hakanpaa (1) – 07:00		Third period	01:49 – sh – Yanni Gourde (3); 17:30 – pp – Justin Schultz (3)
Jake Oettinger 12 saves / 17 shots Scott Wedgewood 6 saves / 8 shots		Goalie stats	Philipp Grubauer 24 saves / 26 shots

May 9	Dallas Stars	6–3	Seattle Kraken	Climate Pledge Arena	Recap
Jamie Benn (2) – pp – 17:13		First period	No scoring
Thomas Harley (1) – 04:46; Max Domi (2) – 09:25; Joe Pavelski (6) – pp – 10:50; Roope Hintz (6) – 19:07		Second period	11:46 – Jaden Schwartz (4)
Max Domi (3) – en – 17:39		Third period	03:24 – Jaden Schwartz (5); 15:49 – Adam Larsson (1)
Jake Oettinger 16 saves / 19 shots		Goalie stats	Philipp Grubauer 17 saves / 22 shots Martin Jones 2 saves / 2 shots

May 11	Seattle Kraken	2–5	Dallas Stars	American Airlines Center	Recap
No scoring		First period	03:57 – Wyatt Johnston (3); 05:35 – Roope Hintz (7)
Adam Larsson (2) – 01:59; Jared McCann (1) – 07:30		Second period	00:35 – Joe Pavelski (7)
No scoring		Third period	11:20 – Roope Hintz (8); 16:43 – en – Radek Faksa (1)
Philipp Grubauer 16 saves / 20 shots		Goalie stats	Jake Oettinger 29 saves / 31 shots

May 13	Dallas Stars	3–6	Seattle Kraken	Climate Pledge Arena	Recap
Mason Marchment (4) – 09:30		First period	08:59 – Yanni Gourde (4); 16:46 – pp – Jordan Eberle (5)
Joe Pavelski (8) – pp – 05:37		Second period	01:34 – Eeli Tolvanen (3); 04:23 – Tye Kartye (3)
Joel Kiviranta (1) – 08:58		Third period	08:43 – Matty Beniers (3); 19:02 – en – Jordan Eberle (6)
Jake Oettinger 14 saves / 18 shots Scott Wedgewood 9 saves / 10 shots		Goalie stats	Philipp Grubauer 20 saves / 23 shots

May 15	Seattle Kraken	1–2	Dallas Stars	American Airlines Center	Recap
No scoring		First period	No scoring
No scoring		Second period	15:59 – Roope Hintz (9)
Oliver Bjorkstrand (4) – 19:41		Third period	12:48 – Wyatt Johnston (4)
Philipp Grubauer 26 saves / 28 shots		Goalie stats	Jake Oettinger 22 saves / 23 shots

Dallas won series 4–3

==== (P1) Vegas Golden Knights vs. (P2) Edmonton Oilers ====
This was the first playoff meeting between these two teams. Edmonton won three of the four games in this year's regular season series.

The Golden Knights defeated the Oilers in six games. In game one, Leon Draisaitl scored four goals for Edmonton; however, the Golden Knights, led in part by Ivan Barbashev's two goals, defeated the Oilers 6–4. Game two was originally scheduled for Friday, May 5; however, with game three of the Maple Leafs-Panthers series rescheduled to Sunday, May 7, a void was left in the Hockey Night in Canada timeslot, thus game two was moved to Saturday, May 6 to the dismay of Oilers fans. Draisaitl continued his scoring into game two, providing two goals for the Oilers and this time defeating the Golden Knights 5–1. In game three, Jonathan Marchessault scored twice and Jack Eichel provided a goal and two assists for the Golden Knights to win 5–1. Connor McDavid assisted twice and Ryan Nugent-Hopkins scored a goal and provided an assist for the Oilers in game four, tying the series 2–2 with a 4–1 victory. The Golden Knights won game five on a score of 4–3, thus taking a 3–2 series lead. In game six, Jonathan Marchessault scored a natural hat trick in the second period, giving the Golden Knights a 5–2 victory and a fourth advancement to the conference finals/Stanley Cup semifinals.

May 3	Edmonton Oilers	4–6	Vegas Golden Knights	T-Mobile Arena	Recap
Leon Draisaitl (8) – pp – 03:56; Leon Draisaitl (9) – 19:49		First period	04:36 – Ivan Barbashev (2); 09:54 – Michael Amadio (2); 18:23 – pp – Mark Stone (4)
No scoring		Second period	No scoring
Leon Draisaitl (10) – pp – 01:35; Leon Draisaitl (11) – 08:33		Third period	02:36 – Ivan Barbashev (3); 03:26 – Chandler Stephenson (5); 19:26 – pp-en – Jack Eichel (4)
Stuart Skinner 28 saves / 33 shots		Goalie stats	Laurent Brossoit 23 saves / 27 shots

May 6	Edmonton Oilers	5–1	Vegas Golden Knights	T-Mobile Arena	Recap
Leon Draisaitl (12) – pp – 02:21; Evan Bouchard (3) – pp – 07:01; Connor McDavid (4) – sh – 11:11; Leon Draisaitl (13) – 16:17		First period	No scoring
Connor McDavid (5) – pp – 11:43		Second period	No scoring
No scoring		Third period	01:36 – Ivan Barbashev (4)
Stuart Skinner 30 saves / 31 shots		Goalie stats	Laurent Brossoit 27 saves / 32 shots Adin Hill 4 saves / 4 shots

May 8	Vegas Golden Knights	5–1	Edmonton Oilers	Rogers Place	Recap
Jonathan Marchessault (1) – 04:44; Jonathan Marchessault (2) – 19:09		First period	02:45 – Warren Foegele (1)
Zach Whitecloud (1) – 07:25; Jack Eichel (5) – 12:03; Chandler Stephenson (6) – 17:13		Second period	No scoring
No scoring		Third period	No scoring
Laurent Brossoit 3 saves / 4 shots Adin Hill 24 saves / 24 shots		Goalie stats	Stuart Skinner 19 saves / 23 shots Jack Campbell 9 saves / 10 shots

May 10	Vegas Golden Knights	1–4	Edmonton Oilers	Rogers Place	Recap
No scoring		First period	06:46 – Nick Bjugstad (3); 07:38 – pp – Evan Bouchard (4); 13:30 – Mattias Ekholm (1)
No scoring		Second period	14:45 – Ryan Nugent-Hopkins (1)
Nicolas Roy (1) – 05:58		Third period	No scoring
Adin Hill 29 saves / 33 shots		Goalie stats	Stuart Skinner 25 saves / 26 shots

May 12	Edmonton Oilers	3–4	Vegas Golden Knights	T-Mobile Arena	Recap
Connor McDavid (6) – pp – 03:02; Zach Hyman (3) – pp – 09:56		First period	03:52 – Jack Eichel (6)
No scoring		Second period	14:05 – pp – Mark Stone (5); 14:34 – pp – Reilly Smith (1); 15:34 – Nicolas Hague (1)
Connor McDavid (7) – pp – 02:40		Third period	No scoring
Stuart Skinner 18 saves / 22 shots Jack Campbell 9 saves / 9 shots		Goalie stats	Adin Hill 32 saves / 35 shots

May 14	Vegas Golden Knights	5–2	Edmonton Oilers	Rogers Place	Recap
Reilly Smith (2) – 00:24		First period	00:55 – Connor McDavid (8); 02:43 – Warren Foegele (2)
Jonathan Marchessault (3) – 04:26; Jonathan Marchessault (4) – 07:44; Jonathan Marchessault (5) – 18:36		Second period	No scoring
William Karlsson (5) – en – 19:21		Third period	No scoring
Adin Hill 38 saves / 40 shots		Goalie stats	Stuart Skinner 13 saves / 17 shots Jack Campbell 4 saves / 4 shots

Vegas won series 4–2

== Conference finals ==
=== Eastern Conference final ===
==== (M1) Carolina Hurricanes vs. (WC2) Florida Panthers ====
This was the first playoff meeting between these two teams. Carolina made their fifth conference finals appearance. They were defeated in a four-game sweep against the Boston Bruins in their most recent Conference final in 2019. This was Florida's second conference final appearance. Their only prior appearance was in 1996, which they won against the Pittsburgh Penguins in seven games. Carolina won two of the three games in this year's regular season series.

The Panthers defeated the Hurricanes in four games, the first four-game sweep in franchise history. Each game was decided by a single goal, with two of them going to overtime. Game one was tied 2–2 after three periods, so it went to overtime. Ryan Lomberg appeared to have scored early in the first overtime period, but the goal was disallowed due to goaltender interference. With 12.7 seconds remaining in the fourth overtime period, Matthew Tkachuk scored for Florida to end the sixth-longest playoff game in NHL history. Game two also went to overtime with Tkachuk again providing the winning goal for Florida in a 2–1 victory. In game three, Sergei Bobrovsky stopped all 32 shots he faced, helping the Panthers to a 1–0 victory which gave them a 3–0 series lead. In game four, the Hurricanes fought back from a two-goal deficit to tie the game. However, another goal from Tkachuk with less than five seconds left in the game sealed Florida's 4–3 victory, thus the Panthers advanced to the Stanley Cup Final for the second time in their history.

May 18	Florida Panthers	3–2	4OT	Carolina Hurricanes	PNC Arena	Recap
No scoring		First period		19:48 – pp – Seth Jarvis (5)
Aleksander Barkov (3) – 15:28; Carter Verhaeghe (6) – 17:43		Second period		No scoring
No scoring		Third period		03:47 – pp – Stefan Noesen (4)
Matthew Tkachuk (6) – 19:47		Fourth overtime period		No scoring
Sergei Bobrovsky 63 saves / 65 shots		Goalie stats		Frederik Andersen 57 saves / 60 shots

May 20	Florida Panthers	2–1	OT	Carolina Hurricanes	PNC Arena	Recap
No scoring		First period		01:43 – Jalen Chatfield (1)
Aleksander Barkov (4) – 07:43		Second period		No scoring
No scoring		Third period		No scoring
Matthew Tkachuk (7) – pp – 01:51		First overtime period		No scoring
Sergei Bobrovsky 37 saves / 38 shots		Goalie stats		Antti Raanta 24 saves / 26 shots

May 22	Carolina Hurricanes	0–1	Florida Panthers	FLA Live Arena	Recap
No scoring		First period	No scoring
No scoring		Second period	10:05 – pp – Sam Reinhart (7)
No scoring		Third period	No scoring
Frederik Andersen 16 saves / 17 shots		Goalie stats	Sergei Bobrovsky 32 saves / 32 shots

May 24	Carolina Hurricanes	3–4	Florida Panthers	FLA Live Arena	Recap
Paul Stastny (4) – 13:03		First period	00:41 – Anthony Duclair (3); 10:23 – pp – Matthew Tkachuk (8)
Teuvo Teravainen (1) – 02:51		Second period	09:49 – Ryan Lomberg (1)
Jesper Fast (6) – 16:38		Third period	19:55 – pp – Matthew Tkachuk (9)
Frederik Andersen 20 saves / 24 shots		Goalie stats	Sergei Bobrovsky 36 saves / 39 shots

Florida won the series 4–0

=== Western Conference final ===
==== (P1) Vegas Golden Knights vs. (C2) Dallas Stars ====
This was the second playoff series between these two teams. Vegas made their fourth Conference final/Stanley Cup semifinal appearance. They were defeated in 2021 by the Montreal Canadiens in six games in their most recent appearance. This was Dallas's tenth Conference final/Stanley Cup semifinal appearance since the league began using a 16-team or greater playoff format in 1980. Their most recent appearance in the Conference final/Stanley Cup semifinal was in 2020 against the Golden Knights, which is also their most recent playoff matchup; Dallas won in five games. Dallas won all three games in this year's regular season series.

The Golden Knights defeated the Stars in six games. In game one, the Stars tied the game late to force overtime, but in the extra period, Brett Howden scored for Vegas to give the Golden Knights a 4–3 victory. Game two also required overtime, wherein Chandler Stephenson scored for Vegas to give the Golden Knights a 3–2 victory and a 2–0 series lead. In game three, Stars captain Jamie Benn was penalized for cross-checking Golden Knights captain Mark Stone resulting in an ejection for the Dallas forward. Benn received a two-game suspension as a result of his actions. Vegas won the game 4–0 on the backs of Adin Hill's 34-save shutout and Ivan Barbashev's goal and two assists. Game four required overtime and in the subsequent overtime period, Joe Pavelski scored for Dallas to force a fifth game. In game five, Ty Dellandrea's two goals in the third period helped Dallas achieve a 4–2 victory, forcing a sixth game. In game six, William Karlsson scored twice and provided an assist and Hill stopped all 23 shots for the Golden Knights to defeat the Stars 6–0 to advance to the Stanley Cup Final.

May 19	Dallas Stars	3–4	OT	Vegas Golden Knights	T-Mobile Arena	Recap
Jason Robertson (3) – 18:44		First period		No scoring
No scoring		Second period		09:17 – William Karlsson (6)
Roope Hintz (10) – 04:01; Jamie Benn (3) – 18:01		Third period		01:19 – William Karlsson (7); 09:20 – Teddy Blueger (1)
No scoring		First overtime period		01:35 – Brett Howden (3)
Jake Oettinger 33 saves / 37 shots		Goalie stats		Adin Hill 33 saves / 36 shots

May 21	Dallas Stars	2–3	OT	Vegas Golden Knights	T-Mobile Arena	Recap
Miro Heiskanen (1) – 02:47		First period		10:08 – pp – Mark Stone (6)
Jason Robertson (4) – pp – 09:21		Second period		No scoring
No scoring		Third period		17:38 – Jonathan Marchessault (6)
No scoring		First overtime period		01:12 – Chandler Stephenson (7)
Jake Oettinger 21 saves / 24 shots		Goalie stats		Adin Hill 26 saves / 28 shots

May 23	Vegas Golden Knights	4–0	Dallas Stars	American Airlines Center	Recap
Jonathan Marchessault (7) – 01:11; Ivan Barbashev (5) – pp – 05:57; William Carrier (1) – 07:10		First period	No scoring
Alex Pietrangelo (1) – 08:28		Second period	No scoring
No scoring		Third period	No scoring
Adin Hill 34 saves / 34 shots		Goalie stats	Jake Oettinger 2 saves / 5 shots Scott Wedgewood 10 saves / 11 shots

May 25	Vegas Golden Knights	2–3	OT	Dallas Stars	American Airlines Center	Recap
William Karlsson (8) – 04:17		First period		15:42 – pp – Jason Robertson (5)
Jonathan Marchessault (8) – 10:23		Second period		17:21 – Jason Robertson (6)
No scoring		Third period		No scoring
No scoring		First overtime period		03:18 – pp – Joe Pavelski (9)
Adin Hill 39 saves / 42 shots		Goalie stats		Jake Oettinger 37 saves / 39 shots

May 27	Dallas Stars	4–2	Vegas Golden Knights	T-Mobile Arena	Recap
Luke Glendening (2) – 15:24		First period	13:36 – Ivan Barbashev (6)
Jason Robertson (7) – 05:29		Second period	03:20 – Chandler Stephenson (8)
Ty Dellandrea (2) – 10:35; Ty Dellandrea (3) – 12:02		Third period	No scoring
Jake Oettinger 27 saves / 29 shots		Goalie stats	Adin Hill 30 saves / 34 shots

May 29	Vegas Golden Knights	6–0	Dallas Stars	American Airlines Center	Recap
William Carrier (2) – 03:41; William Karlsson (9) – pp – 10:25; Keegan Kolesar (2) – 14:00		First period	No scoring
Jonathan Marchessault (9) – 10:25		Second period	No scoring
William Karlsson (10) – 02:06; Michael Amadio (3) – 12:25		Third period	No scoring
Adin Hill 23 saves / 23 shots		Goalie stats	Jake Oettinger 23 saves / 29 shots

Vegas won series 4–2

== Stanley Cup Final ==
This was the first playoff meeting between these two teams. This was Vegas's second Finals appearance. Their only previous Finals appearance was in 2018, during their inaugural season, which they lost to the Washington Capitals in five games. Florida made their second Finals appearance as well. Their only previous Finals appearance was in 1996, which they lost to the Colorado Avalanche in a four-game sweep. As had been the case in 2018, this Finals series featured two teams that did not previously win the Stanley Cup. These teams split the two games in this year's regular season series.

June 3	Florida Panthers	2–5	Vegas Golden Knights	T-Mobile Arena	Recap
Eric Staal (2) – sh – 09:40		First period	17:18 – pp – Jonathan Marchessault (10)
Anthony Duclair (4) – 19:49		Second period	10:54 – Shea Theodore (1)
No scoring		Third period	06:59 – Zach Whitecloud (2); 13:41 – Mark Stone (7); 18:15 – pp-en – Reilly Smith (3)
Sergei Bobrovsky 29 saves / 33 shots		Goalie stats	Adin Hill 33 saves / 35 shots

June 5	Florida Panthers	2–7	Vegas Golden Knights	T-Mobile Arena	Recap
No scoring		First period	07:05 – pp – Jonathan Marchessault (11); 17:59 – Alec Martinez (1)
No scoring		Second period	02:59 – Nicolas Roy (2); 07:10 – Brett Howden (4)
Anton Lundell (2) – 00:14; Matthew Tkachuk (10) – 12:44		Third period	02:10 – Jonathan Marchessault (12); 10:33 – Michael Amadio (4); 17:52 – pp – Brett Howden (5)
Sergei Bobrovsky 9 saves / 13 shots Alex Lyon 12 saves / 15 shots		Goalie stats	Adin Hill 29 saves / 31 shots

June 8	Vegas Golden Knights	2–3	OT	Florida Panthers	FLA Live Arena	Recap
Mark Stone (8) – pp – 16:03		First period		04:08 – Brandon Montour (7)
Jonathan Marchessault (13) – pp – 14:59		Second period		No scoring
No scoring		Third period		17:47 – Matthew Tkachuk (11)
No scoring		First overtime period		04:27 – Carter Verhaeghe (7)
Adin Hill 20 saves / 23 shots		Goalie stats		Sergei Bobrovsky 25 saves / 27 shots

June 10	Vegas Golden Knights	3–2	Florida Panthers	FLA Live Arena	Recap
Chandler Stephenson (9) – 01:39		First period	No scoring
Chandler Stephenson (10) – 07:28; William Karlsson (11) – 11:04		Second period	16:09 – Brandon Montour (8)
No scoring		Third period	03:50 – Aleksander Barkov (5)
Adin Hill 29 saves / 31 shots		Goalie stats	Sergei Bobrovsky 28 saves / 31 shots

June 13	Florida Panthers	3–9	Vegas Golden Knights	T-Mobile Arena	Recap
No scoring		First period	11:52 – sh – Mark Stone (9); 13:41 – Nicolas Hague (2)
Aaron Ekblad (2) – 02:15		Second period	10:28 – Alec Martinez (2); 12:13 – Reilly Smith (4); 17:15 – Mark Stone (10); 19:58 – Michael Amadio (5)
Sam Reinhart (8) – 08:47; Sam Bennett (5) – 11:39		Third period	08:22 – Ivan Barbashev (7); 14:06 – en – Mark Stone (11); 18:58 – Nicolas Roy (3)
Sergei Bobrovsky 23 saves / 31 shots		Goalie stats	Adin Hill 32 saves / 35 shots

Vegas won series 4–1

== Player statistics ==
=== Skaters ===
These were the top ten skaters based on points, following the conclusion of the playoffs.

Player	Team	GP	G	A	Pts	+/–	PIM
Jack Eichel	Vegas Golden Knights	22	6	20	26	+14	14
Jonathan Marchessault	Vegas Golden Knights	22	13	12	25	+17	14
Matthew Tkachuk	Florida Panthers	20	11	13	24	+12	74
Mark Stone	Vegas Golden Knights	22	11	13	24	+5	8
Roope Hintz	Dallas Stars	19	10	14	24	+4	8
Chandler Stephenson	Vegas Golden Knights	22	10	10	20	+3	30
Connor McDavid	Edmonton Oilers	12	8	12	20	–1	0
Leon Draisaitl	Edmonton Oilers	12	13	5	18	–1	10
Jason Robertson	Dallas Stars	19	7	11	18	0	2
Ivan Barbashev	Vegas Golden Knights	22	7	11	18	+14	18

=== Goaltenders ===
This is a combined table of the top five goaltenders based on goals against average (GAA) and the top five goaltenders based on save percentage (SV%), with at least 420 minutes played. The table is sorted by GAA, and the criteria for inclusion are bolded.

Player	Team	GP	W	L	SA	GA	GAA	SV%	SO	TOI
Frederik Andersen	Carolina Hurricanes	9	5	3	245	18	**1.83**	**.927**	0	590:18
Igor Shesterkin	New York Rangers	7	3	4	203	14	**1.96**	**.931**	0	427:38
Adin Hill	Vegas Golden Knights	16	11	4	488	33	**2.17**	**.932**	2	913:20
Akira Schmid	New Jersey Devils	9	4	4	229	18	**2.35**	**.921**	2	459:46
Sergei Bobrovsky	Florida Panthers	19	12	6	639	54	**2.78**	**.915**	1	1,164:21

== Media ==
=== Canada ===
In Canada, this marked the ninth postseason under Rogers Media's 12-year contract. Games aired across Sportsnet, SN1, SN360, FX, Citytv, and CBC under the Hockey Night in Canada brand. For the first and second rounds' U.S.–U.S. games not on CBC, Sportsnet generally simulcasted the U.S. feed instead of producing their own telecast. Games were streamed live on Sportsnet Now and CBCSports.ca (for games televised on CBC).

=== United States ===
In the U.S., this marked the second year of a seven-year agreement with the ESPN family of networks and Warner Bros. Discovery (WBD) Sports (formerly Turner Sports). Games aired across ABC, ESPN, ESPN2, TBS, and TNT. Each U.S. team's regional broadcaster produced local coverage of the first round (except for Saturday primetime games on ABC, which the network began broadcasting this postseason). Only selected ESPN/ABC games were streamed live on ESPN+; for other games, live streams were only available for pay-TV subscribers via authenticated streaming on ESPN and TNT/TBS's respective apps.

Like the previous year, first-round games were roughly split between ESPN-produced telecasts and WBD-produced telecasts, ensuring that both broadcasters televised two of the first four games in each series and roughly half of the total first-round games. In the second round this year, coverage of all four series was also split roughly evenly between the ESPN networks and TNT/TBS, rather than being de facto exclusive broadcasters for two specific series the previous year.

Under their contract, ESPN/ABC had the first choice of which Conference finals series to broadcast, selecting the Vegas–Dallas Western Conference finals series. TNT aired the Hurricanes–Panthers Eastern Conference finals series. Had ESPN selected the Eastern Conference finals instead, the Panthers would have gone head-to-head with the Miami Heat in the NBA Eastern Conference finals (airing on TNT).

As per the yearly alternating rotation, the 2023 Stanley Cup Final aired on TNT. This marked the first time that the network carried the Stanley Cup Final and the first time since 1994 that the entire series aired only on cable television in the U.S. The Stanley Cup Final were also simulcast on WBD sister networks TruTV and TBS.

American national radio rights to select Stanley Cup playoff games, including the entire Conference finals and Stanley Cup Final, were broadcast on the Sports USA Radio Network via NHL Radio. This was the second of a four-year deal signed between the NHL and Sports USA to syndicate NHL games on U.S. national radio.

=== Scheduling controversy ===
Game two of the Edmonton–Vegas series was originally scheduled for Friday, May 5. However, due to the NBA's Miami Heat's home game against the New York Knicks along with the 2023 Miami Grand Prix, game three of Florida–Toronto was moved from Saturday, May 6 to Sunday, May 7, leaving the traditional Hockey Night in Canada timeslot available. Thus, game two of the Edmonton–Vegas series was moved to Saturday, May 6, while a tripleheader of the other three series was held on Sunday, May 7. This left several Edmonton fans to suffer cancelation/rescheduling fees for flights and tickets as they were not initially aware of the NHL schedule change. As a result, game six of the Edmonton–Vegas series was moved to Sunday, May 14; despite this becoming the lone game on that day after both Eastern Conference second round series finished in five games, the start time was pushed to 10:00 p.m. ET so ESPN could air it after Sunday Night Baseball.

Preceded by 2022 Stanley Cup playoffs	Stanley Cup playoffs 2023	Succeeded by 2024 Stanley Cup playoffs
