= Nathan Bastian =

Canadian ice hockey player (born 1997)

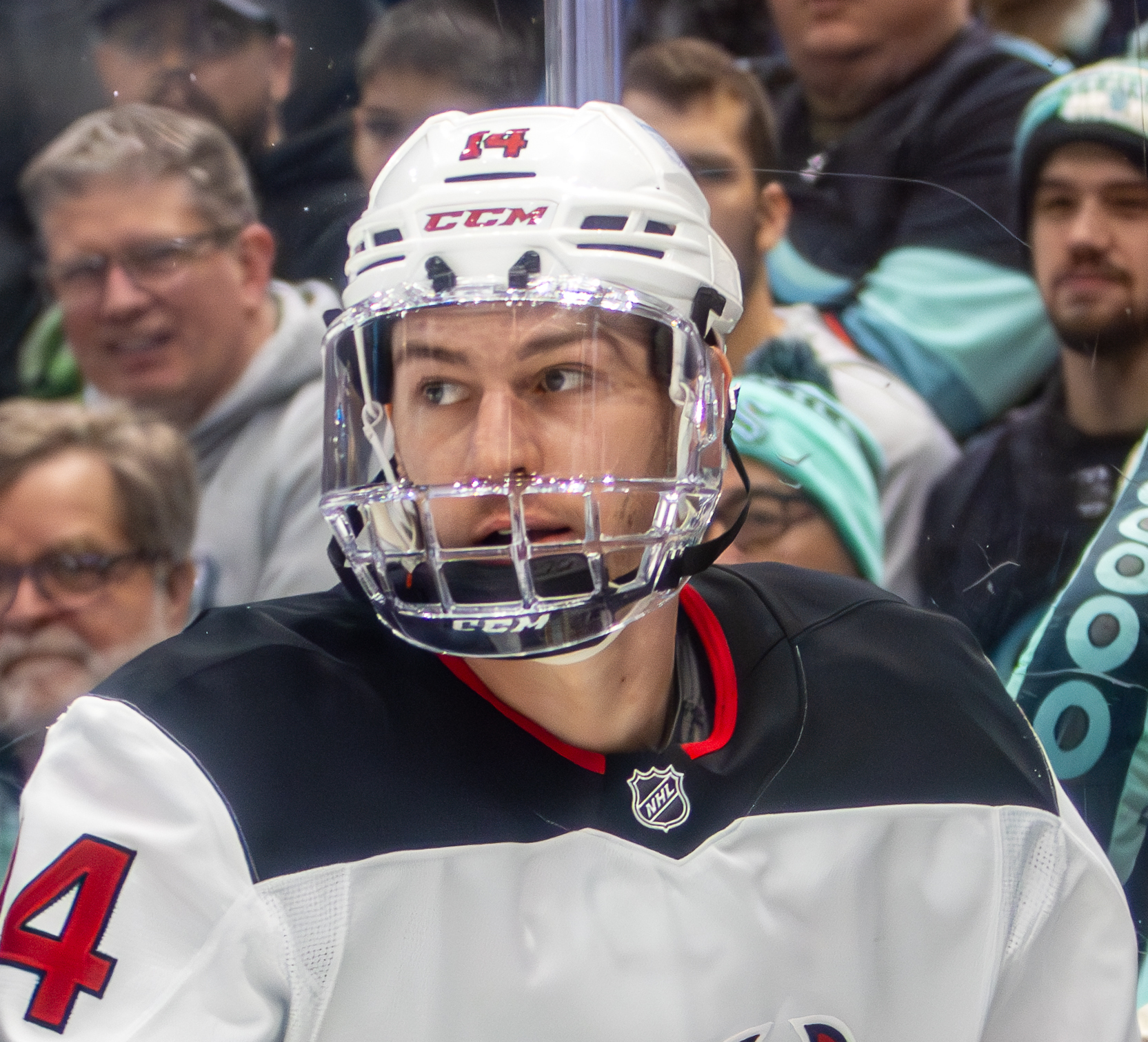
- Bastian with the New Jersey Devils in 2025
- Born: December 6, 1997 (age 28) Kitchener, Ontario, Canada
- Height: 6 ft 4 in (193 cm)
- Weight: 217 lb (98 kg; 15 st 7 lb)
- Position: Right wing
- Shoots: Right
- NHL team (P) Cur. team Former teams: Florida Panthers; Charlotte Checkers (AHL); New Jersey Devils; Seattle Kraken; Dallas Stars
- NHL draft: 41st overall, 2016; New Jersey Devils
- Playing career: 2017–present

Nathan Bastian (born December 6, 1997) is a Canadian professional ice hockey player who is a right winger for the Charlotte Checkers in the American Hockey League (AHL) while under contract with the Florida Panthers of the National Hockey League (NHL). He was selected by the New Jersey Devils in the second round, 41st overall, in the 2016 NHL entry draft.

Bastian started his hockey career in Ontario, playing for the Mississauga Steelheads of the Ontario Hockey League starting in 2013. After four years with the team, in 2017, he joined the Devils organization, starting with their American Hockey League affiliate, the Binghamton Devils. He made his NHL debut in 2018, and he split time between New Jersey and Binghamton until his first full season with New Jersey in 2020. After that campaign, he was selected by the Seattle Kraken in the 2021 NHL expansion draft. After playing 12 games with the Kraken, he was placed on waivers by the team, and he was then claimed by the Devils. After four more seasons with the Devils, Bastian signed as a free agent with the Dallas Stars.

== Playing career ==
=== Junior ===
On April 6, 2013, Bastian was selected by the Mississauga Steelheads of the Ontario Hockey League (OHL) in the seventh round, 127th overall, in the 2013 OHL priority selection. Bastian played at the midget level with the Brantford 99ers of the Greater Ontario Junior Hockey League to begin the 2013–14 season, collecting 11 goals and 16 assists for 27 points through 29 games. He then joined the Steelheads later that season, contributing two goals and one assist in 21 games. During the 2014–15 season, his first full campaign, he was the only Steelhead to play in all 68 games, while tallying 17 goals and 29 assists, earning him the honor of being Mississauga's Hardest Working Player.

During the 2015–16 season, Bastian played on the Steelheads' top line, registering four goals and an assist through his first six games. On September 25, 2015, Bastian recorded two goals and an assist in a 7–0 victory over the Ottawa 67's. On December 6, Bastian scored the first goal in the Steelheads' teddy bear toss night, while also registering two assists in the game. On January 7, 2016, he was named to Team Orr to participate in the 2016 CHL/NHL Top Prospects game. At the game on January 28, he helped Team Orr to victory over Team Cherry. On February 15, he recorded two goals as part of a 6–2 victory over the Niagara IceDogs. He finished the season with 19 goals and 40 assists in 64 games. During the playoffs, he notched four assists through five games. After the season, the NHL Central Scouting Bureau ranked Bastian 35th overall among North American skaters in their Final Rankings before the 2016 NHL entry draft. On June 25, 2016, he was drafted by the New Jersey Devils in the second round, 41st overall, of the draft.

Bastian signed a three-year, entry-level contract with the Devils on October 20, 2016. In 58 games during the 2016–17 season, he collected 16 goals and 29 assists. During the playoffs, on March 30, 2017, he recorded a hat-trick in a 6–4 victory over the Ottawa 67's. He finished the playoffs with seven goals and seven assists in 20 games, as the Steelheads advanced to the Final, but lost in five games to the Erie Otters.

=== Professional ===
==== New Jersey Devils ====
After attending the New Jersey Devils' training camp, Bastian was assigned to their American Hockey League affiliate, the Binghamton Devils, on September 26, 2017, to start the 2017–18 season. In the season opener on October 7, he scored his first professional goal on a penalty shot against Christopher Gibson, helping the Devils to a 2–1 win over the Bridgeport Islanders. On December 8, he scored two goals against the Syracuse Crunch, the only Devils goals in a 5–2 loss. He finished the season managing 10 goals and eight assists through 68 games.

On September 23, 2018, Bastian was assigned to Binghamton to start the 2018–19 season. Through his first 21 games of the season, he recorded six points. After totaling five goals and 10 assists through the first 43 games, he received his first recall to New Jersey on January 19, 2019. He made his NHL debut that night, getting into his first NHL fight against Josh Manson and registering 9:32 of ice time in a 3–2 loss to the Anaheim Ducks, but he was returned to the AHL soon after. On February 24, he was recalled to New Jersey again. The next day, he scored his first NHL goal as part of a 2–1 victory against the Montreal Canadiens. On March 1, in a contest against the Philadelphia Flyers, Bastian left the game in the third period with what was later determined to be an upper-body injury. On March 25, he returned to practicing with the team, and on April 1, he joined the team in their 4–2 win against the New York Rangers, in which he got into another fight, this time against Tony DeAngelo. On April 6, he recorded two goals as part of a 4–3 overtime win against the Florida Panthers, finishing his time in the NHL with three goals through seven games. He was reassigned to Binghamton the next day, playing with the team until he ended the season with 18 goals and 24 points in 58 games.

After participating in the preseason with the Devils, Bastian was assigned to Binghamton to start the 2019–20 season on September 27, 2019. Through his first 13 games, he managed two goals and seven assists to start the season. On February 19, 2020, he recorded a goal and an assist in a 5–3 win over the Toronto Marlies. He ended the season with 22 assists and 38 points through 62 games. Before the 2020–21 season, Bastian was named to New Jersey's opening roster for the first time in his career. On February 3, 2021, after recording four points through the first nine games of the campaign, he was added to the Devils' COVID-19 list, staying there until he was removed 12 days later. On March 18, in a 3–2 win over the Pittsburgh Penguins, Bastian left the game in the second period. Two days later, it was announced that he would be week-to-week with a lower-body injury. He returned to the lineup in a 6–3 win over the New York Rangers on April 17 after missing 15 games. He finished the season with three goals and seven assists in 41 games, while leading the team in hits with 136. On June 15, Bastian was re-signed to a two-year, US$1,650,000 contract by the Devils.

==== Seattle Kraken, second stint with New Jersey, and Dallas Stars ====
On July 21, 2021, Bastian was selected from the Devils at the 2021 NHL expansion draft by the Seattle Kraken. He was named to the team's opening roster for their inaugural 2021–22 season. He scored his first goal with the team in a 5–4 loss to the Arizona Coyotes on November 6. He played 12 games with the Kraken and added an assist before he was placed on waivers on November 24. He was claimed off waivers the next day by his former team, the New Jersey Devils. After registering five points in 17 games with the Devils, he was placed on the team's COVID-19 list on January 8. After missing one game, he was taken off the list on January 13, returning to the lineup that day in a 3–2 loss to the New York Islanders, in which he scored. On April 3, he left the first period of a 4–3 loss to the Islanders with an undisclosed injury. He missed three games due to the injury, but tallied two assists in three games after returning. He finished the season notching 11 goals and five assists in 60 games with the Devils.

On November 26, 2022, in a game against the Washington Capitals, Bastian suffered an injury to his shoulder. He was placed on injured reserve retroactive to that date on December 22, after missing 11 games. On January 19, 2023, he was removed from the injured reserve list and played his first game back against the Seattle Kraken. After trying to play through his injury, he again aggravated it, missing 11 games from March 12 to April 4. He ended the season with six goals and nine assists through 43 games. On May 3, in the 2023 Stanley Cup playoffs, Bastian scored his first career NHL playoff goal in a 5–1 loss against the Carolina Hurricanes. Through 12 playoff games, he finished with only that goal and an assist.

On July 1, 2023, before the 2023–24 season, Bastian signed a two-year, US$2,700,000 contract to stay with the Devils. On February 22, 2024, in a contest against the New York Rangers, Bastian left the game with a lower-body injury. The following day, he was placed on injured reserve by the Devils. After missing the final 26 games of the season, Bastian ended the campaign with five goals and seven assists in 54 games. During the 2024–25 season, after a fight with Ryan Lomberg in a game against the Calgary Flames on November 1, 2024, Bastian left with a jaw injury. He was placed on long-term injured reserve retroactive to that date on November 18, and after missing 16 games, he was taken off of injured reserve on December 10. He ended the season with four goals and six assists through 59 games. On August 9, 2025, as a free agent, Bastian signed a one-year, US$775,000 contract with the Dallas Stars.

==== Florida Panthers ====
As a free agent from the Stars, Bastian went un-signed over the summer before attending the Florida Panthers training camp on a professional try-out basis. On September 28, 2026, Bastian secured a one-year, two-way contract with the Panthers for the 2026–27 season.

== Career statistics ==
			Regular season					Playoffs
Season	Team	League	GP	G	A	Pts	PIM	GP	G	A	Pts	PIM
2013–14	Brantford 99ers	GOJHL	48	17	29	46	24	—	—	—	—	—
2013–14	Mississauga Steelheads	OHL	21	2	1	3	6	4	0	0	0	2
2014–15	Mississauga Steelheads	OHL	68	17	12	29	22	—	—	—	—	—
2015–16	Mississauga Steelheads	OHL	64	19	40	59	50	5	0	4	4	0
2016–17	Mississauga Steelheads	OHL	58	16	29	45	43	20	7	7	14	16
2017–18	Binghamton Devils	AHL	68	10	8	18	45	—	—	—	—	—
2018–19	Binghamton Devils	AHL	58	18	6	24	63	—	—	—	—	—
2018–19	New Jersey Devils	NHL	7	3	0	3	10	—	—	—	—	—
2019–20	Binghamton Devils	AHL	62	16	22	38	55	—	—	—	—	—
2020–21	New Jersey Devils	NHL	41	3	7	10	21	—	—	—	—	—
2021–22	Seattle Kraken	NHL	12	1	1	2	31	—	—	—	—	—
2021–22	New Jersey Devils	NHL	60	11	5	16	34	—	—	—	—	—
2022–23	New Jersey Devils	NHL	43	6	9	15	31	12	1	1	2	16
2023–24	New Jersey Devils	NHL	54	5	7	12	32	—	—	—	—	—
2024–25	New Jersey Devils	NHL	59	4	6	10	31	5	0	0	0	0
2025–26	Dallas Stars	NHL	36	6	1	7	21	—	—	—	—	—
2025–26	Texas Stars	AHL	4	2	1	3	2	—	—	—	—	—
NHL totals			312	39	36	75	211	17	1	1	2	16

== Awards and honours ==
Award	Year
OHL
CHL/NHL Top Prospects Game	2016
