= Owen Tippett =

Canadian ice hockey player (born 1999)

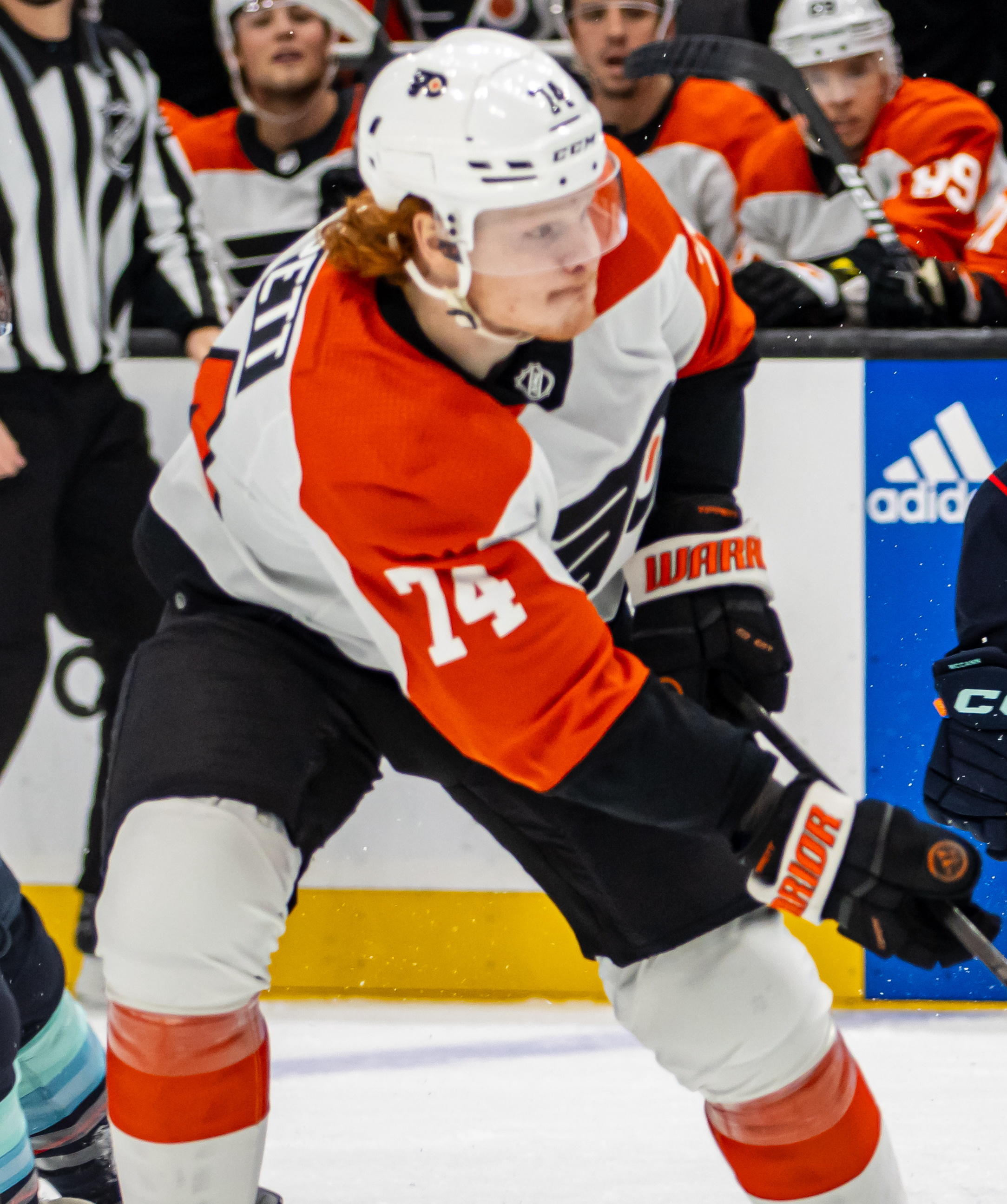
- Tippett with the Philadelphia Flyers in 2023
- Born: February 16, 1999 (age 27) Peterborough, Ontario, Canada
- Height: 6 ft 1 in (185 cm)
- Weight: 210 lb (95 kg; 15 st 0 lb)
- Position: Winger
- Shoots: Right
- NHL team Former teams: Philadelphia Flyers; Florida Panthers
- NHL draft: 10th overall, 2017; Florida Panthers
- Playing career: 2017–present

Owen Tippett (born February 16, 1999) is a Canadian professional ice hockey player who is a winger for the Philadelphia Flyers of the National Hockey League (NHL). He was selected in the first round, 10th overall, by the Florida Panthers in the 2017 NHL entry draft.

== Playing career ==
=== Junior hockey ===
==== Mississauga Steelheads (2015–19) ====
Considered by scouts as the best pure natural goal scorer at his age group, Tippett was drafted in the first round, fourth overall, in the 2015 OHL Priority Selection by the Mississauga Steelheads. Tippett appeared in his first career OHL game on September 25, 2015, as he was held with no points in a 7–0 win over the Ottawa 67's. Tippett recorded his first OHL goal and point in his fourth career game, as he scored against Lucas Peressini of the Kingston Frontenacs in a 3–1 victory on October 2. On November 20, Tippett recorded his first multi goal game, as he scored twice against Jake Kment of the North Bay Battalion in a 7–0 win. Tippett scored 15 goals and 20 points in 48 games in his rookie OHL season, and was named to the OHL's First All-Rookie Team. In his first career OHL playoff game, Tippett earned an assist in a 5–2 loss to the Barrie Colts. In game six of the series against the Colts, Tippett scored his first career OHL playoff goal against goaltender Mackenzie Blackwood in a 7–0 Steelheads victory. In seven playoff games, Tippett scored a goal and three points as Mississauga lost to the Barrie Colts in the conference quarter-finals.

Tippett had a very impressive season in 2016–17, scoring 44 goals, which led the team and ranked him fifth in the OHL, and 75 points in 60 games with the Steelheads, helping the team finish in first place in the Central Division. On December 4, Tippett set a career high with four points in a game against the Ottawa 67's, scoring two goals and adding two assists in a 6–3 win. Tippett opened the post-season with a four point effort, scoring a goal and three assists in a 6–2 victory over the Ottawa 67's. Tippett continued his very strong play in the post-season, scoring 10 goals and 19 points in 20 games, as the Steelheads advanced to the J. Ross Robertson Cup finals, where they lost to the Erie Otters.

Tippett returned to the Steelheads in 2017–18 after beginning the season with the Florida Panthers. In 51 games with Mississauga, Tippett scored 36 goals to lead the club, and earned 75 points. On January 4, Tippett recorded his first career OHL hat trick, scoring three goals in the first period against Tyler Johnson in a 4–3 shootout victory over the Sault Ste. Marie Greyhounds. On March 4, Tippett earned his second hat trick of the season, scoring three goals against Daniel Murphy and adding an assist in a 7–2 win over the Erie Otters. In the playoffs, Tippett scored three goals and five points in six games as the Steelheads lost to the Barrie Colts in the conference quarter-finals.

The Florida Panthers returned Tippett to the Steelheads after training camp for the 2018–19 season. Tippett played in 23 games with Mississauga, scoring 19 goals and 33 points. In his first game of the season on September 28, Tippett scored three goals against Noah Battaglia of the Erie Otters, and added an assist in a 6–1 Steelheads victory. On November 18, Tippett had another four point game, scoring two goals and adding two assists in a 5–3 win over the Sudbury Wolves. On January 5, 2019, Tippett was traded to the Saginaw Spirit in exchange for Aidan Prueter and six draft picks.

==== Saginaw Spirit (2019) ====
Tippett finished the 2018–19 season with the Saginaw Spirit following a mid-season trade. In his first game with the Spirit on January 5, 2019, Tippett scored an empty net goal and added an assist in a 5–2 win over the Kitchener Rangers. On February 13, Tippett scored three goals against the Flint Firebirds in a 9–2 victory. On February 23, Tippett tied his career high with points in a game, as he scored a goal and four points in a 6–3 victory over the Hamilton Bulldogs. Less than a month later, Tippett again matched his career high with points in a game, as he earned four points against the Sarnia Sting, helping Saginaw win the game 6–2. In 31 games with the Spirit, Tippett scored 14 goals and 41 points, helping the club finish in first place in the West Division.

In the 2019 OHL playoffs, Tippett had back-to-back three point games in the Western Conference quarter-finals against the Sarnia Sting, helping Saginaw sweep the series. Tippett continued the strong play during the first three games in the conference semi-finals, as Tippett had three consecutive three point games against the Sault Ste. Marie Greyhounds. While the Greyhounds help Tippett pointless in the final three games, the Spirit defeated the Greyhounds and advanced to the Western Conference finals. In seven games against the Guelph Storm, Tippett was held to two goals and five points, including no points in the final three games, as Guelph defeated Saginaw in seven games. In 17 playoff games, Tippett scored 11 goals and 22 points.

=== Professional career ===
==== Florida Panthers (2017–2022) ====
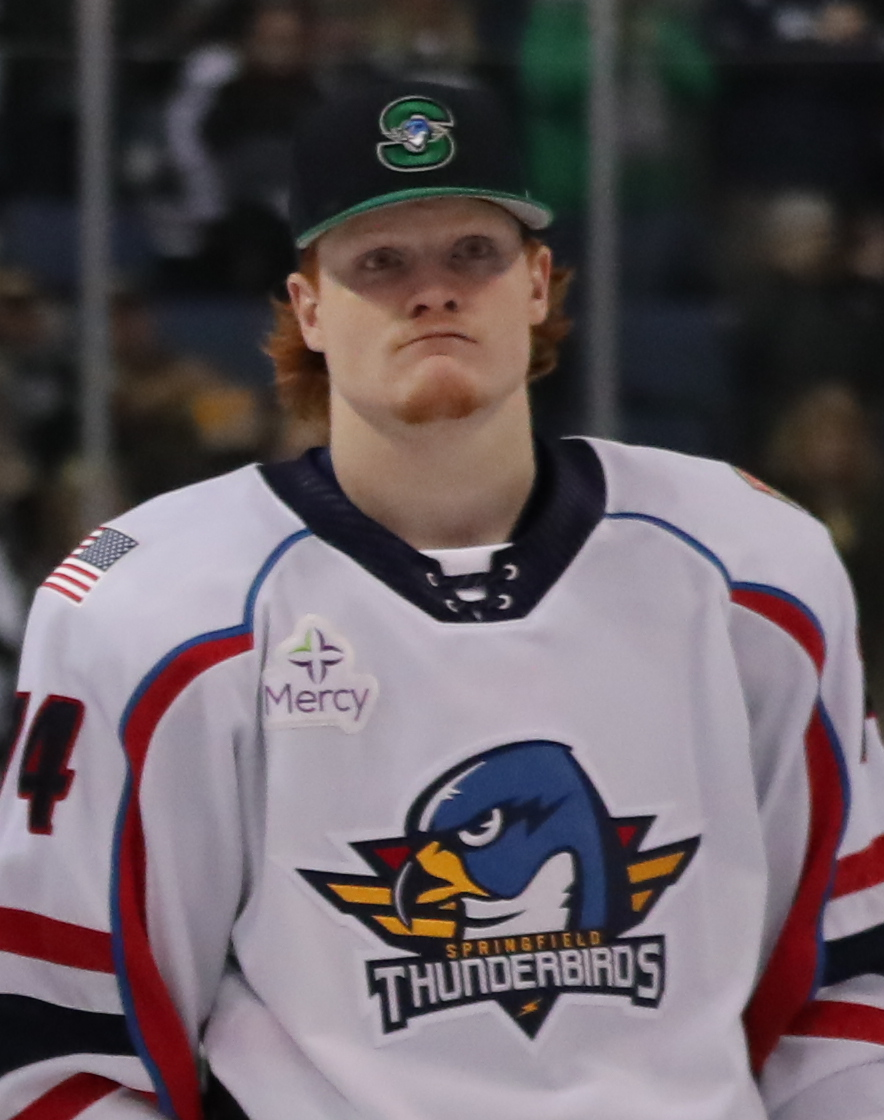
Tippett with the Springfield Thunderbirds in 2020

Prior to the 2017 NHL entry draft, Tippett was considered a top prospect. Considerable praise was given to his skating and shooting ability, with scouts considering him the best pure goal scorer in the draft. Tippett was selected 10th overall in the NHL 2017 entry draft by the Florida Panthers. On July 19, 2017, he agreed to a three-year, entry-level contract with the Panthers.

After an impressive training camp with the Panthers, Tippett made the opening night roster for the 2017–18 season. After starting as a healthy scratch, Tippett made his NHL debut with the Panthers, recording an impressive 7 shots, in a 5–1 defeat to the Philadelphia Flyers on October 17, 2017. Tippett appeared in 7 games with the Panthers before he was returned to continue his development in major junior with the Mississauga Steelheads on November 7, 2017. After participating at the Panthers training camp prior to the 2018–19 season, Tippett was returned to the Steelheads on September 27, 2018.

==== Philadelphia Flyers (2022–present) ====
Just days before the 2022 trade deadline, on March 19, 2022, Tippett was traded to the Philadelphia Flyers along with a 2024 first-round pick and a 2023 third-round pick in exchange for Claude Giroux, Connor Bunnaman, German Rubtsov, and a 2024 fifth-round pick. As a restricted free agent in the off-season, Tippett was tendered a qualifying offer and later re-signed to a two-year, $3 million contract extension with the Flyers on July 29.

On March 17, 2023, Tippett scored his first career NHL hat trick in a 5–2 victory over the Buffalo Sabres.

On January 26, 2024, Tippett signed an eight-year, $49.6 million extension with the Flyers.

== Personal life ==
Tippett is the cousin to Mitchell Stephens of the Seattle Kraken.

Despite sharing a surname, he is not related to longtime NHL head coach Dave Tippett.

== Career statistics ==
=== Regular season and playoffs ===
			Regular season					Playoffs
Season	Team	League	GP	G	A	Pts	PIM	GP	G	A	Pts	PIM
2013–14	Toronto Red Wings	GTHL	31	15	6	21	8	—	—	—	—	—
2014–15	Toronto Red Wings	GTHL	50	52	35	87	0	—	—	—	—	—
2014–15	Toronto Jr. Canadiens	OJHL	6	2	1	3	2	—	—	—	—	—
2015–16	Mississauga Steelheads	OHL	48	15	5	20	10	7	1	2	3	4
2016–17	Mississauga Steelheads	OHL	60	44	31	75	36	20	10	9	19	14
2017–18	Florida Panthers	NHL	7	1	0	1	0	—	—	—	—	—
2017–18	Mississauga Steelheads	OHL	51	36	39	75	30	6	3	2	5	4
2017–18	Springfield Thunderbirds	AHL	5	1	1	2	2	—	—	—	—	—
2018–19	Mississauga Steelheads	OHL	23	19	14	33	10	—	—	—	—	—
2018–19	Saginaw Spirit	OHL	31	14	27	41	8	17	11	11	22	0
2019–20	Springfield Thunderbirds	AHL	46	19	21	40	18	—	—	—	—	—
2020–21	Florida Panthers	NHL	45	7	11	18	6	6	1	3	4	0
2021–22	Florida Panthers	NHL	42	6	8	14	10	—	—	—	—	—
2021–22	Charlotte Checkers	AHL	12	6	12	18	2	—	—	—	—	—
2021–22	Philadelphia Flyers	NHL	21	4	3	7	2	—	—	—	—	—
2022–23	Philadelphia Flyers	NHL	77	27	22	49	16	—	—	—	—	—
2023–24	Philadelphia Flyers	NHL	78	28	25	53	12	—	—	—	—	—
2024–25	Philadelphia Flyers	NHL	77	20	23	43	16	—	—	—	—	—
2025–26	Philadelphia Flyers	NHL	81	28	23	51	32	6	1	1	2	0
NHL totals			428	121	115	236	94	12	2	4	6	0

=== International ===
Year	Team	Event	Result	GP	G	A	Pts	PIM
2015	Canada White	U17	1st place, gold medalist(s)	6	5	3	8	0
2016	Canada	U18	4th	7	1	2	3	12
2016	Canada	IH18	5th	4	1	1	2	0
2019	Canada	WJC	6th	5	2	2	4	0
Junior totals				22	9	8	17	12

Awards and achievements
Preceded by Henrik Borgström	Florida Panthers first-round draft pick 2017	Succeeded by Grigori Denisenko
