= Mason Marchment =

Canadian ice hockey player (born 1995)

- Marchment with the San Jose Sharks in 2026
- Born: June 18, 1995 (age 31) Uxbridge, Ontario, Canada
- Height: 6 ft 5 in (196 cm)
- Weight: 215 lb (98 kg; 15 st 5 lb)
- Position: Forward
- Shoots: Left
- NHL team Former teams: San Jose Sharks; Toronto Maple Leafs; Florida Panthers; Dallas Stars; Seattle Kraken; Columbus Blue Jackets
- NHL draft: Undrafted
- Playing career: 2016–present

Mason Marchment (born June 18, 1995) is a Canadian professional ice hockey player who is a forward for the San Jose Sharks of the National Hockey League (NHL). He entered the NHL undrafted, and made his NHL debut with the Toronto Maple Leafs in the 2019–20 season.

== Playing career ==
Marchment did not start his ice hockey career until the age of 16, playing two years of minor ice hockey with the Central Ontario Wolves U18 AAA team from 2011 to 2013. The following year, he played with the Cobourg Cougars of the Ontario Junior Hockey League (OJHL).

After going undrafted the previous three years of eligibility, Marchment made his junior ice hockey debut at age 19 as a training camp invitee with the Erie Otters of the Ontario Hockey League (OHL) in the 2014–15 season. Marchment was traded at the beginning of the 2015–16 season, and would play that season with the Hamilton Bulldogs and then the Mississauga Steelheads. He recorded 77 points (28 goals, 49 assists) in 115 career OHL regular-season games.

Marchment was signed by the Toronto Maple Leafs to an American Hockey League (AHL) contract on April 8, 2016, and would make his AHL debut with the Toronto Marlies in the final games of the 2015–16 season. He split his 2016–17 season between the Marlies and the Orlando Solar Bears of the ECHL minor professional team, playing most of the season with the ECHL.

Marchment spent his first full season in the AHL for the 2017–18 season, and signed a two-year, entry-level contract with the Maple Leafs on March 17, 2018. During the 2018 Calder Cup playoffs, Marchment recorded nine points over 20 games, and scored the winning goal in game 7 of the finals to win the Calder Cup for the Toronto Marlies. Marchment continued to play in the AHL during the following season, and recorded seven points in 13 games during the 2019 playoffs.

During the 2019–20 season, on January 1, 2020, after losing several forwards to injury, the Maple Leafs called up Marchment to make his NHL debut the following night against the Winnipeg Jets. He registered one assist in four appearances with the Maple Leafs, across multiple callups before he was traded by Toronto to the Florida Panthers in exchange for Denis Malgin on February 19. Marchment recorded 86 points (48 goals, 38 assists) in 157 career AHL games with the Toronto Marlies. He also recorded two assists over six games with the Springfield Thunderbirds, the AHL affiliate of the Panthers, before the COVID-19 shutdown, which lasted until February 2021.

On November 3, 2020, Marchment as a restricted free agent was re-signed by the Panthers to a one-year, two-way contract. On January 13, 2021, he was placed on the Panthers' taxi squad, and was activated for one NHL game on February 7 before being placed back on the taxi squad. He was then re-activated on February 25, and remained on the active roster through the end of the season. Marchment scored his first NHL goal on March 5, in a 5–4 win against the Nashville Predators, ending the season with 10 points over 33 regular-season games and two points over six playoff games.

On April 5, Marchment was signed to a one-year contract extension by the Panthers. On January 31, 2022, Marchment recorded a six-point (two goals and four assists) game, tying Olli Jokinen's franchise record for most points in a game, in the Panthers' 8–4 win over the Columbus Blue Jackets. On February 18, Marchment scored his first career hat-trick in a 6–2 win over the Minnesota Wild. Marchment faced multiple injuries throughout the 2021–22 season, finishing with 47 points (18 goals, 29 assists) in 54 regular season games and one goal in four playoff games.

As a free agent from the Panthers, Marchment was signed to a four-year, $18 million contract with the Dallas Stars on July 13, 2022. At the start of the 2022–23 season, Marchment made the NHL opening night roster for the first time in his career, and made his debut with the Stars in the season opener on October 13. He recorded two goals to lead his team to a 4–1 win over the Nashville Predators. Marchment suffered a knee injury on March 13, 2023, and missed 14 games, returning to the lineup on April 13. He finished the season with 31 points (12 goals, 19 assists) in 68 regular-season games and six points (four goals, two assists) in 18 playoff games. Marchment also recorded 80 penalty minutes, ranking first on the team and more than 20 minutes more than the next player.

On February 8, 2024, Marchment was fined $5,000, the maximum penalty allowed by the Collective Bargaining Agreement, for a late board-hit during the game the previous night against the Toronto Maple Leafs. Marchment finished the 2023–24 season with career-highs in points, goals, and assists, recording 53 points (22 goals, 31 assists) in 81 regular-season games, and five points (three goals, two assists) in 13 playoff games. He also recorded 54 penalty minutes, once again ranking first on the team, with 13 minutes more than the next player.

On December 27, 2024, Marchment was hit in the face by a deflected puck in a game against the Minnesota Wild and had to be taken to the hospital. He required facial surgery, and missed 17 games, returning to the lineup on February 2, 2025. Marchment would conclude the 2024–25 season with 47 points (22 goals, 25 assists) in 62 regular-season games and five points (one goal, four assists) in 18 playoff games.

On June 19, 2025, the Stars traded Marchment to the Seattle Kraken in exchange for a 2025 fourth-round pick and a 2026 third-round pick. Marchment played 29 games registering 13 points with the Kraken, before being traded on December 19, 2025, to the Columbus Blue Jackets in exchange for 2026 fourth-round pick and a 2027 second-round pick.

Marchment scored a goal in his Columbus debut on December 20, and went on to record six points in his first five games with the franchise, his longest point streak. On January 24, 2026, Marchment had his first four-point game, which included a hat trick in an 8–3 win against the Tampa Bay Lightning. On March 17, he scored his 12th goal with the franchise, breaking the record for most goals by a Columbus player in their first 25 games. With the Blue Jackets, Marchment registered 32 points (15 goals, 17 assists) in 39 games and had a career-high shot percentage of 20.5%.

A free agent at the end of the 2025–26 season, Marchment signed a five-year, $33.75 million contract with the San Jose Sharks on July 1, 2026. Marchment made his Sharks debut in the 2026–27 season opener on October 1, against the Florida Panthers. His first goal as a Shark was also the team's first goal of the season, and he and his late father, Bryan Marchment, became the second father–son duo to score for the Sharks.

== Personal life ==
Marchment is the son of the late Bryan Marchment, a longtime NHL defenceman, and his wife, Kim. Marchment has one sister, Logan. Mason has played for two teams that his father, Bryan also played for, the Toronto Maple Leafs and the San Jose Sharks. On the Sharks, Mason wears the No. 27, which was his father's number while he played with the organization. His cousin, Kennedy Marchment, previously played with the Montreal Victoire of the Professional Women's Hockey League (PWHL).

== Career statistics ==
			Regular season					Playoffs
Season	Team	League	GP	G	A	Pts	PIM	GP	G	A	Pts	PIM
2013–14	Cobourg Cougars	OJHL	51	22	21	43	84	11	1	5	6	11
2014–15	Erie Otters	OHL	54	8	18	26	29	10	0	1	1	4
2015–16	Hamilton Bulldogs	OHL	34	10	23	33	30	—	—	—	—	—
2015–16	Mississauga Steelheads	OHL	27	10	8	18	22	7	2	3	5	0
2015–16	Toronto Marlies	AHL	3	0	0	0	0	—	—	—	—	—
2016–17	Toronto Marlies	AHL	9	1	0	1	6	—	—	—	—	—
2016–17	Orlando Solar Bears	ECHL	35	14	6	20	27	7	1	4	5	11
2017–18	Toronto Marlies	AHL	44	11	15	26	36	20	6	3	9	18
2018–19	Toronto Marlies	AHL	44	13	12	25	60	13	4	3	7	22
2019–20	Toronto Marlies	AHL	24	13	5	18	28	—	—	—	—	—
2019–20	Toronto Maple Leafs	NHL	4	0	1	1	0	—	—	—	—	—
2019–20	Springfield Thunderbirds	AHL	6	0	2	2	8	—	—	—	—	—
2020–21	Florida Panthers	NHL	33	2	8	10	18	6	2	0	2	8
2021–22	Florida Panthers	NHL	54	18	29	47	53	4	1	0	1	6
2022–23	Dallas Stars	NHL	68	12	19	31	80	18	4	2	6	18
2023–24	Dallas Stars	NHL	81	22	31	53	54	13	3	2	5	10
2024–25	Dallas Stars	NHL	62	22	25	47	53	18	1	4	5	18
2025–26	Seattle Kraken	NHL	29	4	9	13	26	—	—	—	—	—
2025–26	Columbus Blue Jackets	NHL	39	15	17	32	30	—	—	—	—	—
NHL totals			370	95	139	234	314	59	11	8	19	60

== Awards and honours ==
Award	Year	Ref
AHL
Calder Cup champion	2018	
