= Christian Dvorak =

American ice hockey player (born 1996)

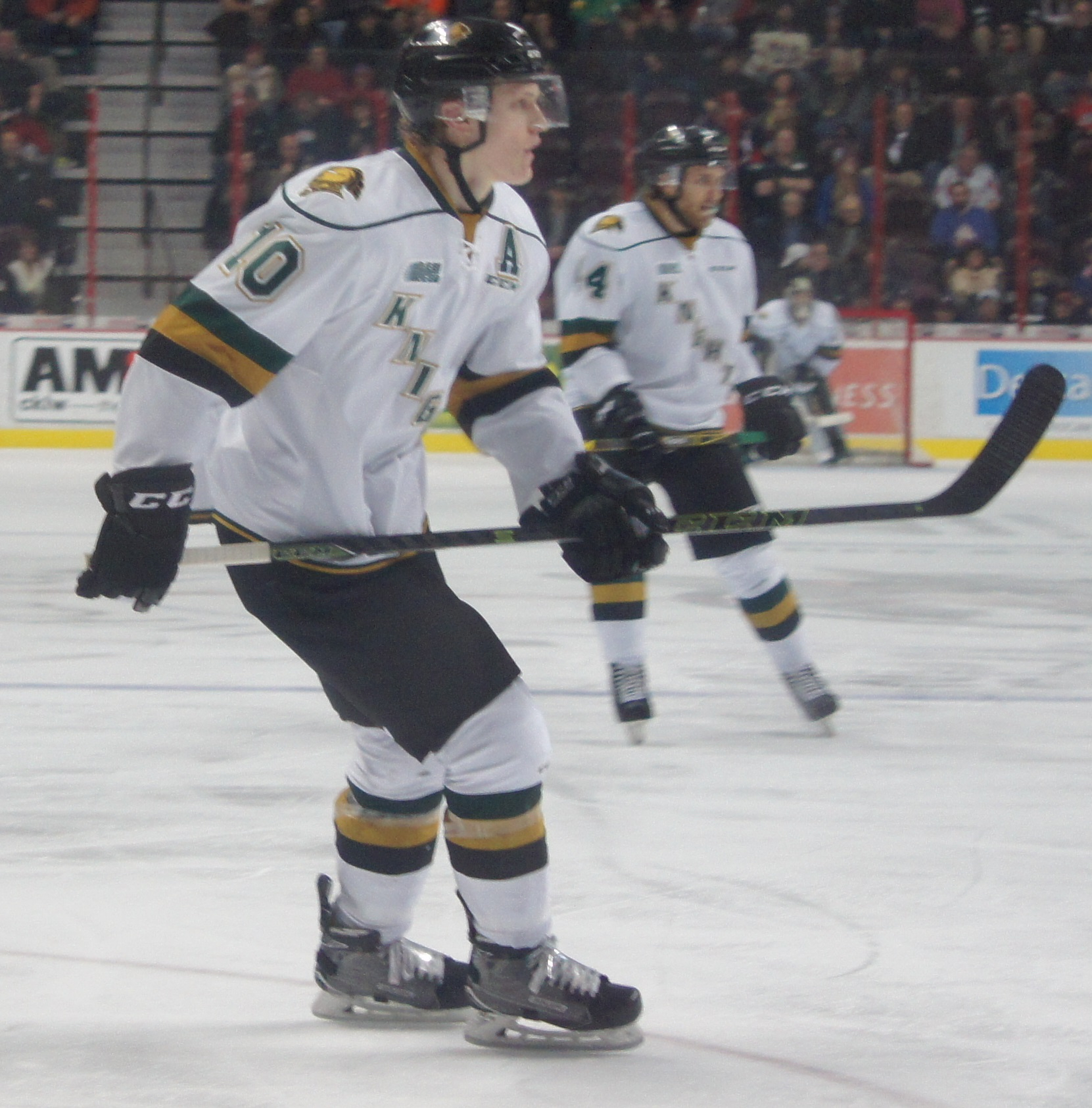
- Dvorak with the London Knights in 2016
- Born: February 2, 1996 (age 30) Palos, Illinois, U.S.
- Height: 6 ft 1 in (185 cm)
- Weight: 190 lb (86 kg; 13 st 8 lb)
- Position: Center
- Shoots: Left
- NHL team Former teams: Philadelphia Flyers; Arizona Coyotes; Montreal Canadiens
- National team: United States
- NHL draft: 58th overall, 2014; Arizona Coyotes
- Playing career: 2015–present

Christian Dvorak (born February 2, 1996) is an American professional ice hockey player who is a center for the Philadelphia Flyers of the National Hockey League (NHL). He was selected in the second round, 58th overall, by the Arizona Coyotes in the 2014 NHL entry draft. Dvorak has also previously played for the Montreal Canadiens.

== Playing career ==
=== Junior ===
Dvorak started his playing career with the Chicago Mission U16 and U18 teams. After his impressive seasons in Chicago, he was chosen sixth overall in the United States Hockey League (USHL) Futures Draft, as well as in the eighth round of the 2012 Ontario Hockey League (OHL) Priority Selection draft. He played the 2012–13 season with the Chicago Steel in the USHL, but decided the following year to move to Canada to join the London Knights of the OHL.

Following the 2013–14 season, he was selected in the second round of the annual NHL entry draft by the Arizona Coyotes, who also previously drafted his former Knights teammate Max Domi the year prior.

His rise to stardom began in the 2014–15 season, where he was second on the team with a staggering 109 points, only behind linemate Mitch Marner. On April 18, 2015, Dvorak signed his first professional contract, agreeing to a three-year, entry-level deal with the Arizona Coyotes. He was assigned on an amateur tryout (ATO) to make his professional debut with American Hockey League (AHL) affiliate, the Portland Pirates.

Dvorak was named co-captain of the Knights at the beginning of the 2015–16 season, sharing the honor with Marner. Throughout the season, Dvorak played on the top line alongside the foregoing as well as Matthew Tkachuk. Leading the team with 121 points, surpassing his previous best, he helped London capture the 2016 Memorial Cup at the ENMAX Centrium in Red Deer, Alberta to end his major junior career.

=== Professional ===
==== Arizona Coyotes (2016–2021) ====
On November 3, 2016, Dvorak scored his first NHL goal on goaltender Pekka Rinne to help clinch a win over the Nashville Predators. He also chipped in an assist on a goal scored by Anthony Duclair to tie the game, marking the first multi-point effort of Dvorak's NHL career.

On October 30, 2017, Dvorak scored his first goal of the 2017–18 season to help the Coyotes defeat the Philadelphia Flyers and avoid setting a new NHL record with a 12th-straight loss to start the season. In August 2018, he signed a six-year contract extension with the team.

Initially sidelined to begin the 2018–19 season due to a pectoral muscle injury, it was subsequently announced that Dvorak required surgery to repair same. Months later, after a brief conditioning stint with the AHL's Tucson Roadrunners, he made his season debut with Arizona on February 26, 2019. The following season, Dvorak would set career highs in both goals (18) as well as points (38).

==== Montreal Canadiens (2021–2025) ====
On September 4, 2021, Dvorak was traded by the Coyotes to the Montreal Canadiens in exchange for a 2022 first-round pick and a 2024 second-round pick. With the decision made by the Canadiens not to match an offer sheet tendered to 2018 third overall selection Jesperi Kotkaniemi, the team suddenly had a void to fill at the center position. Already subject to trade rumors for an extended period, Dvorak was seen as an ideal candidate to fill the positional in need. Dvorak made his debut for the Canadiens on September 27, 2021 in a pre-season game against the Toronto Maple Leafs, where he scored a goal and added three assists. The regular season began with major challenges for both Dvorak and the Canadiens, who experienced a historically bad season that led to much of the management brass being relieved of their duties. Dvorak was injured in January and missed two months of play, but saw his output improve on his return under new head coach Martin St. Louis. Collectively, he finished the season with a total of 11 goals and 22 assists in 56 games played.

After beginning the 2022–23 season with no points through his first seven games, team head coach Martin St. Louis spoke about Dvorak's line, remarking, "they have to continue doing what they're doing. All the statistics we have on their game, all the chances they produce, the way they defend, they're very good, they just haven't gotten the results." Two days later, on October 29, Dvorak scored his first career hat-trick in a 7–4 victory over the St. Louis Blues, notching two goals within minutes of the third period and adding an empty netter at the end of the game. Thereafter, he skated in his 400th career NHL game on January 12, 2023, and registered his 200th career NHL point exactly one month later, before sustaining a season-ending knee injury during a 4–3 shootout loss to the Carolina Hurricanes in early March.

On January 4, 2024, it was announced that Dvorak would miss the remainder of the 2023–24 season for yet another torn pectoral muscle, marking his second consecutive season-ending surgery after appearing in only 30 games during the course of the campaign. At the time of his injury, his faceoff percentage of 57.77% ranked eleventh across the entire NHL.

During the course of the 2024–25 season, Dvorak played in his 500th career NHL game on January 23, 2025 versus the Detroit Red Wings and would record his 100th career NHL goal on March 15 in a game against the Florida Panthers.

==== Philadelphia Flyers (2025–present) ====
Entering the offseason as an unrestricted free agent, Dvorak was signed to a one-year contract by the Philadelphia Flyers on July 1, 2025. In January 2026, he agreed to a five-year extension with the team.

== International play ==
Medal record

Representing United States

Men's ice hockey

World Junior Championships
Bronze medal – third place	2016 Finland	

Dvorak made his international debut as part of the United States national junior team for the 2016 World Junior Championships, winning a bronze medal. Collectively, he recorded eight points across seven tournament games.

In May 2017, Dvorak was named to the United States national senior team for the annual IIHF World Championships where his team ultimately finished in fifth place following a loss to Finland in the quarterfinals.

== Career statistics ==
=== Regular season and playoffs ===
			Regular season					Playoffs
Season	Team	League	GP	G	A	Pts	PIM	GP	G	A	Pts	PIM
2012–13	Chicago Mission	HPHL U18	31	19	33	52	4	—	—	—	—	—
2012–13	Chicago Steel	USHL	9	2	3	5	2	—	—	—	—	—
2013–14	London Knights	OHL	33	6	8	14	0	—	—	—	—	—
2014–15	London Knights	OHL	66	41	68	109	24	10	5	8	13	0
2014–15	Portland Pirates	AHL	2	1	1	2	4	5	0	1	1	0
2015–16	London Knights	OHL	59	52	69	121	27	18	14	21	35	4
2016–17	Arizona Coyotes	NHL	78	15	18	33	22	—	—	—	—	—
2017–18	Arizona Coyotes	NHL	78	15	22	37	22	—	—	—	—	—
2018–19	Tucson Roadrunners	AHL	2	0	0	0	0	—	—	—	—	—
2018–19	Arizona Coyotes	NHL	20	2	5	7	2	—	—	—	—	—
2019–20	Arizona Coyotes	NHL	70	18	20	38	12	9	2	1	3	0
2020–21	Arizona Coyotes	NHL	56	17	14	31	12	—	—	—	—	—
2021–22	Montreal Canadiens	NHL	56	11	22	33	24	—	—	—	—	—
2022–23	Montreal Canadiens	NHL	64	10	18	28	6	—	—	—	—	—
2023–24	Montreal Canadiens	NHL	30	5	4	9	4	—	—	—	—	—
2024–25	Montreal Canadiens	NHL	82	12	21	33	16	5	2	0	2	4
2025–26	Philadelphia Flyers	NHL	80	18	33	51	27	10	0	4	4	8
NHL totals			614	123	177	300	147	24	4	5	9	12

=== International ===
Year	Team	Event	Result	GP	G	A	Pts	PIM
2016	United States	WJC	3rd place, bronze medalist(s)	7	3	5	8	8
2017	United States	WC	5th	8	1	0	1	6
Junior totals				7	3	5	8	8
Senior totals				8	1	0	1	6

== Awards and honors ==
Award	Year	Ref
OHL
J. Ross Robertson Cup champion	2016	
First All-Star Team	2016	
CHL
Memorial Cup champion	2016	
Memorial Cup All-Star Team	2016	
