= Max Wanner =

Canadian ice hockey player (born 2003)

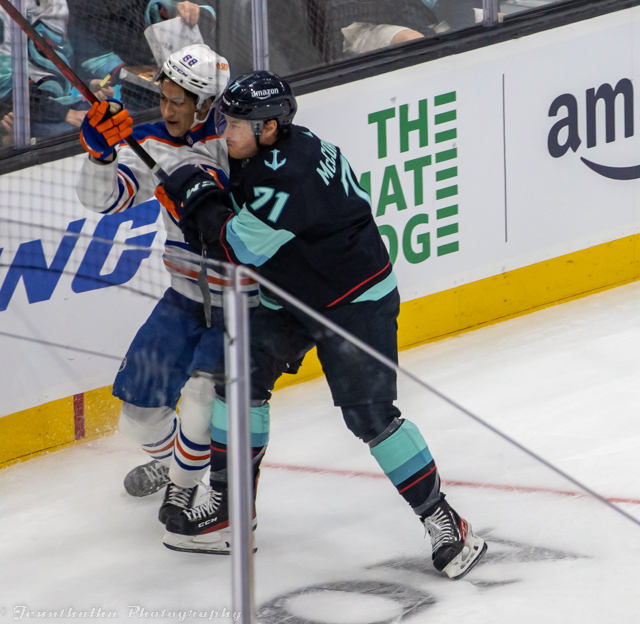
- Wanner (pictured left) in a preseason game with the Edmonton Oilers in 2022
- Born: March 12, 2003 (age 23) Estevan, Saskatchewan, Canada
- Height: 6 ft 3 in (191 cm)
- Weight: 185 lb (84 kg; 13 st 3 lb)
- Position: Defence
- Shoots: Right
- AHL team (P) Cur. team Former teams: Providence Bruins; Maine Mariners (ECHL); Bakersfield Condors
- NHL draft: 212th overall, 2021; Edmonton Oilers
- Playing career: 2023–present

Maximus Wanner (born March 12, 2003) is a Canadian professional ice hockey defenceman who currently plays for the Maine Mariners in the ECHL while under contract to the Providence Bruins of the American Hockey League (AHL).

== Playing career ==
=== Amateur ===
Starting in the 2019–20 season, Wanner played for the Moose Jaw Warriors of the Western Hockey League (WHL). Wanner saw limited action over the next two seasons due to both injury and a shortened season due to the COVID-19 pandemic. Despite the adversity, Wanner was drafted by the Edmonton Oilers in the seventh round of the 2021 NHL entry draft, 212th overall.

Over the next two seasons, he put up solid offensive numbers while serving as a presence on the Warriors blue line. He ended up scoring 53 points in 99 regular season games, and 14 points in 19 playoff games, although the Warriors would not make it out of the second round in either playoff.

During the 2022–23 season, Wanner was suspended 17 games by the WHL for an off-ice incident. Details of the incident were not made public, but it was deemed that the incident was non-criminal.

=== Professional ===
==== Edmonton Oilers ====
Wanner signed a three-year, entry level contract with the Edmonton Oilers on September 30, 2022. Although he would stay in the WHL for the following season, afterwards, he would join the American Hockey League (AHL) affiliate of the Oilers, the Bakersfield Condors.

In his first professional season, Wanner scored 17 points in 68 games, exceeding typical expectations of a seventh round pick. Entering the following season, many scouts and reporters saw Wanner as a player that could defy the odds and have an impact at the NHL level despite his low draft status. Unfortunately, early in the season, Wanner took a puck to the head, resulting in him missing 16 games due to injury.

==== Boston Bruins ====
On March 4, 2025, Wanner was involved in a three-team deal that involved him, a second-round pick in the 2025 NHL entry draft, and a fourth-round pick in the 2026 draft, to the Boston Bruins in exchange for Trent Frederic and Max Jones. At the time, Wanner had scored just a goal and an assist in 22 games with the Condors. Wanner reported to the Bruins AHL affiliate, the Providence Bruins. Unfortunately, he would be unable to produce much more offense in Providence, registering just three assists in 15 games, and being a healthy scratch for all of the Bruins playoff games.

Wanner would spend most of the 2025–26 season with Providence, although he also had a short stint with their ECHL affiliate, the Maine Mariners. Wanner would play 29 games with the P-Bruins, scoring a goal and two assists, and going scoreless in four playoff games.

After the season, the Bruins announced they would not extend a qualifying offer to Wanner, making him an unrestricted free agent. On July 5, 2026, the Providence Bruins announced that they had signed Wanner to a one-year, AHL contract.

== Career statistics ==
			Regular season					Playoffs
Season	Team	League	GP	G	A	Pts	PIM	GP	G	A	Pts	PIM
2019-20	Estevan Bruins	SJHL	2	0	0	0	0	—	—	—	—	—
2019–20	Moose Jaw Warriors	WHL	5	0	1	1	0	—	—	—	—	—
2020–21	Moose Jaw Warriors	WHL	17	0	4	4	12	—	—	—	—	—
2021–22	Moose Jaw Warriors	WHL	55	6	17	23	53	9	3	4	7	10
2022–23	Moose Jaw Warriors	WHL	44	8	22	30	45	10	2	5	7	17
2023–24	Bakersfield Condors	AHL	68	7	10	17	37	2	0	0	0	7
2024–25	Bakersfield Condors	AHL	22	1	1	2	28	—	—	—	—	—
2024–25	Providence Bruins	AHL	15	0	3	3	7	—	—	—	—	—
2025–26	Maine Mariners	ECHL	3	1	0	1	2	—	—	—	—	—
2025–26	Providence Bruins	AHL	29	1	2	3	11	4	0	0	0	0
AHL totals			134	9	16	25	83	6	0	0	0	7
