= Mitch Marner =

Canadian ice hockey player (born 1997)

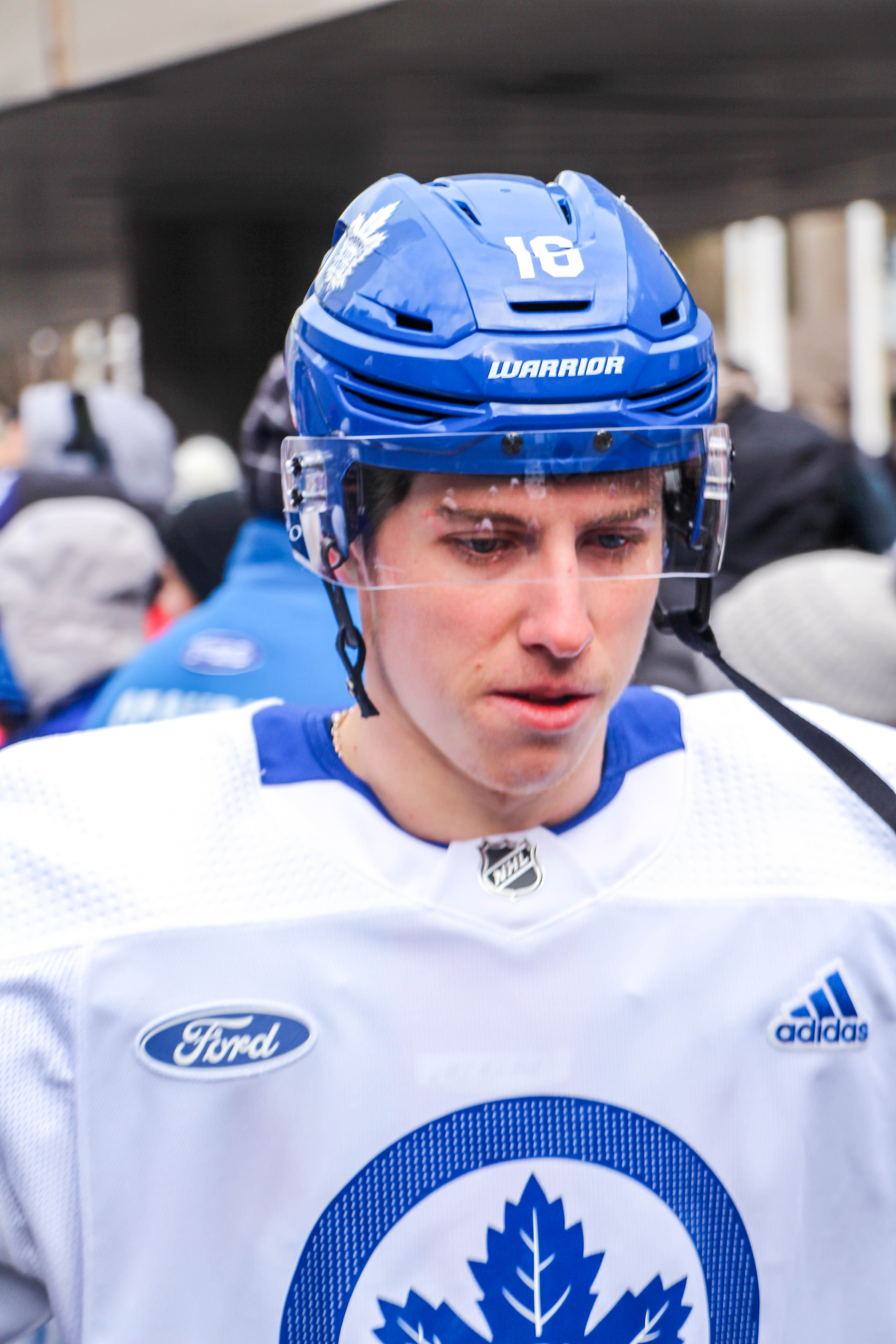
- Marner with the Toronto Maple Leafs in 2020
- Born: May 5, 1997 (age 29) Markham, Ontario, Canada
- Height: 6 ft 0 in (183 cm)
- Weight: 180 lb (82 kg; 12 st 12 lb)
- Position: Right wing
- Shoots: Right
- NHL team Former teams: Vegas Golden Knights; Toronto Maple Leafs
- National team: Canada
- NHL draft: 4th overall, 2015; Toronto Maple Leafs
- Playing career: 2016–present

Mitchell Daniel Marner (born May 5, 1997) is a Canadian professional ice hockey player who is a right winger for the Vegas Golden Knights of the National Hockey League (NHL). He was selected fourth overall by the Toronto Maple Leafs in the 2015 NHL entry draft.

== Early life ==
Marner was born in Markham, Ontario, and spent the majority of his life in the neighbourhood of Thornhill. His parents are Paul and Bonnie Marner, and he has a brother, Christopher, who is four years older.

Marner attended Hill Academy, a private school focused on athletics, located in Vaughan. He would later go to Blyth Academy.

Growing up, Marner was a fan of the Toronto Maple Leafs, the team that eventually drafted him.

== Playing career ==
=== Minor ===
While Marner was growing up, he began developing his on ice skills with 3 Zones Hockey School. He attended The Hill Academy in Vaughan, Ontario, and then Blyth Academy.

Marner played his minor career in the Durham Region and the Greater Toronto Hockey League (GTHL). He played in the 2011–12 season with the Vaughan Kings and went on to win a GTHL title.

For the 2012–13 season, Marner transitioned to the Don Mills Flyers of the GTHL, where he played his minor midget year, registering 86 points in 55 games. He finished second in scoring in the GTHL behind Dylan Strome (who was then playing with the Toronto Marlboros). At the end of his season with the Flyers, Marner was immediately invited to join the St. Michael's Buzzers of the Ontario Junior A Hockey League, where he went on to win a championship.

During his minor midget season, Marner was initially unsure of his plans for the following season. He received a scholarship offer from the University of Michigan to play for the Wolverines ice hockey team, while also being drafted by the London Knights in the first round of the 2013 OHL Priority Selection, 19th overall.

=== Major junior ===
Despite receiving a scholarship offer from the University of Michigan, Marner elected to sign with the London Knights, who selected him with their first round pick in the 2013 Priority Selection.

Marner had a strong rookie season with the Knights, registering 59 points in 64 games and was the runner-up for the OHL Rookie of the Year, behind Travis Konecny.

During the 2014–15 season, Marner played superbly alongside linemate Max Domi. As the season progressed, Marner was consistently included as one of the top prospects in the 2015 NHL entry draft, being listed as a definite top ten pick, if not top five. He led the league in scoring for most of the season until Dylan Strome of the Erie Otters recorded six points in the final game of the season, bumping Marner to second. As reward for his outstanding sophomore season, Marner was named to the Ontario Hockey League (OHL) First All-Star team and awarded the Jim Mahon Memorial Trophy as the OHL's highest scoring right wing player. Marner was selected fourth overall by the hometown Toronto Maple Leafs in the 2015 draft.

On July 28, 2015, the Leafs signed Marner to a three-year, entry-level contract.

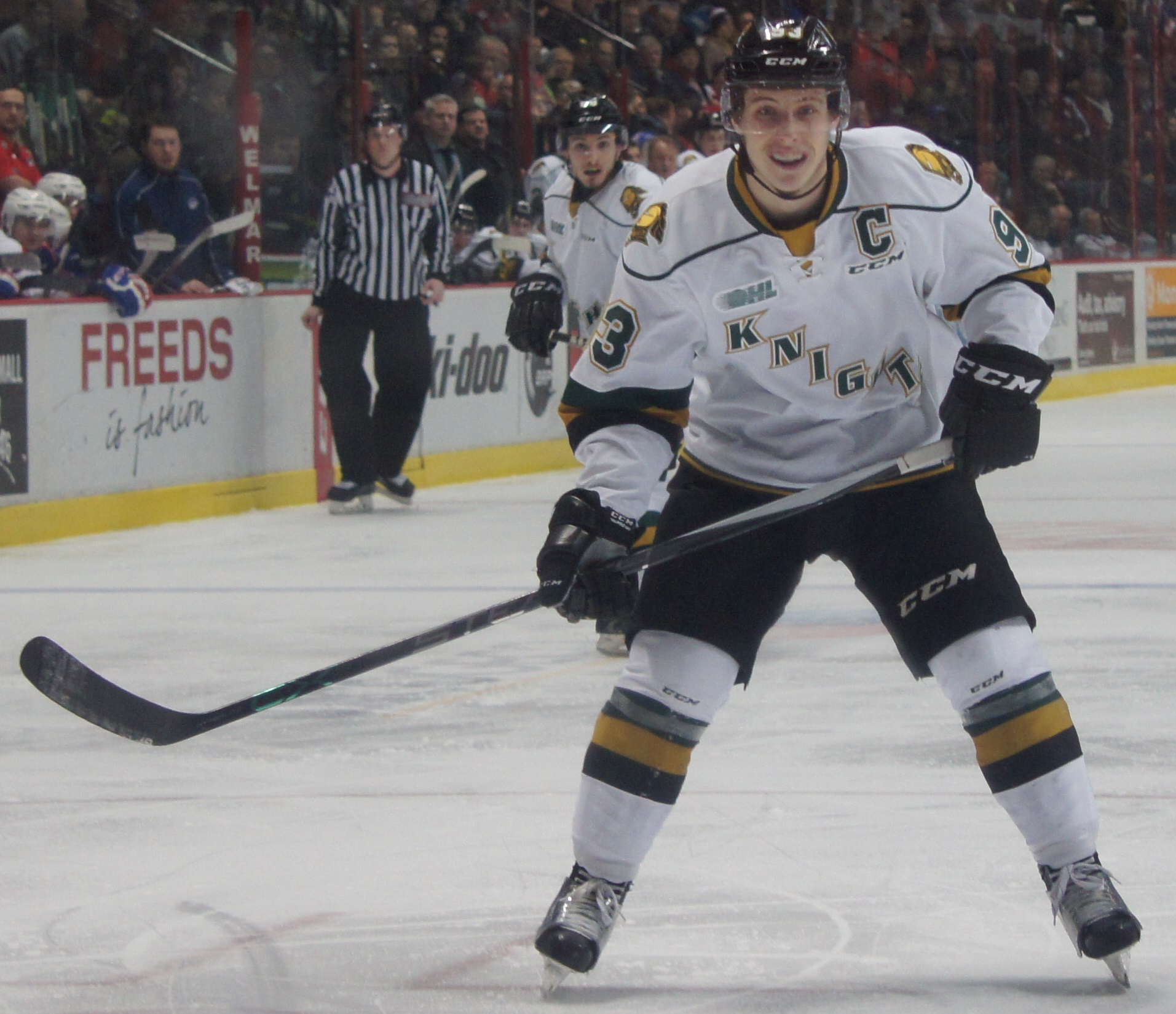
Marner with the London Knights in January 2016

On October 1, 2015, Marner was named as co-captain of the Knights along with teammate Christian Dvorak. Marner played most of the season at right wing on a line with Dvorak and Matthew Tkachuk. The trio was a dominant force and the Knights ended the regular season as the highest scoring team in the OHL. Marner himself finished the regular season second in OHL scoring with 116 points in 57 games and was awarded the Red Tilson Trophy as the OHL's most outstanding player of the year.

Marner played an important role during the Knights' 2016 playoff run, resulting in the team winning the OHL championship. He led the playoffs in scoring and with 44 points in 18 games and was awarded the Wayne Gretzky 99 Award as playoff MVP.

Marner helped lead the Knights in winning the 2016 Memorial Cup. He won both the Stafford Smythe Memorial Trophy and the Ed Chynoweth Trophy as tournament MVP and leading scorer.

Marner was the second player (after Brad Richards in 2000) ever to win a Memorial Cup, a Stafford Smythe Memorial Trophy, CHL Player of the Year, a league MVP trophy (Red Tilson Trophy) and a league playoff MVP trophy (Wayne Gretzky 99 Award) in the same season.

=== Toronto Maple Leafs ===
==== 2016–17 ====
After an impressive training camp and pre-season (in which he led the team with four assists), it was announced that Marner would remain on the Toronto Maple Leafs roster for the upcoming 2016–17 season. He made his NHL debut in the team's season opener on October 12. Despite an effective first game with six shots on goal, he was overshadowed by a historic four-goal debut from teammate Auston Matthews. The next game on his first night playing in Hockey Night in Canada, Marner scored his first NHL goal after receiving a pass between his legs. He recorded his first career assist four days later.

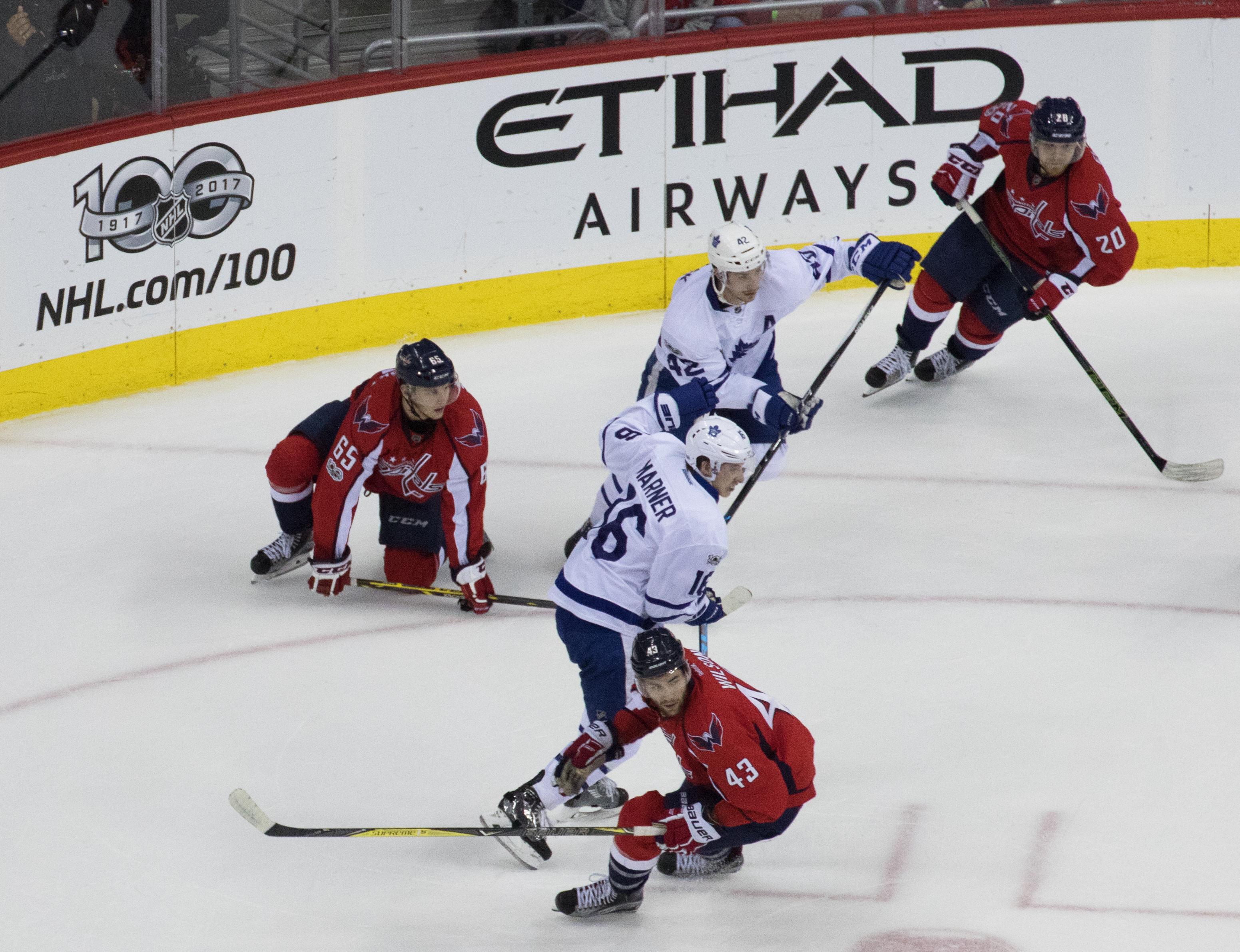
Marner with the Toronto Maple Leafs during the 2017 Stanley Cup playoffs

On October 27, 2016, in a game against the Florida Panthers, Marner had his first multi-point game, accumulating three assists to lead the Leafs to a 4–2 win. Marner had his first multi-goal game against the Buffalo Sabres on November 3, 2016, as the Leafs won 2–1. On November 15, 2016, Marner had three points in a 6–2 win over the Nashville Predators, which at the time tied him in the lead for Leafs' leading scorer (with James van Riemsdyk) for the first time of his career.

Marner was named the NHL's Rookie of the Month for January 2017 after leading all rookies with 11 assists and 15 points in 13 games. He also led all rookies with eight power-play points and matched a career-high three point game. Marner was the third Leaf to be named Rookie of the Month during the 2016–17 season, making the Maple Leafs the first NHL team with three different Rookie of the Month honorees in one campaign.

Marner also set the Maple Leafs record for most assists in a season by a rookie with 42 on the year. This broke the previous record which was held for 73 years by Gus Bodnar, who had 40 assists in the 1943–44 season. Marner spent the entire season on a line with Van Riemsdyk and Tyler Bozak, finding offensive chemistry with the two veterans, and managed to finish the year with 61 points. The trio of Marner, William Nylander, and Auston Matthews became only the second team since the 1981 Quebec Nordiques to have three rookies finish with at least 60 points. His play assisted the team in qualifying for the 2017 Stanley Cup playoffs, where he scored his first playoff goal on his first shift of game 1. Marner recorded four points in the series but it was not enough as the team lost in six games against the top-seeded Washington Capitals.

==== 2017–18 ====
On December 19, 2017, during the Maple Leafs' Next Century Game, Marner broke a 15-game goal drought and recorded a four-point game, the first time in his career. He scored one goal and three assists to help defeat the Carolina Hurricanes 8–1. On February 10, 2018, Marner scored his first five-point game (two goals and three assists), becoming the first Leafs player to record five points in a game since Tomáš Kaberle in 2009. Marner ended the regular season leading the Leafs in assists and points, and setting career highs in goals, assists and points. His offensive play helped the Leafs to their second consecutive Stanley Cup playoffs appearance. During the 2018 Stanley Cup playoffs, Marner became the first Maple Leafs player since Brian Leetch to have a five-game point streak in the Stanley Cup playoffs. He led the Leafs in playoff scoring with nine points but the Maple Leafs were eliminated by the Boston Bruins in seven games during the first round.

==== 2018–19 ====
On October 9, 2018, Marner recorded a four-point game (one goal and three assists) in a 7–4 win over the Dallas Stars. On October 27, Marner recorded his 100th career assist on a game-tying goal by Jake Gardiner against the Winnipeg Jets to help the Leafs win 3–2. In the last 20 years, only Mario Lemieux recorded more primary assists in his first 24 games of the season than Marner, who recorded 22 primary assists in his first 24 games. On January 3, Marner tied a Maple Leaf record for fastest goal to start a game by scoring seven seconds into a game against the Minnesota Wild. Marner scored again within the same period but the Leafs lost 4–3 to the Wild. On January 17, 2019, Marner recorded a goal during a 4–2 win over the league-leading Tampa Bay Lightning, becoming the first player in Maple Leafs franchise history to begin his NHL career with three consecutive 60-point seasons. On February 23, during a 5–3 win over the rival Montreal Canadiens, Marner recorded two assists to record the 200th point of his NHL career. He finished the regular season leading the team in scoring and third in the NHL with assists with career-highs of 26 goals, 68 assists and 94 points, becoming the first Maple Leaf to record at least 90 points in a season since Mats Sundin in 1996–97.

==== 2019–20 ====
On September 13, 2019, Marner signed a six-year, $65.358 million contract with the Maple Leafs. At the start of the 2019–20 season, Marner was named an alternate captain for the team. On November 9, 2019, during a game against the Philadelphia Flyers, Marner fell awkwardly onto his leg and was expected to miss a minimum 4 weeks due to an ankle injury. He played strongly in his return on December 4 in a loss against the Colorado Avalanche. On December 23, 2019, Marner recorded his 2nd career five-point game (two goals and three assists) in thrilling 8–6 win over the Carolina Hurricanes at the Leafs 3rd annual Next Generation Game. Down 6–4 in the 3rd period, Marner sparked the Leafs comeback when he one-timed a spinning cross-ice pass from Auston Matthews to cut the Hurricanes lead. Mitch then set up Tyson Barrie for the game tying goal 53 seconds later. Just 6 seconds after tying, Marner stole the puck and scored the game-winning breakaway goal. Mitch had recorded the Leafs' previous five-point game on February 10, 2018. On January 11, 2020, he was selected to participate in the NHL All-Star Game for the first time in his career. On February 7, 2020, Marner recorded his 200th NHL assist on a late overtime goal scored by John Tavares in a 5–4 win over the Anaheim Ducks.

The regular season ended abruptly due to the onset of the COVID-19 pandemic. Months later, the NHL arranged to hold the 2020 Stanley Cup playoffs in a bubble, with Eastern Conference games held in Toronto. The Maple Leafs faced the Columbus Blue Jackets in the qualifying round, and lost 3–2. Marner managed only four assists in five games, attracting criticism from fans and commentators for his lack of playoff production.

==== 2020–21 ====
Due to the COVID-19 pandemic and resultant limitations on cross-border travel, the 2020–21 NHL season occurred under a vastly different arrangement than previously, with the Leafs grouped in an all-Canadian North Division and playing exclusively within that division for the regular season. On April 15, 2021, Marner became the fourth player in Maple Leafs history to record at least five consecutive seasons with 40 assists. The Maple Leafs finished first in the North Division, and faced the Montreal Canadiens in the first round of the 2021 Stanley Cup playoffs, where they were considered the heavy favourites to win, which would have been the team's first playoff series win since 2004. The Leafs lost the first game of the series, but won the next three to take a seeming stranglehold. However, they went on to lose the next three games and the series 4–3, the team's fifth-straight early exit. Marner again scored only four assists in the postseason, this time in seven games, further amplifying criticism of his perceived underperformance. At the end of the year, Marner was named to the NHL First All-Star Team on right wing, the first time a Maple Leafs player was named to the NHL's First All-Star team since Börje Salming in 1977.

==== 2021–22 ====
With the restoration of the traditional season, Marner enjoyed another highly successful regular season, recording 35 goals and 62 assists in 72 games. Marner, Matthews and newcomer Michael Bunting formed one of the most successful forward lines in the league for much of the year. On February 26, 2022, Marner recorded a career high four goals and six points to help the Toronto Maple Leafs to a 10-7 win over the Detroit Red Wings. It was the first NHL hat-trick and four-goal game in his career. After recording a natural hat-trick in the second period, Marner capped off his night by scoring the Leafs' tenth goal, his fourth of the game, on a Michael Bunting breakaway drop-pass that Marner started deploying that season. The last time the Maple Leafs recorded 10 goals in a game was a 10–2 victory on Jan. 4, 2007 over the Boston Bruins. Having accrued 97 points, Marner hoped to become only the fourth Maple Leaf player to break the 100-point barrier, but coach Sheldon Keefe opted to sit him out of the final game of the season to prepare for the playoffs. Marner admitted it was "definitely tough," but said that "at the same time, I want to just make sure I'm ready to go." At the end of the year, Marner was again named to the NHL First All-Star team as the league's best right winger, joining teammate Auston Matthews on the first team.

Advancing into the Stanley Cup playoffs, Marner and the Maple Leafs drew the Tampa Bay Lightning, two-time defending champions, in the first round. Marner had not scored a goal in 18 playoff games prior to the beginning of the series, and in light of disappointing results against both the Blue Jackets and the Canadiens, how he would perform against the Lightning was subject to considerable speculation. In game 1 of the series against the Lightning, Marner scored his first playoff goal since April 11, 2019, as part of a 5–0 Leafs victory. He had two assists as well, nearly equaling his totals from each of the previous two playoff series in a single game. Marner would go on to make a strong contribution in the remainder of the series, but the Leafs failed to make it past the first round yet again, marking the franchise's eighth consecutive playoff series loss.

==== 2022–23 ====
The 2022–23 regular season was another period of success for Marner, who led the team in scoring while Matthews had a somewhat down year by his former standards. Notably, Marner recorded a franchise-best 23-game point streak, with 11 goals and 21 assists in that span. He was one of only twelve players in NHL history to record a streak of at least that many games, noting that it was "a cool accomplishment to have your name with some great legends." He was widely cited as the team's most valuable player for the season. Marner was again in the hunt for the 100-point threshold, but for the second consecutive year Keefe opted to scratch him from games late in the season for load management reasons, and he concluded the season with 99 points in 80 games, one shy of 100. He was subsequently named a finalist for the Frank J. Selke Trophy, given to the best defensive forward of the year.

The Maple Leafs finished fourth in the league in the regular season, and second in the Atlantic Division, setting up a second consecutive first-round meeting with the Tampa Bay Lightning. While the Leafs were generally identified as the favourites going into the series, the long history of failure to advance past the first round was widely acknowledged. Many suggested that the outcome of the series would have major ramifications for the team going forward, including the status of both general manager Kyle Dubas and head coach Keefe, and also for the prospect of Matthews re-signing in Toronto, which he would become eligible to do in the summer. Marner distinguished himself during the Leafs' battle with the Lightning, posting a team-leading eleven points over six games while the Leafs won their first playoff series since 2004.

==== 2023–24 ====
On November 30, 2023 Marner recorded his second career hat trick after having to get stitches on his face the game before.

After putting up 76 points in the 2023–24 season Marner suffered a high ankle sprain in a March 7 game against the Boston Bruins. He returned late in the season, scoring a total of 85 points in 69 games.

==== 2024–25: Final season with Maple Leafs ====
Playing the Detroit Red Wings on December 27, 2024, Marner recorded his third career hat-trick.

During a game against the Boston Bruins on January 4, 2025, Marner factored on a game-opening goal for the 112th time in his career, surpassing former captain Doug Gilmour and tying Börje Salming for the fifth most by a player in Maple Leafs history. On March 7, 2025 Maple Leafs general manager Brad Treliving requested Marner waive his no trade clause for a potential trade to the Carolina Hurricanes in exchange for Mikko Rantanen, to which Marner denied the request and opted instead to remain in Toronto.

After eliminating the Ottawa Senators in the first round of the playoffs, the Maple Leafs faced the defending Stanley Cup champions in the second round. In game 6, Marner intercepted the puck and assisted Auston Matthews on the game winning goal to win 2–0 against the defending Stanley Cup champions the Florida Panthers.

The goal forced the series to a seventh game which they lost 6–1, which finished Marner's final season under contract with the Maple Leafs with two goals and 11 assists in 13 playoff games. Marner had a primary point on every Leafs game-winning goal in the series.

=== Vegas Golden Knights ===
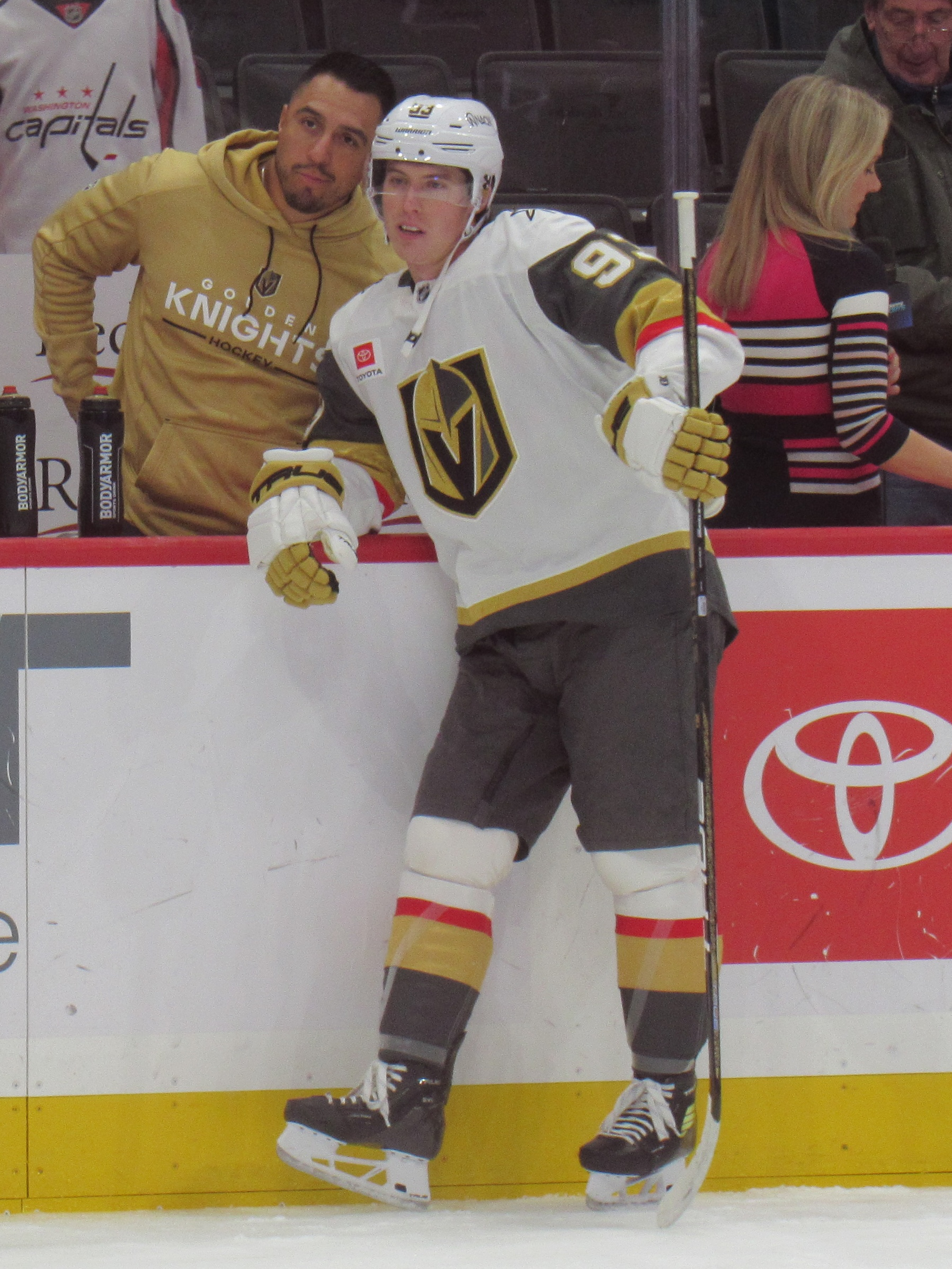
Marner with the Golden Knights in 2026

On June 30, having completed the final year of his contract with the Maple Leafs, Marner was a part of a sign-and-trade deal hours before the opening of free agency. He was signed to an eight-year, $96 million contract with Toronto and immediately traded to the Vegas Golden Knights in exchange for Nicolas Roy. Marner returned to wearing number 93, which he had previously worn with the London Knights; number 93 had been retired by the Maple Leafs in honour of Doug Gilmour.

On April 2, 2026, Marner recorded his first hat-trick as a Golden Knight and the fourth of his career, contributing three goals and two assists in a 6–3 win over the Calgary Flames.

On May 8, 2026, Marner recorded his first playoff hat-trick of his career, contributing three goals and an assist in a 6–2 win over the Anaheim Ducks. During Game 3 of the 2026 Stanley Cup Final, Marner recorded his second hat trick of the playoffs, and the fastest hat trick in Cup Final history, giving Vegas a 4–0 lead. Marner's three goals in six minutes and ten seconds was 11 seconds fewer then the prior record, recorded in Game 1 of the 1957 Cup finals by Maurice "Rocket" Richard of the Montreal Canadiens against the Boston Bruins.

== International play ==
Medal record

Men's ice hockey

Representing Canada

Olympic Games
Silver medal – second place	2026 Milano Cortina	

World Championships
Silver medal – second place	2017 Germany/France	

4 Nations Face-Off
Winner	2025 Canada/United States	

Ivan Hlinka Memorial Tournament
Gold medal – first place	2014 Czech Republic	

Marner made his international debut for Canada at the 2014 Ivan Hlinka Memorial Tournament, where he won a gold medal. He tied Mathew Barzal for the leading scorer from Canada at the tournament.

At the 2016 World Junior Championships, Marner and Dylan Strome each scored four goals and two assists in five games to lead Canada in scoring. Canada reached the quarterfinals but was eliminated by hosts Finland. Marner scored twice in the game, both times to bring Canada back to an even score, but it was not enough to overcome the eventual gold medalists.

Marner made his Canada senior team debut at the 2017 World Championship, where team Canada won silver. Scoring 12 points in 10 games, Marner was placed in the top ten in scoring and was only second to Nathan MacKinnon in team scoring.

In 2025, Marner played for Canada at the 4 Nations Face-Off. He recorded one goal and had two assists across four games in the tournament, including the primary assist on Connor McDavid's game-winning overtime goal in the tournament final.

On December 31, 2025, Marner was named to Canada's roster for the 2026 Winter Olympics. In the tournament quarterfinals against Czechia, he scored the game-winning goal in overtime, allowing Canada to reach the semifinals.

== Personal life ==
In July, 2020, Marner became part owner of OverActive Media, an esports company with Call of Duty and Overwatch teams based in Toronto.

On July 29, 2023, Marner married his long-time girlfriend Stephanie LaChance at Peller Estates Winery in Niagara-on-the-Lake. The wedding was attended by several of his current and former teammates.

In February 2025, it was announced that the couple were expecting their first child, a boy who was born on May 4, 2025. Marner consequently missed that day’s practice.

== Career statistics ==
=== Regular season and playoffs ===
Bold indicates led league

			Regular season					Playoffs
Season	Team	League	GP	G	A	Pts	PIM	GP	G	A	Pts	PIM
2012–13	Don Mills Flyers	GTHL	55	41	45	86	38	—	—	—	—	—
2012–13	St. Michael's Buzzers	OJHL	6	1	3	4	0	14	3	1	4	0
2013–14	London Knights	OHL	68	17	46	59	28	9	3	6	9	4
2014–15	London Knights	OHL	63	44	82	126	56	7	9	7	16	8
2015–16	London Knights	OHL	57	39	77	116	73	18	16	28	44	8
2016–17	Toronto Maple Leafs	NHL	77	19	42	61	38	6	1	3	4	0
2017–18	Toronto Maple Leafs	NHL	82	22	47	69	26	7	2	7	9	4
2018–19	Toronto Maple Leafs	NHL	82	26	68	94	22	7	2	2	4	2
2019–20	Toronto Maple Leafs	NHL	59	16	51	67	16	5	0	4	4	2
2020–21	Toronto Maple Leafs	NHL	55	20	47	67	20	7	0	4	4	4
2021–22	Toronto Maple Leafs	NHL	72	35	62	97	16	7	2	6	8	2
2022–23	Toronto Maple Leafs	NHL	80	30	69	99	28	11	3	11	14	2
2023–24	Toronto Maple Leafs	NHL	69	26	59	85	18	7	1	2	3	2
2024–25	Toronto Maple Leafs	NHL	81	27	75	102	14	13	2	11	13	2
2025–26	Vegas Golden Knights	NHL	81	24	56	80	24	22	10	19	**29**	6
NHL totals			738	245	576	821	222	92	23	69	92	26

=== International ===
Year	Team	Event	Result	GP	G	A	Pts	PIM
2014	Canada Ontario	U17	5th	5	6	3	9	2
2014	Canada	IH18	1st place, gold medalist(s)	5	2	5	7	6
2016	Canada	WJC	6th	5	4	2	6	4
2017	Canada	WC	2nd place, silver medalist(s)	10	4	8	12	8
2025	Canada	4NF	1st place, gold medalist(s)	4	1	2	3	0
2026	Canada	OG	2nd place, silver medalist(s)	6	1	4	5	0
Junior totals				15	12	10	22	12
Senior totals				20	6	14	20	8

== Awards and honours ==
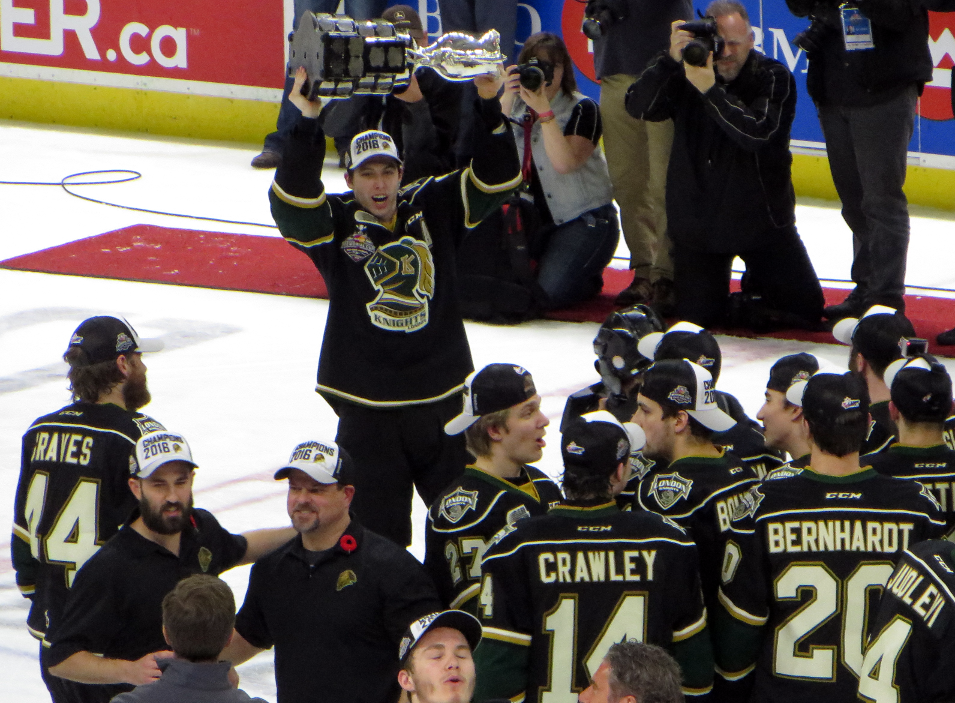
Marner lifts the Memorial Cup over his head after the London Knights win the 2016 Memorial Cup

Award	Year	Ref
OHL
Second All-Rookie Team	2014	
OHL All-Star	2015, 2016	
First All-Star Team	2015, 2016	
Jim Mahon Memorial Trophy	2015	
Red Tilson Trophy	2016	
J. Ross Robertson Cup champion	2016	
Wayne Gretzky 99 Award	2016	
CHL
CHL Top Prospects Game	2015	
CHL Player of the Year	2016	
Memorial Cup champion	2016	
Memorial Cup All-Star team	2016	
Stafford Smythe Memorial Trophy	2016	
Ed Chynoweth Trophy	2016	
NHL
NHL Rookie of the Month	January 2017	
NHL All-Rookie Team	2017	
NHL All-Star Game	2020, 2023, 2024	
NHL First All-Star Team	2021, 2022	

== Filmography ==
Year	Title	Notes	Ref.
2020	Justin Bieber: Seasons	Guest Appearance	
2021	All or Nothing: Toronto Maple Leafs	Self	

Awards and achievements
Preceded by William Nylander	Toronto Maple Leafs first-round draft pick 2015	Succeeded by Auston Matthews
