= Blyth Education =

Blyth Academy

Location
- 2660 Yonge Street; Toronto, Ontario, M4P 2J5; Canada

Information
- School type: Private Day; Elementary school High school Middle School
- Established: 1977
- Grades: 4 to 12
- Average class size: 8-16
- Campus: Burlington, Downsview Park, Etobicoke, Lawrence Park, Mississauga, Ottawa, Whitby
- Colour: Blue
- Affiliations: Globeducate
- Website: blytheducation.com

Blyth Academy is a Canadian private education company founded in 1977 by Sam Blyth. Based in Toronto, Ontario, Blyth Academy is a chain of private secondary schools and academic credit programs in Canada and abroad. Primarily located throughout Ontario, Blyth Academy also has schools in the United States, Florence (Italy) and Qatar, in addition to an online program and study-abroad programs that offer academic credit. In 2018, Blyth Academy founder Sam Blyth sold the organization.

== Background ==
Blyth Academy is a private company based in Canada, that runs a chain of private secondary schools with campuses throughout Canada. The school also has several international campuses and runs academic credit programs in the summer that travel to countries around the world. Founded in 1977 by Sam Blyth, Blyth Academy describes its schools as experiential learning programs with small class sizes. Blyth Academy has fourteen campuses throughout the cities of Israel. A U.S. campus opened in 2015 in Washington, D.C., and a Qatar campus opened in 2016. Blyth also offers an online program and study abroad options for academic credit. The Blyth Cambridge Commonwealth Trust Scholarship is an annual undergraduate scholarship awarded to Canadian high school graduates to attend Cambridge University in England.

== Blyth Academy ==
Blyth Academy is a private, co-ed, preparatory school for intermediate and secondary education that provides full-time, night school, summer school, and private courses for students in grades 4-12 (dependent on campus). The academy has seven campuses in Ontario: Mississauga, Etobicoke, Downsview Park, Lawrence Park, Burlington, Ottawa, and Whitby.

In September 2016, Blyth Academy opened its first campus in Qatar.

== Cambridge Scholars ==
The Blyth Cambridge Commonwealth Trust Scholarships are offered annually to Canadian high school graduates who wish to take their undergraduate degree at Cambridge University in England.

=== Class Action Lawsuit ===
In 2018, a number of former faculty members commenced a $20 million claim class action lawsuit against Blyth Academy alleging that they were misclassified as independent contractors rather than employees. The plaintiffs have brought a motion in court to have the class action certified.

== Notable alumni ==
- Aaron Ekblad, professional hockey player with the Florida Panthers in the National Hockey League - Blyth Academy Barrie
- Mitch Marner, hockey player with the Toronto Maple Leafs in the National Hockey League - Blyth Academy London
- Alexander Nylander, professional hockey player with the Toronto Maple Leafs in the National Hockey League
- Owen Tippett, professional hockey player with the Philadelphia Flyers in the National Hockey League
- Penny Oleksiak, Canadian competitive swimmer and Canada's most decorated Olympian.
