= Max Jones (ice hockey) =

American ice hockey player (born 1998)

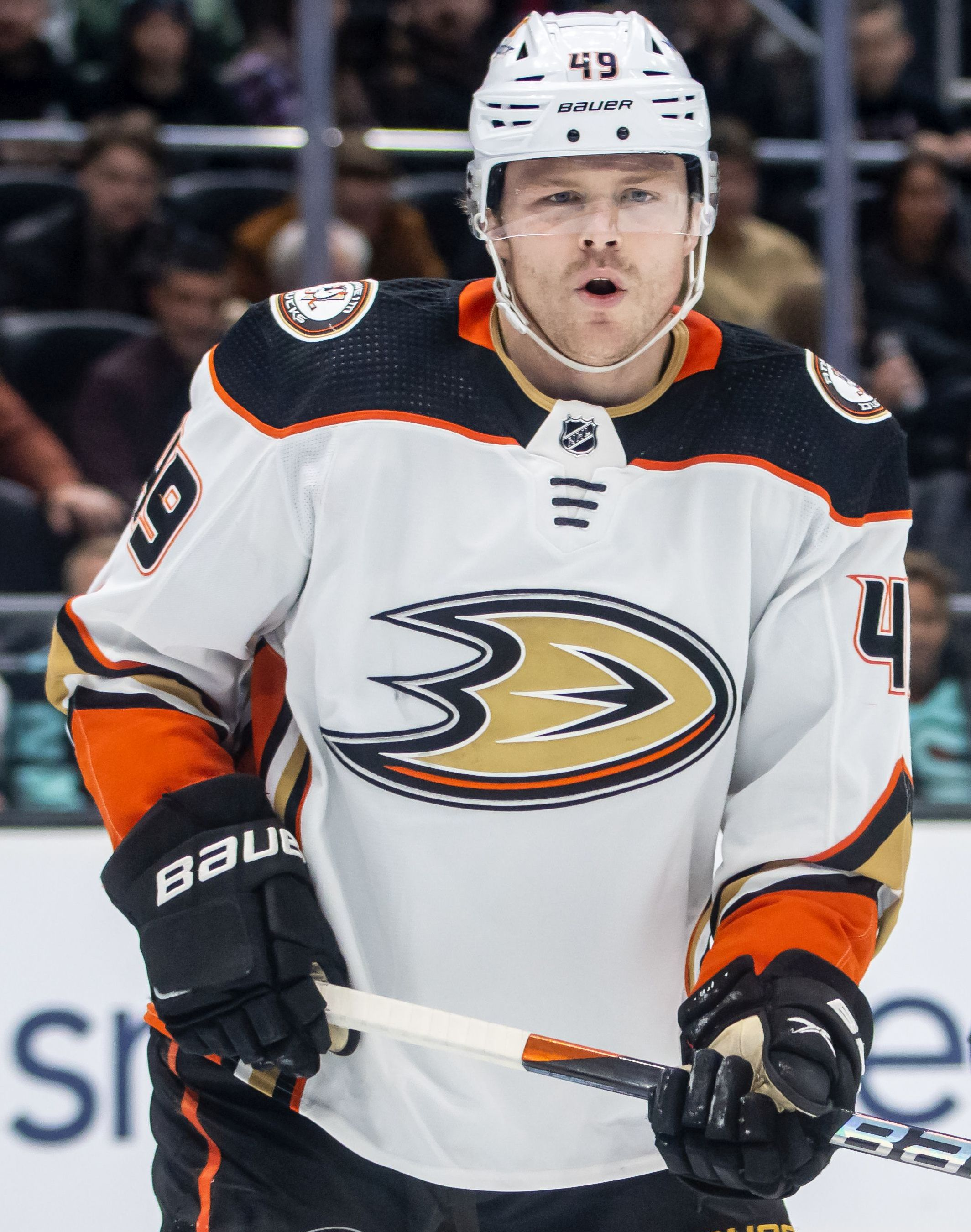
- Jones with the Anaheim Ducks in 2023.
- Born: February 17, 1998 (age 28) Rochester, Michigan, U.S.
- Height: 6 ft 3 in (191 cm)
- Weight: 225 lb (102 kg; 16 st 1 lb)
- Position: Forward
- Shoots: Left
- NHL team Former teams: Edmonton Oilers; Anaheim Ducks; Boston Bruins
- NHL draft: 24th overall, 2016; Anaheim Ducks
- Playing career: 2017–present

Max Jones (born February 17, 1998) is an American professional ice hockey player who is a forward for the Edmonton Oilers of the National Hockey League (NHL). Jones was drafted by the Anaheim Ducks, 24th overall, in the 2016 NHL entry draft.

== Playing career ==
=== Junior hockey ===
==== U.S. National Development Team Program ====
Growing up in Rochester, Michigan, Jones played in the junior Honeybaked Hockey program. Jones suited up for the U.S. National Development Team during the 2014–15 season. In 24 games in the United States Hockey League (USHL), Jones scored five goals and 10 points, while earning 116 penalty minutes. Jones also appeared in 38 games with the U17 team, scoring 18 goals and 28 points, as well as earning 189 penalty minutes.

==== London Knights ====
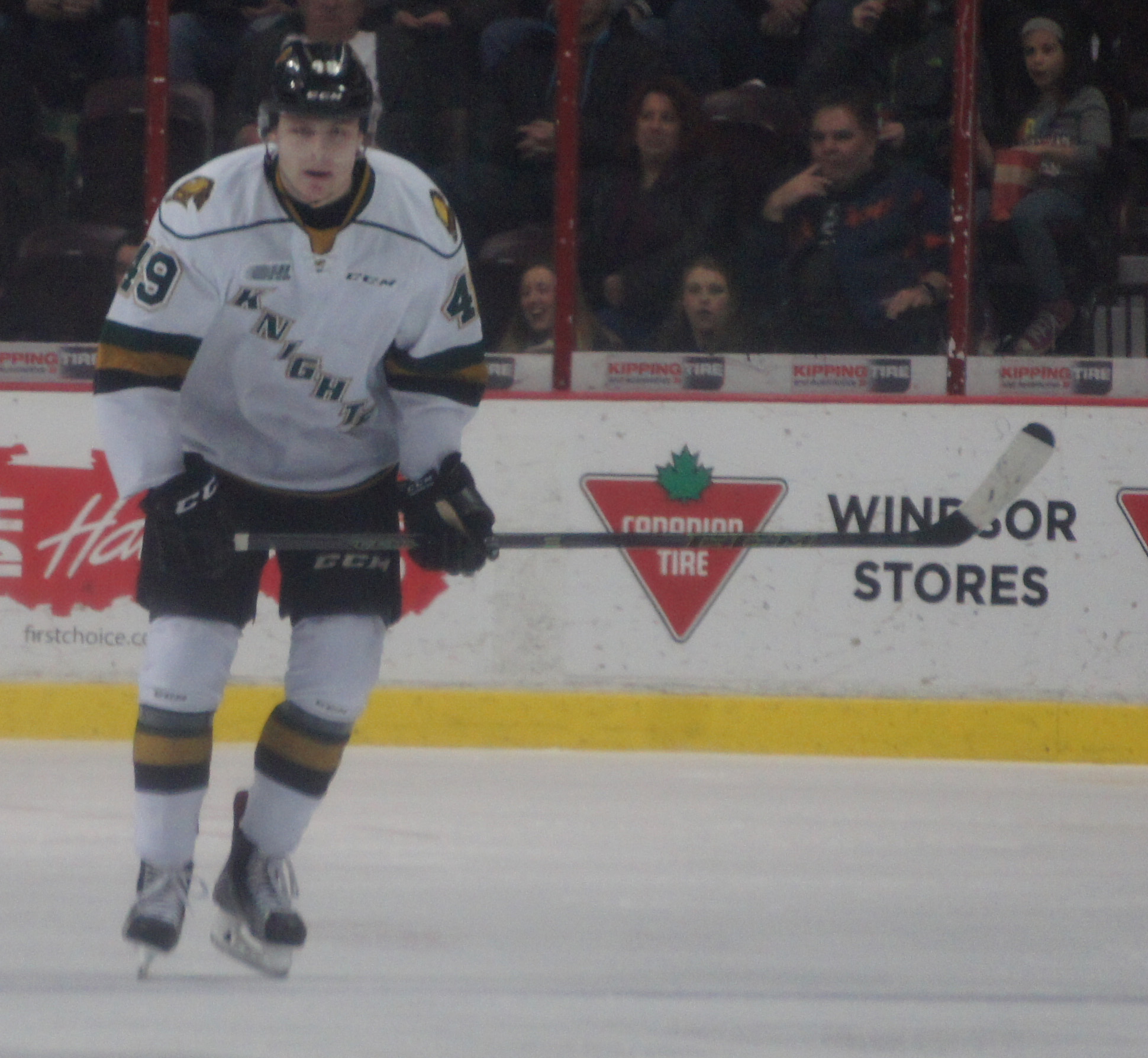
Jones with the London Knights in 2016

Jones was selected by the London Knights of the Ontario Hockey League (OHL) in the first round, 18th overall, in the 2014 OHL Priority Selection. Jones joined the Knights for the 2015–16 season. Jones appeared in his first career OHL game on September 25, 2015, being held off the score sheet in a 5–3 win over the Hamilton Bulldogs. On October 4, Jones earned his first career OHL point, an assist, in a 5–2 victory over the Oshawa Generals. In his seventh career OHL game, Jones scored his first goal in a 7–2 win on October 17. One week later, on October 24, Jones earned his first career OHL hat trick, as he scored three goals, including the overtime winner, in a 4–3 win over the North Bay Battalion. On October 31, Jones notched another hat trick, in a 7–0 win over the Saginaw Spirit. Overall, Jones finished his rookie season with 28 goals and 52 points in 63 games, helping the Knights to a 105-point season and a third-place finish in the Western Conference. Jones made his OHL post-season debut on March 25, 2016, scoring a goal and an assist in a 4–1 Knights victory over the Owen Sound Attack,. On March 30, Jones was involved in an incident in which he would earn a 12-game suspension from the OHL for a blind-side bodycheck on Justin Barack of the Attack. Jones returned from his suspension to play in the third game of the Knights J. Ross Robertson Cup final series against the Niagara IceDogs. Jones helped the Knights clinch the championship, as London swept Niagara in four games, to earn a berth in the 2016 Memorial Cup.

At the 2016 Memorial Cup, Jones played in the Knights opening game against the Red Deer Rebels on May 20, however, he was held off the score sheet in a 6–2 win. On May 23, Jones scored his first career Memorial Cup goal and added an assist in a 9–1 win over the Brandon Wheat Kings. The Knights advanced to the Memorial Cup final, and Jones earned an assist in a 3–2 victory over the Rouyn-Noranda Huskies, as London won the Memorial Cup.

Jones returned to the Knights for the 2016–17 season. On October 24, Jones set a career-high with four points, as he scored two goals and assisted on two others, in a 5–1 Knights victory over the Saginaw Spirit. Jones suffered through an injury-plagued season, appearing in only 33 games. He also missed ten games due to a suspension that began on February 23 for a cross-check on Jonah Gadjovich of the Owen Sound Attack. However, he scored 17 goals and 36 points, helping London reach the post-season. In the playoffs, Jones scored seven goals and 12 points in 14 games, as London lost to the Erie Otters in the Western Conference final.

Jones began the 2017–18 season with the Knights. On October 20, Jones earned a hat trick in a 5–1 win over the Kitchener Rangers. On December 10, Jones tied his career-high for points in a game, scoring twice and earning two assists in a 6–2 victory over the Erie Otters. On January 7, 2018, the Knights traded Jones to the Kingston Frontenacs in exchange for Sergey Popov, a second-round draft pick in 2023, and a third-round draft pick in 2021. Jones played in 25 games with the Knights, scoring 18 goals and 21 points.

==== Kingston Frontenacs ====
Jones made his debut with the Kingston Frontenacs on January 12, 2018, earning no points in a 4–2 loss to the Guelph Storm but still earning third star in the game. In his next game with Kingston, Jones scored his first goal with the club, beating Cole Ceci of the Oshawa Generals, and added two assists in a 4–1 win. On January 21, Jones suffered a broken thumb in a game against the Mississauga Steelheads, sidelining him for the remainder of the regular season. In six games with Kingston, Jones had a goal and two assists. In the post-season, Jones missed the first seven games due to his injury, however, he made his playoff debut with Kingston on April 8, earning no points in a 4–2 win over the Barrie Colts. On April 12, Jones scored his first playoff goal for the Frontenacs, scoring the opening goal against Leo Lazarev in a 7–1 win. In nine playoff games with Kingston, Jones scored three goals and four points, as the Frontenacs lost to the Hamilton Bulldogs in the Eastern Conference final.

=== Professional career ===
==== Anaheim Ducks ====
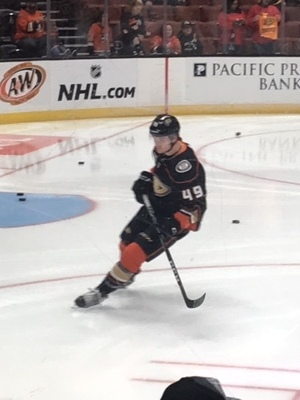
Jones with the Ducks in 2019

Jones was drafted by the Anaheim Ducks of the National Hockey League (NHL) in the first round, 24th overall, of the 2016 NHL entry draft held at the First Niagara Center in Buffalo, New York. On August 26, 2016, Jones signed a three-year entry-level contract with the Ducks. Following the elimination of his junior club, the London Knights, in the 2017 OHL playoffs, the Ducks assigned Jones to their American Hockey League (AHL) affiliate, the San Diego Gulls for the remainder of the playoffs on April 22, 2017. Jones appeared in his first career AHL playoff game that night, earning no points in a 2–1 win over the Ontario Reign. On May 10, Jones scored his first professional goal against Troy Grosenick of the San Jose Barracuda in a 4–3 overtime loss. In nine post-season games, Jones scored a goal and an assist.

Jones started the 2018–19 season with the San Diego Gulls, and on November 3, 2018, scored his first regular-season AHL goal against the Ontario Reign. On January 16, 2019, he was called up to the NHL. The next night he made his debut, helping the Ducks to a 3–0 win against the Minnesota Wild at Xcel Energy Center in Saint Paul. He registered his first NHL point against the Wild on February 19 and scored his first NHL goal on Carey Price in an 8–2 victory over the Montreal Canadiens on March 8. At the end of the NHL season, Jones registered two goals and five points with Anaheim. He was sent back to San Diego in April to help the Gulls in their Calder Cup playoff run, where he scored four points in eight games, missing some time due to injury.

Jones made the Ducks team out of training camp for the 2019–20 season, but split time with the Gulls after being returned to the AHL to develop some more. Jones spent the entire 2020–21 season with the Ducks and registered his first multi-point game, assisting on two of the three goals in a 3–2 overtime win over the St. Louis Blues on March 28, 2021. He finished the season with 11 points in 46 games. He signed a three-year extension with Anaheim on August 10, 2021. After playing the first two games of the 2021–22 season, Jones tore his pectoral muscle and missed the remainder of the season. He returned for the 2022–23 season and the Ducks sought to return him slowly, limiting his playing time by playing him lower down the lineup after Jones had missed the previous season. As the season wore on, his playing time and responsibility was increased, moving up to the first two lines playing with Troy Terry and Mason McTavish. In the 2023–24 season, Jones missed 30 games with injuries spread out of over the season. He appeared in 52 games, scoring 5 goals and 15 points. A restricted free agent at the end of the season, the Ducks declined to offer him a qualifying offer to keep his rights and he became an unrestricted free agent.

==== Boston Bruins ====
After six seasons with the Ducks, Jones signed a two-year, $2 million contract with the Boston Bruins on July 1, 2024.

He made the Bruins out of training camp, but struggled early with the team. He appeared in only four games with the team, being a healthy scratch in every other before being placed on waivers on November 5. He went unclaimed and was assigned to Boston's AHL affiliate, the Providence Bruins, on November 6. He was recalled on January 21, 2025 along with Patrick Brown after Mark Kastelic was injured. He appeared in three more games with the Bruins, going scoreless, before being returned to Providence on January 30. He registered 13 goals and 21 points in 38 games with Providence.

==== Edmonton Oilers ====
On March 4, 2025, Jones was traded to the Edmonton Oilers, alongside unsigned forward prospect Petr Hauser, in exchange for defenseman Max Wanner, a second-round draft pick in 2025, and a fourth-round pick in 2026, as part of a three-team exchange that sent fellow Boston forward Trent Frederic to Edmonton. He was assigned to Edmonton's AHL affiliate, the Bakersfield Condors, after the trade.

Jones was recalled to the NHL team the following day, and made his debut with Oilers on March 6, providing an assist in a 3-2 win over the Montreal Canadiens. Jones would stay with the squad for the rest of the season, playing 19 games with the Oilers, and scoring his first goal as a member of the team in the last game of the regular season against the San Jose Sharks. Although the Oilers would reach the Stanley Cup Final before losing in six games, Jones was a healthy scratch, not appearing in any postseason games.

== International play ==
Medal record

Representing United States

Men's ice hockey

World Junior Championships
Bronze medal – third place	2018 Canada	

Jones was selected for Team USA at the 2018 World Junior Championship. Jones scored his only goal of the tournament in the opening game, a 9–0 win over Denmark. Team USA went on to take the bronze medal in the tournament.

== Personal life ==
Jones's father, Brad, is a former player who played 148 NHL games with three different teams (Winnipeg Jets, Los Angeles Kings and Philadelphia Flyers). Jones’ mother was an alternate on the Olympic Diving Team in 1988. Jones is married.

== Career statistics ==
=== Regular season and playoffs ===
			Regular season					Playoffs
Season	Team	League	GP	G	A	Pts	PIM	GP	G	A	Pts	PIM
2014–15	U.S. National Development Team	USHL	24	5	5	10	116	—	—	—	—	—
2015–16	London Knights	OHL	63	28	24	52	106	6	1	1	2	23
2016–17	London Knights	OHL	33	17	19	36	65	14	7	5	12	24
2016–17	San Diego Gulls	AHL	—	—	—	—	—	9	1	1	2	6
2017–18	London Knights	OHL	25	18	3	21	34	—	—	—	—	—
2017–18	Kingston Frontenacs	OHL	6	1	2	3	2	9	3	1	4	28
2018–19	San Diego Gulls	AHL	43	14	15	29	50	8	0	4	4	10
2018–19	Anaheim Ducks	NHL	30	2	3	5	14	—	—	—	—	—
2019–20	Anaheim Ducks	NHL	59	8	4	12	36	—	—	—	—	—
2019–20	San Diego Gulls	AHL	8	2	0	2	21	—	—	—	—	—
2020–21	Anaheim Ducks	NHL	46	7	4	11	36	—	—	—	—	—
2021–22	Anaheim Ducks	NHL	2	0	0	0	15	—	—	—	—	—
2022–23	Anaheim Ducks	NHL	69	9	10	19	77	—	—	—	—	—
2023–24	Anaheim Ducks	NHL	52	5	10	15	33	—	—	—	—	—
2024–25	Boston Bruins	NHL	7	0	0	0	8	—	—	—	—	—
2024–25	Providence Bruins	AHL	38	13	8	21	38	—	—	—	—	—
2024–25	Edmonton Oilers	NHL	19	1	1	2	10	—	—	—	—	—
2025–26	Edmonton Oilers	NHL	21	3	2	5	9	—	—	—	—	—
2025–26	Bakersfield Condors	AHL	39	10	8	18	61	—	—	—	—	—
NHL totals			305	35	34	69	238	—	—	—	—	—

=== International ===
Year	Team	Event	Result	GP	G	A	Pts	PIM
2014	United States	U17	2nd place, silver medalist(s)	6	7	4	11	14
2018	United States	WJC	3rd place, bronze medalist(s)	7	1	1	2	2
Junior totals				13	8	5	13	16

Awards and achievements
Preceded by Jacob Larsson	Anaheim Ducks first-round draft pick 2016	Succeeded by Sam Steel
