= 2016 Memorial Cup =

Canadian junior men's ice hockey championship

Tournament details
- Venue(s): ENMAX Centrium; Red Deer, Alberta
- Dates: May 20–29, 2016
- Teams: 4
- Host team: Red Deer Rebels (WHL)
- TV partner(s): Sportsnet, TVA Sports

Final positions
- Champions: London Knights (OHL) (2nd title)
- Runners-up: Rouyn-Noranda Huskies (QMJHL)

Tournament statistics
- Attendance: 58,750
- Scoring leader: Mitch Marner (Knights) (14 points)

Awards
- MVP: Mitch Marner (Knights)

The Memorial Cup trophy

The 2016 Memorial Cup (branded as the 2016 Mastercard Memorial Cup for sponsorship reasons) was a four-team, round-robin format tournament that took place at the ENMAX Centrium in Red Deer, from May 20–29, 2016. It was the 98th Memorial Cup championship and determined the champion of the Canadian Hockey League (CHL). The tournament was hosted by the Red Deer Rebels, who won the right to host the tournament over a bid by the Vancouver Giants. Other teams participating were the WHL champion Brandon Wheat Kings, the OHL champion London Knights, and the QMJHL champion Rouyn-Noranda Huskies. The tournament ended with the London Knights winning their second Memorial Cup, defeating the Rouyn-Noranda Huskies 3–2 in overtime in the championship final. The Knights won 17 consecutive games to take the title, dating back to the second round of the OHL playoffs.

Red Deer was the first city in Alberta to host since 1974, and the Rebels were therefore the first Albertan host team since the tournament adopted its current format in 1983. All games were televised in Canada on Sportsnet and TVA Sports. The NHL Network televised the games in the United States.

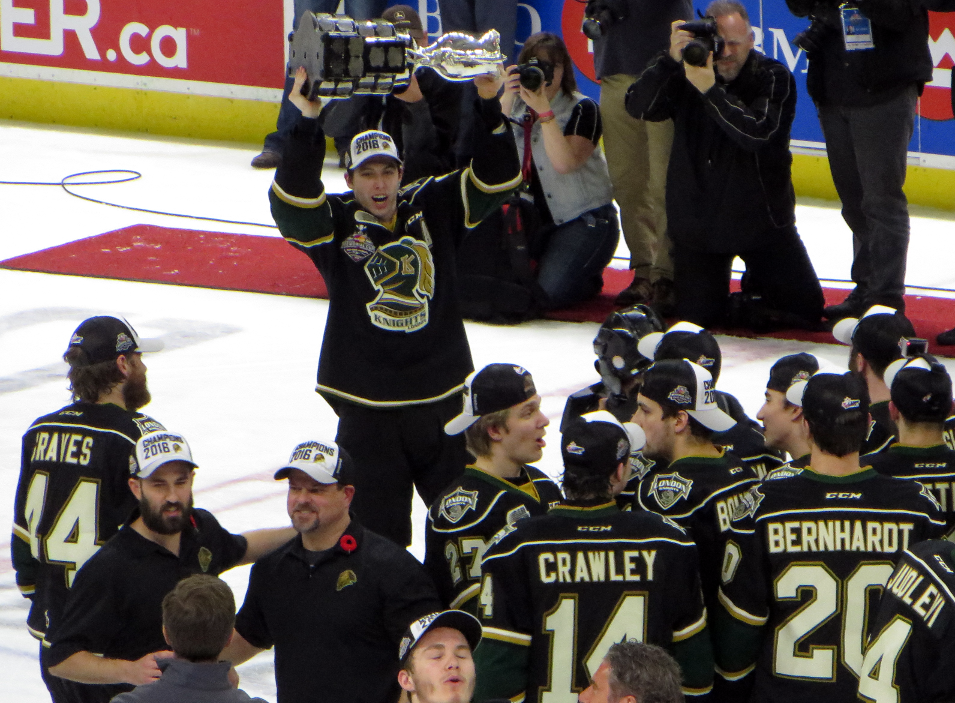
Mitch Marner lifts the Memorial Cup over his head following the London Knights' victory.

== Round-robin standings ==
Pos	Team	Pld	W	L	GF	GA	
1	London Knights (OHL)	3	3	0	20	5	Advanced directly to the championship game
2	Red Deer Rebels (WHL/Host)	3	2	1	9	9	Advanced to the semifinal game
3	Rouyn-Noranda Huskies (QMJHL)	3	1	2	9	13	Advanced to the semifinal game
4	Brandon Wheat Kings (WHL)	3	0	3	5	16	

== Schedule ==
All times local (UTC −7)

=== Round robin ===
May 20	Red Deer Rebels	2–6	London Knights	ENMAX Centrium	Recap
No scoring		First period	13:51 – pp – Aaron Berisha (1); 16:39 – Christian Dvorak (1); 18:31 – Christian Dvorak (2)
Luke Philp (1) – 19:45		Second period	13:04 – Mitch Marner (1); 16:59 – pp – Victor Mete (1); 18:45 – Mitch Marner (2)
Adam Helewka (1) – 9:35		Third period	No scoring
Rylan Toth 30 saves / 36 shots		Goalie stats	Tyler Parsons 30 saves / 32 shots

May 21	Rouyn-Noranda Huskies	5–3	Brandon Wheat Kings	ENMAX Centrium	Recap
A.J. Greer (1) – 14:06; Gabriel Fontaine (1) – 18:33; Timo Meier (1) – 19:36		First period	2:44 – Reid Duke (1)
Philippe Myers (1) – pp – 13:29; Timo Meier (2) – 17:10		Second period	No scoring
No scoring		Third period	8:07 – Tyler Coulter (1); 12:14 – John Quenneville (1)
Chase Marchand 38 saves / 41 shots		Goalie stats	Jordan Papirny 24 saves / 29 shots

May 22	Rouyn-Noranda Huskies	2–5	Red Deer Rebels	ENMAX Centrium	Recap
Timo Meier (3) – pp – 4:17; Julien Nantel (1) – 8:00		First period	11:07 – Evan Polei (1)
No scoring		Second period	0:40 – Adam Helewka (2); 4:46 – pp – Jake DeBrusk (1); 8:50 – Adam Helewka (3)
No scoring		Third period	16:56 – Haydn Fleury (1)
Chase Marchand 33 saves / 38 shots		Goalie stats	Rylan Toth 22 saves / 24 shots

May 23	London Knights	9–1	Brandon Wheat Kings	ENMAX Centrium	Recap
Christian Dvorak (3) – pp – 4:35; Cliff Pu (1) – 7:50; Aaron Berisha (2) – pp – 14:36; Matthew Tkachuk (1) – 19:29		First period	No scoring
J.J. Piccinich (1) – 4:30; Christian Dvorak (4) – pp – 10:51; Max Jones (1) – 18:16		Second period	6:26 – pp – Stelio Mattheos (1)
Christian Dvorak (5) – 0:43; Daniel Bernhardt (1) – pp – 2:44		Third period	No scoring
Tyler Parsons 24 saves / 25 shots Brendan Burke 11 saves / 11 shots		Goalie stats	Jordan Papirny 19 saves / 26 shots Logan Thompson 3 saves / 5 shots

May 24	London Knights	5–2	Rouyn-Noranda Huskies	ENMAX Centrium	Recap
J.J. Piccinich (2) – pp – 6:06; Matthew Tkachuk (2) – pp – 17:43		First period	No scoring
Max Jones (2) - sh - 17:28		Second period	10:04 – pp – Timo Meier (4)
Christian Dvorak (6) – pp – 6:20; Matthew Tkachuk (3) – en – 18:29		Third period	7:59 – pp – Timo Meier (5)
Tyler Parsons 30 saves / 32 shots		Goalie stats	Chase Marchand 20 saves / 24 shots

May 25	Brandon Wheat Kings	1–2	OT	Red Deer Rebels	ENMAX Centrium	Recap
No scoring		First period		No scoring
Tim McGauley (1) – 11:26		Second period		No scoring
No scoring		Third period		14:55 – Adam Musil (1)
No scoring		First overtime period		3:50 – Evan Polei (2)
Jordan Papirny 30 saves / 32 shots		Goalie stats		Rylan Toth 33 saves / 34 shots

=== Playoff round ===
==== Semi-final ====
May 27	Red Deer Rebels	1–3	Rouyn-Noranda Huskies	ENMAX Centrium	Recap
No scoring		First period	10:51 – pp – Francis Perron (1); 11:58 – Mārtiņš Dzierkals (1)
Luke Philp (2) – pp – 13:34		Second period	5:04 – pp – Nikolas Brouillard (1)
No scoring		Third period	No scoring
Rylan Toth 24 saves / 27 shots		Goalie stats	Chase Marchand 36 saves / 37 shots

==== Final ====
May 29	London Knights	3–2	OT	Rouyn-Noranda Huskies	ENMAX Centrium	Recap
No scoring		First period		No scoring
Matthew Tkachuk (4) – 9:19		Second period		9:34 – Francis Perron (2)
Christian Dvorak (7) – 15:49		Third period		9:13 – Julien Nantel (2)
Matthew Tkachuk (5) – 7:49		First overtime period		No scoring
Tyler Parsons 29 saves / 31 shots		Goalie stats		Chase Marchand 30 saves / 33 saves

== Statistical leaders ==
=== Skaters ===
Player	Team	GP	G	A	Pts	PIM
Mitch Marner	London Knights	4	2	12	14	4
Christian Dvorak	London Knights	4	7	5	12	0
Matthew Tkachuk	London Knights	4	5	3	8	4
Timo Meier	Rouyn-Noranda Huskies	5	5	3	8	6
Francis Perron	Rouyn-Noranda Huskies	5	2	6	8	0
Olli Juolevi	London Knights	4	0	7	7	6
Haydn Fleury	Red Deer Rebels	4	1	4	5	4
Adam Helewka	Red Deer Rebels	4	3	1	4	0
Aaron Berisha	London Knights	4	2	2	4	0
Max Jones	London Knights	4	2	2	4	8

GP = Games played; G = Goals; A = Assists; Pts = Points; PIM = Penalty minutes

=== Goaltending ===
This is a combined table of the top goaltenders based on goals against average and save percentage with at least 120 minutes played. The table is sorted by GAA.

Player	Team	GP	W	L	OTL	SA	GA	GAA	SV%	SO	TOI
Tyler Parsons	London Knights	4	4	0	0	120	7	1.78	.942	0	235
Rylan Toth	Red Deer Rebels	4	2	2	0	121	12	2.99	.901	0	241
Chase Marchand	Rouyn-Noranda Huskies	5	2	2	1	173	16	3.13	.908	0	307
Jordan Papirny	Brandon Wheat Kings	3	0	2	1	87	14	5.16	.839	0	163

GP = Games played; W = Wins; L = Losses; SA = Shots against; GA = Goals against; GAA = Goals against average; SV% = Save percentage; SO = Shutouts; TOI = Time on ice (minutes:seconds)

== Awards ==
- Stafford Smythe Memorial Trophy (MVP): Mitch Marner, London Knights
- Ed Chynoweth Trophy (Leading Scorer): Mitch Marner, London Knights
- George Parsons Trophy (Sportsmanlike): Francis Perron, Rouyn-Noranda Huskies
- Hap Emms Memorial Trophy (Top Goalie): Tyler Parsons, London Knights
- All-Star Team:

Goaltender: Tyler Parsons, London Knights
Defence: Olli Juolevi, London Knights; Haydn Fleury, Red Deer Rebels
Forwards: Christian Dvorak, London Knights; Mitch Marner, London Knights; Timo Meier, Rouyn-Noranda Huskies

== Rosters ==
=== Red Deer Rebels (Host) ===
- Head coach: Brent Sutter

Pos.	No.	Player
G	31	Rylan Toth
G	35	Trevor Martin
D	2	Austin Strand
D	3	Colton Bobyk
D	4	Haydn Fleury
D	5	Josh Mahura
D	6	Nelson Nogier
D	8	Kayle Doetzel
D	26	Austin Shmoorkoff
F	9	Conner Bleackley
F	10	Evan Polei
F	11	Jeff de Wit
F	12	Luke Philp
F	13	Ivan Nikolishin
F	14	Austin Pratt
F	16	Grayson Pawlenchuk
F	17	Reese Johnson
F	18	Braden Purtill
F	19	Jake DeBrusk
F	20	Akash Bains
F	22	Brandon Hagel
F	23	Michael Špaček
F	25	Adam Musil
F	27	Taden Rattie
F	28	Adam Helewka

=== Brandon Wheat Kings (WHL) ===
- Head coach: Kelly McCrimmon

Pos.	No.	Player
G	1	Logan Thompson
G	33	Jordan Papirny
D	2	Mitchell Wheaton
D	5	Schael Higson
D	9	Ivan Provorov
D	10	Kale Clague
D	20	Macoy Erkamps
D	29	Mark Matsuba
D	32	James Shearer
D	34	Jordan Thomson
F	8	Jayce Hawryluk
F	11	Caiden Daley
F	12	Stelio Mattheos
F	14	Ty Lewis
F	16	Tanner Kaspick
F	17	John Quenneville
F	18	Garrett Armour
F	19	Nolan Patrick
F	21	Tyler Coulter
F	22	Jaeger White
F	23	Tim McGauley
F	24	Connor Gutenberg
F	25	Duncan Campbell
F	26	Linden McCorrister
F	27	Reid Duke

=== Rouyn-Noranda Huskies (QMJHL) ===
- Head coach: Gilles Bouchard

Pos.	No.	Player
G	1	Samuel Harvey
G	35	Chase Marchand
D	3	Jacob Neveu
D	5	Jérémy Lauzon
D	6	Philippe Myers
D	7	Bruno-Carl Denis
D	14	Nikolas Brouillard
D	21	Allan Caron
D	28	Johnatan Legault
D	29	Zachary Lauzon
F	4	Gabriel Fontaine
F	8	A.J. Greer
F	10	Mārtiņš Dzierkals
F	11	Julien Nantel
F	15	Anthony Wojcik
F	16	J.C. Beaudin
F	18	Mathieu Boucher
F	19	Antoine Waked
F	20	Timo Meier
F	22	Peter Abbandonato
F	24	Alexandre Fortin
F	26	Rafaël Harvey-Pinard
F	27	Francis Perron

=== London Knights (OHL) ===
- Head coach: Dale Hunter

Pos.	No.	Player
G	1	Tyler Parsons
G	50	Brendan Burke
D	2	Evan Bouchard
D	3	Nicolas Mattinen
D	4	Olli Juolevi
D	14	Brandon Crawley
D	44	Jacob Graves
D	74	Aiden Jamieson
D	86	Chris Martenet
D	98	Victor Mete
F	7	Matthew Tkachuk
F	10	Christian Dvorak
F	11	Owen MacDonald
F	20	Daniel Bernhardt
F	21	Chandler Yakimowicz
F	27	Robert Thomas
F	28	Chad Heffernan
F	49	Max Jones
F	63	Cliff Pu
F	67	Kole Sherwood
F	72	Aaron Berisha
F	84	JJ Piccinich
F	93	Mitch Marner

== Road to the Cup ==
=== WHL Playoffs ===
Conference Quarter-finals	Conference Semi-finals
E1	Brandon	4
W2	Edmonton	2
E1	Brandon	4
E3	Moose Jaw	1
E2	Prince Albert	1
E3	Moose Jaw	4
Eastern
C2	Red Deer	4
C3	Calgary	1
C2	Red Deer	4
W1	Regina	3
C1	Lethbridge	1
W1	Regina	4
B1	Victoria	4
W2	Spokane	2
B1	Victoria	3
B2	Kelowna	4
B2	Kelowna	4
B3	Kamloops	3
Western
U1	Seattle	4
W1	Prince George	0
U1	Seattle	4
U2	Everett	1
U2	Everett	4
U3	Portland	0

Conference Finals
E1	Brandon	4
C2	Red Deer	1
B2	Kelowna	0
U1	Seattle	4

WHL Championship
E1	Brandon	4
U1	Seattle	1

=== OHL Playoffs ===
Conference Quarter-finals	Conference Semi-finals
2	Barrie	4
7	Mississauga	3
2	Barrie	4
3	North Bay	0
3	North Bay	4
6	Peterborough	3
Eastern Conference
1	Kingston	4
8	Oshawa	1
1	Kingston	0
4	Niagara	4
4	Niagara	4
5	Ottawa	1
Note: Pairings are re-seeded after the first round.
1	Erie	4
8	Saginaw	0
1	Erie	4
7	Sault Ste. Marie	1
2	Sarnia	3
7	Sault Ste. Marie	4
Western Conference
3	London	4
6	Owen Sound	2
3	London	4
4	Kitchener	0
4	Kitchener	4
5	Windsor	1

Conference Finals
2	Barrie	0
4	Niagara	4
1	Erie	0
3	London	4

OHL Championship
E4	Niagara	0
W3	London	4

=== QMJHL Playoffs ===
Round 1
1	Rouyn-Noranda	4
16	Drummondville	0
4	Val-d'Or	2
13	Blainville-Boisbriand	4
5	Gatineau	4
12	Quebec	0
6	Moncton	4
11	Victoriaville	1
2	Shawinigan	4
15	Sherbrooke	1
8	Rimouski	2
9	Charlottetown	4
3	Saint John	4
14	Acadie–Bathurst	1
7	Cape Breton	4
10	Chicoutimi	2

Quarter-finals
1	Rouyn-Noranda	4
13	Blainville-Boisbriand	1
5	Gatineau	2
6	Moncton	4
2	Shawinigan	4
9	Charlottetown	2
3	Saint John	4
7	Cape Breton	3

Semi-finals
1	Rouyn-Noranda	4
6	Moncton	2
2	Shawinigan	4
3	Saint John	1

President's Cup Championship
1	Rouyn-Noranda	4
2	Shawinigan	1
