= Matthew Tkachuk =

American ice hockey player (born 1997)

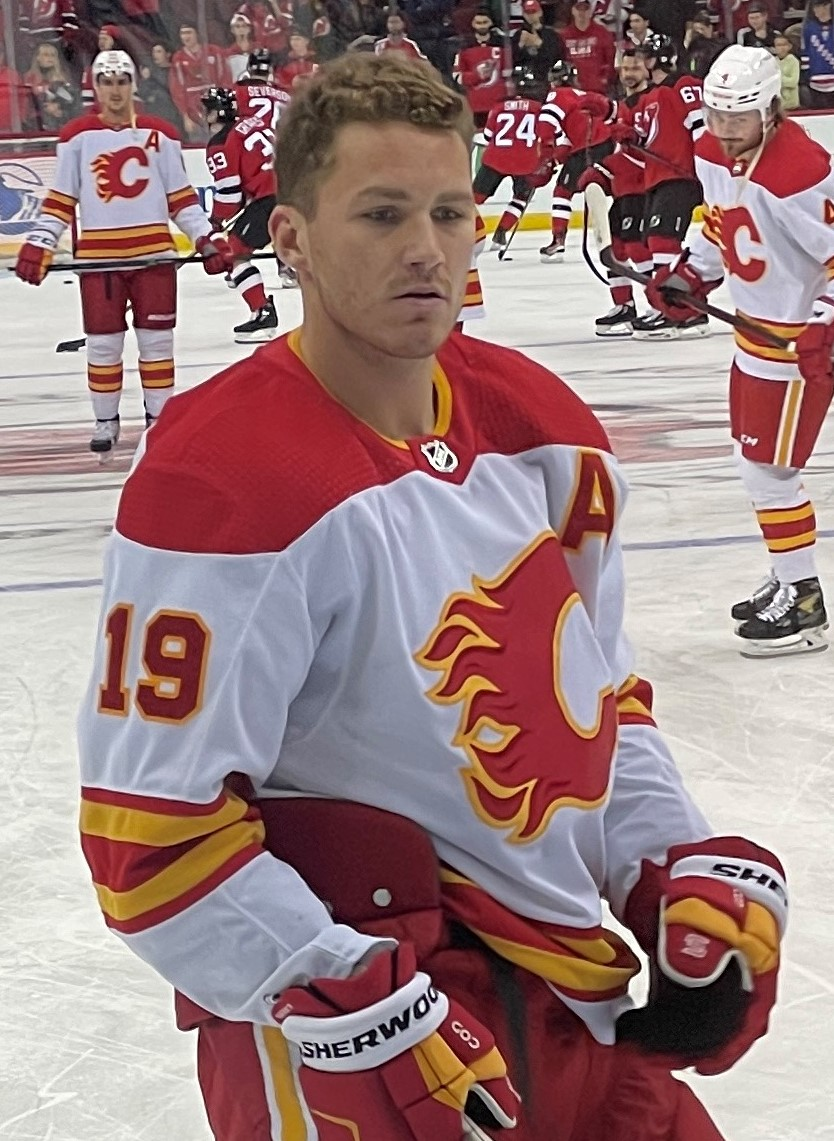
- Tkachuk with the Calgary Flames in October 2021
- Born: December 11, 1997 (age 28) Scottsdale, Arizona, U.S.
- Height: 6 ft 1 in (185 cm)
- Weight: 202 lb (92 kg; 14 st 6 lb)
- Position: Winger
- Shoots: Left
- NHL team Former teams: Florida Panthers; Calgary Flames
- National team: United States
- NHL draft: 6th overall, 2016; Calgary Flames
- Playing career: 2016–present

Matthew Brendan Tkachuk (/kəˈtʃʌk/ kə-CHUK; born December 11, 1997) is an American professional ice hockey player who is a winger and alternate captain for the Florida Panthers of the National Hockey League (NHL). He previously played in the NHL for the Calgary Flames. The Flames selected him in the first round, sixth overall, in the 2016 NHL entry draft.

The son of former NHL player Keith Tkachuk, Tkachuk was born in Scottsdale, Arizona, and raised in Creve Coeur, Missouri. He is a product of the USA Hockey National Team Development Program and played one season of major junior hockey with the London Knights of the Ontario Hockey League (OHL), where he scored the game-winning goal in overtime to win his team the 2016 Memorial Cup.

Internationally, Tkachuk has represented the United States at a U17 World Hockey Challenge, a U18 World Championship, at the 2016 World Junior Ice Hockey Championships, where his team won a bronze medal, and during the 4 Nations Face-Off in 2025. In the 2021–22 and 2022–23 NHL seasons, Tkachuk was a top ten point-scorer in the league, registering 104 and 109 points, respectively. In 2023, Tkachuk was named a finalist for the NHL's Hart Memorial Trophy as the league's most valuable player. Tkachuk won back-to-back Stanley Cup championships with the Panthers in 2024 and 2025, scoring the Stanley Cup-clinching goal in game six of the latter series. He also played in the 2026 Winter Olympics hockey tournament, winning gold alongside his brother, Brady Tkachuk.

== Early life ==
Tkachuk was born in Scottsdale, Arizona, to Keith and Chantal (née Oster) Tkachuk. His father is a former National Hockey League player who had an 18-year career with the original Winnipeg Jets, Phoenix Coyotes, St. Louis Blues and Atlanta Thrashers. Tkachuk's mother is a native of Winnipeg, Manitoba and met Tkachuk's father during his tenure with the Jets. Tkachuk was born in Scottsdale while his father was playing for the Coyotes. His younger brother, Brady, is his teammate on the Florida Panthers, and his younger sister, Taryn, is a former NCAA Division I field hockey player with the University of Virginia.

Tkachuk spent his formative years in NHL hockey rinks, watching his father practice from the players' bench. As an infant in Scottsdale, Tkachuk's mother would drop him off at the Phoenix Coyotes' former arena, the Ice Den, during his father's practice days, where the team's equipment managers would take on babysitting duties while she ran errands. Of his childhood, Tkachuk has said, "When you say you grew up in a rink people think, 'Oh, yeah, your dad played but you didn't really grow up there.' No, I literally grew up in the rink."

At age three, following his father being dealt to the St. Louis Blues, Tkachuk moved to Creve Coeur, Missouri, where he was raised. Tkachuk and his brother regularly accompanied their father to practices and traveled to watch him play in multiple NHL All-Star games, while NHL players David Backes, Lee Stempniak and Philip McRae all lived with Tkachuk and his family during their tenures with the Blues. Tkachuk attended the elementary program, formerly known as Oak Hill School, at Villa Duchesne, and completed the sixth through ninth grades at Chaminade College Preparatory School, where he was classmates with Boston Celtics forward Jayson Tatum.

During this time, Tkachuk played minor ice hockey with a youth affiliate of the St. Louis Blues, where he was teammates with fellow St. Louis-area players Clayton Keller, Logan Brown and Luke Kunin. Their team competed in the 2010 Quebec International Pee-Wee Hockey Tournament. Tkachuk left St. Louis after the ninth grade to join the USA Hockey National Team Development Program in Ann Arbor, Michigan.

== Playing career ==
=== Junior ===
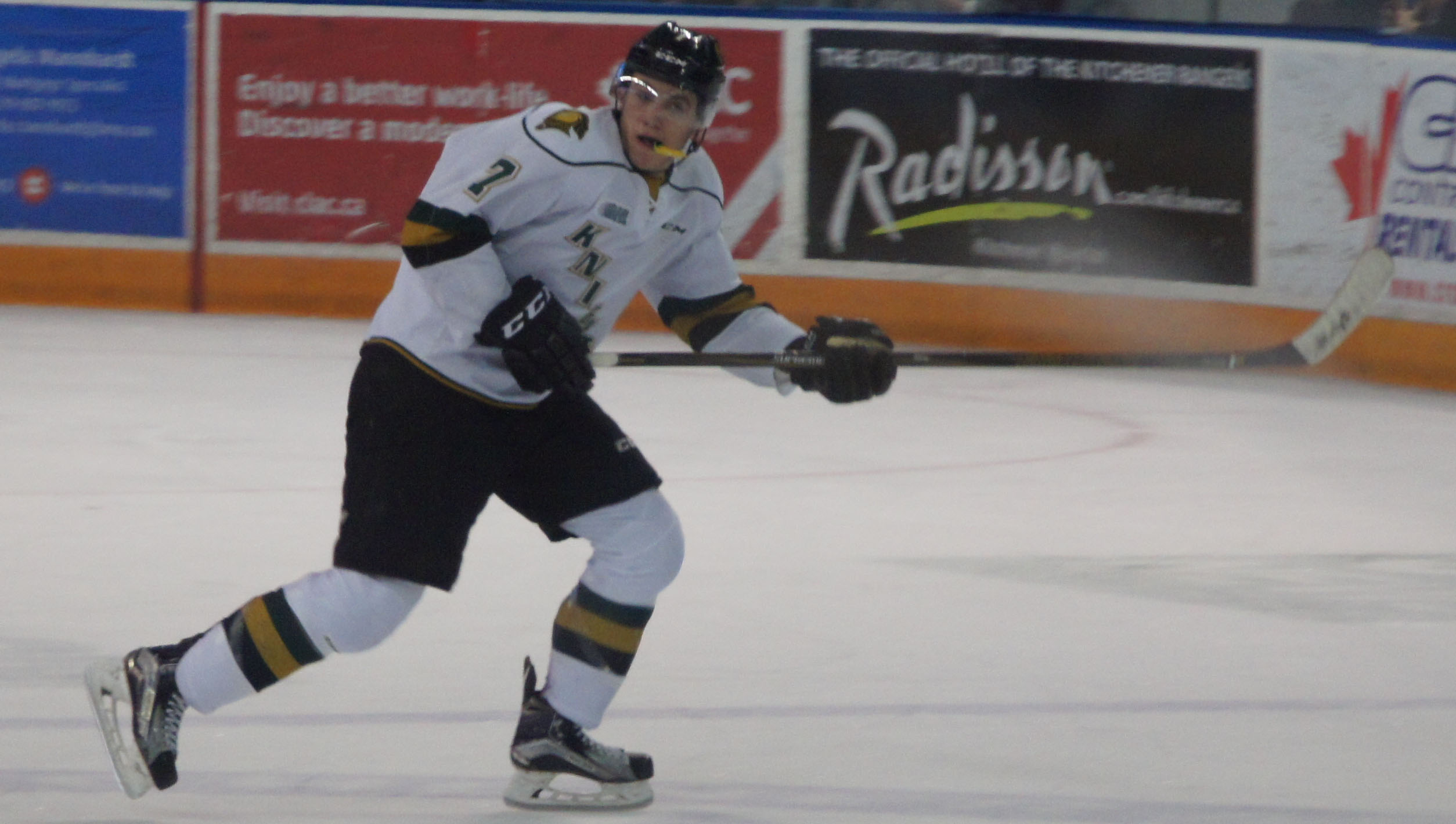
Tkachuk playing for the London Knights in April 2016

Tkachuk was drafted by the London Knights in the fourth round, 64th overall, of the 2013 Ontario Hockey League (OHL) Priority Selection. He played two seasons with the USA Hockey National Team Development Program for both the U.S. National U17 Team (USDP) and the U.S. National U18 Team (USDP). In his first season with the team, he registered 13 goals and 34 points in 53 games, and in his second season, he finished second on the team with 96 points (38 goals and 58 assists) in 65 games. During his time in Ann Arbor, Tkachuk played on a line with Auston Matthews and Jack Roslovic, and lived part-time with the family of teammate Christian Fischer.

Before the 2015–16 season, Tkachuk opted to join the London Knights roster, forfeiting his NCAA eligibility and de-committing from the University of Notre Dame. Playing on a line with Mitch Marner and Christian Dvorak, Tkachuk scored 107 points during the 2015-16 season (30 goals, 77 assists), placing him fifth overall in OHL scoring. He was named an OHL First Team All-Star and scored the game-winning goal in overtime for the Knights in the 2016 Memorial Cup final.

=== Professional (2016–present) ===
==== Calgary Flames (2016–2022) ====
Leading up to the 2016 NHL entry draft, Tkachuk was the second-ranked North American skater, described as "a bona fide future star for an NHL club that brings elite skills and attributes." After his selection by the Calgary Flames, sixth overall, Tkachuk was signed to a three-year, entry-level contract on July 7, 2016.

Tkachuk scored his first NHL goal in a 4–3 overtime win against the Buffalo Sabres. On March 20, 2017, he was suspended two games for an elbow to the face of Los Angeles Kings defenseman Drew Doughty. Tkachuk finished seventh in voting for the Calder Memorial Trophy, an award awarded annually to the top rookie in the NHL.

During his sophomore year, on November 17, 2017, the NHL Department of Player Safety announced that Tkachuk was suspended one game for his part in a line brawl that took place in a game against the Detroit Red Wings on November 15. He was suspended again on December 7, for spearing Toronto Maple Leafs winger Matt Martin. Tkachuk became the second youngest teenager in Flames history to reach 100 games, the first being Dan Quinn in 1985, when he played against the Arizona Coyotes on November 30. Tkachuk was injured in a game against the New York Islanders on March 11, 2018, and missed the rest of the season. Despite the injury, he finished the season with a career-high 49 points.

Before the 2018–19 season, Tkachuk was named an alternate captain for the Flames, along with Mikael Backlund and Sean Monahan. Tkachuk set a new career high for points during the season, and recorded his first career NHL hat-trick in a 6–3 win over the Vegas Golden Knights on March 10, 2019. On March 15, in a 5–1 victor over the New York Rangers, Tkachuk recorded his 100th career assist and became the first player from his draft class to reach that milestone.

After being absent from the Flames' training camp due to an unsigned contract, Tkachuk signed a three-year, $21 million extension on September 25, 2019.

On April 19, 2022, Tkachuk recorded his 99th point (an assist) in a 3–2 shootout loss to the Nashville Predators, surpassing his father's previous personal record (98 in 1995–96). Two days later, Tkachuk scored his 100th point (and 40 goals) in a 4–2 win against the Dallas Stars, becoming the second player, along with Auston Matthews from the 2016 draft class to score 100 points in a single season. The 2021–22 season was one of the most successful regular seasons in Flames history, with Tkachuk at the center of its success. Tkachuk would spend most of the season playing on the right wing with centreman Elias Lindholm and left winger Johnny Gaudreau. The trio formed one of the most dominant forward lines in the NHL, and all three members hit numerous personal and collective milestones throughout the season. All three scored at least 40 goals in the course of the season, the first time in 28 years that linemates had all achieved this, and only the fourth time in that span that a team had three 40-goal scorers. Tkachuk finished the regular season with 42 goals and 62 assists, while the Flames won the Pacific Division title. The Flames drew the Dallas Stars in the first round of the 2022 Stanley Cup playoffs, a rematch of the bubble playoffs two years prior, and a matchup in which the Flames were considered the favourites. Tkachuk scored the lone goal of game one, giving his team the victory. The series proved a greater challenge than anticipated, largely due to Stars goaltender Jake Oettinger, but the Flames eventually won in seven games, with Tkachuk managing another goal in the series-clinching game. The Flames drew the Edmonton Oilers in the second round, the first playoff "Battle of Alberta" in 31 years. The Flames were defeated by the Oilers in five games, bringing the playoff run to an end.

After the conclusion of the season, Gaudreau opted to leave the Flames in free agency to sign with the Columbus Blue Jackets. Tkachuk's own future with the team had been subject to speculation for some time, with many believing he intended to leave the Flames when he reached unrestricted free agency. Days after news of Gaudreau's departure, the Flames announced that they had filed for club arbitration on Tkachuk's next contract, having heretofore failed to come to terms on an extension. This was widely interpreted as being a preliminary measure in a move to trade him to another team, and thereby avoid losing Tkachuk in free agency for no compensation. On July 20, The Athletic reported that Tkachuk had told the Flames that he would not re-sign with the team for a long-term contract.

==== Florida Panthers (2022–present) ====
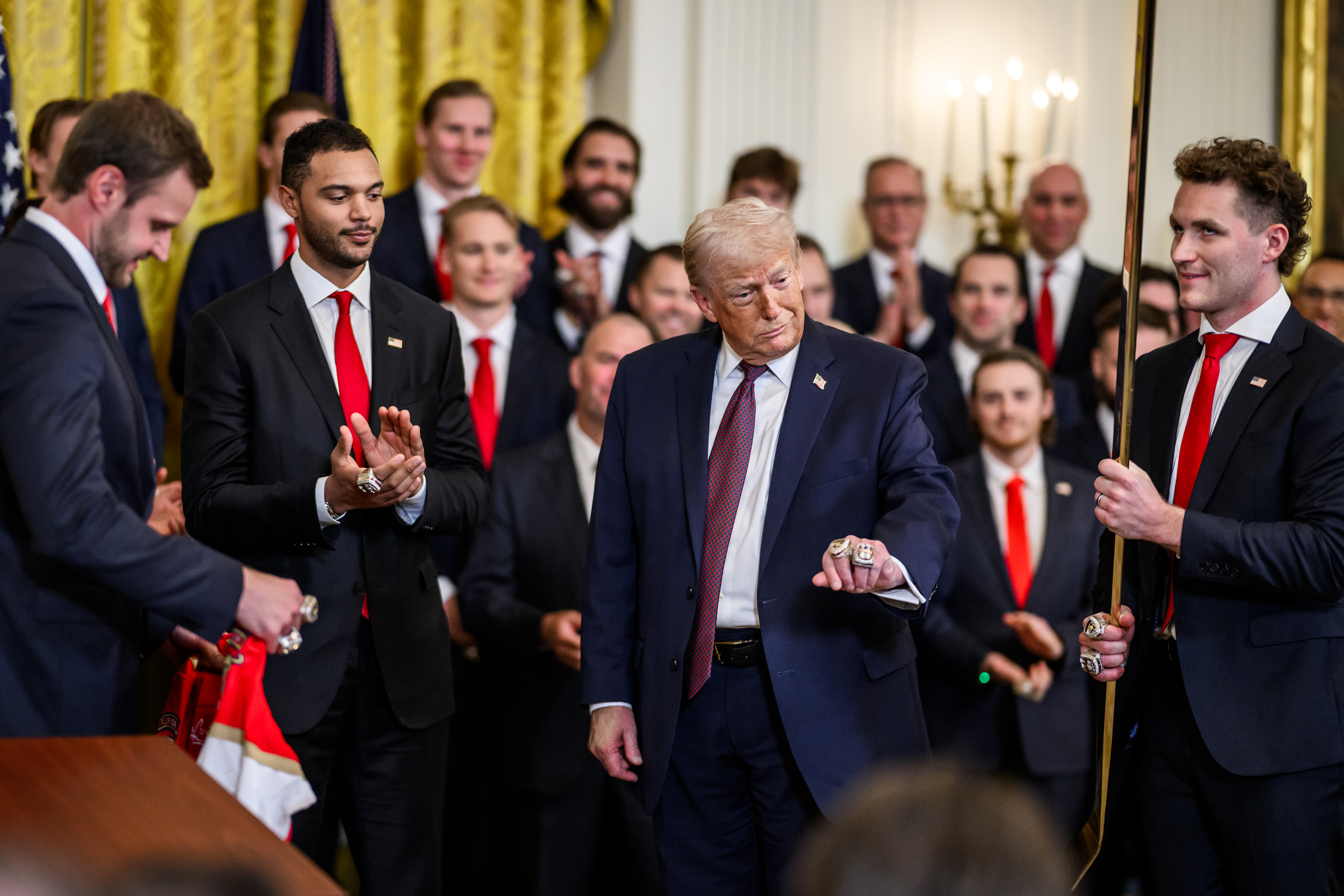
The Panthers celebrated their second consecutive Stanley Cup championship at the White House on January 15, 2026. Tkachuk is pictured on the right.

On July 22, 2022, two days after informing the Flames of his intention not to re-sign to a long-term deal, Tkachuk was traded to the Florida Panthers along with a conditional fourth-round draft pick in 2025 in exchange for Jonathan Huberdeau, Cole Schwindt, MacKenzie Weegar and a lottery-protected first-round pick in 2025. Tkachuk signed an eight-year, $76 million contract before being traded to the Panthers. In the NHL 2023 All-Star Game on February 4, 2023, Tkachuk was named the Game MVP after scoring four goals and three assists for seven total points. In his first season with the Florida Panthers, Tkachuk surpassed his record for points in a season, and finished with 109 at the end of his first year with Florida. In recognition of his achievements, Tkachuk was named a finalist for the Hart Memorial Trophy, awarded to the league's most valuable player, ultimately ceding the award to Edmonton Oilers forward and captain Connor McDavid. After scoring four goals including three game-winners against the Carolina Hurricanes in the Eastern Conference final, Tkachuk helped lead the Panthers to the 2023 Stanley Cup Final where the Panthers would fall to the Vegas Golden Knights in five games.

Tkachuk was named an alternate captain for the 2023–24 season. On January 9, 2024, against the St. Louis Blues, Tkachuk scored his fifth hat-trick and led the Panthers to their eighth straight win. He helped lead the Panthers back to the Stanley Cup Final for the second straight year, where they defeated the Edmonton Oilers in seven games, giving Tkachuk his first career Stanley Cup championship.

In the following season, the Panthers returned to the Stanley Cup Final for a third straight year, defeating the Edmonton Oilers for a second straight year in six games. Tkachuk was limited to 52 games in the 2024–25 regular season after sustaining a torn adductor muscle and a sports hernia on the same side, while representing the United States at the 4 Nations Face-Off in February 2025. He missed the final nine weeks of the regular season but returned for the start of the playoffs on April 22, appearing in all 23 postseason games and tying Sam Reinhart and Carter Verhaeghe for the team lead with 23 points (8 goals, 15 assists) as the Panthers won their second consecutive Stanley Cup. After the playoffs Tkachuk revealed his adductor had been torn from the bone.

In September 2025, Panthers general manager Bill Zito announced Tkachuk would miss the start of the 2025–26 season with a lower-body injury and was likely to be sidelined until December 2025. Tkachuk returned to play on January 21, 2026, in Panthers' 4–1 loss to the San Jose Sharks.

== International play ==
Medal record

Men's ice hockey

Representing the United States

Winter Olympics
| Gold medal – first place | 2026 Milano Cortina | |

World Junior Championships
| Bronze medal – third place | 2016 Finland | |

World U18 Championship
| Gold medal – first place | 2015 Switzerland | |

Tkachuk helped the United States win gold at the 2014 World U-17 Hockey Challenge. He also competed at the 2015 World U18 Championships, where in seven games he registered 10 assists (most in the tournament), leading the United States under-18 team to a gold medal win.

At the 2016 World Junior Championships, Tkachuk and Auston Matthews each scored 11 points to lead the United States junior team in scoring. After losing in the semifinals, the United States defeated Sweden to claim the bronze medal.

Tkachuk represented the United States at the 4 Nations Face-Off, He had put up three points in three games but would get injured and would be sidelined up until the start of the 2025 Stanley Cup playoffs.

On June 16, 2025, he was one of six players named to United States' preliminary roster for the 2026 Winter Olympics, in which he would win gold alongside his brother.

Amid online backlash faced by the men's Olympic hockey team regarding the inclusion of FBI director Kash Patel during their gold medal celebrations and members of the team laughing at President Trump's comments of being impeached if he did not invite the women's team to the White House, the team was invited to meet with the president and attend the State of the Union. Tkachuk was among the majority who visited with the president and attended the State of the Union.

== Personal life ==
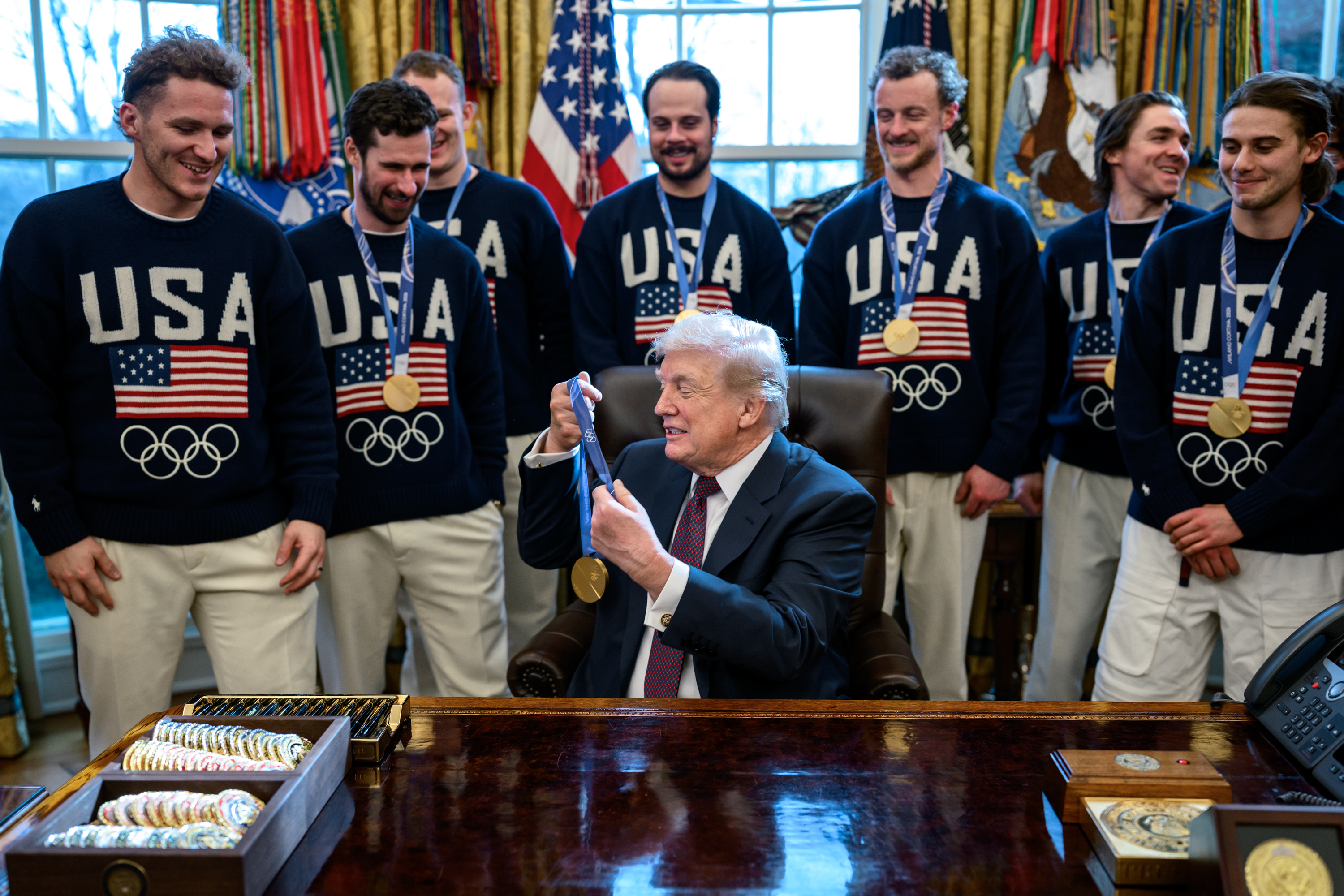
Tkachuk looks on as President Trump inspects his gold medal during their White House visit in February 2026

As well as having American and Canadian roots, Tkachuk is of Ukrainian descent on both his maternal and paternal sides. The surname "Tkachuk" translates to weaver in Ukrainian. He is also of Irish ancestry on his paternal side.

The Tkachuk family has been referred to as one branch of "a giant hockey family tree" and Tkachuk is related to several other current and former NHL players and league industry members through both his father's family, originally from Boston, Massachusetts, and his mother's family, of Winnipeg, Manitoba. Tkachuk is a first cousin once removed of former NHL player and general manager, Tom Fitzgerald, as well as a second cousin to Casey Fitzgerald and Casey's brother, Ryan, who plays in the AHL. He is also a cousin of NHL player Kevin Hayes and his brother, the late Jimmy Hayes. Tkachuk's maternal uncle is NHL player agent Craig Oster, who represents numerous NHL players, including Erik Karlsson, Mark Stone, and Evgeny Kuznetsov, as well as both Tkachuk and his brother.

While in high school at Chaminade College Preparatory School, Tkachuk became friends with Jayson Tatum, as the two were placed in the same physical education class. In 2024, both Tkachuk and Tatum won their respective championship series (the 2024 Stanley Cup Final and 2024 NBA Finals, respectively) within a week of each other. Tkachuk became engaged to girlfriend Ellie Connell in April 2024. They were married in a ceremony in St. Louis in July 2025. On March 12, 2026, Tkachuk announced that they were expecting their first child while speaking with Sean Hannity; Tkachuk stated that they were not finding out the baby's sex until birth but was hoping for a boy.

He has one child with his wife Ellie, a daughter born on April 13, 2026.

In August 2025, Tkachuk was named to the President's Council on Sports, Fitness, and Nutrition alongside other NHL representatives such as NHL legend and Canadian Wayne Gretzky and commissioner Gary Bettman and representatives of other sports. The council is designed to help provide advice to the president on strategies and opportunities to expand participation in sports and physical fitness, with members serving two-year terms.

Tkachuk and brother Brady launched a joint podcast called "Wingmen" which hosts guests and speak about topics.

== Career statistics ==
=== Regular season and playoffs ===
| | | | Regular season | | | | | Playoffs |
| Season | Team | League | GP | G | A | Pts | PIM | GP | G | A | Pts | PIM |
|---|---|---|---|---|---|---|---|---|---|---|---|---|
| 2013–14 | US NTDP Juniors | USHL | 33 | 5 | 12 | 17 | 18 | — | — | — | — | — |
| 2013–14 | US NTDP U17 | USDP | 53 | 13 | 20 | 33 | 39 | — | — | — | — | — |
| 2014–15 | US NTDP Juniors | USHL | 24 | 13 | 20 | 33 | 75 | — | — | — | — | — |
| 2014–15 | US NTDP U18 | USDP | 65 | 38 | 57 | 95 | 114 | — | — | — | — | — |
| 2015–16 | London Knights | OHL | 57 | 30 | 77 | 107 | 80 | 18 | 20 | 20 | 40 | 42 |
| 2016–17 | Calgary Flames | NHL | 76 | 13 | 35 | 48 | 105 | 4 | 0 | 0 | 0 | 4 |
| 2017–18 | Calgary Flames | NHL | 68 | 24 | 25 | 49 | 61 | — | — | — | — | — |
| 2018–19 | Calgary Flames | NHL | 80 | 34 | 43 | 77 | 62 | 5 | 2 | 1 | 3 | 18 |
| 2019–20 | Calgary Flames | NHL | 69 | 23 | 38 | 61 | 74 | 6 | 1 | 1 | 2 | 10 |
| 2020–21 | Calgary Flames | NHL | 56 | 16 | 27 | 43 | 55 | — | — | — | — | — |
| 2021–22 | Calgary Flames | NHL | 82 | 42 | 62 | 104 | 68 | 12 | 4 | 6 | 10 | 20 |
| 2022–23 | Florida Panthers | NHL | 79 | 40 | 69 | 109 | 123 | 20 | 11 | 13 | 24 | 74 |
| 2023–24 | Florida Panthers | NHL | 80 | 26 | 62 | 88 | 88 | 24 | 6 | 16 | 22 | 31 |
| 2024–25 | Florida Panthers | NHL | 52 | 22 | 35 | 57 | 54 | 23 | 8 | 15 | 23 | 33 |
| 2025–26 | Florida Panthers | NHL | 31 | 13 | 21 | 34 | 48 | — | — | — | — | — |
| NHL totals | | | 673 | 253 | 417 | 670 | 738 | 94 | 32 | 52 | 84 | 190 |

=== International ===
| Year | Team | Event | Result | GP | G | A | Pts | PIM |
|---|---|---|---|---|---|---|---|---|
| 2014 | United States | U17 | 1st place, gold medalist(s) | 6 | 4 | 3 | 7 | 2 |
| 2015 | United States | WJC18 | 1st place, gold medalist(s) | 7 | 2 | 10 | 12 | 4 |
| 2016 | United States | WJC | 3rd place, bronze medalist(s) | 7 | 4 | 7 | 11 | 6 |
| 2025 | United States | 4NF | 2nd place, silver medalist(s) | 3 | 2 | 1 | 3 | 5 |
| 2026 | United States | OG | 1st place, gold medalist(s) | 6 | 0 | 6 | 6 | 12 |
| 2026 | United States | WC | 8th | 5 | 4 | 3 | 7 | 2 |
| Junior totals | | | | 20 | 10 | 20 | 30 | 12 |
| Senior totals | | | | 14 | 6 | 10 | 16 | 19 |

== Awards and honors ==
| Award | Year | Ref |
NHL
| NHL All-Star Game | 2020, 2023 | |
| NHL Second All-Star Team | 2022, 2023 | |
| NHL All-Star Game MVP | 2023 | |
| Stanley Cup champion | 2024, 2025 | |
| EA Sports NHL cover athlete | 2026 | |

Awards and achievements
| Preceded by Sam Bennett | Calgary Flames first-round draft pick 2016 | Succeeded by Juuso Välimäki |
