= Haydn Fleury =

Canadian ice hockey player (born 1996)

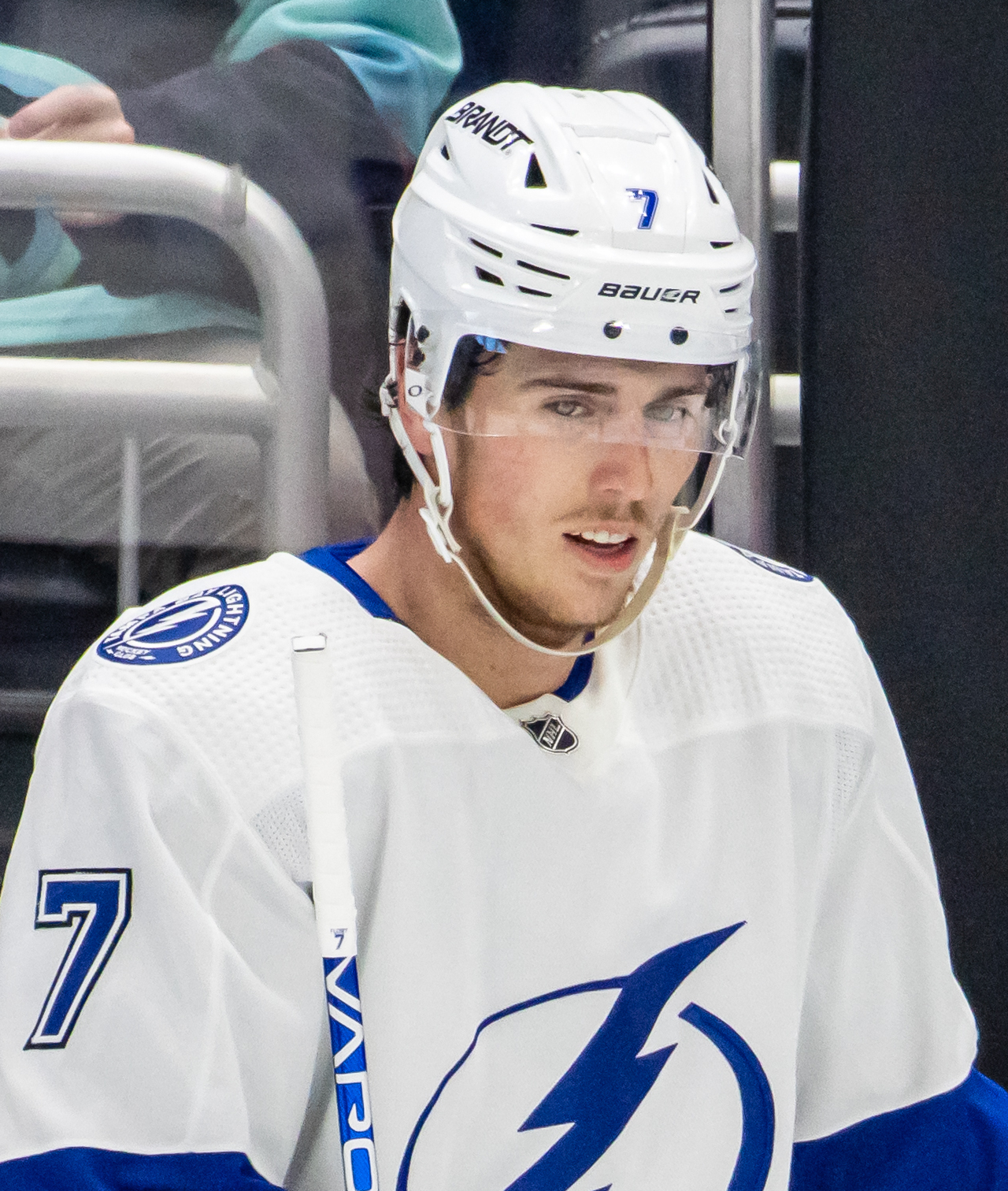
- Fleury with the Tampa Bay Lightning in 2023
- Born: July 8, 1996 (age 30) Carlyle, Saskatchewan, Canada
- Height: 6 ft 4 in (193 cm)
- Weight: 207 lb (94 kg; 14 st 11 lb)
- Position: Defence
- Shoots: Left
- NHL team Former teams: Winnipeg Jets; Carolina Hurricanes; Anaheim Ducks; Seattle Kraken; Tampa Bay Lightning
- NHL draft: 7th overall, 2014; Carolina Hurricanes
- Playing career: 2015–present

Haydn Fleury (born July 8, 1996) is a Canadian professional ice hockey player who is a defenceman for the Winnipeg Jets of the National Hockey League (NHL). Fleury was selected by the Carolina Hurricanes in the first round, seventh overall, of the 2014 NHL entry draft.

== Playing career ==
Fleury was selected by the Red Deer Rebels in the second round (43rd overall) of the 2011 WHL Bantam Draft. He was named an alternate captain for the Rebels on November 8, 2013.

Having been projected as a top 10 pick in the 2014 NHL entry draft, Fleury was selected 7th overall by the Carolina Hurricanes, the second defenseman selected in that draft. On August 7, 2014, Fleury was signed to a three-year entry-level contract with the Hurricanes.

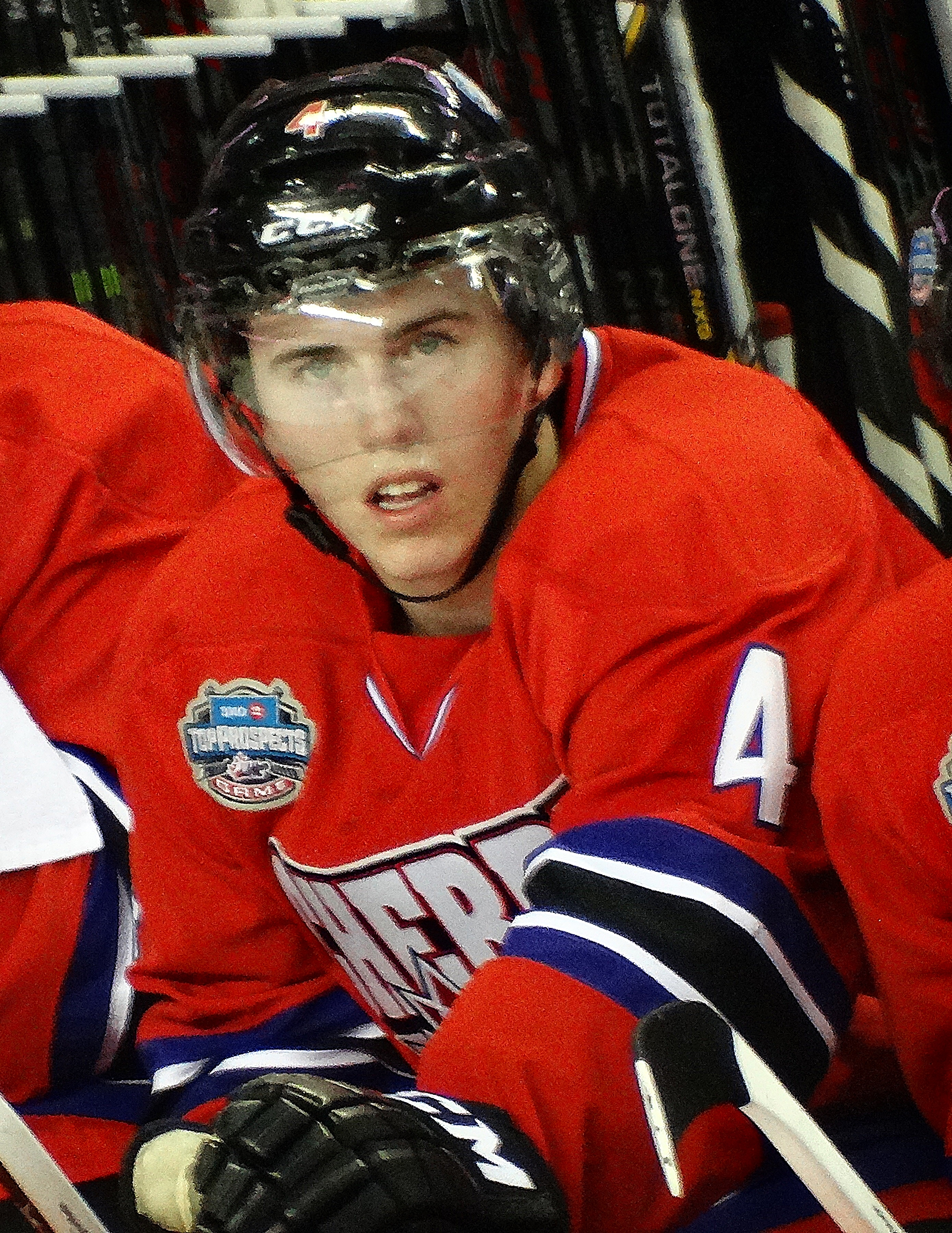
Fleury at the 2014 CHL/NHL Top Prospects Game

Fleury was reassigned to the Rebels for the 2014–15 season. On November 5, 2015, Fleury was named an alternate captains for Team WHL at the CHL Canada/Russia Series. Upon a first-round elimination from the WHL playoffs, Fleury was signed to an amateur try-out with the Hurricanes' American Hockey League affiliate, the Charlotte Checkers. On April 12, 2015, in the Checkers final home game, Fleury made his professional debut, scoring a goal, in a 4–3 victory over the Rockford IceHogs. Fleury attended the Hurricanes training camp for the 2015–16 season, then was reassigned to the Rebels for that season. He helped the team advance to the 2016 Memorial Cup, where they reached the Memorial Cup Semi-Final, losing to the Rouyn-Noranda Huskies. Fleury was named to the 2016 Memorial Cup All-Star Team.

Fleury started the 2017–18 season with the Hurricanes. On October 26, 2017, in his eighth game in the NHL, he earned his first NHL points, registering two assists in a 6–3 win against the Toronto Maple Leafs. Fleury was re-assigned to the Checkers on January 25, 2018, after recording 6 points, all assists, in 39 NHL games. However, he was recalled back to the Hurricanes three days later. After the Hurricanes failed to make the post-season, Fleury was assigned to the Checkers to help them in the 2018 Calder Cup playoffs.

The following 2018–19 season, Fleury again made the Hurricanes' opening night roster, but was re-assigned to the Charlotte Checkers on October 17. He was recalled to the NHL on October 31, only to suffer a concussion on November 23 in a game against the Florida Panthers. Fleury was officially placed on injured reserve by the Hurricanes on November 29. Fleury was activated from injured reserve on December 2, 2018, before a game against the Los Angeles Kings.

On July 16, 2019, the Hurricanes re-signed Fleury to a one-year, $850,000 contract extension.

In the pandemic delayed 2020–21 season, Fleury continued to play with the Hurricanes in a third-pairing role. Unable to replicate his previous season offensive totals, Fleury posted just 1 goal in 35 regular season games before he was traded at the trade deadline to the Anaheim Ducks in exchange for Jani Hakanpää and a 2022 sixth-round draft pick on April 12, 2021.

On July 21, 2021, Fleury was selected from the Ducks at the 2021 NHL expansion draft by the Seattle Kraken, reuniting him with his brother Cale.

As a free agent after the inaugural season with the Kraken, Fleury was signed to a two-year, $1.525 million contract by the Tampa Bay Lightning on July 13, 2022.

On July 3, 2024, Fleury signed as a free agent to a one-year, two-way contract with the Winnipeg Jets. Later, on March 15th, 2026- Fleury scored his first goal as a Winnipeg Jet in a 3-2 Jets victory over the St. Louis Blues. It was his first goal in 2 years- Fleury last scored a goal on December 19th, 2023- when he was a member of the Tampa Bay Lightning.

== Personal life ==
Growing up in Carlyle, Saskatchewan, Fleury knew fellow Carlyle native and future NHL player Brenden Morrow, who was then playing junior hockey with the Portland Winterhawks. As a teenager, Morrow babysat Fleury, who was then a toddler. Morrow and Fleury later played in the Under-17 tournament exactly 17 years apart.

Fleury has a younger brother, Cale, who was taken 87th overall in the 2017 NHL entry draft by the Montreal Canadiens.

== Career statistics ==
=== Regular season and playoffs ===
			Regular season					Playoffs
Season	Team	League	GP	G	A	Pts	PIM	GP	G	A	Pts	PIM
2010–11	Notre Dame Argos	SMHL	3	0	1	1	0	—	—	—	—	—
2011–12	Notre Dame Argos	SMHL	39	6	15	21	60	8	1	4	5	8
2011–12	Red Deer Rebels	WHL	4	0	0	0	0	—	—	—	—	—
2012–13	Red Deer Rebels	WHL	66	4	15	19	21	9	0	2	2	4
2013–14	Red Deer Rebels	WHL	70	8	38	46	46	—	—	—	—	—
2014–15	Red Deer Rebels	WHL	63	6	22	28	63	5	1	1	2	2
2014–15	Charlotte Checkers	AHL	1	1	0	1	0	—	—	—	—	—
2015–16	Red Deer Rebels	WHL	56	12	29	41	50	17	4	5	9	20
2016–17	Charlotte Checkers	AHL	69	7	19	26	8	5	0	0	0	0
2017–18	Carolina Hurricanes	NHL	67	0	8	8	14	—	—	—	—	—
2017–18	Charlotte Checkers	AHL	3	1	1	2	0	8	2	2	4	14
2018–19	Carolina Hurricanes	NHL	20	0	1	1	2	9	0	0	0	2
2018–19	Charlotte Checkers	AHL	28	2	8	10	32	11	2	4	6	8
2019–20	Carolina Hurricanes	NHL	45	4	10	14	8	8	2	0	2	6
2020–21	Carolina Hurricanes	NHL	35	1	0	1	6	—	—	—	—	—
2020–21	Anaheim Ducks	NHL	12	2	1	3	2	—	—	—	—	—
2021–22	Seattle Kraken	NHL	36	2	2	4	13	—	—	—	—	—
2022–23	Tampa Bay Lightning	NHL	29	0	1	1	14	1	0	0	0	0
2023–24	Tampa Bay Lightning	NHL	24	1	4	5	20	—	—	—	—	—
2023–24	Syracuse Crunch	AHL	5	0	0	0	6	—	—	—	—	—
2024–25	Winnipeg Jets	NHL	39	0	7	7	6	8	0	2	2	8
2025–26	Winnipeg Jets	NHL	38	2	2	4	12	—	—	—	—	—
NHL totals			345	12	36	48	97	26	2	2	4	16

=== International ===
Year	Team	Event	Result	GP	G	A	Pts	PIM
2013	Canada Western	U17	9th	5	1	2	3	14
2013	Canada	IH18	1st place, gold medalist(s)	5	1	0	1	6
2014	Canada	U18	3rd place, bronze medalist(s)	7	0	1	1	4
2016	Canada	WJC	6th	5	0	1	1	0
Junior totals				22	2	4	6	24

== Awards and honours ==
Honours	Year
CHL
CHL/NHL Top Prospects Game (Team Cherry)	2014
Memorial Cup All-Star Team	2016
AHL
Calder Cup (Charlotte Checkers)	2019

Awards and achievements
Preceded by Elias Lindholm	Carolina Hurricanes first-round draft pick 2014	Succeeded by Noah Hanifin
