= Marchant Crane Centrium =

Multi-use indoor arena in Red Deer, Alberta

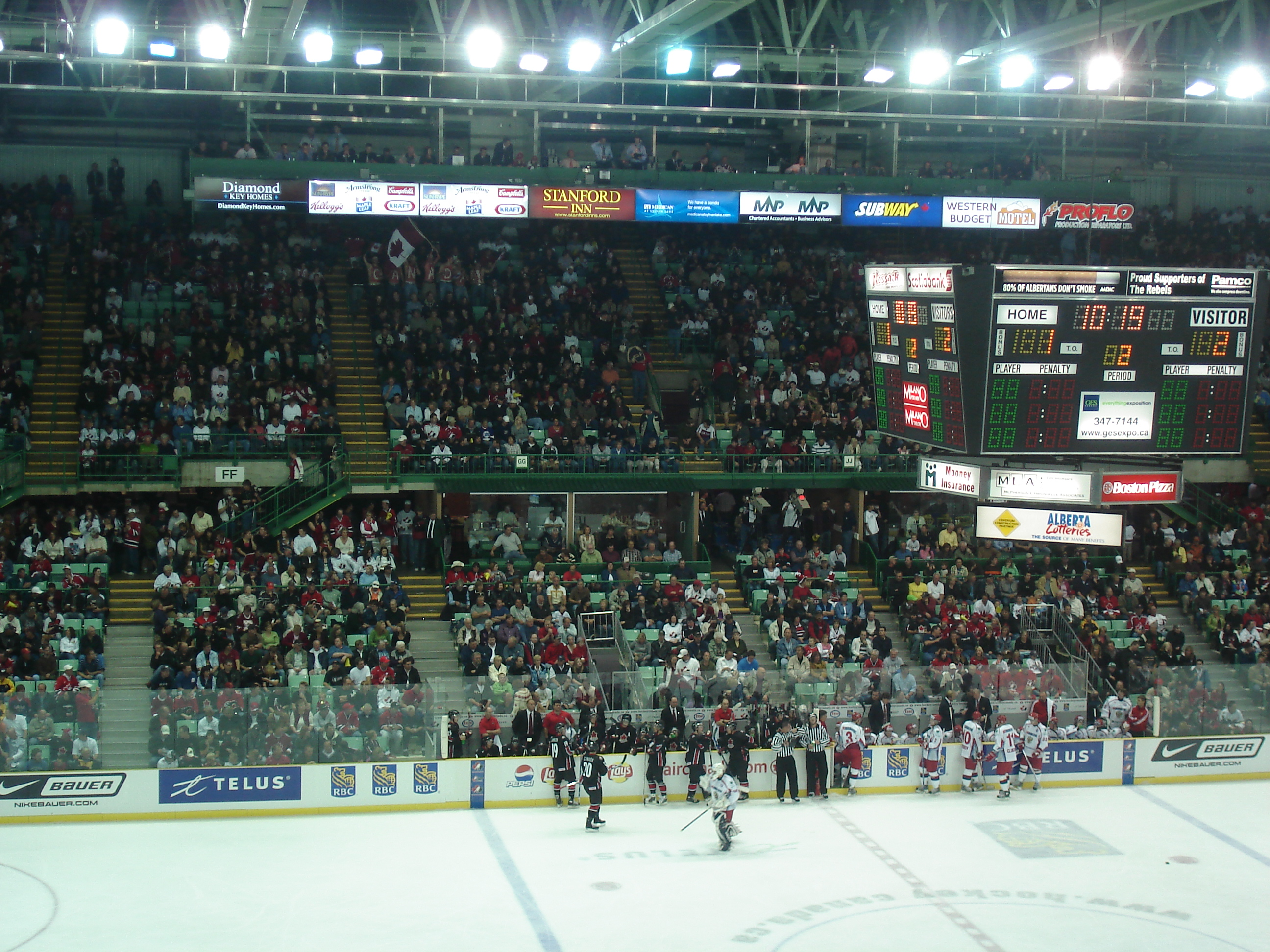

- Location within Alberta Location within Canada
- Former names: Red Deer Centrium (1991–1999); ENMAX Centrium (1999–2019); Peavey Mart Centrium (2021-2025); Marchant Crane Centrium (2025-Current)
- Location: 4847A 19 Street; Red Deer, Alberta; T4R 2N7
- Coordinates: 52.22826°N 113.805903°W
- Owner: Westerner Exposition Association
- Operator: Westerner Exposition Association
- Capacity: Hockey: 7,111; Concerts: 7,819

Construction
- Groundbreaking: 1989
- Opened: 1991
- Cost: CA$23 million ($45.6 million in 2025 dollars)
- Architects: PBK Architects Inc. Group 2 Architecture Engineering Ltd.
- Structural engineer: Bearden Engineering Consultants Ltd.
- General contractor: Forest Contract Management

Tenant
- Red Deer Rebels (WHL) (1992–present)

The Marchant Crane Centrium (formerly Peavey Mart Centrium) is a two-tier 7,111-seat multi-purpose arena in Red Deer, Alberta, Canada. The arena is a multi-use facility accommodating national events, concerts, hockey, rodeo, trade shows, and even graduations. It was built in 1991 and is the home arena of the Red Deer Rebels hockey team. The arena can hold a maximum of 7,819 people when floor seating is used, making it the third largest WHL arena not shared with an NHL team. "Half house" seating is 3,357 when floor to ceiling divider curtains are used to mask off unused seating.

Located in Westerner Park in the south end of Red Deer, the Marchant Crane Centrium is the largest indoor venue in Red Deer and Central Alberta. Besides hockey, it also hosts concerts, basketball, motor sports, ice shows, major curling events, circuses, boxing, rodeos, professional wrestling, trade shows and conventions.

Various notable artists have performed here, including Snoop Dogg, Mötley Crüe, Nickelback, Hilary Duff, Elton John, Bryan Adams, Billy Talent, Skillet, Rush, Trooper, Hedley and most recent the band Aqua.

It was the primary site for the 1995 World Junior Ice Hockey Championships, the 2004 and 2012 Scotties Tournament of Hearts and Game 7 of the 2007 Super Series.

In 2012, the Centrium expansion was completed. The expansion added 13 more luxury suites, a new 40-seat club suite and an additional 1,000 seats.

The Centrium hosted the 2016 Memorial Cup. It was to host the 2021 World Junior Ice Hockey Championships with Rogers Place in Edmonton, but the event was held behind closed doors in a bio-secure bubble in Edmonton due to the COVID-19 pandemic. The tournament scheduled for the Centrium again in 2022, but was curtailed due to COVID-19. A replay was scheduled for August 2022, but it was decided that the tournament would once again be held exclusively in Edmonton. However, it will end up cohosting the 2027 World Junior Ice Hockey Championships alongside Edmonton.

After the expiration of a previous sponsorship with ENMAX, Red Deer-based Peavey Mart acquired the naming rights to the Centrium in July 2021 under a five-year deal.

Peavey Mart closed all stores in 2025, resulting in the cessation of the naming rights agreement. On June 5, 2025, Westener Park announced a new naming rights agreement with Sylvan Lake-based equipment company Marchant Crane, renaming the arena Marchant Crane Centrium.

== Dimensions ==
- Ice surface: 200 by 85 feet (61 m × 26 m), 17,000 square feet (1,600 m^{2})
- Arena level, seating removed: 50,000 square feet (4,600 m^{2})
- Concourse Level: 30,000 square feet (2,800 m^{2})
- Height: 52 feet (16 m) to roof truss
