= Michael Amadio =

Canadian ice hockey player (born 1996)

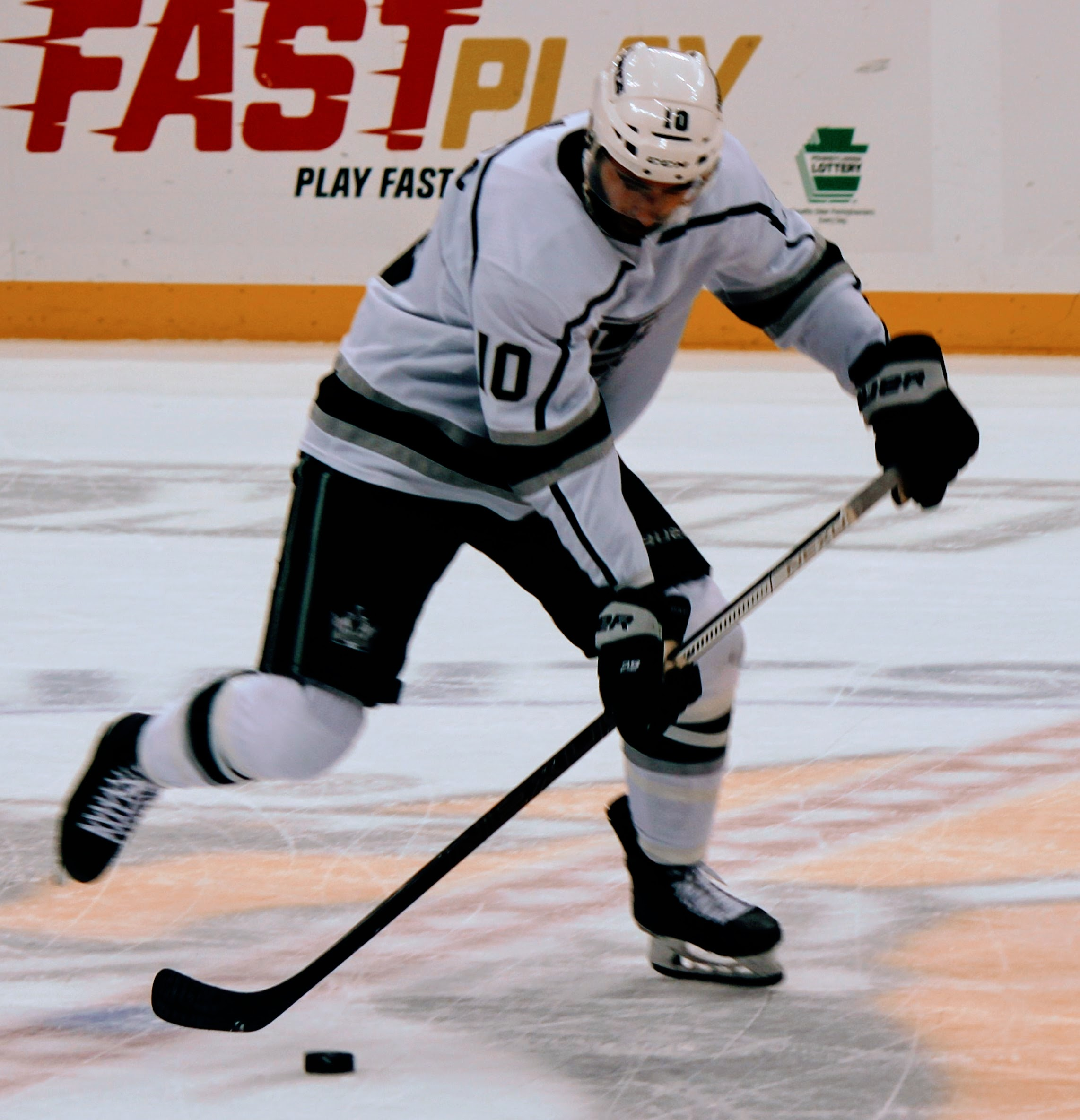
- Amadio with the Los Angeles Kings in 2019
- Born: May 13, 1996 (age 30) Sault Ste. Marie, Ontario, Canada
- Height: 6 ft 1 in (185 cm)
- Weight: 206 lb (93 kg; 14 st 10 lb)
- Position: Forward
- Shoots: Right
- NHL team Former teams: Ottawa Senators; Los Angeles Kings; Toronto Maple Leafs; Vegas Golden Knights
- NHL draft: 90th overall, 2014; Los Angeles Kings
- Playing career: 2016–present

Michael Amadio (born May 13, 1996) is a Canadian professional ice hockey player who is a forward for the Ottawa Senators of the National Hockey League (NHL). Amadio was selected by the Los Angeles Kings, 90th overall, in the 2014 NHL entry draft. He has also played for the Toronto Maple Leafs and the Vegas Golden Knights. He is a one-time Stanley Cup champion, which he won with the Golden Knights in 2023.

== Playing career ==
=== Major junior ===
Amadio was a prolific scorer playing in Northern Ontario's bantam and midget levels, before he was selected by the Brampton Battalion of the Ontario Hockey League (OHL) in the second round, 36th overall, of the 2012 OHL Priority Selection draft. In his OHL rookie season in 2012–13 he appeared in 63 games, scoring six goals, 13 assists and 19 points. In the offseason the Battalion were relocated to North Bay, Ontario to become the North Bay Battalion. In his second season with the franchise in 2013–14, Amadio tallied 12 goals and 38 points in 64 games and added another four goals and nine points in North Bay's 22 playoff games. He returned to the Battalion for the 2014–15 season, playing in 68 games, scoring 24 goals and 71 points.

Ahead of the 2015–16 season, Amadio was named the captain of the Battalion. He scored a franchise record of 50 goals that season in 68 games, registering 98 points and was nominated for the Red Tilson Trophy and William Hanley Trophy. Amadio was named the winner of the William Hanley Trophy on April 22, 2016, and was later selected for the OHL Second All-Star Team.

=== Professional ===
==== Los Angeles Kings ====
Amadio was selected by the Los Angeles Kings of the National Hockey League (NHL) with the last pick in the third round, 90th overall, of the 2014 NHL entry draft. On March 13, 2016, Amadio was signed by the Kings to a three-year, entry-level contract. He was then reassigned to join their American Hockey League (AHL) affiliate, the Ontario Reign for their playoff run following the 2015–16 season. In 11 post-season games he contributed with one goal and five points. He was assigned to the Reign for the 2016–17 season, playing in 68 games, scoring 16 goals and 41 points. After beginning the 2017–18 season with the Reign, Amadio received his first recall to the Kings on October 26, 2017. He made his NHL debut that night in a 4–0 shutout victory over the Montreal Canadiens. In his fourth game, Amadio registered his first NHL goal, scoring in a 5–3 victory over the Toronto Maple Leafs on November 2, 2017. He was returned to the Reign, going on a 17-game point streak in the AHL but was recalled in January and remained with the Kings into March. He recorded his first multi-point game on January 21, 2018, when he scored a powerplay goal and assisted on another powerplay goal by Tanner Pearson in a 4–2 victory over the New York Rangers. He played in 32 regular season games with Ontario, scoring 11 goals and 35 points and in 37 games with Los Angeles, tallying four goals and eight points. He made his NHL playoff debut in the 2018 Stanley Cup playoffs on April 13. He made one appearance in the first round series versus the Vegas Golden Knights, registering his first NHL playoff point assisting on Paul LaDue's second period goal. He also appeared in the Reign's 2018 Calder Cup playoffs run, playing in four games, scoring one goal and four points.

After attending the Kings training camp, Amadio was named to their NHL roster to begin the 2018–19 season. After playing in 28 games, Amadio was reassigned to the Ontario Reign. Despite recalls throughout the season, he was again assigned to the Ontario Reign after the Kings failed to clinch a post season berth. He made 43 appearances with the Kings, marking six goals and 13 points and added another eight goals and 26 points in 28 games with Ontario. In the 2019 off-season Amadio was a restricted free agent, but signed a two-year contract to remain with the Kings. He once again made the Kings opening night roster out of training camp in 2019–20. He played in 68 games with Los Angeles, scoring six goals and 16 points, before the NHL suspended the season due to the COVID-19 pandemic on March 12, 2020. He began the pandemic-shortened 2020–21 season with the Kings, and appeared in 20 games, registering only two assists. He was placed on waivers on March 19 and went unclaimed. He was then assigned to the Kings' taxi squad. He also appeared for the Reign, where he played two games, adding two assists. His inconsistent play and a number of younger forwards coming up through the Kings' minor league system made him expendable.

==== Ottawa Senators and Toronto Maple Leafs ====
On March 29, 2021, Amadio was traded to the Ottawa Senators in exchange for defenceman Christian Wolanin. He made his Senators debut on April 8, in a 3–1 loss to the Edmonton Oilers. He registered his first point with Ottawa in the next game, assisting on Tim Stützle's goal in a 6–5 loss to the Toronto Maple Leafs. He made five appearances with the Senators following the trade, registering the one assist. A restricted free agent at the end of the season, Ottawa did not extend a qualifying offer to Amadio, making him an unrestricted free agent.

Amadio signed a one-year, two-way contract with the Toronto Maple Leafs on July 29, 2021. After Ilya Mikheyev was injured during training camp, Amadio beat out Adam Brooks for the final lineup spot on the Maple Leafs opening night roster to commence the 2021–22 season. In three games with the Maple Leafs, he went scoreless.

==== Vegas Golden Knights ====
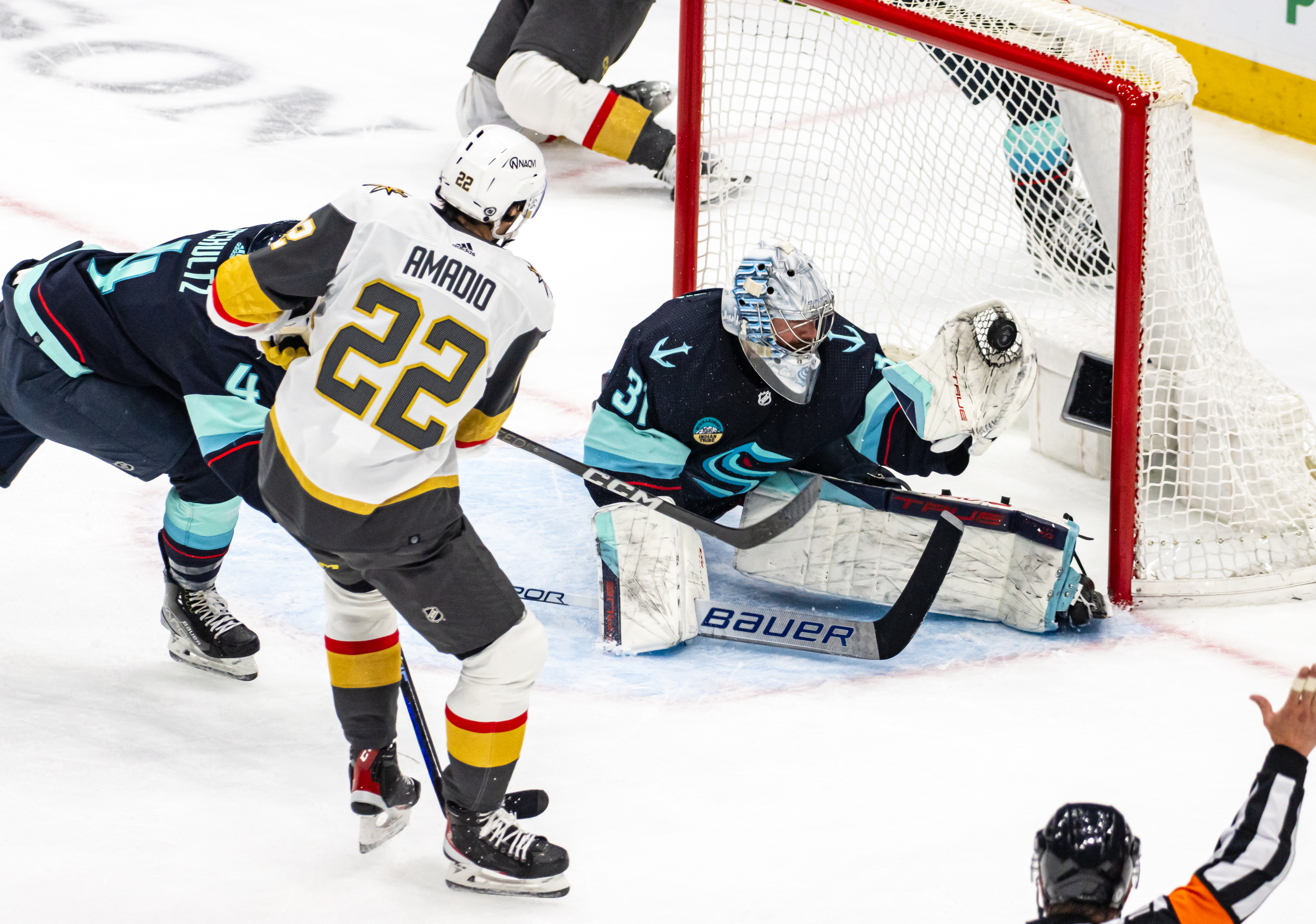
Amadio shooting the puck at Philipp Grubauer of the Seattle Kraken in the 2023–24 season

On October 29, 2021, Amadio was placed on waivers by the Maple Leafs and claimed the following day by the Vegas Golden Knights. Vegas claimed him after placing Nolan Patrick on injured reserve and were dealing with a shortage of healthy forwards. He made his Golden Knights debut on November 2 in a 4–0 shutout loss to his former team, the Maple Leafs. He registered his first point with Vegas on December 1, assisting on William Carrier's second period goal in a 6–5 loss to the Anaheim Ducks. He scored his first goal for the Golden Knights in the next game, a two-point effort in a 7–1 win over the Arizona Coyotes. On January 30, 2022, the Golden Knights signed Amadio to a two-year, $1.525 million contract extension. He marked a three-point night scoring one goal and registering two assists in a 5–4 victory over the Anaheim Ducks on March 5. He finished the season playing in 53 games with Vegas, scoring 11 goals and 18 points.

Amadio began the 2022–23 season with the Golden Knights and made their opening night roster. He was not expected to be anything more than a depth forward. He changed his game in Vegas from that of a playmaker to a more direct style and soon made earned himself a role that saw his playing time increase. He finished the season with 16 goals and 27 points in 67 games. The Golden Knights made the 2023 Stanley Cup playoffs and Amadio scored the game-winning second overtime goal in game three of the first round series against the Winnipeg Jets on April 22, 2023. Amadio finished the playoffs with five goals and ten points including a goal in the series-clinching game five of the 2023 Stanley Cup Final, where the Golden Knights won the Stanley Cup. On July 19, Amadio was awarded the key to the city of Sault Ste. Marie by Mayor Matthew Shoemaker when he brought the Stanley Cup to the city.

In 2023–24 Amadio was now an established regular on the Golden Knights as the team made few changes to the roster that won them the Stanley Cup. A bottom-six forward with Vegas, he played in 73 games, scoring 14 goals and 27 points. The Golden Knights made the 2024 Stanley Cup playoffs and faced the Dallas Stars in the first round. Their defence of the Stanley Cup faltered as they were eliminated by the Stars. Amadio appeared in four playoff games, scoring one goal and one assist.

==== Ottawa Senators ====
On July 1, 2024, Amadio left the Golden Knights after three seasons and returned to the Senators as an unrestricted free agent, signing a three-year, $7.8 million deal. He registered his first goal with the Senators on November 9 in a 3–2 victory over the Boston Bruins. He mostly saw time on the team's third line alongside Shane Pinto and Ridly Greig, often matched against the opponent's top line. The line was often Ottawa's most consistent during the season and in 72 games, he tallied 11 goals and 27 points. The Senators qualified for the playoffs and faced the Toronto Maple Leafs in the opening round. The Senators were eliminated in six games in their best-of-seven series. In the six games, Amadio tallied one assist. In his second season in Ottawa in 2025–26, Amadio was again on third line with Pinto, but joined by Claude Giroux. On December 11, 2025, he recorded a three-point game, scoring one goal and assisting on two others by Giroux and Tim Stützle. In 81 games, he tallied 15 goals and 35 points. The Senators made the playoffs again, but were swept in the first round by the Carolina Hurricanes.

== Career statistics ==
			Regular season					Playoffs
Season	Team	League	GP	G	A	Pts	PIM	GP	G	A	Pts	PIM
2010–11	Soo Greyhounds	NOBHL	39	60	74	134	16	6	10	9	19	2
2011–12	Sault Ste. Marie North Stars	GNML	29	32	30	62	12	11	5	9	14	6
2012–13	Brampton Battalion	OHL	63	6	13	19	8	5	0	0	0	0
2013–14	North Bay Battalion	OHL	64	12	26	38	14	22	4	5	9	2
2014–15	North Bay Battalion	OHL	68	24	47	71	18	15	6	9	15	4
2015–16	North Bay Battalion	OHL	68	50	48	98	40	11	12	6	18	10
2015–16	Ontario Reign	AHL	—	—	—	—	—	11	1	4	5	0
2016–17	Ontario Reign	AHL	68	16	25	41	4	5	2	0	2	0
2017–18	Ontario Reign	AHL	32	11	24	35	12	4	1	3	4	2
2017–18	Los Angeles Kings	NHL	37	4	4	8	8	1	0	1	1	0
2018–19	Los Angeles Kings	NHL	43	6	7	13	6	—	—	—	—	—
2018–19	Ontario Reign	AHL	28	8	18	26	12	—	—	—	—	—
2019–20	Los Angeles Kings	NHL	68	6	10	16	10	—	—	—	—	—
2020–21	Los Angeles Kings	NHL	20	0	2	2	2	—	—	—	—	—
2020–21	Ontario Reign	AHL	2	0	2	2	0	—	—	—	—	—
2020–21	Ottawa Senators	NHL	5	0	1	1	2	—	—	—	—	—
2021–22	Toronto Maple Leafs	NHL	3	0	0	0	0	—	—	—	—	—
2021–22	Vegas Golden Knights	NHL	56	11	7	18	15	—	—	—	—	—
2022–23	Vegas Golden Knights	NHL	67	16	11	27	12	16	5	5	10	4
2023–24	Vegas Golden Knights	NHL	73	14	13	27	16	4	1	1	2	0
2024–25	Ottawa Senators	NHL	72	11	16	27	18	6	0	1	1	2
2025–26	Ottawa Senators	NHL	81	15	20	35	18	4	0	0	0	2
NHL totals			522	83	91	174	107	31	6	8	14	8

== Awards and honours ==
Award	Year
OHL
William Hanley Trophy	2016
Second All-Star Team	2016
NHL
Stanley Cup champion	2023
