= Nicolas Hague =

Canadian ice hockey player (born 1998)

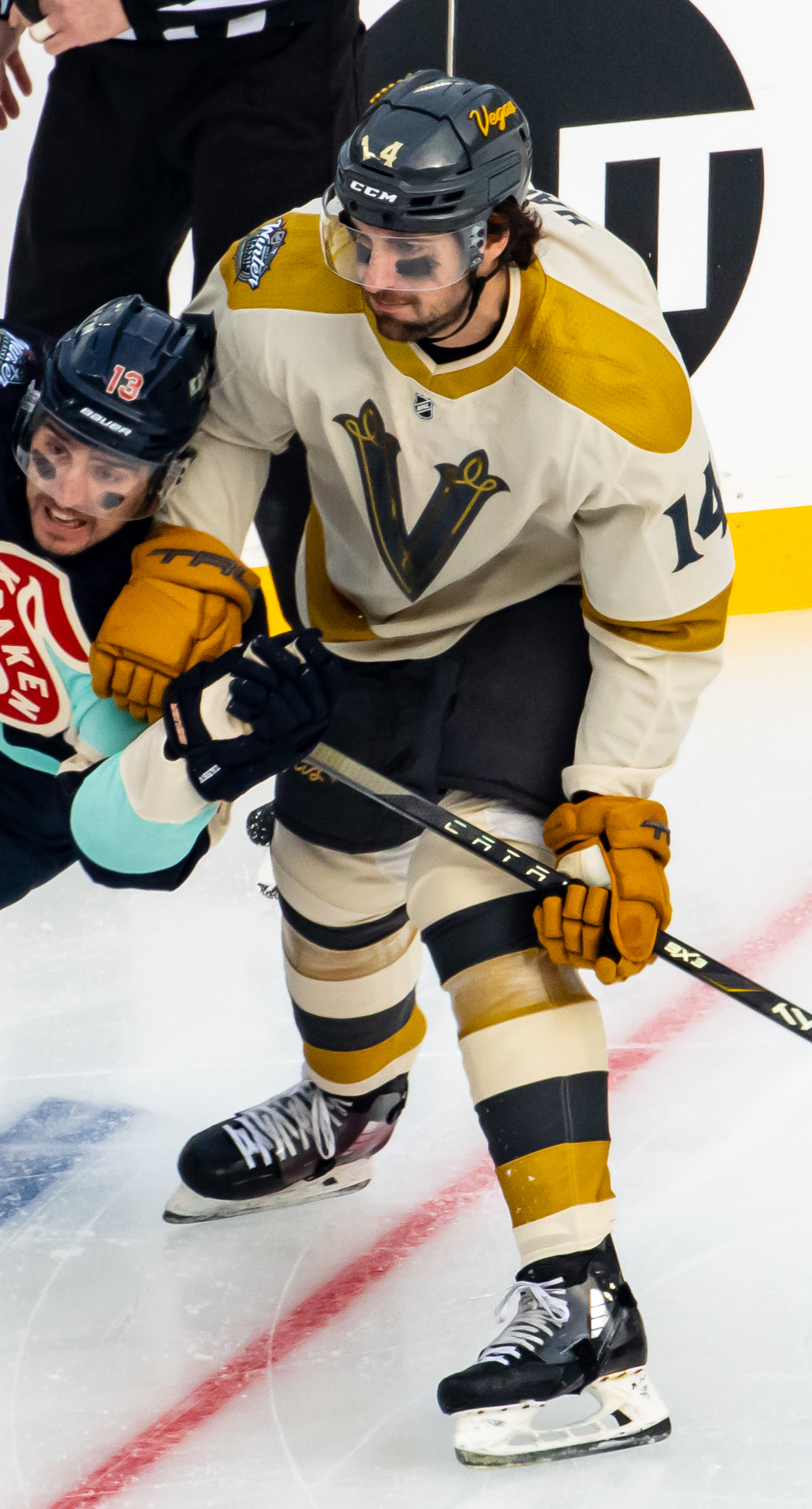
- Hague with the Vegas Golden Knights during the 2024 Winter Classic
- Born: December 5, 1998 (age 27) Kitchener, Ontario, Canada
- Height: 6 ft 6 in (198 cm)
- Weight: 245 lb (111 kg; 17 st 7 lb)
- Position: Defence
- Shoots: Left
- NHL team Former teams: Nashville Predators; Vegas Golden Knights
- NHL draft: 34th overall, 2017; Vegas Golden Knights
- Playing career: 2018–present

Nicolas Hague (born December 5, 1998) is a Canadian ice hockey player who is a defenceman for the Nashville Predators of the National Hockey League (NHL). Hague was selected 34th overall by the Vegas Golden Knights in the 2017 NHL entry draft, with whom he won the Stanley Cup in 2023.

== Playing career ==
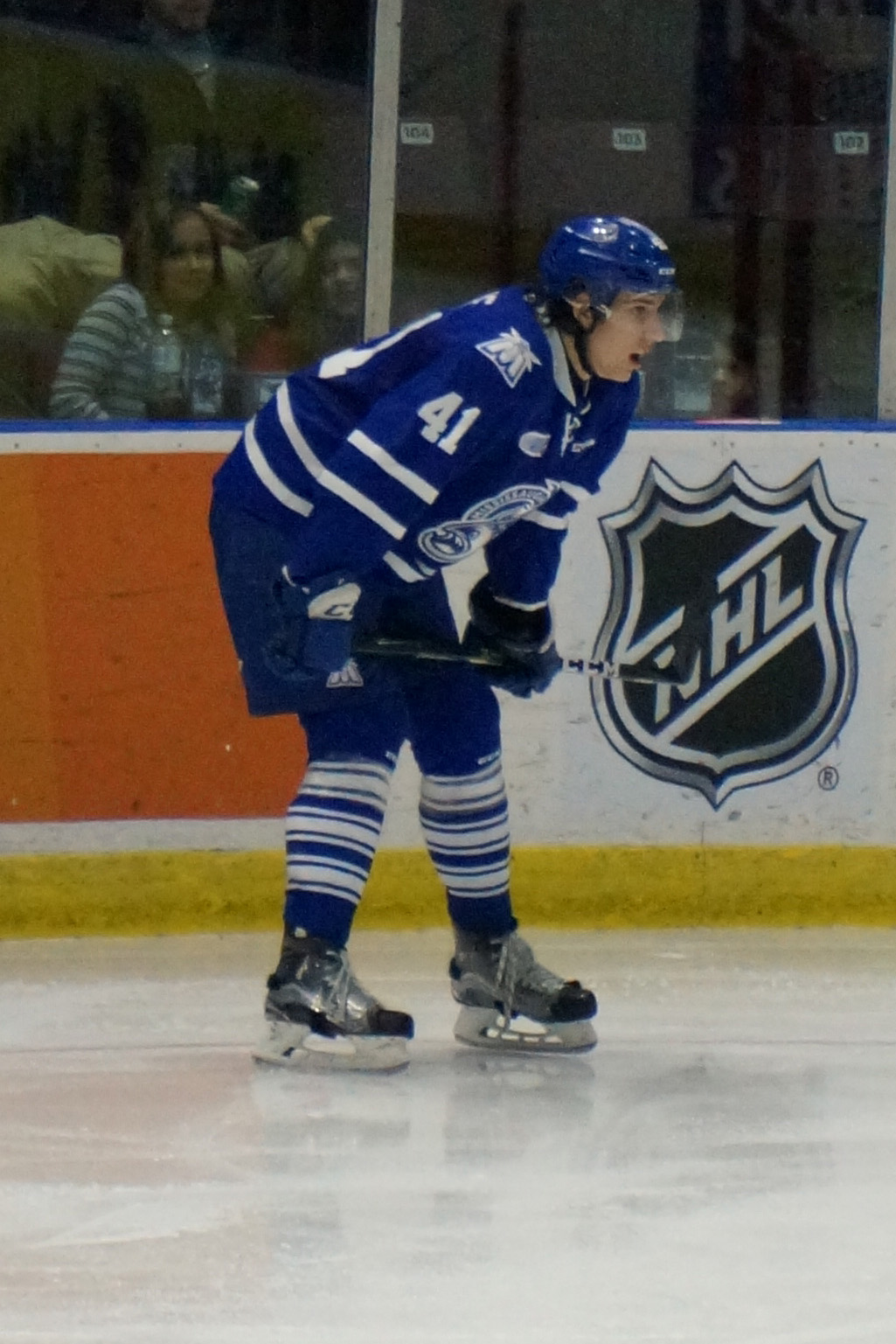
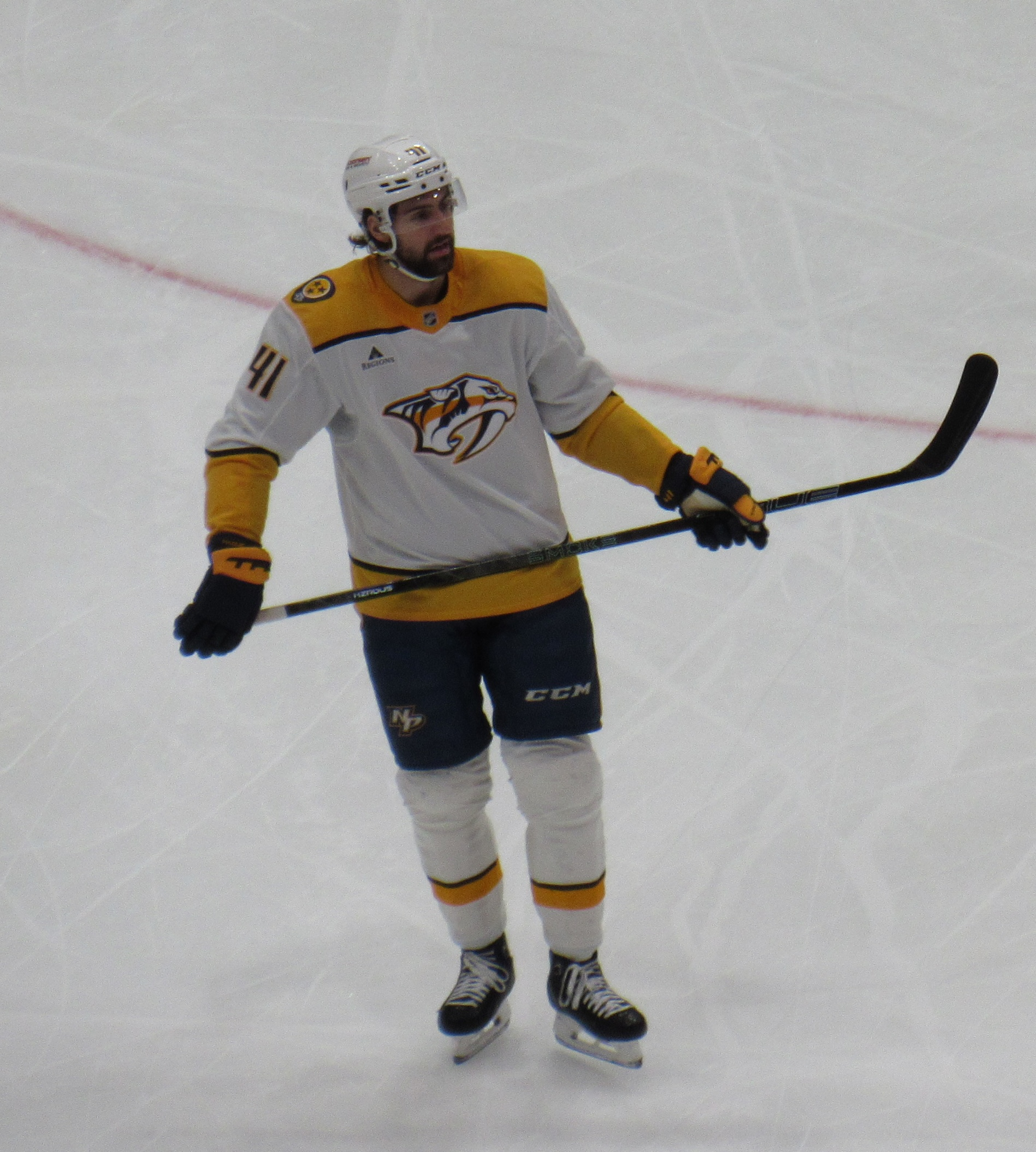
Hague with the Mississauga Steelheads in 2017 (left), and Nashville Predators in 2026 (right)

Hague was drafted by the Mississauga Steelheads in the second round of the 2014 OHL Draft. Hague was later drafted 34th overall by the Vegas Golden Knights in the 2017 NHL entry draft.

Hague signed a three-year entry-level contract with the Golden Knights on September 29, 2017, and attended their training camp before rejoining the Steelheads for the 2017–18 season. Following a 2017–18 season where Hague led his team in scoring and set a Steelhead single season record for defencemen (78 points), Hague was awarded the Max Kaminsky Trophy, which is awarded to the OHL's Most Outstanding Defenceman of the Year. On April 8, following the Steelheads elimination from the 2018 OHL Playoffs, the Golden Knights assigned him to their American Hockey League (AHL) affiliate, the Chicago Wolves.

On January 21, 2020, Hague scored his first career NHL goal against the Boston Bruins on goaltender Jaroslav Halák.

With the Golden Knights becoming known for aggressively trading draft picks and drafted players, Hague was notably the only player drafted by the organization to play in the 2023 Stanley Cup Final. Hague scored a goal in the series-clinching Game 5 against the Florida Panthers to help the Golden Knights win the Stanley Cup.

On June 30, 2025, Hague was traded to the Nashville Predators alongside a conditional third-round pick in 2027, in exchange for Jeremy Lauzon and Colton Sissons, subsequently signing a four-year, $22 million extension with Nashville.

== Career statistics ==
=== Regular season and playoffs ===
			Regular season					Playoffs
Season	Team	League	GP	G	A	Pts	PIM	GP	G	A	Pts	PIM
2014–15	Kitchener Dutchmen	GOJHL	43	3	8	11	70	10	3	9	12	20
2015–16	Mississauga Steelheads	OHL	66	14	10	24	84	7	0	2	2	13
2016–17	Mississauga Steelheads	OHL	65	18	28	46	107	18	1	11	12	19
2017–18	Mississauga Steelheads	OHL	67	35	43	78	105	6	0	4	4	12
2017–18	Chicago Wolves	AHL	5	0	1	1	7	3	0	0	0	4
2018–19	Chicago Wolves	AHL	75	13	19	32	38	22	4	7	11	31
2019–20	Vegas Golden Knights	NHL	38	1	10	11	32	—	—	—	—	—
2019–20	Chicago Wolves	AHL	21	1	9	10	12	—	—	—	—	—
2020–21	Vegas Golden Knights	NHL	52	5	12	17	31	10	1	1	2	6
2021–22	Vegas Golden Knights	NHL	52	4	10	14	38	—	—	—	—	—
2022–23	Vegas Golden Knights	NHL	81	3	14	17	51	22	2	4	6	37
2023–24	Vegas Golden Knights	NHL	73	2	10	12	43	1	0	0	0	0
2024–25	Vegas Golden Knights	NHL	68	5	7	12	40	11	0	2	2	9
2025–26	Nashville Predators	NHL	62	3	12	15	47	—	—	—	—	—
NHL totals			426	23	75	98	282	44	3	7	10	52

=== International ===
Year	Team	Event	Result	GP	G	A	Pts	PIM
2014	Canada White	U17	5th	5	2	0	2	4
2016	Canada	U18	4th	7	0	2	2	4
Junior totals				12	2	2	4	8

== Awards and honors ==
Award	Year
OHL
Max Kaminsky Trophy	2017–18
NHL
Stanley Cup champion	2023
