= Ivan Barbashev =

Russian ice hockey player (born 1995)

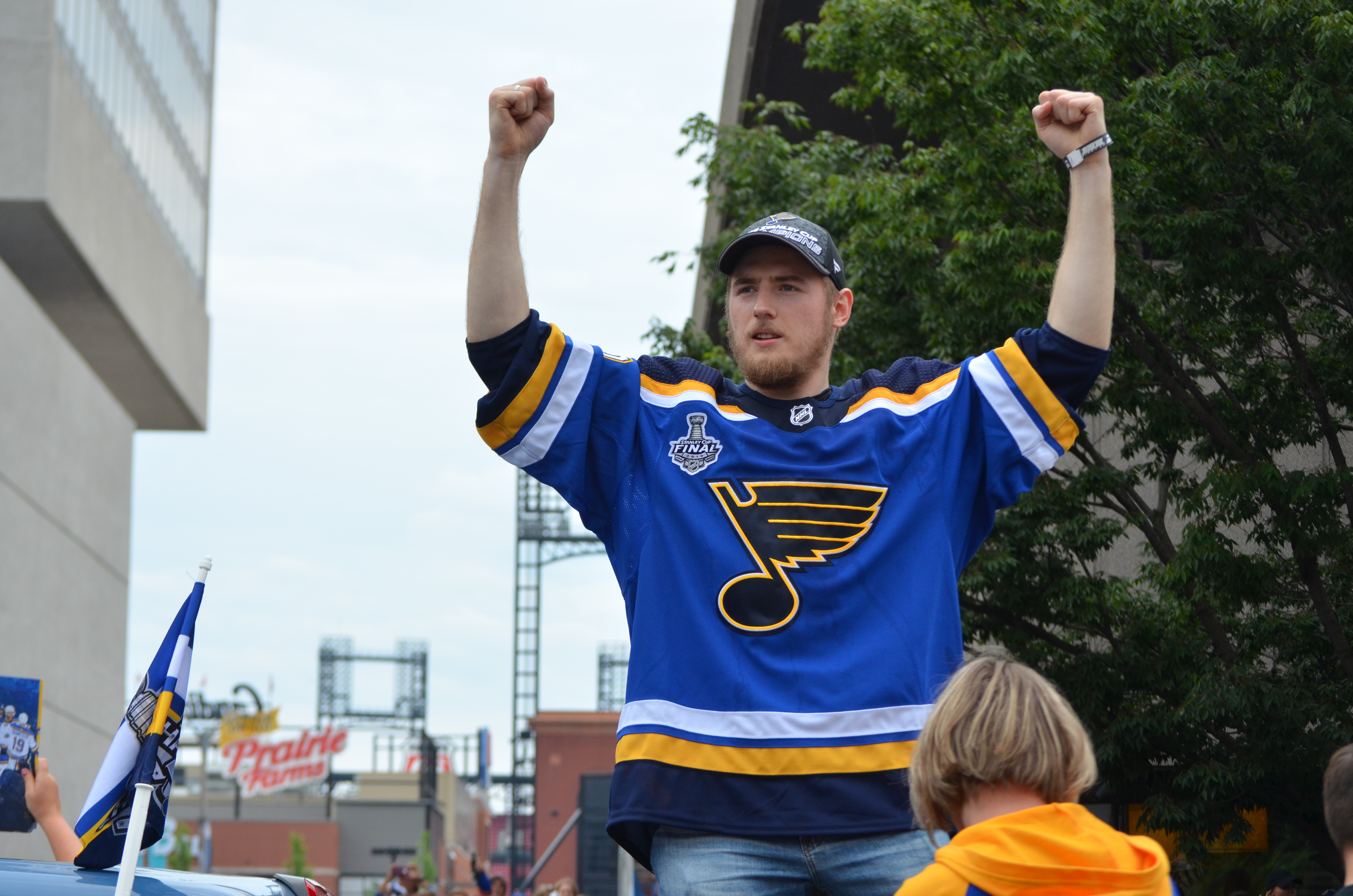
- Barbashev with the St. Louis Blues in 2019
- Born: 14 December 1995 (age 30) Moscow, Russia
- Height: 6 ft 0 in (183 cm)
- Weight: 203 lb (92 kg; 14 st 7 lb)
- Position: Forward
- Shoots: Left
- NHL team Former teams: Vegas Golden Knights; St. Louis Blues
- NHL draft: 33rd overall, 2014; St. Louis Blues
- Playing career: 2015–present

Ivan Dmitrievich Barbashev (Russian: Иван Дмитриевич Барбашёв; born 14 December 1995) is a Russian professional ice hockey player who is a forward for the Vegas Golden Knights of the National Hockey League (NHL). Barbashev was selected by the St. Louis Blues in the second round, 33rd overall, of the 2014 NHL entry draft.

Born and raised in Russia, Barbashev started playing hockey there before moving to North America in 2012, where he joined the Moncton Wildcats of the Quebec Major Junior Hockey League (QMJHL). He spent three seasons in the QMJHL before making his professional debut in the AHL, and made his NHL debut in 2017. Internationally, Barbashev has played for the Russian national junior team at several tournaments, winning a silver and bronze medal in consecutive World Junior Championships. Barbashev is a two-time Stanley Cup champion, winning with the Blues in 2019 and the Golden Knights in 2023.

== Playing career ==
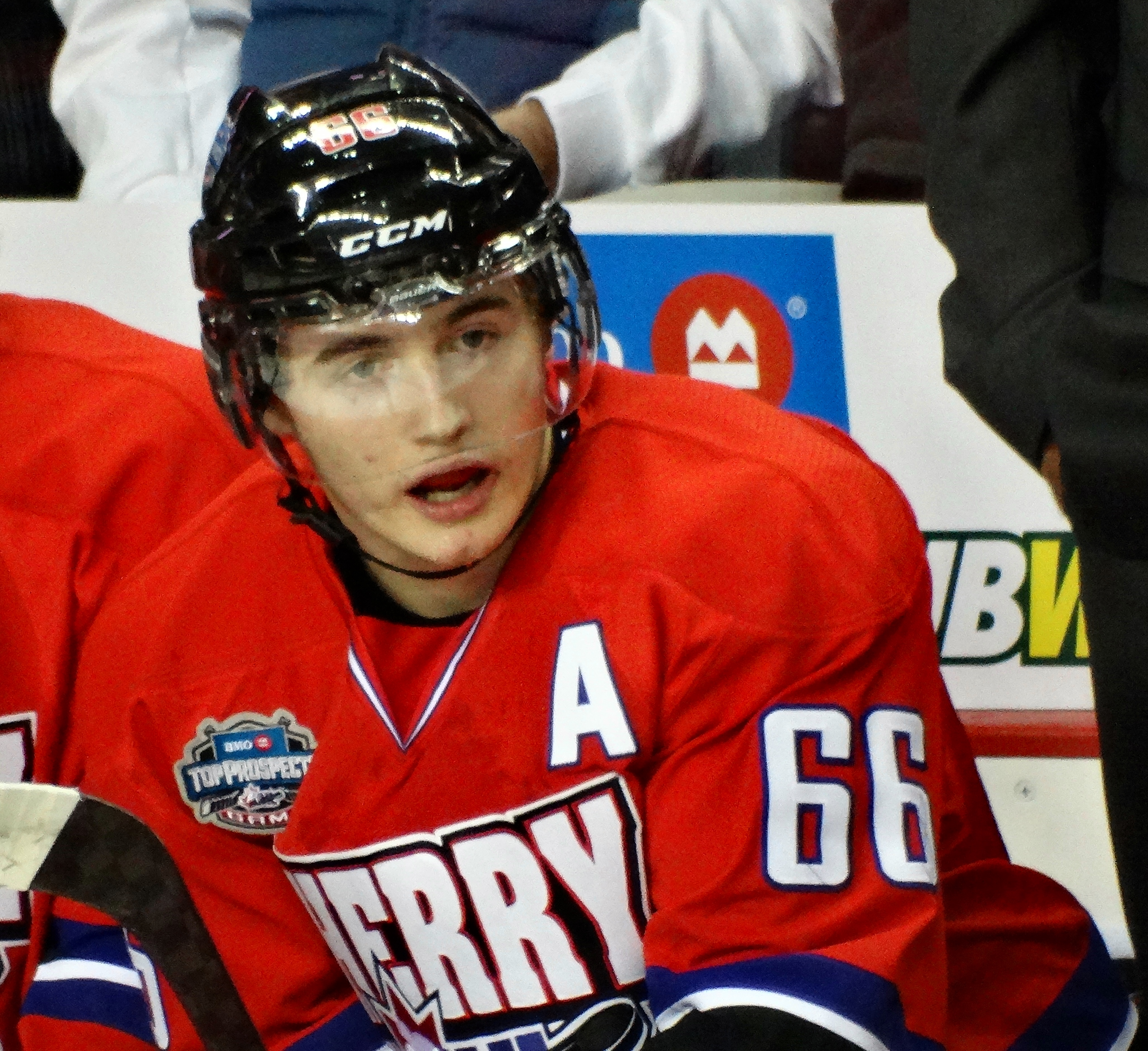
Barbashev during the 2014 CHL/NHL Top Prospects Game

=== Amateur ===
Barbashev played for HC MVD in the Russian Junior Hockey League (MHL) during the 2011–12 season. In 38 games with the club he recorded 8 goals and 10 points. At the conclusion of the season, Barbashev was selected first overall by the Moncton Wildcats in the 2012 Canadian Hockey League Import Draft.

Barbashev joined the Wildcats in 2012 where he scored 62 points in his first season, and was named to the QMJHL All-Rookie Team. Eligible for the 2014 NHL entry draft, Barbashev was the only "A"-rated prospect on the NHL Central Scouting Bureau's preliminary list of players to watch in the QMJHL. After his selection by the Blues in the second round, Barbashev was later signed to a three-year entry-level contract with the club on 21 July 2014.

=== Professional ===
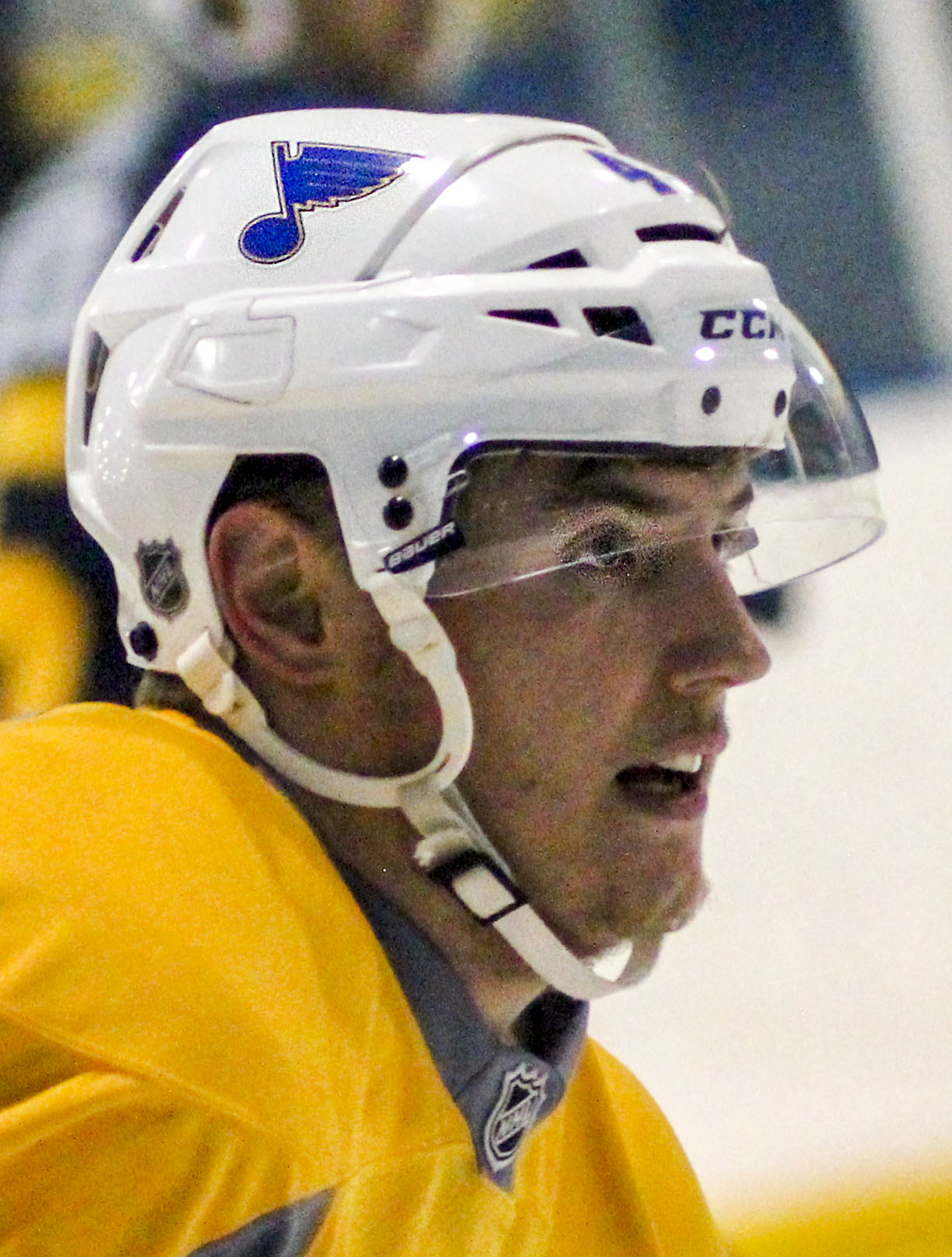
Barbashev practicing with the Blues in 2015

Barbashev made his professional debut in the 2015–16 season with the Blues' American Hockey League (AHL) affiliate, the Chicago Wolves. He recorded 28 points in 65 games.

Barbashev made his NHL debut on 25 January 2017 against the Minnesota Wild. At the time he was second on the Wolves in scoring with 37 points in 44 games. His first goal came against Andrew Hammond of the Ottawa Senators on 7 February. Barbashev finished the season playing 30 games for the Blues, where he had 12 points, and had 37 points in 46 games for the Wolves.

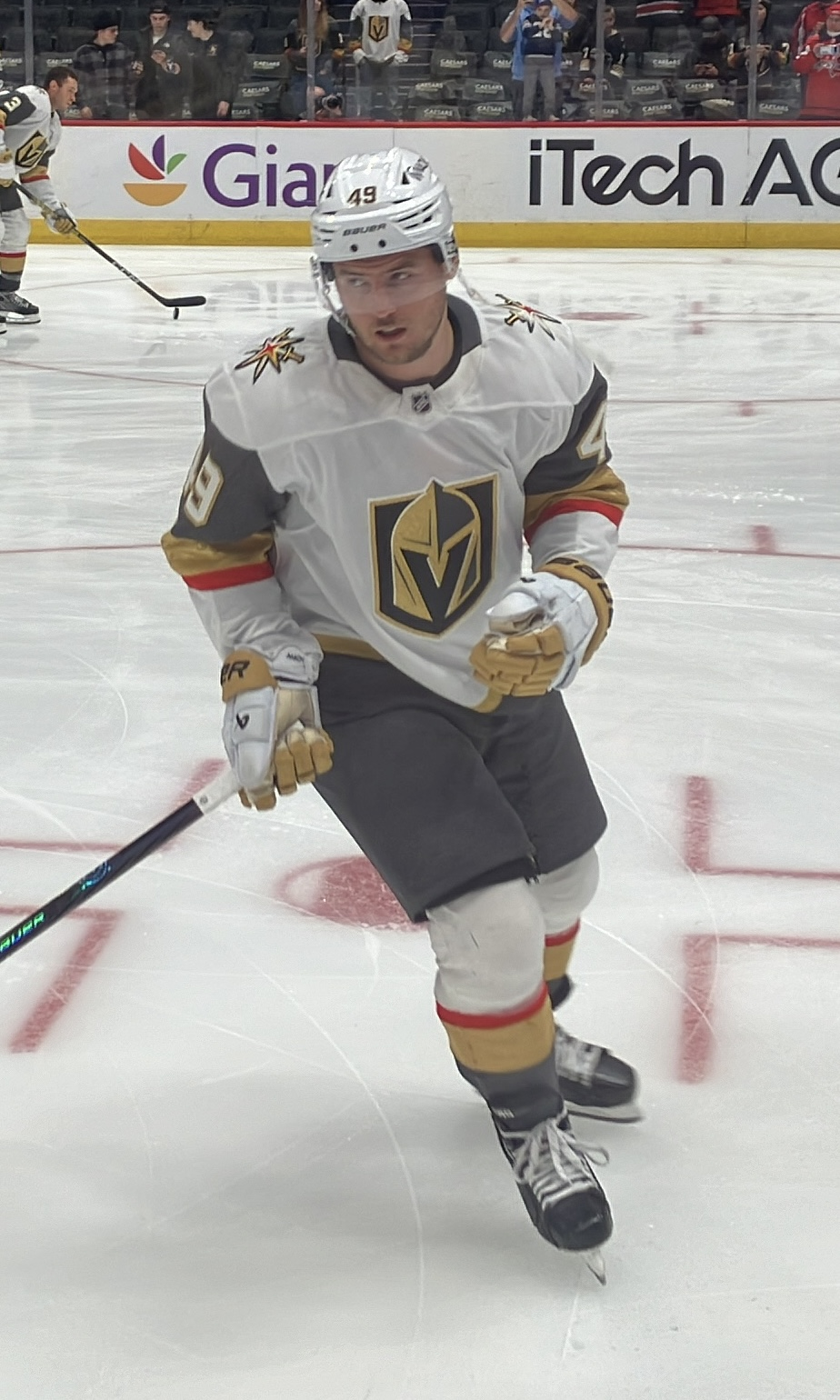
Barbashev with the Golden Knights in 2024.

Barbashev's first full season with the Blues came in 2018–19, where he recorded 26 points in 80 games. He and the Blues won the Stanley Cup, defeating the Boston Bruins in seven games. In 25 postseason games, he scored six points.

On 1 September 2019, the Blues re-signed Barbashev to a two-year, $2.95 million contract extension.

The 2022–23 season proved difficult for the Blues, who dropped out of contention for the postseason by the midpoint. Barbashev likewise did not match his record totals from the prior year, but posted 10 goals and 29 points in 59 games. With his contract set to expire, he was considered an in-demand player at the trade deadline. On 26 February 2023, he was traded to the Vegas Golden Knights in exchange for prospect Zach Dean.

Barbashev proved an immediate success on arriving in Vegas, with 6 goals and 10 assists in 23 regular season games. By the beginning of the 2023 Stanley Cup playoffs, he was playing on the team's top line alongside Jonathan Marchessault and Jack Eichel. He had 7 goals and 11 assists in Vegas' deep run to the 2023 Stanley Cup Final, where they defeated the Florida Panthers to take the championship, the team's first and Barbashev's second. Following their victory, there was some question as to whether Vegas would be able to retain Barbashev, given its constraints under the salary cap.

On 28 June 2023, Barbashev signed a five-year, $25 million extension with the Golden Knights. The team had earlier that day traded veteran forward Reilly Smith in order to create the necessary room for Barbashev's contract.

== International play ==
Competing internationally with the Russian national junior team, Barbashev won gold at the 2012 World U-17 Hockey Challenge, played at the 2012 Ivan Hlinka Memorial Tournament, placed fourth at the 2013 IIHF World U18 Championships, and won bronze at the 2014 World Junior Ice Hockey Championships. At the 2014 World Juniors, he was the youngest player on the Russian team, and had one goal and one assist.

== Personal life ==
Barbashev began skating at age three. Barbashev's older brother Sergei plays for Admiral Vladivostok of the Kontinental Hockey League (KHL). Barbashev and his wife married in July 2014. He also has a younger brother, Max, who played in the Dynamo Moscow youth system, and is currently playing with the New Mexico Goatheads of the ECHL.

== Career statistics ==
=== Regular season and playoffs ===
			Regular season					Playoffs
Season	Team	League	GP	G	A	Pts	PIM	GP	G	A	Pts	PIM
2011–12	HK MVD Balashikha	MHL	38	8	2	10	18	—	—	—	—	—
2012–13	Moncton Wildcats	QMJHL	68	18	44	62	36	5	1	2	3	0
2013–14	Moncton Wildcats	QMJHL	48	25	43	68	27	6	4	6	10	8
2014–15	Moncton Wildcats	QMJHL	57	45	50	95	59	16	13	11	24	14
2015–16	Chicago Wolves	AHL	65	10	18	28	15	—	—	—	—	—
2016–17	Chicago Wolves	AHL	46	19	18	37	14	2	0	0	0	0
2016–17	St. Louis Blues	NHL	30	5	7	12	2	6	0	0	0	2
2017–18	St. Louis Blues	NHL	53	7	6	13	4	—	—	—	—	—
2017–18	Chicago Wolves	AHL	20	5	5	10	6	—	—	—	—	—
2018–19	St. Louis Blues	NHL	80	14	12	26	17	25	3	3	6	4
2019–20	St. Louis Blues	NHL	69	11	15	26	23	3	0	0	0	2
2020–21	St. Louis Blues	NHL	38	5	7	12	6	4	0	1	1	4
2021–22	St. Louis Blues	NHL	81	26	34	60	40	12	0	2	2	4
2022–23	St. Louis Blues	NHL	59	10	19	29	36	—	—	—	—	—
2022–23	Vegas Golden Knights	NHL	23	6	10	16	6	22	7	11	18	18
2023–24	Vegas Golden Knights	NHL	82	19	26	45	42	7	0	4	4	0
2024–25	Vegas Golden Knights	NHL	70	23	28	51	10	11	1	1	2	6
2025–26	Vegas Golden Knights	NHL	82	23	38	61	14	22	6	8	14	8
NHL totals			667	149	202	351	200	112	17	30	47	48

=== International ===
Year	Team	Event	Result	GP	G	A	Pts	PIM
2012	Russia	U17	1st place, gold medalist(s)	5	4	2	6	4
2012	Russia	IH18	5th	4	1	0	1	4
2013	Russia	U18	4th	7	3	6	9	4
2014	Russia	WJC	3rd place, bronze medalist(s)	7	1	1	2	0
2015	Russia	WJC	2nd place, silver medalist(s)	7	3	3	6	2
Junior totals				30	12	12	24	14

== Awards and honors ==
Award	Year
QMJHL
All-Rookie Team	2013
NHL
Stanley Cup champion	2019, 2023
