= 2023 Stanley Cup Final =

2023 ice hockey championship series

| | 1 | 2 | 3 | 4 | 5 | Total |
|---|---|---|---|---|---|---|
| Florida Panthers | 2 | 2 | 3* | 2 | 3 | 1 |
| Vegas Golden Knights | 5 | 7 | 2* | 3 | 9 | 4 |
- * – Denotes overtime period(s)
- Location(s): Sunrise: FLA Live Arena (3, 4); Paradise: T-Mobile Arena (1, 2, 5)
- Coaches: Florida: Paul Maurice; Vegas: Bruce Cassidy
- Captains: Florida: Aleksander Barkov; Vegas: Mark Stone
- National anthems: Florida: Phillip Phillips (3); Cassadee Pope (4); Vegas: Carnell Johnson
- Referees: Steve Kozari (2, 4); Wes McCauley (1, 4); Dan O'Rourke (1, 3); Chris Rooney (2, 5); Kelly Sutherland (3, 5)
- Dates: June 3–13, 2023
- MVP: Jonathan Marchessault (Golden Knights)
- Series-winning goal: Reilly Smith (12:13, second)
- Networks: Canada: (English): CBC/Sportsnet (French): TVA Sports; United States: (English): TNT/TruTV, TBS (1–4)
- Announcers: (CBC/SN) Chris Cuthbert and Craig Simpson (TNT/TruTV/TBS) Kenny Albert, Eddie Olczyk, and Keith Jones (NHL International) E. J. Hradek and Kevin Weekes

The 2023 Stanley Cup Final was the championship series of the National Hockey League's (NHL) 2022–23 season and the culmination of the 2023 Stanley Cup playoffs. The Western Conference champion Vegas Golden Knights defeated the Eastern Conference champion Florida Panthers four games to one in the best-of-seven series to earn their first championship in their sixth season. Vegas had home ice advantage in the series with the better regular season record.

The series began on June 3, and concluded on June 13. This was the first Final series since 2018 in which neither team had previously won the Stanley Cup. For the first time since before the COVID-19 pandemic, the Final ran through the first weeks of June.

== Paths to the Final ==
=== Florida Panthers ===
This was the second Final appearance for the Panthers. Their only previous appearance was in 1996, which they lost in a four-game sweep to the Colorado Avalanche.

During the offseason, former Winnipeg Jets head coach Paul Maurice was hired as the Panthers head coach. The Panthers made a large offseason acquisition, trading Jonathan Huberdeau, who led the team in points the previous year, along with MacKenzie Weegar to the Calgary Flames for Matthew Tkachuk. Tkachuk led the team in points this year with 109. Through free agency, the team acquired forwards Nick Cousins, Colin White, and Eric Staal, defenceman Marc Staal (Eric's brother), and goaltender Alex Lyon. The team also opted to re-sign forward Eetu Luostarinen and goaltender Spencer Knight. Midway through the regular season, the team claimed defenceman Casey Fitzgerald off of waivers.

The Panthers finished with a 42–32–8 record and obtained the eighth seed in the Eastern Conference with 92 points, the lowest point total of any playoff team. In the first round, the Panthers overcame a 3–1 series deficit against the Presidents' Trophy-winning Boston Bruins, who had set the NHL season records for points and wins, and defeated them in a game seven overtime. They then eliminated the Toronto Maple Leafs in five games during the second round and swept the Carolina Hurricanes in the Eastern Conference final. The Panthers became the fourth eighth seed to reach the Final, following the Edmonton Oilers in 2006, the Los Angeles Kings in 2012, and the Nashville Predators in 2017.

=== Vegas Golden Knights ===
This was Vegas' second Final appearance. Their only previous appearance was in 2018, which they lost to the Washington Capitals in five games. The Golden Knights experienced immediate success after beginning play in 2017, reaching the Stanley Cup Final in their inaugural season and qualifying for the playoffs in their first four. However, they missed the playoffs for the first time in franchise history the previous season, which led to the firing of head coach Peter DeBoer.

During the offseason, the Golden Knights hired former Boston Bruins coach Bruce Cassidy as their head coach. They also acquired goaltender Adin Hill in a trade, re-signed Brett Howden, Reilly Smith, Keegan Kolesar, and Nicolas Roy, and also signed Phil Kessel, a two-time Stanley Cup champion during his time with the Pittsburgh Penguins, during free agency. At the trade deadline, the Golden Knights acquired forwards Ivan Barbashev (reuniting him with Alex Pietrangelo from the 2019 Stanley Cup champion St. Louis Blues) and Teddy Blueger, as well as goaltender Jonathan Quick who was flipped by the Columbus Blue Jackets from the Los Angeles Kings (reuniting him with defenceman Alec Martinez, both two-time Stanley Cup champions with the Kings).

The Golden Knights finished first in the Pacific Division and the Western Conference with 111 points via a 51–22–9 record. Vegas defeated the Winnipeg Jets in five games during the first round, triumphed over the Edmonton Oilers during the second round in six games, and knocked off the Dallas Stars in the Western Conference final in six games.

== Game summaries ==
Note: The numbers in parentheses represent each player's total goals or assists to that point of the entire playoffs.

=== Game one ===
| June 3 | Florida Panthers | 2–5 | Vegas Golden Knights | T-Mobile Arena | Recap |

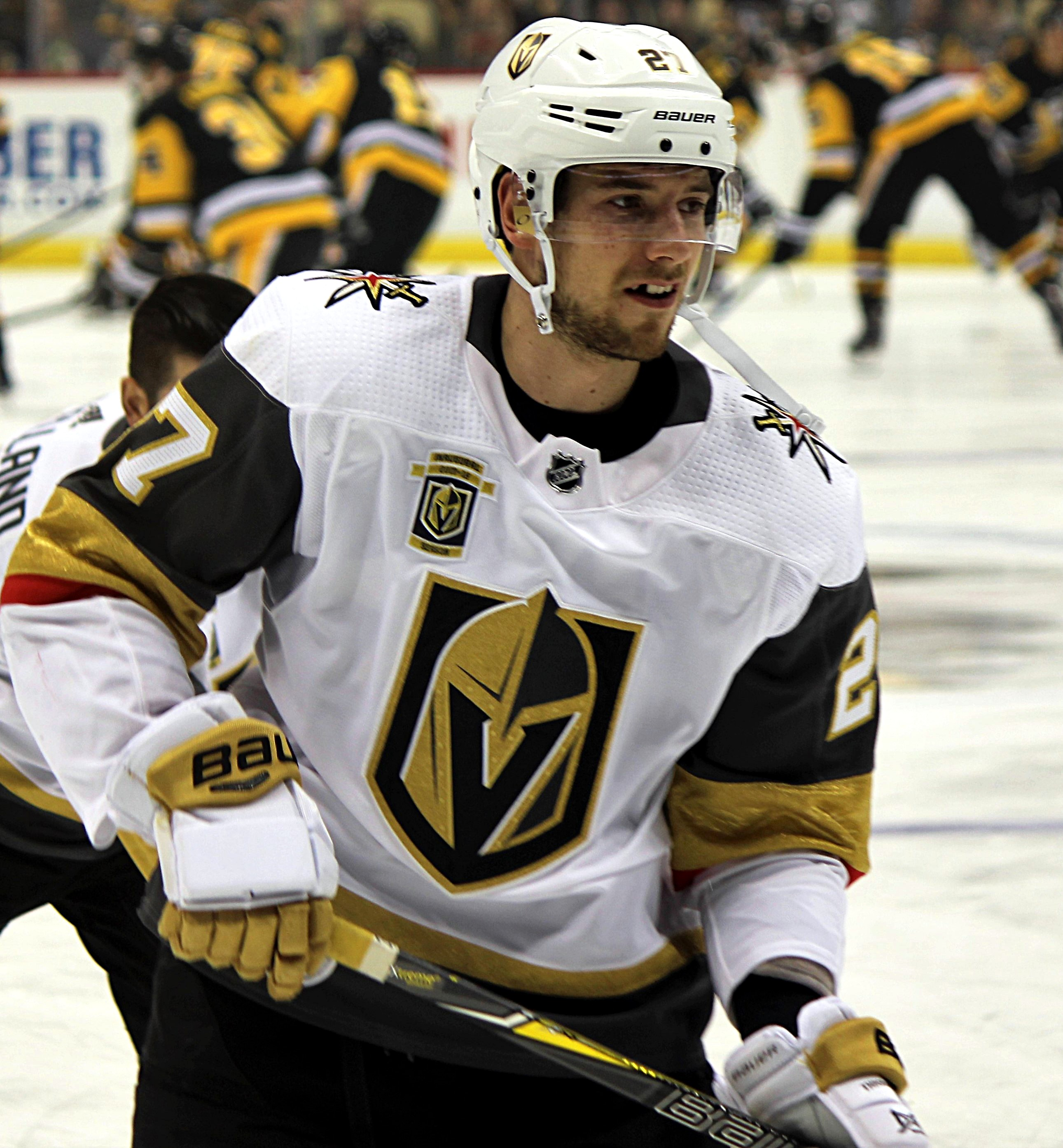
Shea Theodore scored a goal and two points in game one.

In game one, Florida began the scoring with a shorthanded goal by Eric Staal, scored on a wrap-around attempt. Vegas tied the game on a separate power play with Chandler Stephenson setting up Jonathan Marchessault's wrist shot beating Sergei Bobrovsky. In the second period, Shea Theodore's long range shot found its way past Bobrovsky, giving Vegas a 2–1 lead. With ten seconds remaining and a faceoff in the Golden Knights zone, the Panther's Anthony Duclair picked up a loose puck and fired a wrist shot past Hill to make it 2–2. In the third period, the Golden Knights led a rush into the Panther's zone with a shot by Ivan Barbashev deflecting back to Zach Whitecloud who scored for Vegas to make it 3–2. Later in the period, Matthew Tkachuk's clearing attempt was knocked down by Vegas captain Mark Stone, who shot it past Bobrovsky for a 4–2 lead. Florida challenged the play as Stone's stick could have been above his shoulders, which would have been a stoppage of play. Florida was unsuccessful in their challenge and assessed a minor penalty. With frustrations boiling over for Florida, both Matthew Tkachuk and Sam Bennett were called for misconducts for attempting to fight some of the Golden Knights. Reilly Smith then sealed Vegas' victory with an empty net goal to make it 5–2. The victory broke Florida's road-winning streak at eight games.

Game one
Scoring summary
| Period | Team | Goal | Assist(s) | Time | Score |
|---|---|---|---|---|---|
| 1st | FLA | Eric Staal (2) – sh | Anton Lundell (7) | 09:40 | 1–0 FLA |
| 1st | VGK | Jonathan Marchessault (10) – pp | Chandler Stephenson (7), Shea Theodore (8) | 17:18 | 1–1 |
| 2nd | VGK | Shea Theodore (1) | Brayden McNabb (3), Brett Howden (4) | 10:54 | 2–1 VGK |
| 2nd | FLA | Anthony Duclair (4) | Unassisted | 19:49 | 2–2 |
| 3rd | VGK | Zach Whitecloud (1) | Ivan Barbashev (10), Jack Eichel (13) | 06:59 | 3–2 VGK |
| 3rd | VGK | Mark Stone (1) | Unassisted | 13:41 | 4–2 VGK |
| 3rd | VGK | Reilly Smith (3) – pp – en | Jack Eichel (14) | 18:15 | 5–2 VGK |
Penalty summary
| Period | Team | Player | Penalty | Time | PIM |
| 1st | FLA | Nick Cousins | Roughing | 08:30 | 2:00 |
| 1st | VGK | William Carrier | Roughing | 11:42 | 2:00 |
| 1st | FLA | Josh Mahura | Interference | 16:27 | 2:00 |
| 2nd | FLA | Josh Mahura | Tripping | 03:28 | 2:00 |
| 2nd | VGK | Shea Theodore | Hooking | 14:40 | 2:00 |
| 3rd | VGK | Nicolas Roy | Hooking | 07:12 | 2:00 |
| 3rd | FLA | Eric Staal | Cross-checking | 10:04 | 2:00 |
| 3rd | FLA | Bench (served by Zac Dalpe) | Delay of game (unsuccessful coach's challenge) | 13:41 | 2:00 |
| 3rd | FLA | Matthew Tkachuk | Roughing – double minor | 15:36 | 4:00 |
| 3rd | VGK | Chandler Stephenson | Misconduct | 15:36 | 10:00 |
| 3rd | FLA | Sam Bennett | Misconduct | 15:36 | 10:00 |
| 3rd | FLA | Matthew Tkachuk | Misconduct | 15:36 | 10:00 |
| 3rd | VGK | Chandler Stephenson | Roughing | 15:36 | 2:00 |
| 3rd | FLA | Sam Bennett | Roughing | 15:36 | 2:00 |
| 3rd | FLA | Radko Gudas | Misconduct | 18:15 | 10:00 |

Shots by period
| Team | 1 | 2 | 3 | Total |
|---|---|---|---|---|
| FLA | 9 | 14 | 12 | 35 |
| VGK | 7 | 14 | 13 | 34 |

=== Game two ===
| June 5 | Florida Panthers | 2–7 | Vegas Golden Knights | T-Mobile Arena | Recap |

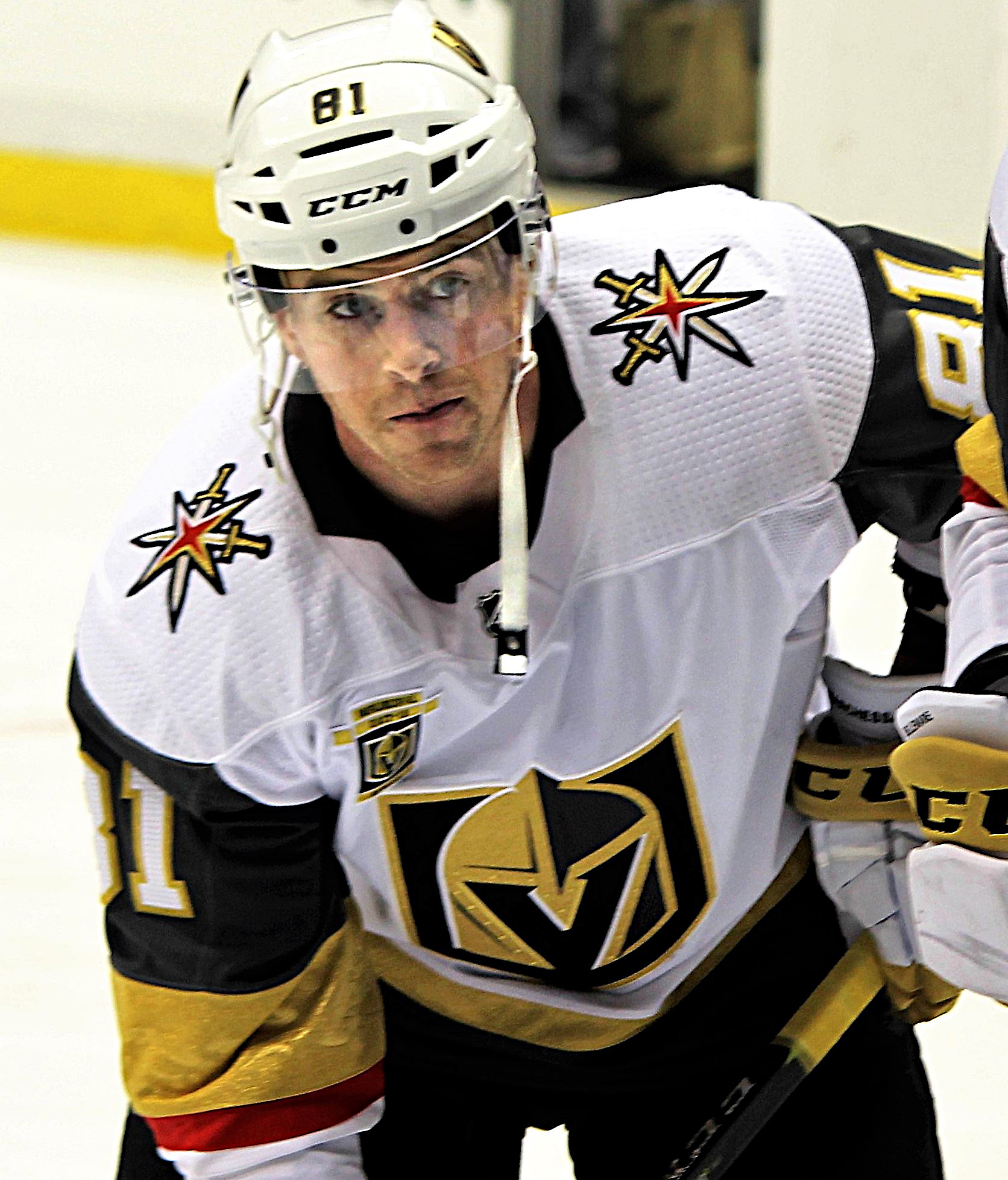
Jonathan Marchessault scored two goals, including one on the power play, and three points in game two.

In the first period of game two, the Golden Knights scored first on the power play as Jonathan Marchessault shot through a screen to beat the Florida goaltender over the shoulder. Later in the period, with Vegas in possession in the Florida zone, Alec Martinez shot past Josh Mahura's block attempt and the puck went to the top of the net for a 2–0 lead. During the second period, Nicolas Roy gave Vegas a 3–0 lead, shooting the puck under Sergei Bobrovsky's blocker. Brett Howden then forced Florida to swap Bobrovsky for backup Alex Lyon, scoring forehand-backhand on Vegas' thirteenth shot. Following a hit on Jack Eichel, Matthew Tkachuk and Ivan Barbashev both exchanged misconduct penalties for fighting after the whistle. In the third period, the Panthers ended Adin Hill's shutout bid as Anton Lundell scored just 14 seconds in. Vegas regained their four-goal lead as an all-alone Marchessault received a pass from Mark Stone and wristed a shot past Lyon. Michael Amadio then provided the sixth goal for Vegas, beating Lyon for a 6–1 lead. Tkachuk then brought the lead back down to four as his first goal of the series beat Hill. Later in the period, with Florida releasing their frustration, Vegas gained a power play. During the power play, Howden's second goal of the game ended any hopes of a Florida comeback, scoring to give Vegas a 7–2 lead, also the final score of the game.

Game two
Scoring summary
| Period | Team | Goal | Assist(s) | Time | Score |
|---|---|---|---|---|---|
| 1st | VGK | Jonathan Marchessault (11) – pp | Chandler Stephenson (8), Jack Eichel (15) | 07:05 | 1–0 VGK |
| 1st | VGK | Alec Martinez (1) | Ivan Barbashev (11) | 17:59 | 2–0 VGK |
| 2nd | VGK | Nicolas Roy (2) | William Carrier (3), Zach Whitecloud (5) | 02:59 | 3–0 VGK |
| 2nd | VGK | Brett Howden (4) | Mark Stone (10), Chandler Stephenson (9) | 07:10 | 4–0 VGK |
| 3rd | FLA | Anton Lundell (2) | Anthony Duclair (7) | 00:14 | 4–1 VGK |
| 3rd | VGK | Jonathan Marchessault (12) | Jack Eichel (16) | 02:10 | 5–1 VGK |
| 3rd | VGK | Michael Amadio (4) | William Karlsson (5) | 10:33 | 6–1 VGK |
| 3rd | FLA | Matthew Tkachuk (10) | Sam Bennett (8), Josh Mahura (3) | 12:44 | 6–2 VGK |
| 3rd | VGK | Brett Howden (5) – pp | Michael Amadio (5), William Carrier (4) | 17:52 | 7–2 VGK |
Penalty summary
| Period | Team | Player | Penalty | Time | PIM |
| 1st | FLA | Ryan Lomberg | Cross-checking | 06:39 | 2:00 |
| 1st | FLA | Brandon Montour | Roughing | 13:53 | 2:00 |
| 1st | VGK | Nicolas Roy | Hooking | 15:38 | 2:00 |
| 2nd | VGK | Ivan Barbashev | Roughing | 07:59 | 2:00 |
| 2nd | FLA | Colin White | Slashing | 07:59 | 2:00 |
| 2nd | VGK | Alex Pietrangelo | Interference | 10:01 | 2:00 |
| 2nd | VGK | William Carrier | Roughing | 12:35 | 2:00 |
| 2nd | FLA | Matthew Tkachuk | Roughing | 17:56 | 2:00 |
| 2nd | VGK | Ivan Barbashev | Roughing | 17:56 | 2:00 |
| 2nd | VGK | Ivan Barbashev | Misconduct | 17:56 | 10:00 |
| 2nd | FLA | Matthew Tkachuk | Misconduct | 17:56 | 10:00 |
| 2nd | VGK | Alex Pietrangelo | Roughing | 17:56 | 2:00 |
| 2nd | FLA | Gustav Forsling | Roughing | 17:56 | 2:00 |
| 3rd | FLA | Carter Verhaeghe | Cross-checking | 03:01 | 2:00 |
| 3rd | FLA | Matthew Tkachuk | Misconduct | 14:01 | 10:00 |
| 3rd | FLA | Casey Fitzgerald | Misconduct | 16:14 | 10:00 |
| 3rd | VGK | Keegan Kolesar | Misconduct | 16:14 | 10:00 |
| 3rd | FLA | Anthony Duclair (served by Carter Verhaeghe) | Cross-checking | 16:28 | 2:00 |
| 3rd | FLA | Anthony Duclair | Abuse of officials – misconduct | 16:28 | 10:00 |
| 3rd | FLA | Eric Staal | Misconduct | 16:28 | 10:00 |
| 3rd | FLA | Nick Cousins | Misconduct | 18:41 | 10:00 |
| 3rd | VGK | Zach Whitecloud | Misconduct | 18:41 | 10:00 |
| 3rd | VGK | Reilly Smith (served by Jonathan Marchessault) | Cross-checking | 19:52 | 2:00 |
| 3rd | FLA | Sam Reinhart | Misconduct | 19:52 | 10:00 |
| 3rd | VGK | Reilly Smith | Misconduct | 19:52 | 10:00 |
| 3rd | VGK | Brett Howden | Misconduct | 19:52 | 10:00 |

Shots by period
| Team | 1 | 2 | 3 | Total |
|---|---|---|---|---|
| FLA | 10 | 13 | 8 | 31 |
| VGK | 11 | 7 | 10 | 28 |

=== Game three ===
| June 8 | Vegas Golden Knights | 2–3 | OT | Florida Panthers | FLA Live Arena | Recap |

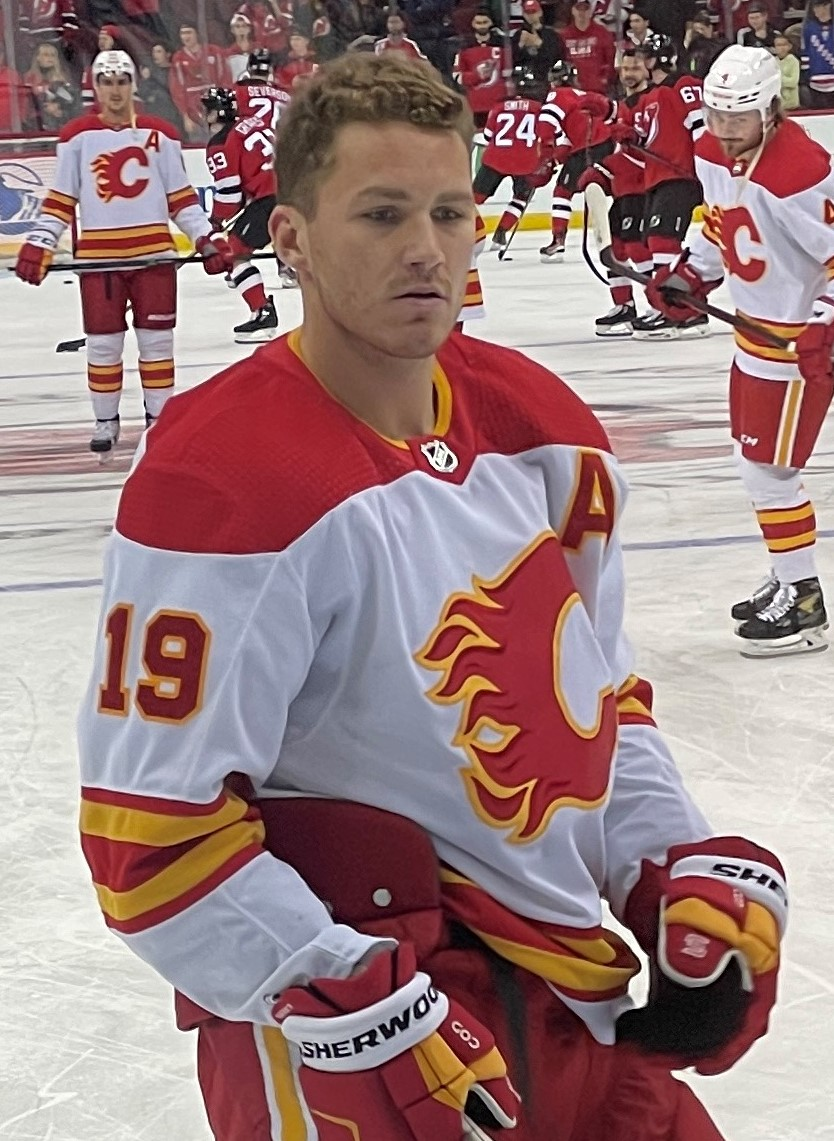
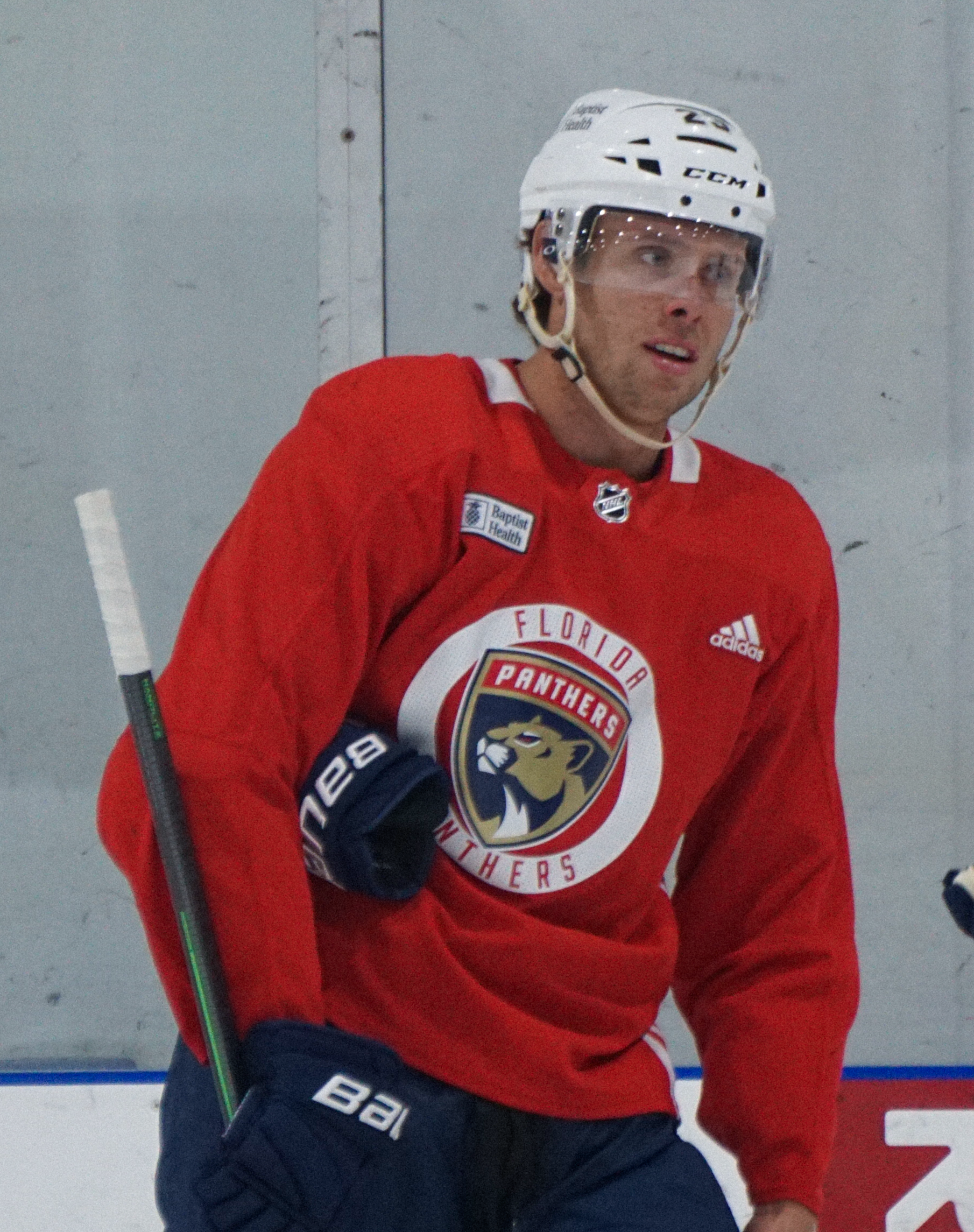
Matthew Tkachuk (left), shown with Calgary, scored the game-tying goal, while Carter Verhaeghe (right) scored the overtime winner in game three.

Back in Florida for game three, Brandon Montour began the scoring for the Panthers in the first period as his shot from the left circle beat Adin Hill. Vegas was able to tie the game during a 4-on-3 power play when Jonathan Marchessault's shot got tipped in by Mark Stone. In the second period, Vegas gained another power play, during which Jack Eichel passed across to Marchessault who shot past Sergei Bobrovsky into the top-left corner for a 2–1 Golden Knights lead. In the third period, with the Florida goaltender pulled for an extra attacker, Matthew Tkachuk scored on a rebound from Carter Verhaeghe to tie the game 2–2. With the game in overtime, Verhaeghe fired a wrist shot past Hill giving Florida a 3–2 victory and their first win in the Stanley Cup Final in franchise history.

Game three
Scoring summary
| Period | Team | Goal | Assist(s) | Time | Score |
|---|---|---|---|---|---|
| 1st | FLA | Brandon Montour (7) | Matthew Tkachuk (13), Eric Staal (3) | 04:08 | 1–0 FLA |
| 1st | VGK | Mark Stone (8) – pp | Jonathan Marchessault (10), Shea Theodore (9) | 16:03 | 1–1 |
| 2nd | VGK | Jonathan Marchessault (13) – pp | Jack Eichel (17), Mark Stone (11) | 14:59 | 2–1 VGK |
| 3rd | FLA | Matthew Tkachuk (11) | Carter Verhaeghe (10), Aaron Ekblad (6) | 17:47 | 2–2 |
| OT | FLA | Carter Verhaeghe (7) | Sam Bennett (9), Gustav Forsling (5) | 04:27 | 3–2 FLA |
Penalty summary
| Period | Team | Player | Penalty | Time | PIM |
| 1st | VGK | William Carrier | High-sticking | 06:01 | 2:00 |
| 1st | FLA | Marc Staal | Tripping | 12:14 | 2:00 |
| 1st | FLA | Radko Gudas | Cross-checking | 15:17 | 2:00 |
| 1st | VGK | William Carrier | Boarding | 15:17 | 2:00 |
| 1st | FLA | Anthony Duclair | Tripping | 15:40 | 2:00 |
| 2nd | VGK | William Carrier | Tripping | 00:24 | 2:00 |
| 2nd | FLA | Aaron Ekblad | Holding | 04:56 | 2:00 |
| 2nd | VGK | Brayden McNabb | Hooking | 08:00 | 2:00 |
| 2nd | FLA | Aleksander Barkov | Interference | 14:13 | 2:00 |
| 2nd | VGK | Alec Martinez | Interference | 16:26 | 2:00 |
| 2nd | FLA | Anton Lundell | Slashing | 19:22 | 2:00 |
| 3rd | VGK | Jack Eichel | Hooking | 03:01 | 2:00 |
| 3rd | VGK | Ivan Barbashev | Roughing | 10:37 | 2:00 |
| 3rd | FLA | Radko Gudas | Roughing | 10:37 | 2:00 |
| 3rd | FLA | Gustav Forsling | Tripping | 19:48 | 2:00 |
| OT | None | | | | |

Shots by period
| Team | 1 | 2 | 3 | OT | Total |
|---|---|---|---|---|---|
| VGK | 6 | 13 | 6 | 2 | 27 |
| FLA | 5 | 8 | 9 | 1 | 23 |

=== Game four ===
| June 10 | Vegas Golden Knights | 3–2 | Florida Panthers | FLA Live Arena | Recap |

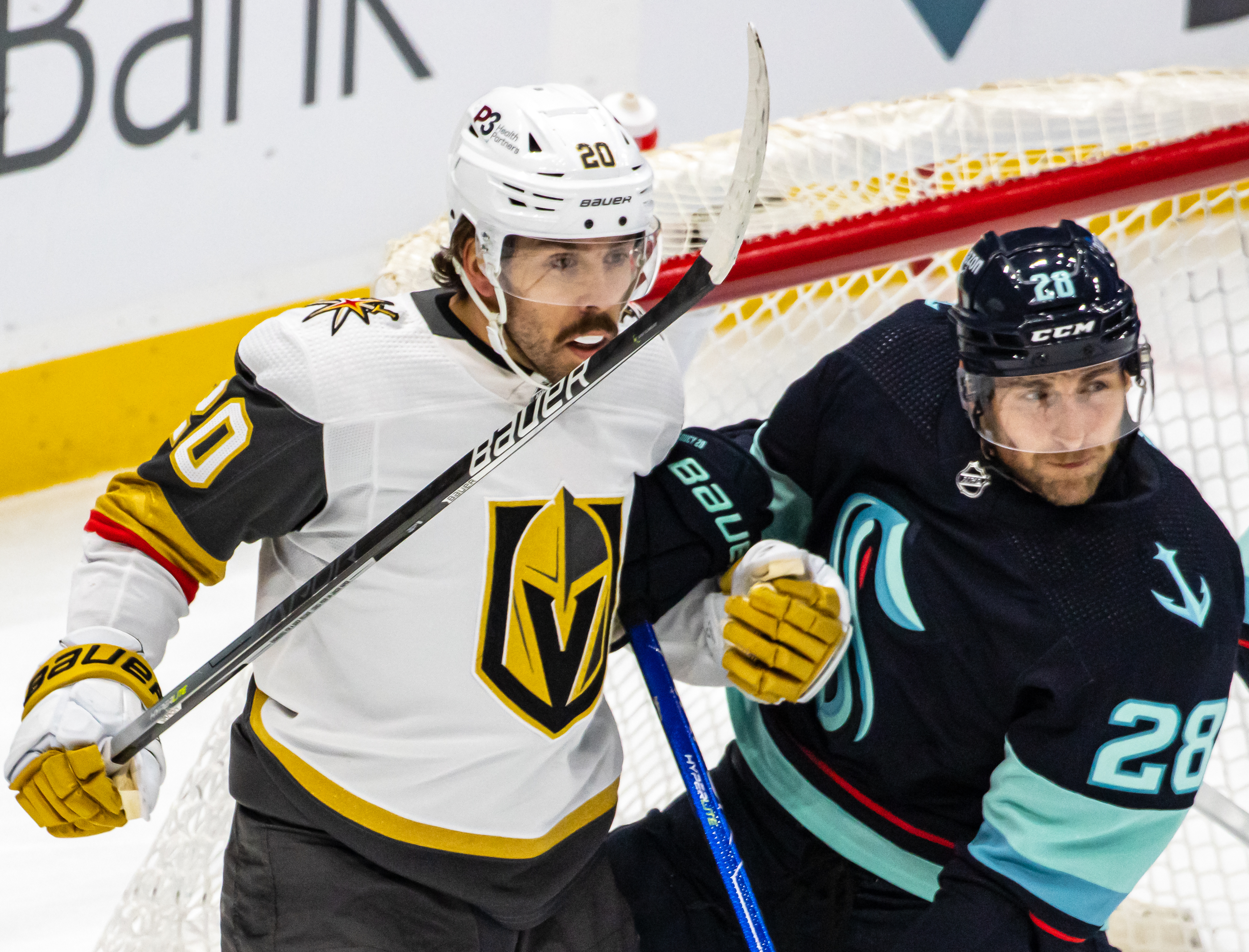
Chandler Stephenson (left) scored two goals in game four.

In game four, Vegas began the scoring 1:39 into the first period as Zach Whitecloud made a cross-ice pass to Chandler Stephenson, who maneuvered through all Florida defenders and shot the puck past Sergei Bobrovsky. Stephenson continued his scoring into the second period as a pass by Mark Stone found its way to the forward whose one-timer beat Bobrovsky for a 2–0 Vegas lead. Following soon after, William Karlsson picked up Nicolas Hague's rebound shot and gave the Golden Knights a 3–0 lead. With less than four minutes remaining in the period, Florida defenceman Brandon Montour shot the puck at the net and it deflected off Brayden McNabb and Shea Theodore past Adin Hill to cut Vegas' lead to two goals. Florida then cut their deficit to one goal as the Panthers rushed into the Vegas zone, Montour backhanded a pass to captain Aleksander Barkov whose fired past Hill from the right circle. Vegas maintained their 3–2 lead, including fending off a power play with 17.4 seconds left, as Hill stopped 29 of 31 shots to give the Golden Knights a 3–1 series lead.

Game four
Scoring summary
| Period | Team | Goal | Assist(s) | Time | Score |
|---|---|---|---|---|---|
| 1st | VGK | Chandler Stephenson (9) | Zach Whitecloud (6), Mark Stone (12) | 01:39 | 1–0 VGK |
| 2nd | VGK | Chandler Stephenson (10) | Mark Stone (13), Nicolas Hague (3) | 07:28 | 2–0 VGK |
| 2nd | VGK | William Karlsson (11) | Nicolas Hague (4), Jonathan Marchessault (11) | 11:04 | 3–0 VGK |
| 2nd | FLA | Brandon Montour (8) | Aleksander Barkov (11), Anton Lundell (8) | 16:09 | 3–1 VGK |
| 3rd | FLA | Aleksander Barkov (5) | Brandon Montour (4), Anton Lundell (8) | 03:50 | 3–2 VGK |
Penalty summary
| Period | Team | Player | Penalty | Time | PIM |
| 1st | None | | | | |
| 2nd | FLA | Marc Staal | Tripping | 02:52 | 2:00 |
| 3rd | VGK | Alex Pietrangelo | Delay of game (puck over glass) | 19:42 | 2:00 |
| 3rd | FLA | Matthew Tkachuk | Slashing | 20:00 | 2:00 |
| 3rd | FLA | Matthew Tkachuk | Unsportsmanlike conduct | 20:00 | 2:00 |
| 3rd | FLA | Matthew Tkachuk | Misconduct | 20:00 | 10:00 |
| 3rd | VGK | Adin Hill | Unsportsmanlike conduct | 20:00 | 2:00 |
| 3rd | FLA | Brandon Montour | Charging | 20:00 | 2:00 |
| 3rd | FLA | Brandon Montour | Misconduct | 20:00 | 10:00 |

Shots by period
| Team | 1 | 2 | 3 | Total |
|---|---|---|---|---|
| VGK | 12 | 11 | 8 | 31 |
| FLA | 12 | 7 | 12 | 31 |

=== Game five ===
| June 13 | Florida Panthers | 3–9 | Vegas Golden Knights | T-Mobile Arena | Recap |

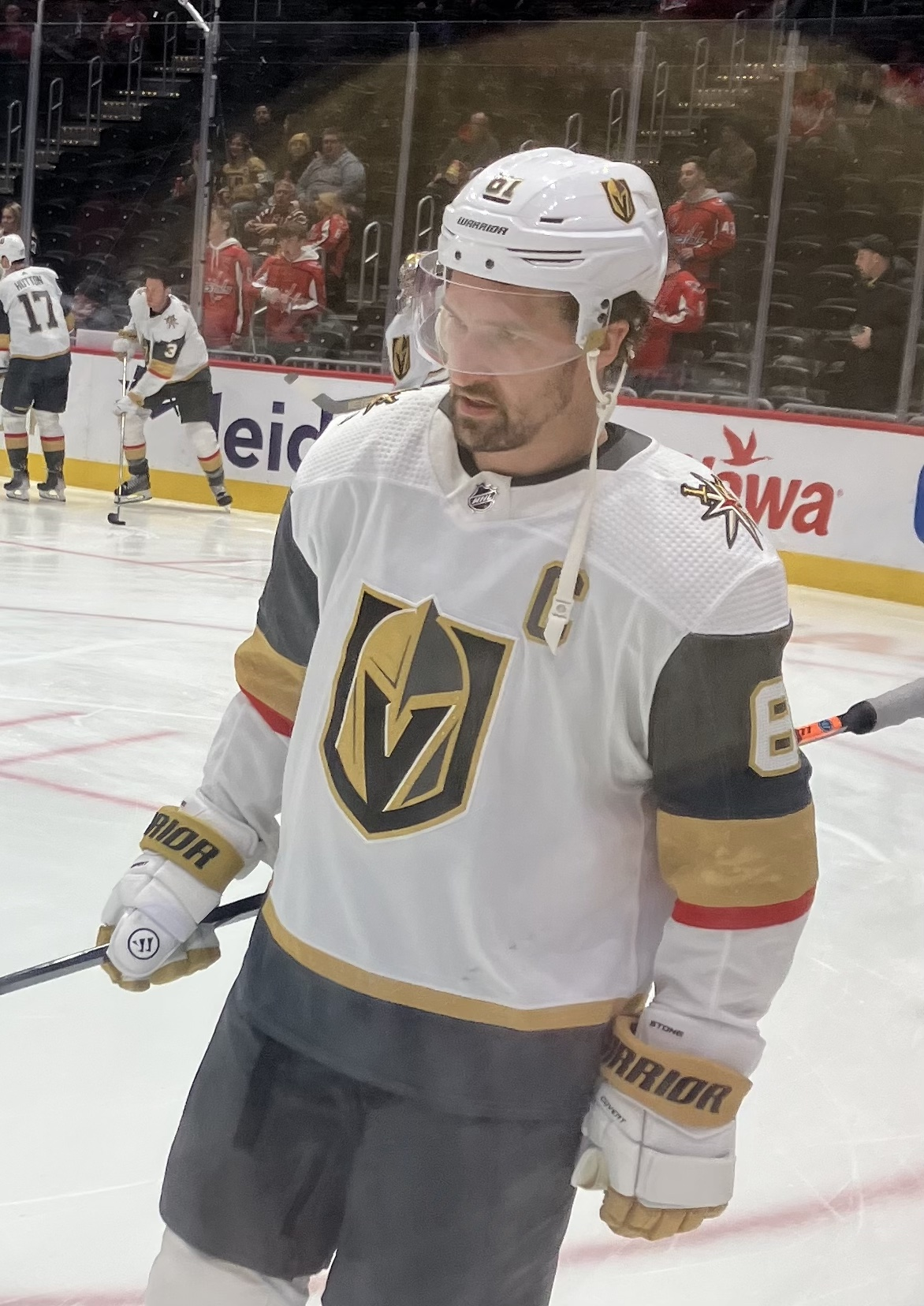
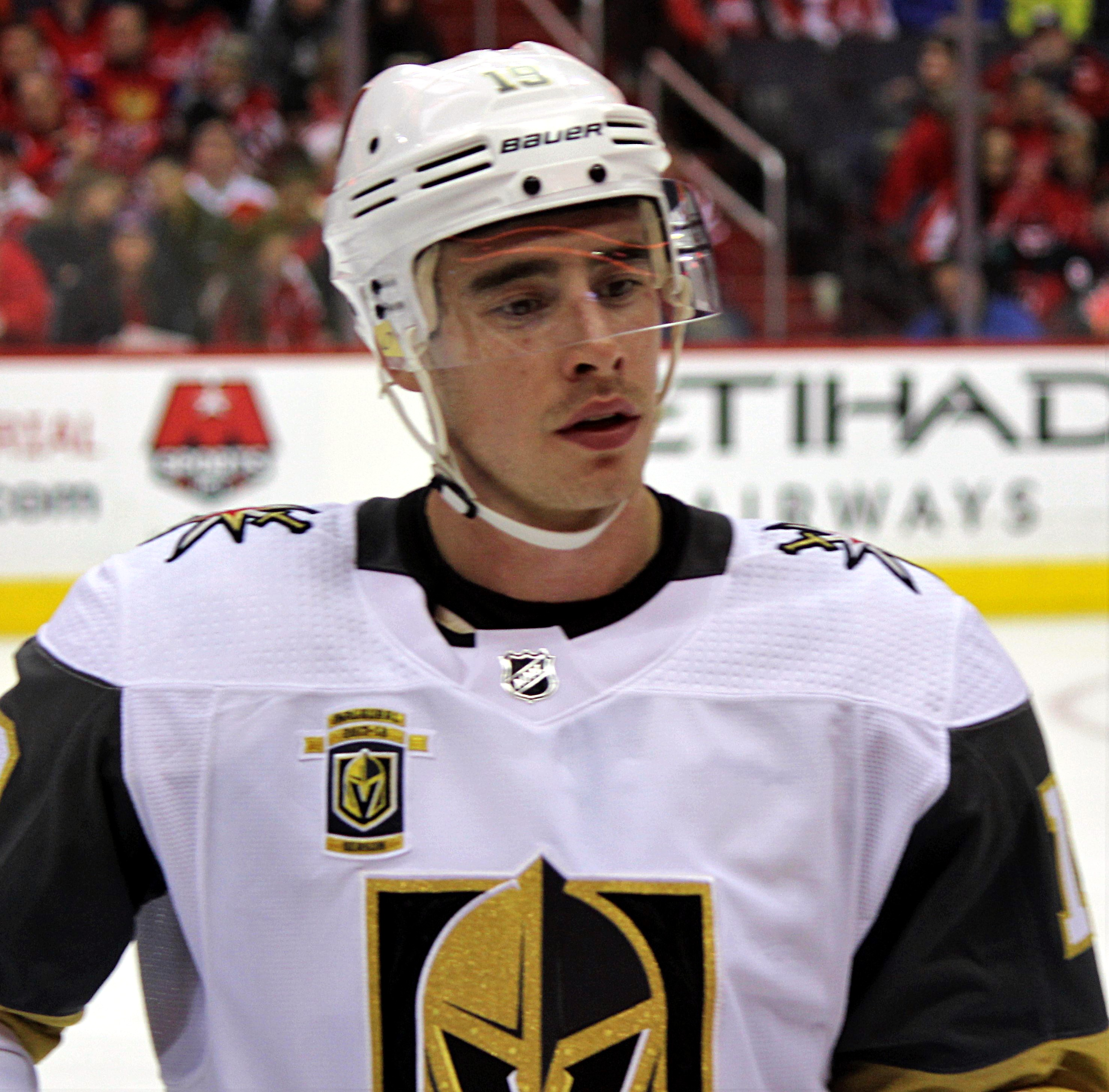
Mark Stone (left) scored a hat trick, while Reilly Smith (right) scored the Stanley Cup-clinching goal in game five.

In game five, the Golden Knights began the scoring on a shorthanded rush as Mark Stone outwaited Sergei Bobrovsky to beat him on the glove side. The Golden Knights doubled their lead as Jack Eichel's shot bumped over Bobrovsky's shoulder and got covered, but was quickly poked away. With the free puck, Nicolas Hague scored for Vegas. The Panthers made it 2–1 early in the second period as Nick Cousins forced a turnover in the Vegas defensive zone and passed it to defenceman Aaron Ekblad whose long range shot made its way into the net. The Golden Knights recovered their two-goal lead as a stretch pass by Alex Pietrangelo made its way to Eichel who then dropped a pass to Alec Martinez and he shot it past Bobrovsky. Reilly Smith soon gave the Golden Knights a 4–1 lead as he fired in a between-the-legs pass from William Karlsson. Stone's second goal made it 5–1 as a Chandler Stephenson-led rush led to a cross-ice pass from Brett Howden, which Stone then shot between Bobrovsky's pads for his second goal of the game. Michael Amadio extended the Golden Knights lead to 6–1 with two seconds remaining; after pushing the puck towards the Panthers goaltender and being pushed himself into the net by a Panther defenceman, the puck found its way under Bobrovsky and in. In the third period, Vegas made the game a rout, with Ivan Barbashev scoring Vegas' seventh goal of the game. Florida brought their deficit down to five when a quick shot by Sam Reinhart hit the top corner past Adin Hill. Sam Bennett then dropped Florida's deficit to four goals as his long range shot was deflected into the net. With approximately six minutes remaining in the game, Florida head coach Paul Maurice opted to go for an empty net. However, Stone scored on the empty net to complete his hat trick, making it 8–3. His hat trick, the 40th to occur in the Stanley Cup Final, was the first since 1996, which was also against the Panthers, and the first to occur in a Cup-winning game since 1922. Nicolas Roy potted Vegas' ninth goal of the evening with 1:02 remaining to seal the Golden Knights victory and their first Stanley Cup. Vegas' nine goals set a new record for goals scored in a Cup-clinching game, surpassing the 8–0 score by which the Pittsburgh Penguins clinched the title in 1991, and tied the record for most goals by a team in a Final's game, previously set by the Detroit Red Wings in 1936 and later matched by the Toronto Maple Leafs in 1942.

Jonathan Marchessault was awarded the Conn Smythe Trophy as most valuable player of the playoffs, becoming the first undrafted player to win the award since Wayne Gretzky in 1988. Vegas became the second fastest team to win the Stanley Cup as an expansion franchise, following the Edmonton Oilers in 1984. Marchessault, William Carrier, William Karlsson, Brayden McNabb, Reilly Smith, and Shea Theodore were the only players from the Golden Knights' expansion draft, inaugural season, and 2018 Stanley Cup Final campaign to remain with the team up until the Stanley Cup victory; this group of players earned the collective monikers "Golden Misfits" and "Original Misfits". The win gave the state of Nevada and the Las Vegas metropolitan area its first ever major (North American "Big Four") men's professional sports championship, (Note: The Las Vegas Aces of the WNBA won their first championship the previous year.) and the first ever championship for a North American Big Four men's professional sports team founded in the 21st century. (Note: Including the Seattle Kraken (NHL), Houston Texans (NFL), and New Orleans Pelicans (NBA).)

Chandler Stephenson, who previously defeated Vegas for the Cup in 2018 as a member of the Washington Capitals, became the third player of the expansion era to win a Cup with a team he previously defeated for it, joining Scott Niedermayer (with New Jersey in 2003 and Anaheim in 2007) and Billy Carroll (with the New York Islanders in 1983 and Edmonton in 1985).

Meanwhile, the Panthers were one of two South Florida teams to lose major championships within two days, as the Miami Heat also lost the 2023 NBA Finals to the Denver Nuggets one day prior.

Game five
Scoring summary
| Period | Team | Goal | Assist(s) | Time | Score |
|---|---|---|---|---|---|
| 1st | VGK | Mark Stone (9) – sh | Unassisted | 11:52 | 1–0 VGK |
| 1st | VGK | Nicolas Hague (2) | Jack Eichel (18), Jonathan Marchessault (12) | 13:41 | 2–0 VGK |
| 2nd | FLA | Aaron Ekblad (2) | Nick Cousins (5) | 02:15 | 2–1 VGK |
| 2nd | VGK | Alec Martinez (2) | Jack Eichel (19), Alex Pietrangelo (9) | 10:28 | 3–1 VGK |
| 2nd | VGK | Reilly Smith (4) | William Karlsson (6), Shea Theodore (10) | 12:13 | 4–1 VGK |
| 2nd | VGK | Mark Stone (10) | Brett Howden (5), Chandler Stephenson (10) | 17:15 | 5–1 VGK |
| 2nd | VGK | Michael Amadio (5) | Reilly Smith (10) | 19:58 | 6–1 VGK |
| 3rd | VGK | Ivan Barbashev (7) | Jack Eichel (20), Shea Theodore (11) | 08:22 | 7–1 VGK |
| 3rd | FLA | Sam Reinhart (8) | Sam Bennett (10), Brandon Montour (5) | 08:47 | 7–2 VGK |
| 3rd | FLA | Sam Bennett (5) | Gustav Forsling (6), Sam Reinhart (5) | 11:39 | 7–3 VGK |
| 3rd | VGK | Mark Stone (11) – en | Unassisted | 14:06 | 8–3 VGK |
| 3rd | VGK | Nicolas Roy (3) | Shea Theodore (12), Brayden McNabb (4) | 18:58 | 9–3 VGK |
Penalty summary
| Period | Team | Player | Penalty | Time | PIM |
| 1st | FLA | Aaron Ekblad | Interference | 07:53 | 2:00 |
| 1st | VGK | Keegan Kolesar | Interference | 10:38 | 2:00 |
| 2nd | None | | | | |
| 3rd | None | | | | |

Shots by period
| Team | 1 | 2 | 3 | Total |
|---|---|---|---|---|
| FLA | 8 | 6 | 21 | 35 |
| VGK | 11 | 14 | 7 | 32 |

== Team rosters ==
Years indicated in boldface under the "Final appearance" column signify that the player won the Stanley Cup in the given year.

=== Florida Panthers ===
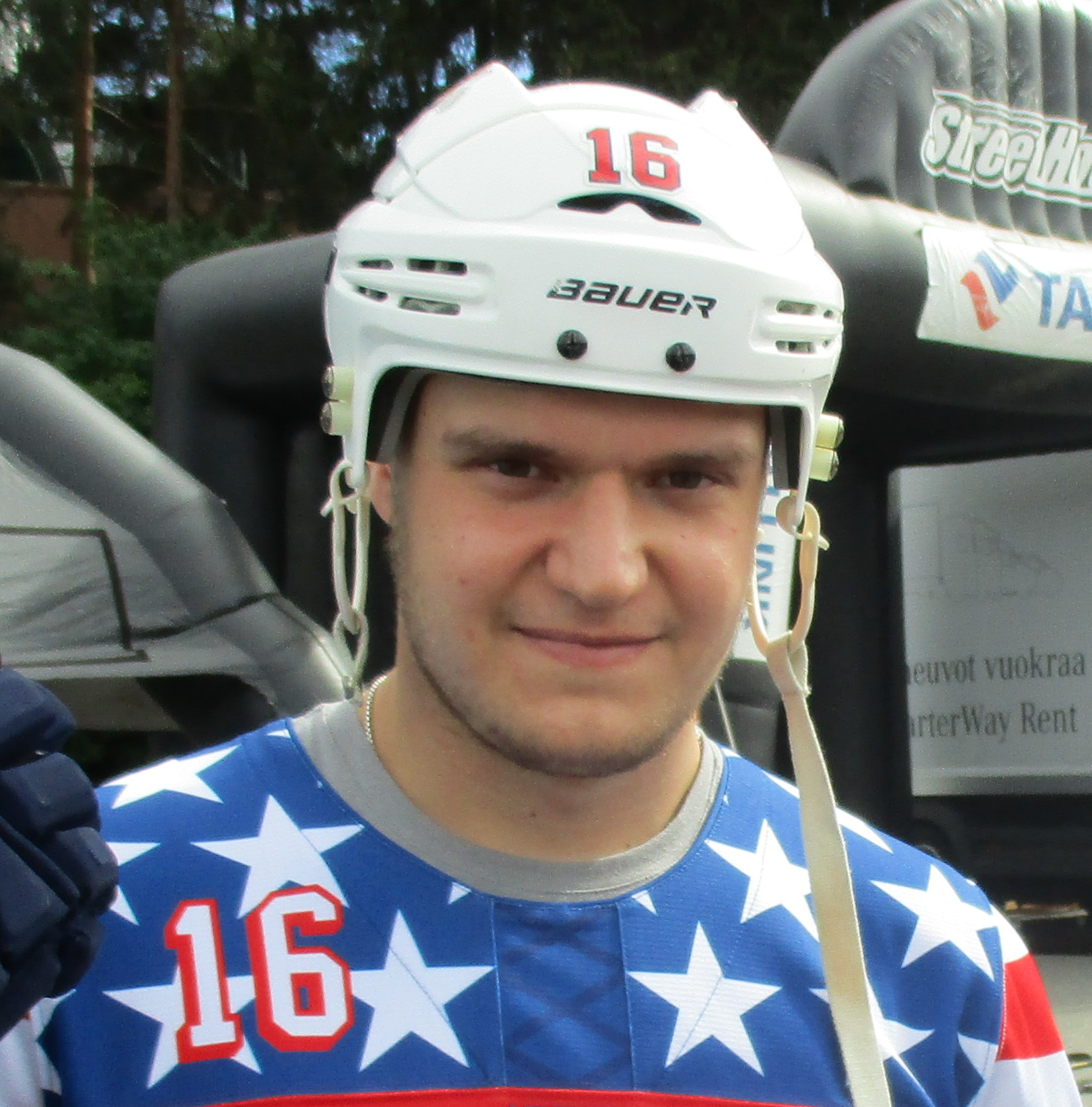
Aleksander Barkov captained the Panthers to their second Final appearance in franchise history.

| # | Nat | Player | Position | Hand | Age | Acquired | Place of birth | Final appearance |
|---|---|---|---|---|---|---|---|---|
| 16 | (Finland) | Aleksander Barkov – **C** | C | L | 27 | 2013 | Tampere, Finland | first |
| 9 | (Canada) | Sam Bennett | C/W | L | 26 | 2021 | East Gwillimbury, Ontario | first |
| 72 | (Russia) | Sergei Bobrovsky | G | L | 34 | 2019 | Novokuznetsk, Soviet Union | first |
| 21 | (Canada) | Nick Cousins | C | L | 29 | 2022 | Belleville, Ontario | first |
| 22 | (Canada) | Zac Dalpe | C | R | 33 | 2021 | Paris, Ontario | first |
| 14 | (Russia) | Grigori Denisenko | RW | R | 22 | 2018 | Novosibirsk, Russia | first |
| 10 | (Canada) | Anthony Duclair | LW | L | 27 | 2020 | Pointe-Claire, Quebec | first |
| 5 | (Canada) | Aaron Ekblad – **A** | D | R | 27 | 2014 | Windsor, Ontario | first |
| 4 | (United States) | Casey Fitzgerald | D | R | 26 | 2023 | Boca Raton, Florida | first |
| 42 | (Sweden) | Gustav Forsling | D | L | 26 | 2021 | Linköping, Sweden | first |
| 7 | (Czech Republic) | Radko Gudas | D | R | 32 | 2020 | Kladno, Czechoslovakia | first |
| 94 | (Canada) | Ryan Lomberg | W | L | 28 | 2020 | Richmond Hill, Ontario | first |
| 15 | (Finland) | Anton Lundell | C | L | 21 | 2020 | Espoo, Finland | first |
| 27 | (Finland) | Eetu Luostarinen | C | L | 24 | 2020 | Siilinjärvi, Finland | first |
| 34 | (United States) | Alex Lyon | G | L | 30 | 2022 | Baudette, Minnesota | first |
| 28 | (Canada) | Josh Mahura | D | L | 25 | 2022 | St. Albert, Alberta | first |
| 62 | (Canada) | Brandon Montour | D | R | 29 | 2021 | Ohsweken, Ontario | first |
| 13 | (Canada) | Sam Reinhart | C | R | 27 | 2021 | North Vancouver, British Columbia | first |
| 54 | (Canada) | Givani Smith | RW | L | 25 | 2022 | Toronto, Ontario | first |
| 12 | (Canada) | Eric Staal | C | L | 38 | 2022 | Thunder Bay, Ontario | third (**2006**, 2021) |
| 18 | (Canada) | Marc Staal | D | L | 36 | 2022 | Thunder Bay, Ontario | second (2014) |
| 19 | (United States) | Matthew Tkachuk – **A** | LW | L | 25 | 2022 | Scottsdale, Arizona | first |
| 23 | (Canada) | Carter Verhaeghe | C | L | 27 | 2020 | Waterdown, Ontario | second (**2020**) |
| 6 | (United States) | Colin White | C | R | 26 | 2022 | Hanover, Massachusetts | first |

=== Vegas Golden Knights ===
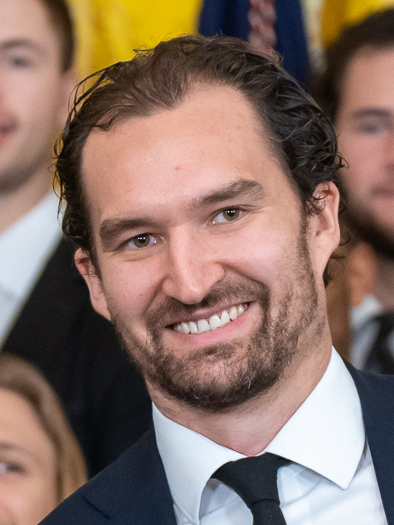
Mark Stone captained the Golden Knights to their second Final appearance in franchise history.

| # | Nat | Player | Position | Hand | Age | Acquired | Place of birth | Final appearance |
|---|---|---|---|---|---|---|---|---|
| 22 | (Canada) | Michael Amadio | RW/C | R | 27 | 2021 | Sault Ste. Marie, Ontario | first |
| 49 | (Russia) | Ivan Barbashev | C | L | 27 | 2023 | Moscow, Russia | second (**2019**) |
| 53 | (Latvia) | Teddy Blueger | C | L | 28 | 2023 | Riga, Latvia | first |
| 39 | (Canada) | Laurent Brossoit | G | L | 30 | 2021 | Port Alberni, British Columbia | first (did not dress) |
| 28 | (Canada) | William Carrier | LW | L | 28 | 2017 | LaSalle, Quebec | second (2018) |
| 43 | (United States) | Paul Cotter | C/LW | L | 23 | 2018 | Canton, Michigan | first (did not play) |
| 9 | (United States) | Jack Eichel | C | R | 26 | 2021 | North Chelmsford, Massachusetts | first |
| 14 | (Canada) | Nicolas Hague | D | L | 24 | 2017 | Kitchener, Ontario | first |
| 33 | (Canada) | Adin Hill | G | L | 27 | 2022 | Comox, British Columbia | first |
| 21 | (Canada) | Brett Howden | C | L | 25 | 2021 | Oakbank, Manitoba | first |
| 17 | (Canada) | Ben Hutton | D | L | 30 | 2021 | Brockville, Ontario | first |
| 71 | (Sweden) | William Karlsson | C | L | 30 | 2017 | Märsta, Sweden | second (2018) |
| 8 | (United States) | Phil Kessel | RW | R | 35 | 2022 | Madison, Wisconsin | third (**2016**, **2017**) |
| 55 | (Canada) | Keegan Kolesar | RW | R | 26 | 2017 | Brandon, Manitoba | first |
| 81 | (Canada) | Jonathan Marchessault | RW | R | 32 | 2017 | Cap-Rouge, Quebec | third (2015, 2018) |
| 23 | (United States) | Alec Martinez | D | L | 35 | 2020 | Rochester Hills, Michigan | third (**2012**, **2014**) |
| 3 | (Canada) | Brayden McNabb | D | L | 32 | 2017 | Davidson, Saskatchewan | second (2018) |
| 94 | (Canada) | Brayden Pachal | D | R | 23 | 2019 | Estevan, Saskatchewan | first |
| 7 | (Canada) | Alex Pietrangelo – **A** | D | R | 33 | 2020 | King City, Ontario | second (**2019**) |
| 32 | (United States) | Jonathan Quick | G | L | 37 | 2023 | Milford, Connecticut | third (**2012**, **2014**) |
| 10 | (Canada) | Nicolas Roy | C/RW | R | 26 | 2019 | Amos, Quebec | first |
| 19 | (Canada) | Reilly Smith – **A** | RW | L | 32 | 2017 | Etobicoke, Ontario | second (2018) |
| 20 | (Canada) | Chandler Stephenson | C | L | 29 | 2019 | Saskatoon, Saskatchewan | second (**2018**) |
| 61 | (Canada) | Mark Stone – **C** | RW | R | 31 | 2019 | Winnipeg, Manitoba | first |
| 27 | (Canada) | Shea Theodore | D | L | 27 | 2017 | Langley, British Columbia | second (2018) |
| 36 | (Canada) | Logan Thompson | G | R | 26 | 2020 | Calgary, Alberta | first (did not dress) |
| 2 | (Canada) | Zach Whitecloud | D | R | 26 | 2018 | Brandon, Manitoba | first |

== Stanley Cup engraving ==
The Stanley Cup was presented to Golden Knights captain Mark Stone by NHL commissioner Gary Bettman following the Golden Knights' 9–3 win in game five.

The following Golden Knights players and staff had their names engraved on the Stanley Cup:

2022–23 Vegas Golden Knights

=== Players ===
Centres

- 9 Jack Eichel
- 10 Nicolas Roy*
- 20 Chandler Stephenson
- 21 Brett Howden*
- 43 Paul Cotter* †
- 49 Ivan Barbashev*
- 53 Teddy Blueger ‡
- 71 William Karlsson

Wingers

- 8 Phil Kessel †
- 19 Reilly Smith
- 22 Michael Amadio*
- 28 William Carrier
- 55 Keegan Kolesar
- 61 Mark Stone (Captain)
- 81 Jonathan Marchessault

Defencemen

- 2 Zach Whitecloud
- 3 Brayden McNabb
- 7 Alex Pietrangelo
- 14 Nicolas Hague
- 17 Ben Hutton ‡
- 23 Alec Martinez
- 27 Shea Theodore
- 94 Brayden Pachal ‡

Goaltenders

- 32 Jonathan Quick
- 33 Adin Hill
- 36 Logan Thompson †
- 39 Laurent Brossoit ‡
- * Played both centre and wing.
- † Did not play or dress in Final.
- ‡ Exemption granted to engrave the name of a player who did not automatically qualify. (Note: Automatic qualification for a player's name to be engraved on the Stanley Cup: Playing in (for a goaltender, dressing for) at least one Stanley Cup Final game or at least half of regular season games for the Stanley Cup-winning team.)

=== Coaching and administrative staff ===
- Bill Foley (Owner/Chairman), Robert Foley (Chief Business Officer), George McPhee (President of Hockey Operations), Kelly McCrimmon (general manager)
- Bruce Cassidy (Head Coach), John Stevens (Asst. Coach), Ryan Craig (Asst. Coach), Sean Burke (Director of Goaltending/NHL Goaltending Coach)
- Misha Donskov (Asst. Coach), Dave Rogowski (Video Coach), Kyle Moore (Associate Head Athletic Trainer), Mike Muir (Assistant Athletic Trainer)
- Raul Dorantes (Manual Therapist), Doug Davidson (Strength and Conditioning Coach), Aaron Heishman (Head of Sport Science and Reconditioning)
- Chris Davidson-Adams (Head Equipment Manager), J.W. Aiken (Assistant Equipment Manager), Rick Braunstein (Director of Team Services)
- Katy Headman Boettinger (Director of Hockey Administration), Vaughn Karpan (Director of Player Personnel), Bob Lowes (Assistant Director of Player Personnel)
- Scott Luce (Director of Amateur Scouting), Andrew Lugerner (Director of Hockey Legal Affairs), Wil Nichol (Director of Player Development), Tom Poraszka (Director of Hockey Operations)

=== Engraving notes ===
- #8 Phil Kessel (RW) played all 82 regular-season games and four playoff games, all in the first round.
- #43 Paul Cotter (LW) played 55 regular-season games and no playoff games.
- #36 Logan Thompson (G) played 37 regular-season games and dressed for an additional 18, before missing the remainder of the regular season and playoffs due to injury.
- Vegas successfully requested an exemption to engrave the names of four players who did not automatically qualify.
  - #53 Teddy Blueger (C) played in 63 regular-season games (45 with the Pittsburgh Penguins and 18 with the Golden Knights), plus six playoff games (two in the second round, four in the Western Conference Final).
  - #17 Ben Hutton (D) played in 31 regular-season games and two playoff games (one each in the first and second rounds).
  - #39 Laurent Brossoit (G) played in 11 regular-season games and eight playoff games (five in the first round, three in the second round) before missing the remainder of the playoffs due to injury.
  - #94 Brayden Pachal (D) played in ten regular-season games and one playoff game in the first round.
- #90 Robin Lehner (G) and #41 Nolan Patrick (C) missed the entire season due to injury, and were left off the engraving.
- With Adin Hill and Jonathan Quick automatically qualifying for engraving due to dressing in the Stanley Cup Finals, Logan Thompson automatically qualifying due to dressing in enough regular season games, and Laurent Brossoit qualifiyng via a successful exemption, Vegas became the first team in NHL history to have four goaltenders engraved on the Cup; the previous high of three goaltenders was most recently reached by the 2016 Pittsburgh Penguins (with Matt Murray, Marc-André Fleury, and Jeff Zatkoff).

=== Player notes ===
- Fourteen players who were on the roster during the Final were left off the Stanley Cup engraving due to not qualifying. All were healthy scratches for the entire playoffs. They received championship rings.
  - #16 Pavel Dorofeyev (LW) – 18 regular season games
  - #65 Dysin Mayo (D) – 0 regular season games with Vegas, 15 regular season games with Arizona
  - #46 Jonas Rondbjerg (RW) – 13 regular season games
  - #6 Kaedan Korczak (D) – 10 regular season games
  - #51 Byron Froese (C) – 9 regular season games
  - #30 Jiri Patera (G) – 2 regular season games
  - #56 Sheldon Rempal (RW) – 1 regular season game
  - #40 Lukas Cormier (D) – 0 regular season games, 62 with Henderson of the American Hockey League (AHL)
  - #24 Brendan Brisson (C) – 0 regular season games, 58 with Henderson of the AHL
  - #11 Ivan Morozov (C) – 0 regular season games, 58 with Henderson of the AHL
  - #5 Daniil Chayka (D) – 0 regular season games, 57 with Henderson of the AHL
  - #31 Isaiah Saville (G) – 0 regular season games, 10 with Henderson of the AHL

== Media rights ==
For the first time since 2019, before the COVID-19 pandemic began, both the Cup Final and the NBA Finals roughly coincided during the first weeks of June. As with prior years since at least 2016 when both leagues hold their respective championship series at roughly the same time, games of the Cup Final are scheduled on different days than those of the 2023 NBA Finals, typically on the day prior to or after the other league's games.

In Canada, this was the ninth consecutive Stanley Cup Final broadcast by Sportsnet and CBC Television in English, and TVA Sports in French. The series was also streamed on Sportsnet Now.

In the United States, the series was televised by TNT under the second year of a seven-year deal in which the network gets the Final in odd years and ABC gets the Final in even years. This marked the first time that the Stanley Cup Final did not air in part on U.S. broadcast television since 1994. As is common for other major events broadcast by Warner Bros. Discovery Sports (such as the NCAA men's basketball national championship), all games were aired in simulcast across multiple Turner Broadcasting channels, including TBS (except for games held on Tuesdays and Wednesdays due to MLB on TBS Tuesday Night and AEW Dynamite respectively) and TruTV.

== Notes ==
| Preceded by Colorado Avalanche; 2022 | Vegas Golden Knights; Stanley Cup champions 2023 | Succeeded by Florida Panthers; 2024 |
