= Alec Martinez =

American ice hockey player (born 1987)

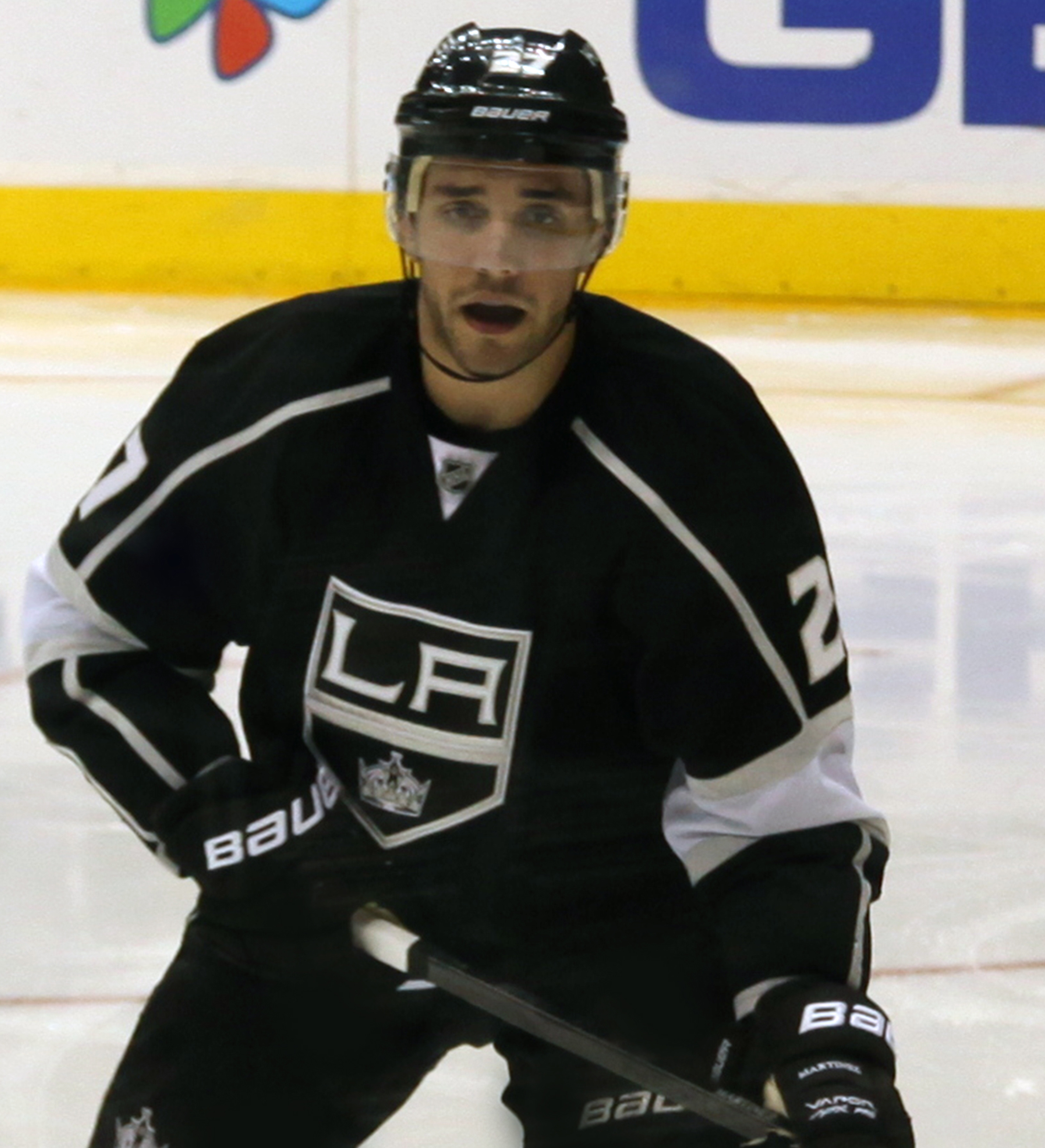
- Martinez with the Los Angeles Kings in December 2013
- Born: July 26, 1987 (age 39) Rochester Hills, Michigan, U.S.
- Height: 6 ft 1 in (185 cm)
- Weight: 215 lb (98 kg; 15 st 5 lb)
- Position: Defense
- Shot: Left
- Played for: Los Angeles Kings; TPS; Vegas Golden Knights; Chicago Blackhawks
- National team: United States
- NHL draft: 95th overall, 2007; Los Angeles Kings
- Playing career: 2008–2025

Alec Martinez (born July 26, 1987) is an American professional ice hockey broadcaster and former player who played as a defenseman in the National Hockey League (NHL). He is a three-time Stanley Cup champion, having won with the Los Angeles Kings in 2012 and 2014 and with the Vegas Golden Knights in 2023. In 2014, he scored both the Western Conference Final-winning goal and the Stanley Cup Final-winning goal, both in overtime.

== Early life ==
Martinez was born in the Detroit suburb of Rochester Hills, Michigan. His paternal grandfather is Spanish and his paternal grandmother is Canadian. He grew up in Michigan before moving to Tualatin, Oregon and later Fremont, California where he played junior hockey for the Santa Clara Blackhawks and San Jose Jr. Sharks. He earned four varsity letters at Stoney Creek High School in Rochester Hills.

He played college hockey while attending Miami University in Oxford, Ohio.

== Playing career ==
=== Los Angeles Kings ===
Martinez was drafted 95th overall by the Los Angeles Kings in the 2007 NHL entry draft while playing for Miami University. He made his professional debut for the Kings' American Hockey League (AHL) minor league affiliate, the Manchester Monarchs, in 2008. A year later, he was announced to the opening roster for the 2009–10 season with Kings, in which he played four games and had no goals and no assists on six shots on goal.

He was sent back down to the Manchester Monarchs for the first 20 games of the 2010–11 season. On November 23, 2010, he was recalled by the Los Angeles Kings to replace the struggling Jake Muzzin. On November 24, Martinez scored his first NHL goal, on the power play, in 4–1 loss to the Montreal Canadiens at the Bell Centre against goaltender Carey Price. Martinez had his first multi-point game December 4, 2010, including a goal against Chris Osgood of the Detroit Red Wings in a 3–2 victory for the Kings. After joining the squad for the 2010–11 season, Martinez earned trust from former Kings Head Coach Terry Murray for solid offensive and defensive play, and that continued after Darryl Sutter replaced Murray in December 2011.

On July 8, 2011, Martinez signed a two-year, $1,475,000 contract with the Kings. On June 11, 2012, the team won the Stanley Cup.

With the 2012–13 NHL season being threatened by a lockout that ultimately wiped out half the season, on December 31, 2012, Martinez signed with the Allen Americans of the Central Hockey League. He played with them until the end of the lockout.

Martinez was injured for 10 of the Kings' first 15 games of the 2013–14 season, but wound up returning as a regular on the Kings' defense, even contributing to the team's offense.

He scored two series winners en route to the Kings' second Stanley Cup title – on June 1, 2014, Martinez scored 5:47 into overtime of game seven of the Western Conference Finals against the Chicago Blackhawks on goaltender Corey Crawford; 12 days later, in game five of the 2014 Stanley Cup Final against the New York Rangers, a shot by Tyler Toffoli, which rebounded off goaltender Henrik Lundqvist in double overtime, led to another Martinez goal. The goal was scored with 5:17 left in double overtime as he became the 17th player to score the Cup-winning goal in overtime. He became the first to do it since Patrick Kane in 2010 and the first to do it at home since Bob Nystrom in 1980.

On December 4, 2014, Martinez signed a six-year $24 million extension with the Kings.

Playing a full 82 games for the only time in his NHL career (and one of only four defensemen on the team’s roster), Martinez recorded a career high 39 points in the 2016–17 season, his best season post-Stanley Cup Final.

=== Vegas Golden Knights ===
On February 19, 2020, Martinez was traded to the Vegas Golden Knights in exchange for a second-round pick in the 2020 and St. Louis' second-round pick in the 2021 NHL entry draft. Martinez had a successful debut with the Golden Knights, scoring a goal and an assist in a 5–3 win over the Tampa Bay Lightning.

On July 28, 2021, Martinez signed a three-year, $15.75 million contract with the Golden Knights.

On November 11, 2021, Martinez was cut in the face by Brandon Duhaime's skate in a match against the Minnesota Wild. He would be placed on long term injured reserve as a result. He was activated off the IR on March 26, 2022.

During the 2023 Stanley Cup Final against the Florida Panthers, Martinez scored two goals, after going scoreless most of the playoffs, to secure his third Stanley Cup championship. After hoisting the Cup himself, he handed it to former Kings teammate Jonathan Quick, who had joined the Golden Knights earlier in the year. Reflecting on his third victory, Martinez said "this one is a little different being on the other side of the age spectrum."

=== Chicago Blackhawks ===
Leaving the Golden Knights as a free agent, Martinez signed a one-year, $4 million contract with the Chicago Blackhawks on July 1, 2024.

On April 13, 2025, shortly before the Blackhawks' last home game of the season, Martinez announced that he would be retiring from the NHL, forgoing the Blackhawks' two remaining road games. Martinez, alongside fellow retiree Patrick Maroon, received a video tribute and standing ovation during the game, as well as a handshake line from the visiting Winnipeg Jets.

== International play ==
Medal record

Men's ice hockey

Representing the United States

World Championships
| Bronze medal – third place | 2018 Denmark | |

Martinez represented the United States at the 2018 IIHF World Championship where he recorded one goal and two assists in ten games and won a bronze medal.

== Career statistics ==
=== Regular season and playoffs ===
| | | | Regular season | | | | | Playoffs |
| Season | Team | League | GP | G | A | Pts | PIM | GP | G | A | Pts | PIM |
|---|---|---|---|---|---|---|---|---|---|---|---|---|
| 2003–04 | Honeybaked U18 AAA | MWEHL | 59 | 7 | 14 | 21 | 28 | — | — | — | — | — |
| 2004–05 | Cedar Rapids RoughRiders | USHL | 58 | 10 | 11 | 21 | 30 | 11 | 1 | 2 | 3 | 8 |
| 2005–06 | Miami RedHawks | CCHA | 39 | 3 | 8 | 11 | 31 | — | — | — | — | — |
| 2006–07 | Miami RedHawks | CCHA | 42 | 9 | 15 | 24 | 40 | — | — | — | — | — |
| 2007–08 | Miami RedHawks | CCHA | 42 | 9 | 23 | 32 | 42 | — | — | — | — | — |
| 2008–09 | Manchester Monarchs | AHL | 72 | 8 | 15 | 23 | 42 | — | — | — | — | — |
| 2009–10 | Los Angeles Kings | NHL | 4 | 0 | 0 | 0 | 2 | — | — | — | — | — |
| 2009–10 | Manchester Monarchs | AHL | 55 | 7 | 23 | 30 | 26 | 16 | 0 | 3 | 3 | 10 |
| 2010–11 | Manchester Monarchs | AHL | 20 | 5 | 11 | 16 | 14 | — | — | — | — | — |
| 2010–11 | Los Angeles Kings | NHL | 60 | 5 | 11 | 16 | 18 | 6 | 0 | 1 | 1 | 2 |
| 2011–12 | Los Angeles Kings | NHL | 51 | 6 | 6 | 12 | 8 | 20 | 1 | 2 | 3 | 8 |
| 2012–13 | TPS | SM-l | 11 | 1 | 1 | 2 | 8 | — | — | — | — | — |
| 2012–13 | Allen Americans | CHL | 3 | 1 | 1 | 2 | 0 | — | — | — | — | — |
| 2012–13 | Los Angeles Kings | NHL | 27 | 1 | 4 | 5 | 10 | 7 | 0 | 2 | 2 | 8 |
| 2013–14 | Los Angeles Kings | NHL | 61 | 11 | 11 | 22 | 14 | 26 | 5 | 5 | 10 | 12 |
| 2014–15 | Los Angeles Kings | NHL | 56 | 6 | 16 | 22 | 10 | — | — | — | — | — |
| 2015–16 | Los Angeles Kings | NHL | 78 | 10 | 21 | 31 | 40 | 1 | 0 | 0 | 0 | 0 |
| 2016–17 | Los Angeles Kings | NHL | 82 | 9 | 30 | 39 | 24 | — | — | — | — | — |
| 2017–18 | Los Angeles Kings | NHL | 77 | 9 | 16 | 25 | 34 | 4 | 0 | 0 | 0 | 0 |
| 2018–19 | Los Angeles Kings | NHL | 60 | 4 | 14 | 18 | 8 | — | — | — | — | — |
| 2019–20 | Los Angeles Kings | NHL | 41 | 1 | 7 | 8 | 17 | — | — | — | — | — |
| 2019–20 | Vegas Golden Knights | NHL | 10 | 2 | 6 | 8 | 6 | 20 | 2 | 6 | 8 | 4 |
| 2020–21 | Vegas Golden Knights | NHL | 53 | 9 | 23 | 32 | 12 | 19 | 4 | 2 | 6 | 9 |
| 2021–22 | Vegas Golden Knights | NHL | 26 | 3 | 5 | 8 | 4 | — | — | — | — | — |
| 2022–23 | Vegas Golden Knights | NHL | 77 | 3 | 11 | 14 | 29 | 22 | 2 | 5 | 7 | 4 |
| 2023–24 | Vegas Golden Knights | NHL | 55 | 4 | 13 | 17 | 6 | 6 | 0 | 0 | 0 | 0 |
| 2024–25 | Chicago Blackhawks | NHL | 44 | 5 | 7 | 12 | 8 | — | — | — | — | — |
| NHL totals | | | 862 | 88 | 201 | 289 | 250 | 131 | 14 | 23 | 37 | 47 |

=== International ===
| Year | Team | Event | Result | GP | G | A | Pts | PIM |
|---|---|---|---|---|---|---|---|---|
| 2018 | United States | WC | 3rd place, bronze medalist(s) | 10 | 1 | 2 | 3 | 4 |
| 2019 | United States | WC | 7th | 8 | 0 | 4 | 4 | 0 |
| Senior totals | | | | 18 | 1 | 6 | 7 | 4 |

== Awards and honors ==
| Award | Year |
College
| All-CCHA First Team | 2007–08 |
| AHCA West Second-Team All-American | 2007–08 |
| CCHA All-Tournament Team | 2008 |
NHL
| Stanley Cup champion | 2012, 2014, 2023 |

Awards and achievements
| Preceded by Matt Hunwick | CCHA Best Defensive Defenseman; 2007–08 | Succeeded by Kyle Lawson |
