= William Carrier =

Canadian ice hockey player (born 1994)

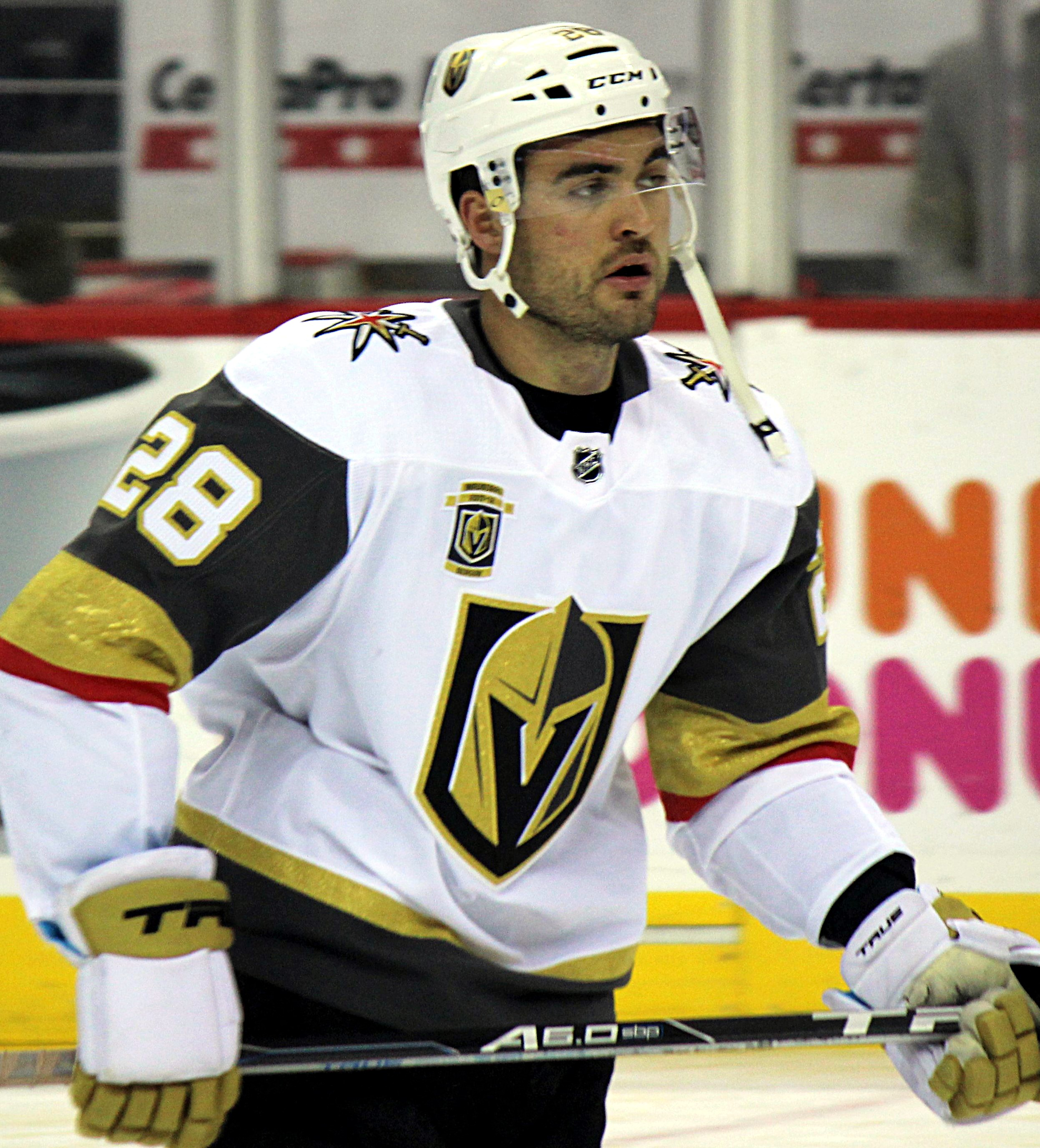
- Carrier with the Vegas Golden Knights in 2018
- Born: December 20, 1994 (age 31) LaSalle, Quebec, Canada
- Height: 6 ft 2 in (188 cm)
- Weight: 214 lb (97 kg; 15 st 4 lb)
- Position: Forward
- Shoots: Left
- NHL team Former teams: Carolina Hurricanes; Buffalo Sabres; Vegas Golden Knights
- NHL draft: 57th overall, 2013; St. Louis Blues
- Playing career: 2014–present

William Carrier (born December 20, 1994) is a Canadian professional ice hockey player who is a forward for the Carolina Hurricanes of the National Hockey League (NHL). Carrier was selected by the St. Louis Blues in the second round (57th pick overall) of the 2013 NHL entry draft. Carrier won the Stanley Cup with the Vegas Golden Knights in 2023 and the Hurricanes in 2026.

== Early life ==
Carrier was born in LaSalle, Quebec, but grew up in Pierrefonds, Quebec.

== Playing career ==
=== Youth ===
As a youth, Carrier played in the 2007 Quebec International Pee-Wee Hockey Tournament with a minor ice hockey team from Deux-Rives. During the 2009–10 season, Carrier played in three games for the midget AAA team Lac Saint-Louis Lions.

=== Major junior ===
Carrier was selected in the fourth round, 61st overall at the 2010 Quebec Major Junior Hockey League (QMJHL) draft by the Cape Breton Screaming Eagles. He recorded his first QMJHL goal on September 10, 2010, in a 3–2 win over the Halifax Mooseheads. Carrier was later selected to compete with Team Canada Quebec at the 2011 World U-17 Hockey Challenge, where he recorded five points in six games.

Leading up to the 2013 NHL Entry Draft, Carrier was lauded as a top-30 prospect. During a game against the Baie-Comeau Drakkar, Hockey Canada’s head scout Kevin Prendergast attended to view Carrier's play. Passed over in the first round, he was selected by the St. Louis Blues in the second round, 57th overall. On August 19, 2013, Carrier was signed to a three-year entry-level contract with the Blues.

In the 2013–14 season, on January 7, 2014, the Eagles traded Carrier along with Matthew Donnelly to the Drummondville Voltigeurs in exchange for Guillaume Gauthier, a first round pick in 2015, and a fifth round pick in 2014. Over a month later, Carrier was involved in a second trade as on February 28, 2014, the Blues traded his NHL contract, along with Chris Stewart, Jaroslav Halák, and 1st and 3rd round draft picks for the 2014 NHL entry draft to the Buffalo Sabres in exchange for netminder Ryan Miller and captain Steve Ott.

=== Professional ===
Carrier made his NHL debut on November 5, 2016, against the Ottawa Senators and recorded his first NHL goal against the Pittsburgh Penguins on November 19. During a game against the Boston Bruins in December 2016, Carrier was penalized for an illegal check to the head on David Backes, who suffered a concussion.

Having been left exposed by the Sabres for the 2017 NHL Expansion Draft, Carrier was selected by the Vegas Golden Knights on June 21, 2017. Carrier and the Golden Knights qualified for the 2018 Stanley Cup playoffs in their inaugural season. During the first round of the playoffs against the Los Angeles Kings, Carrier entered into concussion protocol as a result of an illegal check to the head by Drew Doughty. Carrier would be sat out another game during the Knights' third round against the Winnipeg Jets.

On February 27, 2020, Carrier signed a four-year, $5.6 million contract extension with the Golden Knights.

By the 2022–23 season, Carrier was one of six remaining original members of the Golden Knights, alongside Jonathan Marchessault, William Karlsson, Reilly Smith, Brayden McNabb and Shea Theodore. The team reached the Stanley Cup Final for the second time, winning the Stanley Cup over the Florida Panthers in five games.

Following seven seasons with the Golden Knights, Carrier left the organization as a free agent and was signed to a six-year, $12 million contract with the Carolina Hurricanes on July 3, 2024.. He would win his second Stanley Cup with the Hurricanes against his former team, four games to two on June 14, 2026.

== International play ==
Carrier was a member of the bronze medal winning Team Canada at 2012 IIHF World U18 Championships.

== Personal life ==
Carrier and his wife Caroline Vezina had their first child together in March 2020. After the birth of his daughter, he was told to stay home as a result of COVID-19 suspending play.

== Career statistics ==
=== Regular season and playoffs ===
			Regular season					Playoffs
Season	Team	League	GP	G	A	Pts	PIM	GP	G	A	Pts	PIM
2009–10	Lac St-Louis Lions	QMAAA	3	0	0	0	2	—	—	—	—	—
2010–11	Cape Breton Screaming Eagles	QMJHL	61	8	4	12	54	4	0	0	0	2
2011–12	Cape Breton Screaming Eagles	QMJHL	66	27	43	70	65	4	3	3	6	4
2012–13	Cape Breton Screaming Eagles	QMJHL	34	16	26	42	41	—	—	—	—	—
2013–14	Cape Breton Screaming Eagles	QMJHL	39	12	29	41	42	—	—	—	—	—
2013–14	Drummondville Voltigeurs	QMJHL	27	10	14	24	45	4	1	3	4	6
2014–15	Rochester Americans	AHL	63	7	14	21	38	—	—	—	—	—
2015–16	Rochester Americans	AHL	56	13	17	30	48	—	—	—	—	—
2016–17	Rochester Americans	AHL	8	3	2	5	6	—	—	—	—	—
2016–17	Buffalo Sabres	NHL	41	5	3	8	21	—	—	—	—	—
2017–18	Vegas Golden Knights	NHL	37	1	2	3	19	10	0	0	0	8
2018–19	Vegas Golden Knights	NHL	54	8	1	9	29	7	0	0	0	6
2019–20	Vegas Golden Knights	NHL	71	7	12	19	39	20	2	1	3	10
2020–21	Vegas Golden Knights	NHL	52	6	9	15	16	19	1	2	3	8
2021–22	Vegas Golden Knights	NHL	63	9	11	20	34	—	—	—	—	—
2022–23	Vegas Golden Knights	NHL	56	16	9	25	30	18	2	4	6	26
2023–24	Vegas Golden Knights	NHL	39	6	2	8	16	7	1	0	1	6
2024–25	Carolina Hurricanes	NHL	43	4	7	11	16	15	0	0	0	8
2025–26	Carolina Hurricanes	NHL	70	7	11	18	18	19	0	4	4	0
NHL totals			526	69	67	136	238	115	6	11	17	72

=== International ===
Year	Team	Event	Result	GP	G	A	Pts	PIM
2011	Canada Quebec	U17	4th	6	2	3	5	10
2012	Canada	U18	3rd place, bronze medalist(s)	7	0	0	0	0
Junior totals				13	2	3	5	10

== Awards and honours ==
Award	Year	Ref
NHL
Stanley Cup champion	2023, 2026	
International
IIHF World U18 Championship bronze medal	2012	
