= 2024–25 New York Rangers season =

National Hockey League season

2024–25 New York Rangers
- Division: 5th Metropolitan
- Conference: 11th Eastern
- 2024–25 record: 39–36–7
- Home record: 19–19–3
- Road record: 20–17–4
- Goals for: 256
- Goals against: 255

Team information
- General manager: Chris Drury
- Coach: Peter Laviolette
- Captain: Jacob Trouba (Oct 9 – Dec. 6); Vacant (Dec 6 – Apr. 17)
- Alternate captains: Adam Fox; Chris Kreider; Artemi Panarin; Mika Zibanejad
- Arena: Madison Square Garden
- Average attendance: 17,861
- Minor league affiliates: Hartford Wolf Pack (AHL); Bloomington Bison (ECHL)

Team leaders
- Goals: Artemi Panarin (37)
- Assists: Artemi Panarin (52)
- Points: Artemi Panarin (89)
- Penalty minutes: Matt Rempe (67)
- Plus/minus: Will Cuylle (+12)
- Wins: Igor Shesterkin (27)
- Goals against average: Louis Domingue (2.00)

The 2024–25 New York Rangers season was the franchise's 98th season of play and their 99th overall season. The Rangers entered the season as defending Presidents' Trophy winners. Despite a 12–4–1 start to the season, the Rangers followed that with a 4–15–0 stretch, and at one point they were eighth in the Metropolitan Division. They had a slight turnaround in January 2025, going 8–3–3, but a 5–4–0 stretch in February and a 6–6–3 stretch in March provided more trouble for the Rangers going into the playoff push in the tight Eastern Conference race.

On April 12, 2025, the Rangers were eliminated from playoff contention for the first time since the 2020–21 season following a 7–3 loss to the Carolina Hurricanes. They also became the fourth defending Presidents' Trophy champion to miss the playoffs the following season, after their 1992–93 team, the 2007–08 Buffalo Sabres, and the 2014–15 Boston Bruins and the first to do it twice.

== Controversies ==
The Rangers season was marred by several internal and external controversies that significantly impacted team dynamics and performance. A notable incident involved captain Jacob Trouba, who was reportedly pressured by management to waive his no-trade clause or face being placed on waivers. This situation caused unrest among players, as many felt the handling of the trade saga was mishandled and detrimental to team morale. Additionally, the team's decision to waive Barclay Goodrow during the 2024 off-season, circumventing his no-trade clause, further strained relationships within the locker room.

Public expressions of discontent from players such as Kaapo Kakko, Zac Jones, Jimmy Vesey, and Calvin de Haan highlighted the growing frustration with management's decisions, including inconsistent playing time and roster changes. The situation escalated with the leak of a trade memo in November 2024 from general manager Chris Drury, listing key players as available for trade such as Trouba and Chris Kreider, which occurred after losses to the Calgary Flames and Edmonton Oilers, while the Rangers held a 12–4–1 record. In April 2025, forward Artemi Panarin faced a sexual assault allegation from a former team employee, leading to a settlement in August 2024 and raising questions about his future with the team. These controversies collectively contributed to a season characterized by internal discord and underperformance.

== Standings ==
=== Divisional standings ===
Metropolitan Division
Pos	Team	GP	W	L	OTL	RW	GF	GA	GD	Pts
1	z – Washington Capitals	82	51	22	9	43	288	232	+56	111
2	x – Carolina Hurricanes	82	47	30	5	42	266	233	+33	99
3	x – New Jersey Devils	82	42	33	7	36	242	222	+20	91
4	Columbus Blue Jackets	82	40	33	9	30	273	268	+5	89
5	New York Rangers	82	39	36	7	35	256	255	+1	85
6	New York Islanders	82	35	35	12	28	224	260	−36	82
7	Pittsburgh Penguins	82	34	36	12	24	243	293	−50	80
8	Philadelphia Flyers	82	33	39	10	21	238	286	−48	76

Source: National Hockey League
Rules for classification: 1) Fewer number of games played (GP, only during regular season); 2) Greater number of regulation wins (RW); 3) Greater number of wins in regulation and overtime, excluding shootout wins (ROW); 4) Greater number of total wins, including shootouts (W); 5) Greater number of points earned in head-to-head play; if teams played an uneven number of head-to-head games, the result of the first game on the home ice of the team with the extra home game is discarded; 6) Greater goal differential (GD); 7) Greater number of goals scored (GF)
x – Clinched playoff spot; z – Clinched conference

=== Conference standings ===
Eastern Conference Wild Card
Pos	Div	Team	GP	W	L	OTL	RW	GF	GA	GD	Pts
1	AT	x – Ottawa Senators	82	45	30	7	35	243	234	+9	97
2	AT	x – Montreal Canadiens	82	40	31	11	30	245	265	−20	91
3	ME	Columbus Blue Jackets	82	40	33	9	30	273	268	+5	89
4	AT	Detroit Red Wings	82	39	35	8	30	238	259	−21	86
5	ME	New York Rangers	82	39	36	7	35	256	255	+1	85
6	ME	New York Islanders	82	35	35	12	28	224	260	−36	82
7	ME	Pittsburgh Penguins	82	34	36	12	24	243	293	−50	80
8	AT	Buffalo Sabres	82	36	39	7	29	269	289	−20	79
9	AT	Boston Bruins	82	33	39	10	26	222	272	−50	76
10	ME	Philadelphia Flyers	82	33	39	10	21	238	286	−48	76

Source: National Hockey League
Rules for classification: 1) Fewer number of games played (GP, only during regular season); 2) Greater number of regulation wins (RW); 3) Greater number of wins in regulation and overtime, excluding shootout wins (ROW); 4) Greater number of total wins, including shootouts (W); 5) Greater number of points earned in head-to-head play; if teams played an uneven number of head-to-head games, the result of the first game on the home ice of the team with the extra home game is discarded; 6) Greater goal differential (GD); 7) Greater number of goals scored (GF)
x – Clinched playoff spot

== Schedule and results ==
=== Preseason ===
The preseason schedule was published on June 20, 2024.

2024 preseason game log: 4–2–0 (home: 3–0–0; road: 1–2–0)

Game	Date	Opponent	Score	OT	Decision	Location	Attendance	Record
1	September 22	@ Boston	3–2		Domingue	TD Garden	17,850	1–0–0
2	September 24	NY Islanders	6–4		Quick	Madison Square Garden	16,568	2–0–0
3	September 26	Boston	5–2		Quick	Madison Square Garden	16,205	3–0–0
4	September 30	@ New Jersey	1–3		Quick	Prudential Center	13,444	3–1–0
5	October 1	New Jersey	5–4		Garand	Madison Square Garden	17,110	4–1–0
6	October 4	@ NY Islanders	2–5		Shesterkin	UBS Arena	16,106	4–2–0

=== Regular season ===
The regular season schedule was published on June 27, 2024.

2024–25 game log
October: 6–2–1, 13 points (home: 2–1–1; road: 4–1–0)

Game	Date	Opponent	Score	OT	Decision	Location	Attendance	Record	Points	Recap
1	October 9	@ Pittsburgh	6–0		Shesterkin	PPG Paints Arena	18,190	1–0–0	2	
2	October 12	Utah	5–6	OT	Shesterkin	Madison Square Garden	18,006	1–0–1	3	
3	October 14	Detroit	4–1		Shesterkin	Madison Square Garden	17,510	2–0–1	5	
4	October 17	@ Detroit	5–2		Quick	Little Caesars Arena	19,515	3–0–1	7	
5	October 19	@ Toronto	4–1		Shesterkin	Scotiabank Arena	15,777	4–0–1	9	
6	October 22	@ Montreal	7–2		Shesterkin	Bell Centre	21,105	5–0–1	11	
7	October 24	Florida	1–3		Shesterkin	Madison Square Garden	18,006	5–1–1	11	
8	October 26	Anaheim	2–1		Quick	Madison Square Garden	18,006	6–1–1	13	
9	October 29	@ Washington	3–5		Shesterkin	Capital One Arena	17,390	6–2–1	13	

November: 7–7–0, 14 points (home: 4–3–0; road: 3–4–0)

Game	Date	Opponent	Score	OT	Decision	Location	Attendance	Record	Points	Recap
10	November 1	Ottawa	2–1		Shesterkin	Madison Square Garden	18,006	7–2–1	15	
11	November 3	NY Islanders	5–2		Shesterkin	Madison Square Garden	18,006	8–2–1	17	
12	November 7	Buffalo	1–6		Shesterkin	Madison Square Garden	18,006	8–3–1	17	
13	November 9	@ Detroit	4–0		Quick	Little Caesars Arena	19,515	9–3–1	19	
14	November 12	Winnipeg	3–6		Shesterkin	Madison Square Garden	18,006	9–4–1	19	
15	November 14	San Jose	3–2		Shesterkin	Madison Square Garden	18,006	10–4–1	21	
16	November 17	@ Seattle	2–0		Quick	Climate Pledge Arena	17,151	11–4–1	23	
17	November 19	@ Vancouver	4–3		Shesterkin	Rogers Arena	18,688	12–4–1	25	
18	November 21	@ Calgary	2–3		Shesterkin	Scotiabank Saddledome	17,033	12–5–1	25	
19	November 23	@ Edmonton	2–6		Quick	Rogers Place	18,347	12–6–1	25	
20	November 25	St. Louis	2–5		Shesterkin	Madison Square Garden	18,006	12–7–1	25	
21	November 27	@ Carolina	3–4		Shesterkin	Lenovo Center	18,905	12–8–1	25	
22	November 29	@ Philadelphia	1–3		Shesterkin	Wells Fargo Center	19,346	12–9–1	25	
23	November 30	Montreal	4–3		Quick	Madison Square Garden	18,006	13–9–1	27	

December: 3–10–0, 6 points (home: 1–5–0; road: 2–5–0)

Game	Date	Opponent	Score	OT	Decision	Location	Attendance	Record	Points	Recap
24	December 2	New Jersey	1–5		Shesterkin	Madison Square Garden	18,006	13–10–1	27	
25	December 6	Pittsburgh	4–2		Shesterkin	Madison Square Garden	18,006	14–10–1	29	
26	December 8	Seattle	5–7		Quick	Madison Square Garden	18,006	14–11–1	29	
27	December 9	Chicago	1–2		Shesterkin	Madison Square Garden	18,006	14–12–1	29	
28	December 11	@ Buffalo	3–2		Shesterkin	KeyBank Center	15,815	15–12–1	31	
29	December 14	Los Angeles	1–5		Shesterkin	Madison Square Garden	18,006	15–13–1	31	
30	December 15	@ St. Louis	2–3		Quick	Enterprise Center	17,569	15–14–1	31	
31	December 17	@ Nashville	0–2		Shesterkin	Bridgestone Arena	17,159	15–15–1	31	
32	December 20	@ Dallas	3–1		Shesterkin	American Airlines Center	18,532	16–15–1	33	
33	December 22	Carolina	1–3		Shesterkin	Madison Square Garden	18,006	16–16–1	33	
34	December 23	@ New Jersey	0–5		Quick	Prudential Center	16,514	16–17–1	33	
35	December 28	@ Tampa Bay	2–6		Shesterkin	Amalie Arena	19,092	16–18–1	33	
36	December 30	@ Florida	3–5		Shesterkin	Amerant Bank Arena	19,556	16–19–1	33	

January: 8–3–3, 19 points (home: 5–2–1; road: 3–1–2)

Game	Date	Opponent	Score	OT	Decision	Location	Attendance	Record	Points	Recap
37	January 2	Boston	2–1		Quick	Madison Square Garden	18,006	17–19–1	35	
38	January 4	@ Washington	4–7		Quick	Capital One Arena	18,573	17–20–1	35	
39	January 5	@ Chicago	6–2		Domingue	United Center	18,819	18–20–1	37	
40	January 7	Dallas	4–5	OT	Quick	Madison Square Garden	18,006	18–20–2	38	
41	January 9	New Jersey	3–2	OT	Shesterkin	Madison Square Garden	18,006	19–20–2	40	
42	January 11	@ Vegas	2–1		Shesterkin	T-Mobile Arena	18,114	20–20–2	42	
43	January 14	@ Colorado	2–3	OT	Shesterkin	Ball Arena	18,037	20–20–3	43	
44	January 16	@ Utah	5–3		Shesterkin	Delta Center	11,131	21–20–3	45	
45	January 18	Columbus	1–0	OT	Shesterkin	Madison Square Garden	18,006	22–20–3	47	
46	January 19	@ Montreal	4–5	OT	Quick	Bell Centre	21,105	22–20–4	48	
47	January 21	Ottawa	5–0		Shesterkin	Madison Square Garden	17,662	23–20–4	50	
48	January 23	Philadelphia	6–1		Shesterkin	Madison Square Garden	18,006	24–20–4	52	
49	January 26	Colorado	4–5		Shesterkin	Madison Square Garden	18,006	24–21–4	52	
50	January 28	Carolina	0–4		Shesterkin	Madison Square Garden	17,629	24–22–4	52	

February: 5–4–0, 10 points (home: 2–2–0; road: 3–2–0)

Game	Date	Opponent	Score	OT	Decision	Location	Attendance	Record	Points	Recap
51	February 1	@ Boston	3–6		Shesterkin	TD Garden	17,850	24–23–4	52	
52	February 2	Vegas	4–2		Quick	Madison Square Garden	18,006	25–23–4	54	
53	February 5	Boston	3–2		Shesterkin	Madison Square Garden	18,006	26–23–4	56	
54	February 7	Pittsburgh	3–2		Shesterkin	Madison Square Garden	18,006	26–24–4	56	
55	February 8	@ Columbus	4–3		Quick	Nationwide Arena	18,755	27–24–4	58	
56	February 22	@ Buffalo	2–8		Shesterkin	KeyBank Center	19,070	27–25–4	58	
57	February 23	@ Pittsburgh	5–3		Shesterkin	PPG Paints Arena	17,186	28–25–4	60	
58	February 25	@ NY Islanders	5–1		Shesterkin	UBS Arena	17,255	29–25–4	62	
59	February 28	Toronto	2–3		Shesterkin	Madison Square Garden	18,006	29–26–4	62	

March: 6–6–3, 15 points (home: 3–4–1; road: 3–2–2)

Game	Date	Opponent	Score	OT	Decision	Location	Attendance	Record	Points	Recap
60	March 2	Nashville	4–0		Quick	Madison Square Garden	17,336	30–26–4	64	
61	March 3	NY Islanders	4–0		Shesterkin	Madison Square Garden	17,475	31–26–4	66	
62	March 5	Washington	2–3	OT	Shesterkin	Madison Square Garden	18,006	31–26–5	67	
63	March 8	@ Ottawa	3–4	OT	Shesterkin	Canadian Tire Centre	18,224	31–26–6	68	
64	March 9	Columbus	3–7		Quick	Madison Square Garden	18,006	31–27–6	68	
65	March 11	@ Winnipeg	1–2		Shesterkin	Canada Life Centre	14,278	31–28–6	68	
66	March 13	@ Minnesota	3–2	OT	Shesterkin	Xcel Energy Center	18,976	32–28–6	70	
67	March 15	@ Columbus	4–0		Shesterkin	Nationwide Arena	18,464	33–28–6	72	
68	March 16	Edmonton	1–3		Shesterkin	Madison Square Garden	18,006	33–29–6	72	
69	March 18	Calgary	1–2		Shesterkin	Madison Square Garden	17,591	33–30–6	72	
70	March 20	Toronto	3–4		Shesterkin	Madison Square Garden	17,235	33–31–6	72	
71	March 22	Vancouver	5–3		Shesterkin	Madison Square Garden	18,006	34–31–6	74	
72	March 25	@ Los Angeles	1–3		Shesterkin	Crypto.com Arena	17,022	34–32–6	74	
73	March 28	@ Anaheim	4–5	OT	Shesterkin	Honda Center	16,197	34–32–7	75	
74	March 29	@ San Jose	6–1		Quick	SAP Center	17,435	35–32–7	77	

April: 4–4–0, 8 points (home: 2–2–0; road: 2–2–0)

Game	Date	Opponent	Score	OT	Decision	Location	Attendance	Record	Points	Recap
75	April 2	Minnesota	5–4	OT	Shesterkin	Madison Square Garden	17,492	36–32–7	79	
76	April 5	@ New Jersey	0–4		Shesterkin	Prudential Center	16,514	36–33–7	79	
77	April 7	Tampa Bay	1–5		Shesterkin	Madison Square Garden	17,130	36–34–7	79	
78	April 9	Philadelphia	5–8		Quick	Madison Square Garden	17,530	36–35–7	79	
79	April 10	@ NY Islanders	9–2		Shesterkin	UBS Arena	17,255	37–35–7	81	
80	April 12	@ Carolina	3–7		Shesterkin	Lenovo Center	18,880	37–36–7	81	
81	April 14	@ Florida	5–3		Quick	Amerant Bank Arena	19,453	38–36–7	83	
82	April 17	Tampa Bay	4–0		Shesterkin	Madison Square Garden	18,006	39–36–7	85	

Legend: Win (2 points) Loss (0 points) Overtime/shootout loss (1 point)

== Player statistics ==
=== Skaters ===
Regular season
Player	GP	G	A	Pts	+/−	PIM
Artemi Panarin	80	37	52	89	–9	16
Mika Zibanejad	82	20	42	62	–22	22
Adam Fox	74	10	51	61	+9	32
Vincent Trocheck	82	26	33	59	0	44
Will Cuylle	82	20	25	45	+12	42
Alexis Lafreniere	82	17	28	45	–13	38
J. T. Miller^{†}	32	13	22	35	−2	18
Chris Kreider	68	22	8	30	–5	24
Reilly Smith^{‡}	58	10	19	29	−1	22
K'Andre Miller	74	7	20	27	0	22
Braden Schneider	80	6	15	21	+9	18
Filip Chytil^{‡}	41	11	9	20	+4	14
Sam Carrick	80	6	14	20	+5	58
Jonny Brodzinski	51	12	7	19	+6	4
Ryan Lindgren^{‡}	54	2	17	19	+1	36
Urho Vaakanainen^{†}	46	2	13	15	+8	16
Kaapo Kakko^{‡}	30	4	10	14	+9	14
Will Borgen^{†}	51	4	9	13	+9	33
Zac Jones	46	1	10	11	0	24
Brett Berard	35	6	4	10	–6	8
Adam Edstrom	51	5	4	9	–5	27
Matt Rempe	42	3	5	8	+7	67
Jimmy Vesey^{‡}	33	4	2	6	−2	0
Jacob Trouba^{‡}	24	0	6	6	–3	22
Juuso Parssinen^{†}	11	2	3	5	+1	11
Victor Mancini^{‡}	15	1	4	5	−3	2
Arthur Kaliyev	14	3	1	4	+2	2
Carson Soucy^{†}	16	1	2	3	+2	4
Brennan Othmann	22	0	2	2	+7	2
Calvin de Haan^{†}	3	0	1	1	+4	2
Chad Ruhwedel	5	0	1	1	+2	0
Matthew Robertson	2	0	0	0	+3	0
Connor Mackey	2	0	0	0	0	5
Nicolas Aube-Kubel^{†}	3	0	0	0	−1	2
Gabe Perreault	5	0	0	0	−1	0

=== Goaltenders ===
Regular season
Player	GP	GS	TOI	W	L	OT	GA	GAA	SA	SV%	SO	G	A	PIM
Igor Shesterkin	61	61	3,505:08	27	29	5	167	2.86	1,751	.905	6	0	0	6
Jonathan Quick	24	20	1,325:41	11	7	2	70	3.17	657	.893	3	0	1	2
Louis Domingue	1	1	60:00	1	0	0	2	2.00	27	.926	0	0	0	0

- ^{†} Denotes player spent time with another team before joining the Rangers. Stats reflect time with the Rangers only.
- ^{‡} Denotes player was traded mid-season. Stats reflect time with the Rangers only.
- Bold/italics denotes franchise record.

== Awards and honors ==
=== Awards ===
Regular season
Player	Award	Date
Will Cuylle	Steven McDonald Extra Effort Award	April 2, 2025
Jonathan Quick	Mr. Ranger Award	April 8, 2025

=== Milestones ===
Regular season
Player	Milestone	Reached
Victor Mancini	1st NHL career game	October 9, 2024
Victor Mancini	1st NHL career goal	October 17, 2024
Victor Mancini	1st NHL career assist	October 21, 2024
Vincent Trocheck	200th NHL career goal	November 3, 2024
Will Cuylle	100th NHL career game	November 14, 2024
Brett Berard	1st NHL career game 1st NHL career point	November 25, 2024
Brett Berard	1st NHL career goal	November 27, 2024
Mika Zibanejad	300th NHL career goal (8th Swedish player in NHL history)	December 11, 2024
Mika Zibanejad	900th NHL career game	February 2, 2025
Chris Kreider	12th NHL career short-handed goal (Most in NHL history since the start of 2021–22 season)	February 5, 2025
Jimmy Vesey	100th NHL career goal	February 23, 2025
Jonathan Quick	63rd NHL career shutout 800th NHL career game	March 2, 2025
Gabe Perreault	1st NHL career game	April 2, 2025
Gabe Perreault	1st NHL career point	April 5, 2025
Artemi Panarin	300th NHL career goal	April 8, 2025
Brett Berard	1st NHL career 2-goal game	April 10, 2025
Will Cuylle	1st NHL career 20-goal season	April 12, 2025

=== Records ===
Regular season
Player	Record	Reached
Artemi Panarin	1st Ranger in franchise history to have multiple points in each of the first 4 games in a season	October 17, 2024
Jonathan Quick	Tied-18th place for most career shutouts in NHL history (61 with Turk Broda)	November 9, 2024
Chris Kreider	2nd Ranger in franchise history to have the most game winning goals (46 goals in 832 games, passing Jean Ratelle)	November 19, 2024
Jonathan Quick	15th place for most career wins in NHL history (398)	November 30, 2024
Jonathan Quick	1st American-born goaltender to win 400 career games in NHL history	February 2, 2025

== Transactions ==
The Rangers have been involved in the following transactions during the 2024–25 season.

Key:

† Contract is entry-level.
‡ Contract initially takes effect in the 2025-26 season.

=== Trades ===
Date	Details		Ref
June 29, 2024	To Nashville Predators 4th-round pick in 2024 NHL entry draft (#127 overall) Became Viktor Norringer; 7th-round pick in 2026 NHL entry draft	To New York Rangers 4th-round pick in 2024 (#119 overall) Became Raoul Boilard	
July 1, 2024	To Pittsburgh Penguins conditional MIN 5th-round pick in 2025 NHL entry draft or NYR 5th-round pick in 2025; 2nd-round pick in 2027 NHL entry draft	To New York Rangers Reilly Smith*	
December 6, 2024	To Anaheim Ducks Jacob Trouba	To New York Rangers Urho Vaakanainen conditional ANA 4th-round pick in 2025 or DET 4th-round pick in 2025	
January 26, 2025	To Tampa Bay Lightning Ryder Korczak	To New York Rangers Lucas Edmonds	
January 31, 2025	To Vancouver Canucks Filip Chytil; Victor Mancini conditional 1st-round pick in 2025 or 2026	To New York Rangers Erik Brannstrom; Jackson Dorrington; J. T. Miller	
March 1, 2025	To Colorado Avalanche Hank Kempf; Ryan Lindgren*; Jimmy Vesey	To New York Rangers Calvin de Haan; Juuso Parssinen conditional CAR 2nd-round pick in 2025 or NYR 2nd-round pick in 2025 conditional COL 4th-round pick in 2025 or VAN 4th-round pick in 2025	
March 6, 2025	To Vegas Golden Knights Reilly Smith	To New York Rangers Brendan Brisson; SJS 3rd-round pick in 2025 NHL entry draft	
March 6, 2025	To Vancouver Canucks SJS 3rd-round pick in 2025 (#65 overall) Became Kieren Dervin	To New York Rangers Carson Soucy	
March 7, 2025	To Buffalo Sabres Erik Brannstrom	To New York Rangers Nicolas Aube-Kubel	
June 12, 2025	To Anaheim Ducks Chris Kreider; ANA 4th-round pick in 2025 (#104 overall) Became Elijah Neuenschwander	To New York Rangers Carey Terrance; TOR 3rd-round pick in 2025 (#89 overall) Became Artyom Gonchar	

=== Free agents ===
Date	Player	Team	Contract term	Ref
July 1, 2024	Sam Carrick	from Edmonton Oilers	3-year	
July 1, 2024	Nikolas Brouillard	to Seattle Kraken	1-year	
July 1, 2024	Erik Gustafsson	to Detroit Red Wings	2-year	
July 1, 2024	Mac Hollowell	to Pittsburgh Penguins	1-year	
July 1, 2024	Alexander Wennberg	to San Jose Sharks	2-year	
July 2, 2024	Casey Fitzgerald	from Colorado Avalanche	2-year	
July 2, 2024	Benoit-Olivier Groulx	from Anaheim Ducks	1-year	
July 4, 2024	Jack Roslovic	to Carolina Hurricanes	1-year	
April 1, 2025	Callum Tung	from UConn Huskies (HE)	3-year†	

=== Waivers ===
Date	Player	Team	Ref
January 6, 2025	Arthur Kaliyev	from Los Angeles Kings	

=== Contract terminations ===
Date	Player	Via	Ref

=== Retirement ===
Date	Player	Ref
June 18, 2025	Nick Bonino	

=== Signings ===
Date	Player	Term	Ref
July 12, 2024	Chad Ruhwedel	1-year	
July 13, 2024	Braden Schneider	2-year	
July 15, 2024	Matthew Robertson	1-year	
July 30, 2024	Ryan Lindgren	1-year	
October 25, 2024	Alexis Lafreniere	7-year‡	
December 6, 2024	Igor Shesterkin	8-year‡	
March 12, 2025	Jonathan Quick	1-year‡	
June 18, 2025	Matt Rempe	2-year‡	
June 20, 2025	Matthew Robertson	2-year‡	
June 23, 2025	Adam Edstrom	2-year‡	

== Draft picks ==
Below are the New York Rangers' selections at the 2024 NHL entry draft, which was held on June 28 and 29, 2024, at the Sphere in Paradise, Nevada.

Round	#	Player	Pos	Nationality	College/junior/club team
1	30	D	E. J. Emery	United States	U.S. NDTP (USHL)
4	119	C	Raoul Boilard	Canada	Baie-Comeau Drakkar (QMJHL)
5	159	LW	Nathan Aspinall	Canada	Flint Firebirds (OHL)
6	191	LW	Rico Gredig	Switzerland	HC Davos (National League)
