= 2024–25 Columbus Blue Jackets season =

National Hockey League season

2024–25 Columbus Blue Jackets
- Division: 4th Metropolitan
- Conference: 9th Eastern
- 2024–25 record: 40–33–9
- Home record: 26–10–5
- Road record: 14–23–4
- Goals for: 273
- Goals against: 268

Team information
- General manager: Don Waddell
- Coach: Dean Evason
- Captain: Boone Jenner
- Alternate captains: Erik Gudbranson; Sean Kuraly; Zach Werenski
- Arena: Nationwide Arena
- Average attendance: 18,935
- Minor league affiliate: Cleveland Monsters (AHL)

Team leaders
- Goals: Adam Fantilli; Kirill Marchenko (31)
- Assists: Zach Werenski (59)
- Points: Zach Werenski (82)
- Penalty minutes: Mathieu Olivier (139)
- Plus/minus: Kirill Marchenko (+29)
- Wins: Elvis Merzlikins (26)
- Goals against average: Jet Greaves (1.91)

The 2024–25 Columbus Blue Jackets season was the 25th season for the National Hockey League (NHL) franchise that was established on June 25, 1997. The season was marred by the tragic passing of star player Johnny Gaudreau, who, along with his brother Matthew, were killed while riding their bikes on August 29, 2024, after being hit from behind by a suspected drunk driver. The team dedicated the season in his memory.

Despite a strong late-season push, the Blue Jackets were eliminated from playoff contention for the fifth consecutive season for the first time since the 2002–03 season and the 2007–08 season on April 16 after the Montreal Canadiens defeated the Carolina Hurricanes.

== Standings ==
=== Divisional standings ===
Metropolitan Division
Pos	Team	GP	W	L	OTL	RW	GF	GA	GD	Pts
1	z – Washington Capitals	82	51	22	9	43	288	232	+56	111
2	x – Carolina Hurricanes	82	47	30	5	42	266	233	+33	99
3	x – New Jersey Devils	82	42	33	7	36	242	222	+20	91
4	Columbus Blue Jackets	82	40	33	9	30	273	268	+5	89
5	New York Rangers	82	39	36	7	35	256	255	+1	85
6	New York Islanders	82	35	35	12	28	224	260	−36	82
7	Pittsburgh Penguins	82	34	36	12	24	243	293	−50	80
8	Philadelphia Flyers	82	33	39	10	21	238	286	−48	76

Source: National Hockey League
Rules for classification: 1) Fewer number of games played (GP, only during regular season); 2) Greater number of regulation wins (RW); 3) Greater number of wins in regulation and overtime, excluding shootout wins (ROW); 4) Greater number of total wins, including shootouts (W); 5) Greater number of points earned in head-to-head play; if teams played an uneven number of head-to-head games, the result of the first game on the home ice of the team with the extra home game is discarded; 6) Greater goal differential (GD); 7) Greater number of goals scored (GF)
x – Clinched playoff spot; z – Clinched conference

=== Conference standings ===
Eastern Conference Wild Card
Pos	Div	Team	GP	W	L	OTL	RW	GF	GA	GD	Pts
1	AT	x – Ottawa Senators	82	45	30	7	35	243	234	+9	97
2	AT	x – Montreal Canadiens	82	40	31	11	30	245	265	−20	91
3	ME	Columbus Blue Jackets	82	40	33	9	30	273	268	+5	89
4	AT	Detroit Red Wings	82	39	35	8	30	238	259	−21	86
5	ME	New York Rangers	82	39	36	7	35	256	255	+1	85
6	ME	New York Islanders	82	35	35	12	28	224	260	−36	82
7	ME	Pittsburgh Penguins	82	34	36	12	24	243	293	−50	80
8	AT	Buffalo Sabres	82	36	39	7	29	269	289	−20	79
9	AT	Boston Bruins	82	33	39	10	26	222	272	−50	76
10	ME	Philadelphia Flyers	82	33	39	10	21	238	286	−48	76

Source: National Hockey League
Rules for classification: 1) Fewer number of games played (GP, only during regular season); 2) Greater number of regulation wins (RW); 3) Greater number of wins in regulation and overtime, excluding shootout wins (ROW); 4) Greater number of total wins, including shootouts (W); 5) Greater number of points earned in head-to-head play; if teams played an uneven number of head-to-head games, the result of the first game on the home ice of the team with the extra home game is discarded; 6) Greater goal differential (GD); 7) Greater number of goals scored (GF)
x – Clinched playoff spot

== Schedule and results ==
=== Preseason ===
The Columbus Blue Jackets preseason schedule was released on June 21, 2024.

2024 preseason game log: 4–4–0 (home: 2–2–0; road: 2–2–0)
#	Date	Visitor	Score	Home	OT	Decision	Attendance	Record	Recap
1	September 23	Columbus	1–6	Buffalo		Greaves	9,924	0–1–0
2	September 25	St. Louis	0–3	Columbus		Merzlikins	10,077	1–1–0
3	September 27	Columbus	8–4	Washington		Tarasov	13,009	2–1–0
4	September 28	Buffalo	3–6	Columbus		Merzlikins	12,305	3–1–0
5	September 30	Washington	3–2	Columbus		Tarasov	10,080	3–2–0
6	October 1	Columbus	3–1	St. Louis		Greaves	15,305	4–2–0
7	October 3	Pittsburgh	3–1	Columbus		Merzlikins	12,649	4–3–0
8	October 4	Columbus	3–7	Pittsburgh		Tarasov	14,573	4–4–0

=== Regular season ===
The Columbus Blue Jackets regular season schedule was released on July 2, 2024.

2024–25 game log

October: 5–3–1 (home: 4–2–0; road: 1–1–1)
#	Date	Visitor	Score	Home	OT	Decision	Attendance	Record	Pts	Recap
1	October 10	Columbus	2–3	Minnesota		Merzlikins	18,613	0–1–0	0
2	October 12	Columbus	6–4	Colorado		Tarasov	18,080	1–1–0	2
3	October 15	Florida	4–3	Columbus		Merzlikins	18,484	1–2–0	2
4	October 17	Buffalo	4–6	Columbus		Tarasov	16,126	2–2–0	4
5	October 19	Minnesota	3–1	Columbus		Tarasov	16,876	2–3–0	4
6	October 22	Toronto	2–6	Columbus		Tarasov	14,852	3–3–0	6
7	October 26	Columbus	3–4	Nashville	OT	Tarasov	17,159	3–3–1	7
8	October 28	Edmonton	1–6	Columbus		Merzlikins	15,227	4–3–1	9
9	October 30	NY Islanders	0–2	Columbus		Merzlikins	14,015	5–3–1	11

November: 5–6–2 (home: 4–1–1; road: 1–5–1)
#	Date	Visitor	Score	Home	OT	Decision	Attendance	Record	Pts	Recap
10	November 1	Winnipeg	6–2	Columbus		Merzlikins	15,823	5–4–1	11
11	November 2	Columbus	2–7	Washington		Tarasov	17,666	5–5–1	11
12	November 5	Columbus	1–2	San Jose	OT	Merzlikins	10,376	5–5–2	12
13	November 9	Columbus	2–5	Los Angeles		Merzlikins	18,145	5–6–2	12
14	November 10	Columbus	2–4	Anaheim		Tarasov	16,153	5–7–2	12
15	November 12	Columbus	2–5	Seattle		Merzlikins	17,151	5–8–2	12
16	November 15	Pittsburgh	2–6	Columbus		Merzlikins	18,348	6–8–2	14
17	November 16	Columbus	1–5	Montreal		Tarasov	21,105	6–9–2	14
18	November 18	Columbus	5–1	Boston		Merzlikins	17,850	7–9–2	16
19	November 21	Tampa Bay	6–7	Columbus	OT	Merzlikins	16,260	8–9–2	18
20	November 23	Carolina	4–5	Columbus	SO	Merzlikins	16,013	9–9–2	20
21	November 27	Montreal	4–3	Columbus	OT	Merzlikins	15,485	9–9–3	21
22	November 29	Calgary	2–5	Columbus		Merzlikins	17,035	10–9–3	23

December: 6–7–3 (home: 4–1–2; road: 2–6–1)
#	Date	Visitor	Score	Home	OT	Decision	Attendance	Record	Pts	Recap
23	December 1	Columbus	6–3	Chicago		Merzlikins	17,393	11–9–3	25
24	December 3	Columbus	0–3	Calgary		Merzlikins	17,386	11–10–3	25
25	December 5	Columbus	3–6	Edmonton		Tarasov	18,347	11–11–3	25
26	December 6	Columbus	2–5	Vancouver		Merzlikins	18,529	11–12–3	25
27	December 8	Columbus	4–1	Winnipeg		Merzlikins	13,887	12–12–3	27
28	December 10	Philadelphia	5–3	Columbus		Merzlikins	15,467	12–13–3	27
29	December 12	Washington	2–1	Columbus	OT	Greaves	15,962	12–13–4	28
30	December 14	Anaheim	4–3	Columbus	OT	Greaves	17,663	12–13–5	29
31	December 15	Columbus	1–4	Carolina		Merzlikins	18,700	12–14–5	29
32	December 17	Columbus	3–5	Tampa Bay		Greaves	19,092	12–15–5	29
33	December 19	New Jersey	2–4	Columbus		Merzlikins	15,793	13–15–5	31
34	December 21	Columbus	4–5	Philadelphia	OT	Merzlikins	18,644	13–15–6	32
35	December 23	Montreal	4–5	Columbus		Greaves	17,875	14–15–6	34
36	December 27	Boston	2–6	Columbus		Merzlikins	18,821	15–15–6	36
37	December 28	Columbus	0–4	Boston		Tarasov	17,850	15–16–6	36
38	December 31	Carolina	3–4	Columbus	SO	Merzlikins	17,712	16–16–6	38

January: 10–3–1 (home: 5–1–0; road: 5–2–1)
#	Date	Visitor	Score	Home	OT	Decision	Attendance	Record	Pts	Recap
39	January 2	Detroit	5–4	Columbus		Merzlikins	18,370	16–17–6	38
40	January 4	St. Louis	4–6	Columbus		Merzlikins	18,535	17–17–6	40
41	January 7	Columbus	4–3	Pittsburgh	SO	Merzlikins	16,060	18–17–6	42
42	January 9	Seattle	2–6	Columbus		Merzlikins	15,497	19–17–6	44
43	January 11	Columbus	2–1	St. Louis		Greaves	17,591	20–17–6	46
44	January 14	Philadelphia	2–3	Columbus	SO	Tarasov	15,018	21–17–6	48
45	January 16	San Jose	1–4	Columbus		Merzlikins	15,943	22–17–6	50
46	January 18	Columbus	0–1	NY Rangers	SO	Tarasov	18,006	22–17–7	51
47	January 20	Columbus	1–3	NY Islanders		Merzlikins	14,551	22–18–7	51
48	January 22	Columbus	5–1	Toronto		Merzlikins	18,459	23–18–7	53
49	January 23	Columbus	4–7	Carolina		Tarasov	18,700	23–19–7	53
50	January 25	Los Angeles	2–3	Columbus	OT	Merzlikins	18,919	24–19–7	55
51	January 30	Columbus	2–1	Vegas	OT	Merzlikins	17,783	25–19–7	57
52	January 31	Columbus	3–2	Utah	OT	Tarasov	11,131	26–19–7	59

February: 3–3–1 (home: 2–1–1; road: 1–2–0)
#	Date	Visitor	Score	Home	OT	Decision	Attendance	Record	Pts	Recap
53	February 2	Columbus	3–5	Dallas		Merzlikins	18,532	26–20–7	59
54	February 4	Columbus	2–3	Buffalo		Merzlikins	14,198	26–21–7	59
55	February 6	Utah	3–2	Columbus	OT	Merzlikins	18,553	26–21–8	60
56	February 8	NY Rangers	4–3	Columbus		Merzlikins	18,755	26–22–8	60
57	February 22	Chicago	1–5	Columbus		Merzlikins	18,809	27–22–8	62
58	February 25	Dallas	4–6	Columbus		Merzlikins	16,897	28–22–8	64
59	February 27	Columbus	5–2	Detroit		Tarasov	19,515	29–22–8	66

March: 4–8–1 (home: 2–3–1; road: 2–5–0)
#	Date	Visitor	Score	Home	OT	Decision	Attendance	Record	Pts	Recap
60	March 1	Detroit	3–5	Columbus		Merzlikins	94,751 (outdoors)	30–22–8	68
61	March 4	Columbus	2–6	Tampa Bay		Merzlikins	19,092	30–23–8	68
62	March 6	Columbus	0–3	Florida		Merzlikins	19,402	30–24–8	68
63	March 9	Columbus	7–3	NY Rangers		Tarasov	18,006	31–24–8	70
64	March 11	Columbus	3–5	New Jersey		Merzlikins	15,630	31–25–8	70
65	March 13	Vegas	4–0	Columbus		Merzlikins	18,823	31–26–8	70
66	March 15	NY Rangers	4–0	Columbus		Tarasov	18,464	31–27–8	70
67	March 17	New Jersey	2–1	Columbus		Greaves	16,708	31–28–8	70
68	March 20	Florida	1–0	Columbus	OT	Merzlikins	16,757	31–28–9	71
69	March 21	Columbus	3–6	Pittsburgh		Merzlikins	17,222	31–29–9	71
70	March 24	Columbus	4–3	NY Islanders	SO	Merzlikins	14,158	32–29–9	73
71	March 28	Vancouver	6–7	Columbus	SO	Merzlikins	18,586	33–29–9	75
72	March 29	Columbus	2–3	Ottawa		Tarasov	17,758	33–30–9	75

April: 7–3–0 (home: 5–1–0; road: 2–2–0)
#	Date	Visitor	Score	Home	OT	Decision	Attendance	Record	Pts	Recap
73	April 1	Nashville	4–8	Columbus		Merzlikins	15,605	34–30–9	77
74	April 3	Colorado	7–3	Columbus		Merzlikins	18,392	34–31–9	77
75	April 5	Columbus	0–5	Toronto		Merzlikins	19,179	34–32–9	77
76	April 6	Columbus	0–4	Ottawa		Tarasov	15,616	34–33–9	77
77	April 8	Ottawa	2–5	Columbus		Merzlikins	15,188	35–33–9	79
78	April 10	Buffalo	2–3	Columbus		Greaves	16,406	36–33–9	81
79	April 12	Washington	0–7	Columbus		Greaves	18,645	37–33–9	83
80	April 13	Columbus	4–1	Washington		Greaves	18,573	38–33–9	85
81	April 15	Columbus	3–0	Philadelphia		Greaves	19,105	39–33–9	87
82	April 17	NY Islanders	1–6	Columbus		Greaves	18,874	40–33–9	89

Legend: Win (2 points) Loss (0 points) Overtime/shootout loss (1 point)

== Player statistics ==
=== Skaters ===
Regular season
Player	GP	G	A	Pts	+/−	PIM
Zach Werenski	81	23	59	82	+12	31
Kirill Marchenko	79	31	43	74	+29	20
Kent Johnson	68	24	33	57	+2	16
Sean Monahan	54	19	38	57	+19	20
Adam Fantilli	82	31	23	54	+4	18
Dmitri Voronkov	73	23	24	47	+17	55
James van Riemsdyk	71	16	20	36	−4	23
Cole Sillinger	66	11	22	33	−11	35
Ivan Provorov	82	7	26	33	+11	31
Mathieu Olivier	82	18	14	32	–4	139
Dante Fabbro^{†}	62	9	17	26	+23	40
Damon Severson	70	6	19	25	+5	47
Justin Danforth	61	9	12	21	–6	18
Boone Jenner	26	7	12	19	+3	4
Sean Kuraly	82	6	11	17	−4	40
Zach Aston-Reese	79	6	11	17	−15	27
Egor Chinakhov	30	7	8	15	−6	4
Denton Mateychuk	45	4	9	13	+4	20
Kevin Labanc	34	2	10	12	+1	12
Luca Del Bel Belluz	15	2	6	8	+2	0
Jake Christiansen	68	1	7	8	+6	11
Mikael Pyyhtia	47	4	3	7	–11	6
Jack Johnson	41	0	6	6	−13	2
Jordan Harris	33	1	4	5	−1	6
Erik Gudbranson	16	0	4	4	+1	6
Joseph LaBate	6	0	1	1	+1	10
David Jiricek^{‡}	6	0	1	1	–2	4
Christian Fischer^{†}	1	0	0	0	−1	0
Luke Kunin^{†}	12	0	0	0	−4	9
James Malatesta	2	0	0	0	−1	0
Owen Sillinger	1	0	0	0	0	2
Jack Williams	1	0	0	0	+1	0

=== Goaltenders ===
Regular season
Player	GP	GS	TOI	W	L	OT	GA	GAA	SA	SV%	SO	G	A	PIM
Elvis Merzlikins	53	52	3,170:55	26	21	5	168	3.18	1,557	.892	1	0	1	8
Jet Greaves	11	11	660:06	7	2	2	21	1.91	339	.938	2	0	0	0
Daniil Tarasov	20	19	1,100:25	7	10	2	65	3.54	544	.881	1	0	1	0

^{†}Denotes player spent time with another team before joining the Blue Jackets. Stats reflect time with the Blue Jackets only.
^{‡}Denotes player was traded mid-season. Stats reflect time with the Blue Jackets only.
Bold/italics denotes franchise record.

== Transactions ==
The Blue Jackets have been involved in the following transactions during the 2024–25 season.

=== Key ===
† Contract is entry-level.
‡ Contract initially takes effect in the 2025–26 season.

=== Trades ===
Date	Details		Ref
June 28, 2024	To St. Louis Blues Alexandre Texier	To Columbus Blue Jackets 4th-round pick in 2025	
June 29, 2024	To Carolina Hurricanes 3rd-round pick in 2024; 5th-round pick in 2024	To Columbus Blue Jackets 2nd-round pick in 2024	
August 19, 2024	To Montreal Canadiens Patrik Laine; 2nd-round pick in 2026	To Columbus Blue Jackets Jordan Harris	
November 30, 2024	To Minnesota Wild David Jiricek; 5th-round pick in 2025	To Columbus Blue Jackets Daemon Hunt conditional 1st-round pick in 2025 or 1st-round pick in 2026^{1} COL 3rd-round pick in 2026; TOR 4th-round pick in 2026; 2nd-round pick in 2027	
March 7, 2025	To San Jose Sharks STL 4th-round pick in 2025	To Columbus Blue Jackets Luke Kunin	

Notes

- This pick is top-five protected. Columbus will receive a first-round pick in 2025 if Minnesota's first-round pick is outside the top five. If Minnesota's first-round pick is inside the top-five then Columbus will receive a first-round pick in 2026.

=== Players acquired ===
Date	Player	Former team	Term	Via	Ref
July 1, 2024	Cole Clayton	Cleveland Monsters (AHL)	1-year†	Free agency	
July 1, 2024	Sean Monahan	Winnipeg Jets	5-year	Free agency	
July 1, 2024	Owen Sillinger	Cleveland Monsters (AHL)	1-year	Free agency	
July 2, 2024	Dylan Gambrell	Toronto Maple Leafs	1-year	Free agency	
July 2, 2024	Jack Johnson	Colorado Avalanche	1-year	Free agency	
July 7, 2024	Zach Sawchenko	Vancouver Canucks	1-year	Free agency	
September 15, 2024	James van Riemsdyk	Boston Bruins	1-year	Free agency	
October 5, 2024	Kevin Labanc	San Jose Sharks	1-year	Free agency	
October 7, 2024	Zach Aston-Reese	Vegas Golden Knights		Waivers	

=== Players lost ===
Date	Player	New team	Term	Via	Ref
July 1, 2024	Jake Bean	Calgary Flames	2-year	Free agency	
July 1, 2024	Nick Blankenburg	Nashville Predators	2-year	Free agency	
July 1, 2024	Adam Boqvist			Buyout	
July 1, 2024	Josh Dunne	Buffalo Sabres	2-year	Free agency	
July 1, 2024	Brendan Gaunce	Minnesota Wild	2-year	Free agency	
July 1, 2024	Billy Sweezey	Boston Bruins	2-year	Free agency	
July 3, 2024	Carson Meyer	Anaheim Ducks	1-year	Free agency	
July 9, 2024	Adam Boqvist	Florida Panthers	1-year	Free agency	
July 28, 2024	Alexander Nylander	Toronto Marlies (AHL)	1-year	Free agency	
August 23, 2024	Tyler Angle	Dusseldorfer EG (DEL)	1-year	Free agency	
August 29, 2024	Johnny Gaudreau			Killed by drunk driver	
October 20, 2024	Jakub Zboril	HC Dynamo Pardubice (ELH)	5-year	Free agency	
October 28, 2024	Malcolm Subban	Belleville Senators (AHL)	1-year	Free agency	
November 30, 2024	Marcus Bjork	Oulun Karpat (Liiga)	1-year	Free agency	

=== Signings ===
Date	Player	Term	Ref
July 10, 2024	Jake Christiansen	1-year	
July 13, 2024	Jet Greaves	2-year	
July 27, 2024	Kent Johnson	3-year‡	
July 28, 2024	Kirill Marchenko	3-year	
August 21, 2024	Cole Sillinger	2-year	

== Draft picks ==
Below are the Columbus Blue Jackets' selections at the 2024 NHL entry draft, which was held on June 28 to 29, 2024, at Sphere in Paradise, Nevada.

Round	#	Player	Pos.	Nationality	Team (League)
1	4	Cayden Lindstrom	C	Canada	Medicine Hat Tigers (WHL)
2	36	Charlie Elick	D	Canada	Brandon Wheat Kings (WHL)
3	60	Evan Gardner	G	Canada	Saskatoon Blades (WHL)
3	86	Luca Marrelli	D	Canada	Oshawa Generals (OHL)
4	101	Tanner Henricks	D	United States	Lincoln Stars (USHL)
6	165	Luke Ashton	D	Canada	Langley Rivermen (BCHL)
