= 2024–25 Buffalo Sabres season =

National Hockey League season

2024–25 Buffalo Sabres
- Division: 7th Atlantic
- Conference: 14th Eastern
- 2024–25 record: 36–39–7
- Home record: 23–15–3
- Road record: 13–24–4
- Goals for: 269
- Goals against: 289

Team information
- General manager: Kevyn Adams
- Coach: Lindy Ruff
- Captain: Rasmus Dahlin
- Alternate captains: Dylan Cozens (Oct. 4 – Mar. 7); Mattias Samuelsson; Tage Thompson; Alex Tuch
- Arena: KeyBank Center
- Average attendance: 15,998
- Minor league affiliates: Rochester Americans (AHL); Jacksonville Icemen (ECHL)

Team leaders
- Goals: Tage Thompson (44)
- Assists: Rasmus Dahlin (51)
- Points: Tage Thompson (72)
- Penalty minutes: Dylan Cozens (62)
- Plus/minus: Alex Tuch (+16)
- Wins: Ukko-Pekka Luukkonen (24)
- Goals against average: James Reimer (2.90)

The 2024–25 Buffalo Sabres season was the 55th season of play for the Sabres in the National Hockey League (NHL). It was the team's first season with Lindy Ruff back as head coach since 2013.

The Sabres suffered a 13-game winless streak in late November and early December that dropped them to last place in the Eastern Conference for much of the season. Despite this, the Sabres gained a hot streak towards the end of March and early April that kept their faint playoff hopes alive in a tight conference, but it was ultimately in vain as they were finally eliminated on April 8, 2025, when the Montreal Canadiens beat the Detroit Red Wings. As a result, Buffalo missed the postseason for the 14th consecutive season, continuing the longest playoff drought in NHL history.

== Standings ==
=== Divisional standings ===
Atlantic Division
Pos	Team	GP	W	L	OTL	RW	GF	GA	GD	Pts
1	y – Toronto Maple Leafs	82	52	26	4	41	268	231	+37	108
2	x – Tampa Bay Lightning	82	47	27	8	41	294	219	+75	102
3	x – Florida Panthers	82	47	31	4	37	252	223	+29	98
4	x – Ottawa Senators	82	45	30	7	35	243	234	+9	97
5	x – Montreal Canadiens	82	40	31	11	30	245	265	−20	91
6	Detroit Red Wings	82	39	35	8	30	238	259	−21	86
7	Buffalo Sabres	82	36	39	7	29	269	289	−20	79
8	Boston Bruins	82	33	39	10	26	222	272	−50	76

Source: National Hockey League
Rules for classification: 1) Fewer number of games played (GP, only during regular season); 2) Greater number of regulation wins (RW); 3) Greater number of wins in regulation and overtime, excluding shootout wins (ROW); 4) Greater number of total wins, including shootouts (W); 5) Greater number of points earned in head-to-head play; if teams played an uneven number of head-to-head games, the result of the first game on the home ice of the team with the extra home game is discarded; 6) Greater goal differential (GD); 7) Greater number of goals scored (GF)
x – Clinched playoff spot; y – Clinched division

=== Conference standings ===
Eastern Conference Wild Card
Pos	Div	Team	GP	W	L	OTL	RW	GF	GA	GD	Pts
1	AT	x – Ottawa Senators	82	45	30	7	35	243	234	+9	97
2	AT	x – Montreal Canadiens	82	40	31	11	30	245	265	−20	91
3	ME	Columbus Blue Jackets	82	40	33	9	30	273	268	+5	89
4	AT	Detroit Red Wings	82	39	35	8	30	238	259	−21	86
5	ME	New York Rangers	82	39	36	7	35	256	255	+1	85
6	ME	New York Islanders	82	35	35	12	28	224	260	−36	82
7	ME	Pittsburgh Penguins	82	34	36	12	24	243	293	−50	80
8	AT	Buffalo Sabres	82	36	39	7	29	269	289	−20	79
9	AT	Boston Bruins	82	33	39	10	26	222	272	−50	76
10	ME	Philadelphia Flyers	82	33	39	10	21	238	286	−48	76

Source: National Hockey League
Rules for classification: 1) Fewer number of games played (GP, only during regular season); 2) Greater number of regulation wins (RW); 3) Greater number of wins in regulation and overtime, excluding shootout wins (ROW); 4) Greater number of total wins, including shootouts (W); 5) Greater number of points earned in head-to-head play; if teams played an uneven number of head-to-head games, the result of the first game on the home ice of the team with the extra home game is discarded; 6) Greater goal differential (GD); 7) Greater number of goals scored (GF)
x – Clinched playoff spot

== Schedule and results ==
=== Preseason ===
The preseason schedule was published on June 24, 2024.

2024 preseason game log: 6–1–0 (Home: 3–0–0; Road: 3–1–0)
#	Date	Visitor	Score	Home	OT	Decision	Attendance	Record	Recap
1	September 21	Pittsburgh	3–7	Buffalo		Luukkonen (1–0–0)	12,013	1–0–0
2	September 23	Columbus	1–6	Buffalo		Levi(1–0–0)	9,924	2–0–0
3	September 24	Buffalo	3–2	Pittsburgh		Houser (1–0–0)	11,588	3–0–0
4	September 26	Buffalo	3–2	Ottawa	OT	Sandstrom (1–0–0)	13,411	4–0–0
5^{[a]}	September 27	Buffalo	5–0	EHC Red Bull München		Luukkonen (2–0–0)	10,796	5–0–0
6	September 28	Buffalo	3–6	Columbus		Sandstrom (1–1–0)	12,305	5–1–0
7	September 30	Detroit	3–4	Buffalo	OT	Sandstrom (2–1–0)	11,245	6–1–0
Notes:^{a} Game played at SAP Garden in Munich, Germany

=== Regular season ===
The regular season schedule was published on July 2, 2024.

2024–25 game log

October: 4–5–1 (Home: 3–3–0; Road: 1–2–1)
#	Date	Visitor	Score	Home	OT	Decision	Team Logo	Attendance	Record	Pts	Recap
1^{[A]}	October 4	New Jersey	4–1	Buffalo		Luukkonen (0–1–0)	Main	16,913	0–1–0	0
2^{[A]}	October 5	Buffalo	1–3	New Jersey		Levi (0–1–0)	Main	16,722	0–2–0	0
3	October 10	Los Angeles	3–1	Buffalo		Luukkonen (0–2–0)	Main	19,070	0–3–0	0
4	October 12	Florida	2–5	Buffalo		Levi (1–1–0)	Main	16,644	1–3–0	2
5	October 16	Buffalo	5–6	Pittsburgh	OT	Luukkonen (0–2–1)	Main	15,644	1–3–1	3
6	October 17	Buffalo	4–6	Columbus		Levi (1–2–0)	Main	16,126	1–4–1	3
7	October 19	Buffalo	4–2	Chicago		Luukkonen (1–2–1)	Main	18,773	2–4–1	5
8	October 22	Dallas	2–4	Buffalo		Luukkonen (2–2–1)	Main	13,014	3–4–1	7
9	October 26	Detroit	3–5	Buffalo		Luukkonen (3–2–1)	Alt	15,017	4–4–1	9
10	October 28	Florida	5–2	Buffalo		Luukkonen (3–3–1)	Main	12,906	4–5–1	9

November: 7–6–1 (Home: 3–3–1; Road: 4–3–0)
#	Date	Visitor	Score	Home	OT	Decision	Team Logo	Attendance	Record	Pts	Recap
11	November 1	NY Islanders	4–3	Buffalo		Levi (1–3–0)	Alt	17,074	4–6–1	9
12	November 2	Buffalo	1–2	Detroit		Luukkonen (3–4–1)	Main	19,515	4–7–1	9
13	November 5	Ottawa	1–5	Buffalo		Luukkonen (4–4–1)	Main	12,260	5–7–1	11
14	November 7	Buffalo	6–1	NY Rangers		Luukkonen (5–4–1)	Main	18,006	6–7–1	13
15	November 9	Calgary	2–3	Buffalo	SO	Luukkonen (6–4–1)	Main	16,442	7–7–1	15
16	November 11	Montreal	7–5	Buffalo		Levi (1–4–0)	Main	15,687	7–8–1	15
17	November 14	St. Louis	3–4	Buffalo	OT	Levi (2–4–0)	Main	13,943	8–8–1	17
18	November 16	Buffalo	2–5	Philadelphia		Levi (2–5–0)	Main	18,793	8–9–1	17
19	November 20	Buffalo	1–0	Los Angeles		Luukkonen (7–4–1)	Main	16,778	9–9–1	19
20	November 22	Buffalo	3–2	Anaheim		Luukkonen (8–4–1)	Main	13,776	10–9–1	21
21	November 23	Buffalo	4–2	San Jose		Reimer (1–0–0)	Main	17,435	11–9–1	23
22	November 27	Minnesota	1–0	Buffalo		Luukkonen (8–5–1)	Main	17,326	11–10–1	23
23	November 29	Vancouver	4–3	Buffalo	OT	Luukkonen (8–4–2)	Alt	18,059	11–10–2	24
24	November 30	Buffalo	0–3	NY Islanders		Reimer (1–1–0)	Main	16,299	11–11–2	24

December: 3–9–2 (Home: 1–4–2; Road: 2–5–0)
#	Date	Visitor	Score	Home	OT	Decision	Team Logo	Attendance	Record	Pts	Recap
25	December 3	Colorado	5–4	Buffalo		Luukkonen (8–5–2)	Main	14,942	11–12–2	24
26	December 5	Winnipeg	3–2	Buffalo	OT	Luukkonen (8–5–3)	Main	14,497	11–12–3	25
27	December 7	Utah	5–2	Buffalo		Luukkonen (8–6–3)	Main	15,071	11–13–3	25
28	December 9	Detroit	6–5	Buffalo	SO	Reimer (1–1–1)	Main	14,559	11–13–4	26
29	December 11	NY Rangers	3–2	Buffalo		Luukkonen (8–7–3)	Main	15,815	11–14–4	26
30	December 14	Buffalo	2–4	Washington		Luukkonen (8–8–3)	Main	18,573	11–15–4	26
31	December 15	Buffalo	3–5	Toronto		Levi (2–6–0)	Main	18,588	11–16–4	26
32	December 17	Buffalo	1–6	Montreal		Luukkonen (8–9–3)	Main	21,105	11–17–4	26
33	December 20	Toronto	6–3	Buffalo		Luukkonen (8–10–3)	Alt	18,267	11–18–4	26
34	December 21	Buffalo	1–3	Boston		Luukkonen (8–11–3)	Main	17,850	11–19–4	26
35	December 23	Buffalo	7–1	NY Islanders		Luukkonen (9–11–3)	Main	17,255	12–19–4	28
36	December 27	Chicago	2–6	Buffalo		Luukkonen (10–11–3)	Alt	19,070	13–19–4	30
37	December 29	Buffalo	4–2	St. Louis		Luukkonen (11–11–3)	Main	18,096	14–19–4	32
38	December 31	Buffalo	2–4	Dallas		Luukkonen (11–12–3)	Main	18,532	14–20–4	32

January: 6–6–1 (Home: 4–2–0; Road: 2–4–1)
#	Date	Visitor	Score	Home	OT	Decision	Team Logo	Attendance	Record	Pts	Recap
39	January 2	Buffalo	5–6	Colorado	OT	Luukkonen (11–12–4)	Main	18,081	14–20–5	33
40	January 4	Buffalo	1–3	Vegas		Reimer (1–2–1)	Main	18,111	14–21–5	33
41	January 6	Washington	3–4	Buffalo	SO	Luukkonen (12–12–4)	Main	15,548	15–21–5	35
42	January 9	Buffalo	4–0	Ottawa		Luukkonen (13–12–4)	Main	16,276	16–21–5	37
43	January 11	Seattle	6–2	Buffalo		Luukkonen (13–13–4)	Main	16,759	16–22–5	37
44	January 15	Carolina	2–4	Buffalo		Luukkonen (14–13–4)	Main	13,449	17–22–5	39
45	January 17	Pittsburgh	5–2	Buffalo		Luukkonen (14–14–4)	Main	19,070	17–23–5	39
46	January 20	Buffalo	4–6	Seattle		Levi (2–7–0)	Main	17,151	17–24–5	39
47	January 21	Buffalo	3–2	Vancouver		Luukkonen (15–14–4)	Main	19,064	18–24–5	41
48	January 23	Buffalo	2–5	Calgary		Luukkonen (15–15–4)	Main	17,585	18–25–5	41
49	January 25	Buffalo	2–3	Edmonton		Reimer (1–3–1)	Main	18,347	18–26–5	41
50	January 28	Boston	2–7	Buffalo		Luukkonen (16–15–4)	Main	15,607	19–26–5	43
51	January 31	Nashville	3–4	Buffalo		Luukkonen (17–15–4)	Alt	18,347	20–26–5	45

February: 4–2–0 (Home: 4–0–0; Road: 0–2–0)
#	Date	Visitor	Score	Home	OT	Decision	Team Logo	Attendance	Record	Pts	Recap
52	February 2	New Jersey	3–4	Buffalo		Luukkonen (18–15–4)	Main	15,710	21–26–5	47
53	February 4	Columbus	2–3	Buffalo		Reimer (2–3–1)	Main	14,198	22–26–5	49
54	February 8	Buffalo	4–6	Nashville		Luukkonen (18–16–4)	Main	17,159	22–27–5	49
55	February 22	NY Rangers	2–8	Buffalo		Luukkonen (19–16–4)	Main	19,070	23–27–5	51
56	February 25	Anaheim	2–3	Buffalo		Luukkonen (20–16–4)	Main	13,921	24–27–5	53
57	February 27	Buffalo	2–5	Carolina		Reimer (2–4–1)	Main	18,844	24–28–5	53

March: 7–8–1 (Home: 4–2–0; Road: 3–6–1)
#	Date	Visitor	Score	Home	OT	Decision	Team Logo	Attendance	Record	Pts	Recap
58	March 1	Montreal	4–2	Buffalo		Luukkonen (20–17–4)	Alt	18,361	24–29–5	53
59	March 3	Buffalo	3–4	Montreal	OT	Reimer (2–4–2)	Main	21,105	24–29–6	54
60	March 4	San Jose	6–2	Buffalo		Luukkonen (20–18–4)	Main	14,741	24–30–6	54
61	March 6	Buffalo	5–6	Tampa Bay		Luukkonen (20–19–4)	Main	19,092	24–31–6	54
62	March 8	Buffalo	0–4	Florida		Luukkonen (20–20–4)	Main	19,559	24–32–6	54
63	March 10	Edmonton	2–3	Buffalo		Luukkonen (21–20–4)	Alt	18,263	25–32–6	56
64	March 12	Buffalo	3–7	Detroit		Luukkonen (21–21–4)	Alt	18,885	25–33–6	56
65	March 15	Vegas	3–4	Buffalo	SO	Luukkonen (22–21–4)	Alt	16,770	26–33–6	58
66	March 17	Buffalo	3–2	Boston	OT	Luukkonen (23–21–4)	Main	17,850	27–33–6	60
67	March 20	Buffalo	2–5	Utah		Reimer (2–5–2)	Main	11,131	27–34–6	60
68	March 22	Buffalo	1–4	Minnesota		Luukkonen (24–22–4)	Main	18,379	27–35–6	60
69	March 23	Buffalo	5–3	Winnipeg		Reimer (3–5–2)	Alt	15,225	28–35–6	62
70	March 25	Ottawa	2–3	Buffalo		Reimer (4–5–2)	Main	13,955	29–35–6	64
71	March 27	Pittsburgh	3–7	Buffalo		Reimer (5–5–2)	Main	16,418	30–35–6	66
72	March 29	Buffalo	4–7	Philadelphia		Luukkonen (24–23–4)	Main	19,092	30–36–6	66
73	March 30	Buffalo	8–5	Washington		Reimer (6–5–2)	Main	18,573	31–36–6	68

April: 5–3–1 (Home: 4–1–0; Road: 1–2–1)
#	Date	Visitor	Score	Home	OT	Decision	Team Logo	Attendance	Record	Pts	Recap
74	April 1	Buffalo	5–2	Ottawa		Reimer (7–5–2)	Main	16,446	32–36–6	70
75	April 5	Tampa Bay	2–3	Buffalo	SO	Reimer (8–5–2)	Alt	15,982	33–36–6	72
76	April 6	Boston	3–6	Buffalo		Luukkonen (25–23–4)	Main	15,653	34–36–6	74
77	April 8	Carolina	0–3	Buffalo		Reimer (9–5–2)	Alt	13,709	35–36–6	76
78	April 10	Buffalo	2–3	Columbus		Reimer (9–6–2)	Main	16,406	35–37–6	76
79	April 12	Buffalo	2–3	Florida	SO	Luukkonen (25–23–5)	Main	19,318	35–37–7	77
80	April 13	Buffalo	4–7	Tampa Bay		Reimer (9–7–2)	Main	19,092	35–38–7	77
81	April 15	Toronto	4–0	Buffalo		Luukkonen (25–24–5)	Main	17,160	35–39–7	77
82	April 17	Philadelphia	4–5	Buffalo		Reimer (10–7–2)	Alt	16,633	36–39–7	79

Legend: Win (2 points) Loss (0 points) Overtime/shootout loss (1 point)
Notes:
^{A} Game played at O2 Arena in Prague, Czech Republic

== Player statistics ==
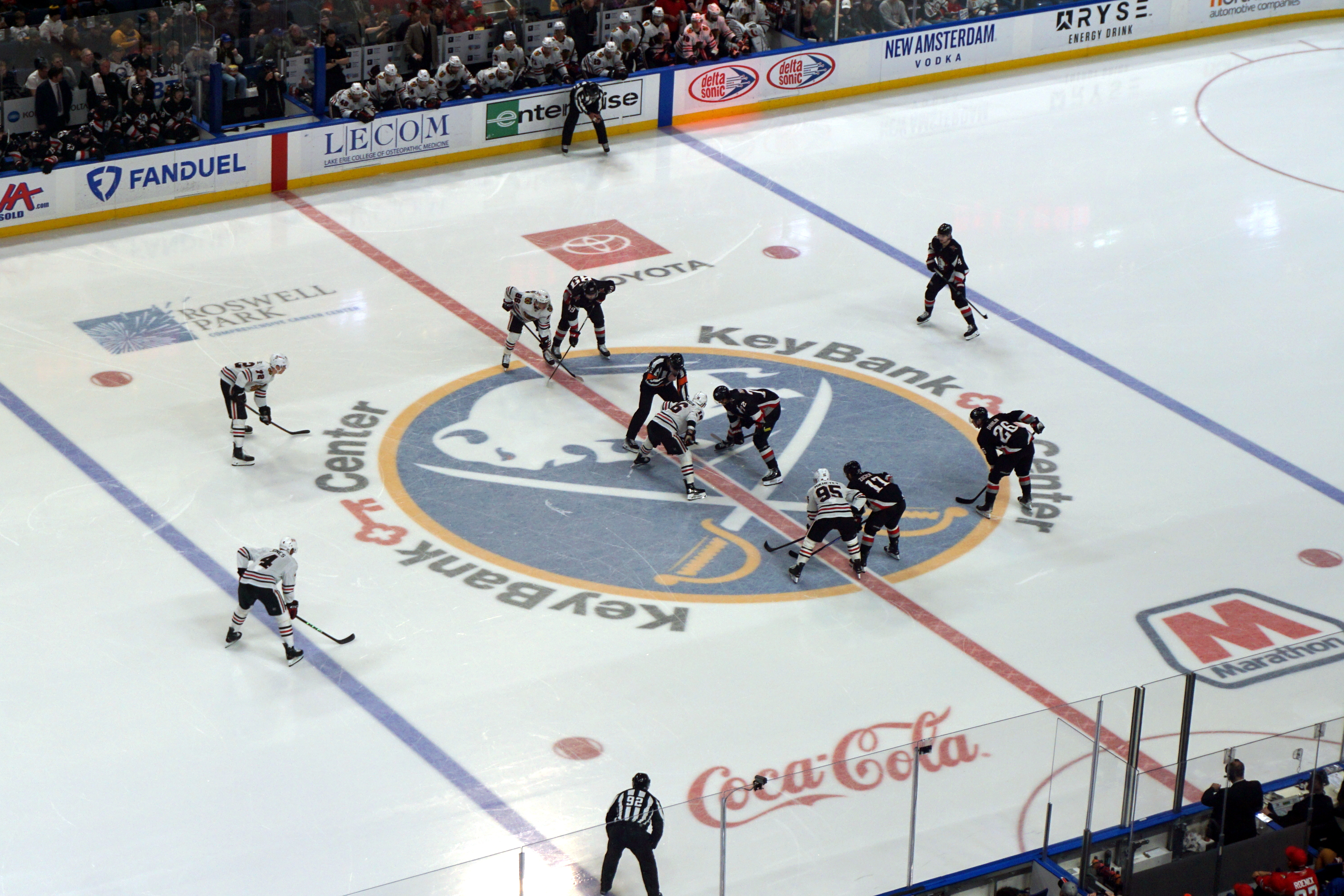
The Sabres hosting Chicago in Dec. 2024

=== Skaters ===
Regular season
Player	GP	G	A	Pts	+/−	PIM
Tage Thompson	76	44	28	72	−2	35
JJ Peterka	77	27	41	68	−1	34
Rasmus Dahlin	73	17	51	68	+11	54
Alex Tuch	82	36	31	67	+16	47
Jason Zucker	73	21	32	53	+4	57
Ryan McLeod	79	20	33	53	+13	16
Owen Power	79	7	33	40	−13	16
Jack Quinn	74	15	24	39	−18	18
Bowen Byram	82	7	31	38	+11	46
Dylan Cozens^{‡}	61	11	20	31	−13	62
Zach Benson	75	10	18	28	+1	60
Peyton Krebs	81	10	18	28	−2	60
Jiri Kulich	62	15	9	24	−4	18
Connor Clifton	73	1	15	16	−6	45
Mattias Samuelsson	62	4	10	14	+3	22
Beck Malenstyn	76	4	6	10	−16	29
Jordan Greenway	34	3	5	8	−4	45
Sam Lafferty	60	4	3	7	−15	28
Jacob Bryson	48	0	7	7	−9	10
Henri Jokiharju^{‡}	42	3	3	6	+6	12
Tyson Kozak	21	3	2	5	−2	2
Dennis Gilbert^{‡}	25	0	5	5	−3	50
Jacob Bernard-Docker^{†}	15	1	3	4	+3	13
Josh Norris^{†}	3	1	1	2	−1	10
Nicolas Aube-Kubel^{‡}	19	1	1	2	−4	17
Isak Rosen	8	0	1	1	−3	0
Josh Dunne	2	0	0	0	−3	5
Ryan Johnson	3	0	0	0	−2	4
Brett Murray	3	0	0	0	−2	0
Noah Ostlund	8	0	0	0	−6	2

=== Goaltenders ===
Regular season
Player	GP	GS	TOI	W	L	OT	GA	GAA	SA	SV%	SO	G	A	PIM
Ukko-Pekka Luukkonen	55	55	3,172:13	24	24	5	169	3.20	1,490	.887	2	0	1	2
James Reimer^{†}	22	19	1,242:50	10	8	2	60	2.90	596	.901	1	0	0	0
Devon Levi	9	8	480:38	2	7	0	33	4.12	258	.872	0	0	0	0

^{†}Denotes player spent time with another team before joining the Sabres. Stats reflect time with the Sabres only.
^{‡}Denotes player was traded mid-season. Stats reflect time with the Sabres only.
Bold/italics denotes franchise record.

== Transactions ==
The Sabres have been involved in the following transactions during the 2024–25 season.

Key: † Contract is entry-level.
‡ Contract initially takes effect in the 2025–26 season.

=== Trades ===
Date	Details		Ref
June 29, 2024	To Washington Capitals 2nd-round pick in 2024	To Buffalo Sabres Beck Malenstyn	
July 5, 2024	To Edmonton Oilers Matthew Savoie	To Buffalo Sabres Ryan McLeod; Tyler Tullio	
January 3, 2025	To Pittsburgh Penguins Colton Poolman	To Buffalo Sabres Bennett MacArthur	
March 7, 2025	To Boston Bruins Henri Jokiharju	To Buffalo Sabres EDM 4th-round pick in 2026	
March 7, 2025	To New York Rangers Nicolas Aube-Kubel	To Buffalo Sabres Erik Brannstrom	
March 7, 2025	To Ottawa Senators Dylan Cozens; Dennis Gilbert; 2nd-round pick in 2026	To Buffalo Sabres Jacob Bernard-Docker; Josh Norris	
June 26, 2025	To Utah Hockey Club JJ Peterka	To Buffalo Sabres Josh Doan; Michael Kesselring	

=== Players acquired ===
Date	Player	Former team	Term	Via	Ref
July 1, 2024	Nicolas Aube-Kubel	Washington Capitals	1-year	Free agency	
July 1, 2024	Josh Dunne	Columbus Blue Jackets	2-year	Free agency	
July 1, 2024	Dennis Gilbert	Calgary Flames	1-year	Free agency	
July 1, 2024	Sam Lafferty	Vancouver Canucks	2-year	Free agency	
July 1, 2024	Jack Rathbone	Pittsburgh Penguins	1-year	Free agency	
July 1, 2024	Felix Sandstrom	Philadelphia Flyers	1-year	Free agency	
July 1, 2024	Jason Zucker	Nashville Predators	1-year	Free agency	
July 2, 2024	Colton Poolman	Calgary Flames	1-year	Free agency	
July 2, 2024	James Reimer	Detroit Red Wings	1-year	Free agency	
November 13, 2024	James Reimer	Anaheim Ducks		Waivers	

=== Players lost ===
Date	Player	New team	Term	Via	Ref
June 30, 2024	Jeff Skinner	Edmonton Oilers	1-year	Buyout	
July 1, 2024	Brandon Biro	Seattle Kraken	1-year	Free agency	
July 1, 2024	Joseph Cecconi	Minnesota Wild	1-year	Free agency	
July 1, 2024	Eric Comrie	Winnipeg Jets	2-year	Free agency	
July 1, 2024	Jeremy Davies	Ottawa Senators	1-year	Free agency	
July 1, 2024	Zemgus Girgensons	Tampa Bay Lightning	3-year	Free agency	
July 1, 2024	Tyson Jost	Carolina Hurricanes	1-year	Free agency	
July 1, 2024	Eric Robinson	Carolina Hurricanes	1-year	Free agency	
July 2, 2024	Victor Olofsson	Vegas Golden Knights	1-year	Free agency	
July 3, 2024	Riley Stillman	Carolina Hurricanes	1-year	Free agency	
October 7, 2024	James Reimer	Anaheim Ducks		Waivers	

=== Signings ===
Date	Player	Term	Ref
June 28, 2024	Kale Clague	1-year	
July 1, 2024	Jacob Bryson	1-year	
July 1, 2024	Mason Jobst	1-year	
July 1, 2024	Brett Murray	1-year	
July 5, 2024	Henri Jokiharju	1-year	
July 8, 2024	Konsta Helenius	3-year†	
July 23, 2024	Beck Malenstyn	2-year	
July 24, 2024	Ukko-Pekka Luukkonen	5-year	
September 17, 2024	Peyton Krebs	2-year	
October 19, 2024	Scott Ratzlaff	3-year†	
March 5, 2025	Jordan Greenway	2-year	

== Draft picks ==
Below are the Buffalo Sabres selections at the 2024 NHL entry draft, which was held on June 28 and 29, 2024, at Sphere in Paradise, Nevada.

Round	#	Player	Pos	Nationality	College/Junior/Club team (League)
1	14	Konsta Helenius	C	Finland	Mikkelin Jukurit (Liiga)
2	42	Adam Kleber	D	United States	Lincoln Stars (USHL)
3	71	Brodie Ziemer	RW	United States	U.S. NTDP (USHL)
4	108	Luke Osburn	D	United States	Youngstown Phantoms (USHL)
4	123	Simon-Pier Brunet	D	Canada	Drummondville Voltigeurs (QMJHL)
6	172	Patrick Geary	D	United States	Michigan State Spartans (Big Ten)
7	204	Vasili Zelenov	RW	Russia	Red Bull Hockey Juniors (AlpsHL)
7	219	Ryerson Leenders	G	Canada	Mississauga Steelheads (OHL)
