= 2024–25 Boston Bruins season =

National Hockey League season

2024–25 Boston Bruins
- Division: 8th Atlantic
- Conference: 15th Eastern
- 2024–25 record: 33–39–10
- Home record: 20–14–7
- Road record: 13–25–3
- Goals for: 222
- Goals against: 272

Team information
- General manager: Don Sweeney
- Coach: Jim Montgomery (Oct. 8 – Nov. 19); Joe Sacco (interim, Nov. 19 – Apr. 15)
- Captain: Brad Marchand (Oct. 8 – Mar. 7); Vacant (Mar. 7 – Apr 15.)
- Alternate captains: Charlie McAvoy; David Pastrnak; Rotating (Mar. 7 – Apr 15.)
- Arena: TD Garden
- Average attendance: 17,852
- Minor league affiliates: Providence Bruins (AHL); Maine Mariners (ECHL)

Team leaders
- Goals: David Pastrnak (43)
- Assists: David Pastrnak (63)
- Points: David Pastrnak (106)
- Penalty minutes: Nikita Zadorov (145)
- Plus/minus: Nikita Zadorov (+25)
- Wins: Jeremy Swayman (22)
- Goals against average: Joonas Korpisalo (2.90)

The 2024–25 Boston Bruins season was the 101st season (100th season of play) for the National Hockey League (NHL) franchise that was established on November 1, 1924.

On April 5, 2025, the Bruins, despite a 5–1 victory against the Carolina Hurricanes, were eliminated from playoff contention, missing the playoffs for the first time since their 2015–16 season following their rival Montreal Canadiens' victory over the Philadelphia Flyers. This was the first time since the 2006–07 season that the Bruins finished with a losing record and this snaps a streak of 17 winning seasons starting from 2007–08 season to 2023–24 season for the first time since 1996–97, they finished second-last in the Eastern Conference, avoiding the last place due to regulation wins tiebreaker with the Philadelphia Flyers. Despite a decent start to the season with a 20–14–4 record, the Bruins fell apart, suffering a 13–25–6 record the rest of the season.

== Standings ==
=== Divisional standings ===
Atlantic Division
Pos	Team	GP	W	L	OTL	RW	GF	GA	GD	Pts
1	y – Toronto Maple Leafs	82	52	26	4	41	268	231	+37	108
2	x – Tampa Bay Lightning	82	47	27	8	41	294	219	+75	102
3	x – Florida Panthers	82	47	31	4	37	252	223	+29	98
4	x – Ottawa Senators	82	45	30	7	35	243	234	+9	97
5	x – Montreal Canadiens	82	40	31	11	30	245	265	−20	91
6	Detroit Red Wings	82	39	35	8	30	238	259	−21	86
7	Buffalo Sabres	82	36	39	7	29	269	289	−20	79
8	Boston Bruins	82	33	39	10	26	222	272	−50	76

Source: National Hockey League
Rules for classification: 1) Fewer number of games played (GP, only during regular season); 2) Greater number of regulation wins (RW); 3) Greater number of wins in regulation and overtime, excluding shootout wins (ROW); 4) Greater number of total wins, including shootouts (W); 5) Greater number of points earned in head-to-head play; if teams played an uneven number of head-to-head games, the result of the first game on the home ice of the team with the extra home game is discarded; 6) Greater goal differential (GD); 7) Greater number of goals scored (GF)
x – Clinched playoff spot; y – Clinched division

=== Conference standings ===
Eastern Conference Wild Card
Pos	Div	Team	GP	W	L	OTL	RW	GF	GA	GD	Pts
1	AT	x – Ottawa Senators	82	45	30	7	35	243	234	+9	97
2	AT	x – Montreal Canadiens	82	40	31	11	30	245	265	−20	91
3	ME	Columbus Blue Jackets	82	40	33	9	30	273	268	+5	89
4	AT	Detroit Red Wings	82	39	35	8	30	238	259	−21	86
5	ME	New York Rangers	82	39	36	7	35	256	255	+1	85
6	ME	New York Islanders	82	35	35	12	28	224	260	−36	82
7	ME	Pittsburgh Penguins	82	34	36	12	24	243	293	−50	80
8	AT	Buffalo Sabres	82	36	39	7	29	269	289	−20	79
9	AT	Boston Bruins	82	33	39	10	26	222	272	−50	76
10	ME	Philadelphia Flyers	82	33	39	10	21	238	286	−48	76

Source: National Hockey League
Rules for classification: 1) Fewer number of games played (GP, only during regular season); 2) Greater number of regulation wins (RW); 3) Greater number of wins in regulation and overtime, excluding shootout wins (ROW); 4) Greater number of total wins, including shootouts (W); 5) Greater number of points earned in head-to-head play; if teams played an uneven number of head-to-head games, the result of the first game on the home ice of the team with the extra home game is discarded; 6) Greater goal differential (GD); 7) Greater number of goals scored (GF)
x – Clinched playoff spot

== Schedule and results ==
=== Preseason ===
The Boston Bruins preseason season schedule was released on June 17, 2024.

2024 preseason game log: 2–4–1 (Home: 2–1–0; Road: 0–3–1)
#	Date	Visitor	Score	Home	OT	Decision	Location	Attendance	Record
1	September 22	NY Rangers	3–2	Boston		DiPietro	TD Garden	17,850	0–1–0
2	September 24	Washington	2–4	Boston		Korpisalo	TD Garden	17,850	1–1–0
3	September 26	Boston	2–5	NY Rangers		Bussi	Madison Square Garden	16,205	1–2–0
4	September 28	Boston	2–3	Philadelphia	OT	Korpisalo	Wells Fargo Center	13,863	1–2–1
5	October 1	Philadelphia	1–4	Boston		Bussi	TD Garden	17,850	2–2–1
6	October 3	Boston	1–4	Los Angeles		Korpisalo	Videotron Centre (Quebec City)	17,334	2–3–1
7	October 5	Boston	0–2	Washington		Bussi	Capital One Arena	13,224	2–4–1

=== Regular season ===
The Boston Bruins regular season schedule was released on July 2, 2024.

2024–25 game log

October: 4–6–1 (home: 3–3–0; road: 1–3–1)
#	Date	Visitor	Score	Home	OT	Decision	Location	Attendance	Record	Pts	Recap
1	October 8	Boston	4–6	Florida		Korpisalo	Amerant Bank Arena	19,813	0–1–0	0
2	October 10	Montreal	4–6	Boston		Swayman	TD Garden	17,850	1–1–0	2
3	October 12	Los Angeles	1–2	Boston	OT	Swayman	TD Garden	17,850	2–1–0	4
4	October 14	Florida	4–3	Boston		Swayman	TD Garden	17,850	2–2–0	4
5	October 16	Boston	5–3	Colorado		Korpisalo	Ball Arena	18,024	3–2–0	6
6	October 19	Boston	1–2	Utah	OT	Swayman	Delta Center	11,131	3–2–1	7
7	October 22	Boston	0–4	Nashville		Swayman	Bridgestone Arena	17,184	3–3–1	7
8	October 24	Dallas	5–2	Boston		Swayman	TD Garden	17,850	3–4–1	7
9	October 26	Toronto	3–4	Boston	OT	Swayman	TD Garden	17,850	4–4–1	9
10	October 29	Philadelphia	2–0	Boston		Korpisalo	TD Garden	17,850	4–5–1	9
11	October 31	Boston	2–8	Carolina		Swayman	Lenovo Center	18,700	4–6–1	9

November: 7–5–2 (home: 3–3–2; road: 4–2–0)
#	Date	Visitor	Score	Home	OT	Decision	Location	Attendance	Record	Pts	Recap
12	November 2	Boston	3–0	Philadelphia		Korpisalo	Wells Fargo Center	17,429	5–6–1	11
13	November 3	Seattle	0–2	Boston		Swayman	TD Garden	17,850	6–6–1	13
14	November 5	Boston	0–4	Toronto		Swayman	Scotiabank Arena	18,730	6–7–1	13
15	November 7	Calgary	3–4	Boston	OT	Korpisalo	TD Garden	17,850	7–7–1	15
16	November 9	Ottawa	3–2	Boston	OT	Swayman	TD Garden	17,850	7–7–2	16
17	November 12	Boston	3–2	St. Louis		Swayman	Enterprise Center	18,096	8–7–2	18
18	November 14	Boston	2–7	Dallas		Swayman	American Airlines Center	18,532	8–8–2	18
19	November 16	St. Louis	3–2	Boston	OT	Korpisalo	TD Garden	17,850	8–8–3	19
20	November 18	Columbus	5–1	Boston		Swayman	TD Garden	17,850	8–9–3	19
21	November 21	Utah	0–1	Boston		Korpisalo	TD Garden	17,850	9–9–3	21
22	November 23	Boston	2–1	Detroit		Swayman	Little Caesars Arena	19,515	10–9–3	23
23	November 26	Vancouver	2–0	Boston		Swayman	TD Garden	17,850	10–10–3	23
24	November 27	Boston	6–3	NY Islanders		Korpisalo	UBS Arena	16,145	11–10–3	25
25	November 29	Pittsburgh	2–1	Boston		Swayman	TD Garden	17,850	11–11–3	25

December: 9–4–1 (home: 6–0–0; road: 3–4–1)
#	Date	Visitor	Score	Home	OT	Decision	Location	Attendance	Record	Pts	Recap
26	December 1	Montreal	3–6	Boston		Swayman	TD Garden	17,850	12–11–3	27
27	December 3	Detroit	2–3	Boston	OT	Korpisalo	TD Garden	17,950	13–11–3	29
28	December 4	Boston	4–2	Chicago		Swayman	United Center	19,179	14–11–3	31
29	December 7	Philadelphia	3–4	Boston	OT	Swayman	TD Garden	17,850	15–11–3	33
30	December 10	Boston	1–8	Winnipeg		Swayman	Canada Life Centre	12,921	15–12–3	33
31	December 12	Boston	1–5	Seattle		Korpisalo	Climate Pledge Arena	17,151	15–13–3	33
32	December 14	Boston	5–1	Vancouver		Swayman	Rogers Arena	18,787	16–13–3	35
33	December 17	Boston	4–3	Calgary	OT	Swayman	Scotiabank Saddledome	17,536	17–13–3	37
34	December 19	Boston	2–3	Edmonton	OT	Swayman	Rogers Place	18,347	17–13–4	38
35	December 21	Buffalo	1–3	Boston		Swayman	TD Garden	17,850	18–13–4	40
36	December 23	Washington	1–4	Boston		Swayman	TD Garden	17,850	19–13–4	42
37	December 27	Boston	2–6	Columbus		Swayman	Nationwide Arena	18,821	19–14–4	42
38	December 28	Columbus	0–4	Boston		Swayman	TD Garden	17,850	20–14–4	44
39	December 31	Boston	1–3	Washington		Swayman	Capital One Arena	18,573	20–15–4	44

January: 5–7–2 (home: 4–2–1; road: 1–5–1)
#	Date	Visitor	Score	Home	OT	Decision	Location	Attendance	Record	Pts	Recap
40	January 2	Boston	1–2	NY Rangers		Swayman	Madison Square Garden	18,006	20–16–4	44
41	January 4	Boston	4–6	Toronto		Swayman	Scotiabank Arena	18,996	20–17–4	44
42	January 5	NY Islanders	5–4	Boston	OT	Korpisalo	TD Garden	17,850	20–17–5	45
43	January 7	Edmonton	4–0	Boston		Swayman	TD Garden	17,850	20–18–5	45
44	January 9	Boston	1–4	Tampa Bay		Swayman	Amalie Arena	19,092	20–19–5	45
45	January 11	Boston	4–3	Florida	OT	Swayman	Amerant Bank Arena	19,687	21–19–5	47
46	January 14	Tampa Bay	2–6	Boston		Swayman	TD Garden	17,850	22–19–5	49
47	January 18	Boston	5–6	Ottawa	SO	Swayman	Canadian Tire Centre	18,768	22–19–6	50
48	January 20	San Jose	3–6	Boston		Korpisalo	TD Garden	17,850	23–19–6	52
49	January 22	Boston	1–5	New Jersey		Swayman	Prudential Center	16,025	23–20–6	52
50	January 23	Ottawa	0–2	Boston		Korpisalo	TD Garden	17,850	24–20–6	54
51	January 25	Colorado	1–3	Boston		Swayman	TD Garden	17,850	25–20–6	56
52	January 28	Boston	2–7	Buffalo		Swayman	KeyBank Center	15,607	25–21–6	56
53	January 30	Winnipeg	6–2	Boston		Korpisalo	TD Garden	17,850	25–22–6	56

February: 2–3–2 (home: 2–2–2; road: 0–1–0)
#	Date	Visitor	Score	Home	OT	Decision	Location	Attendance	Record	Pts	Recap
54	February 1	NY Rangers	3–6	Boston		Swayman	TD Garden	17,850	26–22–6	58
55	February 4	Minnesota	0–3	Boston		Swayman	TD Garden	17,850	27–22–6	60
56	February 5	Boston	2–3	NY Rangers		Korpisalo	Madison Square Garden	18,006	27–23–6	60
57	February 8	Vegas	4–3	Boston		Swayman	TD Garden	17,850	27–24–6	60
58	February 22	Anaheim	3–2	Boston	OT	Swayman	TD Garden	17,850	27–24–7	61
59	February 25	Toronto	5–4	Boston	OT	Swayman	TD Garden	17,850	27–24–8	62
60	February 27	NY Islanders	2–1	Boston		Swayman	TD Garden	17,850	27–25–8	62

March: 3–10–1 (home: 1–2–1; road: 2–8–0)
#	Date	Visitor	Score	Home	OT	Decision	Location	Attendance	Record	Pts	Recap
61	March 1	Boston	3–2	Pittsburgh		Korpisalo	PPG Paints Arena	17,320	28–25–8	64
62	March 2	Boston	0–1	Minnesota		Swayman	Xcel Energy Center	18,447	28–26–8	64
63	March 4	Nashville	6–3	Boston		Swayman	TD Garden	17,850	28–27–8	64
64	March 6	Boston	2–3	Carolina		Korpisalo	Lenovo Center	18,700	28–28–8	64
65	March 8	Boston	4–0	Tampa Bay		Swayman	Amalie Arena	19,092	29–28–8	66
66	March 11	Florida	2–3	Boston		Swayman	TD Garden	17,850	30–28–8	68
67	March 13	Boston	3–6	Ottawa		Swayman	Canadian Tire Centre	17,458	30–29–8	68
68	March 15	Tampa Bay	6–2	Boston		Swayman	TD Garden	17,850	30–30–8	68
69	March 17	Buffalo	3–2	Boston	OT	Korpisalo	TD Garden	17,850	30–30–9	69
70	March 20	Boston	1–5	Vegas		Swayman	T-Mobile Arena	18,225	30–31–9	69
71	March 22	Boston	1–3	San Jose		Korpisalo	SAP Center	17,435	30–32–9	69
72	March 23	Boston	2–7	Los Angeles		Swayman	Crypto.com Arena	18,145	30–33–9	69
73	March 26	Boston	2–6	Anaheim		Korpisalo	Honda Center	16,387	30–34–9	69
74	March 29	Boston	1–2	Detroit		Swayman	Little Caesars Arena	19,515	30–35–9	69

April: 3–4–1 (home: 1–2–1; road: 2–2–0)
#	Date	Visitor	Score	Home	OT	Decision	Location	Attendance	Record	Pts	Recap
75	April 1	Washington	4–3	Boston		Swayman	TD Garden	17,850	30–36–9	69
76	April 3	Boston	1–4	Montreal		Swayman	Bell Centre	21,105	30–37–9	69
77	April 5	Carolina	1–5	Boston		Swayman	TD Garden	17,850	31–37–9	71
78	April 6	Boston	3–6	Buffalo		Korpisalo	KeyBank Center	15,653	31–38–9	71
79	April 8	Boston	7–2	New Jersey		Swayman	Prudential Center	15,507	32–38–9	73
80	April 10	Chicago	5–2	Boston		Swayman	TD Garden	17,850	32–39–9	73
81	April 13	Boston	4–1	Pittsburgh		Korpisalo	PPG Paints Arena	15,976	33–39–9	75
82	April 15	New Jersey	5–4	Boston	OT	Swayman	TD Garden	17,850	33–39–10	76

Legend: Win (2 points) Loss (0 points) Overtime/shootout loss (1 point)

== Player statistics ==
=== Skaters ===
Regular season
Player	GP	G	A	Pts	+/−	PIM
David Pastrnak	82	43	63	106	0	42
Morgan Geekie	77	33	24	57	+3	22
Brad Marchand^{‡}	61	21	26	47	−8	62
Elias Lindholm	82	17	30	47	−4	14
Pavel Zacha	82	14	33	47	−8	21
Mason Lohrei	77	5	28	33	−43	16
Charlie McAvoy	50	7	16	23	0	46
Charlie Coyle^{‡}	64	15	7	22	−14	18
Nikita Zadorov	81	4	18	22	+25	145
Justin Brazeau^{‡}	57	10	10	20	−6	16
Cole Koepke	73	10	7	17	+1	17
Andrew Peeke	76	1	16	17	−10	15
Trent Frederic^{‡}	57	8	7	15	−14	44
Mark Kastelic	61	5	9	14	−3	106
John Beecher	78	3	8	11	−9	26
Matt Poitras	33	1	10	11	−5	8
Brandon Carlo^{‡}	63	1	8	9	+2	24
Hampus Lindholm	17	3	4	7	−4	4
Parker Wotherspoon	55	1	6	7	−10	10
Casey Mittelstadt^{†}	18	4	2	6	−17	4
Jordan Oesterle^{‡}	22	1	5	6	+3	2
Vinni Lettieri	26	3	2	5	−9	6
Marat Khusnutdinov^{‡}	18	3	2	5	−5	6
Jakub Lauko^{‡}	18	2	3	5	−8	20
Henri Jokiharju^{‡}	18	0	4	4	+7	2
Fabian Lysell	12	1	2	3	−4	6
Marc McLaughlin^{‡}	12	2	0	2	−1	0
Oliver Wahlstrom^{†}	16	1	1	2	0	28
Tyler Johnson	9	0	2	2	−1	10
Michael Callahan	17	1	0	1	−5	7
John Farinacci	1	1	0	1	+1	0
Fraser Minten^{†}	6	1	0	1	−1	2
Patrick Brown	15	0	1	1	−2	8
Ian Mitchell	15	0	1	1	−2	2
Georgii Merkulov	6	0	1	1	−1	2
Riley Tufte	6	0	0	0	−3	4
Max Jones^{‡}	7	0	0	0	−4	8
Jeffrey Viel	5	0	0	0	−1	14
Riley Duran	2	0	0	0	−1	2
Frederic Brunet	1	0	0	0	−1	0

=== Goaltenders ===
Regular season
Player	GP	GS	TOI	W	L	OT	GA	GAA	SA	SV%	SO	G	A	PIM
Jeremy Swayman	58	58	3390:35	22	29	7	176	3.11	1,632	.892	4	0	0	2
Joonas Korpisalo	27	24	1529:42	11	10	3	74	2.90	693	.893	3	0	0	0

^{†}Denotes player spent time with another team before joining the Bruins. Stats reflect time with the Bruins only.
^{‡}Denotes player was traded mid-season. Stats reflect time with the Bruins only.

== Transactions ==
The Bruins have been involved in the transactions during the 2024–25 season.

Key:

† Contract is entry-level.
‡ Contract initially takes effect in the 2025–26 season.

=== Trades ===
Date	Details		Ref
June 29, 2024	To Minnesota Wild Jakub Lauko; 4th-round pick in 2024	To Boston Bruins Vinni Lettieri; 4th-round pick in 2024	
March 4, 2025	To New Jersey Devils Trent Frederic	To Boston Bruins Petr Hauser	
March 4, 2025	To Edmonton Oilers Max Jones Petr Hauser	To Boston Bruins Max Wanner; 2nd-round pick in 2025 (from St. Louis) 4th-round pick in 2026	
March 6, 2025	To Minnesota Wild Justin Brazeau	To Boston Bruins Marat Khusnutdinov Jakub Lauko 6th-round pick in 2026 (from Boston)	
March 7, 2025	To Toronto Maple Leafs Brandon Carlo	To Boston Bruins Fraser Minten Conditional 1st-round pick in 2026 4th-round pick in 2025	
March 7, 2025	To Colorado Avalanche Charlie Coyle 5th-round pick in 2026	To Boston Bruins Casey Mittelstadt Will Zellers conditional 2nd-round pick in 2025	
March 7, 2025	To Florida Panthers Brad Marchand	To Boston Bruins conditional 2nd-round pick in 2027	
March 7, 2025	To Buffalo Sabres 4th-round pick in 2026 (from Edmonton)	To Boston Bruins Henri Jokiharju	
March 7, 2025	To New Jersey Devils Marc McLaughlin	To Boston Bruins Daniil Misyul	

=== Players acquired ===
Date	Player	Former team	Term	Via	Ref
July 1, 2024	Max Jones	Anaheim Ducks	2-year	Free agency	
July 1, 2024	Cole Koepke	Tampa Bay Lightning	1-year	Free agency	
July 1, 2024	Elias Lindholm	Vancouver Canucks	7-year	Free agency	
July 1, 2024	Jordan Oesterle	Calgary Flames	2-year	Free agency	
July 1, 2024	Billy Sweezey	Columbus Blue Jackets	2-year	Free agency	
July 1, 2024	Riley Tufte	Colorado Avalanche	1-year	Free agency	
July 1, 2024	Jeffrey Viel	Winnipeg Jets	2-year	Free agency	
July 1, 2024	Nikita Zadorov	Vancouver Canucks	6-year	Free agency	
October 2, 2024	Jiri Patera	Vancouver Canucks		Waivers	
November 4, 2024	Tyler Johnson	Chicago Blackhawks	1-year	Free agency	
March 6, 2025	Tyler Pitlick	Providence Bruins (AHL)	1-year	Free agency	

=== Players lost ===
Date	Player	New team	Term	Via	Ref
July 1, 2024	Patrick Maroon	Chicago Blackhawks	1-year	Free agency	
July 18, 2024	Kyle Keyser	Kunlun Red Star (KHL)	1-year	Free agency	

=== Signings ===
Date	Player	Term	Ref
July 12, 2024	Michael Callahan	1-year	
July 12, 2024	Alec Regula	1-year	
July 16, 2024	Marc McLaughlin	1-year	
October 6, 2024	Jeremy Swayman	8-year	

== Draft picks ==
Round	#	Player	Pos	Nationality	College/Junior/Club team (League)
1	25	Dean Letourneau	C	Canada	St. Andrew's College Saints (CISAA)
4	110	Elliott Groenewold	D	United States	Cedar Rapids RoughRiders (USHL)
5	154	Jonathan Morello	C	Canada	St. Michael's Buzzers (OJHL)
6	186	Loke Johansson	D	Sweden	AIK IF (J20 Nationell)
