= 2024–25 Carolina Hurricanes season =

Season of play of professional ice hockey team

2024–25 Carolina Hurricanes
- Division: 2nd Metropolitan
- Conference: 4th Eastern
- 2024–25 record: 47–30–5
- Home record: 31–9–1
- Road record: 16–21–4
- Goals for: 266
- Goals against: 233

Team information
- General manager: Eric Tulsky
- Coach: Rod Brind'Amour
- Captain: Jordan Staal
- Alternate captains: Sebastian Aho; Jordan Martinook; Jaccob Slavin
- Arena: Lenovo Center
- Average attendance: 18,795
- Minor league affiliates: Chicago Wolves (AHL); Bloomington Bison (ECHL) (Note: This was a working agreement rather than a formal affiliation; the Bison's primary affiliation was with the New York Rangers.)

Team leaders
- Goals: Seth Jarvis (32)
- Assists: Sebastian Aho (45)
- Points: Sebastian Aho (74)
- Penalty minutes: Andrei Svechnikov (59)
- Plus/minus: Jalen Chatfield (+22)
- Wins: Pyotr Kochetkov (27)
- Goals against average: Dustin Tokarski (2.18)

The 2024–25 Carolina Hurricanes season was the 46th season (45th season of play) for the National Hockey League (NHL) franchise that was established in June 1979, and the 27th season since the franchise relocated from the Hartford Whalers to start the 1997–98 season.

On April 2, 2025, the Hurricanes clinched their seventh consecutive playoff spot after they won in regulation against the Washington Capitals. In the playoffs, the Hurricanes defeated the New Jersey Devils in five games in the first round, defeated the Washington Capitals in five games in the second round, but lost to the eventual Stanley Cup champion Florida Panthers in five games in the Eastern Conference finals despite breaking their conference finals losing streak dating back to 2006 at 15 games.

== Off-season ==
On May 24, 2024, Don Waddell resigned as general manager and president after six seasons. Eric Tulsky was named interim general manager that same day. On June 18, Tulsky was promoted to full-time general manager.

== Standings ==
=== Divisional standings ===
Metropolitan Division
Pos	Team	GP	W	L	OTL	RW	GF	GA	GD	Pts
1	z – Washington Capitals	82	51	22	9	43	288	232	+56	111
2	x – Carolina Hurricanes	82	47	30	5	42	266	233	+33	99
3	x – New Jersey Devils	82	42	33	7	36	242	222	+20	91
4	Columbus Blue Jackets	82	40	33	9	30	273	268	+5	89
5	New York Rangers	82	39	36	7	35	256	255	+1	85
6	New York Islanders	82	35	35	12	28	224	260	−36	82
7	Pittsburgh Penguins	82	34	36	12	24	243	293	−50	80
8	Philadelphia Flyers	82	33	39	10	21	238	286	−48	76

Source: National Hockey League
Rules for classification: 1) Fewer number of games played (GP, only during regular season); 2) Greater number of regulation wins (RW); 3) Greater number of wins in regulation and overtime, excluding shootout wins (ROW); 4) Greater number of total wins, including shootouts (W); 5) Greater number of points earned in head-to-head play; if teams played an uneven number of head-to-head games, the result of the first game on the home ice of the team with the extra home game is discarded; 6) Greater goal differential (GD); 7) Greater number of goals scored (GF)
x – Clinched playoff spot; z – Clinched conference

=== Conference standings ===
Eastern Conference Wild Card
Pos	Div	Team	GP	W	L	OTL	RW	GF	GA	GD	Pts
1	AT	x – Ottawa Senators	82	45	30	7	35	243	234	+9	97
2	AT	x – Montreal Canadiens	82	40	31	11	30	245	265	−20	91
3	ME	Columbus Blue Jackets	82	40	33	9	30	273	268	+5	89
4	AT	Detroit Red Wings	82	39	35	8	30	238	259	−21	86
5	ME	New York Rangers	82	39	36	7	35	256	255	+1	85
6	ME	New York Islanders	82	35	35	12	28	224	260	−36	82
7	ME	Pittsburgh Penguins	82	34	36	12	24	243	293	−50	80
8	AT	Buffalo Sabres	82	36	39	7	29	269	289	−20	79
9	AT	Boston Bruins	82	33	39	10	26	222	272	−50	76
10	ME	Philadelphia Flyers	82	33	39	10	21	238	286	−48	76

Source: National Hockey League
Rules for classification: 1) Fewer number of games played (GP, only during regular season); 2) Greater number of regulation wins (RW); 3) Greater number of wins in regulation and overtime, excluding shootout wins (ROW); 4) Greater number of total wins, including shootouts (W); 5) Greater number of points earned in head-to-head play; if teams played an uneven number of head-to-head games, the result of the first game on the home ice of the team with the extra home game is discarded; 6) Greater goal differential (GD); 7) Greater number of goals scored (GF)
x – Clinched playoff spot

== Schedule and results ==
=== Preseason ===
The Carolina Hurricanes preseason schedule was released on June 25, 2024.

2024 preseason game log: 4–1–1 (Home: 2–1–0; Road: 2–0–1)

Game	Date	Opponent	Score	OT	Decision	Location	Attendance	Record	Recap
1	September 24	@ Tampa Bay	2–1		Kochetkov	Amalie Arena	9,135	1–0–0	
2	September 27	Florida	8–2		Andersen	Lenovo Center	14,875	2–0–0	
3	September 28	@ Florida	4–5	OT	Martin	Amerant Bank Arena	14,702	2–0–1	
4	October 2	Nashville	4–6		Perets	Lenovo Center	18,700	2–1–1	
5	October 4	Tampa Bay	2–1	OT	Kochetkov	Lenovo Center	16,005	3–1–1	
6	October 5	@ Nashville	5–3		Martin	Bridgestone Arena	17,159	4–1–1	

=== Regular season ===
The Carolina Hurricanes regular season schedule was released on July 2, 2024.

2024–25 game log
October: 7–2–0 (home: 2–1–0; road: 5–1–0)

Game	Date	Opponent	Score	OT	Decision	Location	Attendance	Record	Points	Recap
1	October 11	Tampa Bay	1–4		Andersen	Lenovo Center	18,817	0–1–0	0	
–	October 12	@ Tampa Bay	Game postponed to January 7 due to Hurricane Milton.							
2	October 15	New Jersey	4–2		Kochetkov	Lenovo Center	18,700	1–1–0	2	
3	October 18	@ Pittsburgh	4–1		Andersen	PPG Paints Arena	17,074	2–1–0	4	
4	October 19	@ St. Louis	3–4		Kochetkov	Enterprise Center	18,096	2–2–0	4	
5	October 22	@ Edmonton	3–2	OT	Andersen	Rogers Place	18,347	3–2–0	6	
6	October 24	@ Calgary	4–2		Kochetkov	Scotiabank Saddledome	16,404	4–2–0	8	
7	October 26	@ Seattle	4–1		Andersen	Climate Pledge Arena	17,151	5–2–0	10	
8	October 28	@ Vancouver	4–3	OT	Kochetkov	Rogers Arena	18,682	6–2–0	12	
9	October 31	Boston	8–2		Kochetkov	Lenovo Center	18,700	7–2–0	14	

November: 9–5–1 (home: 7–1–0; road: 2–4–1)

Game	Date	Opponent	Score	OT	Decision	Location	Attendance	Record	Points	Recap
10	November 3	Washington	4–2		Kochetkov	Lenovo Center	18,796	8–2–0	16	
11	November 5	Philadelphia	6–4		Kochetkov	Lenovo Center	18,700	9–2–0	18	
12	November 7	Pittsburgh	5–1		Kochetkov	Lenovo Center	18,700	10–2–0	20	
13	November 9	@ Colorado	4–6		Martin	Ball Arena	18,089	10–3–0	20	
14	November 11	@ Vegas	5–2		Kochetkov	T-Mobile Arena	17,908	11–3–0	22	
15	November 13	@ Utah	1–4		Kochetkov	Delta Center	11,131	11–4–0	22	
16	November 16	Ottawa	4–0		Martin	Lenovo Center	18,808	12–4–0	24	
17	November 17	St. Louis	4–1		Kochetkov	Lenovo Center	18,797	13–4–0	26	
18	November 20	@ Philadelphia	4–1		Kochetkov	Wells Fargo Center	17,535	14–4–0	28	
19	November 21	@ New Jersey	2–4		Martin	Prudential Center	16,086	14–5–0	28	
20	November 23	@ Columbus	4–5	SO	Martin	Nationwide Arena	16,013	14–5–1	29	
21	November 25	Dallas	6–4		Martin	Lenovo Center	18,812	15–5–1	31	
22	November 27	NY Rangers	4–3		Martin	Lenovo Center	18,905	16–5–1	33	
23	November 29	Florida	3–6		Martin	Lenovo Center	18,920	16–6–1	33	
24	November 30	@ Florida	0–6		Martin	Amerant Bank Arena	18,648	16–7–1	33	

December: 6–6–1 (home: 5–2–0; road: 1–4–1)

Game	Date	Opponent	Score	OT	Decision	Location	Attendance	Record	Points	Recap
25	December 3	Seattle	2–4		Kochetkov	Lenovo Center	18,700	16–8–1	33	
26	December 5	Colorado	5–3		Kochetkov	Lenovo Center	18,700	17–8–1	35	
27	December 7	@ NY Islanders	3–4		Kochetkov	UBS Arena	15,619	17–9–1	35	
28	December 10	San Jose	3–2		Kochetkov	Lenovo Center	18,700	18–9–1	37	
29	December 13	Ottawa	0–3		Kochetkov	Lenovo Center	18,700	18–10–1	37	
30	December 15	Columbus	4–1		Tokarski	Lenovo Center	18,700	19–10–1	39	
31	December 17	NY Islanders	4–0		Kochetkov	Lenovo Center	18,700	20–10–1	41	
32	December 20	@ Washington	1–3		Kochetkov	Capital One Arena	18,573	20–11–1	41	
33	December 22	@ NY Rangers	3–1		Kochetkov	Madison Square Garden	18,006	21–11–1	43	
34	December 23	@ Nashville	2–5		Tokarski	Bridgestone Arena	17,159	21–12–1	43	
35	December 27	@ New Jersey	2–4		Kochetkov	Prudential Center	16,629	21–13–1	43	
36	December 28	New Jersey	5–2		Tokarski	Lenovo Center	18,825	22–13–1	45	
37	December 31	@ Columbus	3–4	SO	Kochetkov	Nationwide Arena	17,712	22–13–2	46	

January: 10–3–2 (home: 7–1–1; road: 3–2–1)

Game	Date	Opponent	Score	OT	Decision	Location	Attendance	Record	Points	Recap
38	January 2	@ Florida	3–1		Kochetkov	Amerant Bank Arena	19,434	23–13–2	48	
39	January 4	Minnesota	0–4		Kochetkov	Lenovo Center	18,903	23–14–2	48	
40	January 5	Pittsburgh	4–3	OT	Tokarski	Lenovo Center	18,891	24–14–2	50	
41	January 7	@ Tampa Bay	2–3		Kochetkov	Amalie Arena	19,092	24–15–2	50	
42	January 9	Toronto	6–3		Kochetkov	Lenovo Center	18,750	25–15–2	52	
43	January 10	Vancouver	2–0		Tokarski	Lenovo Center	18,750	26–15–2	54	
44	January 12	Anaheim	2–3	OT	Kochetkov	Lenovo Center	18,897	26–15–3	55	
45	January 15	@ Buffalo	2–4		Tokarski	KeyBank Center	13,449	26–16–3	55	
46	January 17	Vegas	3–2		Kochetkov	Lenovo Center	18,825	27–16–3	57	
47	January 20	@ Chicago	4–3	OT	Andersen	United Center	15,831	28–16–3	59	
48	January 21	@ Dallas	2–1		Kochetkov	American Airlines Center	18,532	29–16–3	61	
49	January 23	Columbus	7–4		Andersen	Lenovo Center	18,700	30–16–3	63	
50	January 25	@ NY Islanders	2–3	OT	Kochetkov	UBS Arena	17,255	30–16–4	64	
51	January 28	@ NY Rangers	4–0		Andersen	Madison Square Garden	17,629	31–16–4	66	
52	January 30	Chicago	3–2		Kochetkov	Lenovo Center	18,896	32–16–4	68	

February: 2–5–0 (home: 2–1–0; road: 0–4–0)

Game	Date	Opponent	Score	OT	Decision	Location	Attendance	Record	Points	Recap
53	February 1	Los Angeles	2–4		Andersen	Lenovo Center	18,977	32–17–4	68	
54	February 4	@ Winnipeg	0–3		Kochetkov	Canada Life Centre	13,082	32–18–4	68	
55	February 6	@ Minnesota	1–2		Andersen	Xcel Energy Center	18,273	32–19–4	68	
56	February 8	Utah	7–3		Kochetkov	Lenovo Center	19,005	33–19–4	70	
57	February 22	@ Toronto	3–6		Kochetkov	Scotiabank Arena	18,914	33–20–4	70	
58	February 25	@ Montreal	0–4		Andersen	Bell Centre	21,105	33–21–4	70	
59	February 27	Buffalo	5–2		Kochetkov	Lenovo Center	18,844	34–21–4	72	

March: 11–3–0 (home: 7–2–0; road: 4–1–0)

Game	Date	Opponent	Score	OT	Decision	Location	Attendance	Record	Points	Recap
60	March 1	Edmonton	1–3		Andersen	Lenovo Center	18,994	34–22–4	72	
61	March 2	Calgary	2–1	OT	Kochetkov	Lenovo Center	18,700	35–22–4	74	
62	March 4	@ Detroit	2–1		Andersen	Little Caesars Arena	18,573	36–22–4	76	
63	March 6	Boston	3–2		Kochetkov	Lenovo Center	18,700	37–22–4	78	
64	March 9	Winnipeg	4–2		Andersen	Lenovo Center	18,700	38–22–4	80	
65	March 11	Tampa Bay	4–1		Kochetkov	Lenovo Center	18,700	39–22–4	82	
66	March 14	Detroit	4–2		Andersen	Lenovo Center	18,845	40–22–4	84	
67	March 15	@ Philadelphia	5–0		Kochetkov	Wells Fargo Center	18,801	41–22–4	86	
68	March 20	@ San Jose	3–1		Andersen	SAP Center	11,373	42–22–4	88	
69	March 22	@ Los Angeles	2–7		Kochetkov	Crypto.com Arena	16,896	42–23–4	88	
70	March 23	@ Anaheim	5–2		Andersen	Honda Center	16,439	43–23–4	90	
71	March 25	Nashville	1–3		Kochetkov	Lenovo Center	18,700	43–24–4	90	
72	March 28	Montreal	4–1		Andersen	Lenovo Center	18,795	44–24–4	92	
73	March 30	NY Islanders	6–4		Kochetkov	Lenovo Center	18,700	45–24–4	94	

April: 2–6–1 (home: 2–1–0; road: 0–5–1)

Game	Date	Opponent	Score	OT	Decision	Location	Attendance	Record	Points	Recap
74	April 2	Washington	5–1		Andersen	Lenovo Center	18,908	46–24–4	96	
75	April 4	@ Detroit	3–5		Kochetkov	Little Caesars Arena	18,972	46–25–4	96	
76	April 5	@ Boston	1–5		Andersen	TD Garden	17,850	46–26–4	96	
77	April 8	@ Buffalo	0–3		Kochetkov	KeyBank Center	13,709	46–27–4	96	
78	April 10	@ Washington	4–5	SO	Andersen	Capital One Arena	18,573	46–27–5	97	
79	April 12	NY Rangers	7–3		Kochetkov	Lenovo Center	18,880	47–27–5	99	
80	April 13	Toronto	1–4		Andersen	Lenovo Center	18,905	47–28–5	99	
81	April 16	@ Montreal	2–4		Kochetkov	Bell Centre	21,105	47–29–5	99	
82	April 17	@ Ottawa	5–7		Andersen	Canadian Tire Centre	16,193	47–30–5	99	

Win (2 points) Loss (0 points) Overtime/shootout loss (1 point)

=== Playoffs ===
2025 Stanley Cup playoffs
Eastern Conference first round vs. (M3) New Jersey Devils: Carolina won 4–1

Game	Date	Opponent	Score	OT	Decision	Location	Attendance	Series	Recap
1	April 20	New Jersey	4–1		Andersen	Lenovo Center	18,895	1–0	
2	April 22	New Jersey	3–1		Andersen	Lenovo Center	18,895	2–0	
3	April 25	@ New Jersey	2–3	2OT	Andersen	Prudential Center	16,682	2–1	
4	April 27	@ New Jersey	5–2		Andersen	Prudential Center	17,054	3–1	
5	April 29	New Jersey	5–4	2OT	Kochetkov	Lenovo Center	18,933	4–1	

Eastern Conference second round vs. (M1) Washington Capitals: Carolina won 4–1

Game	Date	Opponent	Score	OT	Decision	Location	Attendance	Series	Recap
1	May 6	@ Washington	2–1	OT	Andersen	Capital One Arena	18,573	1–0	
2	May 8	@ Washington	1–3		Andersen	Capital One Arena	18,573	1–1	
3	May 10	Washington	4–0		Andersen	Lenovo Center	19,174	2–1	
4	May 12	Washington	5–2		Andersen	Lenovo Center	19,138	3–1	
5	May 15	@ Washington	3–1		Andersen	Capital One Arena	18,573	4–1	

Eastern Conference final vs. (A3) Florida Panthers: Florida won 4–1

Game	Date	Opponent	Score	OT	Decision	Location	Attendance	Series	Recap
1	May 20	Florida	2–5		Andersen	Lenovo Center	18,944	0–1	
2	May 22	Florida	0–5		Andersen	Lenovo Center	18,971	0–2	
3	May 24	@ Florida	2–6		Kochetkov	Amerant Bank Arena	19,836	0–3	
4	May 26	@ Florida	3–0		Andersen	Amerant Bank Arena	19,897	1–3	
5	May 28	Florida	3–5		Andersen	Lenovo Center	18,994	1–4	

Legend: Win Loss

== Player statistics ==
=== Skaters ===
Regular season
Player	GP	G	A	Pts	+/−	PIM
Sebastian Aho	79	29	45	74	+7	46
Seth Jarvis	73	32	35	67	+12	14
Martin Necas^{‡}	49	16	39	55	+4	10
Andrei Svechnikov	72	20	28	48	−8	59
Shayne Gostisbehere	70	7	38	45	+1	52
Jack Roslovic	81	22	17	39	−10	10
Jordan Martinook	79	15	21	36	+16	18
Jordan Staal	75	13	23	36	+15	16
Jackson Blake	80	17	17	34	+10	30
Jesperi Kotkaniemi	78	12	21	33	+9	50
Eric Robinson	82	14	18	32	+14	10
Brent Burns	82	6	23	29	+7	28
Dmitry Orlov	76	6	22	28	+16	24
Jaccob Slavin	80	6	21	26	+16	8
Taylor Hall^{†}	31	9	9	18	+1	20
Jalen Chatfield	79	7	11	18	+22	54
Sean Walker	82	5	11	16	−7	46
William Carrier	43	4	7	11	0	16
Logan Stankoven^{†}	19	5	4	9	−3	12
Jack Drury^{‡}	39	3	6	9	+1	12
Tyson Jost	39	4	5	9	+2	33
Mark Jankowski^{†}	19	8	0	8	+4	18
Mikko Rantanen^{†‡}	13	2	4	6	−3	10
Scott Morrow	14	1	5	6	+4	0
Juha Jaaska	18	0	4	4	0	9
Justin Robidas	2	1	1	2	+1	0
Ty Smith	8	1	1	2	+1	4
Skyler Brind'Amour	2	1	0	1	−3	2
Bradly Nadeau	2	0	1	1	0	0
Ryan Suzuki	2	0	0	0	+1	0
Domenick Fensore	2	0	0	0	0	2
Riley Stillman	3	0	0	0	−1	5

Playoffs
Player	GP	G	A	Pts	+/−	PIM
Seth Jarvis	15	6	10	16	+2	6
Sebastian Aho	15	7	8	15	+3	8
Andrei Svechnikov	15	8	4	12	+4	22
Shayne Gostisbehere	15	3	6	9	−9	4
Logan Stankoven	15	5	3	8	−1	2
Jackson Blake	15	3	3	6	0	6
Taylor Hall	15	2	4	6	−7	2
Jordan Martinook	15	1	5	6	+1	8
Brent Burns	15	1	4	5	+1	10
Jaccob Slavin	15	2	2	4	+10	0
Jack Roslovic	9	1	3	4	−3	0
Dmitry Orlov	15	0	4	4	+2	10
Jesperi Kotkaniemi	14	0	4	4	+1	14
Jordan Staal	15	2	1	3	−1	8
Sean Walker	12	1	2	3	+1	2
Eric Robinson	15	1	2	3	−3	2
Jalen Chatfield	9	1	0	1	+6	6
Mark Jankowski	7	0	1	1	0	0
Alexander Nikishin	4	0	1	1	−5	6
William Carrier	15	0	0	0	+1	8
Scott Morrow	5	0	0	0	−5	2

=== Goaltenders ===
Regular season
Player	GP	GS	TOI	W	L	OT	GA	GAA	SA	SV%	SO	G	A	PIM
Pyotr Kochetkov	47	47	2,790:42	27	16	3	121	2.60	1,172	.898	2	0	3	8
Frederik Andersen	22	22	1,319:31	13	8	1	55	2.50	546	.899	1	0	1	0
Dustin Tokarski	6	6	358:19	4	2	0	13	2.18	132	.902	1	0	0	0
Spencer Martin	9	7	415:59	3	4	1	27	3.89	175	.846	1	0	0	0
Yaniv Perets	1	0	8:12	0	0	0	1	7.32	7	.857	0	0	0	0

Playoffs
Player	GP	GS	TOI	W	L	GA	GAA	SA	SV%	SO	G	A	PIM
Frederik Andersen	13	13	743:04	8	5	25	2.02	269	.907	2	0	0	0
Pyotr Kochetkov	4	2	199:58	1	1	12	3.60	83	.855	0	0	0	2

^{†}Denotes player spent time with another team before joining the Hurricanes. Stats reflect time with the Hurricanes only.
^{‡}Denotes player was traded mid-season. Stats reflect time with the Hurricanes only.
Bold/italics denotes franchise record.

== Transactions ==
The Hurricanes have been involved in the following transactions during the 2024–25 season.

Key: † Contract is entry-level. ‡ Contract initially takes effect in the 2025–26 NHL season.

=== Trades ===
Date	Details		Ref
June 30, 2024	To Tampa Bay Lightning Jake Guentzel	To Carolina Hurricanes 3rd-round pick in 2025	
July 6, 2024	To Winnipeg Jets Dylan Coghlan	To Carolina Hurricanes Future considerations	
January 24, 2025	To Colorado Avalanche Jack Drury; Martin Necas; 2nd-round pick in 2025; 4th-round pick in 2026	To Carolina Hurricanes Taylor Hall; Nils Juntorp; Mikko Rantanen	
January 24, 2025	To Chicago Blackhawks CHI 3rd-round pick in 2025	To Carolina Hurricanes Taylor Hall; Nils Juntorp; Mikko Rantanen	
March 7, 2025	To Dallas Stars Mikko Rantanen	To Carolina Hurricanes Logan Stankoven; 1st-round pick in 2026; 3rd-round pick in 2026; 3rd-round pick in 2027; 1st-round pick in 2028	
March 7, 2025	To Nashville Predators 5th-round pick in 2025	To Carolina Hurricanes Mark Jankowski	
March 30, 2025	To Tampa Bay Lightning Lucas Mecuri	To Carolina Hurricanes 6th-round pick in 2025	

=== Players acquired ===
Date	Player	Former team	Term	Via	Ref
July 1, 2024	William Carrier	Vegas Golden Knights	6-year	Free agency	
July 1, 2024	Shayne Gostisbehere	Detroit Red Wings	3-year	Free agency	
July 1, 2024	Tyson Jost	Buffalo Sabres	1-year	Free agency	
July 1, 2024	Eric Robinson	Buffalo Sabres	1-year	Free agency	
July 1, 2024	Sean Walker	Colorado Avalanche	5-year	Free agency	
July 3, 2024	Riley Stillman	Buffalo Sabres	1-year	Free agency	
July 4, 2024	Jack Roslovic	New York Rangers	1-year	Free agency	
July 7, 2024	Josiah Slavin	Toronto Marlies (AHL)	1-year	Free agency	
July 14, 2024	Joakim Ryan	Malmö Redhawks (SHL)	1-year	Free agency	
December 2, 2024	Dustin Tokarski	Buffalo Sabres	1-year	Free agency	

=== Players lost ===
Date	Player	New team	Term	Via	Ref
July 1, 2024	Stefan Noesen	New Jersey Devils	3-year	Free agency	
July 1, 2024	Brett Pesce	New Jersey Devils	6-year	Free agency	
July 1, 2024	Brady Skjei	Nashville Predators	7-year	Free agency	
July 1, 2024	Teuvo Teravainen	Chicago Blackhawks	3-year	Free agency	
July 4, 2024	Callahan Burke	Vegas Golden Knights	1-year	Free agency	
July 17, 2024	Evgeny Kuznetsov	SKA St. Petersburg (KHL)	4-year	Contract termination	
July 18, 2024	Max Comtois	Dynamo Moscow (KHL)	1-year	Free agency	
September 15, 2024	Antti Raanta	Genève-Servette HC (NL)	1-year	Retirement/Free agency	
September 23, 2024	Tony DeAngelo	SKA St. Petersburg (KHL)	1-year	Free agency	
December 6, 2024	Brendan Lemieux	HC Davos (NL)	3-year	Contract termination	

=== Signings ===
Date	Player	Term	Ref
July 1, 2024	Jordan Martinook	3-year	
July 1, 2024	Jaccob Slavin	8-year‡	
July 14, 2024	Dominik Badinka	3-year†	
July 17, 2024	Jack Drury	2-year	
July 29, 2024	Martin Necas	2-year	
August 31, 2024	Seth Jarvis	8-year	
April 11, 2025	Alexander Nikishin	2-year†	
April 30, 2025	Taylor Hall	3-year	
May 3, 2025	Frederik Andersen	1-year‡	

== Draft picks ==
Below are the Carolina Hurricanes selections at the 2024 NHL entry draft, which was held on June 28 and 29, 2024, at the Sphere in Las Vegas, Nevada.

Round	#	Player	Pos	Nationality	College/Junior/Club team (League)
2	34	Dominik Badinka	D	Czech Republic	Malmö Redhawks (SHL)
2	50	Nikita Artamonov	LW	Russia	Torpedo Nizhny Novgorod (KHL)
3	69	Noel Fransen	D	Sweden	Färjestad BK (J20 Nationell)
4	124	Alexander Siryatsky	D	Russia	Stalnye Lisy (MHL)
5	133	Oskar Vuollet	C	Sweden	Skellefteå AIK (J20 Nationell)
5	156	Justin Poirier	RW	Canada	Baie-Comeau Drakkar (QMJHL)
6	168	Timur Kol	D	Russia	Omskie Yastreby (MHL)
6	184	Roman Shokhrin	D	Russia	Loko Yaroslavl (MHL)
6	188	Fyodor Avramov	LW	Russia	Kapitan Stupino (MHL)
7	220	Andrey Krutov	LW	Russia	Chaika Nizhny Novgorod (MHL)
