= 2024–25 Winnipeg Jets season =

National Hockey League season

2024–25 Winnipeg Jets
- Presidents' Trophy winners
- Central Division champions
- Division: 1st Central
- Conference: 1st Western
- 2024–25 record: 56–22–4
- Home record: 30–7–4
- Road record: 26–15–0
- Goals for: 277
- Goals against: 191

Team information
- General manager: Kevin Cheveldayoff
- Coach: Scott Arniel
- Captain: Adam Lowry
- Alternate captains: Josh Morrissey; Mark Scheifele
- Arena: Canada Life Centre
- Average attendance: 14,366
- Minor league affiliate: Manitoba Moose (AHL) Norfolk Admirals (ECHL)

Team leaders
- Goals: Kyle Connor (41)
- Assists: Kyle Connor (56)
- Points: Kyle Connor (97)
- Penalty minutes: Logan Stanley (78)
- Plus/minus: Dylan Samberg (+34)
- Wins: Connor Hellebuyck (47)
- Goals against average: Connor Hellebuyck (2.00)

The 2024–25 Winnipeg Jets season was the 42nd season of play for the National Hockey League (NHL) franchise that was established on June 22, 1979, 50th season for the organization overall, and the 14th in Winnipeg, since the franchise relocated from Atlanta prior to the start of the 2011–12 NHL season.

On November 9, 2024, the Jets defeated the Dallas Stars, 4–1, for their 14th win in their first 15 games to start the season, setting the NHL record for the best start to a season in NHL history.

On March 25, 2025, the Jets clinched their third consecutive playoff berth, and their seventh in the past eight seasons after a 3–2 win in overtime against the Washington Capitals.

On April 7, the Jets recorded their 53rd win after a 3–1 win against the St. Louis Blues, setting a record for most wins in a season in both Jets/Thrashers history and for an NHL team based in Winnipeg. On April 16, the Jets recorded their 115th point after going into overtime against the Anaheim Ducks and then recorded their 116th point with the 2–1 overtime victory, setting the franchise record for points, breaking the previous record of 114, set by the 2017–18 Winnipeg Jets.

On April 12, they clinched the best record in the Western Conference and the Central Division title, the second in franchise history after the Thrashers' Southeast Division title in 2006–07 and the first division title for a Winnipeg-based NHL team after they defeated the Chicago Blackhawks in overtime.

On April 13, the Jets clinched their first franchise Presidents' Trophy after the Washington Capitals lost to the Columbus Blue Jackets. They became the first Canadian team to win the Presidents' Trophy since the Vancouver Canucks did it in back-to-back years in 2010–11 and 2011–12.

In the playoffs, the Jets faced the St. Louis Blues in the first round and won in seven games, but lost to the Dallas Stars in the second round, losing in six games.

== Standings ==
=== Divisional standings ===
Central Division
Pos	Team	GP	W	L	OTL	RW	GF	GA	GD	Pts
1	p – Winnipeg Jets	82	56	22	4	43	277	191	+86	116
2	x – Dallas Stars	82	50	26	6	41	277	224	+53	106
3	x – Colorado Avalanche	82	49	29	4	40	277	234	+43	102
4	x – Minnesota Wild	82	45	30	7	33	228	239	−11	97
5	x – St. Louis Blues	82	44	30	8	32	254	233	+21	96
6	Utah Hockey Club	82	38	31	13	30	241	251	−10	89
7	Nashville Predators	82	30	44	8	24	214	274	−60	68
8	Chicago Blackhawks	82	25	46	11	20	226	296	−70	61

Source: National Hockey League
Rules for classification: 1) Fewer number of games played (GP, only during regular season); 2) Greater number of regulation wins (RW); 3) Greater number of wins in regulation and overtime, excluding shootout wins (ROW); 4) Greater number of total wins, including shootouts (W); 5) Greater number of points earned in head-to-head play; if teams played an uneven number of head-to-head games, the result of the first game on the home ice of the team with the extra home game is discarded; 6) Greater goal differential (GD); 7) Greater number of goals scored (GF)
p – Clinched Presidents' Trophy; x – Clinched playoff spot

=== Conference standings ===
Western Conference Wild Card
Pos	Div	Team	GP	W	L	OTL	RW	GF	GA	GD	Pts
1	CE	x – Minnesota Wild	82	45	30	7	33	228	239	−11	97
2	CE	x – St. Louis Blues	82	44	30	8	32	254	233	+21	96
3	PA	Calgary Flames	82	41	27	14	31	225	238	−13	96
4	PA	Vancouver Canucks	82	38	30	14	28	236	253	−17	90
5	CE	Utah Hockey Club	82	38	31	13	30	241	251	−10	89
6	PA	Anaheim Ducks	82	35	37	10	24	221	263	−42	80
7	PA	Seattle Kraken	82	35	41	6	28	247	265	−18	76
8	CE	Nashville Predators	82	30	44	8	24	214	274	−60	68
9	CE	Chicago Blackhawks	82	25	46	11	20	226	296	−70	61
10	PA	San Jose Sharks	82	20	50	12	14	210	315	−105	52

Source: National Hockey League
Rules for classification: 1) Fewer number of games played (GP, only during regular season); 2) Greater number of regulation wins (RW); 3) Greater number of wins in regulation and overtime, excluding shootout wins (ROW); 4) Greater number of total wins, including shootouts (W); 5) Greater number of points earned in head-to-head play; if teams played an uneven number of head-to-head games, the result of the first game on the home ice of the team with the extra home game is discarded; 6) Greater goal differential (GD); 7) Greater number of goals scored (GF)
x – Clinched playoff spot

== Schedule and results ==
=== Preseason ===
The Winnipeg Jets 2024 Pre-Season was released on June 20, 2024.

2024 preseason: 3–2–1 (home: 2–1–0; road: 1–1–1)

Game	Date	Visitor	Score	Home	OT	Decision	Location	Attendance	Record	Recap
1	September 21	Minnesota	5–2	Winnipeg		Kahkonen	Canada Life Centre	13,787	0–1–0	
2	September 22	Winnipeg	2–3	Edmonton	OT	Comrie	Rogers Place	13,133	0–1–1	
3	September 25	Edmonton	1–6	Winnipeg		Kahkonen	Canada Life Centre	12,367	1–1–1	
4	September 27	Winnipeg	5–8	Minnesota		Hellebuyck	Xcel Energy Center	16,560	1–2–1	
5	October 2	Calgary	2–5	Winnipeg		Hellebuyck	Canada Life Centre	12,013	2–2–1	
6	October 4	Winnipeg	3–2	Calgary		Hellebuyck	Scotiabank Saddledome	16,311	3–2–1	

=== Regular season ===
The Winnipeg Jets regular season schedule was released on July 2, 2024.

2024–25 game log
October: 9–1–0 (home: 4–1–0; road: 5–0–0)

Game	Date	Visitor	Score	Home	OT	Decision	Location	Attendance	Record	Points	Recap
1	October 9	Winnipeg	6–0	Edmonton		Hellebuyck	Rogers Place	18,347	1–0–0	2	
2	October 11	Chicago	1–2	Winnipeg	OT	Hellebuyck	Canada Life Centre	14,564	2–0–0	4	
3	October 13	Minnesota	1–2	Winnipeg	OT	Hellebuyck	Canada Life Centre	12,916	3–0–0	6	
4	October 18	San Jose	3–8	Winnipeg		Hellebuyck	Canada Life Centre	13,422	4–0–0	8	
5	October 20	Pittsburgh	3–6	Winnipeg		Comrie	Canada Life Centre	13,760	5–0–0	10	
6	October 22	Winnipeg	3–2	St. Louis		Hellebuyck	Enterprise Center	17,335	6–0–0	12	
7	October 24	Winnipeg	4–3	Seattle	OT	Hellebuyck	Climate Pledge Arena	17,151	7–0–0	14	
8	October 26	Winnipeg	5–3	Calgary		Comrie	Scotiabank Saddledome	16,886	8–0–0	16	
9	October 28	Toronto	6–4	Winnipeg		Hellebuyck	Canada Life Centre	15,225	8–1–0	16	
10	October 30	Winnipeg	6–2	Detroit		Hellebuyck	Little Caesars Arena	18,780	9–1–0	18	

November: 9–5–0 (home: 5–0–0; road: 4–5–0)

Game	Date	Visitor	Score	Home	OT	Decision	Location	Attendance	Record	Points	Recap
11	November 1	Winnipeg	6–2	Columbus		Comrie	Nationwide Arena	15,823	10–1–0	20	
12	November 3	Tampa Bay	4–7	Winnipeg		Hellebuyck	Canada Life Centre	12,912	11–1–0	22	
13	November 5	Utah	0–3	Winnipeg		Hellebuyck	Canada Life Centre	12,932	12–1–0	24	
14	November 7	Colorado	0–1	Winnipeg		Hellebuyck	Canada Life Centre	12,918	13–1–0	26	
15	November 9	Dallas	1–4	Winnipeg		Hellebuyck	Canada Life Centre	15,225	14–1–0	28	
16	November 12	Winnipeg	6–3	NY Rangers		Hellebuyck	Madison Square Garden	18,006	15–1–0	30	
17	November 14	Winnipeg	1–4	Tampa Bay		Comrie	Amalie Arena	19,092	15–2–0	30	
18	November 16	Winnipeg	0–5	Florida		Hellebuyck	Amerant Bank Arena	19,157	15–3–0	30	
19	November 19	Florida	3–6	Winnipeg		Hellebuyck	Canada Life Centre	15,225	16–3–0	32	
20	November 22	Winnipeg	4–1	Pittsburgh		Hellebuyck	PPG Paints Arena	15,232	17–3–0	34	
21	November 23	Winnipeg	1–4	Nashville		Comrie	Bridgestone Arena	17,159	17–4–0	34	
22	November 25	Winnipeg	4–1	Minnesota		Hellebuyck	Xcel Energy Center	17,686	18–4–0	36	
23	November 27	Winnipeg	1–4	Los Angeles		Hellebuyck	Crypto.com Arena	17,395	18–5–0	36	
24	November 29	Winnipeg	3–4	Vegas		Comrie	T-Mobile Arena	18,044	18–6–0	36	

December: 9–5–1 (home: 6–2–1; road: 3–3–0)

Game	Date	Visitor	Score	Home	OT	Decision	Location	Attendance	Record	Points	Recap
25	December 1	Winnipeg	1–3	Dallas		Hellebuyck	American Airlines Center	18,532	18–7–0	36	
26	December 3	St. Louis	4–1	Winnipeg		Hellebuyck	Canada Life Centre	13,100	18–8–0	36	
27	December 5	Winnipeg	3–2	Buffalo	OT	Hellebuyck	KeyBank Center	14,497	19–8–0	38	
28	December 7	Winnipeg	4–2	Chicago		Hellebuyck	United Center	18,581	20–8–0	40	
29	December 8	Columbus	4–1	Winnipeg		Comrie	Canada Life Centre	13,887	20–9–0	40	
30	December 10	Boston	1–8	Winnipeg		Hellebuyck	Canada Life Centre	12,921	21–9–0	42	
31	December 12	Vegas	3–2	Winnipeg	OT	Hellebuyck	Canada Life Centre	13,320	21–9–1	43	
32	December 14	Montreal	2–4	Winnipeg		Hellebuyck	Canada Life Centre	15,225	22–9–1	45	
33	December 17	Winnipeg	4–3	San Jose		Hellebuyck	SAP Center	10,958	23–9–1	47	
34	December 18	Winnipeg	2–3	Anaheim		Comrie	Honda Center	16,260	23–10–1	47	
35	December 21	Minnesota	0–5	Winnipeg		Hellebuyck	Canada Life Centre	15,225	24–10–1	49	
36	December 23	Winnipeg	5–2	Toronto		Hellebuyck	Scotiabank Arena	18,923	25–10–1	51	
37	December 28	Ottawa	2–4	Winnipeg		Hellebuyck	Canada Life Centre	14,734	26–10–1	53	
38	December 30	Nashville	0–3	Winnipeg		Hellebuyck	Canada Life Centre	15,225	27–10–1	55	
39	December 31	Winnipeg	2–5	Colorado		Comrie	Ball Arena	18,094	27–11–1	55	

January: 9–3–2 (home: 6–2–2; road: 3–1–0)

Game	Date	Visitor	Score	Home	OT	Decision	Location	Attendance	Record	Points	Recap
40	January 2	Anaheim	4–3	Winnipeg	OT	Hellebuyck	Canada Life Centre	15,225	27–11–2	56	
41	January 4	Detroit	4–2	Winnipeg		Hellebuyck	Canada Life Centre	14,527	27–12–2	56	
42	January 7	Nashville	2–5	Winnipeg		Hellebuyck	Canada Life Centre	13,105	28–12–2	58	
43	January 10	Los Angeles	2–1	Winnipeg	OT	Comrie	Canada Life Centre	14,218	28–12–3	59	
44	January 11	Colorado	0–3	Winnipeg		Hellebuyck	Canada Life Centre	14,782	29–12–3	61	
45	January 14	Vancouver	1–6	Winnipeg		Hellebuyck	Canada Life Centre	14,050	30–12–3	63	
46	January 16	Seattle	1–2	Winnipeg		Hellebuyck	Canada Life Centre	13,959	31–12–3	65	
47	January 18	Calgary	3–1	Winnipeg		Comrie	Canada Life Centre	15,225	31–13–3	65	
48	January 20	Winnipeg	2–5	Utah		Hellebuyck	Delta Center	11,131	31–14–3	65	
49	January 22	Winnipeg	3–2	Colorado	OT	Hellebuyck	Ball Arena	18,125	32–14–3	67	
50	January 24	Utah	2–5	Winnipeg		Hellebuyck	Canada Life Centre	13,878	33–14–3	69	
51	January 26	Calgary	2–5	Winnipeg		Comrie	Canada Life Centre	14,491	34–14–3	71	
52	January 28	Winnipeg	4–1	Montreal		Hellebuyck	Bell Centre	21,105	35–14–3	73	
53	January 30	Winnipeg	6–2	Boston		Hellebuyck	TD Garden	17,850	36–14–3	75	

February: 6–1–0 (home: 3–0–0; road: 3–1–0)

Game	Date	Visitor	Score	Home	OT	Decision	Location	Attendance	Record	Points	Recap
54	February 1	Winnipeg	5–4	Washington	OT	Hellebuyck	Capital One Arena	18,573	37–14–3	77	
55	February 4	Carolina	0–3	Winnipeg		Comrie	Canada Life Centre	13,082	38–14–3	79	
56	February 7	NY Islanders	3–4	Winnipeg		Hellebuyck	Canada Life Centre	14,685	39–14–3	81	
57	February 22	Winnipeg	4–3	St. Louis	SO	Comrie	Enterprise Center	17,665	40–14–3	83	
58	February 24	San Jose	1–2	Winnipeg	OT	Hellebuyck	Canada Life Centre	13,801	41–14–3	85	
59	February 26	Winnipeg	4–1	Ottawa		Hellebuyck	Canadian Tire Centre	17,831	42–14–3	87	
60	February 27	Winnipeg	1–2	Nashville		Comrie	Bridgestone Arena	17,159	42–15–3	87	

March: 9–4–1 (home: 5–1–1; road: 4–3–0)

Game	Date	Visitor	Score	Home	OT	Decision	Location	Attendance	Record	Points	Recap
61	March 1	Philadelphia	2–1	Winnipeg	SO	Hellebuyck	Canada Life Centre	14,436	42–15–4	88	
62	March 4	Winnipeg	2–3	NY Islanders		Hellebuyck	UBS Arena	14,723	42–16–4	88	
63	March 6	Winnipeg	4–1	Philadelphia		Comrie	Wells Fargo Center	18,619	43–16–4	90	
64	March 7	Winnipeg	6–1	New Jersey		Hellebuyck	Prudential Center	16,088	44–16–4	92	
65	March 9	Winnipeg	2–4	Carolina		Hellebuyck	Lenovo Center	18,700	44–17–4	92	
66	March 11	NY Rangers	1–2	Winnipeg		Hellebuyck	Canada Life Centre	14,278	45–17–4	94	
67	March 14	Dallas	1–4	Winnipeg		Hellebuyck	Canada Life Centre	15,225	46–17–4	96	
68	March 16	Winnipeg	3–2	Seattle	OT	Comrie	Climate Pledge Arena	17,151	47–17–4	98	
69	March 18	Winnipeg	2–6	Vancouver		Hellebuyck	Rogers Arena	18,968	47–18–4	98	
70	March 20	Winnipeg	4–3	Edmonton	OT	Hellebuyck	Rogers Place	18,347	48–18–4	100	
71	March 23	Buffalo	5–3	Winnipeg		Comrie	Canada Life Centre	15,225	48–19–4	100	
72	March 25	Washington	2–3	Winnipeg	OT	Hellebuyck	Canada Life Centre	15,225	49–19–4	102	
73	March 28	New Jersey	0–4	Winnipeg		Hellebuyck	Canada Life Centre	15,225	50–19–4	104	
74	March 30	Vancouver	1–3	Winnipeg		Hellebuyck	Canada Life Centre	15,225	51–19–4	106	

April: 5–3–0 (home: 2–1–0; road: 3–2–0)

Game	Date	Visitor	Score	Home	OT	Decision	Location	Attendance	Record	Points	Recap
75	April 1	Winnipeg	1–4	Los Angeles		Hellebuyck	Crypto.com Arena	15,012	51–20–4	106	
76	April 3	Winnipeg	4–0	Vegas		Comrie	T-Mobile Arena	18,022	52–20–4	108	
77	April 5	Winnipeg	1–4	Utah		Hellebuyck	Delta Center	11,131	52–21–4	108	
78	April 7	St. Louis	1–3	Winnipeg		Hellebuyck	Canada Life Centre	15,225	53–21–4	110	
79	April 10	Winnipeg	4–0	Dallas		Hellebuyck	American Airlines Center	18,532	54–21–4	112	
80	April 12	Winnipeg	5–4	Chicago	SO	Hellebuyck	United Center	20,634	55–21–4	114	
81	April 13	Edmonton	4–1	Winnipeg		Comrie	Canada Life Centre	15,225	55–22–4	114	
82	April 16	Anaheim	1–2	Winnipeg	OT	Hellebuyck	Canada Life Centre	15,225	56–22–4	116	

Win (2 Points) Loss (0 points) Overtime/shootout loss (1 point)

=== Playoffs ===
2025 Stanley Cup Playoffs
Western Conference first round vs. (WC2) St. Louis Blues: Winnipeg won 4–3

Game	Date	Visitor	Score	Home	OT	Decision	Location	Attendance	Series	Recap
1	April 19	St. Louis	3–5	Winnipeg		Hellebuyck	Canada Life Centre	15,225	1–0	
2	April 21	St. Louis	1–2	Winnipeg		Hellebuyck	Canada Life Centre	15,225	2–0	
3	April 24	Winnipeg	2–7	St. Louis		Hellebuyck	Enterprise Center	18,096	2–1	
4	April 27	Winnipeg	1–5	St. Louis		Hellebuyck	Enterprise Center	18,096	2–2	
5	April 30	St. Louis	3–5	Winnipeg		Hellebuyck	Canada Life Centre	15,225	3–2	
6	May 2	Winnipeg	2–5	St. Louis		Hellebuyck	Enterprise Center	18,096	3–3	
7	May 4	St. Louis	3–4	Winnipeg	2OT	Hellebuyck	Canada Life Centre	15,225	4–3	

Western Conference second round vs. (C2) Dallas Stars: Dallas won 4–2

Game	Date	Visitor	Score	Home	OT	Decision	Location	Attendance	Series	Recap
1	May 7	Dallas	3–2	Winnipeg		Hellebuyck	Canada Life Centre	15,225	0–1	
2	May 9	Dallas	0–4	Winnipeg		Hellebuyck	Canada Life Centre	15,225	1–1	
3	May 11	Winnipeg	2–5	Dallas		Hellebuyck	American Airlines Center	18,532	1–2	
4	May 13	Winnipeg	1–3	Dallas		Hellebuyck	American Airlines Center	18,532	1–3	
5	May 15	Dallas	0–4	Winnipeg		Hellebuyck	Canada Life Centre	15,225	2–3	
6	May 17	Winnipeg	1–2	Dallas	OT	Hellebuyck	American Airlines Center	18,532	2–4	

Win Loss

== Player statistics ==
Key:

† Denotes player spent time with another team before joining the Jets. Stats reflect time with the Jets only.
‡ Denotes player was traded mid-season. Stats reflect time with the Jets only.

=== Skaters ===
Regular season
Player	GP	G	A	Pts	+/−	PIM
Kyle Connor	82	41	56	97	+17	25
Mark Scheifele	82	39	48	87	+12	61
Nikolaj Ehlers	69	24	39	63	+14	17
Josh Morrissey	80	14	48	62	+17	22
Gabriel Vilardi	71	27	34	61	+9	14
Cole Perfetti	82	18	32	50	+14	20
Neal Pionk	69	10	29	39	+21	44
Vladislav Namestnikov	78	11	27	38	+20	38
Nino Niederreiter	82	17	20	37	+16	24
Adam Lowry	73	16	18	34	+18	28
Alex Iafallo	82	15	16	31	+21	15
Mason Appleton	71	10	12	22	+7	22
Dylan Samberg	60	6	14	20	+34	26
Dylan DeMelo	82	3	16	19	+31	38
Morgan Barron	74	8	7	15	+8	16
Colin Miller	60	4	11	15	+10	38
Logan Stanley	63	1	13	14	+9	78
Rasmus Kupari	59	5	3	8	–1	16
Haydn Fleury	39	0	7	7	–12	6
David Gustafsson	36	2	4	6	+10	7
Brandon Tanev^{†}	19	1	4	5	0	6
Nikita Chibrikov	4	2	1	3	+1	0
Luke Schenn^{†}	15	0	2	2	+5	4
Parker Ford	3	1	0	1	+1	2
Jaret Anderson-Dolan	7	0	1	1	+3	4
Ville Heinola	18	0	1	1	+6	4
Brad Lambert	5	0	1	1	0	2
Dominic Toninato	5	0	0	0	0	0
Dylan Coghlan	6	0	0	0	+1	4

Playoffs
Player	GP	G	A	Pts	+/−	PIM
Kyle Connor	13	5	12	17	+4	0
Mark Scheifele	11	5	6	11	+5	16
Nikolaj Ehlers	8	5	2	7	+1	4
Neal Pionk	13	1	6	7	+1	14
Mason Appleton	13	0	7	7	+5	16
Nino Niederreiter	13	4	2	6	–3	10
Vladislav Namestnikov	13	3	3	6	0	16
Cole Perfetti	13	3	3	6	–4	2
Josh Morrissey	12	0	6	6	0	8
Adam Lowry	13	4	0	4	+2	16
Dylan DeMelo	12	1	3	4	–1	10
Gabriel Vilardi	9	1	3	4	+1	4
Dylan Samberg	13	0	3	3	+1	2
Jaret Anderson-Dolan	5	1	1	2	–1	2
Alex Iafallo	13	1	1	2	–4	10
Colin Miller	4	0	2	2	+1	4
Haydn Fleury	8	0	2	2	+2	8
Morgan Barron	12	0	2	2	–6	0
David Gustafsson	4	1	0	1	0	0
Luke Schenn	11	0	1	1	–8	32
Dominic Toninato	2	0	0	0	–1	2
Brandon Tanev	13	0	0	0	–2	18
Logan Stanley	5	0	0	0	–2	42

=== Goaltenders ===
Regular season
Player	GP	GS	TOI	W	L	OT	GA	GAA	SA	SV%	SO	G	A	PIM
Connor Hellebuyck	63	62	3741:22	47	12	3	125	2.00	1664	.925	8	0	1	2
Eric Comrie	20	20	1179:33	9	10	1	44	2.39	547	.914	2	0	0	0

Playoffs
Player	GP	GS	TOI	W	L	GA	GAA	SA	SV%	SO	G	A	PIM
Connor Hellebuyck	13	13	759:14	6	7	39	3.08	290	.866	2	0	0	0
Eric Comrie	3	0	42:59	0	0	1	1.40	13	.923	0	0	0	0

== Transactions ==
The Jets have been involved in the following transactions during the 2024–25 season.

Key:

† Contract is entry-level.
‡ Contract initially takes effect in the 2025–26 season.

=== Trades ===
Date	Details		Ref
June 29, 2024	To Buffalo Sabres 4th-round pick in 2024 (#123 overall); 7th-round pick in 2024 (#219 overall)	To Winnipeg Jets PHI 4th-round pick in 2024 (#109 overall)	
July 6, 2024	To Carolina Hurricanes Future considerations	To Winnipeg Jets Dylan Coghlan	
August 22, 2024	To Pittsburgh Penguins Rutger McGroarty	To Winnipeg Jets Brayden Yager	
January 15, 2025	To Chicago Blackhawks Dmitry Kuzmin	To Winnipeg Jets Isaak Phillips	
March 6, 2025	To Florida Panthers Kaapo Kahkonen	To Winnipeg Jets Chris Driedger	
March 7, 2025	To Pittsburgh Penguins 2nd-round pick in 2026; 4th-round pick in 2027	To Winnipeg Jets Luke Schenn	
March 7, 2025	To Seattle Kraken 2nd-round pick in 2027	To Winnipeg Jets Brandon Tanev	

=== Players acquired ===
Date	Player	Former team	Term	Via	Ref
July 1, 2024	Eric Comrie	Buffalo Sabres	2-year	Free agency	
July 1, 2024	Kaapo Kahkonen	New Jersey Devils	1-year	Free agency	
July 2, 2024	Jaret Anderson-Dolan	Nashville Predators	2-year	Free agency	
July 3, 2024	Haydn Fleury	Tampa Bay Lightning	1-year	Free agency	
July 3, 2024	Mason Shaw	Minnesota Wild	1-year	Free agency	

=== Players lost ===
Date	Player	New team	Term	Via	Ref
July 1, 2024	Laurent Brossoit	Chicago Blackhawks	2-year	Free agency	
July 1, 2024	Kyle Capobianco	Dallas Stars	2-year	Free agency	
July 1, 2024	Collin Delia	Edmonton Oilers	1-year	Free agency	
July 1, 2024	Brenden Dillon	New Jersey Devils	3-year	Free agency	
July 1, 2024	Jeff Malott	Los Angeles Kings	2-year	Free agency	
July 1, 2024	Sean Monahan	Columbus Blue Jackets	5-year	Free agency	
July 1, 2024	Tyler Toffoli	San Jose Sharks	4-year	Free agency	
July 1, 2024	Jeffrey Viel	Boston Bruins	2-year	Free agency	
July 2, 2024	Nate Schmidt	Florida Panthers	1-year	Free agency	
October 11, 2024	Kaapo Kahkonen			Waivers	
October 20, 2024	Bryan Little			Retirement	

=== Signings ===
Date	Player	Term	Ref
July 1, 2024	Colin Miller	1-year	
July 6, 2024	David Gustafsson	2-year	
July 6, 2024	Logan Stanley	2-year	
July 12, 2024	Dylan Coghlan	1-year	
July 15, 2024	Ville Heinola	2-year	
July 26, 2024	Simon Lundmark	1-year	
September 23, 2024	Cole Perfetti	2-year	
October 20, 2024	Bryan Little	1-day	
December 17, 2024	Kevin He	3-year†	
March 6, 2025	Jacob Julien	3-year†	
April 7, 2025	Kieron Walton	3-year†	

== Draft picks ==
Below are the Winnipeg Jets' selections at the 2024 NHL entry draft, which was held on June 28 to 29, 2024, at Sphere in Paradise, Nevada.

Round	#	Player	Pos.	Nationality	Team (League)
2	37	Alfons Freij	D	Sweden	IF Björklöven (HockeyAllsvenskan)
4	109	Kevin He	LW	China	Niagara IceDogs (OHL)
5	155	Markus Loponen	C	Finland	Oulun Kärpät (Liiga)
6	187	Kieron Walton	C	Canada	Sudbury Wolves (OHL)
