= 2024–25 Anaheim Ducks season =

National Hockey League season

2024–25 Anaheim Ducks
- Division: 6th Pacific
- Conference: 12th Western
- 2024–25 record: 35–37–10
- Home record: 21–18–2
- Road record: 14–19–8
- Goals for: 221
- Goals against: 263

Team information
- General manager: Pat Verbeek
- Coach: Greg Cronin
- Captain: Radko Gudas
- Alternate captains: Cam Fowler (Oct. 12 – Dec. 14); Alex Killorn; Ryan Strome (Dec. 14 – Apr. 16)
- Arena: Honda Center
- Average attendance: 15,806
- Minor league affiliates: San Diego Gulls (AHL); Tulsa Oilers (ECHL)

Team leaders
- Goals: Mason McTavish (22)
- Assists: Troy Terry (34)
- Points: Troy Terry (54)
- Penalty minutes: Radko Gudas (84)
- Plus/minus: Alex Killorn (+13)
- Wins: Lukas Dostal (23)
- Goals against average: John Gibson (2.77)

The 2024–25 Anaheim Ducks season was the 32nd season of operation, and the 31st season of play, for the National Hockey League (NHL) franchise that was established on June 15, 1993.

On April 3, 2025, the Ducks were eliminated from playoff contention for the seventh consecutive season following a loss to the Calgary Flames.

== Off-season ==
=== Rebrand ===
During the 2024 offseason, the Anaheim Ducks underwent a major rebrand. After teasing their new logo starting on June 14, on June 24 the Ducks released their new logo. The new logo was heavily influenced by their "Mighty Ducks" branding, but color was modernized with the jade and eggplant replaced by orange and gold, with the new branding catering to "Orange Country," in reference to Orange County and the surrounding area's history of growing oranges. The former webbed-duck foot logo was retained as a secondary logo and a shoulder pad patch.

=== Broadcasting change ===
In late August, during the offseason, the Anaheim Ducks announced that they would not renew their contract with Bally Sports SoCal & West and its parent Diamond Sports Group as its regional broadcaster. The Ducks instead signed a two-year deal with A Parent Media Company's Victory+, a streaming service which started after a contract between APMC and the Dallas Stars. Ducks fans across its broadcasting market will be able to watch games through the streaming service, which is available on televisions, phones and other streaming devices. Along with the streaming option, 65 games held by Victory+ (not on TNT, ESPN or their associated networks) will also be broadcast by over-the-air network KCOP-TV in Southern California.

== Standings ==
=== Divisional standings ===
Pacific Division
Pos	Team	GP	W	L	OTL	RW	GF	GA	GD	Pts
1	y – Vegas Golden Knights	82	50	22	10	46	275	219	+56	110
2	x – Los Angeles Kings	82	48	25	9	43	250	206	+44	105
3	x – Edmonton Oilers	82	48	29	5	36	259	236	+23	101
4	Calgary Flames	82	41	27	14	31	225	238	−13	96
5	Vancouver Canucks	82	38	30	14	28	236	253	−17	90
6	Anaheim Ducks	82	35	37	10	24	221	263	−42	80
7	Seattle Kraken	82	35	41	6	28	247	265	−18	76
8	San Jose Sharks	82	20	50	12	14	210	315	−105	52

Source: National Hockey League
Rules for classification: 1) Fewer number of games played (GP, only during regular season); 2) Greater number of regulation wins (RW); 3) Greater number of wins in regulation and overtime, excluding shootout wins (ROW); 4) Greater number of total wins, including shootouts (W); 5) Greater number of points earned in head-to-head play; if teams played an uneven number of head-to-head games, the result of the first game on the home ice of the team with the extra home game is discarded; 6) Greater goal differential (GD); 7) Greater number of goals scored (GF)
x – Clinched playoff spot; y – Clinched division

=== Conference standings ===
Western Conference Wild Card
Pos	Div	Team	GP	W	L	OTL	RW	GF	GA	GD	Pts
1	CE	x – Minnesota Wild	82	45	30	7	33	228	239	−11	97
2	CE	x – St. Louis Blues	82	44	30	8	32	254	233	+21	96
3	PA	Calgary Flames	82	41	27	14	31	225	238	−13	96
4	PA	Vancouver Canucks	82	38	30	14	28	236	253	−17	90
5	CE	Utah Hockey Club	82	38	31	13	30	241	251	−10	89
6	PA	Anaheim Ducks	82	35	37	10	24	221	263	−42	80
7	PA	Seattle Kraken	82	35	41	6	28	247	265	−18	76
8	CE	Nashville Predators	82	30	44	8	24	214	274	−60	68
9	CE	Chicago Blackhawks	82	25	46	11	20	226	296	−70	61
10	PA	San Jose Sharks	82	20	50	12	14	210	315	−105	52

Source: National Hockey League
Rules for classification: 1) Fewer number of games played (GP, only during regular season); 2) Greater number of regulation wins (RW); 3) Greater number of wins in regulation and overtime, excluding shootout wins (ROW); 4) Greater number of total wins, including shootouts (W); 5) Greater number of points earned in head-to-head play; if teams played an uneven number of head-to-head games, the result of the first game on the home ice of the team with the extra home game is discarded; 6) Greater goal differential (GD); 7) Greater number of goals scored (GF)
x – Clinched playoff spot

== Schedule and results ==
=== Preseason ===
The Anaheim Ducks preseason schedule was released on June 20, 2024.

2024 preseason game log: 3–2–1 (Home: 2–1–1; Road: 1–1–0)

#	Date	Visitor	Score	Home	OT	Decision	Location	Attendance	Record
1	September 24	Anaheim	4–3	San Jose		Dansk (1–0–0)	SAP Center	9,462	1–0–0
2	September 26	San Jose	3–2	Anaheim	OT	Clang (0–0–1)	Honda Center	10,683	1–0–1
3^{A}	September 28	Anaheim	2–3	Los Angeles		Dostal (0–1–0)	Toyota Arena	9,631	1–1–1
4	September 30	Los Angeles	4–0	Anaheim		Dansk (1–1–0)	Honda Center	10,574	1–2–1
5	October 2	Utah	2–5	Anaheim		Dostal (1–1–0)	Honda Center	10,338	2–2–1
6	October 4	Anaheim	3–2	San Jose	SO	Dostal (2–1–0)	SAP Center	9,552	3–2–1

Legend:

= Win = Loss = OT/SO Loss ^{A} – Game played in Ontario, California

=== Regular season ===
The Anaheim Ducks regular season schedule was released on July 2, 2024.

2024–25 game log
October: 4–4–2 (Home: 2–1–0; Road: 2–3–2)

#	Date	Visitor	Score	Home	OT	Decision	Location	Attendance	Record	Points	Recap
1	October 12	Anaheim	2–0	San Jose		Dostal (1–0–0)	SAP Center	17,016	1–0–0	2	
2	October 13	Anaheim	1–3	Vegas		Reimer (0–1–0)	T-Mobile Arena	18,027	1–1–0	2	
3	October 16	Utah	4–5	Anaheim	OT	Dostal (2–0–0)	Honda Center	17,245	2–1–0	4	
4	October 18	Anaheim	3–4	Colorado	OT	Dostal (2–0–1)	Ball Arena	18,071	2–1–1	5	
5	October 20	Los Angeles	4–1	Anaheim		Dostal (2–1–1)	Honda Center	16,098	2–2–1	5	
6	October 22	San Jose	1–3	Anaheim		Dostal (3–1–1)	Honda Center	17,174	3–2–1	7	
7	October 26	Anaheim	1–2	NY Rangers		Dostal (3–2–1)	Madison Square Garden	18,006	3–3–1	7	
8	October 27	Anaheim	2–6	New Jersey		Reimer (0–2–0)	Prudential Center	14,344	3–4–1	7	
9	October 29	Anaheim	3–1	NY Islanders		Dostal (4–2–1)	UBS Arena	14,234	4–4–1	9	
10	October 31	Anaheim	1–2	Pittsburgh	OT	Dostal (4–2–2)	PPG Paints Arena	14,945	4–4–2	10	

November: 5–6–1 (Home: 2–6–1; Road: 3–0–0)

#	Date	Visitor	Score	Home	OT	Decision	Location	Attendance	Record	Points	Recap
11	November 3	Chicago	4–2	Anaheim		Dostal (4–3–2)	Honda Center	16,352	4–5–2	10	
12	November 5	Vancouver	5–1	Anaheim		Dostal (4–4–2)	Honda Center	13,538	4–6–2	10	
13	November 8	Minnesota	5–2	Anaheim		Dostal (4–5–2)	Honda Center	14,706	4–7–2	10	
14	November 10	Columbus	2–4	Anaheim		Gibson (1–0–0)	Honda Center	16,153	5–7–2	12	
15	November 13	Vegas	3–2	Anaheim		Dostal (4–6–2)	Honda Center	13,153	5–8–2	12	
16	November 15	Detroit	4–6	Anaheim		Gibson (2–0–0)	Honda Center	14,154	6–8–2	14	
17	November 18	Anaheim	4–2	Dallas		Dostal (5–6–2)	American Airlines Center	18,532	7–8–2	16	
18	November 19	Anaheim	3–2	Chicago		Gibson (3–0–0)	United Center	17,712	8–8–2	18	
19	November 22	Buffalo	3–2	Anaheim	OT	Gibson (3–0–1)	Honda Center	13,776	8–8–3	19	
20	November 25	Seattle	3–2	Anaheim		Dostal (5–7–2)	Honda Center	15,331	8–9–3	19	
21	November 27	Anaheim	5–2	Seattle		Gibson (4–0–1)	Climate Pledge Arena	17,151	9–9–3	21	
22	November 29	Los Angeles	2–1	Anaheim		Gibson (4–1–1)	Honda Center	17,174	9–10–3	21	

December: 6–7–1 (Home: 4–4–0; Road: 2–3–1)

#	Date	Visitor	Score	Home	OT	Decision	Location	Attendance	Record	PointsC Ac	Recap
23	December 1	Ottawa	3–4	Anaheim	SO	Dostal (6–7–2)	Honda Center	15,144	10–10–3	23	
24	December 4	Vegas	4–1	Anaheim		Gibson (4–2–1)	Honda Center	13,188	10–11–3	23	
25	December 6	Minnesota	5–1	Anaheim		Gibson (4–3–1)	Honda Center	15,171	10–12–3	23	
26	December 9	Anaheim	2–3	Montreal	SO	Dostal (6–7–3)	Bell Centre	21,105	10–12–4	24	
27	December 11	Anaheim	1–5	Ottawa		Gibson (4–4–1)	Canadian Tire Centre	16,893	10–13–4	24	
28	December 12	Anaheim	2–3	Toronto		Dostal (6–8–3)	Scotiabank Arena	18,688	10–14–4	24	
29	December 14	Anaheim	4–3	Columbus	OT	Gibson (5–4–1)	Nationwide Arena	17,663	11–14–4	26	
30	December 18	Winnipeg	2–3	Anaheim		Dostal (7–8–3)	Honda Center	16,260	12–14–4	28	
31	December 20	Colorado	4–2	Anaheim		Gibson (5–5–1)	Honda Center	16,226	12–15–4	28	
32	December 22	Anaheim	5–4	Utah	SO	Dostal (8–8–3)	Delta Center	11,131	13–15–4	30	
33	December 23	Anaheim	1–3	Vegas		Dostal (8–9–3)	T-Mobile Arena	18,009	13–16–4	30	
34	December 28	Philadelphia	3–1	Anaheim		Dostal (8–10–3)	Honda Center	16,472	13–17–4	30	
35	December 29	Edmonton	3–5	Anaheim		Dostal (9–10–3)	Honda Center	16,010	14–17–4	32	
36	December 31	New Jersey	2–3	Anaheim		Dostal (10–10–3)	Honda Center	17,174	15–17–4	34	

January: 6–7–2 (Home: 3–1–1; Road: 3–6–1)

#	Date	Visitor	Score	Home	OT	Decision	Location	Attendance	Record	Points	Recap
37	January 2	Anaheim	4–3	Winnipeg	OT	Gibson (6–5–1)	Canada Life Centre	15,225	16–17–4	36	
38	January 3	Anaheim	2–3	Edmonton		Dostal (10–11–3)	Rogers Place	18,347	16–18–4	36	
39	January 5	Tampa Bay	1–4	Anaheim		Gibson (7–5–1)	Honda Center	14,208	17–18–4	38	
40	January 7	Calgary	3–2	Anaheim	OT	Gibson (7–5–2)	Honda Center	17,396	17–18–5	39	
41	January 9	Anaheim	2–6	St. Louis		Dostal (10–12–3)	Enterprise Center	17,176	17–19–5	39	
42	January 11	Anaheim	0–6	Philadelphia		Gibson (7–6–2)	Wells Fargo Center	19,154	17–20–5	39	
43	January 12	Anaheim	3–2	Carolina	OT	Dostal (11–12–3)	Lenovo Center	18,897	18–20–5	41	
44	January 14	Anaheim	0–3	Washington		Gibson (7–7–2)	Capital One Arena	18,573	18–21–5	41	
45	January 16	Anaheim	3–4	Tampa Bay	SO	Dostal (11–12–4)	Amalie Arena	19,092	18–21–6	42	
46	January 18	Anaheim	0–3	Florida		Gibson (7–8–2)	Amerant Bank Arena	19,395	18–22–6	42	
47	January 21	Florida	5–2	Anaheim		Dostal (11–13–4)	Honda Center	14,694	18–23–6	42	
48	January 23	Pittsburgh	1–5	Anaheim		Gibson (8–8–2)	Honda Center	15,330	19–23–6	44	
49	January 25	Nashville	2–5	Anaheim		Dostal (12–13–4)	Honda Center	15,748	20–23–6	46	
50	January 28	Anaheim	6–4	Seattle		Dostal (13–13–4)	Climate Pledge Arena	17,151	21–23–6	48	
51	January 30	Anaheim	1–4	Calgary		Gibson (8–9–2)	Scotiabank Saddledome	17,123	21–24–6	48	

February: 5–1–1 (Home: 3–0–0; Road: 2–1–1)

#	Date	Visitor	Score	Home	OT	Decision	Location	Attendance	Record	Points	Recap
52	February 2	Montreal	2–3	Anaheim		Dostal (14–13–4)	Honda Center	17,174	22–24–6	50	
53	February 4	Dallas	1–2	Anaheim		Gibson (9–9–3)	Honda Center	16,714	23–24–6	52	
54	February 8	Anaheim	2–1	Los Angeles	SO	Dostal (15–13–4)	Crypto.com Arena	18,145	24–24–6	54	
February 12–20		4 Nations Face-Off (United States) (Canada) (Sweden) (Finland); Winner: (Canada)					TD Garden, Boston • Bell Centre, Montreal				
55	February 22	Anaheim	3–2	Boston	OT	Dostal (16–13–4)	TD Garden	17,850	25–24–6	56	
56	February 23	Anaheim	4–5	Detroit	OT	Dostal (16–13–5)	Little Caesars Arena	19,515	25–24–7	57	
57	February 25	Anaheim	2–3	Buffalo		Dostal (16–14–5)	KeyBank Center	13,921	25–25–7	57	
58	February 27	Vancouver	2–5	Anaheim		Dostal (17–14–5)	Honda Center	17,174	26–25–7	59	

March: 6–7–1 (Home: 4–4–0; Road: 2–3–1)

#	Date	Visitor	Score	Home	OT	Decision	Location	Attendance	Record	Points	Recap
59	March 1	Chicago	6–3	Anaheim		Gibson (9–10–3)	Honda Center	17,174	26–26–7	59	
60	March 4	Anaheim	6–2	Edmonton		Dostal (18–14–5)	Rogers Place	18,347	27–26–7	61	
61	March 5	Anaheim	2–3	Vancouver		Dostal (18–15–5)	Rogers Arena	18,865	27–27–7	61	
62	March 7	St. Louis	4–3	Anaheim		Dostal (18–16–5)	Honda Center	15,596	27–28–7	61	
63	March 9	NY Islanders	1–4	Anaheim		Dostal (19–16–5)	Honda Center	17,174	28–28–7	63	
64	March 11	Washington	7–4	Anaheim		Dostal (19–17–5)	Honda Center	16,507	28–29–7	63	
65	March 12	Anaheim	2–3	Utah		Husso (0–1–0)	Delta Center	11,131	28–30–7	63	
66	March 14	Nashville	1–2	Anaheim		Dostal (20–17–5)	Honda Center	14,758	29–30–7	65	
67	March 16	Anaheim	2–7	St. Louis		Dostal (20–18–5)	Enterprise Center	17,735	29–31–7	65	
68	March 18	Anaheim	3–4	Dallas	OT	Dostal (20–18–6)	American Airlines Center	18,532	29–31–8	66	
69	March 20	Anaheim	4–1	Nashville		Gibson (10–10–3)	Bridgestone Arena	17,159	30–31–8	68	
70	March 23	Carolina	5–2	Anaheim		Dostal (20–19–6)	Honda Center	16,439	30–32–8	68	
71	March 26	Boston	2–6	Anaheim		Gibson (11–10–3)	Honda Center	16,387	31–32–8	70	
72	March 28	NY Rangers	4–5	Anaheim	OT	Dostal (21–19–6)	Honda Center	16,197	32–32–8	72	
73	March 30	Toronto	3–2	Anaheim		Dostal (21–20–6)	Honda Center	17,174	32–33–8	72	

April: 3–4–2 (Home: 3–1–0; Road: 0–3–2)

#	Date	Visitor	Score	Home	OT	Decision	Location	Attendance	Record	Points	Recap
74	April 1	San Jose	3–4	Anaheim	SO	Dostal (22–20–6)	Honda Center	15,208	33–33–8	74	
75	April 3	Anaheim	1–4	Calgary		Gibson (11–11–2)	Scotiabank Saddledome	17,174	33–34–8	74	
76	April 5	Anaheim	2–6	Vancouver		Dostal (22–21–6)	Rogers Arena	18,914	33–35–8	74	
77	April 7	Edmonton	2–3	Anaheim		Dostal (23–21–6)	Honda Center	14,128	34–35–8	76	
78	April 9	Calgary	3–4	Anaheim	OT	Husso (1–1–0)	Honda Center	15,134	35–35–8	78	
79	April 10	Anaheim	1–6	Los Angeles		Dostal (23–22–6)	Crypto.com Arena	18,145	35–36–8	78	
80	April 13	Colorado	4–2	Anaheim		Dostal (23–23–6)	Honda Center	17,241	35–37–8	78	
81	April 15	Anaheim	2–3	Minnesota	OT	Dostal (23–23–7)	Xcel Energy Center	19,029	35–37–9	79	
82	April 16	Anaheim	1–2	Winnipeg	OT	Husso (1–1–1)	Canada Life Centre	15,225	35–37–10	80	

Legend: Win Loss OT/SO Loss

== Player stats ==
As of end of the season

=== Skaters ===
Regular season
Player	GP	G	A	Pts	+/−	PIM
Troy Terry	77	21	34	55	0	20
Mason McTavish	76	22	30	52	0	38
Frank Vatrano	81	21	24	45	−9	80
Leo Carlsson	76	20	25	45	+6	14
Cutter Gauthier	82	20	24	44	+8	20
Jackson LaCombe	75	14	29	43	0	28
Ryan Strome	82	10	31	41	−3	70
Alex Killorn	82	19	18	37	+12	30
Trevor Zegras	57	12	20	32	−8	23
Olen Zellweger	62	7	13	20	+1	20
Pavel Mintyukov	68	5	14	19	−4	20
Brett Leason	61	5	12	17	−1	22
Brian Dumoulin^{‡}	61	2	14	16	+1	10
Radko Gudas	81	1	15	16	+4	86
Robby Fabbri	44	8	8	16	−6	20
Isac Lundestrom	79	4	11	15	−12	10
Drew Helleson	56	4	9	13	+6	47
Sam Colangelo	32	10	2	12	−4	2
Brock McGinn	26	4	4	8	+1	0
Jacob Trouba^{†}	53	1	7	8	−5	44
Jansen Harkins	63	2	4	6	−13	21
Nikita Nesterenko	20	4	2	6	−4	2
Ross Johnston	43	1	3	4	−2	72
Cam Fowler^{‡}	17	0	4	4	−7	6
Ian Moore	3	0	1	1	+1	0
Urho Vaakanainen^{‡}	5	0	1	1	0	2
Oliver Kylington^{†}	6	0	1	1	+1	4
Tristan Luneau	6	0	0	0	−5	2
Tim Washe	2	0	0	0	0	0

=== Goaltenders ===
Regular season
Player	GP	GS	TOI	W	L	OT	GA	GAA	SA	SV%	SO	G	A	PIM
Lukas Dostal	54	49	3057:39	23	23	7	158	3.10	1625	.903	1	0	0	0
John Gibson	29	28	1562:09	11	11	2	72	2.77	785	.912	0	0	1	4
Ville Husso†	4	3	200:57	1	1	1	10	2.99	134	.925	0	0	0	0
James Reimer‡	2	2	120:00	0	2	0	9	4.50	66	.864	0	0	0	0

^{†}Denotes player spent time with another team before joining the Ducks. Stats reflect time with the Ducks only.
^{‡}Denotes player was traded mid-season. Stats reflect time with the Ducks only.

== Transactions ==
The Ducks have been involved in the following transactions during the 2024–25 season.

=== Key ===
† Entry-Level Contract ‡ Contract initially takes effect in the 2025–26 season.

=== Trades ===
Date	Details		Ref
July 2, 2024	To Seattle Kraken 4th-round pick in 2026	To Anaheim Ducks Brian Dumoulin	
July 3, 2024	To Detroit Red Wings Gage Alexander	To Anaheim Ducks Robby Fabbri conditional 4th-round pick in 2025^{1}	
December 6, 2024	To New York Rangers Urho Vaakanainen conditional 4th-round pick in 2025^{2}	To Anaheim Ducks Jacob Trouba	
December 14, 2024	To St. Louis Blues Cam Fowler^{3} 4th-round pick in 2027	To Anaheim Ducks Jeremie Biakabutuka; 2nd-round pick in 2027	
January 22, 2025	To San Jose Sharks Pavol Regenda	To Anaheim Ducks Justin Bailey	
February 24, 2025	To Detroit Red Wings Future considerations	To Anaheim Ducks Ville Husso	
March 6, 2025	To New Jersey Devils Brian Dumoulin^{4}	To Anaheim Ducks Rights to Herman Traff conditional 2nd-round pick in 2025^{5}	
March 7, 2025	To New York Islanders future considerations	To Anaheim Ducks Oliver Kylington	
June 12, 2025	To New York Rangers Carey Terrance; TOR 3rd-round pick in 2025	To Anaheim Ducks Chris Kreider; ANA 4th-round pick in 2025	
June 23, 2025	To Philadelphia Flyers Trevor Zegras	To Anaheim Ducks Ryan Poehling; CBJ 2nd-round pick in 2025; 4th-round pick in 2026	
June 28, 2025	To Detroit Red Wings John Gibson	To Anaheim Ducks Petr Mrazek; 4th-round pick in 2026; 2nd-round pick in 2027	

==== Notes ====
1. Anaheim will receive either Boston's 4th-round pick or Detroit's 4th-round pick.
2. New York will receive the later of Anaheim's 4th-round pick or Boston's 4th-round pick or the earlier of Detroit's 4th-round pick.
3. Anaheim retains 38.5% of Fowler's remaining salary.
4. Anaheim retains 50% of Dumoulin's remaining salary.
5. Anaheim will receive the earlier of Edmonton's 2nd-round pick or Winnipeg's 2nd-round pick.

=== Players acquired ===
Date	Player	Former team	Term	Via	Ref
July 2, 2024	Jansen Harkins	Pittsburgh Penguins	2-year	Free agency	
July 3, 2024	Carson Meyer	Columbus Blue Jackets	1-year	Free agency	
September 5, 2024	Oscar Dansk	Calgary Flames	1-year	Free agency	
October 7, 2024	James Reimer	Buffalo Sabres		Waivers	

=== Players lost ===
Date	Player	New team	Term	Via	Ref
July 1, 2024	Glenn Gawdin	Los Angeles Kings	2-year	Free agency	
July 1, 2024	Max Jones	Boston Bruins	2-year	Free agency	
July 1, 2024	William Lagesson	Detroit Red Wings	1-year	Free agency	
July 1, 2024	Ben Meyers	Seattle Kraken	1-year	Free agency	
July 1, 2024	Colton White	New Jersey Devils	2-year	Free agency	
July 2, 2024	Andrew Agozzino	Utah Hockey Club	2-year	Free agency	
July 2, 2024	Trevor Carrick	Charlotte Checkers (AHL)	2-year	Free agency	
July 2, 2024	Benoit-Olivier Groulx	New York Rangers	1-year	Free agency	
July 4, 2024	Robert Hagg	Vegas Golden Knights	1-year	Free agency	
August 13, 2024	Blake McLaughlin	Hartford Wolf Pack (AHL)	1-year	Free agency	
September 7, 2024	Chase De Leo	Barys Astana (KHL)	1-year	Free agency	
October 9, 2024	Gustav Lindstrom	Montreal Canadiens	1-year	Free agency	
November 13, 2024	James Reimer	Buffalo Sabres		Waivers	
December 7, 2024	Brayden Tracey	Mikkelin Jukurit (Liiga)	1-year	Free agency	

=== Retirement ===
Date	Player	Ref
September 12, 2024	Alex Stalock	

=== Signings ===
Date	Player	Term	Ref
July 1, 2024	Brett Leason	1-year	
July 1, 2024	Urho Vaakanainen	1-year	
July 6, 2024	Pavol Regenda	1-year	
July 6, 2024	Beckett Sennecke	3-year†	
July 6, 2024	Stian Solberg	3-year†	
July 15, 2024	Jackson LaCombe	2-year	
July 15, 2024	Nikita Nesterenko	1-year	
January 5, 2025	Frank Vatrano	3-year‡	
April 9, 2025	Carey Terrance	3-year†‡	
April 12, 2025	Ian Moore	2-year†	
April 14, 2025	Tim Washe	1-year†	
April 15, 2025	Konnor Smith	3-year†‡	
June 13, 2025	Lucas Pettersson	3-year†‡	
June 18, 2025	Nikita Nesterenko	2-year‡	
June 29, 2025	Ville Husso	2-year‡	

== Draft picks ==
Below are the Anaheim Ducks selections at the 2024 NHL entry draft, which was held on June 28 and 29, 2024, at the Sphere in Las Vegas, Nevada.

Round	#	Player	Pos	Nationality	College/Junior/Club team (League)
1	3	Beckett Sennecke	RW	Canada	Oshawa Generals (OHL)
1	23 (Note: The Toronto Maple Leafs' first-round pick went to the Anaheim Ducks as the result of a trade on June 28, 2024, that sent Edmonton's first-round pick 2024 (31st overall) and Boston's second-round pick in 2024 (58th overall) to Toronto in exchange for this pick.)	Stian Solberg	D	Norway	Vålerenga Ishockey (EliteHockey Ligaen)
2	35	Lucas Pettersson	C	Sweden	Modo Hockey (J20 Nationell)
3	66 (Note: The San Jose Sharks' third-round pick went to the Anaheim Ducks as the result of a trade on February 28, 2023, that sent Henry Thrun to San Jose in exchange for this pick.)	Maxim Masse	RW	Canada	Chicoutimi Saguenéens (QMJHL)
3	68	Ethan Procyszyn	C	Canada	North Bay Battalion (OHL)
3	79 (Note: The Pittsburgh Penguins' third-round pick went to the Anaheim Ducks as the result of a trade on March 3, 2023, that sent Dmitry Kulikov to Pittsburgh in exchange for Brock McGinn and this pick.)	Tarin Smith	D	Canada	Everett Silvertips (WHL)
4	100	Alexandre Blais	C	Canada	Rimouski Océanic (QMJHL)
6	182 (Note: The Los Angeles Kings' sixth-round pick will go to the Anaheim Ducks as the result of a trade on June 29, 2024, that sent a sixth-round pick in 2024 (164th overall) to Los Angeles in exchange for a seventh-round pick in 2024 (214th overall) and this pick.)	Austin Burnevik	RW	United States	Madison Capitols (USHL)
7	214 (Note: The Los Angeles Kings' sixth-round pick will go to the Anaheim Ducks as the result of a trade on June 29, 2024, that sent a sixth-round pick in 2024 (164th overall) to Los Angeles in exchange for a seventh-round pick in 2024 (214th overall) and this pick.)	Darels Uljanskis	D	Latvia	AIK IF (J20 Nationell)
