= 2024–25 Utah Hockey Club season =

National Hockey League season

2024–25 Utah Hockey Club
- Division: 6th Central
- Conference: 11th Western
- 2024–25 record: 38–31–13
- Home record: 18–15–8
- Road record: 20–16–5
- Goals for: 241
- Goals against: 251

Team information
- General manager: Bill Armstrong
- Coach: André Tourigny
- Captain: Clayton Keller
- Alternate captains: Lawson Crouse; Alexander Kerfoot (Nov. – Apr. 15); Nick Schmaltz (Oct. – Nov.); Mikhail Sergachev (Nov. – Apr. 15)
- Arena: Delta Center
- Average attendance: 11,131
- Minor league affiliates: Tucson Roadrunners (AHL); Allen Americans (ECHL)

Team leaders
- Goals: Clayton Keller (30)
- Assists: Clayton Keller (60)
- Points: Clayton Keller (90)
- Penalty minutes: Michael Kesselring (89)
- Plus/minus: Jack McBain (+8)
- Wins: Karel Vejmelka (26)
- Goals against average: Karel Vejmelka (2.58)

The 2024–25 Utah Hockey Club season was the inaugural season for the National Hockey League (NHL) franchise. They played their home games at the Delta Center, shared with the Utah Jazz of the National Basketball Association (NBA).

As part of a deal that rendered the Arizona Coyotes an inactive franchise, Utah was established with the existing roster, staff, and draft picks of the said franchise, in a similar move to the 1995 Cleveland Browns relocation controversy that established the Baltimore Ravens. For this season the team chose to use a generic Utah Hockey Club name until a permanent name was chosen.

With a win against the San Jose Sharks on December 14, 2024, the team became the first NHL expansion franchise to win six consecutive away games in their first year. They also broke the record for longest road win streak by an expansion franchise in its first season at seven consecutive games, passing the Minnesota North Stars' five-game road win streak in 1967–68.

They also equaled the Vegas Golden Knights by winning each of their first three games as a franchise, also an NHL record. Their 38 wins also was the second-most ever by an NHL expansion franchise, only behind Vegas with 51 in their inaugural season.

Despite these accomplishments, the team was eliminated from playoff contention on April 9, 2025, after the Minnesota Wild defeated the San Jose Sharks in overtime.

After the season, the team changed its name to the Utah Mammoth.

== Standings ==
=== Divisional standings ===
Central Division
Pos	Team	GP	W	L	OTL	RW	GF	GA	GD	Pts
1	p – Winnipeg Jets	82	56	22	4	43	277	191	+86	116
2	x – Dallas Stars	82	50	26	6	41	277	224	+53	106
3	x – Colorado Avalanche	82	49	29	4	40	277	234	+43	102
4	x – Minnesota Wild	82	45	30	7	33	228	239	−11	97
5	x – St. Louis Blues	82	44	30	8	32	254	233	+21	96
6	Utah Hockey Club	82	38	31	13	30	241	251	−10	89
7	Nashville Predators	82	30	44	8	24	214	274	−60	68
8	Chicago Blackhawks	82	25	46	11	20	226	296	−70	61

Source: National Hockey League
Rules for classification: 1) Fewer number of games played (GP, only during regular season); 2) Greater number of regulation wins (RW); 3) Greater number of wins in regulation and overtime, excluding shootout wins (ROW); 4) Greater number of total wins, including shootouts (W); 5) Greater number of points earned in head-to-head play; if teams played an uneven number of head-to-head games, the result of the first game on the home ice of the team with the extra home game is discarded; 6) Greater goal differential (GD); 7) Greater number of goals scored (GF)
p – Clinched Presidents' Trophy; x – Clinched playoff spot

=== Conference standings ===
Western Conference Wild Card
Pos	Div	Team	GP	W	L	OTL	RW	GF	GA	GD	Pts
1	CE	x – Minnesota Wild	82	45	30	7	33	228	239	−11	97
2	CE	x – St. Louis Blues	82	44	30	8	32	254	233	+21	96
3	PA	Calgary Flames	82	41	27	14	31	225	238	−13	96
4	PA	Vancouver Canucks	82	38	30	14	28	236	253	−17	90
5	CE	Utah Hockey Club	82	38	31	13	30	241	251	−10	89
6	PA	Anaheim Ducks	82	35	37	10	24	221	263	−42	80
7	PA	Seattle Kraken	82	35	41	6	28	247	265	−18	76
8	CE	Nashville Predators	82	30	44	8	24	214	274	−60	68
9	CE	Chicago Blackhawks	82	25	46	11	20	226	296	−70	61
10	PA	San Jose Sharks	82	20	50	12	14	210	315	−105	52

Source: National Hockey League
Rules for classification: 1) Fewer number of games played (GP, only during regular season); 2) Greater number of regulation wins (RW); 3) Greater number of wins in regulation and overtime, excluding shootout wins (ROW); 4) Greater number of total wins, including shootouts (W); 5) Greater number of points earned in head-to-head play; if teams played an uneven number of head-to-head games, the result of the first game on the home ice of the team with the extra home game is discarded; 6) Greater goal differential (GD); 7) Greater number of goals scored (GF)
x – Clinched playoff spot

== Schedule and results ==
=== Preseason ===
The team's first preseason schedule was released on June 20, 2024.

2024 preseason game log: 5–2–0 (Home: 3–0–0; Road: 2–2–0)

#	Date	Visitor	Score	Home	OT	Decision	Location	Attendance	Record	Recap
1^{A}	September 22	St. Louis	3–5	Utah		Stauber	Wells Fargo Arena	8,851	1–0–0	
2	September 23	Los Angeles	2–3	Utah	OT	Villalta	Delta Center	11,131	2–0–0	
3	September 27	Utah	2–5	Vegas		Stauber	T-Mobile Arena	17,561	2–1–0	
4	September 29	Utah	6–3	Colorado		Vejmelka	Ball Arena	17,392	3–1–0	
5	October 1	Utah	3–1	San Jose		Ingram	SAP Center	8,562	4–1–0	
6	October 2	Utah	2–5	Anaheim		Vejmelka	Honda Center	10,338	4–2–0	
7^{B}	October 5	Colorado	1–2	Utah		Ingram	Maverik Center	—	5–2–0	

Legend: Win Loss OT/SO Loss
^{A} – Game played in Des Moines

^{B} – Game played in West Valley City

=== Regular season ===
The team's first regular season schedule was released on July 2, 2024.

2024–25 game log
October: 5–4–2 (Home: 3–2–1; Road: 2–2–1)

#	Date	Visitor	Score	Home	OT	Decision	Location	Attendance	Record	Points	Recap
1	October 8	Chicago	2–5	Utah		Ingram	Delta Center	11,131	1–0–0	2	
2	October 10	Utah	5–4	NY Islanders	OT	Ingram	UBS Arena	17,254	2–0–0	4	
3	October 12	Utah	6–5	NY Rangers	OT	Ingram	Madison Square Garden	18,006	3–0–0	6	
4	October 14	Utah	0–3	New Jersey		Vejmelka	Prudential Center	16,514	3–1–0	6	
5	October 16	Utah	4–5	Anaheim	OT	Ingram	Honda Center	17,245	3–1–1	7	
6	October 19	Boston	1–2	Utah	OT	Ingram	Delta Center	16,007	4–1–1	9	
7	October 22	Ottawa	4–0	Utah		Ingram	Delta Center	11,131	4–2–1	9	
8	October 24	Colorado	5–1	Utah		Vejmelka	Delta Center	11,131	4–3–1	9	
9	October 26	Utah	2–3	Los Angeles		Ingram	Crypto.com Arena	15,116	4–4–1	9	
10	October 28	San Jose	5–4	Utah	OT	Ingram	Delta Center	11,131	4–4–2	10	
11	October 30	Calgary	1–5	Utah		Ingram	Delta Center	11,131	5–4–2	12	

November: 5–6–2 (Home: 1–2–1; Road: 4–4–1)

#	Date	Visitor	Score	Home	OT	Decision	Location	Attendance	Record	Points	Recap
12	November 2	Utah	3–4	Vegas	OT	Ingram	T-Mobile Arena	18,216	5–4–3	13	
13	November 5	Utah	0–3	Winnipeg		Vejmelka	Canada Life Centre	12,932	5–5–3	13	
14	November 7	Utah	4–2	St. Louis		Ingram	Enterprise Center	17,528	6–5–3	15	
15	November 9	Utah	0–4	Nashville		Ingram	Bridgestone Arena	17,159	6–6–3	15	
16	November 13	Carolina	1–4	Utah		Vejmelka	Delta Center	11,131	7–6–3	17	
17	November 15	Vegas	4–2	Utah		Vejmelka	Delta Center	11,131	7–7–3	17	
18	November 18	Washington	6–2	Utah		Ingram	Delta Center	11,131	7–8–3	17	
19	November 21	Utah	0–1	Boston		Vejmelka	TD Garden	17,850	7–9–3	17	
20	November 23	Utah	6–1	Pittsburgh		Vejmelka	PPG Paints Arena	16,324	8–9–3	19	
21	November 24	Utah	2–3	Toronto		Vejmelka	Scotiabank Arena	18,641	8–10–3	19	
22	November 26	Utah	3–2	Montreal	OT	Vejmelka	Bell Centre	21,105	9–10–3	21	
23	November 29	Edmonton	4–3	Utah	OT	Vejmelka	Delta Center	11,131	9–10–4	22	
24	November 30	Utah	6–0	Vegas		Stauber	T-Mobile Arena	17,666	10–10–4	24	

December: 6–5–2 (Home: 1–3–2; Road: 5–2–0)

#	Date	Visitor	Score	Home	OT	Decision	Location	Attendance	Record	Points	Recap
25	December 2	Dallas	2–1	Utah		Vejmelka	Delta Center	11,131	10–11–4	24	
26	December 7	Utah	5–2	Buffalo		Vejmelka	KeyBank Center	15,071	11–11–4	26	
27	December 8	Utah	4–2	Philadelphia		Stauber	Wells Fargo Center	17,462	12–11–4	28	
28	December 10	Minnesota	5–4	Utah	SO	Vejmelka	Delta Center	11,131	12–11–5	29	
29	December 12	Utah	4–1	Colorado		Vejmelka	Ball Arena	18,031	13–11–5	31	
30	December 14	Utah	4–3	San Jose		Vejmelka	SAP Center	17,213	14–11–5	33	
31	December 18	Vancouver	2–3	Utah	OT	Vejmelka	Delta Center	11,131	15–11–5	35	
32	December 20	Utah	2–1	Minnesota		Vejmelka	Xcel Energy Center	18,088	16–11–5	37	
33	December 22	Anaheim	5–4	Utah	SO	Stauber	Delta Center	11,131	16–11–6	38	
34	December 23	Dallas	3–2	Utah		Vejmelka	Delta Center	11,131	16–12–6	38	
35	December 27	Colorado	4–1	Utah		Vejmelka	Delta Center	11,131	16–13–6	38	
36	December 30	Utah	2–5	Seattle		Vejmelka	Climate Pledge Arena	17,151	16–14–6	38	
37	December 31	Utah	1–4	Edmonton		Stauber	Rogers Place	18,347	16–15–6	38	

January: 5–6–3 (Home: 3–4–2; Road: 2–2–1)

#	Date	Visitor	Score	Home	OT	Decision	Location	Attendance	Record	Points	Recap
38	January 2	Utah	5–3	Calgary		Vejmelka	Scotiabank Saddledome	17,160	17–15–6	40	
39	January 4	Utah	2–3	Dallas	OT	Vejmelka	American Airlines Center	18,532	17–15–7	41	
40	January 8	Florida	4–1	Utah		Vejmelka	Delta Center	11,131	17–16–7	41	
41	January 10	San Jose	1–2	Utah		Vejmelka	Delta Center	11,131	18–16–7	43	
42	January 11	NY Islanders	2–1	Utah		Ingram	Delta Center	11,131	18–17–7	43	
43	January 14	Montreal	5–3	Utah		Vejmelka	Delta Center	11,131	18–18–7	43	
44	January 16	NY Rangers	5–3	Utah		Vejmelka	Delta Center	11,131	18–19–7	43	
45	January 18	St. Louis	2–4	Utah		Ingram	Delta Center	11,131	19–19–7	45	
46	January 20	Winnipeg	2–5	Utah		Ingram	Delta Center	11,131	20–19–7	47	
47	January 23	Utah	4–0	Minnesota		Vejmelka	Xcel Energy Center	18,071	21–19–7	49	
48	January 24	Utah	2–5	Winnipeg		Ingram	Canada Life Centre	13,878	21–20–7	49	
49	January 26	Utah	1–3	Ottawa		Vejmelka	Canadian Tire Centre	16,897	21–21–7	49	
50	January 29	Pittsburgh	3–2	Utah	OT	Ingram	Delta Center	11,131	21–21–8	50	
51	January 31	Columbus	3–2	Utah	OT	Vejmelka	Delta Center	11,131	21–21–9	51	

February: 6–3–0 (Home: 4–1–0; Road: 2–2–0)

#	Date	Visitor	Score	Home	OT	Decision	Location	Attendance	Record	Points	Recap
52	February 2	St. Louis	2–1	Utah		Ingram	Delta Center	11,131	21–22–9	51	
53	February 4	Philadelphia	2–3	Utah	OT	Vejmelka	Delta Center	11,131	22–22–9	53	
54	February 6	Utah	3–2	Columbus	OT	Ingram	Nationwide Arena	18,553	23–22–9	55	
55	February 8	Utah	3–7	Carolina		Vejmelka	Lenovo Center	19,005	23–23–9	55	
56	February 9	Utah	5–4	Washington	SO	Vejmelka	Capital One Arena	18,573	24–23–9	57	
57	February 22	Utah	3–5	Los Angeles		Ingram	Crypto.com Arena	18,145	24–24–9	57	
58	February 23	Vancouver	1–2	Utah		Vejmelka	Delta Center	11,131	25–24–9	59	
59	February 25	Chicago	1–2	Utah		Vejmelka	Delta Center	11,131	26–24–9	61	
60	February 27	Minnesota	1–6	Utah		Vejmelka	Delta Center	11,131	27–24–9	63	

March: 6–5–3 (Home: 3–2–1; Road: 3–3–2)

#	Date	Visitor	Score	Home	OT	Decision	Location	Attendance	Record	Points	Recap
61	March 1	New Jersey	3–1	Utah		Vejmelka	Delta Center	11,131	27–25–9	63	
62	March 6	Utah	4–2	Detroit		Vejmelka	Little Caesars Arena	19,515	28–25–9	65	
63	March 7	Utah	3–4	Chicago	OT	Vejmelka	United Center	19,414	28–25–10	66	
64	March 10	Toronto	4–3	Utah	SO	Vejmelka	Delta Center	11,131	28–25–11	67	
65	March 12	Anaheim	2–3	Utah		Vejmelka	Delta Center	11,131	29–25–11	69	
66	March 14	Utah	2–4	Seattle		Vejmelka	Climate Pledge Arena	17,151	29–26–11	69	
67	March 16	Utah	3–1	Vancouver		Vejmelka	Rogers Arena	18,804	30–26–11	71	
68	March 18	Utah	1–7	Edmonton		Stauber	Rogers Place	18,347	30–27–11	71	
69	March 20	Buffalo	2–5	Utah		Vejmelka	Delta Center	11,131	31–27–11	73	
70	March 22	Tampa Bay	4–6	Utah		Vejmelka	Delta Center	11,131	32–27–11	75	
71	March 24	Detroit	5–1	Utah		Vejmelka	Delta Center	11,131	32–28–11	75	
72	March 27	Utah	0–8	Tampa Bay		Vejmelka	Amalie Arena	19,092	32–29–11	75	
73	March 28	Utah	1–2	Florida	OT	Vejmelka	Amerant Bank Arena	19,549	32–29–12	76	
74	March 30	Utah	5–2	Chicago		Vejmelka	United Center	19,153	33–29–12	78	

April: 5–2–1 (Home: 3–1–1; Road: 2–1–0)

#	Date	Visitor	Score	Home	OT	Decision	Location	Attendance	Record	Points	Recap
75	April 1	Calgary	1–3	Utah		Vejmelka	Delta Center	11,131	34–29–12	80	
76	April 3	Los Angeles	4–2	Utah		Vejmelka	Delta Center	11,131	34–30–12	80	
77	April 5	Winnipeg	1–4	Utah		Vejmelka	Delta Center	11,131	35–30–12	82	
78	April 8	Seattle	1–7	Utah		Vejmelka	Delta Center	11,131	36–30–12	84	
79	April 10	Nashville	4–3	Utah	SO	Vejmelka	Delta Center	11,131	36–30–13	85	
80	April 12	Utah	5–3	Dallas		Vejmelka	American Airlines Center	18,532	37–30–13	87	
81	April 14	Utah	7–3	Nashville		Villalta	Bridgestone Arena	17,159	38–30–13	89	
82	April 15	Utah	1–6	St. Louis		Vejmelka	Enterprise Center	18,096	38–31–13	89	

Win (2 points) Loss (0 points) Overtime/shootout loss (1 point)

== Player statistics ==
Updated to game played on April 15, 2025

=== Skaters ===
Regular season
Player	GP	G	A	Pts	+/−	PIM
Clayton Keller	81	30	60	90	−12	28
Logan Cooley	75	25	40	65	+1	46
Nick Schmaltz	82	20	43	63	−15	14
Dylan Guenther	70	27	33	60	−4	26
Mikhail Sergachev	77	15	38	53	−8	32
Barrett Hayton	82	20	26	46	−6	45
Michael Kesselring	82	7	22	29	+4	89
Kevin Stenlund	82	14	14	28	−6	40
Alexander Kerfoot	81	11	17	28	−5	14
Jack McBain	82	13	14	27	+8	78
Nick Bjugstad	66	8	11	19	−2	16
Josh Doan	51	7	12	19	−2	8
Michael Carcone	53	7	12	19	−7	36
Lawson Crouse	81	12	6	18	−4	39
Matias Maccelli	55	8	10	18	−13	8
Olli Määttä^{†}	70	2	16	18	+7	16
Ian Cole	82	1	16	17	−2	77
John Marino	35	1	13	14	+1	2
Sean Durzi	30	4	7	11	+4	19
Nick DeSimone	20	1	5	6	+4	0
Vladislav Kolyachonok^{‡}	23	2	3	5	−7	2
Juuso Välimäki	43	2	3	5	−5	14
Kailer Yamamoto	12	2	1	3	−1	2
Maveric Lamoureux	15	1	2	3	+3	42
Robert Bortuzzo	17	0	2	2	−2	22
Liam O'Brien	28	0	2	2	+1	50
Dakota Mermis^{†‡}	1	0	0	0	−2	2

=== Goaltenders ===
Regular season
Player	GP	GS	TOI	W	L	OT	GA	GAA	SA	SV%	SO	G	A	PIM
Karel Vejmelka	58	55	3,368:20	26	22	8	145	2.58	1,509	.904	1	0	1	0
Connor Ingram	22	22	1,210:07	9	8	4	66	3.27	558	.882	0	0	2	4
Jaxson Stauber	6	4	313:11	2	1	1	17	3.26	158	.892	1	0	0	0
Matt Villalta	1	1	60:00	1	0	0	3	3.00	31	.903	0	0	0	0

^{†}Denotes player spent time with another team before joining Utah. Stats reflect time with Utah only.
^{‡}Denotes player was traded or waived mid-season. Stats reflect time with Utah only.

== Transactions ==
Utah have been involved in the following transactions during the 2024–25 season.

=== Key ===
† Contract is entry-level.
‡ Contract initially takes effect in the 2025–26 season.

=== Trades ===
Date	Details		Ref
June 29, 2024	To New Jersey Devils WSH 2nd-round pick in 2024; EDM 2nd-round pick in 2025	To Utah Hockey Club John Marino; COL 5th-round pick in 2024	
June 29, 2024	To Tampa Bay Lightning Conor Geekie; J. J. Moser; 7th-round pick in 2024; 2nd-round pick in 2025	To Utah Hockey Club Mikhail Sergachev	
July 3, 2024	To Ottawa Senators Jan Jeník	To Utah Hockey Club Egor Sokolov	
October 29, 2024	To Detroit Red Wings NYR 3rd-round pick in 2025	To Utah Hockey Club Olli Määttä	
February 3, 2025	To Minnesota Wild Future condsiderations	To Utah Hockey Club Sammy Walker	
March 7, 2025	To Chicago Blackhawks Aku Räty; Victor Söderström; Shea Weber	To Utah Hockey Club 5th-round pick in 2026	

=== Players acquired ===
Date	Player	Former team	Term	Via	Ref
July 1, 2024	Ian Cole	Vancouver Canucks	1-year	Free agency	
July 1, 2024	Kevin Connauton	Los Angeles Kings	2-year	Free agency	
July 1, 2024	Kevin Stenlund	Florida Panthers	2-year	Free agency	
July 2, 2024	Andrew Agozzino	Anaheim Ducks	2-year	Free agency	
July 5, 2024	Jaxson Stauber	Chicago Blackhawks	1-year	Free agency	
August 31, 2024	Robert Bortuzzo	New York Islanders	1-year	Free agency	
October 6, 2024	Kailer Yamamoto	Seattle Kraken	1-year	Free agency	
December 12, 2024	Dakota Mermis	Toronto Maple Leafs		Waivers	

=== Players lost ===
Date	Player	New team	Term	Via	Ref
July 1, 2024	Travis Boyd	Minnesota Wild	1-year	Free agency	
July 1, 2024	Josh Brown	Edmonton Oilers	3-year	Free agency	
July 1, 2024	Cameron Crotty	Minnesota Wild	1-year	Free agency	
July 1, 2024	Nathan Smith	Vancouver Canucks	1-year	Free agency	
July 3, 2024	Justin Kirkland	Calgary Flames	1-year	Free agency	
October 8, 2024	Travis Dermott	Edmonton Oilers	1-year	Free agency	
January 3, 2025	Dakota Mermis	Toronto Maple Leafs		Waivers	

=== Signings ===
Date	Player	Term	Ref
June 17, 2024	Noel Nordh	3-year†	
June 19, 2024	Matt Villalta	2-year	
June 20, 2024	Patrik Koch	1-year	
June 25, 2024	Vladislav Kolyachonok	2-year	
June 26, 2024	Liam O'Brien	3-year	
June 28, 2024	Michael Kesselring	2-year	
June 29, 2024	Juuso Välimäki	2-year	
June 30, 2024	Sean Durzi	4-year	
July 1, 2024	Miko Matikka	3-year†	
July 2, 2024	Travis Barron	1-year	
July 3, 2024	Milos Kelemen	1-year	
July 7, 2024	Curtis Douglas	2-year	
July 8, 2024	Barrett Hayton	2-year	
July 9, 2024	Egor Sokolov	1-year	
July 10, 2024	Artem Duda	3-year†	
July 11, 2024	Tij Iginla	3-year†	
July 22, 2024	Cole Beaudoin	3-year†	
September 20, 2024	Dylan Guenther	8-year‡	
October 18, 2024	Terrell Goldsmith	3-year†‡	
October 25, 2024	Owen Allard	3-year†	
Legend: † Contract is entry-level. ‡ Contract begins in 2025–26 season.

== Draft picks ==
Below are the Utah Hockey Club's selections at the 2024 NHL entry draft, which was held on June 28–29, 2024, at the Sphere in Paradise, Nevada.

Round	#	Player	Pos	Nationality	College/Junior/Club team (League)
1	6	Tij Iginla	C	Canada	Kelowna Rockets (WHL)
1	24 (Note: The Colorado Avalanche's first-round pick went to the Utah Hockey Club as the result of a trade on June 28, 2024, that sent a second and third-round pick both in 2024 (38th and 71st overall) and the NYR second-round pick in 2025 to Colorado in exchange for this pick.)	Cole Beaudoin	C	Canada	Barrie Colts (OHL)
2	65 (Note: The Florida Panthers' second-round pick went to Utah as a result of a trade on July 26, 2021, that sent a seventh-round pick in 2023 to Florida in exchange for Vladislav Kolyachonok, Anton Stralman and this pick.)	Will Skahan	D	United States	U.S. NTDP (USHL)
3	89 (Note: Colorado's third-round pick went to Utah as the result of a trade on July 28, 2021, that sent Darcy Kuemper to Colorado in exchange for Conor Timmins, a conditional first-round pick in 2022 and this pick (being conditional at the time of the trade). The condition – Arizona/Utah would receive a third-round pick in 2024 if Colorado wins the 2022 Stanley Cup and Kuemper plays in 50% or more of their playoff games – was converted on June 26, 2022.)	Thomas Lavoie	D	Canada	Val-d'Or Foreurs (QMJHL)
3	96 (Note: The Edmonton Oilers' third-round pick went to Utah as the result of a trade on July 7, 2022, that sent Colorado's first-round pick in 2022 to Edmonton in exchange for Zack Kassian, a first-round pick in 2022, a second-round pick in 2025 and this pick.)	Veeti Väisänen	D	Finland	KooKoo (Liiga)
4	98 (Note: The San Jose Sharks' fourth-round pick went to Utah as the result of a trade on July 28, 2021, that sent Lane Pederson to San Jose in exchange for this pick.)	Gregor Biber	D	Austria	Rögle BK (J20 Nationell)
4	103	Gabe Smith	C	Canada	Moncton Wildcats (QMJHL)
5	135	Owen Allard	C	Canada	Sault Ste. Marie Greyhounds (OHL)
5	153 (Note: Colorado's fifth-round pick will go to the Utah as the result of a trade on June 29, 2024, that sent WSH second-round pick in 2024 (49th overall) and Edmonton's second-round pick in 2025 to the New Jersey Devils in exchange for John Marino and this pick.)	Aleš Čech	D	Czech Republic	BK Mladá Boleslav (Czech Extraliga)
6	167	Vojtěch Hradec	C	Czech Republic	BK Mladá Boleslav (Czech Extraliga)
6	190 (Note: The Dallas Stars' sixth-round pick will go to Utah as the result of a trade on March 8, 2024, that sent Jason Zucker to the Nashville Predators in exchange for this pick.)	Ludvig Lafton	D	Norway	Färjestad BK (J20 Nationell)
