= 2024–25 Toronto Maple Leafs season =

National Hockey League season

2024–25 Toronto Maple Leafs
- Atlantic Division champions
- Division: 1st Atlantic
- Conference: 2nd Eastern
- 2024–25 record: 52–26–4
- Home record: 27–13–1
- Road record: 25–13–3
- Goals for: 268
- Goals against: 231

Team information
- General manager: Brad Treliving
- Coach: Craig Berube
- Captain: Auston Matthews
- Alternate captains: Mitch Marner; Morgan Rielly; John Tavares
- Arena: Scotiabank Arena
- Average attendance: 18,829
- Minor league affiliates: Toronto Marlies (AHL); Cincinnati Cyclones (ECHL)

Team leaders
- Goals: William Nylander (45)
- Assists: Mitch Marner (75)
- Points: Mitch Marner (102)
- Penalty minutes: Max Domi (76)
- Plus/minus: Christopher Tanev (+31)
- Wins: Joseph Woll (27)
- Goals against average: Anthony Stolarz (2.14)

The 2024–25 Toronto Maple Leafs season was the franchise's 108th season (107th season of play) in the National Hockey League (NHL).

Craig Berube was hired as head coach of the Toronto Maple Leafs on May 17, 2024, replacing Sheldon Keefe after their first-round exit in the 2024 Stanley Cup playoffs.

On April 2, the ECHL announced that they had terminated the membership of Toronto's affiliate, the Newfoundland Growlers. The Growlers were experiencing financial difficulties and failure to fulfill financial obligations under ECHL rules. The Maple Leafs announced on July 3, that the Cincinnati Cyclones would be their new ECHL affiliate.

On August 14, Auston Matthews was named the 26th captain in Maple Leafs history replacing John Tavares who held the position since the 2019–20 season.

On April 2, 2025, the Maple Leafs clinched a playoff berth for the ninth consecutive season, after a win over the Florida Panthers. They held the longest active playoff appearance streak at the time, making the playoffs every year since 2017 after the Boston Bruins (previously tied with them for the streak) failed to qualify for the 2025 playoffs. Later, on April 15, the Maple Leafs clinched the Atlantic Division championship with a 4–0 win over the Buffalo Sabres. This marked the first time that the team won the Atlantic Division since the league realigned prior to the 2013–14 season, their first division championship since winning the temporary North Division during the COVID-19 pandemic shortened 2020–21 season, and their first standard 82-game regular season division championship since the 1999–2000 season. This season also saw the Leafs record only four overtime losses, which is the fewest total since 2003–04 and the lowest in the salary cap era.

In the first round of the playoffs, the Maple Leafs played the Ottawa Senators for the first time since the 2004 playoffs, reviving the fierce Battle of Ontario rivalry fought over four series in the early 2000s. Toronto won all four series; however, Ottawa won all three of its games and swept the season series against Toronto this regular season. The Maple Leafs defeated the Senators in six games, advancing to the second round where they lost to the eventual Stanley Cup champion Florida Panthers in seven games, marking the seventh consecutive game seven loss for the Maple Leafs. This extended the team's record-breaking Stanley Cup drought to 57 seasons (58 years).

In the process, the Maple Leafs lost a playoff series to an eventual Stanley Cup champion for the first time since 2000 when they lost to the New Jersey Devils. Their streak of 23 seasons (not counting the 2004–05 lockout) without losing to an eventual champion was the longest in NHL history.

== Standings ==
=== Divisional standings ===
Atlantic Division
Pos	Team	GP	W	L	OTL	RW	GF	GA	GD	Pts
1	y – Toronto Maple Leafs	82	52	26	4	41	268	231	+37	108
2	x – Tampa Bay Lightning	82	47	27	8	41	294	219	+75	102
3	x – Florida Panthers	82	47	31	4	37	252	223	+29	98
4	x – Ottawa Senators	82	45	30	7	35	243	234	+9	97
5	x – Montreal Canadiens	82	40	31	11	30	245	265	−20	91
6	Detroit Red Wings	82	39	35	8	30	238	259	−21	86
7	Buffalo Sabres	82	36	39	7	29	269	289	−20	79
8	Boston Bruins	82	33	39	10	26	222	272	−50	76

Source: National Hockey League
Rules for classification: 1) Fewer number of games played (GP, only during regular season); 2) Greater number of regulation wins (RW); 3) Greater number of wins in regulation and overtime, excluding shootout wins (ROW); 4) Greater number of total wins, including shootouts (W); 5) Greater number of points earned in head-to-head play; if teams played an uneven number of head-to-head games, the result of the first game on the home ice of the team with the extra home game is discarded; 6) Greater goal differential (GD); 7) Greater number of goals scored (GF)
x – Clinched playoff spot; y – Clinched division

=== Conference standings ===
Eastern Conference Wild Card
Pos	Div	Team	GP	W	L	OTL	RW	GF	GA	GD	Pts
1	AT	x – Ottawa Senators	82	45	30	7	35	243	234	+9	97
2	AT	x – Montreal Canadiens	82	40	31	11	30	245	265	−20	91
3	ME	Columbus Blue Jackets	82	40	33	9	30	273	268	+5	89
4	AT	Detroit Red Wings	82	39	35	8	30	238	259	−21	86
5	ME	New York Rangers	82	39	36	7	35	256	255	+1	85
6	ME	New York Islanders	82	35	35	12	28	224	260	−36	82
7	ME	Pittsburgh Penguins	82	34	36	12	24	243	293	−50	80
8	AT	Buffalo Sabres	82	36	39	7	29	269	289	−20	79
9	AT	Boston Bruins	82	33	39	10	26	222	272	−50	76
10	ME	Philadelphia Flyers	82	33	39	10	21	238	286	−48	76

Source: National Hockey League
Rules for classification: 1) Fewer number of games played (GP, only during regular season); 2) Greater number of regulation wins (RW); 3) Greater number of wins in regulation and overtime, excluding shootout wins (ROW); 4) Greater number of total wins, including shootouts (W); 5) Greater number of points earned in head-to-head play; if teams played an uneven number of head-to-head games, the result of the first game on the home ice of the team with the extra home game is discarded; 6) Greater goal differential (GD); 7) Greater number of goals scored (GF)
x – Clinched playoff spot

== Schedule and results ==
=== Preseason ===
2024 preseason game log: 4–1–1 (Home: 2–0–1; Road: 2–1–0)
#	Date	Visitor	Score	Home	OT	Decision	Location	Attendance	Record	Recap
1	September 22	Ottawa	6–5	Toronto	OT	Murray (0–0–1)	Scotiabank Arena	14,531	0–0–1
2	September 24	Toronto	1–2	Ottawa		Hildeby (0–1–0)	Canadian Tire Centre	14,408	0–1–1
3	September 26	Montreal	1–2	Toronto		Stolarz (1–0–0)	Scotiabank Arena	18,107	1–1–1
4	September 28	Toronto	2–1	Montreal		Hildeby (1–1–0)	Bell Centre	21,105	2–1–1
5	October 3	Toronto	2–0	Detroit		Stolarz (2–0–0)	Little Caesars Arena	11,349	3–1–1
6	October 5	Detroit	2–3	Toronto		Woll (1–0–0)	Scotiabank Arena	18,524	4–1–1

=== Regular season ===
2024–25 Game Log: 52–26–4, 108 points (home: 27–13–1; road: 25–13–3)

October: 6–4–1, 13 points (Home: 4–2–0; Road: 2–2–1)
#	Date	Visitor	Score	Home	OT	Decision	Attendance	Record	Pts	Recap
1	October 9	Toronto	0–1	Montreal		Stolarz (0–1–0)	21,105	0–1–0	0
2	October 10	Toronto	4–2	New Jersey		Hildeby (1–0–0)	16,764	1–1–0	2
3	October 12	Pittsburgh	2–4	Toronto		Stolarz (1–1–0)	18,934	2–1–0	4
4	October 16	Los Angeles	2–6	Toronto		Stolarz (2–1–0)	18,852	3–1–0	6
5	October 19	NY Rangers	4–1	Toronto		Stolarz (2–2–0)	18,988	3–2–0	6
6	October 21	Tampa Bay	2–5	Toronto		Stolarz (3–2–0)	18,356	4–2–0	8
7	October 22	Toronto	2–6	Columbus		Hildeby (1–1–0)	14,852	4–3–0	8
8	October 24	St. Louis	5–1	Toronto		Woll (0–1–0)	18,414	4–4–0	8
9	October 26	Toronto	3–4	Boston	OT	Stolarz (3–2–1)	17,850	4–4–1	9
10	October 28	Toronto	6–4	Winnipeg		Stolarz (4–2–1)	15,325	5–4–1	11
11	October 31	Seattle	1–4	Toronto		Woll (1–1–0)	18,181	6–4–1	13

November: 8–3–1, 17 points (Home: 6–1–0; Road: 2–2–1)
#	Date	Visitor	Score	Home	OT	Decision	Attendance	Record	Pts	Recap
12	November 2	Toronto	2–4	St. Louis		Woll (1–2–0)	18,096	6–5–1	13
13	November 3	Toronto	1–2	Minnesota	OT	Stolarz (4–2–2)	18,096	6–5–2	14
14	November 5	Boston	0–4	Toronto		Stolarz (5–2–2)	18,730	7–5–2	16
15	November 8	Detroit	1–3	Toronto		Stolarz (6–2–2)	19,152	8–5–2	18
16	November 9	Montreal	1–4	Toronto		Woll (2–2–0)	19,277	9–5–2	20
17	November 12	Ottawa	3–0	Toronto		Stolarz (6–3–2)	18,648	9–6–2	20
18	November 13	Toronto	4–3	Washington	OT	Woll (3–2–0)	18,573	10–6–2	22
19	November 16	Edmonton	3–4	Toronto	OT	Stolarz (7–3–2)	19,301	11–6–2	24
20	November 20	Vegas	0–3	Toronto		Woll (4–2–0)	18,853	12–6–2	26
21	November 24	Utah	2–3	Toronto		Woll (5–2–0)	18,641	13–6–2	28
22	November 27	Toronto	1–5	Florida		Stolarz (7–4–2)	18,563	13–7–2	28
23	November 30	Toronto	5–3	Tampa Bay		Woll (6–2–0)	19,092	14–7–2	30

December: 9–6–0, 18 points (Home: 5–4–0; Road: 4–2–0)
#	Date	Visitor	Score	Home	OT	Decision	Attendance	Record	Pts	Recap
24	December 2	Chicago	1–4	Toronto		Stolarz (8–4–2)	18,557	15–7–2	32
25	December 4	Nashville	2–3	Toronto		Woll (7–2–0)	18,611	16–7–2	34
26	December 6	Washington	3–1	Toronto		Stolarz (8–5–2)	18,723	16–8–2	34
27	December 7	Toronto	2–5	Pittsburgh		Woll (7–3–0)	17,290	16–9–2	34
28	December 10	Toronto	2–1	New Jersey	OT	Stolarz (9–5–2)	16,091	17–9–2	36
29	December 12	Anaheim	2–3	Toronto		Woll (8–3–0)	18,688	18–9–2	38
30	December 14	Toronto	2–4	Detroit		Woll (8–4–0)	19,515	18–10–2	38
31	December 15	Buffalo	3–5	Toronto		Hildeby (2–1–0)	18,588	19–10–2	40
32	December 18	Toronto	5–3	Dallas		Woll (9–4–0)	18,532	20–10–2	42
33	December 20	Toronto	6–3	Buffalo		Murray (1–0–0)	18,267	21–10–2	44
34	December 21	NY Islanders	6–3	Toronto		Woll (9–5–0)	18,912	21–11–2	44
35	December 23	Winnipeg	5–2	Toronto		Woll (9–6–0)	18,923	21–12–2	44
36	December 27	Toronto	5–2	Detroit		Woll (10–6–0)	19,515	22–12–2	46
37	December 28	Washington	5–2	Toronto		Murray (1–1–0)	19,125	22–13–2	46
38	December 31	NY Islanders	1–3	Toronto		Woll (11–6–0)	18,933	23–13–2	48

January: 7–6–0, 14 points (Home: 4–4–0; Road: 3–2–0)
#	Date	Visitor	Score	Home	OT	Decision	Attendance	Record	Pts	Recap
39	January 2	Toronto	2–1	NY Islanders		Woll (12–6–0)	17,255	24–13–2	50
40	January 4	Boston	4–6	Toronto		Woll (13–6–0)	18,996	25–13–2	52
41	January 5	Philadelphia	2–3	Toronto	OT	Hildeby (3–1–0)	18,554	26–13–2	54
42	January 7	Toronto	3–2	Philadelphia		Woll (14–6–0)	18,058	27–13–2	56
43	January 9	Toronto	3–6	Carolina		Woll (14–7–0)	18,750	27–14–2	56
44	January 11	Vancouver	3–0	Toronto		Hildeby (3–2–0)	19,104	27–15–2	56
45	January 14	Dallas	4–1	Toronto		Woll (14–8–0)	18,535	27–16–2	56
46	January 16	New Jersey	3–4	Toronto	OT	Woll (15–8–0)	18,577	28–16–2	58
47	January 18	Toronto	7–3	Montreal		Woll (16–8–0)	21,105	29–16–2	60
48	January 20	Tampa Bay	3–5	Toronto		Woll (17–8–0)	19,123	30–16–2	62
49	January 22	Columbus	5–1	Toronto		Hildeby (3–3–0)	18,459	30–17–2	62
50	January 25	Toronto	1–2	Ottawa		Woll (17–9–0)	18,818	30–18–2	62
51	January 29	Minnesota	3–1	Toronto		Woll (17–10–0)	18,544	30–19–2	62

February: 7–1–0, 14 points (Home: 1–0–0; Road: 6–1–0)
#	Date	Visitor	Score	Home	OT	Decision	Attendance	Record	Pts	Recap
52	February 1	Toronto	4–3	Edmonton		Woll (18–10–0)	18,347	31–19–2	64
53	February 4	Toronto	6–3	Calgary		Woll (19–10–0)	18,769	32–19–2	66
54	February 6	Toronto	3–1	Seattle		Stolarz (10–5–2)	17,151	33–19–2	68
55	February 8	Toronto	1–2	Vancouver		Woll (19–11–0)	19,022	33–20–2	68
56	February 22	Carolina	3–6	Toronto		Stolarz (11–5–2)	18,914	34–20–2	70
57	February 23	Toronto	5–2	Chicago		Woll (20–11–0)	19,199	35–20–2	72
58	February 25	Toronto	5–4	Boston	OT	Stolarz (12–5–2)	17,850	36–20–2	74
59	February 28	Toronto	3–2	NY Rangers		Stolarz (13–5–2)	18,006	37–20–2	76

March: 8–5–2, 18 points (Home: 3–2–1; Road: 5–3–1)
#	Date	Visitor	Score	Home	OT	Decision	Attendance	Record	Pts	Recap
60	March 2	Toronto	6–5	Pittsburgh	OT	Woll (21–11–0)	16,284	38–20–2	78
61	March 3	San Jose	3–2	Toronto	SO	Stolarz (13–5–3)	18,884	38–20–3	79
62	March 5	Toronto	2–5	Vegas		Woll (21–12–0)	17,769	38–21–3	79
63	March 8	Toronto	4–7	Colorado		Stolarz (13–6–3)	18,094	38–22–3	79
64	March 10	Toronto	4–3	Utah	SO	Woll (22–12–0)	11,131	39–22–3	81
65	March 13	Florida	3–2	Toronto		Stolarz (13–7–3)	19,201	39–23–3	81
66	March 15	Ottawa	4–2	Toronto		Stolarz (13–8–3)	19,170	39–24–3	81
67	March 17	Calgary	2–6	Toronto		Woll (23–12–0)	19,033	40–24–3	83
68	March 19	Colorado	1–2	Toronto		Woll (24–12–0)	18,731	41–24–3	85
69	March 20	Toronto	4–3	NY Rangers		Stolarz (14–8–3)	17,235	42–24–3	87
70	March 22	Toronto	2–5	Nashville		Woll (24–13–0)	17,159	42–25–3	87
71	March 25	Philadelphia	2–7	Toronto		Stolarz (15–8–3)	18,691	43–25–3	89
72	March 27	Toronto	5–6	San Jose	SO	Woll (24–13–1)	15,514	43–25–4	90
73	March 29	Toronto	3–1	Los Angeles		Stolarz (16–8–3)	18,145	44–25–4	92
74	March 30	Toronto	3–2	Anaheim		Woll (25–13–1)	17,174	45–25–4	94

April: 7–1–0, 14 points (Home: 4–0–0; Road: 3–1–0)
#	Date	Visitor	Score	Home	OT	Decision	Attendance	Record	Pts	Recap
75	April 2	Florida	2–3	Toronto		Stolarz (17–8–3)	19,066	46–25–4	96
76	April 5	Columbus	0–5	Toronto		Stolarz (18–8–3)	19,179	47–25–4	98
77	April 8	Toronto	1–3	Florida		Woll (25–14–1)	19,261	47–26–4	98
78	April 9	Toronto	4–3	Tampa Bay	OT	Stolarz (19–8–3)	19,092	48–26–4	100
79	April 12	Montreal	0–1	Toronto	OT	Stolarz (20–8–3)	19,252	49–26–4	102
80	April 13	Toronto	4–1	Carolina		Woll (26–14–1)	18,905	50–26–4	104
81	April 15	Toronto	4–0	Buffalo		Stolarz (21–8–3)	17,160	51–26–4	106
82	April 17	Detroit	3–4	Toronto	OT	Woll (27–14–1)	18,605	52–26–4	108

Legend: Win (2 points) Loss (0 points) Overtime/shootout loss (1 point)

=== Playoffs ===
2025 Stanley Cup Playoffs

Eastern Conference First Round vs (WC1) Ottawa Senators: Toronto won 4–2
#	Date	Visitor	Score	Home	OT	Decision	Attendance	Series	Recap
1	April 20	Ottawa	2–6	Toronto		Stolarz (1–0)	19,072	1–0
2	April 22	Ottawa	2–3	Toronto	OT	Stolarz (2–0)	19,333	2–0
3	April 24	Toronto	3–2	Ottawa	OT	Stolarz (3–0)	19,073	3–0
4	April 26	Toronto	3–4	Ottawa	OT	Stolarz (3–1)	19,094	3–1
5	April 29	Ottawa	4–0	Toronto		Stolarz (3–2)	19,438	3–2
6	May 1	Toronto	4–2	Ottawa		Stolarz (4–2)	19,007	4–2

Eastern Conference Second Round vs (A3) Florida Panthers: Florida won 4–3
#	Date	Visitor	Score	Home	OT	Decision	Attendance	Series	Recap
1	May 5	Florida	4–5	Toronto		Woll (1–0)	19,031	1–0
2	May 7	Florida	3–4	Toronto		Woll (2–0)	19,261	2–0
3	May 9	Toronto	4–5	Florida	OT	Woll (2–1)	19,842	2–1
4	May 11	Toronto	0–2	Florida		Woll (2–2)	19,894	2–2
5	May 14	Florida	6–1	Toronto		Woll (2–3)	19,319	2–3
6	May 16	Toronto	2–0	Florida		Woll (3–3)	19,797	3–3
7	May 18	Florida	6–1	Toronto		Woll (3–4)	19,426	3–4

Legend: Win Loss

== Player statistics ==
=== Skaters ===
Regular season
Player	GP	G	A	Pts	+/−	PIM
Mitch Marner	81	27	75	102	+18	14
William Nylander	82	45	39	84	+10	26
Auston Matthews	67	33	45	78	+11	20
John Tavares	75	38	36	74	+10	46
Matthew Knies	78	29	29	58	+7	43
Morgan Rielly	82	7	34	41	−8	21
Bobby McMann	74	20	14	34	+12	27
Max Domi	74	8	25	33	+5	76
Oliver Ekman-Larsson	77	4	25	29	+14	52
Jake McCabe	66	2	21	23	+23	40
Nicholas Robertson	69	15	7	22	-1	16
Steven Lorentz	80	8	11	19	+6	9
Pontus Holmberg	68	7	12	19	+4	27
Christopher Tanev	75	3	15	18	+31	24
Max Pacioretty	37	5	8	13	−2	16
David Kampf	59	5	8	13	−1	14
Simon Benoit	78	1	9	10	+12	59
Conor Timmins ^{(X)}	51	2	6	8	+2	24
Calle Jarnkrok	19	1	6	7	+1	4
Philippe Myers	36	2	3	5	0	15
Scott Laughton	20	2	2	4	−1	11
Fraser Minten ^{(X)}	15	2	2	4	−4	0
Brandon Carlo	20	0	3	3	+4	13
Connor Dewar ^{(X)}	31	0	3	3	−3	5
Alex Steeves ^{(M)}	7	1	1	2	+3	0
Ryan Reaves ^{(M)}	35	0	2	2	−2	28
Dakota Mermis	3	0	1	1	0	0
Jani Hakanpaa	2	0	0	0	−1	0
Alexander Nylander ^{(M)}	5	0	0	0	−1	4
Timothy Liljegren ^{(X)}	1	0	0	0	0	2
Nikita Grebenkin ^{(X)}	7	0	0	0	−3	2
Jacob Quillan ^{(M)}	1	0	0	0	0	0

Playoffs
Player	GP	G	A	Pts	+/−	PIM
William Nylander	13	6	9	15	−3	4
Mitch Marner	13	2	11	13	−1	2
Auston Matthews	13	3	8	11	0	2
Max Pacioretty	11	3	5	8	+1	4
John Tavares	13	5	2	7	−6	10
Matthew Knies	13	5	2	7	−4	6
Morgan Rielly	13	4	3	7	−2	4
Max Domi	13	3	4	7	+2	33
Oliver Ekman-Larsson	13	2	2	4	−1	8
Jake McCabe	13	0	4	4	−1	2
Christopher Tanev	13	1	2	3	+2	2
Bobby McMann	13	0	3	3	−2	16
Simon Benoit	13	1	1	2	−3	10
Nicholas Robertson	3	1	1	2	+1	6
Scott Laughton	13	0	2	2	−3	8
Steven Lorentz	13	0	2	2	−4	4
Calle Jarnkrok	12	0	1	1	−4	2
Pontus Holmberg	12	0	1	1	−4	4
Brandon Carlo	13	0	0	0	−4	8
David Kampf	1	0	0	0	−2	0

=== Goaltenders ===
Regular season
Player	GP	GS	TOI	W	L	OT	GA	GAA	SA	SV%	SO	G	A	PIM
Joseph Woll	42	41	2,442:20	27	14	1	111	2.73	1,216	.909	1	0	0	0
Anthony Stolarz	34	33	1,986:54	21	8	3	71	2.14	955	.926	4	0	1	0
Dennis Hildeby ^{(M)}	6	6	360:49	3	3	0	20	3.33	156	.878	0	0	0	0
Matt Murray ^{(M)}	2	2	118:39	1	1	0	7	3.54	58	.879	0	0	0	0

Playoffs
Player	GP	GS	TOI	W	L	GA	GAA	SA	SV%	SO	G	A	PIM
Anthony Stolarz	7	7	410:18	4	2	15	2.19	151	.901	0	0	0	2
Joseph Woll	7	6	387:26	3	4	23	3.56	201	.886	1	0	0	0
Matt Murray	1	0	13:37	0	0	1	4.41	7	.857	0	0	0	0

^{(M)} Player was playing for the minor league affiliate Toronto Marlies of the AHL at the end of the regular season
^{(J)} Player assigned to junior club during the regular season
^{(X)} Player is no longer with the Maple Leafs organization by the end of the regular season

Bold/italics denotes franchise record.

== Transactions ==
The Maple Leafs have been involved in the following transactions during the 2024–25 season.

=== Key ===
† Contract is entry-level.
‡ Contract initially takes effect in the 2025–26 season.

=== Trades ===
Date	Details		Ref
June 29, 2024	To Dallas Stars Max Ellis; 7th-round pick in 2026	To Toronto Maple Leafs Christopher Tanev	
October 30, 2024	To San Jose Sharks Timothy Liljegren	To Toronto Maple Leafs Matt Benning conditional 3rd-round pick in 2025^{1} 6th-round pick in 2026	
March 7, 2025	To Philadelphia Flyers Nikita Grebenkin conditional 1st-round pick in 2027^{2}	To Toronto Maple Leafs Scott Laughton; 4th-round pick in 2025; 6th-round pick in 2027	
March 7, 2025	To Pittsburgh Penguins Connor Dewar; Conor Timmins	To Toronto Maple Leafs 5th-round pick in 2025	
March 7, 2025	To Boston Bruins Fraser Minten; PHI 4th-round pick in 2025 conditional 1st-round pick in 2026^{3}	To Toronto Maple Leafs Brandon Carlo	
March 7, 2025	To Minnesota Wild Future considerations	To Toronto Maple Leafs Reese Johnson	

==== Notes ====
- Toronto will receive the earliest of two picks that San Jose owns.
- Philadelphia will a receive a first-round pick in 2027 if Toronto's first is outside of the top ten selections.
- Boston will receive a first-round pick in 2026 if Toronto's first is outside of the top five selections and is not conveyed to Chicago.

=== Players acquired ===
Date	Player	Former team	Term	Via	Ref
July 1, 2024	Oliver Ekman-Larsson	Florida Panthers	4-year	Free agency	
July 2, 2024	Dakota Mermis	Minnesota Wild	1-year	Free agency	
July 2, 2024	Philippe Myers	Tampa Bay Lightning	1-year	Free agency	
July 2, 2024	Cedric Pare	Colorado Eagles (AHL)	1-year	Free agency	
July 2, 2024	Anthony Stolarz	Florida Panthers	2-year	Free agency	
September 11, 2024	Jani Hakanpaa	Dallas Stars	1-year	Free agency	
October 7, 2024	Steven Lorentz	Florida Panthers	1-year	Free agency	
October 7, 2024	Max Pacioretty	Washington Capitals	1-year	Free agency	
March 1, 2025	Borya Valis	Prince George Cougars (WHL)	3-year†	Free agency	
March 20, 2025	John Prokop	Union College (ECAC)	1-year†‡	Free agency	
March 24, 2025	Luke Haymes	Dartmouth (ECAC)	2-year†‡	Free agency	
April 10, 2025	Blake Smith	Flint Firebirds (OHL)	3-year†‡	Free agency	

=== Players lost ===
Date	Player	New team	Term	Via	Ref
July 1, 2024	Tyler Bertuzzi	Chicago Blackhawks	4-year	Free agency	
July 1, 2024	T. J. Brodie	Chicago Blackhawks	2-year	Free agency	
July 1, 2024	Joel Edmundson	Los Angeles Kings	4-year	Free agency	
July 1, 2024	Noah Gregor	Ottawa Senators	1-year	Free agency	
July 1, 2024	Maxime Lajoie	Seattle Kraken	1-year	Free agency	
July 1, 2024	Ilya Lyubushkin	Dallas Stars	3-year	Free agency	
July 1, 2024	Ilya Samsonov	Vegas Golden Knights	1-year	Free agency	
July 2, 2024	Dylan Gambrell	Columbus Blue Jackets	1-year	Free agency	

=== Signings ===
Date	Player	Term	Ref
June 30, 2024	Max Domi	4-year	
June 30, 2024	Timothy Liljegren	2-year	
July 1, 2024	Joseph Woll	3-year‡	
July 2, 2024	Matt Murray	1-year	
July 23, 2024	Connor Dewar	1-year	
August 2, 2024	Ben Danford	3-year†	
August 21, 2024	Alex Steeves	1-year	
September 5, 2024	Marshall Rifai	2-year‡	
October 7, 2024	Cade Webber	2-year‡	
January 3, 2025	Philippe Myers	2-year	

== Draft picks ==
Below are the Toronto Maple Leafs' selections at the 2024 NHL entry draft, which was held on June 28 to 29, 2024, at Sphere in Paradise, Nevada.

Round	#	Player	Pos.	Nationality	Team (League)
1	31	Ben Danford	D	Canada	Oshawa Generals (OHL)
4	120	Victor Johansson	D	Sweden	Leksands IF (SHL)
5	151	Miroslav Holinka	C	Czech Republic	HC Oceláři Třinec (Czech Extraliga)
5	152	Alexander Plesoviskikh	LW	Russia	Mamonty Yugry (MHL)
5	157	Timofei Obvintsev	G	Russia	Krasnaya Armiya (MHL)
7	200	Matt Lahey	D	Canada	Nanaimo Clippers (BCHL)
7	216	Sam McCue	LW	Canada	Owen Sound Attack (OHL)
7	225	Nathan Mayes	D	Canada	Spokane Chiefs (WHL)
