= 2024–25 Montreal Canadiens season =

Season of play of professional ice hockey team

2024–25 Montreal Canadiens
- Division: 5th Atlantic
- Conference: 8th Eastern
- 2024–25 record: 40–31–11
- Home record: 23–12–6
- Road record: 17–19–5
- Goals for: 245
- Goals against: 265

Team information
- General manager: Kent Hughes
- Coach: Martin St. Louis
- Captain: Nick Suzuki
- Alternate captains: Brendan Gallagher; Mike Matheson
- Arena: Bell Centre
- Average attendance: 21,105
- Minor league affiliates: Laval Rocket (AHL); Trois-Rivières Lions (ECHL)

Team leaders
- Goals: Cole Caufield (37)
- Assists: Lane Hutson (60)
- Points: Nick Suzuki (89)
- Penalty minutes: Arber Xhekaj (118)
- Plus/minus: Nick Suzuki (+19)
- Wins: Sam Montembeault (31)
- Goals against average: Jakub Dobes (2.74)

The 2024–25 Montreal Canadiens season was the 116th for the club that was established on December 4, 1909, and their 108th season as a franchise in the National Hockey League (NHL).

After finishing as the worst team in the league during the 2021–22 season and fifth-last in both the 2022–23 and 2023–24 campaigns, the rebuilding Canadiens approached the season at hand with the goal of being "in the mix" for the Stanley Cup playoffs until late March or April. Because of this, general manager Kent Hughes opted not to deal pending unrestricted free agents at the annual trade deadline, having judged the team's performance a success to that point.

Following the NHL's midseason hiatus for the 4 Nations Face-Off tournament in February 2025, the Canadiens performed strongly, culminating in a six-game winning streak from March 30 to April 8 that saw the team reach the second wild card position in the Eastern Conference standings, with four games remaining in their schedule. With other teams gradually being eliminated from playoff contention, the contest for the final wild card spot came down to the Canadiens and the Columbus Blue Jackets. After losing once in regulation and twice in overtime, the Canadiens entered their final regular season game against the Carolina Hurricanes on April 16, needing a single point to qualify for the playoffs. The Canadiens ultimately defeated the Hurricanes 4–2, securing their first playoff berth since 2021, and became the last team to clinch for 2024–25.

With an average age of 25.95 years, the current iteration of the roster overtook the 2012–13 Toronto Maple Leafs as the youngest team in history to qualify for the NHL postseason. Facing off against the top-seeded Washington Capitals in the ensuing first round, Montreal was defeated in five games.

After setting a number of franchise and league records for a rookie defenceman, Lane Hutson received the Calder Memorial Trophy as the Professional Hockey Writers' Association's choice for the season's best first-year player. He was the first Canadiens player to earn the distinction since goaltender Ken Dryden in the 1971–72 season.

== Standings ==
=== Divisional standings ===
Atlantic Division
Pos	Team	GP	W	L	OTL	RW	GF	GA	GD	Pts
1	y – Toronto Maple Leafs	82	52	26	4	41	268	231	+37	108
2	x – Tampa Bay Lightning	82	47	27	8	41	294	219	+75	102
3	x – Florida Panthers	82	47	31	4	37	252	223	+29	98
4	x – Ottawa Senators	82	45	30	7	35	243	234	+9	97
5	x – Montreal Canadiens	82	40	31	11	30	245	265	−20	91
6	Detroit Red Wings	82	39	35	8	30	238	259	−21	86
7	Buffalo Sabres	82	36	39	7	29	269	289	−20	79
8	Boston Bruins	82	33	39	10	26	222	272	−50	76

Source: National Hockey League
Rules for classification: 1) Fewer number of games played (GP, only during regular season); 2) Greater number of regulation wins (RW); 3) Greater number of wins in regulation and overtime, excluding shootout wins (ROW); 4) Greater number of total wins, including shootouts (W); 5) Greater number of points earned in head-to-head play; if teams played an uneven number of head-to-head games, the result of the first game on the home ice of the team with the extra home game is discarded; 6) Greater goal differential (GD); 7) Greater number of goals scored (GF)
x – Clinched playoff spot; y – Clinched division

=== Conference standings ===
Eastern Conference Wild Card
Pos	Div	Team	GP	W	L	OTL	RW	GF	GA	GD	Pts
1	AT	x – Ottawa Senators	82	45	30	7	35	243	234	+9	97
2	AT	x – Montreal Canadiens	82	40	31	11	30	245	265	−20	91
3	ME	Columbus Blue Jackets	82	40	33	9	30	273	268	+5	89
4	AT	Detroit Red Wings	82	39	35	8	30	238	259	−21	86
5	ME	New York Rangers	82	39	36	7	35	256	255	+1	85
6	ME	New York Islanders	82	35	35	12	28	224	260	−36	82
7	ME	Pittsburgh Penguins	82	34	36	12	24	243	293	−50	80
8	AT	Buffalo Sabres	82	36	39	7	29	269	289	−20	79
9	AT	Boston Bruins	82	33	39	10	26	222	272	−50	76
10	ME	Philadelphia Flyers	82	33	39	10	21	238	286	−48	76

Source: National Hockey League
Rules for classification: 1) Fewer number of games played (GP, only during regular season); 2) Greater number of regulation wins (RW); 3) Greater number of wins in regulation and overtime, excluding shootout wins (ROW); 4) Greater number of total wins, including shootouts (W); 5) Greater number of points earned in head-to-head play; if teams played an uneven number of head-to-head games, the result of the first game on the home ice of the team with the extra home game is discarded; 6) Greater goal differential (GD); 7) Greater number of goals scored (GF)
x – Clinched playoff spot

== Schedule and results ==
=== Preseason ===
The preseason schedule was published on June 19, 2024.

2024 preseason game log: 2–4–0 (Home: 2–2–0; Road: 0–2–0)
#	Date	Visitor	Score	Home	OT	Decision	Attendance	Record	Recap
1	September 23	Philadelphia	0–5	Montreal		Primeau	20,690	1–0–0
2	September 24	New Jersey	0–3	Montreal		Montembeault	20,539	2–0–0
3	September 26	Montreal	1–2	Toronto		Dobes	18,107	2–1–0
4	September 28	Toronto	2–1	Montreal		Primeau	21,105	2–2–0
5	October 1	Ottawa	4–3	Montreal		Primeau	20,983	2–3–0
6	October 5	Montreal	2–4	Ottawa		Montembeault	16,266	2–4–0

=== Regular season ===
The regular season schedule was released on July 2, 2024.

2024–25 game log

October: 4–6–1 (home: 3–4–0; road: 1–2–1)
#	Date	Visitor	Score	Home	OT	Decision	Attendance	Record	Pts	Recap
1	October 9	Toronto	0–1	Montreal		Montembeault	21,105	1–0–0	2
2	October 10	Montreal	4–6	Boston		Primeau	17,850	1–1–0	2
3	October 12	Ottawa	1–4	Montreal		Montembeault	21,105	2–1–0	4
4	October 14	Pittsburgh	6–3	Montreal		Montembeault	21,105	2–2–0	4
5	October 17	Los Angeles	4–1	Montreal		Montembeault	21,105	2–3–0	4
6	October 19	Montreal	3–4	NY Islanders	SO	Primeau	15,411	2–3–1	5
7	October 22	NY Rangers	7–2	Montreal		Montembeault	21,105	2–4–1	5
8	October 26	St. Louis	2–5	Montreal		Montembeault	21,105	3–4–1	7
9	October 27	Montreal	4–3	Philadelphia		Primeau	17,440	4–4–1	9
10	October 29	Seattle	8–2	Montreal		Montembeault	21,105	4–5–1	9
11	October 31	Montreal	3–6	Washington		Primeau	15,789	4–6–1	9

November: 4–6–2 (home: 2–1–2; road: 2–5–0)
#	Date	Visitor	Score	Home	OT	Decision	Attendance	Record	Pts	Recap
12	November 2	Montreal	1–3	Pittsburgh		Montembeault	17,362	4–7–1	9
13	November 5	Calgary	3–2	Montreal	OT	Montembeault	21,105	4–7–2	10
14	November 7	Montreal	3–5	New Jersey		Montembeault	16,514	4–8–2	10
15	November 9	Montreal	1–4	Toronto		Montembeault	19,277	4–9–2	10
16	November 11	Montreal	7–5	Buffalo		Montembeault	15,687	5–9–2	12
17	November 14	Montreal	0–3	Minnesota		Montembeault	17,012	5–10–2	12
18	November 16	Columbus	1–5	Montreal		Montembeault	21,105	6–10–2	14
19	November 18	Edmonton	0–3	Montreal		Montembeault	21,105	7–10–2	16
20	November 23	Vegas	6–2	Montreal		Montembeault	21,105	7–11–2	16
21	November 26	Utah	3–2	Montreal	OT	Montembeault	21,105	7–11–3	17
22	November 27	Montreal	4–3	Columbus	OT	Primeau	15,485	8–11–3	19
23	November 30	Montreal	3–4	NY Rangers		Montembeault	18,006	8–12–3	19

December: 9–5–0 (home: 5–2–0; road: 4–3–0)
#	Date	Visitor	Score	Home	OT	Decision	Attendance	Record	Pts	Recap
24	December 1	Montreal	3–6	Boston		Primeau	17,850	8–13–3	19
25	December 3	NY Islanders	1–2	Montreal	OT	Montembeault	21,105	9–13–3	21
26	December 5	Nashville	0–3	Montreal		Montembeault	21,105	10–13–3	23
27	December 7	Washington	4–2	Montreal		Montembeault	21,105	10–14–3	23
28	December 9	Anaheim	2–3	Montreal	SO	Montembeault	21,105	11–14–3	25
29	December 12	Pittsburgh	9–2	Montreal		Montembeault	21,105	11–15–3	25
30	December 14	Montreal	2–4	Winnipeg		Montembeault	15,225	11–16–3	25
31	December 17	Buffalo	1–6	Montreal		Montembeault	21,105	12–16–3	27
32	December 20	Montreal	4–3	Detroit		Montembeault	19,515	13–16–3	29
33	December 21	Detroit	1–5	Montreal		Montembeault	21,105	14–16–3	31
34	December 23	Montreal	4–5	Columbus		Montembeault	17,875	14–17–3	31
35	December 28	Montreal	4–0	Florida		Dobes	19,483	15–17–3	33
36	December 29	Montreal	5–2	Tampa Bay		Montembeault	19,092	16–17–3	35
37	December 31	Montreal	3–2	Vegas		Montembeault	17,925	17–17–3	37

January: 7–5–2 (home: 3–3–2; road: 4–2–0)
#	Date	Visitor	Score	Home	OT	Decision	Attendance	Record	Pts	Recap
38	January 3	Montreal	2–4	Chicago		Montembeault	19,620	17–18–3	37
39	January 4	Montreal	2–1	Colorado	SO	Dobes	18,087	18–18–3	39
40	January 6	Vancouver	4–5	Montreal	OT	Montembeault	21,105	19–18–3	41
41	January 10	Montreal	3–2	Washington	OT	Dobes	18,573	20–18–3	43
42	January 11	Dallas	2–1	Montreal	SO	Montembeault	21,105	20–18–4	44
43	January 14	Montreal	5–3	Utah		Montembeault	11,131	21–18–4	46
44	January 16	Montreal	3–1	Dallas		Dobes	18,532	22–18–4	48
45	January 18	Toronto	7–3	Montreal		Montembeault	21,105	22–19–4	48
46	January 19	NY Rangers	4–5	Montreal	OT	Dobes	21,105	23–19–4	50
47	January 21	Tampa Bay	2–3	Montreal		Montembeault	21,105	24–19–4	52
48	January 23	Montreal	2–4	Detroit		Montembeault	18,825	24–20–4	52
49	January 25	New Jersey	4–3	Montreal	OT	Dobes	21,105	24–20–5	53
50	January 28	Winnipeg	4–1	Montreal		Montembeault	21,105	24–21–5	53
51	January 30	Minnesota	4–0	Montreal		Dobes	21,105	24–22–5	53

February: 4–4–0 (home: 2–2–0; road: 2–2–0)
#	Date	Visitor	Score	Home	OT	Decision	Attendance	Record	Pts	Recap
52	February 2	Montreal	2–3	Anaheim		Montembeault	17,174	24–23–5	53
53	February 4	Montreal	4–3	San Jose		Montembeault	11,215	25–23–5	55
54	February 5	Montreal	3–6	Los Angeles		Dobes	15,584	25–24–5	55
55	February 8	New Jersey	4–0	Montreal		Montembeault	21,105	25–25–5	55
56	February 9	Tampa Bay	5–3	Montreal		Montembeault	21,105	25–26–5	55
57	February 22	Montreal	5–2	Ottawa		Montembeault	18,840	26–26–5	57
58	February 25	Carolina	0–4	Montreal		Montembeault	21,105	27–26–5	59
59	February 27	San Jose	3–4	Montreal	OT	Montembeault	21,105	28–26–5	61

March: 6–4–4 (home: 3–0–1; road: 3–4–3)
#	Date	Visitor	Score	Home	OT	Decision	Attendance	Record	Pts	Recap
60	March 1	Montreal	4–2	Buffalo		Dobes	18,361	29–26–5	63
61	March 3	Buffalo	3–4	Montreal	OT	Montembeault	21,105	30–26–5	65
62	March 6	Montreal	2–3	Edmonton	OT	Montembeault	18,347	30–26–6	66
63	March 8	Montreal	0–1	Calgary		Dobes	19,243	30–27–6	66
64	March 11	Montreal	4–2	Vancouver		Montembeault	18,886	31–27–6	68
65	March 12	Montreal	4–5	Seattle	OT	Dobes	17,151	31–27–7	69
66	March 15	Florida	1–3	Montreal		Montembeault	21,105	32–27–7	71
67	March 18	Ottawa	3–6	Montreal		Montembeault	21,105	33–27–7	73
68	March 20	Montreal	3–4	NY Islanders	OT	Montembeault	15,218	33–27–8	74
69	March 22	Colorado	5–4	Montreal	SO	Montembeault	21,105	33–27–9	75
70	March 25	Montreal	1–6	St. Louis		Montembeault	18,096	33–28–9	75
71	March 27	Montreal	4–6	Philadelphia		Dobes	19,284	33–29–9	75
72	March 28	Montreal	1–4	Carolina		Montembeault	18,795	33–30–9	75
73	March 30	Montreal	4–2	Florida		Montembeault	19,432	34–30–9	77

April: 6–1–2 (home: 5–0–1; road: 1–1–1)
#	Date	Visitor	Score	Home	OT	Decision	Attendance	Record	Pts	Recap
74	April 1	Florida	2–3	Montreal	OT	Montembeault	21,105	35–30–9	79
75	April 3	Boston	1–4	Montreal		Montembeault	21,105	36–30–9	81
76	April 5	Philadelphia	2–3	Montreal		Montembeault	21,105	37–30–9	83
77	April 6	Montreal	2–1	Nashville		Dobes	17,183	38–30–9	85
78	April 8	Detroit	1–4	Montreal		Montembeault	21,105	39–30–9	87
79	April 11	Montreal	2–5	Ottawa		Montembeault	18,685	39–31–9	87
80	April 12	Montreal	0–1	Toronto	OT	Dobes	19,252	39–31–10	88
81	April 14	Chicago	4–3	Montreal	SO	Montembeault	21,105	39–31–11	89
82	April 16	Carolina	2–4	Montreal		Montembeault	21,105	40–31–11	91

Legend: Win (2 points) Loss (0 points) Overtime/shootout loss (1 point)

=== Playoffs ===
2025 Stanley Cup playoffs

Eastern Conference First Round vs. (M1) Washington Capitals: Washington won 4–1
#	Date	Visitor	Score	Home	OT	Decision	Attendance	Series	Recap
1	April 21	Montreal	2–3	Washington	OT	Montembeault	18,573	0–1
2	April 23	Montreal	1–3	Washington		Montembeault	18,573	0–2
3	April 25	Washington	3–6	Montreal		Dobes	21,105	1–2
4	April 27	Washington	5–2	Montreal		Dobes	21,105	1–3
5	April 30	Montreal	1–4	Washington		Dobes	18,573	1–4

Legend: Win Loss

== Player statistics ==
Final stats

=== Skaters ===
Regular season
Player	GP	G	A	Pts	+/−	PIM
Nick Suzuki	82	30	59	89	+19	8
Cole Caufield	82	37	33	70	+9	14
Lane Hutson	82	6	**60***	**66**	−2	34
Juraj Slafkovsky	79	18	33	51	+4	45
Brendan Gallagher	82	21	17	38	−6	39
Jake Evans	82	13	23	36	+1	10
Patrik Laine	52	20	13	33	−14	14
Christian Dvorak	82	12	21	33	−5	16
Mike Matheson	80	6	25	31	−6	51
Joel Armia	81	11	18	29	−2	16
Josh Anderson	81	15	12	27	−2	90
Alex Newhook	82	15	11	26	−21	24
Kirby Dach	57	10	12	22	−29	40
Emil Heineman	62	10	8	18	−6	20
Alexandre Carrier^{†}	51	2	16	18	+4	28
Kaiden Guhle	55	6	12	18	+6	47
David Savard	75	1	14	15	−8	36
Jayden Struble	56	2	11	13	+2	52
Arber Xhekaj	70	1	5	6	−13	118
Logan Mailloux	7	2	2	4	−5	6
Joshua Roy	12	2	0	2	−6	2
Ivan Demidov	2	1	1	2	+1	0
Oliver Kapanen	18	0	2	2	−5	2
Lucas Condotta	7	1	0	1	−2	0
Justin Barron^{‡}	17	1	0	1	−4	8
Owen Beck	12	0	1	1	−2	0
Rafael Harvey-Pinard	1	0	0	0	0	0
Alex Barre-Boulet	2	0	0	0	−2	2
Michael Pezzetta	25	0	0	0	−2	24

Playoffs
Player	GP	G	A	Pts	+/−	PIM
Lane Hutson	5	0	5	5	−5	0
Cole Caufield	5	3	1	4	−6	0
Christian Dvorak	5	2	0	2	−1	4
Juraj Slafkovsky	5	2	0	2	−4	4
Nick Suzuki	5	2	0	2	−5	2
Alexandre Carrier	5	1	1	2	0	0
Alex Newhook	5	1	1	2	−3	4
Joel Armia	5	0	2	2	+2	2
Ivan Demidov	5	0	2	2	−5	0
Brendan Gallagher	5	0	2	2	−7	0
Emil Heineman	5	1	0	1	+1	0
Oliver Kapanen	3	0	1	1	0	0
Jake Evans	5	0	1	1	0	2
Mike Matheson	5	0	1	1	−1	2
Patrik Laine	2	0	1	1	−2	2
David Savard	5	0	1	1	−2	0
Josh Anderson	5	0	1	1	−2	20
Arber Xhekaj	3	0	0	0	+1	4
Jayden Struble	2	0	0	0	−2	0
Kaiden Guhle	5	0	0	0	−3	4

=== Goaltenders ===
Regular season
Player	GP	GS	TOI	W	L	OT	GA	GAA	SA	SV%	SO	G	A	PIM
Sam Montembeault	62	60	3533:59	31	24	7	166	2.82	1678	.902	4	0	1	0
Jakub Dobes	16	15	874:47	7	4	3	40	2.74	440	.909	1	0	0	0
Cayden Primeau	11	7	523:42	2	3	1	41	4.70	250	.836	0	0	0	2

Playoffs
Player	GP	GS	TOI	W	L	GA	GAA	SA	SV%	SO	G	A	PIM
Jakub Dobes	3	2	144:07	1	2	7	2.91	59	.881	0	0	0	0
Sam Montembeault	3	3	152:07	0	2	7	2.76	76	.908	0	0	0	0

^{†}Denotes player spent time with another team before joining the Canadiens. Stats reflect time with the Canadiens only.
^{‡}Denotes player was traded mid-season. Stats reflect time with the Canadiens only.
Bold denotes franchise record.
^{*}Denotes league record.

== Suspensions/fines ==
Player	Explanation	Length	Salary	Date issued	Ref
Arber Xhekaj	Unsportsmanlike conduct against Leafs forward Cedric Pare	N/A	$3,385.42	September 29, 2024	
Josh Anderson	Unsportsmanlike conduct against Capitals forward Tom Wilson	N/A	$5,000.00	April 26, 2025	
Team	Unsportsmanlike conduct during warmups prior to a playoff game against the Washington Capitals	N/A	$25,000.00	April 28, 2025	
Arber Xhekaj	Unsportsmanlike conduct during warmups prior to a playoff game against the Washington Capitals	N/A	$3,385.42	April 28, 2025	

== Awards and honours ==
=== Awards ===
Regular season
Player	Award	Awarded	Ref
Patrik Laine	NHL Third Star of the Week	December 22, 2024	
Lane Hutson	NHL Rookie of the Month	December 31, 2024	
Nick Suzuki	NHL Third Star of the Week	March 3, 2025	
Lane Hutson	NHL Rookie of the Month	April 1, 2025	
Nick Suzuki	NHL Second Star of the Week	April 7, 2025	
Lane Hutson	Calder Memorial Trophy	June 10, 2025	
Lane Hutson	NHL All-Rookie Team	June 12, 2025	

=== Milestones ===
Regular season
Player	Milestone	Reached	Ref
Kirby Dach	100th career NHL point	October 9, 2024	
Oliver Kapanen	1st career NHL game 1st career NHL assist 1st career NHL point	October 10, 2024	
Emil Heineman	1st career NHL goal 1st career NHL point	October 12, 2024	
David Savard	800th career NHL game	October 17, 2024	
Arber Xhekaj	100th career NHL game	October 17, 2024	
Justin Barron	100th career NHL game	October 19, 2024	
Logan Mailloux	1st career NHL goal	October 19, 2024	
Emil Heineman	1st career NHL assist	November 2, 2024	
Nick Suzuki	300th career NHL point	November 11, 2024	
Jake Evans	100th career NHL point	November 16, 2024	
Nick Suzuki	400th career NHL game	December 7, 2024	
Lane Hutson	1st career NHL goal	December 14, 2024	
Jake Evans	300th career NHL game	December 20, 2024	
Nick Suzuki	200th career NHL assist	December 21, 2024	
Jakub Dobes	1st career NHL game 1st career NHL win 1st career NHL shutout	December 28, 2024	
Josh Anderson	100th career NHL assist	December 29, 2024	
Cole Caufield	100th career NHL goal	December 31, 2024	
Patrik Laine	400th career NHL point	January 14, 2025	
Joel Armia	100th career NHL goal	January 16, 2025	
Joel Armia	100th career NHL assist 200th career NHL point	January 21, 2025	
Christian Dvorak	500th career NHL game	January 23, 2025	
Brendan Gallagher	800th career NHL game	January 23, 2025	
Patrik Laine	500th career NHL game	January 23, 2025	
Martin St. Louis	100th career NHL coaching win	February 4, 2025	
Mike Matheson	600th career NHL game	February 8, 2025	
Cole Caufield	200th career NHL point	February 25, 2025	
Owen Beck	1st career NHL assist 1st career NHL point	February 27, 2025	
Josh Anderson	600th career NHL game	March 12, 2025	
Juraj Slafkovsky	100th career NHL point	March 12, 2025	
Christian Dvorak	100th career NHL goal	March 15, 2025	
Jayden Struble	100th career NHL game	March 25, 2025	
Sam Montembeault	200th career NHL game	April 1, 2025	
Michael Pezzetta	200th career NHL game	April 12, 2025	
Cole Caufield	100th career NHL assist	April 14, 2025	
Ivan Demidov	1st career NHL game 1st career NHL assist 1st career NHL point 1st career NHL goal	April 14, 2025	
Juraj Slafkovsky	200th career NHL game	April 16, 2025	

Playoffs
Player	Milestone	Reached
Ivan Demidov	1st career playoff game	April 21, 2025
Kaiden Guhle	1st career playoff game	April 21, 2025
Emil Heineman	1st career playoff game	April 21, 2025
Lane Hutson	1st career playoff game 1st career playoff assist 1st career playoff point	April 21, 2025
Sam Montembeault	1st career playoff game	April 21, 2025
Juraj Slafkovsky	1st career playoff game	April 21, 2025
Jayden Struble	1st career playoff game	April 21, 2025
Jakub Dobes	1st career playoff game 1st career playoff win	April 25, 2025
Oliver Kapanen	1st career playoff game	April 25, 2025
Juraj Slafkovsky	1st career playoff goal 1st career playoff point	April 25, 2025
Arber Xhekaj	1st career playoff game	April 25, 2025
Ivan Demidov	1st career playoff assist 1st career playoff point	April 27, 2025
Emil Heineman	1st career playoff goal 1st career playoff point	April 30, 2025
Oliver Kapanen	1st career playoff assist 1st career playoff point	April 30, 2025

== Transactions ==
The Canadiens have been involved in the following transactions during the 2024–25 season.

=== Key ===
† Contract is entry-level.
‡ Contract initially takes effect in the 2025–26 season.

=== Trades ===
Date	Details		Ref
June 28, 2024	To Los Angeles Kings WPG 1st-round pick in 2024 (26th overall); COL 2nd-round pick in 2024 (57th overall); 7th-round pick in 2024 (198th overall)	To Montreal Canadiens 1st-round pick in 2024 (21st overall)	
June 30, 2024	To New Jersey Devils Johnathan Kovacevic	To Montreal Canadiens 4th-round pick in 2026^{1}	
August 19, 2024	To Columbus Blue Jackets Jordan Harris	To Montreal Canadiens Patrik Laine; 2nd-round pick in 2026	
December 6, 2024	To Edmonton Oilers Jacob Perreault	To Montreal Canadiens Noel Hoefenmayer	
December 18, 2024	To Nashville Predators Justin Barron	To Montreal Canadiens Alexandre Carrier	

==== Notes ====
1. Montreal will receive the highest of the (3) fourth-round picks currently owned by New Jersey (Dallas’, Winnipeg’s or New Jersey’s own), once the final draft order has been established.

=== Players acquired ===
Date	Player	Former team (League)	Term	Via	Ref
July 1, 2024	Alex Barre-Boulet	Tampa Bay Lightning	1-year	Free agency	
October 9, 2024	Gustav Lindstrom	Anaheim Ducks	1-year	Free agency	

=== Players lost ===
Date	Player	New team (League)	Term	Via	Ref
July 1, 2024	Mitchell Stephens	Seattle Kraken	2-year	Free agency	
July 1, 2024	Jesse Ylonen	Tampa Bay Lightning	1-year	Free agency	
July 3, 2024	Arnaud Durandeau	Amur Khabarovsk (KHL)	1-year	Free agency	
July 28, 2024	Philippe Maillet	HC Ambrì-Piotta (NL)	1-year	Free agency	
August 2, 2024	Brady Keeper	HK Poprad (Tipos Extraliga)	1-year	Free agency	
August 13, 2024	Colin White	San Jose Barracuda (AHL)	1-year	Free agency	
September 4, 2024	Mattias Norlinder	Modo Hockey (SHL)	2-year	Free agency	
October 4, 2024	Tanner Pearson	Vegas Golden Knights	1-year	Free agency	
April 30, 2025	David Savard			Retirement	
May 6, 2025	Connor Hughes	Lausanne HC (NL)	5-year	Free agency	
June 5, 2025	Gustav Lindstrom	Djurgårdens IF (SHL)	5-year	Free agency	
June 14, 2025	Brandon Gignac	EHC Kloten (NL)	2-year	Free agency	

=== Signings ===
Date	Player	Term	Ref
July 1, 2024	Juraj Slafkovsky	8-year^{‡}	
July 30, 2024	Justin Barron	2-year	
July 30, 2024	Arber Xhekaj	2-year	
July 31, 2024	Kaiden Guhle	6-year^{‡}	
March 4, 2025	Jake Evans	4-year^{‡}	
March 19, 2025	Lucas Condotta	2-year^{‡}	
April 4, 2025	Jacob Fowler	3-year^{†‡}	
April 8, 2025	Ivan Demidov	3-year^{†}	
April 8, 2025	Tyler Thorpe	3-year^{†‡}	
June 14, 2025	Vinzenz Rohrer	3-year^{†‡}	

== Draft picks ==
Below are the Montreal Canadiens' selections at the 2024 NHL entry draft, which was held on June 28–29, 2024, at Sphere in Las Vegas, Nevada.

Round	#	Player	Pos.	Nationality	Team (League)
1	5	Ivan Demidov	RW	Russia	SKA-1946 (MHL)
1	21^{1}	Michael Hage	C	Canada	Chicago Steel (USHL)
3	70	Aatos Koivu	C	Finland	HC-TPS (U20 SM-sarja)
3	78^{2}	Logan Sawyer	LW	Canada	Brooks Bandits (AJHL)
4	102	Owen Protz	D	Canada	Brantford Bulldogs (OHL)
5	130^{3}	Tyler Thorpe	RW	Canada	Vancouver Giants (WHL)
5	134	Mikus Vecvanags	G	Latvia	HS Riga (OHL Latvia)
6	166	Ben Merrill	C	United States	Saint Sebastian's Arrows (USHS)
7	210^{4}	Makar Khanin	RW	Russia	HC Dinamo Saint Petersburg (MHL)
7	224^{5}	Rasmus Bergqvist	D	Sweden	Skellefteå AIK (J20 Nationell)

=== Notes ===
1. The Los Angeles Kings' first-round pick went to Montreal as the result of a trade on June 28, 2024, that sent Winnipeg's first-round pick, Colorado's second-round pick and a seventh-round pick all in 2024 (26th, 57th and 198th overall) to Los Angeles in exchange for this pick.
2. The Minnesota Wild's third-round pick went to Montreal as the result of a trade July 1, 2023, that sent Joel Edmundson to the Washington Capitals in exchange for a seventh-round pick in 2024 and this pick.
  Washington previously acquired this pick as the result of a trade on February 28, 2023, that sent Marcus Johansson to Minnesota in exchange for this pick.
3. The San Jose Sharks' fifth-round pick went to Montreal as the result of a trade on March 3, 2023, that sent Arvid Henrikson to San Jose in exchange for Nick Bonino and this pick.
4. The Washington Capitals' seventh-round pick went to Montreal as the result of a trade July 1, 2023, that sent Joel Edmundson to Washington in exchange for a third-round pick in 2024 and this pick.
5. The Edmonton Oilers' seventh-round pick went to Montreal as the result of a trade on March 21, 2022, that sent Brett Kulak to Edmonton in exchange for William Lagesson, a conditional second-round pick in 2022 and this pick.
