= 2024–25 San Jose Sharks season =

NHL team season

2024–25 San Jose Sharks
- Division: 8th Pacific
- Conference: 16th Western
- 2024–25 record: 20–50–12
- Home record: 12–27–2
- Road record: 8–23–10
- Goals for: 210
- Goals against: 315

Team information
- General manager: Mike Grier
- Coach: Ryan Warsofsky
- Captain: Logan Couture
- Alternate captains: Mario Ferraro; Barclay Goodrow; Mikael Granlund (Oct. 10 – Feb. 1); Luke Kunin (Oct. 10 – Mar. 7); Tyler Toffoli
- Arena: SAP Center
- Average attendance: 14,219
- Minor league affiliate: San Jose Barracuda (AHL)

Team leaders
- Goals: Tyler Toffoli (30)
- Assists: William Eklund (41)
- Points: Macklin Celebrini (63)
- Penalty minutes: Barclay Goodrow (75)
- Plus/minus: Fabian Zetterlund (+8)
- Wins: Alexandar Georgiev (7)
- Goals against average: Yaroslav Askarov (3.10)

The 2024–25 San Jose Sharks season was the 34th season for the National Hockey League (NHL) franchise that was established on May 9, 1990. Ryan Warsofsky is the new head coach, starting with this season.

On March 16, 2025, the Sharks were eliminated from playoff contention for the sixth consecutive season after the St. Louis Blues defeated the Anaheim Ducks.

== Standings ==
=== Divisional standings ===
Pacific Division
| Pos | Team | GP | W | L | OTL | RW | GF | GA | GD | Pts |
|---|---|---|---|---|---|---|---|---|---|---|
| 1 | y – Vegas Golden Knights | 82 | 50 | 22 | 10 | 46 | 275 | 219 | +56 | 110 |
| 2 | x – Los Angeles Kings | 82 | 48 | 25 | 9 | 43 | 250 | 206 | +44 | 105 |
| 3 | x – Edmonton Oilers | 82 | 48 | 29 | 5 | 36 | 259 | 236 | +23 | 101 |
| 4 | Calgary Flames | 82 | 41 | 27 | 14 | 31 | 225 | 238 | −13 | 96 |
| 5 | Vancouver Canucks | 82 | 38 | 30 | 14 | 28 | 236 | 253 | −17 | 90 |
| 6 | Anaheim Ducks | 82 | 35 | 37 | 10 | 24 | 221 | 263 | −42 | 80 |
| 7 | Seattle Kraken | 82 | 35 | 41 | 6 | 28 | 247 | 265 | −18 | 76 |
| 8 | San Jose Sharks | 82 | 20 | 50 | 12 | 14 | 210 | 315 | −105 | 52 |

Source: National Hockey League
Rules for classification: 1) Fewer number of games played (GP, only during regular season); 2) Greater number of regulation wins (RW); 3) Greater number of wins in regulation and overtime, excluding shootout wins (ROW); 4) Greater number of total wins, including shootouts (W); 5) Greater number of points earned in head-to-head play; if teams played an uneven number of head-to-head games, the result of the first game on the home ice of the team with the extra home game is discarded; 6) Greater goal differential (GD); 7) Greater number of goals scored (GF)
x – Clinched playoff spot; y – Clinched division

=== Conference standings ===
Western Conference Wild Card
| Pos | Div | Team | GP | W | L | OTL | RW | GF | GA | GD | Pts |
|---|---|---|---|---|---|---|---|---|---|---|---|
| 1 | CE | x – Minnesota Wild | 82 | 45 | 30 | 7 | 33 | 228 | 239 | −11 | 97 |
| 2 | CE | x – St. Louis Blues | 82 | 44 | 30 | 8 | 32 | 254 | 233 | +21 | 96 |
| 3 | PA | Calgary Flames | 82 | 41 | 27 | 14 | 31 | 225 | 238 | −13 | 96 |
| 4 | PA | Vancouver Canucks | 82 | 38 | 30 | 14 | 28 | 236 | 253 | −17 | 90 |
| 5 | CE | Utah Hockey Club | 82 | 38 | 31 | 13 | 30 | 241 | 251 | −10 | 89 |
| 6 | PA | Anaheim Ducks | 82 | 35 | 37 | 10 | 24 | 221 | 263 | −42 | 80 |
| 7 | PA | Seattle Kraken | 82 | 35 | 41 | 6 | 28 | 247 | 265 | −18 | 76 |
| 8 | CE | Nashville Predators | 82 | 30 | 44 | 8 | 24 | 214 | 274 | −60 | 68 |
| 9 | CE | Chicago Blackhawks | 82 | 25 | 46 | 11 | 20 | 226 | 296 | −70 | 61 |
| 10 | PA | San Jose Sharks | 82 | 20 | 50 | 12 | 14 | 210 | 315 | −105 | 52 |

Source: National Hockey League
Rules for classification: 1) Fewer number of games played (GP, only during regular season); 2) Greater number of regulation wins (RW); 3) Greater number of wins in regulation and overtime, excluding shootout wins (ROW); 4) Greater number of total wins, including shootouts (W); 5) Greater number of points earned in head-to-head play; if teams played an uneven number of head-to-head games, the result of the first game on the home ice of the team with the extra home game is discarded; 6) Greater goal differential (GD); 7) Greater number of goals scored (GF)
x – Clinched playoff spot

== Schedule ==
=== Preseason ===
The preseason schedule was announced on June 20, 2024.

Preseason game log

2024 preseason game log: 2–3–1 (home: 0–2–1; away: 2–1–0)
| # | Date | Visitor | Score | Home | OT | Decision | Attendance | Record | Recap |
|---|---|---|---|---|---|---|---|---|---|
| 1 | September 22 | Vegas | 4–2 | San Jose | | Romanov | 9,049 | 0–1–0 | Recap |
| 2 | September 24 | Anaheim | 4–3 | San Jose | | Carriere | 9,462 | 0–2–0 | Recap |
| 3 | September 26 | San Jose | 3–2 | Anaheim | OT | Romanov | 10,683 | 1–2–0 | Recap |
| 4 | October 1 | Utah | 3–1 | San Jose | | Blackwood | 8,562 | 1–3–0 | Recap |
| 5 | October 4 | Anaheim | 3–2 | San Jose | SO | Vanecek | 9,552 | 1–3–1 | Recap |
| 6 | October 5 | San Jose | 6–5 | Vegas | | Blackwood | 17,590 | 2–3–1 | Recap |

Legend: Win Loss Overtime/shootout loss

=== Regular season ===
The schedule was announced on July 2, 2024.

2024–25 game log: 20–50–12 (home: 12–27–2; away: 8–23–10)

October: 3–7–2 (home: 2–2–1; away: 1–5–1)
| # | Date | Visitor | Score | Home | OT | Decision | Attendance | Record | Pts | Recap |
|---|---|---|---|---|---|---|---|---|---|---|
| 1 | October 10 | St. Louis | 5–4 | San Jose | OT | Blackwood | 17,435 | 0–0–1 | 1 | Recap |
| 2 | October 12 | Anaheim | 2–0 | San Jose | | Vanecek | 17,016 | 0–1–1 | 1 | Recap |
| 3 | October 15 | San Jose | 2–3 | Dallas | SO | Blackwood | 18,532 | 0–1–2 | 2 | Recap |
| 4 | October 17 | San Jose | 2–4 | Chicago | | Vanecek | 19,056 | 0–2–2 | 2 | Recap |
| 5 | October 18 | San Jose | 3–8 | Winnipeg | | Blackwood | 13,422 | 0–3–2 | 2 | Recap |
| 6 | October 20 | Colorado | 4–1 | San Jose | | Vanecek | 14,125 | 0–4–2 | 2 | Recap |
| 7 | October 22 | San Jose | 1–3 | Anaheim | | Blackwood | 17,174 | 0–5–2 | 2 | Recap |
| 8 | October 24 | San Jose | 2–3 | Los Angeles | | Blackwood | 18,146 | 0–6–2 | 2 | Recap |
| 9 | October 26 | San Jose | 3–7 | Vegas | | Vanecek | 17,686 | 0–7–2 | 2 | Recap |
| 10 | October 28 | San Jose | 5–4 | Utah | OT | Blackwood | 11,131 | 1–7–2 | 4 | Recap |
| 11 | October 29 | Los Angeles | 2–4 | San Jose | | Vanecek | 10,818 | 2–7–2 | 6 | Recap |
| 12 | October 31 | Chicago | 2–3 | San Jose | | Blackwood | 10,315 | 3–7–2 | 8 | Recap |

November: 6–6–3 (home: 4–4–0; away: 2–2–3)
| # | Date | Visitor | Score | Home | OT | Decision | Attendance | Record | Pts | Recap |
|---|---|---|---|---|---|---|---|---|---|---|
| 13 | November 2 | Vancouver | 3–2 | San Jose | | Blackwood | 17,435 | 3–8–2 | 8 | Recap |
| 14 | November 5 | Columbus | 1–2 | San Jose | OT | Vanecek | 10,376 | 4–8–2 | 10 | Recap |
| 15 | November 7 | Minnesota | 5–2 | San Jose | | Vanecek | 10,526 | 4–9–2 | 10 | Recap |
| 16 | November 10 | San Jose | 1–0 | New Jersey | | Blackwood | 16,514 | 5–9–2 | 12 | Recap |
| 17 | November 11 | San Jose | 3–4 | Philadelphia | SO | Vanecek | 18,706 | 5–9–3 | 13 | Recap |
| 18 | November 14 | San Jose | 2–3 | NY Rangers | | Blackwood | 18,006 | 5–10–3 | 13 | Recap |
| 19 | November 16 | San Jose | 3–4 | Pittsburgh | SO | Blackwood | 18,194 | 5–10–4 | 14 | Recap |
| 20 | November 18 | Detroit | 4–5 | San Jose | OT | Blackwood | 11,180 | 6–10–4 | 16 | Recap |
| 21 | November 20 | San Jose | 2–5 | Dallas | | Blackwood | 18,532 | 6–11–4 | 16 | Recap |
| 22 | November 21 | San Jose | 2–3 | St. Louis | SO | Askarov | 17,273 | 6–11–5 | 17 | Recap |
| 23 | November 23 | Buffalo | 4–2 | San Jose | | Blackwood | 17,435 | 6–12–5 | 17 | Recap |
| 24 | November 25 | Los Angeles | 2–7 | San Jose | | Askarov | 10,713 | 7–12–5 | 19 | Recap |
| 25 | November 27 | Ottawa | 4–3 | San Jose | | Blackwood | 10,778 | 7–13–5 | 19 | Recap |
| 26 | November 29 | Seattle | 5–8 | San Jose | | Vanecek | 14,795 | 8–13–5 | 21 | Recap |
| 27 | November 30 | San Jose | 4–2 | Seattle | | Blackwood | 17,151 | 9–13–5 | 23 | Recap |

December : 2–10–1 (home: 0–6–0; away: 2–4–1)
| # | Date | Visitor | Score | Home | OT | Decision | Attendance | Record | Pts | Recap |
|---|---|---|---|---|---|---|---|---|---|---|
| 28 | December 3 | San Jose | 2–1 | Washington | OT | Blackwood | 17,859 | 10–13–5 | 25 | Recap |
| 29 | December 5 | San Jose | 1–8 | Tampa Bay | | Vanecek | 19,092 | 10–14–5 | 25 | Recap |
| 30 | December 7 | San Jose | 1–3 | Florida | | Blackwood | 18,646 | 10–15–5 | 25 | Recap |
| 31 | December 10 | San Jose | 2–3 | Carolina | | Vanecek | 18,700 | 10–16–5 | 25 | Recap |
| 32 | December 12 | San Jose | 4–3 | St. Louis | | Georgiev | 18,096 | 11–16–5 | 27 | Recap |
| 33 | December 14 | Utah | 4–3 | San Jose | | Vanecek | 17,213 | 11–17–5 | 27 | Recap |
| 34 | December 17 | Winnipeg | 4–3 | San Jose | | Georgiev | 10,958 | 11–18–5 | 27 | Recap |
| 35 | December 19 | Colorado | 4–2 | San Jose | | Georgiev | 12,517 | 11–19–5 | 27 | Recap |
| 36 | December 21 | San Jose | 2–3 | Edmonton | OT | Askarov | 18,347 | 11–19–6 | 28 | Recap |
| 37 | December 23 | San Jose | 3–4 | Vancouver | | Askarov | 18,791 | 11–20–6 | 28 | Recap |
| 38 | December 27 | Vegas | 6–3 | San Jose | | Georgiev | 17,435 | 11–21–6 | 28 | Recap |
| 39 | December 28 | Calgary | 3–1 | San Jose | | Askarov | 17,435 | 11–22–6 | 28 | Recap |
| 40 | December 31 | Philadelphia | 4–0 | San Jose | | Georgiev | 14,816 | 11–23–6 | 28 | Recap |

January: 4–9–0 (home: 3–4–0; away: 1–5–0)
| # | Date | Visitor | Score | Home | OT | Decision | Attendance | Record | Pts | Recap |
|---|---|---|---|---|---|---|---|---|---|---|
| 41 | January 2 | Tampa Bay | 1–2 | San Jose | | Askarov | 11,103 | 12–23–6 | 30 | Recap |
| 42 | January 4 | New Jersey | 2–3 | San Jose | | Askarov | 17,435 | 13–23–6 | 32 | Recap |
| 43 | January 7 | Vegas | 4–2 | San Jose | | Georgiev | 10,802 | 13–24–6 | 32 | Recap |
| 44 | January 10 | San Jose | 1–2 | Utah | | Georgiev | 11,131 | 13–25–6 | 32 | Recap |
| 45 | January 11 | Minnesota | 3–1 | San Jose | | Askarov | 17,435 | 13–26–6 | 32 | Recap |
| 46 | January 14 | San Jose | 6–3 | Detroit | | Georgiev | 19,515 | 14–26–6 | 34 | Recap |
| 47 | January 16 | San Jose | 1–4 | Columbus | | Georgiev | 15,943 | 14–27–6 | 34 | Recap |
| 48 | January 18 | San Jose | 1–4 | NY Islanders | | Georgiev | 17,255 | 14–28–6 | 34 | Recap |
| 49 | January 20 | San Jose | 3–6 | Boston | | Askarov | 17,850 | 14–29–6 | 34 | Recap |
| 50 | January 21 | San Jose | 5–7 | Nashville | | Georgiev | 17,159 | 14–30–6 | 34 | Recap |
| 51 | January 23 | Nashville | 6–5 | San Jose | | Askarov | 11,292 | 14–31–6 | 34 | Recap |
| 52 | January 25 | Florida | 7–2 | San Jose | | Georgiev | 17,435 | 14–32–6 | 34 | Recap |
| 53 | January 27 | Pittsburgh | 1–2 | San Jose | | Askarov | 11,625 | 15–32–6 | 36 | Recap |
| 54 | January 30 | San Jose | 2–6 | Seattle | | Askarov | 17,151 | 15–33–6 | 36 | Recap |

February: 0–2–3 (home: 0–1–1; away: 0–1–2)
| # | Date | Visitor | Score | Home | OT | Decision | Attendance | Record | Pts | Recap |
|---|---|---|---|---|---|---|---|---|---|---|
| 55 | February 4 | Montreal | 4–3 | San Jose | | Georgiev | 11,215 | 15–34–6 | 36 | Recap |
| 56 | February 6 | Vancouver | 2–1 | San Jose | OT | Vanecek | 11,509 | 15–34–7 | 37 | Recap |
| 57 | February 8 | Dallas | 8–3 | San Jose | | Vanecek | 17,435 | 15–35–7 | 37 | Recap |
| 58 | February 23 | San Jose | 2–3 | Calgary | | Georgiev | 17,686 | 15–36–7 | 37 | Recap |
| 59 | February 24 | San Jose | 1–2 | Winnipeg | OT | Vanecek | 13,801 | 15–36–8 | 38 | Recap |
| 60 | February 27 | San Jose | 3–4 | Montreal | OT | Georgiev | 21,105 | 15–36–9 | 39 | Recap |

March: 5–7–0 (home: 3–4–0; away: 2–3–0)
| # | Date | Visitor | Score | Home | OT | Decision | Attendance | Record | Pts | Recap |
|---|---|---|---|---|---|---|---|---|---|---|
| 61 | March 1 | San Jose | 3–5 | Ottawa | | Vanecek | 18,602 | 15–37–9 | 39 | Recap |
| 62 | March 3 | San Jose | 3–2 | Toronto | SO | Georgiev | 18,884 | 16–37–9 | 41 | Recap |
| 63 | March 4 | San Jose | 6–2 | Buffalo | | Georgiev | 14,741 | 17–37–9 | 43 | Recap |
| 64 | March 6 | San Jose | 3–7 | Colorado | | Georgiev | 18,077 | 17–38–9 | 43 | Recap |
| 65 | March 8 | NY Islanders | 4–2 | San Jose | | Georgiev | 17,435 | 17–39–9 | 43 | Recap |
| 66 | March 11 | Nashville | 3–2 | San Jose | | Georgiev | 10,523 | 17–40–9 | 43 | Recap |
| 67 | March 13 | Chicago | 2–4 | San Jose | | Georgiev | 13,546 | 18–40–9 | 45 | Recap |
| 68 | March 15 | Washington | 5–1 | San Jose | | Georgiev | 17,435 | 18–41–9 | 45 | Recap |
| 69 | March 20 | Carolina | 3–1 | San Jose | | Romanov | 11,373 | 18–42–9 | 45 | Recap |
| 70 | March 22 | Boston | 1–3 | San Jose | | Georgiev | 17,435 | 19–42–9 | 47 | Recap |
| 71 | March 27 | Toronto | 5–6 | San Jose | SO | Georgiev | 15,514 | 20–42–9 | 49 | Recap |
| 72 | March 29 | NY Rangers | 6–1 | San Jose | | Georgiev | 17,435 | 20–43–9 | 49 | Recap |
| 73 | March 30 | San Jose | 1–8 | Los Angeles | | Romanov | 18,145 | 20–44–9 | 49 | Recap |

April: 0–6–3 (home: 0–4–0; away: 0–2–3)
| # | Date | Visitor | Score | Home | OT | Decision | Attendance | Record | Pts | Recap |
|---|---|---|---|---|---|---|---|---|---|---|
| 74 | April 1 | San Jose | 3–4 | Anaheim | SO | Georgiev | 15,208 | 20–44–10 | 50 | Recap |
| 75 | April 3 | Edmonton | 3–2 | San Jose | | Romanov | 14,152 | 20–45–10 | 50 | Recap |
| 76 | April 5 | Seattle | 5–1 | San Jose | | Georgiev | 17,435 | 20–46–10 | 50 | Recap |
| 77 | April 7 | Calgary | 3–2 | San Jose | | Romanov | 12,654 | 20–47–10 | 50 | Recap |
| 78 | April 9 | San Jose | 7–8 | Minnesota | OT | Georgiev | 18,675 | 20–47–11 | 51 | Recap |
| 79 | April 11 | San Jose | 2–4 | Edmonton | | Romanov | 18,347 | 20–48–11 | 51 | Recap |
| 80 | April 13 | San Jose | 2–5 | Calgary | | Romanov | 17,232 | 20–49–11 | 51 | Recap |
| 81 | April 14 | San Jose | 1–2 | Vancouver | OT | Georgiev | 18,908 | 20–49–12 | 52 | Recap |
| 82 | April 16 | Edmonton | 3–0 | San Jose | | Georgiev | 17,435 | 20–50–12 | 52 | Recap |

Legend: Win Loss Overtime/shootout loss

== Player statistics ==
=== Skaters ===
Regular season
| Player | GP | G | A | Pts | +/− | PIM |
|---|---|---|---|---|---|---|
| Macklin Celebrini | 70 | 25 | 38 | 63 | −31 | 20 |
| William Eklund | 77 | 17 | 41 | 58 | −7 | 29 |
| Tyler Toffoli | 78 | 30 | 24 | 54 | −21 | 14 |
| Will Smith | 74 | 18 | 27 | 45 | −15 | 18 |
| Mikael Granlund^{‡} | 52 | 15 | 30 | 45 | −8 | 20 |
| Fabian Zetterlund^{‡} | 64 | 17 | 19 | 36 | +8 | 10 |
| Alexander Wennberg | 77 | 10 | 25 | 35 | −21 | 14 |
| Jake Walman^{‡} | 50 | 6 | 26 | 32 | −1 | 36 |
| Luke Kunin^{‡} | 63 | 11 | 7 | 18 | −24 | 46 |
| Timothy Liljegren^{†} | 67 | 6 | 11 | 17 | −25 | 36 |
| Mario Ferraro | 78 | 5 | 12 | 17 | −25 | 53 |
| Cody Ceci^{‡} | 54 | 4 | 11 | 15 | −9 | 14 |
| Nico Sturm^{‡} | 47 | 7 | 6 | 13 | −4 | 13 |
| Nikolai Kovalenko^{†} | 29 | 3 | 9 | 12 | −2 | 6 |
| Henry Thrun | 60 | 2 | 10 | 12 | −23 | 30 |
| Collin Graf | 33 | 5 | 6 | 11 | −4 | 8 |
| Jack Thompson | 31 | 4 | 6 | 10 | −9 | 10 |
| Jan Rutta | 54 | 3 | 6 | 9 | −3 | 28 |
| Carl Grundström | 56 | 3 | 6 | 9 | −21 | 24 |
| Shakir Mukhamadullin | 30 | 2 | 7 | 9 | −7 | 8 |
| Barclay Goodrow | 77 | 5 | 3 | 8 | −37 | 75 |
| Ty Dellandrea | 68 | 1 | 7 | 8 | −31 | 59 |
| Klim Kostin | 35 | 1 | 6 | 7 | −6 | 27 |
| Lucas Carlsson | 13 | 1 | 3 | 4 | −2 | 14 |
| Cameron Lund | 11 | 2 | 1 | 3 | −10 | 4 |
| Marc-Edouard Vlasic | 27 | 1 | 2 | 3 | −10 | 2 |
| Walker Duehr | 8 | 2 | 0 | 2 | −5 | 0 |
| Luca Cagnoni | 6 | 0 | 2 | 2 | −4 | 8 |
| Patrick Giles | 8 | 1 | 0 | 1 | −2 | 0 |
| Ethan Cardwell | 6 | 1 | 0 | 1 | −2 | 2 |
| Andrew Poturalski | 3 | 0 | 1 | 1 | −1 | 2 |
| Danil Gushchin | 12 | 0 | 1 | 1 | −3 | 6 |
| Noah Gregor^{†} | 12 | 0 | 1 | 1 | −9 | 11 |
| Thomas Bordeleau | 1 | 0 | 0 | 0 | 0 | 0 |
| Vincent Desharnais^{†} | 7 | 0 | 0 | 0 | 0 | 7 |
| Colin White | 3 | 0 | 0 | 0 | −1 | 0 |
| Givani Smith | 6 | 0 | 0 | 0 | −1 | 10 |
| Zack Ostapchuk | 13 | 0 | 0 | 0 | −1 | 19 |
| Jimmy Schuldt | 8 | 0 | 0 | 0 | −2 | 0 |
| Scott Sabourin | 1 | 0 | 0 | 0 | −2 | 0 |
| Matt Benning^{‡} | 7 | 0 | 0 | 0 | −5 | 4 |

=== Goaltenders ===
Regular season
| Player | GP | GS | TOI | W | L | OT | GA | GAA | SA | SV% | SO | G | A | PIM |
|---|---|---|---|---|---|---|---|---|---|---|---|---|---|---|
| Vítek Vaněček^{‡} | 18 | 17 | 972 | 3 | 10 | 3 | 63 | 3.88 | 533 | .882 | 0 | 0 | 1 | 1 |
| Yaroslav Askarov^{†} | 13 | 12 | 716 | 4 | 6 | 2 | 37 | 3.10 | 357 | .896 | 0 | 0 | 1 | 1 |
| Alexandar Georgiev^{†} | 31 | 30 | 1,730 | 7 | 19 | 4 | 112 | 3.88 | 896 | .875 | 0 | 0 | 0 | 0 |
| Mackenzie Blackwood^{‡} | 19 | 17 | 1,058 | 6 | 9 | 3 | 53 | 3.00 | 583 | .909 | 0 | 0 | 0 | 0 |
| Georgi Romanov | 8 | 6 | 416 | 0 | 6 | 0 | 27 | 3.89 | 219 | .877 | 0 | 0 | 0 | 0 |

^{†}Denotes player spent time with another team before joining the Sharks. Stats reflect time with the Sharks only.
^{‡}Denotes player was traded mid-season. Stats reflect time with the Sharks only.

== Transactions ==
The Sharks have been involved in the following transactions during the 2024–25 season.

=== Key ===
† Contract is entry-level.
‡ Contract initially takes effect in the 2025–26 season.

=== Trades ===
| Date | Details | | Ref |
|---|---|---|---|
| June 29, 2024 | To New Jersey Devils TBL 3rd-round pick in 2024 (#85 overall); 6th-round pick in 2025 | To San Jose Sharks WSH 3rd-round pick in 2024 (#82 overall) | |
| August 18, 2024 | To Edmonton Oilers Ty Emberson | To San Jose Sharks Cody Ceci; EDM 3rd-round pick in 2025 | |
| August 23, 2024 | To Nashville Predators Magnus Chrona; David Edstrom; VGK 1st-round pick in 2025 | To San Jose Sharks Yaroslav Askarov; Nolan Burke; COL 3rd-round pick in 2025 | |
| October 30, 2024 | To Toronto Maple Leafs Matt Benning conditional 3rd-round pick in 2025^{1} 6th-round pick in 2026 | To San Jose Sharks Timothy Liljegren | |
| December 9, 2024 | To Colorado Avalanche Mackenzie Blackwood; Givani Smith; 5th-round pick in 2027 | To San Jose Sharks Alexandar Georgiev; Nikolai Kovalenko conditional 5th-round pick in 2025; 2nd-round pick in 2026 | |
| January 22, 2025 | To Anaheim Ducks Justin Bailey | To San Jose Sharks Pavol Regenda | |
| February 1, 2025 | To Dallas Stars Mikael Granlund; Cody Ceci | To San Jose Sharks 1st-round pick in 2025 conditional 3rd-round pick in 2025 | |
| March 5, 2025 | To Florida Panthers Vitek Vanecek | To San Jose Sharks Patrick Giles | |
| March 5, 2025 | To Pittsburgh Penguins 5th-round pick in 2028 | To San Jose Sharks Vincent Desharnais | |
| March 6, 2025 | To Florida Panthers Nico Sturm 7th-round pick in 2027 | To San Jose Sharks 4th-round pick in 2026 | |
| March 6, 2025 | To Edmonton Oilers Jake Walman | To San Jose Sharks Carl Berglund conditional 1st-round pick in 2026 | |
| March 6, 2025 | To Ottawa Senators Fabian Zetterlund Tristen Robins 4th-round pick in 2025 | To San Jose Sharks Zack Ostapchuk Noah Gregor 2nd-round pick in 2025 | |
| March 6, 2025 | To Columbus Blue Jackets Luke Kunin | To San Jose Sharks 4th-round pick in 2025 | |

==== Notes ====
- Toronto will receive the earliest of two picks that San Jose owns.

=== Players acquired ===
| Date | Player | Former team | Term | Via | Ref |
|---|---|---|---|---|---|
| July 1, 2024 | Lucas Carlsson | Florida Panthers | 2-year | Free agency | |
| July 1, 2024 | Tyler Toffoli | Winnipeg Jets | 4-year | Free agency | |
| July 1, 2024 | Alexander Wennberg | New York Rangers | 2-year | Free agency | |
| July 1, 2024 | Jimmy Schuldt | Seattle Kraken | 1-year | Free agency | |
| July 3, 2024 | Andrew Poturalski | Seattle Kraken | 2-year | Free agency | |
| January 22, 2025 | Walker Duehr | Calgary Flames | 1-year | Waivers | |

=== Players lost ===
| Date | Player | New team | Term | Via | Ref |
|---|---|---|---|---|---|
| July 1, 2024 | Devin Cooley | Calgary Flames | 2-year | Free agency | |
| July 1, 2024 | Jacob MacDonald | Colorado Avalanche | 2-year | Free agency | |
| July 1, 2024 | Jack Studnicka | Los Angeles Kings | 2-year | Free agency | |
| July 2, 2024 | Ryan Carpenter | San Diego Gulls (AHL) | 2-year | Free agency | |
| July 14, 2024 | Jacob Peterson | Rögle BK (SHL) | 3-year | Free agency | |
| August 1, 2024 | Egor Afanasyev | CSKA Moscow (KHL) | 3-year | Free agency | |
| August 1, 2024 | Alexander Barabanov | Ak Bars Kazan (KHL) | 3-year | Free agency | |
| September 2, 2024 | Filip Zadina | HC Davos (NL) | 2-year | Free agency | |
| September 24, 2024 | Eetu Makiniemi | Philadelphia Flyers | 1-year | Free agency | |
| October 5, 2024 | Kevin Labanc | Columbus Blue Jackets | 1-year | Free agency | |
| October 24, 2024 | Calen Addison | Henderson Silver Knights (AHL) | 1-year | Free agency | |
| May 15, 2025 | Carl Berglund | BK Mladá Boleslav (ELH) | 1-year | Free agency | |

=== Signings ===
| Date | Player | Term | Ref |
|---|---|---|---|
| June 30, 2024 | Justin Bailey | 1-year | |
| June 30, 2024 | Luke Kunin | 1-year | |
| July 4, 2024 | Ty Dellandrea | 2-year | |
| July 4, 2024 | Carl Grundstrom | 2-year | |
| July 6, 2024 | Macklin Celebrini | 3-year† | |
| July 10, 2024 | Sam Dickinson | 3-year† | |
| July 11, 2024 | Ty Emberson | 1-year | |
| July 15, 2024 | Brandon Coe | 1-year | |
| July 24, 2024 | Henry Thrun | 2-year | |
| July 26, 2024 | Thomas Bordeleau | 2-year | |
| August 1, 2024 | Igor Chernyshov | 3-year | |
| August 24, 2024 | Yaroslav Askarov | 2-year‡ | |
| January 25, 2025 | Colin White | 1-year | |
| May 9, 2025 | Mattias Hävelid | 3-year | |
| May 19, 2025 | Egor Afanasyev | 1-year | |
| May 29, 2025 | Shakir Mukhamadullin | 1-year | |

== Draft picks ==
Below are the San Jose Sharks' selections at the 2024 NHL entry draft, which was held on June 28 and 29, 2024, in Paradise, Nevada.

| Round | # | Player | Pos | Nationality | College/Junior/Club (League) |
|---|---|---|---|---|---|
| 1 | 1 | Macklin Celebrini | C | Canada | Boston University Terriers (HE) |
| 1 | 11 (Note: The Pittsburgh Penguins' first-round pick will go to the San Jose Sharks as the result of a trade on August 6, 2023, that sent Erik Karlsson, Dillon Hamaliuk and a third-round pick in 2026 to Pittsburgh in exchange for Mikael Granlund, Jan Rutta, Mike Hoffman and this pick (being conditional at the time of the trade). The condition – San Jose will receive a first-round pick in 2024 if Pittsburgh's first-round pick in 2024 is outside of the top ten selections – was converted when the Penguins did not win either draft lottery draw on May 7, 2024. On June 27, the Sharks traded this pick to the Buffalo Sabres with their second-round pick in exchange for a first-round pick.) | Sam Dickinson | D | Canada | London Knights (OHL) |
| 2 | 33 | Igor Chernyshov | LW | Russia | Dynamo Moscow (KHL) |
| 2 | 53 (Note: The Detroit Red Wings' second-round pick will go to the San Jose Sharks as a result of the trade on June 25, 2024, that sent future considerations to Detroit in exchange for Jake Walman, and this pick.) | Leo Sahlin Wallenius | D | Sweden | Växjö U20 (J20 Nationell) |
| 3 | 82 | Carson Wetsch | RW | Canada | Calgary Hitmen (WHL) |
| 4 | 116 | Christian Kirsch | G | Switzerland | EV Zug Jr. (Swiss Jr.) |
| 5 | 131 | Colton Roberts | D | Canada | Vancouver Giants (WHL) |
| 5 | 143 (Note: The Pittsburgh Penguins' fifth-round pick will go to the San Jose Sharks as the result of a trade on March 3, 2023, that sent Tony Sund to Pittsburgh in exchange for a seventh-round pick in 2023 and this pick (being conditional at the time of the trade). The condition – San Jose will receive a fifth-round pick in 2024 if the Penguins do not qualify for the 2023 Eastern Conference Final – was converted on April 12, 2023.) | Nate Misskey | D | Canada | Victoria Royals (WHL) |
| 7 | 194 | Yaroslav Korostelyov | G | Russia | Saint Petersburg Jr. (Russia Jr.) |

== Awards ==
Regular season
| Player | Award | Awarded |
|---|---|---|
| Macklin Celebrini | Rookie of the Month; First star of the week All-Rookie Team | November 2024; December 1, 2024; June 13, 2025 |
