= Ian Moore (ice hockey) =

American ice hockey player (born 2002)

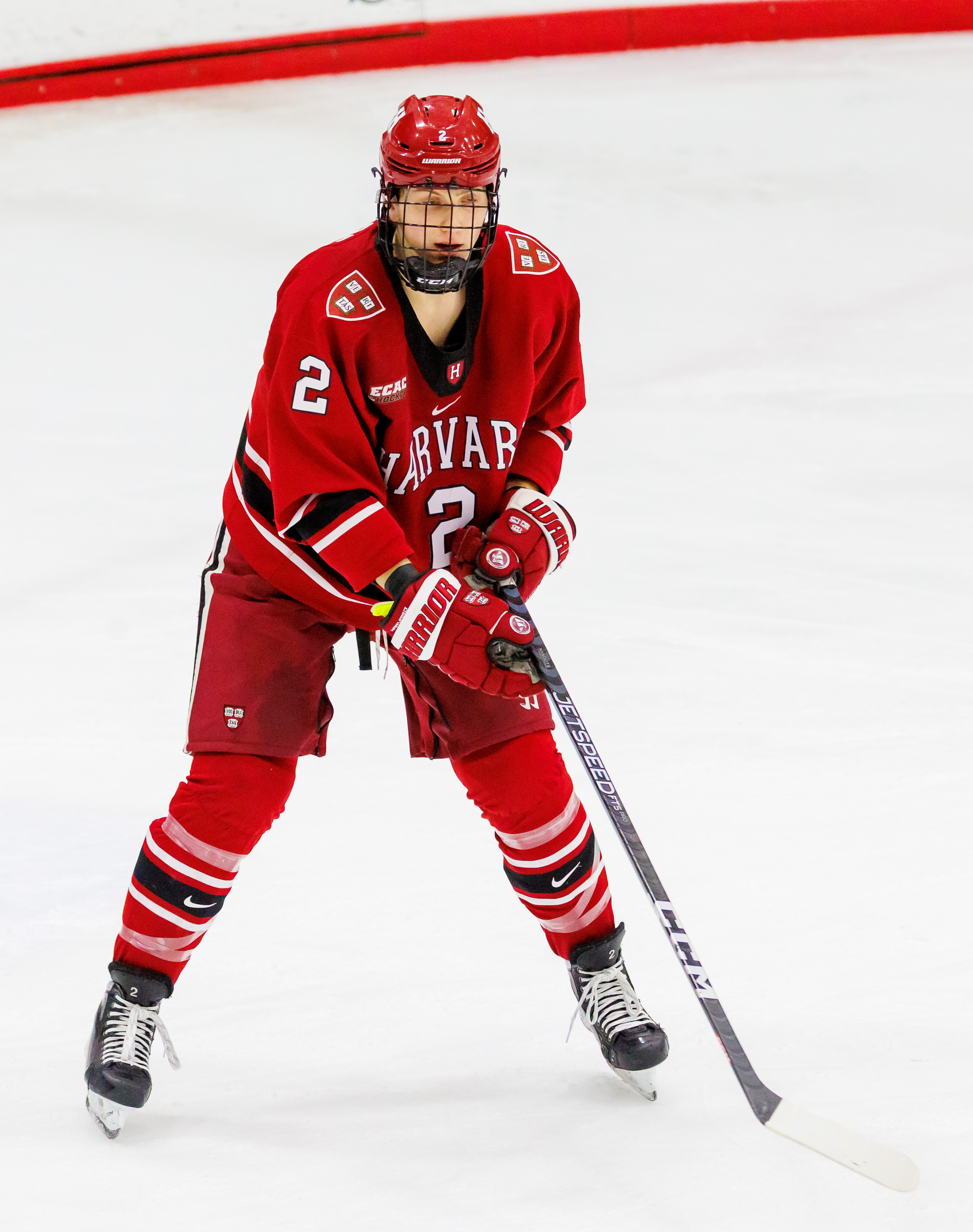
- Moore at Harvard
- Born: January 4, 2002 (age 24) Salt Lake City, Utah, US
- Height: 6 ft 3 in (191 cm)
- Weight: 205 lb (93 kg; 14 st 9 lb)
- Position: Defense
- Shoots: Right
- NHL team: Anaheim Ducks
- NHL draft: 67th overall, 2020; Anaheim Ducks
- Playing career: 2025–present

Ian Moore (born January 4, 2002) is an American professional ice hockey player who is a defenseman for the Anaheim Ducks of the National Hockey League (NHL). He was selected by the Ducks in the third round, 67th overall, of the 2020 NHL entry draft.

== Playing career ==
As a youth, Moore played high school hockey with St. Mark's School in Massachusetts, of the New England Association of Schools and Colleges. Showing two-way potential on the blueline, Moore was selected in his first year of eligibility in the third round, 67th overall, of the 2020 NHL entry draft by the Anaheim Ducks.

While playing junior hockey, Moore moved to the United States Hockey League (USHL) with the Chicago Steel for the 2020–21 season before committing to a collegiate career with Harvard University in the ECAC Hockey. At Harvard, Moore was a member of the Fly Club.

After a four-year collegiate career with the Crimson, Moore was signed to an amateur tryout with the Anaheim Ducks AHL affiliate, the San Diego Gulls, to play out the remainder of the 2024–25 season on March 20, 2025. After contributing with 5 points through 9 appearances, Moore signed a two-year entry-level contract with the Ducks on April 13, 2025. Immediately joining the Ducks roster, Moore made his NHL debut on the same day with the Ducks in a 4-2 defeat against the Colorado Avalanche. He registered his first career NHL point, an assist, in the Ducks season finale, a 2-1 overtime defeat to the Winnipeg Jets on April 16, 2025.

== Career statistics ==
=== Regular season and playoffs ===
			Regular season					Playoffs
Season	Team	League	GP	G	A	Pts	PIM	GP	G	A	Pts	PIM
2017–18	St. Mark's School	USHS	21	1	13	14	—	—	—	—	—	—
2018–19	St. Mark's School	USHS	31	16	20	36	—	—	—	—	—	—
2019–20	St. Mark's School	USHS	28	12	34	46	—	—	—	—	—	—
2019–20	Boston Jr. Bruins	NCDC	2	0	0	0	2	—	—	—	—	—
2020–21	Chicago Steel	USHL	45	10	14	24	16	8	0	3	3	6
2021–22	Harvard University	ECAC	35	2	13	15	10	—	—	—	—	—
2022–23	Harvard University	ECAC	34	1	18	19	12	—	—	—	—	—
2023–24	Harvard University	ECAC	21	3	5	8	10	—	—	—	—	—
2024–25	Harvard University	ECAC	32	3	11	14	14	—	—	—	—	—
2024–25	San Diego Gulls	AHL	9	1	4	5	2	—	—	—	—	—
2024–25	Anaheim Ducks	NHL	3	0	1	1	0	—	—	—	—	—
2025–26	San Diego Gulls	AHL	4	0	0	0	0	—	—	—	—	—
2025–26	Anaheim Ducks	NHL	67	4	8	12	24	10	1	0	1	2
NHL totals			70	4	9	13	24	10	1	0	1	2

=== International ===
Year	Team	Event	Result	GP	G	A	Pts	PIM
2022	United States	WJC	5th	5	0	1	1	0
Junior totals				5	0	1	1	0

== Awards and honors ==
Award	Year	Ref
College
ECAC All-Rookie Team	2021–22	
