= 2024–25 Ottawa Senators season =

Ice hockey team season of play

2024–25 Ottawa Senators
- Division: 4th Atlantic
- Conference: 6th Eastern
- 2024–25 record: 45–30–7
- Home record: 27–11–3
- Road record: 18–19–4
- Goals for: 243
- Goals against: 234

Team information
- General manager: Steve Staios
- Coach: Travis Green
- Captain: Brady Tkachuk
- Alternate captains: Thomas Chabot; Claude Giroux
- Arena: Canadian Tire Centre
- Average attendance: 17,306
- Minor league affiliate: Belleville Senators (AHL)

Team leaders
- Goals: Brady Tkachuk (29)
- Assists: Tim Stützle (55)
- Points: Tim Stützle (79)
- Penalty minutes: Brady Tkachuk (123)
- Plus/minus: Nick Jensen (+18)
- Wins: Linus Ullmark (25)
- Goals against average: Leevi Merilainen (1.99)

The 2024–25 Ottawa Senators season was the 33rd season of the Ottawa Senators of the National Hockey League (NHL). The Senators entered the season with a new coaching staff. It was their first winning season since the 2016–17 season. The Senators finished with 97 points, good for fourth in the Atlantic Division, sixth in the Conference, and in the first wildcard spot to qualify for the playoffs, their first in eight seasons. Facing the Toronto Maple Leafs in their opening round best-of-seven series, the Senators were eliminated in six games.

== Off-season ==
On May 7, 2024, the Senators announced their new head coach Travis Green, a former head coach with the Vancouver Canucks, and former NHL player. The team filled out their coaching positions by returning Daniel Alfredsson and Ben Sexton and adding Mike Yeo and Nolan Baumgartner as assistant coaches.

Personnel changes included the Senators trading Jakob Chychrun to the Washington Capitals for Nick Jensen and a draft pick, and trading Joonas Korpisalo, Mark Kastelic and a draft pick to the Boston Bruins for Linus Ullmark and trading Mathieu Joseph to the St. Louis Blues. Free agent players added included Michael Amadio, Nick Cousins, Adam Gaudette, Noah Gregor and David Perron.

On July 31, the Allen Americans, the ECHL affiliate of the Senators for the previous two seasons, announced a new affiliation with the Utah Hockey Club, leaving the Senators without an ECHL affiliate.

== Regular season ==
This was an up-and-down season for the Senators. The team slumped in November and February before recovering in March and April to qualify for their first playoffs since 2017.

The Senators made two moves at the March trade deadline. The team traded Josh Norris and Jacob Bernard-Docker to Buffalo for Dylan Cozens and Dennis Gilbert and a draft pick. The team also picked up Fabian Zetterlund and Tristen Robins from the San Jose Sharks for Zack Ostapchuk and Noah Gregor, with an exchange of draft picks.

=== Divisional standings ===
Atlantic Division
Pos	Team	GP	W	L	OTL	RW	GF	GA	GD	Pts
1	y – Toronto Maple Leafs	82	52	26	4	41	268	231	+37	108
2	x – Tampa Bay Lightning	82	47	27	8	41	294	219	+75	102
3	x – Florida Panthers	82	47	31	4	37	252	223	+29	98
4	x – Ottawa Senators	82	45	30	7	35	243	234	+9	97
5	x – Montreal Canadiens	82	40	31	11	30	245	265	−20	91
6	Detroit Red Wings	82	39	35	8	30	238	259	−21	86
7	Buffalo Sabres	82	36	39	7	29	269	289	−20	79
8	Boston Bruins	82	33	39	10	26	222	272	−50	76

Source: National Hockey League
Rules for classification: 1) Fewer number of games played (GP, only during regular season); 2) Greater number of regulation wins (RW); 3) Greater number of wins in regulation and overtime, excluding shootout wins (ROW); 4) Greater number of total wins, including shootouts (W); 5) Greater number of points earned in head-to-head play; if teams played an uneven number of head-to-head games, the result of the first game on the home ice of the team with the extra home game is discarded; 6) Greater goal differential (GD); 7) Greater number of goals scored (GF)
x – Clinched playoff spot; y – Clinched division

=== Conference standings ===
Eastern Conference Wild Card
Pos	Div	Team	GP	W	L	OTL	RW	GF	GA	GD	Pts
1	AT	x – Ottawa Senators	82	45	30	7	35	243	234	+9	97
2	AT	x – Montreal Canadiens	82	40	31	11	30	245	265	−20	91
3	ME	Columbus Blue Jackets	82	40	33	9	30	273	268	+5	89
4	AT	Detroit Red Wings	82	39	35	8	30	238	259	−21	86
5	ME	New York Rangers	82	39	36	7	35	256	255	+1	85
6	ME	New York Islanders	82	35	35	12	28	224	260	−36	82
7	ME	Pittsburgh Penguins	82	34	36	12	24	243	293	−50	80
8	AT	Buffalo Sabres	82	36	39	7	29	269	289	−20	79
9	AT	Boston Bruins	82	33	39	10	26	222	272	−50	76
10	ME	Philadelphia Flyers	82	33	39	10	21	238	286	−48	76

Source: National Hockey League
Rules for classification: 1) Fewer number of games played (GP, only during regular season); 2) Greater number of regulation wins (RW); 3) Greater number of wins in regulation and overtime, excluding shootout wins (ROW); 4) Greater number of total wins, including shootouts (W); 5) Greater number of points earned in head-to-head play; if teams played an uneven number of head-to-head games, the result of the first game on the home ice of the team with the extra home game is discarded; 6) Greater goal differential (GD); 7) Greater number of goals scored (GF)
x – Clinched playoff spot

== Playoffs ==
=== Eastern Conference First round: Ottawa vs Toronto ===
As a wild-card team, the Senators had to open their series on the road against the Atlantic Division champion Toronto Maple Leafs. The Senators dropped the two games at Toronto, and the first home game in Ottawa before winning their first playoff game. The Senators then won the next game in Toronto, before falling in the sixth game at home.

== Schedule and results ==
=== Preseason ===
The pre-season schedule was published on June 24, 2024.

2024 preseason game log: 5–1–1 (home: 2–1–1; road: 3–0–0)
#	Date	Visitor	Score	Home	OT	Decision	Attendance	Record	Recap
1	September 22	Ottawa	6–5	Toronto	OT	Sogaard	14,531	1–0–0
2	September 24	Toronto	1–2	Ottawa		Forsberg	14,408	2–0–0
3	September 26	Buffalo	3–2	Ottawa	OT	Ullmark	13,411	2–0–1
4	September 29^{A}	Pittsburgh	5–2	Ottawa		Forsberg	4,640	2–1–1
5	October 1	Ottawa	4–3	Montreal		Ullmark	20,983	3–1–1
6	October 4	Ottawa	4–3	Detroit	OT	Forsberg	10,080	4–1–1
7	October 5	Montreal	2–4	Ottawa		Ullmark	16,266	5–1–1
Notes:^{A} Game played at the Sudbury Community Arena in Sudbury, Ontario.

=== Regular season ===
The Ottawa Senators regular season schedule was released on July 2, 2024.

2024–25 game log

October: 5–4–0 (home: 4–1–0; road: 1–3–0)
#	Date	Visitor	Score	Home	OT	Decision	Attendance	Record	Pts	Recap
1	October 10	Florida	1–3	Ottawa		Ullmark	19,346	1–0–0	2
2	October 12	Ottawa	1–4	Montreal		Ullmark	21,105	1–1–0	2
3	October 14	Los Angeles	7–8	Ottawa	OT	Sogaard	16,788	2–1–0	4
4	October 17	New Jersey	3–1	Ottawa		Forsberg	15,192	2–2–0	4
5	October 19	Tampa Bay	4–5	Ottawa		Forsberg	16,188	3–2–0	6
6	October 22	Ottawa	4–0	Utah		Forsberg	11,131	4–2–0	8
7	October 25	Ottawa	4–6	Vegas		Ullmark	17,564	4–3–0	8
8	October 27	Ottawa	4–5	Colorado		Forsberg	18,020	4–4–0	8
9	October 29	St. Louis	1–8	Ottawa		Ullmark	15,784	5–4–0	10

November: 5–8–1 (home: 2–4–1; road: 3–4–0)
#	Date	Visitor	Score	Home	OT	Decision	Attendance	Record	Pts	Recap
10	November 1	Ottawa	1–2	NY Rangers		Ullmark	18,006	5–5–0	10
11	November 2	Seattle	0–3	Ottawa		Forsberg	17,274	6–5–0	12
12	November 5	Ottawa	1–5	Buffalo		Ullmark	12,260	6–6–0	12
13	November 7	NY Islanders	4–2	Ottawa		Forsberg	15,677	6–7–0	12
14	November 9	Ottawa	3–2	Boston	OT	Ullmark	17,850	7–7–0	14
15	November 12	Ottawa	3–0	Toronto		Ullmark	18,648	8–7–0	16
16	November 14	Philadelphia	5–4	Ottawa	OT	Ullmark	17,162	8–7–1	17
17	November 16	Ottawa	0–4	Carolina		Forsberg	18,808	8–8–1	17
18	November 19	Edmonton	5–2	Ottawa		Ullmark	18,676	8–9–1	17
19	November 21	Vegas	3–2	Ottawa		Ullmark	16,822	8–10–1	17
20	November 23	Vancouver	4–3	Ottawa		Ullmark	18,995	8–11–1	17
21	November 25	Calgary	3–4	Ottawa		Forsberg	17,196	9–11–1	19
22	November 27	Ottawa	4–3	San Jose		Ullmark	10,778	10–11–1	21
23	November 30	Ottawa	2–5	Los Angeles		Forsberg	16,808	10–12–1	21

December: 9–3–1 (home: 4–1–0; road: 5–2–1)
#	Date	Visitor	Score	Home	OT	Decision	Attendance	Record	Pts	Recap
24	December 1	Ottawa	3–4	Anaheim	SO	Ullmark	15,144	10–12–2	22
25	December 5	Detroit	1–2	Ottawa		Ullmark	16,739	11–12–2	24
26	December 7	Nashville	1–3	Ottawa		Ullmark	16,741	12–12–2	26
27	December 8	NY Islanders	4–2	Ottawa		Forsberg	15,878	12–13–2	26
28	December 11	Anaheim	1–5	Ottawa		Ullmark	16,893	13–13–2	28
29	December 13	Ottawa	3–0	Carolina		Ullmark	18,700	14–13–2	30
30	December 14	Pittsburgh	2–3	Ottawa	OT	Ullmark	18,892	15–13–2	32
31	December 17	Ottawa	3–0	Seattle		Ullmark	17,151	16–13–2	34
32	December 19	Ottawa	3–2	Calgary	OT	Ullmark	17,271	17–13–2	36
33	December 21	Ottawa	5–4	Vancouver	OT	Merilainen	18,940	18–13–2	38
34	December 22	Ottawa	1–3	Edmonton		Merilainen	18,347	18–14–2	38
35	December 28	Ottawa	2–4	Winnipeg		Sogaard	14,734	18–15–2	38
36	December 29	Ottawa	3–1	Minnesota		Merilainen	18,989	19–15–2	40

January: 8–5–2 (home: 5–1–1; road: 3–4–1)
#	Date	Visitor	Score	Home	OT	Decision	Attendance	Record	Pts	Recap
37	January 2	Ottawa	2–4	Dallas		Merilainen	18,532	19–16–2	40
38	January 3	Ottawa	0–4	St. Louis		Forsberg	18,096	19–17–2	40
39	January 7	Ottawa	2–3	Detroit	OT	Forsberg	19,515	19–17–3	41
40	January 9	Buffalo	4–0	Ottawa		Forsberg	16,276	19–18–3	41
41	January 11	Ottawa	5–0	Pittsburgh		Merilainen	18,043	20–18–3	43
42	January 12	Dallas	2–3	Ottawa		Merilainen	17,653	21–18–3	45
43	January 14	Ottawa	2–0	NY Islanders		Merilainen	15,101	22–18–3	47
44	January 16	Washington	1–0	Ottawa	OT	Merilainen	17,242	22–18–4	48
45	January 18	Boston	5–6	Ottawa	SO	Merilainen	18,768	23–18–4	50
46	January 19	Ottawa	2–1	New Jersey		Forsberg	16,514	24–18–4	52
47	January 21	Ottawa	0–5	NY Rangers		Merilainen	17,662	24–19–4	52
48	January 23	Ottawa	0–2	Boston		Forsberg	17,850	24–20–4	52
49	January 25	Toronto	1–2	Ottawa		Forsberg	18,818	25–20–4	54
50	January 26	Utah	1–3	Ottawa		Merilainen	16,897	26–20–4	56
51	January 30	Washington	4–5	Ottawa	OT	Forsberg	18,792	27–20–4	58

February: 2–5–0 (home: 1–2–0; road: 1–3–0)
#	Date	Visitor	Score	Home	OT	Decision	Attendance	Record	Pts	Recap
52	February 1	Minnesota	0–6	Ottawa		Merilainen	18,822	28–20–4	60
53	February 3	Ottawa	5–2	Nashville		Forsberg	17,159	29–20–4	62
54	February 4	Ottawa	3–4	Tampa Bay		Ullmark	19,092	29–21–4	62
55	February 6	Ottawa	1–5	Tampa Bay		Forsberg	19,092	29–22–4	62
56	February 8	Ottawa	1–5	Florida		Ullmark	19,660	29–23–4	62
57	February 22	Montreal	5–2	Ottawa		Ullmark	18,840	29–24–4	62
58	February 26	Winnipeg	4–1	Ottawa		Ullmark	17,831	29–25–4	62

March: 10–3–2 (home: 5–1–0; road: 5–2–2)
#	Date	Visitor	Score	Home	OT	Decision	Attendance	Record	Pts	Recap
59	March 1	San Jose	3–5	Ottawa		Ullmark	18,602	30–25–4	64
60	March 3	Ottawa	4–5	Washington	SO	Ullmark	18,573	30–25–5	65
61	March 5	Ottawa	4–3	Chicago	OT	Ullmark	17,432	31–25–5	67
62	March 8	NY Rangers	3–4	Ottawa	OT	Ullmark	18,224	32–25–5	69
63	March 10	Detroit	1–2	Ottawa		Ullmark	18,651	33–25–5	71
64	March 11	Ottawa	5–2	Philadelphia		Forsberg	18,201	34–25–5	73
65	March 13	Boston	3–6	Ottawa		Ullmark	17,458	35–25–5	75
66	March 15	Ottawa	4–2	Toronto		Ullmark	19,170	36–25–5	77
67	March 18	Ottawa	3–6	Montreal		Ullmark	21,105	36–26–5	77
68	March 20	Colorado	5–1	Ottawa		Ullmark	17,856	36–27–5	77
69	March 22	Ottawa	3–2	New Jersey		Ullmark	16,514	37–27–5	79
70	March 25	Ottawa	2–3	Buffalo		Forsberg	13,955	37–28–5	79
71	March 27	Ottawa	4–3	Detroit		Ullmark	19,515	38–28–5	81
72	March 29	Columbus	2–3	Ottawa		Ullmark	17,758	39–28–5	83
73	March 30	Ottawa	0–1	Pittsburgh	OT	Forsberg	16,016	39–28–6	84

April: 6–2–1 (home: 6–1–1; road: 0–1–0)
#	Date	Visitor	Score	Home	OT	Decision	Attendance	Record	Pts	Recap
74	April 1	Buffalo	5–2	Ottawa		Ullmark	16,446	39–29–6	84
75	April 3	Tampa Bay	1–2	Ottawa		Ullmark	15,187	40–29–6	86
76	April 5	Florida	0–3	Ottawa		Forsberg	18,611	41–29–6	88
77	April 6	Columbus	0–4	Ottawa		Ullmark	15,616	42–29–6	90
78	April 8	Ottawa	2–5	Columbus		Forsberg	15,188	42–30–6	90
79	April 11	Montreal	2–5	Ottawa		Ullmark	18,685	43–30–6	92
80	April 13	Philadelphia	3–4	Ottawa	OT	Forsberg	16,059	44–30–6	94
81	April 15	Chicago	4–3	Ottawa	OT	Forsberg	14,115	44–30–7	95
82	April 17	Carolina	5–7	Ottawa		Ullmark	16,193	45–30–7	97

Legend: Win (2 points) Loss (0 points) Overtime/shootout loss (1 point)

=== Playoffs ===
2025 Stanley Cup playoffs

Eastern Conference First Round vs. (A1) Toronto Maple Leafs: Toronto wins series 4–2
#	Date	Visitor	Score	Home	OT	Decision	Attendance	Series	Recap
1	April 20	Ottawa	2–6	Toronto		Ullmark	19,072	0–1
2	April 22	Ottawa	2–3	Toronto	OT	Ullmark	19,333	0–2
3	April 24	Toronto	3–2	Ottawa	OT	Ullmark	19,073	0–3
4	April 26	Toronto	3–4	Ottawa	OT	Ullmark	19,094	1–3
5	April 29	Ottawa	4–0	Toronto		Ullmark	19,438	2–3
6	May 1	Toronto	4–2	Ottawa		Ullmark	19,007	2–4

Legend: Win Loss

== Player statistics ==
Final stats

=== Skaters ===
Regular season
Player	GP	G	A	Pts	+/−	PIM
Tim Stützle	82	24	55	79	0	46
Drake Batherson	82	26	42	68	-9	30
Jake Sanderson	80	11	46	57	-14	12
Brady Tkachuk	72	29	26	55	0	123
Claude Giroux	81	15	35	50	-8	18
Thomas Chabot	80	9	36	45	+17	24
Shane Pinto	70	21	16	37	+10	26
Ridly Greig	78	13	21	34	-11	60
Josh Norris^{‡}	53	20	13	33	-5	34
Michael Amadio	72	11	16	27	+12	18
Adam Gaudette	81	19	7	26	+12	12
Nick Jensen	71	3	18	21	+18	6
David Perron	43	9	7	16	-7	12
Dylan Cozens^{†}	21	5	11	16	-4	6
Nick Cousins	50	6	9	15	-1	41
Artyom Zub	56	2	11	13	+3	34
Tyler Kleven	79	4	6	10	-11	27
Travis Hamonic	59	1	6	7	-16	19
Noah Gregor^{‡}	40	4	2	6	-12	17
Matthew Highmore	41	2	4	6	-5	10
Fabian Zetterlund^{†}	20	2	3	5	-1	4
Jacob Bernard-Docker^{‡}	25	1	3	4	+2	4
Zack Ostapchuk^{‡}	43	1	3	4	-7	26
Nikolas Matinpalo	41	1	3	4	-2	20
Zack MacEwen	21	2	1	3	0	21
Cole Reinhardt	17	1	1	2	-4	15
Angus Crookshank	8	0	1	1	-1	0
Dennis Gilbert^{†}	4	0	1	1	0	0
Donovan Sebrango	2	0	0	0	-1	0
Jan Jenik	2	0	0	0	-1	0
Hayden Hodgson	2	0	0	0	-2	5

Playoffs
Player	GP	G	A	Pts	+/−	PIM
Brady Tkachuk	6	4	3	7	+2	6
Tim Stützle	6	2	3	5	+1	2
Claude Giroux	6	1	4	5	+3	0
Thomas Chabot	6	1	3	4	+1	2
David Perron	6	2	1	3	+1	4
Jake Sanderson	6	1	2	3	-1	2
Adam Gaudette	6	1	2	3	+2	4
Drake Batherson	6	1	1	2	-4	10
Shane Pinto	6	1	1	2	-1	2
Dylan Cozens	6	1	1	2	-2	12
Tyler Kleven	6	0	2	2	0	6
Ridly Greig	6	1	0	1	-1	8
Michael Amadio	6	0	1	1	-2	2
Artyom Zub	6	0	1	1	0	2
Nick Jensen	6	0	0	0	-1	2
Fabian Zetterlund	6	0	0	0	0	0
Nikolas Matinpalo	6	0	0	0	+1	2
Nick Cousins	5	0	0	0	0	0
Matthew Highmore	1	0	0	0	-1	4

=== Goaltenders ===
Regular season
Player	GP	GS	TOI	W	L	OT	GA	GAA	SA	SV%	SO	G	A	PIM
Linus Ullmark	44	43	2467:17	25	14	3	112	2.72	1229	.910	4	0	2	0
Anton Forsberg	30	27	1676:32	11	12	3	76	2.72	768	.901	3	0	0	0
Leevi Merilainen	12	11	662:59	8	3	1	22	1.99	285	.925	3	0	0	0
Mads Sogaard	2	1	91:33	1	1	0	8	5.24	40	.800	0	0	0	2

Playoffs
Player	GP	GS	TOI	W	L	GA	GAA	SA	SV%	SO	G	A	PIM
Linus Ullmark	6	6	380:02	2	4	18	2.84	150	.880	1	0	0	0

^{†}Denotes player spent time with another team before joining the Senators. Stats reflect time with the Senators only.
^{‡}No longer with the Senators.

== Awards and milestones ==
=== Milestones ===
Player	Milestone	Date	Ref.
Cole Reinhardt	1st NHL assist 1st NHL point	October 25, 2024	
Nick Cousins	600th NHL game	October 27, 2024	
Thomas Chabot	200th NHL assist	October 27, 2024	
Zack Ostapchuk	1st NHL assist 1st NHL point	October 29, 2024	
Ridly Greig	100th NHL game	November 2, 2024	
Tim Stützle	300th NHL game	November 12, 2024	
Josh Norris	200th NHL game	November 16, 2024	
Claude Giroux	1,200th NHL game	November 19, 2024	
Tim Stützle	100th NHL goal	November 23, 2024	
Cole Reinhardt	1st NHL goal	November 25, 2024	
Tyler Kleven	1st NHL goal	November 27, 2024	
Brady Tkachuk	200th NHL assist	November 27, 2024	
Drake Batherson	100th NHL goal	December 11, 2024	
Michael Amadio	400th NHL game	December 17, 2024	
Leevi Merilainen	1st NHL win	December 21, 2024	
Nick Jensen	600th NHL game	January 3, 2025	
Leevi Merilainen	1st NHL shutout	January 11, 2025	
Jake Sanderson	200th NHL game	January 16, 2025	
Donovan Sebrango	1st NHL game	January 16, 2025	
Zack Ostapchuk	1st NHL goal	January 19, 2025	
Claude Giroux	1,100th NHL point	January 30, 2025	
Jake Sanderson	100th NHL point	February 1, 2025	
Tim Stützle	300th NHL point	February 3, 2025	
Tim Stützle	200th NHL assist	March 3, 2025	
Brady Tkachuk	500th NHL game	March 8, 2025	
Brady Tkachuk	400th NHL point	March 11, 2025	
Dylan Cozens	200th NHL point	March 11, 2025	
Nikolas Matinpalo	1st NHL assist 1st NHL point	March 13, 2025	
Thomas Chabot	500th NHL game	March 22, 2025	
Shane Pinto	200th NHL game 100th NHL point	March 29, 2025	
Artyom Zub	300th NHL game	April 3, 2025	
Nikolas Matinpalo	1st NHL goal	April 6, 2025	
Thomas Chabot	300th NHL point	April 11, 2025	
Jake Sanderson	100th NHL assist	April 11, 2025	
Adam Gaudette	300th NHL game	April 15, 2025	
Travis Hamonic	900th NHL game	April 17, 2025	

== Transactions ==
The Senators have been involved in the following transactions during the 2024–25 season.

=== Trades ===
Date	Details		Ref
July 1, 2024	To Washington Capitals Jakob Chychrun	To Ottawa Senators Nick Jensen; 3rd-round pick in 2026	
July 2, 2024	To St. Louis Blues Mathieu Joseph; 3rd-round pick in 2025	To Ottawa Senators Future considerations	
July 3, 2024	To Utah Hockey Club Egor Sokolov	To Ottawa Senators Jan Jenik	
July 15, 2024	To Colorado Avalanche Kevin Mandolese; 7th-round pick in 2026	To Ottawa Senators 6th-round pick in 2026	
July 15, 2024	To Edmonton Oilers Roby Jarventie; 4th-round pick in 2025	To Ottawa Senators Xavier Bourgault; Jake Chiasson	
March 7, 2025	To Buffalo Sabres Jacob Bernard-Docker; Josh Norris	To Ottawa Senators Dylan Cozens; Dennis Gilbert; 2nd-round pick in 2026	
March 7, 2025	To San Jose Sharks Noah Gregor; Zack Ostapchuk; 2nd-round pick in 2025	To Ottawa Senators Tristen Robins; Fabian Zetterlund; 4th-round pick in 2025	

=== Players acquired ===
Date	Player	Former team	Term	Via	Ref
July 1, 2024	Michael Amadio	Vegas Golden Knights	3-year	Free agency	
July 1, 2024	Jeremy Davies	Buffalo Sabres	1-year	Free agency	
July 1, 2024	Noah Gregor	Toronto Maple Leafs	1-year	Free agency	
July 1, 2024	David Perron	Detroit Red Wings	2-year	Free agency	
July 2, 2024	Adam Gaudette	St. Louis Blues	1-year	Free agency	
July 2, 2024	Hayden Hodgson	Los Angeles Kings	1-year	Free agency	
July 2, 2024	Filip Roos	Chicago Blackhawks	1-year	Free agency	
August 29, 2024	Nick Cousins	Florida Panthers	1-year	Free agency	
June 15, 2025	Lassi Thomson	Malmö Redhawks (SHL)	1-year‡	Free agency	

=== Players lost ===
Date	Player	New team	Term	Via	Ref
July 1, 2024	Bokondji Imama	Pittsburgh Penguins	1-year	Free agency	
July 1, 2024	Parker Kelly	Colorado Avalanche	2-year	Free agency	
July 2, 2024	Erik Brannstrom	Colorado Avalanche	1-year	Free agency	
July 2, 2024	Dillon Heatherington	San Diego Gulls (AHL)	1-year	Free agency	
July 19, 2024	Rourke Chartier	Kunlun Red Star (KHL)	1-year	Free agency	
July 25, 2024	Josh Currie	Kölner Haie (DEL)	1-year	Free agency	
September 4, 2024	Dominik Kubalik	HC Ambrì-Piotta (NL)	1-year	Free agency	
October 8, 2024	Boris Katchouk	Wilkes-Barre/Scranton Penguins (AHL)	1-year	Free agency	
May 11, 2025	Filip Roos	Färjestad BK (SHL)	2-year‡	Free agency	

=== Player signings ===
Date	Player	Term	Ref
July 1, 2024	Garrett Pilon	2-year	
July 2, 2024	Shane Pinto	2-year	
July 3, 2024	Matthew Andonovski	3-year†	
July 5, 2024	Jan Jenik	1-year	
July 15, 2024	Mads Sogaard	2-year	
August 6, 2024	Carter Yakemchuk	3-year†	
October 9, 2024	Linus Ullmark	4-year‡	
January 10, 2025	Ridly Greig	4-year‡	
May 5, 2025	Nikolas Matinpalo	2-year‡	
May 20, 2025	Luke Ellinas	3-year†‡	
June 2, 2025	Tyler Kleven	2-year‡	
June 19, 2025	Fabian Zetterlund	3-year‡	

==== Key ====
† Contract is entry-level.
‡ Contract takes effect in the 2025–26 season.

== Draft picks ==
The 2024 NHL entry draft was held June 28–29, 2024, in Las Vegas, Nevada, United States. The Senators made six draft picks. The Senators held the Boston Bruins' first-round pick, but traded it just before the draft for Linus Ullmark.

The Senators' third-round pick went to the Chicago Blackhawks as the result of a trade on July 7, 2022, that sent Alex DeBrincat to Ottawa in exchange for a first and second-round pick in 2022 and this pick. The Senators' sixth-round pick went to the Carolina Hurricanes as the result of a trade on March 15, 2024, that sent Jamieson Rees to Ottawa. The Senators' seventh-round pick went to the Toronto Maple Leafs as the result of a trade on July 11, 2022, that sent future considerations to Ottawa in exchange for Matt Murray, a third-round pick in 2023 and this pick.

The Detroit Red Wings' fourth-round pick went to the Senators as the result of a trade on July 9, 2023, that sent Alex DeBrincat to Detroit in exchange for Dominik Kubalik, Donovan Sebrango, a conditional first-round pick in 2024 and this pick. The Tampa Bay Lightning's fourth-round pick went to the Senators as the result of a trade on March 20, 2022, that sent Nick Paul to Tampa Bay in exchange for Mathieu Joseph and this pick.

Round	Overall	Player	Position	Nationality	Club team
1	7	Carter Yakemchuk	D	Canada	Calgary Hitmen (WHL)
2	39	Gabriel Eliasson	D	Sweden	HV71 J20 (J20 Nationell)
4	104	Lucas Ellinas	C	Canada	Kitchener Rangers (OHL)
4	112 (Note: (from Detroit))	Javon Moore	LW	United States	Minnetonka High School (USHS-MN)
4	117 (Note: (from Tampa Bay))	Blake Montgomery	LW	United States	Lincoln Stars (USHL)
5	136	Eerik Wallenius	D	Finland	HPK (Liiga)
