= 2024–25 Chicago Blackhawks season =

National Hockey League season

2024–25 Chicago Blackhawks
- Division: 8th Central
- Conference: 15th Western
- 2024–25 record: 25–46–11
- Home record: 15–20–6
- Road record: 10–26–5
- Goals for: 226
- Goals against: 296

Team information
- General manager: Kyle Davidson
- Coach: Luke Richardson (Oct. 8 – Dec. 5); Anders Sorensen (interim, Dec. 5 – Apr. 15)
- Captain: Nick Foligno
- Alternate captains: Seth Jones (Oct. 8 – Mar. 1); Alec Martinez (Mar. 1 – Apr. 15); Connor Murphy
- Arena: United Center
- Average attendance: 19,130
- Minor league affiliates: Rockford IceHogs (AHL); Indy Fuel (ECHL)

Team leaders
- Goals: Ryan Donato (29)
- Assists: Teuvo Teravainen (42)
- Points: Connor Bedard (60)
- Penalty minutes: Patrick Maroon (97)
- Plus/minus: Ilya Mikheyev; Sam Rinzel (+2)
- Wins: Petr Mrazek (10)
- Goals against average: Spencer Knight (3.01)

The 2024–25 Chicago Blackhawks season was the 99th season (98th season of play) for the National Hockey League (NHL) franchise that was established on September 25, 1926.

On December 5, 2024, the Blackhawks fired head coach Luke Richardson and named Anders Sorensen the interim head coach.

On March 20, 2025, the Blackhawks were eliminated from playoff contention for the fifth straight season following a loss to the Los Angeles Kings.

== Off-season ==
=== Broadcasting change ===
On June 3, 2024, The Blackhawks announced they would not renew their contract with NBC Sports Chicago and join the newly established Chicago Sports Network along with the Chicago Bulls and Chicago White Sox. The network is available on cable providers, streaming services, and over-the-air.

== Standings ==
=== Divisional standings ===
Central Division
| Pos | Team | GP | W | L | OTL | RW | GF | GA | GD | Pts |
|---|---|---|---|---|---|---|---|---|---|---|
| 1 | p – Winnipeg Jets | 82 | 56 | 22 | 4 | 43 | 277 | 191 | +86 | 116 |
| 2 | x – Dallas Stars | 82 | 50 | 26 | 6 | 41 | 277 | 224 | +53 | 106 |
| 3 | x – Colorado Avalanche | 82 | 49 | 29 | 4 | 40 | 277 | 234 | +43 | 102 |
| 4 | x – Minnesota Wild | 82 | 45 | 30 | 7 | 33 | 228 | 239 | −11 | 97 |
| 5 | x – St. Louis Blues | 82 | 44 | 30 | 8 | 32 | 254 | 233 | +21 | 96 |
| 6 | Utah Hockey Club | 82 | 38 | 31 | 13 | 30 | 241 | 251 | −10 | 89 |
| 7 | Nashville Predators | 82 | 30 | 44 | 8 | 24 | 214 | 274 | −60 | 68 |
| 8 | Chicago Blackhawks | 82 | 25 | 46 | 11 | 20 | 226 | 296 | −70 | 61 |

Source: National Hockey League
Rules for classification: 1) Fewer number of games played (GP, only during regular season); 2) Greater number of regulation wins (RW); 3) Greater number of wins in regulation and overtime, excluding shootout wins (ROW); 4) Greater number of total wins, including shootouts (W); 5) Greater number of points earned in head-to-head play; if teams played an uneven number of head-to-head games, the result of the first game on the home ice of the team with the extra home game is discarded; 6) Greater goal differential (GD); 7) Greater number of goals scored (GF)
p – Clinched Presidents' Trophy; x – Clinched playoff spot

=== Conference standings ===
Western Conference Wild Card
| Pos | Div | Team | GP | W | L | OTL | RW | GF | GA | GD | Pts |
|---|---|---|---|---|---|---|---|---|---|---|---|
| 1 | CE | x – Minnesota Wild | 82 | 45 | 30 | 7 | 33 | 228 | 239 | −11 | 97 |
| 2 | CE | x – St. Louis Blues | 82 | 44 | 30 | 8 | 32 | 254 | 233 | +21 | 96 |
| 3 | PA | Calgary Flames | 82 | 41 | 27 | 14 | 31 | 225 | 238 | −13 | 96 |
| 4 | PA | Vancouver Canucks | 82 | 38 | 30 | 14 | 28 | 236 | 253 | −17 | 90 |
| 5 | CE | Utah Hockey Club | 82 | 38 | 31 | 13 | 30 | 241 | 251 | −10 | 89 |
| 6 | PA | Anaheim Ducks | 82 | 35 | 37 | 10 | 24 | 221 | 263 | −42 | 80 |
| 7 | PA | Seattle Kraken | 82 | 35 | 41 | 6 | 28 | 247 | 265 | −18 | 76 |
| 8 | CE | Nashville Predators | 82 | 30 | 44 | 8 | 24 | 214 | 274 | −60 | 68 |
| 9 | CE | Chicago Blackhawks | 82 | 25 | 46 | 11 | 20 | 226 | 296 | −70 | 61 |
| 10 | PA | San Jose Sharks | 82 | 20 | 50 | 12 | 14 | 210 | 315 | −105 | 52 |

Source: National Hockey League
Rules for classification: 1) Fewer number of games played (GP, only during regular season); 2) Greater number of regulation wins (RW); 3) Greater number of wins in regulation and overtime, excluding shootout wins (ROW); 4) Greater number of total wins, including shootouts (W); 5) Greater number of points earned in head-to-head play; if teams played an uneven number of head-to-head games, the result of the first game on the home ice of the team with the extra home game is discarded; 6) Greater goal differential (GD); 7) Greater number of goals scored (GF)
x – Clinched playoff spot

== Schedule and results ==
=== Preseason ===
The Blackhawks preseason schedule was released on July 2, 2024.

2024 preseason game log: 1–4–1 (Home: 1–2–0; Road: 0–2–1)

| # | Date | Visitor | Score | Home | OT | Decision | Arena | Attendance | Record | Recap |
|---|---|---|---|---|---|---|---|---|---|---|
| 1 | September 25 | Detroit | 4–2 | Chicago | | Weeks | United Center | 10,354 | 0–1–0 | Recap |
| 2 | September 27 | Chicago | 0–2 | Detroit | | Soderblom | Little Caesars Arena | 11,175 | 0–2–0 | Recap |
| 3 | September 28 | Chicago | 2–3 | St. Louis | OT | Mrazek | Enterprise Center | 18,096 | 0–2–1 | Recap |
| 4 | October 1 | Chicago | 2–7 | Minnesota | | Commesso | Xcel Energy Center | 16,873 | 0–3–1 | Recap |
| 5 | October 4 | Minnesota | 6–1 | Chicago | | Mrazek | United Center | 10,292 | 0–4–1 | Recap |
| 6 | October 5 | St. Louis | 2–6 | Chicago | | Soderblom | Fiserv Forum | – | 1–4–1 | Recap |

Legend:

Win Loss Overtime/shootout loss

=== Regular season ===
The Blackhawks regular season schedule was released on July 2, 2024.

2024–25 game log
October: 3–7–1 (Home: 1–3–0; Road: 2–4–1)

| # | Date | Visitor | Score | Home | OT | Decision | Attendance | Record | Points | Recap |
|---|---|---|---|---|---|---|---|---|---|---|
| 1 | October 8 | Chicago | 2–5 | Utah | | Mrazek | 11,131 | 0–1–0 | 0 | |
| 2 | October 11 | Chicago | 1–2 | Winnipeg | OT | Soderblom | 14,564 | 0–1–1 | 1 | |
| 3 | October 12 | Chicago | 5–2 | Edmonton | | Mrazek | 18,347 | 1–1–1 | 3 | |
| 4 | October 15 | Chicago | 1–3 | Calgary | | Mrazek | 16,242 | 1–2–1 | 3 | |
| 5 | October 17 | San Jose | 2–4 | Chicago | | Mrazek | 19,056 | 2–2–1 | 5 | |
| 6 | October 19 | Buffalo | 4–2 | Chicago | | Soderblom | 18,773 | 2–3–1 | 5 | |
| 7 | October 22 | Vancouver | 6–3 | Chicago | | Mrazek | 17,118 | 2–4–1 | 5 | |
| 8 | October 25 | Nashville | 3–2 | Chicago | | Mrazek | 17,787 | 2–5–1 | 5 | |
| 9 | October 26 | Chicago | 2–4 | Dallas | | Mrazek | 18,532 | 2–6–1 | 5 | |
| 10 | October 28 | Chicago | 5–2 | Colorado | | Mrazek | 18,010 | 3–6–1 | 7 | |
| 11 | October 31 | Chicago | 2–3 | San Jose | | Mrazek | 10,315 | 3–7–1 | 7 | |

November: 5–6–1 (Home: 3–2–0; Road: 2–4–1)

| # | Date | Visitor | Score | Home | OT | Decision | Attendance | Record | Points | Recap |
|---|---|---|---|---|---|---|---|---|---|---|
| 12 | November 2 | Chicago | 4–3 | Los Angeles | SO | Mrazek | 17,314 | 4–7–1 | 9 | |
| 13 | November 3 | Chicago | 4–2 | Anaheim | | Soderblom | 16,352 | 5–7–1 | 11 | |
| 14 | November 6 | Detroit | 4–1 | Chicago | | Mrazek | 19,984 | 5–8–1 | 11 | |
| 15 | November 7 | Chicago | 1–3 | Dallas | | Soderblom | 18,532 | 5–9–1 | 11 | |
| 16 | November 10 | Minnesota | 1–2 | Chicago | OT | Mrazek | 19,657 | 6–9–1 | 13 | |
| 17 | November 14 | Chicago | 1–3 | Seattle | | Mrazek | 17,151 | 6–10–1 | 13 | |
| 18 | November 16 | Chicago | 1–4 | Vancouver | | Soderblom | 18,620 | 6–11–1 | 13 | |
| 19 | November 19 | Anaheim | 3–2 | Chicago | | Soderblom | 17,712 | 6–12–1 | 13 | |
| 20 | November 21 | Florida | 1–3 | Chicago | | Mrazek | 19,107 | 7–12–1 | 15 | |
| 21 | November 23 | Chicago | 2–3 | Philadelphia | OT | Mrazek | 18,714 | 7–12–2 | 16 | |
| 22 | November 27 | Dallas | 2–6 | Chicago | | Mrazek | 19,144 | 8–12–2 | 18 | |
| 23 | November 29 | Chicago | 2–3 | Minnesota | | Mrazek | 18,532 | 8–13–2 | 18 | |

December: 4–11–0 (Home: 3–5–0; Road: 1–6–0)

| # | Date | Visitor | Score | Home | OT | Decision | Attendance | Record | Points | Recap |
|---|---|---|---|---|---|---|---|---|---|---|
| 24 | December 1 | Columbus | 6–3 | Chicago | | Mrazek | 17,393 | 8–14–2 | 18 | |
| 25 | December 2 | Chicago | 1–4 | Toronto | | Soderblom | 18,557 | 8–15–2 | 18 | |
| 26 | December 4 | Boston | 4–2 | Chicago | | Mrazek | 19,179 | 8–16–2 | 18 | |
| 27 | December 7 | Winnipeg | 4–2 | Chicago | | Soderblom | 18,581 | 8–17–2 | 18 | |
| 28 | December 9 | Chicago | 2–1 | NY Rangers | | Soderblom | 18,006 | 9–17–2 | 20 | |
| 29 | December 12 | Chicago | 4–5 | NY Islanders | | Soderblom | 16,170 | 9–18–2 | 20 | |
| 30 | December 14 | Chicago | 1–4 | New Jersey | | Commesso | 16,514 | 9–19–2 | 20 | |
| 31 | December 15 | NY Islanders | 3–5 | Chicago | | Soderblom | 19,264 | 10–19–2 | 22 | |
| 32 | December 17 | Washington | 2–3 | Chicago | | Soderblom | 18,511 | 11–19–2 | 24 | |
| 33 | December 19 | Seattle | 1–3 | Chicago | | Soderblom | 18,991 | 12–19–2 | 26 | |
| 34 | December 21 | Chicago | 4–6 | Calgary | | Mrazek | 18,760 | 12–20–2 | 26 | |
| 35 | December 23 | Chicago | 3–4 | Minnesota | | Soderblom | 19,067 | 12–21–2 | 26 | |
| 36 | December 27 | Chicago | 2–6 | Buffalo | | Mrazek | 19,070 | 12–22–2 | 26 | |
| 37 | December 29 | Dallas | 5–1 | Chicago | | Soderblom | 20,627 | 12–23–2 | 26 | |
| 38 | December 31 | St. Louis | 6–2 | Chicago | | Mrazek | 40,933 | 12–24–2 | 26 | |

January: 4–6–3 (Home: 3–4–2; Road: 1–2–1)

| # | Date | Visitor | Score | Home | OT | Decision | Attendance | Record | Points | Recap |
|---|---|---|---|---|---|---|---|---|---|---|
| 39 | January 3 | Montreal | 2–4 | Chicago | | Soderblom | 19,620 | 13–24–2 | 28 | |
| 40 | January 5 | NY Rangers | 6–2 | Chicago | | Soderblom | 18,819 | 13–25–2 | 28 | |
| 41 | January 8 | Colorado | 1–3 | Chicago | | Mrazek | 17,667 | 14–25–2 | 30 | |
| 42 | January 10 | Chicago | 3–5 | Detroit | | Mrazek | 19,515 | 14–26–2 | 30 | |
| 43 | January 11 | Edmonton | 4–3 | Chicago | | Soderblom | 19,387 | 14–27–2 | 30 | |
| 44 | January 13 | Calgary | 5–2 | Chicago | | Mrazek | 15,966 | 14–28–2 | 30 | |
| 45 | January 16 | Chicago | 2–3 | Nashville | SO | Soderblom | 17,159 | 14–28–3 | 31 | |
| 46 | January 18 | Vegas | 3–5 | Chicago | | Mrazek | 19,340 | 15–28–3 | 33 | |
| 47 | January 20 | Carolina | 4–3 | Chicago | OT | Mrazek | 15,831 | 15–28–4 | 34 | |
| 48 | January 24 | Tampa Bay | 4–3 | Chicago | OT | Soderblom | 18,975 | 15–28–5 | 35 | |
| 49 | January 26 | Minnesota | 4–2 | Chicago | | Mrazek | 18,701 | 15–29–5 | 35 | |
| 50 | January 28 | Chicago | 4–1 | Tampa Bay | | Soderblom | 19,092 | 16–29–5 | 37 | |
| 51 | January 30 | Chicago | 2–3 | Carolina | | Soderblom | 18,896 | 16–30–5 | 37 | |

February: 1–5–2 (Home: 1–1–1; Road: 0–4–1)

| # | Date | Visitor | Score | Home | OT | Decision | Attendance | Record | Points | Recap |
|---|---|---|---|---|---|---|---|---|---|---|
| 52 | February 1 | Chicago | 1–5 | Florida | | Mrazek | 19,457 | 16–31–5 | 37 | |
| 53 | February 5 | Edmonton | 4–3 | Chicago | OT | Soderblom | 17,103 | 16–31–6 | 38 | |
| 54 | February 7 | Nashville | 2–6 | Chicago | | Mrazek | 19,347 | 17–31–6 | 40 | |
| 55 | February 8 | Chicago | 5–6 | St. Louis | SO | Soderblom | 18,096 | 17–31–7 | 41 | |
| 56 | February 22 | Chicago | 1–5 | Columbus | | Mrazek | 18,809 | 17–32–7 | 41 | |
| 57 | February 23 | Toronto | 5–2 | Chicago | | Soderblom | 19,199 | 17–33–7 | 41 | |
| 58 | February 25 | Chicago | 1–2 | Utah | | Soderblom | 11,131 | 17–34–7 | 41 | |
| 59 | February 27 | Chicago | 5–7 | Vegas | | Soderblom | 18,290 | 17–35–7 | 41 | |

March: 4–9–2 (Home: 3–5–1; Road: 1–4–1)

| # | Date | Visitor | Score | Home | OT | Decision | Attendance | Record | Points | Recap |
|---|---|---|---|---|---|---|---|---|---|---|
| 60 | March 1 | Chicago | 6–3 | Anaheim | | Soderblom | 17,174 | 18–35–7 | 43 | |
| 61 | March 3 | Los Angeles | 1–5 | Chicago | | Knight | 16,254 | 19–35–7 | 45 | |
| 62 | March 5 | Ottawa | 4–3 | Chicago | OT | Soderblom | 17,432 | 19–35–8 | 46 | |
| 63 | March 7 | Utah | 3–4 | Chicago | OT | Knight | 19,414 | 20–35–8 | 48 | |
| 64 | March 8 | Chicago | 2–3 | Nashville | OT | Soderblom | 17,159 | 20–35–9 | 49 | |
| 65 | March 10 | Chicago | 0–3 | Colorado | | Knight | 18,072 | 20–36–9 | 49 | |
| 66 | March 13 | Chicago | 2–4 | San Jose | | Knight | 13,546 | 20–37–9 | 49 | |
| 67 | March 15 | Chicago | 2–6 | Vancouver | | Soderblom | 18,847 | 20–38–9 | 49 | |
| 68 | March 18 | Seattle | 6–2 | Chicago | | Knight | 18,505 | 20–39–9 | 49 | |
| 69 | March 20 | Los Angeles | 3–1 | Chicago | | Knight | 16,981 | 20–40–9 | 49 | |
| 70 | March 22 | Chicago | 1–4 | St. Louis | | Soderblom | 18,096 | 20–41–9 | 49 | |
| 71 | March 23 | Philadelphia | 4–7 | Chicago | | Knight | 20,125 | 21–41–9 | 51 | |
| 72 | March 26 | New Jersey | 5–3 | Chicago | | Knight | 17,813 | 21–42–9 | 51 | |
| 73 | March 28 | Vegas | 5–3 | Chicago | | Knight | 19,121 | 21–43–9 | 51 | |
| 74 | March 30 | Utah | 5–2 | Chicago | | Soderblom | 19,153 | 21–44–9 | 51 | |

April: 4–2–2 (Home: 1–0–2; Road: 3–2–0)

| # | Date | Visitor | Score | Home | OT | Decision | Attendance | Record | Points | Recap |
|---|---|---|---|---|---|---|---|---|---|---|
| 75 | April 2 | Colorado | 3–2 | Chicago | SO | Knight | 16,649 | 21–44–10 | 52 | |
| 76 | April 4 | Chicago | 3–5 | Washington | | Knight | 18,573 | 21–45–10 | 52 | |
| 77 | April 6 | Pittsburgh | 1–3 | Chicago | | Knight | 20,487 | 22–45–10 | 54 | |
| 78 | April 8 | Chicago | 0–5 | Pittsburgh | | Knight | 15,029 | 22–46–10 | 54 | |
| 79 | April 10 | Chicago | 5–2 | Boston | | Soderblom | 17,850 | 23–46–10 | 56 | |
| 80 | April 12 | Winnipeg | 5–4 | Chicago | SO | Knight | 20,634 | 23–46–11 | 57 | |
| 81 | April 14 | Chicago | 4–3 | Montreal | SO | Soderblom | 21,105 | 24–46–11 | 59 | |
| 82 | April 15 | Chicago | 4–3 | Ottawa | OT | Knight | 14,115 | 25–46–11 | 61 | |

Legend: Win (2 points) Loss (0 points) Overtime/shootout loss (1 point)

== Awards and honours ==
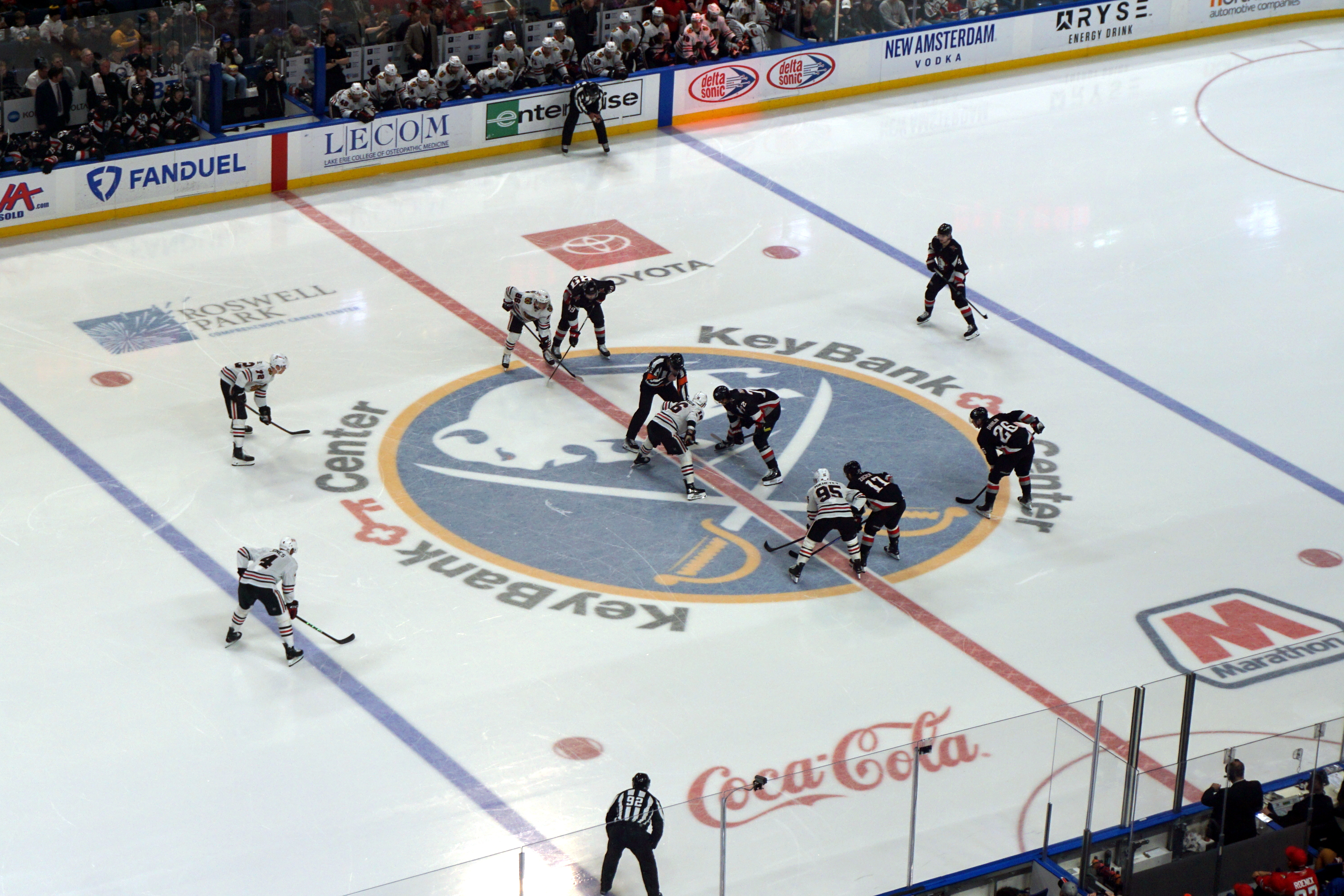
The Blackhawks playing at Buffalo on December 27, 2024

=== Awards ===
Regular season
| Player | Award | Awarded |

=== Milestones ===
Regular season
| Player | Milestone | Reached |
|---|---|---|
| Nolan Allan | 1st NHL game | October 8, 2024 |
| Seth Jones | 800th NHL game | October 12, 2024 |
| Alex Vlasic | 100th NHL game | October 12, 2024 |
| Lukas Reichel | 100th NHL game | October 17, 2024 |
| Taylor Hall | 700th NHL point | October 22, 2024 |
| Nolan Allan | 1st NHL point 1st NHL assist | October 25, 2024 |
| Petr Mrazek | 400th NHL game | November 2, 2024 |
| Taylor Hall | 5th NHL Hat-trick | November 27, 2024 |
| Louis Crevier | 1st NHL goal | November 27, 2024 |
| Patrick Maroon | 800th NHL game | November 29, 2024 |
| Connor Murphy | 700th NHL game | November 29, 2024 |
| Drew Commesso | 1st NHL game | December 12, 2024 |
| Teuvo Teravainen | 700th NHL game | December 14, 2024 |
| Connor Bedard | 100th NHL game | December 17, 2024 |
| Ilya Mikheyev | 300th NHL game | December 17, 2024 |
| Nolan Allan | 1st NHL goal | December 19, 2024 |
| Frank Nazar | 1st NHL assist | December 23, 2024 |
| Colton Dach | 1st NHL game | January 3, 2025 |
| Wyatt Kaiser | 1st NHL goal | January 5, 2025 |
| Colton Dach | 1st NHL point 1st NHL assist | January 8, 2025 |
| Connor Bedard | 100th NHL point | January 13, 2025 |
| Ryan Donato | 100th NHL assist | January 18, 2025 |
| Nick Foligno | 1200th NHL game | January 18, 2025 |
| Colton Dach | 1st NHL goal | January 24, 2025 |
| Ethan Del Mastro | 1st NHL point 1st NHL assist | January 26, 2025 |
| Philipp Kurashev | 300th NHL game | January 26, 2025 |
| Ryan Donato | 200th NHL point | February 7, 2025 |
| Teuvo Teravainen | 500th NHL point | February 23, 2025 |
| Ethan Del Mastro | 1st NHL goal | February 27, 2025 |
| T. J. Brodie | 300th NHL assist | March 1, 2025 |
| Alec Martinez | 200th NHL assist | March 1, 2025 |
| Ryan Donato | 100th NHL goal | March 5, 2025 |
| Artyom Levshunov | 1st NHL game | March 10, 2025 |
| Artyom Levshunov | 1st NHL point 1st NHL assist | March 15, 2025 |
| Jason Dickinson | 500th NHL game | March 18, 2025 |
| Tyler Bertuzzi | 300th NHL point | March 23, 2025 |
| Ryan Donato | 1st NHL Hat-trick | March 28, 2025 |
| Oliver Moore | 1st NHL game | March 30, 2025 |
| Sam Rinzel | 1st NHL game | March 30, 2025 |
| Oliver Moore | 1st NHL point 1st NHL assist | April 4, 2025 |
| Sam Rinzel | 1st NHL point 1st NHL assist | April 6, 2025 |
| Ryan Greene | 1st NHL game | April 14, 2025 |

=== Records ===
Regular season
| Player | Record | Reached |
|---|---|---|
| Landon Slaggert | Fastest goal to start a game in franchise history (7 seconds) | February 1, 2025 |
| Frank Nazar | First rookie to score a penalty shot goal in franchise history | March 7, 2025 |
| Connor Bedard | Most assists by a teenager in franchise history (83) | April 12, 2025 |

== Transactions ==
The Blackhawks have been involved in the following transactions during the 2024–25 season.

=== Key ===
† Contract is entry-level.
‡ Contract initially takes effect in the 2025–26 season.

=== Trades ===
| Date | Details | | Ref |
|---|---|---|---|
| June 28, 2024 | To Carolina Hurricanes 2nd-round pick in 2024 (#34 overall); NYI 2nd-round pick in 2024 (#50 overall) | To Chicago Blackhawks 1st-round pick in 2024 (#27 overall) | |
| June 29, 2024 | To Carolina Hurricanes 3rd-round pick in 2025 | To Chicago Blackhawks 3rd-round pick in 2024 (#92 overall) | |
| January 15, 2025 | To Winnipeg Jets Isaak Phillips | To Chicago Blackhawks Dmitri Kuzmin | |
| January 24, 2025 | To Colorado Avalanche Nils Juntorp | To Carolina Hurricanes Mikko Rantanen | |
| January 24, 2025 | To Carolina Hurricanes Taylor Hall | To Chicago Blackhawks 3rd-round pick in 2025 | |
| March 1, 2025 | To Florida Panthers Seth Jones | To Chicago Blackhawks Spencer Knight; 1st-round pick in 2026 | |
| March 7, 2025 | To Detroit Red Wings Petr Mrazek; Craig Smith | To Chicago Blackhawks Joseph Veleno | |
| March 7, 2025 | To Utah Hockey Club 5th-round pick in 2026 | To Chicago Blackhawks Shea Weber; Aku Raty; Victor Soderstrom | |

=== Players acquired ===
| Date | Player | Former team | Term | Via | Ref |
|---|---|---|---|---|---|
| July 1, 2024 | Tyler Bertuzzi | Toronto Maple Leafs | 4-year | Free agency | |
| July 1, 2024 | T. J. Brodie | Toronto Maple Leafs | 2-year | Free agency | |
| July 1, 2024 | Laurent Brossoit | Winnipeg Jets | 2-year | Free agency | |
| July 1, 2024 | Patrick Maroon | Boston Bruins | 2-year | Free agency | |
| July 1, 2024 | Alec Martinez | Vegas Golden Knights | 1-year | Free agency | |
| July 1, 2024 | Craig Smith | Dallas Stars | 2-year | Free agency | |
| July 1, 2024 | Teuvo Teravainen | Carolina Hurricanes | 3-year | Free agency | |

=== Players lost ===
| Date | Player | New team | Term | Via | Ref |
|---|---|---|---|---|---|
| July 1, 2024 | Mike Hardman | New Jersey Devils | 2-year | Free agency | |
| July 1, 2024 | Reese Johnson | Minnesota Wild | 1-year | Free agency | |
| July 1, 2024 | Taylor Raddysh | Washington Capitals | 1-year | Free agency | |
| July 2, 2024 | Colin Blackwell | Dallas Stars | 1-year | Free agency | |
| July 2, 2024 | MacKenzie Entwistle | Florida Panthers | 1-year | Free agency | |
| July 2, 2024 | Luke Philp | Washington Capitals | 1-year | Free agency | |
| July 2, 2024 | Filip Roos | Ottawa Senators | 1-year | Free agency | |
| July 5, 2024 | Jaycob Megna | Florida Panthers | 1-year | Free agency | |
| July 5, 2024 | Jaxson Stauber | Utah Hockey Club | 1-year | Free agency | |
| September 10, 2024 | Jarred Tinordi | Calgary Flames | 1-year | Free agency | |
| November 4, 2024 | Tyler Johnson | Boston Bruins | 1-year | Free agency | |

=== Signings ===
| Date | Player | Term | Ref |
|---|---|---|---|
| July 1, 2024 | Joey Anderson | 2-year | |
| July 6, 2024 | Artyom Levshunov | 3-year† | |

== Draft picks ==
Below are the Chicago Blackhawks's selections at the 2024 NHL entry draft, which was held on June 28 and 29, 2024, at the Sphere in Las Vegas, Nevada.

| Round | # | Player | Pos | Nationality | College/Junior/Club team (League) |
|---|---|---|---|---|---|
| 1 | 2 | Artyom Levshunov | D | Belarus | Michigan State Spartans (Big Ten) |
| 1 | 18 (Note: The New York Islanders' first-round pick went to the Chicago Blackhawks as the result of a trade on May 24, 2024, that sent Tampa Bay's first-round pick and Los Angeles and Vancouver's second-round picks in 2024 to the Islanders in exchange for a second-round pick in 2024 and this pick.) | Sacha Boisvert | C | Canada | Muskegon Lumberjacks (USHL) |
| 1 | 27 (Note: The Carolina Hurricanes' first-round pick went to the Blackhawks as the result of a trade on June 28, 2024, that sent a second-round pick in 2024 (34th overall) and the Islanders' second-round pick in 2024 (50th overall) to Carolina in exchange for this pick.) | Marek Vanacker | LW | Canada | Brantford Bulldogs (OHL) |
| 3 | 67 | John Mustard | LW | Canada | Waterloo Black Hawks (USHL) |
| 3 | 72 (Note: The Ottawa Senators' third-round pick went to the Blackhawks as the result of a trade on July 7, 2022, that sent Alex DeBrincat to Ottawa in exchange for a first and second-round pick in 2022 and this pick.) | A.J. Spellacy | RW | Canada | Windsor Spitfires (OHL) |
| 3 | 93 (Note: Carolina's third-round pick went to the Blackhawks as the result of a trade on June 29, 2024, that sent a third-round pick in 2025 to Carolina in exchange for this pick.) | Jack Pridham | RW | Canada | West Kelowna Warriors (BCHL) |
| 5 | 138 (Note: The Calgary Flames' fifth-round pick went to the Blackhawks as the result of a trade on March 21, 2022, that sent Ryan Carpenter to Calgary in exchange for this pick.) | Joel Svensson | C | Sweden | Växjö Lakers (J20 Nationell) |
| 6 | 163 | Ty Henry | D | Canada | Erie Otters (OHL) |
