= 2024–25 Pittsburgh Penguins season =

National Hockey League season

2024–25 Pittsburgh Penguins
- Division: 7th Metropolitan
- Conference: 13th Eastern
- 2024–25 record: 34–36–12
- Home record: 21–15–5
- Road record: 13–21–7
- Goals for: 243
- Goals against: 293

Team information
- General manager: Kyle Dubas
- Coach: Mike Sullivan
- Captain: Sidney Crosby
- Alternate captains: Kris Letang; Evgeni Malkin
- Arena: PPG Paints Arena
- Average attendance: 16,635
- Minor league affiliates: Wilkes-Barre/Scranton Penguins (AHL); Wheeling Nailers (ECHL)

Team leaders
- Goals: Rickard Rakell (35)
- Assists: Sidney Crosby (58)
- Points: Sidney Crosby (91)
- Penalty minutes: Kris Letang (52)
- Plus/minus: Conor Timmins (+9)
- Wins: Tristan Jarry (16)
- Goals against average: Tristan Jarry; Alex Nedeljkovic (3.12)

The 2024–25 Pittsburgh Penguins season was the 58th season (57th season of play) for the National Hockey League (NHL) franchise that was established on June 5, 1967.

On April 6, 2025, the Penguins were eliminated from playoff contention for the third consecutive season for the first time since the 2002–03 season and the 2005–06 season following a loss to the Chicago Blackhawks. This was the Penguins first season finishing with a losing record since the 2005–06 season. Their .488 points percentage was also their worst since that season.

The 2024–25 season also saw the deaths of two beloved former members of the Penguins organization, longtime Hall of Fame broadcaster Mike Lange on February 19, 2025, and former general manager Ray Shero nearly two months later on April 9.

== Off-season ==
=== June ===
On June 11, 2024, David Quinn was named assistant coach of the Pittsburgh Penguins, coaching alongside longtime friend and former Boston University teammate Mike Sullivan. Quinn was most recently the head coach of the San Jose Sharks from 2022–24.

== Standings ==
=== Divisional standings ===
Metropolitan Division
Pos	Team	GP	W	L	OTL	RW	GF	GA	GD	Pts
1	z – Washington Capitals	82	51	22	9	43	288	232	+56	111
2	x – Carolina Hurricanes	82	47	30	5	42	266	233	+33	99
3	x – New Jersey Devils	82	42	33	7	36	242	222	+20	91
4	Columbus Blue Jackets	82	40	33	9	30	273	268	+5	89
5	New York Rangers	82	39	36	7	35	256	255	+1	85
6	New York Islanders	82	35	35	12	28	224	260	−36	82
7	Pittsburgh Penguins	82	34	36	12	24	243	293	−50	80
8	Philadelphia Flyers	82	33	39	10	21	238	286	−48	76

Source: National Hockey League
Rules for classification: 1) Fewer number of games played (GP, only during regular season); 2) Greater number of regulation wins (RW); 3) Greater number of wins in regulation and overtime, excluding shootout wins (ROW); 4) Greater number of total wins, including shootouts (W); 5) Greater number of points earned in head-to-head play; if teams played an uneven number of head-to-head games, the result of the first game on the home ice of the team with the extra home game is discarded; 6) Greater goal differential (GD); 7) Greater number of goals scored (GF)
x – Clinched playoff spot; z – Clinched conference

=== Conference standings ===
Eastern Conference Wild Card
Pos	Div	Team	GP	W	L	OTL	RW	GF	GA	GD	Pts
1	AT	x – Ottawa Senators	82	45	30	7	35	243	234	+9	97
2	AT	x – Montreal Canadiens	82	40	31	11	30	245	265	−20	91
3	ME	Columbus Blue Jackets	82	40	33	9	30	273	268	+5	89
4	AT	Detroit Red Wings	82	39	35	8	30	238	259	−21	86
5	ME	New York Rangers	82	39	36	7	35	256	255	+1	85
6	ME	New York Islanders	82	35	35	12	28	224	260	−36	82
7	ME	Pittsburgh Penguins	82	34	36	12	24	243	293	−50	80
8	AT	Buffalo Sabres	82	36	39	7	29	269	289	−20	79
9	AT	Boston Bruins	82	33	39	10	26	222	272	−50	76
10	ME	Philadelphia Flyers	82	33	39	10	21	238	286	−48	76

Source: National Hockey League
Rules for classification: 1) Fewer number of games played (GP, only during regular season); 2) Greater number of regulation wins (RW); 3) Greater number of wins in regulation and overtime, excluding shootout wins (ROW); 4) Greater number of total wins, including shootouts (W); 5) Greater number of points earned in head-to-head play; if teams played an uneven number of head-to-head games, the result of the first game on the home ice of the team with the extra home game is discarded; 6) Greater goal differential (GD); 7) Greater number of goals scored (GF)
x – Clinched playoff spot

== Schedule and results ==
=== Preseason ===
The Preseason schedule was released on June 24, 2024.

2024 preseason game log
September/October: 4–3–0 (Home: 1–2–0; Road: 3–1–0)

#	Date	Visitor	Score	Home	OT	Location	Attendance	Record
1	September 21	Pittsburgh	3–7	Buffalo		KeyBank Center	12,013	0–1–0
2	September 24	Buffalo	3–2	Pittsburgh		PPG Paints Arena	11,588	0–2–0
—	September 28	Pittsburgh	–	Detroit	Game postponed due to mechanical issues with the Penguins team plane. Rescheduled for September 30			
3^{A}	September 29	Pittsburgh	5–2	Ottawa		Sudbury Community Arena	4,640	1–2–0
4	September 30	Pittsburgh	5–1	Detroit		Little Caesars Arena	5,775	2–2–0
5	October 1	Detroit	2–1	Pittsburgh		PPG Paints Arena	12,059	2–3–0
6	October 3	Pittsburgh	3–1	Columbus		Nationwide Arena	12,649	3–3–0
7	October 4	Columbus	3–7	Pittsburgh		PPG Paints Arena	14,573	4–3–0

Legend

Win Loss OT/SO Loss ^{A} Game played in Sudbury, Ontario.

=== Regular season ===
The regular season schedule was released on July 2, 2024.

2024–25 game log
October: 4–7–1 (Home: 2–3–0; Road: 2–4–1)

#	Date	Visitor	Score	Home	OT	Arena	Decision	Attendance	Record	Points	Recap
1	October 9	NY Rangers	6–0	Pittsburgh		PPG Paints Arena	Jarry	18,190	0–1–0	0	
2	October 10	Pittsburgh	6–3	Detroit		Little Caesars Arena	Blomqvist	17,916	1–1–0	2	
3	October 12	Pittsburgh	2–4	Toronto		Scotiabank Arena	Blomqvist	18,934	1–2–0	2	
4	October 14	Pittsburgh	6–3	Montreal		Bell Centre	Jarry	21,105	2–2–0	4	
5	October 16	Buffalo	5–6	Pittsburgh	OT	PPG Paints Arena	Blomqvist	15,644	3–2–0	6	
6	October 18	Carolina	4–1	Pittsburgh		PPG Paints Arena	Blomqvist	17,074	3–3–0	6	
7	October 20	Pittsburgh	3–6	Winnipeg		Canada Life Centre	Nedeljkovic	13,760	3–4–0	6	
8	October 22	Pittsburgh	3–4	Calgary	SO	Scotiabank Saddledome	Nedeljkovic	17,025	3–4–1	7	
9	October 25	Pittsburgh	0–4	Edmonton		Rogers Place	Blomqvist	18,347	3–5–1	7	
10	October 26	Pittsburgh	3–4	Vancouver		Rogers Arena	Nedeljkovic	18,748	3–6–1	7	
11	October 29	Minnesota	5–3	Pittsburgh		PPG Paints Arena	Blomqvist	18,195	3–7–1	7	
12	October 31	Anaheim	1–2	Pittsburgh	OT	PPG Paints Arena	Nedeljkovic	14,945	4–7–1	9	

November: 6–5–3 (Home: 4–3–2; Road: 2–2–1)

#	Date	Visitor	Score	Home	OT	Arena	Decision	Attendance	Record	Points	Recap
13	November 2	Montreal	1–3	Pittsburgh		PPG Paints Arena	Nedeljkovic	17,362	5–7–1	11	
14	November 5	Pittsburgh	3–4	NY Islanders	SO	UBS Arena	Nedeljkovic	14,025	5–7–2	12	
15	November 7	Pittsburgh	1–5	Carolina		Lenovo Center	Nedeljkovic	18,700	5–8–2	12	
16	November 8	Pittsburgh	4–2	Washington		Capital One Arena	Blomqvist	18,573	6–8–2	14	
17	November 11	Dallas	7–1	Pittsburgh		PPG Paints Arena	Blomqvist	16,526	6–9–2	14	
18	November 13	Detroit	3–2	Pittsburgh	OT	PPG Paints Arena	Nedeljkovic	15,191	6–9–3	15	
19	November 15	Pittsburgh	2–6	Columbus		Nationwide Arena	Jarry	18,348	6–10–3	15	
20	November 16	San Jose	3–4	Pittsburgh	SO	PPG Paints Arena	Nedeljkovic	18,194	7–10–3	17	
21	November 19	Tampa Bay	3–2	Pittsburgh	OT	PPG Paints Arena	Jarry	16,065	7–10–4	18	
22	November 22	Winnipeg	4–1	Pittsburgh		PPG Paints Arena	Jarry	15,232	7–11–4	18	
23	November 23	Utah	6–1	Pittsburgh		PPG Paints Arena	Nedeljkovic	16,324	7–12–4	18	
24	November 27	Vancouver	4–5	Pittsburgh		PPG Paints Arena	Jarry	16,016	8–12–4	20	
25	November 29	Pittsburgh	2–1	Boston		TD Garden	Jarry	17,850	9–12–4	22	
26	November 30	Calgary	2–6	Pittsburgh		PPG Paints Arena	Nedeljkovic	16,060	10–12–4	24	

December: 7–5–1 (Home: 5–1–0; Road: 2–4–1)

#	Date	Visitor	Score	Home	OT	Arena	Decision	Attendance	Record	Points	Recap
27	December 3	Florida	4–5	Pittsburgh	OT	PPG Paints Arena	Jarry	15,502	11–12–4	26	
28	December 6	Pittsburgh	2–4	NY Rangers		Madison Square Garden	Nedeljkovic	18,006	11–13–4	26	
29	December 7	Toronto	2–5	Pittsburgh		PPG Paints Arena	Jarry	17,290	12–13–4	28	
30	December 10	Colorado	6–2	Pittsburgh		PPG Paints Arena	Jarry	15,632	12–14–4	28	
31	December 12	Pittsburgh	9–2	Montreal		Bell Centre	Jarry	21,105	13–14–4	30	
32	December 14	Pittsburgh	2–3	Ottawa	OT	Canadian Tire Centre	Jarry	18,892	13–14–5	31	
33	December 17	Los Angeles	2–3	Pittsburgh	OT	PPG Paints Arena	Nedeljkovic	15,011	14–14–5	33	
34	December 19	Pittsburgh	5–4	Nashville	OT	Bridgestone Arena	Jarry	17,159	15–14–5	35	
35	December 21	Pittsburgh	0–3	New Jersey		Prudential Center	Jarry	16,514	15–15–5	35	
36	December 23	Philadelphia	3–7	Pittsburgh		PPG Paints Arena	Jarry	18,290	16–15–5	37	
37	December 28	Pittsburgh	3–6	NY Islanders		UBS Arena	Jarry	17,255	16–16–5	37	
38	December 29	NY Islanders	2–3	Pittsburgh		PPG Paints Arena	Nedeljkovic	18,357	17–16–5	39	
39	December 31	Pittsburgh	2–4	Detroit		Little Caesars Arena	Nedeljkovic	19,515	17–17–5	39	

January: 4–7–3 (Home: 1–3–1; Road: 3–4–2)

#	Date	Visitor	Score	Home	OT	Arena	Decision	Attendance	Record	Points	Recap
40	January 3	Pittsburgh	2–3	Florida	SO	Amerant Bank Arena	Jarry	19,543	17–17–6	40	
41	January 5	Pittsburgh	3–4	Carolina	OT	Lenovo Center	Nedeljkovic	18,891	17–17–7	41	
42	January 7	Columbus	4–3	Pittsburgh	SO	PPG Paints Arena	Jarry	16,060	17–17–8	42	
43	January 9	Edmonton	3–5	Pittsburgh		PPG Paints Arena	Nedeljkovic	17,004	18–17–8	44	
44	January 11	Ottawa	5–0	Pittsburgh		PPG Paints Arena	Nedeljkovic	18,043	18–18–8	44	
45	January 12	Tampa Bay	5–2	Pittsburgh		PPG Paints Arena	Jarry	17,352	18–19–8	44	
46	January 14	Seattle	4–2	Pittsburgh		PPG Paints Arena	Jarry	16,314	18–20–8	44	
47	January 17	Pittsburgh	5–2	Buffalo		KeyBank Center	Nedeljkovic	19,070	19–20–8	46	
48	January 18	Pittsburgh	1–4	Washington		Capital One Arena	Blomqvist	18,573	19–21–8	46	
49	January 20	Pittsburgh	5–1	Los Angeles		Crypto.com Arena	Nedeljkovic	18,145	20–21–8	48	
50	January 23	Pittsburgh	1–5	Anaheim		Honda Center	Nedeljkovic	15,330	20–22–8	48	
51	January 25	Pittsburgh	1–4	Seattle		Climate Pledge Arena	Blomqvist	17,151	20–23–8	48	
52	January 27	Pittsburgh	1–2	San Jose		SAP Center	Nedeljkovic	11,625	20–24–8	48	
53	January 29	Pittsburgh	3–2	Utah	OT	Delta Center	Nedeljkovic	11,131	21–24–8	50	

February: 3–4–1 (Home: 2–2–1; Road: 1–2–0)

#	Date	Visitor	Score	Home	OT	Arena	Decision	Attendance	Record	Points	Recap
54	February 1	Nashville	0–3	Pittsburgh		PPG Paints Arena	Nedeljkovic	18,272	22–24–8	52	
55	February 4	New Jersey	3–2	Pittsburgh	SO	PPG Paints Arena	Nedeljkovic	15,916	22–24–9	53	
56	February 7	Pittsburgh	3–2	NY Rangers		Madison Square Garden	Nedeljkovic	18,006	23–24–9	55	
57	February 8	Pittsburgh	2–3	Philadelphia		Wells Fargo Center	Blomqvist	19,280	23–25–9	55	
58	February 22	Washington	8–3	Pittsburgh		PPG Paints Arena	Nedeljkovic	18,207	23–26–9	55	
59	February 23	NY Rangers	5–3	Pittsburgh		PPG Paints Arena	Blomqvist	17,186	23–27–9	55	
60	February 25	Pittsburgh	1–6	Philadelphia		Wells Fargo Center	Nedeljkovic	19,089	23–28–9	55	
61	February 27	Philadelphia	4–5	Pittsburgh	OT	PPG Paints Arena	Blomqvist	16,630	24–28–9	57	

March: 6–6–2 (Home: 5–2–1; Road: 1–4–1)

#	Date	Visitor	Score	Home	OT	Arena	Decision	Attendance	Record	Points	Recap
62	March 1	Boston	3–2	Pittsburgh		PPG Paints Arena	Nedeljkovic	17,320	24–29–9	57	
63	March 2	Toronto	6–5	Pittsburgh	OT	PPG Paints Arena	Blomqvist	16,284	24–29–10	58	
64	March 4	Pittsburgh	1–4	Colorado		Ball Arena	Nedeljkovic	18,037	24–30–10	58	
65	March 7	Pittsburgh	0–4	Vegas		T-Mobile Arena	Nedeljkovic	18,219	24–31–10	58	
66	March 9	Pittsburgh	3–1	Minnesota		Xcel Energy Center	Jarry	18,717	25–31–10	60	
67	March 11	Vegas	2–3	Pittsburgh	OT	PPG Paints Arena	Jarry	15,760	26–31–10	62	
68	March 13	St. Louis	3–5	Pittsburgh		PPG Paints Arena	Jarry	15,070	27–31–10	64	
69	March 15	New Jersey	3–7	Pittsburgh		PPG Paints Arena	Jarry	15,442	28–31–10	66	
70	March 18	NY Islanders	4–2	Pittsburgh		PPG Paints Arena	Jarry	17,484	28–32–10	66	
71	March 21	Columbus	3–6	Pittsburgh		PPG Paints Arena	Nedeljkovic	17,222	29–32–10	68	
72	March 23	Pittsburgh	3–4	Florida	SO	Amerant Bank Arena	Jarry	19,525	29–32–11	69	
73	March 25	Pittsburgh	1–6	Tampa Bay		Amalie Arena	Jarry	19,092	29–33–11	69	
74	March 27	Pittsburgh	3–7	Buffalo		KeyBank Center	Jarry	16,418	29–34–11	69	
75	March 30	Ottawa	0–1	Pittsburgh	OT	PPG Paints Arena	Jarry	16,016	30–34–11	71	

April: 4–2–1 (Home: 2–1–0; Road: 2–1–1)

#	Date	Visitor	Score	Home	OT	Arena	Decision	Attendance	Record	Points	Recap
76	April 3	Pittsburgh	4–5	St. Louis	OT	Enterprise Center	Jarry	18,096	30–34–12	72	
77	April 5	Pittsburgh	5–3	Dallas		American Airlines Center	Jarry	18,532	31–34–12	74	
78	April 6	Pittsburgh	1–3	Chicago		United Center	Nedeljkovic	20,487	31–35–12	74	
79	April 8	Chicago	0–5	Pittsburgh		PPG Paints Arena	Jarry	15,029	32–35–12	76	
80	April 11	Pittsburgh	4–2	New Jersey		Prudential Center	Jarry	16,514	33–35–12	78	
81	April 13	Boston	4–1	Pittsburgh		PPG Paints Arena	Jarry	15,976	33–36–12	78	
82	April 17	Washington	2–5	Pittsburgh		PPG Paints Arena	Nedeljkovic	18,348	34–36–12	80	

Legend: Win (2 points) Loss (0 points) Overtime/shootout loss (1 point)

== Player statistics ==
As of end of 2025 Regular Season

Skaters

Regular season
Player	GP	G	A	Pts	+/−	PIM
Sidney Crosby	80	33	58	91	-20	31
Rickard Rakell	81	35	35	70	-22	14
Bryan Rust	71	31	34	65	-21	18
Erik Karlsson	82	11	42	53	-24	20
Evgeni Malkin	68	16	34	50	-24	42
Matt Grzelcyk	82	1	39	40	-6	16
Kris Letang	74	9	21	30	-15	52
Michael Bunting^{‡}	58	14	15	29	-18	48
Kevin Hayes	64	13	10	23	-15	8
Philip Tomasino^{†}	50	11	12	23	-10	8
Anthony Beauvillier^{‡}	63	13	7	20	-1	14
Blake Lizotte	59	11	9	20	-4	26
Marcus Pettersson^{‡}	47	3	15	18	-2	25
Drew O'Connor^{‡}	53	6	10	16	-14	16
Cody Glass ^{‡}	51	4	11	15	-9	12
Noel Acciari	79	5	7	12	-25	16
Danton Heinen^{†}	28	3	8	11	3	0
Jesse Puljujarvi ^{‡}	26	3	6	9	-1	10
Lars Eller^{‡}	17	4	3	7	-4	10
Connor Dewar^{†}	17	4	3	7	0	9
Conor Timmins^{†}	17	1	6	7	9	6
Ville Koivunen	8	0	7	7	0	4
Ryan Shea	39	2	3	5	-9	14
Ryan Graves	61	1	3	4	-15	29
Valtteri Puustinen	13	2	1	3	-4	4
Matt Nieto	32	1	2	3	-8	4
Rutger McGroarty	8	1	2	3	0	0
Owen Pickering	25	1	2	3	-5	6
Vladislav Kolyachonok^{†}	12	0	2	2	-5	8
Bokondji Imama	16	1	0	1	2	30
Joona Koppanen	11	1	0	1	-3	0
Pierre-Olivier Joseph^{†}	24	0	1	1	-15	22
Emil Bemstrom	14	0	1	1	0	0
Jack St. Ivany	19	0	1	1	-3	17
Sam Poulin	7	0	1	1	1	2
Thomas Novak^{†}	2	0	0	0	-2	0
Vincent Desharnais^{†‡}	10	0	0	0	-4	4
Nathan Clurman	1	0	0	0	0	2
Vasily Ponomarev	7	0	0	0	-1	2

Goaltenders

Regular season
Player	GP	GS	TOI	W	L	OT	GA	GAA	SA	SV%	SO	G	A	PIM
Tristan Jarry	36	35	2,019:54	16	12	6	105	3.12	971	.893	2	0	1	2
Alex Nedeljkovic	38	35	2,150:51	14	15	5	112	3.12	1,054	.894	1	1	2	2
Joel Blomqvist	15	12	772:27	4	9	1	49	3.81	425	.885	0	0	0	0

^{†}Denotes player spent time with another team before joining the Penguins. Stats reflect time with the Penguins only.
^{‡}Denotes player was traded mid-season. Stats reflect time with the Penguins only.

== Suspensions/fines ==
Player	Explanation	Length	Salary	Date issued

== Awards and honours ==
=== Awards ===
Regular season
Player	Award	Awarded

=== Milestones ===
Regular season
Player	Milestone	Reached
S. Crosby	1,600th career NHL point	October 16, 2024
E. Malkin	500th career NHL goal	October 16, 2024

=== Records ===
Regular season
Player	Record	Reached

== Transactions ==
The Penguins have been involved in the following transactions during the 2024–25 season.

Key:

† Contract is entry-level.
‡ Contract initially takes effect in the 2025–26 season.

=== Trades ===
Date	Details		Ref
June 29, 2024	To St. Louis Blues Future considerations	To Pittsburgh Penguins Kevin Hayes; 2nd-round pick in 2025	
June 30, 2024	To Tampa Bay Lightning Lukas Svejkovsky	To Pittsburgh Penguins Bennett MacArthur	
July 1, 2024	To New York Rangers Reilly Smith	To Pittsburgh Penguins 5th-round pick in 2025; 2nd-round pick in 2027	
August 13, 2024	To Nashville Predators Jordan Frasca	To Pittsburgh Penguins Cody Glass; MIN 3rd-round pick in 2025; 6th-round pick in 2026	
August 22, 2024	To Winnipeg Jets Brayden Yager	To Pittsburgh Penguins Rutger McGroarty	
November 12, 2024	To Washington Capitals Lars Eller	To Pittsburgh Penguins CHI 5th-round pick in 2025; 3rd-round pick in 2027	
November 25, 2024	To Nashville Predators NYR 4th-round pick in 2027	To Pittsburgh Penguins Philip Tomasino	
December 18, 2024	To St. Louis Blues Future considerations	To Pittsburgh Penguins Pierre-Olivier Joseph	
January 3, 2025	To Buffalo Sabres Bennett MacArthur	To Pittsburgh Penguins Colton Poolman	
January 31, 2025	To Vancouver Canucks Drew O'Connor; Marcus Pettersson	To Pittsburgh Penguins Vincent Desharnais; Melvin Fernstrom; Danton Heinen conditional NYR 1st-round pick in 2025 or 2026^{1}	
March 5, 2025	To San Jose Sharks Vincent Desharnais	To Pittsburgh Penguins 5th-round pick in 2028	
March 5, 2025	To Nashville Predators Michael Bunting; 4th-round pick in 2026	To Pittsburgh Penguins Tommy Novak; Luke Schenn	
March 7, 2025	To Washington Capitals Anthony Beauvillier	To Pittsburgh Penguins 2nd-round pick in 2025	

Notes

- This pick is top-13 protected. Pittsburgh will get New York's first-round pick in 2025 if it's outside of the top-13.

=== Players acquired ===
Date	Player	Former team	Term	Via	Ref
July 1, 2024	Anthony Beauvillier	Nashville Predators	1-year	Free agency	
July 1, 2024	Matt Grzelcyk	Boston Bruins	1-year	Free agency	
July 1, 2024	Mac Hollowell	Hartford Wolf Pack (AHL)	1-year	Free agency	
July 1, 2024	Jimmy Huntington	Hershey Bears (AHL)	1-year	Free agency	
July 1, 2024	Bokondji Imama	Ottawa Senators	1-year	Free agency	
July 1, 2024	Blake Lizotte	Los Angeles Kings	2-year	Free agency	
July 2, 2024	Sebastian Aho	New York Islanders	2-year	Free agency	

=== Players lost ===
Date	Player	New team	Term	Via	Ref
July 1, 2024	Vinnie Hinostroza	Nashville Predators	2-year	Free agency	
July 1, 2024	Jack Rathbone	Buffalo Sabres	1-year	Free agency	
July 2, 2024	Jansen Harkins	Anaheim Ducks	1-year	Free agency	
July 3, 2024	Pierre-Olivier Joseph	St. Louis Blues	1-year	Free agency	

=== Signings ===
Date	Player	Term	Ref
July 25, 2024	Brayden Yager	3-year†	
July 30, 2024	Sergei Murashov	3-year†	
August 22, 2024	Rutger McGroarty	3-year†	
March 3, 2025	Finn Harding	3-year†	
March 7, 2025	Ryan Shea	1-year	
March 9, 2025	Chase Pietila	3-year†‡	
March 10, 2025	Daniel Laatsch	2-year†‡	
March 13, 2025	Avery Hayes	2-year†‡	

== Draft picks ==
Below are the Pittsburgh Penguins's selections at the 2024 NHL entry draft, which was held on June 28 and 29, 2024, at the Sphere in Paradise, Nevada.

Round	#	Player	Pos	Nationality	College/Junior/Club team (League)
2	44	Harrison Brunicke	D	Canada	Kamloops Blazers (WHL)
2	46	Tanner Howe	LW	Canada	Regina Pats (WHL)
4	111	Chase Pietila	D	United States	Michigan Tech (NCAA)
6	175	Joona Vaisanen	D	Finland	Dubuque Fighting Saints USHL
7	207	Mac Swanson	LW	United States	North Dakota (NCAA)
7	223	Finn Harding	D	Canada	Mississauga Steelheads (OHL)
