= 2024–25 Colorado Avalanche season =

National Hockey League season

2024–25 Colorado Avalanche
- Division: 3rd Central
- Conference: 5th Western
- 2024–25 record: 49–29–4
- Home record: 26–12–3
- Road record: 23–17–1
- Goals for: 277
- Goals against: 234

Team information
- General manager: Chris MacFarland
- Coach: Jared Bednar
- Captain: Gabriel Landeskog
- Alternate captains: Nathan MacKinnon; Mikko Rantanen (Oct. 9 – Jan. 24); Cale Makar; Devon Toews (Jan. 24 – May. 5)
- Arena: Ball Arena
- Average attendance: 18,067
- Minor league affiliates: Colorado Eagles (AHL); Utah Grizzlies (ECHL)

Team leaders
- Goals: Nathan MacKinnon (32)
- Assists: Nathan MacKinnon (84)
- Points: Nathan MacKinnon (116)
- Penalty minutes: Miles Wood (48)
- Plus/minus: Artturi Lehkonen (+36)
- Wins: Mackenzie Blackwood (22)
- Goals against average: Scott Wedgewood (1.99)

The 2024–25 Colorado Avalanche season was the 46th season for the Avalanche as the National Hockey League (NHL) franchise that joined the league in 1979, and their 29th playing season since the franchise relocated from Quebec City prior to the start of the 1995–96 NHL season.

On October 16, 2024, after a 5–3 loss at home against the Boston Bruins, the Avalanche lost their first four games for the first time since 1998–99.

On April 3, 2025, the Avalanche clinched their eighth straight playoff appearance after a 7–3 win over the Columbus Blue Jackets. In the first round, they faced the Dallas Stars, losing in seven games.

== Standings ==
=== Divisional standings ===
Central Division
Pos	Team	GP	W	L	OTL	RW	GF	GA	GD	Pts
1	p – Winnipeg Jets	82	56	22	4	43	277	191	+86	116
2	x – Dallas Stars	82	50	26	6	41	277	224	+53	106
3	x – Colorado Avalanche	82	49	29	4	40	277	234	+43	102
4	x – Minnesota Wild	82	45	30	7	33	228	239	−11	97
5	x – St. Louis Blues	82	44	30	8	32	254	233	+21	96
6	Utah Hockey Club	82	38	31	13	30	241	251	−10	89
7	Nashville Predators	82	30	44	8	24	214	274	−60	68
8	Chicago Blackhawks	82	25	46	11	20	226	296	−70	61

Source: National Hockey League
Rules for classification: 1) Fewer number of games played (GP, only during regular season); 2) Greater number of regulation wins (RW); 3) Greater number of wins in regulation and overtime, excluding shootout wins (ROW); 4) Greater number of total wins, including shootouts (W); 5) Greater number of points earned in head-to-head play; if teams played an uneven number of head-to-head games, the result of the first game on the home ice of the team with the extra home game is discarded; 6) Greater goal differential (GD); 7) Greater number of goals scored (GF)
p – Clinched Presidents' Trophy; x – Clinched playoff spot

=== Conference standings ===
Western Conference Wild Card
Pos	Div	Team	GP	W	L	OTL	RW	GF	GA	GD	Pts
1	CE	x – Minnesota Wild	82	45	30	7	33	228	239	−11	97
2	CE	x – St. Louis Blues	82	44	30	8	32	254	233	+21	96
3	PA	Calgary Flames	82	41	27	14	31	225	238	−13	96
4	PA	Vancouver Canucks	82	38	30	14	28	236	253	−17	90
5	CE	Utah Hockey Club	82	38	31	13	30	241	251	−10	89
6	PA	Anaheim Ducks	82	35	37	10	24	221	263	−42	80
7	PA	Seattle Kraken	82	35	41	6	28	247	265	−18	76
8	CE	Nashville Predators	82	30	44	8	24	214	274	−60	68
9	CE	Chicago Blackhawks	82	25	46	11	20	226	296	−70	61
10	PA	San Jose Sharks	82	20	50	12	14	210	315	−105	52

Source: National Hockey League
Rules for classification: 1) Fewer number of games played (GP, only during regular season); 2) Greater number of regulation wins (RW); 3) Greater number of wins in regulation and overtime, excluding shootout wins (ROW); 4) Greater number of total wins, including shootouts (W); 5) Greater number of points earned in head-to-head play; if teams played an uneven number of head-to-head games, the result of the first game on the home ice of the team with the extra home game is discarded; 6) Greater goal differential (GD); 7) Greater number of goals scored (GF)
x – Clinched playoff spot

== Schedule and results ==
=== Preseason ===
The Avalanche preseason schedule was released on June 20, 2024.

2024 preseason game log: 1–5–0 (home: 0–3–0; road: 1–2–0)

#	Date	Visitor	Score	Home	OT	Decision	Attendance	Record	Recap
1	September 23	Dallas	3–2	Colorado		Miner	15,006	0–1–0	
2	September 27	Colorado	2–4	Dallas		Mandolese	15,914	0–2–0	
3	September 29	Utah	6–3	Colorado		Annunen	17,392	0–3–0	
4	October 1	Vegas	6–1	Colorado		Georgiev	15,729	0–4–0	
5	October 3	Colorado	3–1	Vegas		Annunen	17,419	1–4–0	
6	October 5	Colorado	1–2	Utah		Georgiev	—	1–5–0	

Legend

Win Loss OT/SO Loss

=== Regular season ===
The regular season schedule was released on July 2, 2024.

2024–25 game log

October: 5–6–0 (home: 2–5–0; road: 3–1–0)
#	Date	Opponent	Score	OT	Decision	Attendance	Record	Pts	Recap
1	October 9	@ Vegas	4–8		Georgiev	18,388	0–1–0	0
2	October 12	Columbus	4–6		Annunen	18,080	0–2–0	0
3	October 14	NY Islanders	2–6		Georgiev	18,017	0–3–0	0
4	October 16	Boston	3–5		Georgiev	18,024	0–4–0	0
5	October 18	Anaheim	4–3	OT	Georgiev	18,071	1–4–0	2
6	October 20	@ San Jose	4–1		Annunen	14,125	2–4–0	4
7	October 22	@ Seattle	3–2		Annunen	17,151	3–4–0	6
8	October 24	@ Utah	5–1		Annunen	11,131	4–4–0	8
9	October 27	Ottawa	5–4		Annunen	18,020	5–4–0	10
10	October 28	Chicago	2–5		Georgiev	18,010	5–5–0	10
11	October 30	Tampa Bay	2–5		Kahkonen	18,019	5–6–0	10

November: 8–6–0 (home: 5–3–0; road: 3–3–0)
#	Date	Opponent	Score	OT	Decision	Attendance	Record	Pts	Recap
12	November 2	@ Nashville	2–5		Annunen	17,213	5–7–0	10
13	November 5	Seattle	6–3		Annunen	18,014	6–7–0	12
14	November 7	@ Winnipeg	0–1		Georgiev	12,918	6–8–0	12
15	November 9	Carolina	6–4		Georgiev	18,089	7–8–0	14
16	November 11	Nashville	3–2	OT	Georgiev	18,016	8–8–0	16
17	November 13	Los Angeles	4–2		Georgiev	18,059	9–8–0	18
18	November 15	Washington	2–5		Annunen	18,083	9–9–0	18
19	November 18	@ Philadelphia	3–2		Annunen	18,930	10–9–0	20
20	November 21	@ Washington	2–1		Georgiev	17,414	11–9–0	22
21	November 23	@ Florida	7–4		Georgiev	18,638	12–9–0	24
22	November 25	@ Tampa Bay	2–8		Annunen	19,092	12–10–0	24
23	November 27	Vegas	2–1	SO	Georgiev	18,078	13–10–0	26
24	November 29	@ Dallas	3–5		Georgiev	18,532	13–11–0	26
25	November 30	Edmonton	1–4		Georgiev	18,080	13–12–0	26

December: 10–3–0 (home: 3–1–0; road: 7–2–0)
#	Date	Opponent	Score	OT	Decision	Attendance	Record	Pts	Recap
26	December 3	@ Buffalo	5–4		Wedgewood	14,942	14–12–0	28
27	December 5	@ Carolina	3–5		Wedgewood	18,700	14–13–0	28
28	December 7	@ Detroit	2–1		Georgiev	19,515	15–13–0	30
29	December 8	@ New Jersey	4–0		Wedgewood	15,044	16–13–0	32
30	December 10	@ Pittsburgh	6–2		Wedgewood	15,632	17–13–0	34
31	December 12	Utah	1–4		Wedgewood	18,031	17–14–0	34
32	December 14	Nashville	5–2		Blackwood	18,049	18–14–0	36
33	December 16	@ Vancouver	1–3		Blackwood	18,856	18–15–0	36
34	December 19	@ San Jose	4–2		Blackwood	12,517	19–15–0	38
35	December 20	@ Anaheim	4–2		Wedgewood	16,226	20–15–0	40
36	December 22	Seattle	5–2		Blackwood	18,089	21–15–0	42
37	December 27	@ Utah	4–1		Blackwood	11,131	22–15–0	44
38	December 31	Winnipeg	5–2		Blackwood	18,094	23–15–0	46

January: 7–6–2 (home: 5–2–2; road: 2–4–0)
#	Date	Opponent	Score	OT	Decision	Attendance	Record	Pts	Recap
39	January 2	Buffalo	6–5	OT	Blackwood	18,081	24–15–0	48
40	January 4	Montreal	1–2	SO	Blackwood	18,087	24–15–1	49
41	January 6	Florida	3–1		Blackwood	18,024	25–15–1	51
42	January 8	@ Chicago	1–3		Miner	17,667	25–16–1	51
43	January 9	@ Minnesota	6–1		Blackwood	18,979	26–16–1	53
44	January 11	@ Winnipeg	0–3		Blackwood	14,782	26–17–1	53
45	January 14	NY Rangers	3–2	OT	Blackwood	18,037	27–17–1	55
46	January 16	Edmonton	3–4		Blackwood	18,054	27–18–1	55
47	January 18	Dallas	6–3		Wedgewood	18,055	28–18–1	57
48	January 20	Minnesota	1–3		Blackwood	18,072	28–19–1	57
49	January 22	Winnipeg	2–3	OT	Blackwood	18,125	28–19–2	58
50	January 25	@ Boston	1–3		Wedgewood	17,850	28–20–2	58
51	January 26	@ NY Rangers	5–4		Blackwood	18,006	29–20–2	60
52	January 28	@ NY Islanders	2–5		Blackwood	15,735	29–21–2	60
53	January 31	St. Louis	5–0		Blackwood	18,073	30–21–2	62

February: 5–3–0 (home: 3–0–0; road: 2–3–0)
#	Date	Opponent	Score	OT	Decision	Attendance	Record	Pts	Recap
54	February 2	Philadelphia	2–0		Blackwood	18,076	31–21–2	64
55	February 4	@ Vancouver	0–3		Blackwood	18,924	31–22–2	64
56	February 6	@ Calgary	4–2		Blackwood	17,345	32–22–2	66
57	February 7	@ Edmonton	5–4		Blackwood	18,347	33–22–2	68
58	February 22	@ Nashville	1–2		Wedgewood	17,159	33–23–2	68
59	February 23	@ St. Louis	1–3		Blackwood	17,806	33–24–2	68
60	February 26	New Jersey	5–1		Blackwood	18,087	34–24–2	70
61	February 28	Minnesota	5–2		Blackwood	18,091	35–24–2	72

March: 10–2–2 (home: 7–1–1; road: 3–1–1)
#	Date	Opponent	Score	OT	Decision	Attendance	Record	Pts	Recap
62	March 4	Pittsburgh	4–1		Wedgewood	18,037	36–24–2	74
63	March 6	San Jose	7–3		Blackwood	18,077	37–24–2	76
64	March 8	Toronto	7–4		Blackwood	18,094	38–24–2	78
65	March 10	Chicago	3–0		Wedgewood	18,072	39–24–2	80
66	March 11	@ Minnesota	1–2	SO	Blackwood	18,901	39–24–3	81
67	March 14	@ Calgary	4–2		Wedgewood	18,717	40–24–3	83
68	March 16	Dallas	4–3	OT	Wedgewood	18,131	41–24–3	85
69	March 19	@ Toronto	1–2		Blackwood	18,731	41–25–3	85
70	March 20	@ Ottawa	5–1		Wedgewood	17,856	42–25–3	87
71	March 22	@ Montreal	5–4	SO	Blackwood	21,105	43–25–3	89
72	March 25	Detroit	5–2		Blackwood	18,101	44–25–3	91
73	March 27	Los Angeles	4–0		Blackwood	18,087	45–25–3	93
74	March 29	St. Louis	1–2		Blackwood	18,129	45–26–3	93
75	March 31	Calgary	2–3	SO	Wedgewood	18,075	45–26–4	94

April: 4–3–0 (home: 1–1–0; road: 3–2–0)
#	Date	Opponent	Score	OT	Decision	Attendance	Record	Pts	Recap
76	April 2	@ Chicago	3–2	SO	Wedgewood	16,649	46–26–4	96
77	April 3	@ Columbus	7–3		Blackwood	18,392	47–26–4	98
78	April 5	@ St. Louis	4–5		Blackwood	18,096	47–27–4	98
79	April 8	Vegas	3–2	SO	Wedgewood	18,077	48–27–4	100
80	April 10	Vancouver	1–4		Blackwood	18,092	48–28–4	100
81	April 12	@ Los Angeles	4–5		Blackwood	17,355	48–29–4	100
82	April 13	@ Anaheim	4–2		Wedgewood	17,241	49–29–4	102

Legend: Win (2 points) Loss (0 points) OT/SO loss (1 point)

=== Playoffs ===
2025 Stanley Cup playoffs

Western Conference first round vs. (C2) Dallas Stars: Dallas wins 4–3
#	Date	Opponent	Score	OT	Decision	Attendance	Series	Recap
1	April 19	@ Dallas	5–1		Blackwood	18,532	1–0
2	April 21	@ Dallas	3–4	OT	Blackwood	18,532	1–1
3	April 23	Dallas	1–2	OT	Blackwood	18,109	1–2
4	April 26	Dallas	4–0		Blackwood	18,129	2–2
5	April 28	@ Dallas	2–6		Blackwood	18,532	2–3
6	May 1	Dallas	7–4		Blackwood	18,099	3–3
7	May 3	@ Dallas	2–4		Blackwood	18,532	3–4

Legend: Win Loss

== Player statistics ==
As of end of regular season

=== Skaters ===
Regular season
Player	GP	G	A	Pts	+/–	PIM
Nathan MacKinnon	79	32	84	116	+25	41
Cale Makar	80	30	62	92	+28	14
Mikko Rantanen^{‡}	49	25	39	64	+12	28
Artturi Lehkonen	69	27	18	45	+36	34
Devon Toews	76	10	34	44	+30	26
Jonathan Drouin	43	11	26	37	+4	6
Valeri Nichushkin	43	21	13	34	+11	8
Casey Mittelstadt^{‡}	63	11	23	34	−12	20
Ross Colton	61	16	13	29	−1	18
Martin Necas^{†}	30	11	17	28	+1	6
Sam Girard	73	3	21	24	+7	14
Joel Kiviranta	79	16	7	23	+15	20
Logan O'Connor	80	10	11	21	−4	26
Parker Kelly	80	8	11	19	−1	29
Sam Malinski	76	5	10	15	+8	16
Josh Manson	48	1	14	15	−6	28
Brock Nelson^{†}	19	6	7	13	+6	4
Charlie Coyle^{†}	19	2	11	13	+5	6
Jack Drury^{†}	33	5	4	9	0	10
Ivan Ivan	40	5	3	8	−9	8
Miles Wood	37	4	4	8	−5	48
Nikolai Kovalenko^{‡}	28	4	4	8	−7	10
Calvin de Haan^{‡}	44	0	7	7	−8	10
Juuso Parssinen^{†}	22	2	4	6	+2	8
Oliver Kylington^{‡}	13	1	3	4	−3	4
Ryan Lindgren^{†}	18	2	1	3	−1	4
Erik Johnson^{†}	14	1	1	2	+4	4
Jimmy Vesey^{†}	10	1	1	2	−2	0
Keaton Middleton	41	0	2	2	0	28
John Ludvig	8	0	2	2	−4	6
Chris Wagner	28	1	0	1	−8	14
Wyatt Aamodt	2	1	0	1	+1	0
Calum Ritchie^{‡}	7	1	0	1	−7	0
T. J. Tynan	8	0	1	1	−1	4
Givani Smith^{†}	7	0	0	0	−2	8
Tye Felhaber	5	0	0	0	−1	0
Matt Stienburg	8	0	0	0	0	22
Jack Ahcan	2	0	0	0	0	2
Chase Bradley	2	0	0	0	0	0
Oskar Olausson	2	0	0	0	0	0
Jason Polin	2	0	0	0	0	0
Jere Innala	17	0	0	0	−3	2
Nikita Prishchepov	10	0	0	0	0	0

=== Goaltenders ===
Regular season
Player	GP	GS	TOI	W	L	OT	GA	GAA	SA	SV%	SO	G	A	PIM
Mackenzie Blackwood^{†}	37	36	2165:05	22	12	3	84	2.33	965	.913	3	0	1	2
Scott Wedgewood^{†}	19	18	1113:04	13	4	1	37	1.99	446	.917	2	0	0	0
Alexandar Georgiev^{‡}	18	17	940:53	8	7	0	53	3.38	421	.874	0	0	1	0
Justus Annunen^{‡}	11	9	520:50	6	4	0	28	3.23	218	.872	0	0	0	0
Trent Miner	2	1	91:38	0	1	0	4	2.62	33	.879	0	0	0	0
Kaapo Kahkonen	1	1	58:16	0	1	0	4	4.12	20	.800	0	0	0	0

^{†}Denotes player spent time with another team before joining the Avalanche. Stats reflect time with the Avalanche only.
^{‡}Denotes player was traded mid-season. Stats reflect time with the Avalanche only.
Bold/italics denotes franchise record.

== Suspensions/fines ==
Player	Explanation	Length	Salary	Date issued

== Awards and honours ==
=== Awards ===
Regular season
Player	Award	Awarded

=== Milestones ===
Regular season
Player	Milestone	Reached

=== Records ===
Regular season
Player	Record	Reached

== Transactions ==
The Avalanche have been involved in the following transactions during the 2024–25 season.

Key:

† Contract is entry-level.
‡ Contract initially takes effect in the 2025–26 season.

=== Trades ===
Date	Details		Ref
June 28, 2024	To Utah Hockey Club 1st-round pick in 2024 (#24 overall)	To Colorado Avalanche 2nd-round pick in 2024 (#38 overall); 2nd-round pick in 2024 (#71 overall); NYR 2nd-round pick in 2025	
June 29, 2024	To Buffalo Sabres UTA 3rd-round pick in 2024 (#71 overall)	To Colorado Avalanche 3rd-round pick in 2024 (#76 overall); FLA 5th-round pick in 2024 (#161 overall)	
July 15, 2024	To Ottawa Senators 6th-round pick in 2026	To Colorado Avalanche Kevin Mandolese; 7th-round pick in 2026	
October 6, 2024	To Vancouver Canucks Erik Brannstrom	To Colorado Avalanche Tucker Poolman*; 4th-round pick in 2025	
November 30, 2024	To Nashville Predators Justus Annunen; 6th-round pick in 2025	To Colorado Avalanche Scott Wedgewood	
December 9, 2024	To San Jose Sharks Alexandar Georgiev*; Nikolai Kovalenko conditional 5th-round pick in 2025^{1} 2nd-round pick in 2026	To Colorado Avalanche Mackenzie Blackwood; Givani Smith; 5th-round pick in 2027	
December 28, 2024	To Nashville Predators Ondrej Pavel; 3rd-round pick in 2027	To Colorado Avalanche Juuso Parssinen; NYR 7th-round pick in 2026	
January 24, 2025	To Carolina Hurricanes Taylor Hall (from CHI); Nils Juntorp (from CHI); Mikko Rantanen (from COL)	To Colorado Avalanche Jack Drury; Martin Necas; 2nd-round pick in 2025; 4th-round pick in 2026	
March 1, 2025	To New York Rangers Calvin de Haan; Juuso Parssinen conditional CAR 2nd-round pick in 2025 or NYR 2nd-round pick in 2025 conditional COL 4th-round pick in 2025 or VAN 4th-round pick in 2025	To Colorado Avalanche Hank Kempf; Ryan Lindgren*; Jimmy Vesey	
March 7, 2025	To New York Islanders Oliver Kylington; Calum Ritchie conditional 1st-round pick in 2026 or 1st-round pick in 2027 conditional 3rd-round pick in 2028	To Colorado Avalanche William Dufour; Brock Nelson*	
March 7, 2025	To Boston Bruins Casey Mittelstadt; William Zellers; CAR 2nd-round pick in 2025	To Colorado Avalanche Charlie Coyle; 5th-round pick in 2026	

Notes

- San Jose will receive the later of Colorado or Vancouver's fourth-round pick if at least two of these three conditions are met: Colorado advances to the third round of the 2025 NHL Playoffs; Blackwood starts 30 regular season games in the 2024-25 season; or Blackwood wins 25 regular season games in the 2024-25 season. Otherwise, San Jose will receive Colorado's fifth-round pick in 2025.

=== Players acquired ===
Date	Player	Former team	Term	Via	Ref
July 1, 2024	Calvin de Haan	Tampa Bay Lightning	1-year	Free Agency	
July 1, 2024	Parker Kelly	Ottawa Senators	2-year	Free Agency	
July 1, 2024	Jacob MacDonald	San Jose Sharks	2-year	Free Agency	
July 1, 2024	Calle Rosen	St. Louis Blues	1-year	Free Agency	
July 1, 2024	T. J. Tynan	Los Angeles Kings	1-year	Free Agency	
July 2, 2024	Erik Brannstrom	Ottawa Senators	1-year	Free agency	
August 5, 2024	Oliver Kylington	Calgary Flames	1-year	Free agency	
August 9, 2024	Matthew Phillips	Washington Capitals	1-year	Free Agency	
October 11, 2024	Kaapo Kahkonen	Winnipeg Jets		Waivers	

=== Players lost ===
Date	Player	New team	Term	Via	Ref
July 1, 2024	Nate Clurman	Pittsburgh Penguins	1-year	Free Agency	
July 1, 2024	Brandon Duhaime	Washington Capitals	2-year	Free Agency	
July 1, 2024	Corey Schueneman	St. Louis Blues	1-year	Free Agency	
July 1, 2024	Yakov Trenin	Minnesota Wild	4-year	Free Agency	
July 1, 2024	Riley Tufte	Boston Bruins	1-year	Free Agency	
July 1, 2024	Sean Walker	Carolina Hurricanes	5-year	Free Agency	
July 2, 2024	Jack Johnson	Columbus Blue Jackets	1-year	Free agency	
July 2, 2024	Spencer Smallman	Washington Capitals	1-year	Free agency	
July 5, 2024	Caleb Jones	Los Angeles Kings	1-year	Free Agency	

=== Signings ===
Date	Player	Term	Ref
July 2, 2024	Chase Bradley	2-year†	
July 9, 2024	Calum Ritchie	3-year†	
December 15, 2024	Tye Felhaber	2-year	

== Draft picks ==
Below are the Colorado Avalamche's selections at the 2024 NHL entry draft, which was held on June 28 and 29, 2024, at the Sphere in Paradise, Nevada.

Round	#	Player	Pos	Nationality	College/Junior/Club team (League)
2	38	Ilya Nabokov	G	Russia	Metallurg Magnitogorsk (KHL)
3	76	William Zellers	C	United States	Shattuck-Saint Mary's Sabres (USHS)
4	121	Jake Fisher	C	United States	Fargo Force (USHL)
5	132	Louka Cloutier	G	Canada	Chicago Steel (USHL)
5	137	Ivan Yunin	G	Russia	Omskie Yastreby (MHL)
5	161	Maxmilian Curran	C	Czech Republic	Tri-City Americans (WHL)
6	185	Tory Pitner	D	United States	Youngstown Phantoms (USHL)
7	215	Christian Humphreys	C	United States	U.S. NTDP (USHL)
7	217	Tory Pitner	C	Russia	Victoriaville Tigres (QMJHL)
