= 2024–25 Philadelphia Flyers season =

National Hockey League season

2024–25 Philadelphia Flyers
- Division: 8th Metropolitan
- Conference: 16th Eastern
- 2024–25 record: 33–39–10
- Home record: 20–20–1
- Road record: 13–19–9
- Goals for: 238
- Goals against: 286

Team information
- General manager: Daniel Briere
- Coach: John Tortorella (Oct. 11 – Mar. 27); Brad Shaw (interim, Mar. 27 – Apr. 17)
- Captain: Sean Couturier
- Alternate captains: Travis Konecny; Scott Laughton (Oct. 11 – Mar. 7)
- Arena: Wells Fargo Center
- Average attendance: 18,525
- Minor league affiliates: Lehigh Valley Phantoms (AHL); Reading Royals (ECHL)

Team leaders
- Goals: Matvei Michkov (26)
- Assists: Travis Konecny (52)
- Points: Travis Konecny (76)
- Penalty minutes: Garnet Hathaway (58)
- Plus/minus: Nick Seeler (+10)
- Wins: Samuel Ersson (22)
- Goals against average: Samuel Ersson (3.14)

The 2024–25 Philadelphia Flyers season was the 58th season for the National Hockey League (NHL) franchise that was established on June 5, 1967.

On April 5, the Flyers were eliminated from playoff contention after a 3–2 loss to the Montreal Canadiens, missing the playoffs for the fifth consecutive season, tying the longest playoff drought in franchise history when they missed the playoffs for five consecutive seasons from 1990 to 1994.

== Regular season ==
After winning only one game in a twelve game stretch, head coach John Tortorella was fired on March 27. Associate coach Brad Shaw was named interim head coach.

== Standings ==
=== Divisional standings ===
Metropolitan Division
Pos	Team	GP	W	L	OTL	RW	GF	GA	GD	Pts
1	z – Washington Capitals	82	51	22	9	43	288	232	+56	111
2	x – Carolina Hurricanes	82	47	30	5	42	266	233	+33	99
3	x – New Jersey Devils	82	42	33	7	36	242	222	+20	91
4	Columbus Blue Jackets	82	40	33	9	30	273	268	+5	89
5	New York Rangers	82	39	36	7	35	256	255	+1	85
6	New York Islanders	82	35	35	12	28	224	260	−36	82
7	Pittsburgh Penguins	82	34	36	12	24	243	293	−50	80
8	Philadelphia Flyers	82	33	39	10	21	238	286	−48	76

Source: National Hockey League
Rules for classification: 1) Fewer number of games played (GP, only during regular season); 2) Greater number of regulation wins (RW); 3) Greater number of wins in regulation and overtime, excluding shootout wins (ROW); 4) Greater number of total wins, including shootouts (W); 5) Greater number of points earned in head-to-head play; if teams played an uneven number of head-to-head games, the result of the first game on the home ice of the team with the extra home game is discarded; 6) Greater goal differential (GD); 7) Greater number of goals scored (GF)
x – Clinched playoff spot; z – Clinched conference

=== Conference standings ===
Eastern Conference Wild Card
Pos	Div	Team	GP	W	L	OTL	RW	GF	GA	GD	Pts
1	AT	x – Ottawa Senators	82	45	30	7	35	243	234	+9	97
2	AT	x – Montreal Canadiens	82	40	31	11	30	245	265	−20	91
3	ME	Columbus Blue Jackets	82	40	33	9	30	273	268	+5	89
4	AT	Detroit Red Wings	82	39	35	8	30	238	259	−21	86
5	ME	New York Rangers	82	39	36	7	35	256	255	+1	85
6	ME	New York Islanders	82	35	35	12	28	224	260	−36	82
7	ME	Pittsburgh Penguins	82	34	36	12	24	243	293	−50	80
8	AT	Buffalo Sabres	82	36	39	7	29	269	289	−20	79
9	AT	Boston Bruins	82	33	39	10	26	222	272	−50	76
10	ME	Philadelphia Flyers	82	33	39	10	21	238	286	−48	76

Source: National Hockey League
Rules for classification: 1) Fewer number of games played (GP, only during regular season); 2) Greater number of regulation wins (RW); 3) Greater number of wins in regulation and overtime, excluding shootout wins (ROW); 4) Greater number of total wins, including shootouts (W); 5) Greater number of points earned in head-to-head play; if teams played an uneven number of head-to-head games, the result of the first game on the home ice of the team with the extra home game is discarded; 6) Greater goal differential (GD); 7) Greater number of goals scored (GF)
x – Clinched playoff spot

== Schedule and results ==
=== Pre-season ===
The pre-season schedule was announced on June 17, 2024.

2024 pre-season game log: 4–3–0 (home: 3–0–0; road: 1–3–0)

Game	Date	Opponent	Score	OT	Decision	Location	Attendance	Record	Recap
1	September 22	@ Washington	6–2		Fedotov	Capital One Arena	12,851	1–0–0	
2	September 23	@ Montreal	0–5		Makiniemi	Bell Centre	20,690	1–1–0	
3	September 26	NY Islanders	2–0		Ersson	Wells Fargo Center	11,716	2–1–0	
4	September 28	Boston	3–2	OT	Fedotov	Wells Fargo Center	13,863	3–1–0	
5	September 30	@ NY Islanders	3–4		Kolosov	UBS Arena	10,564	3–2–0	
6	October 1	@ Boston	1–4		Ersson	TD Garden	17,850	3–3–0	
7	October 3	New Jersey	5–4		Kolosov	Wells Fargo Center	12,751	4–3–0	

=== Regular season ===
The regular season schedule was announced on July 2, 2024.

2024–25 game log
October: 4–6–1 (home: 2–3–0; road: 2–3–1)

Game	Date	Opponent	Score	OT	Decision	Location	Attendance	Record	Points	Recap
1	October 11	@ Vancouver	3–2	SO	Ersson	Rogers Arena	18,875	1–0–0	2	
2	October 12	@ Calgary	3–6		Fedotov	Scotiabank Saddledome	19,289	1–1–0	2	
3	October 15	@ Edmonton	3–4	OT	Ersson	Rogers Place	18,347	1–1–1	3	
4	October 17	@ Seattle	4–6		Fedotov	Climate Pledge Arena	17,151	1–2–1	3	
5	October 19	Vancouver	0–3		Ersson	Wells Fargo Center	19,083	1–3–1	3	
6	October 22	Washington	1–4		Ersson	Wells Fargo Center	18,132	1–4–1	3	
7	October 23	@ Washington	3–6		Fedotov	Capital One Arena	17,254	1–5–1	3	
8	October 26	Minnesota	7–5		Ersson	Wells Fargo Center	18,238	2–5–1	5	
9	October 27	Montreal	3–4		Kolosov	Wells Fargo Center	17,440	2–6–1	5	
10	October 29	@ Boston	2–0		Ersson	TD Garden	17,850	3–6–1	7	
11	October 31	St. Louis	2–1		Ersson	Wells Fargo Center	14,122	4–6–1	9	

November: 8–4–2 (home: 4–3–1; road: 4–1–1)

Game	Date	Opponent	Score	OT	Decision	Location	Attendance	Record	Points	Recap
12	November 2	Boston	0–3		Kolosov	Wells Fargo Center	17,429	4–7–1	9	
13	November 5	@ Carolina	4–6		Kolosov	Lenovo Center	18,700	4–8–1	9	
14	November 7	@ Tampa Bay	2–1	SO	Fedotov	Amalie Arena	19,092	5–8–1	11	
15	November 9	@ Florida	3–4	SO	Ersson	Amerant Bank Arena	19,547	5–8–2	12	
16	November 11	San Jose	4–3	SO	Ersson	Wells Fargo Center	18,706	6–8–2	14	
17	November 14	@ Ottawa	5–4	OT	Fedotov	Canadian Tire Centre	17,162	7–8–2	16	
18	November 16	Buffalo	5–2		Fedotov	Wells Fargo Center	18,793	8–8–2	18	
19	November 18	Colorado	2–3		Kolosov	Wells Fargo Center	18,930	8–9–2	18	
20	November 20	Carolina	1–4		Fedotov	Wells Fargo Center	17,535	8–10–2	18	
21	November 23	Chicago	3–2	OT	Kolosov	Wells Fargo Center	18,714	9–10–2	20	
22	November 25	Vegas	4–5	SO	Fedotov	Wells Fargo Center	18,050	9–10–3	21	
23	November 27	@ Nashville	3–2	OT	Kolosov	Bridgestone Arena	17,159	10–10–3	23	
24	November 29	NY Rangers	3–1		Fedotov	Wells Fargo Center	19,346	11–10–3	25	
25	November 30	@ St. Louis	3–2	OT	Kolosov	Enterprise Center	16,863	12–10–3	27	

December: 5–7–1 (home: 2–3–0; road: 3–4–1)

Game	Date	Opponent	Score	OT	Decision	Location	Attendance	Record	Points	Recap
26	December 5	Florida	5–7		Fedotov	Wells Fargo Center	18,206	12–11–3	27	
27	December 7	@ Boston	3–4	OT	Kolosov	TD Garden	17,850	12–11–4	28	
28	December 8	Utah	2–4		Ersson	Wells Fargo Center	17,462	12–12–4	28	
29	December 10	@ Columbus	5–3		Ersson	Nationwide Arena	15,467	13–12–4	30	
30	December 12	Detroit	4–1		Kolosov	Wells Fargo Center	18,377	14–12–4	32	
31	December 14	@ Minnesota	1–4		Ersson	Xcel Energy Center	18,076	14–13–4	32	
32	December 18	@ Detroit	4–6		Ersson	Little Caesars Arena	19,515	14–14–4	32	
33	December 19	Los Angeles	3–7		Kolosov	Wells Fargo Center	18,551	14–15–4	32	
34	December 21	Columbus	5–4	OT	Ersson	Wells Fargo Center	18,644	15–15–4	34	
35	December 23	@ Pittsburgh	3–7		Ersson	PPG Paints Arena	18,290	15–16–4	34	
36	December 28	@ Anaheim	3–1		Ersson	Honda Center	16,472	16–16–4	36	
37	December 29	@ Los Angeles	4–5		Kolosov	Crypto.com Arena	18,145	16–17–4	36	
38	December 31	@ San Jose	4–0		Ersson	SAP Center	14,816	17–17–4	38	

January: 6–7–2 (home: 4–3–0; road: 2–4–2)

Game	Date	Opponent	Score	OT	Decision	Location	Attendance	Record	Points	Recap
39	January 2	@ Vegas	2–5		Kolosov	T-Mobile Arena	17,909	17–18–4	38	
40	January 5	@ Toronto	2–3	OT	Fedotov	Scotiabank Arena	18,554	17–18–5	39	
41	January 7	Toronto	2–3		Fedotov	Wells Fargo Center	18,058	17–19–5	39	
42	January 9	Dallas	1–4		Ersson	Wells Fargo Center	17,941	17–20–5	39	
43	January 11	Anaheim	6–0		Ersson	Wells Fargo Center	19,154	18–20–5	41	
44	January 13	Florida	4–3		Ersson	Wells Fargo Center	19,293	19–20–5	43	
45	January 14	@ Columbus	2–3	SO	Fedotov	Nationwide Arena	15,018	19–20–6	44	
46	January 16	@ NY Islanders	5–3		Ersson	UBS Arena	15,761	20–20–6	46	
47	January 18	@ New Jersey	1–3		Ersson	Prudential Center	16,514	21–20–6	48	
48	January 21	Detroit	2–1	OT	Ersson	Wells Fargo Center	17,635	22–20–6	50	
49	January 23	@ NY Rangers	1–6		Ersson	Madison Square Garden	18,006	22–21–6	50	
50	January 24	@ NY Islanders	1–3		Fedotov	UBS Arena	17,255	22–22–6	50	
51	January 27	New Jersey	4–2		Ersson	Wells Fargo Center	19,380	23–22–6	52	
52	January 29	@ New Jersey	0–5		Ersson	Prudential Center	16,026	23–23–6	52	
53	January 30	NY Islanders	0–3		Fedotov	Wells Fargo Center	18,703	23–24–6	52	

February: 3–2–2 (home: 3–1–0; road: 0–1–2)

Game	Date	Opponent	Score	OT	Decision	Location	Attendance	Record	Points	Recap
54	February 2	@ Colorado	0–2		Ersson	Ball Arena	18,076	23–25–6	52	
55	February 4	@ Utah	2–3	OT	Ersson	Delta Center	11,131	23–25–7	53	
56	February 6	Washington	3–4		Fedotov	Wells Fargo Center	18,726	23–26–7	53	
57	February 8	Pittsburgh	3–2		Ersson	Wells Fargo Center	19,280	24–26–7	55	
58	February 22	Edmonton	6–3		Ersson	Wells Fargo Center	19,847	25–26–7	57	
59	February 25	Pittsburgh	6–1		Ersson	Wells Fargo Center	19,089	26–26–7	59	
60	February 27	@ Pittsburgh	4–5	OT	Ersson	PPG Paints Arena	16,630	26–26–8	60	

March: 5–10–1 (home: 4–6–0; road: 1–4–1)

Game	Date	Opponent	Score	OT	Decision	Location	Attendance	Record	Points	Recap
61	March 1	@ Winnipeg	2–1	SO	Fedotov	Canada Life Centre	14,436	27–26–8	62	
62	March 4	Calgary	3–6		Fedotov	Wells Fargo Center	18,510	27–27–8	62	
63	March 6	Winnipeg	1–4		Ersson	Wells Fargo Center	18,619	27–28–8	62	
64	March 8	Seattle	1–4		Ersson	Wells Fargo Center	19,264	27–29–8	62	
65	March 9	New Jersey	1–3		Fedotov	Wells Fargo Center	19,271	27–30–8	62	
66	March 11	Ottawa	2–5		Fedotov	Wells Fargo Center	18,201	27–31–8	62	
67	March 13	Tampa Bay	4–3	SO	Ersson	Wells Fargo Center	18,405	28–31–8	64	
68	March 15	Carolina	0–5		Ersson	Wells Fargo Center	18,801	28–32–8	64	
69	March 17	@ Tampa Bay	0–2		Fedotov	Amalie Arena	19,092	28–33–8	64	
70	March 20	@ Washington	2–3		Ersson	Capital One Arena	18,573	28–34–8	64	
71	March 22	@ Dallas	2–3	OT	Ersson	American Airlines Center	18,532	28–34–9	65	
72	March 23	@ Chicago	4–7		Fedotov	United Center	20,125	28–35–9	65	
73	March 25	@ Toronto	2–7		Ersson	Scotiabank Arena	18,691	28–36–9	65	
74	March 27	Montreal	6–4		Ersson	Wells Fargo Center	19,284	29–36–9	67	
75	March 29	Buffalo	7–4		Ersson	Wells Fargo Center	19,092	30–36–9	69	
76	March 31	Nashville	2–1		Fedotov	Wells Fargo Center	18,858	31–36–9	71	

April: 2–3–1 (home: 1–1–0; road: 1–2–1)

Game	Date	Opponent	Score	OT	Decision	Location	Attendance	Record	Points	Recap
77	April 5	@ Montreal	2–3		Ersson	Bell Centre	21,105	31–37–9	71	
78	April 9	@ NY Rangers	8–5		Kolosov	Madison Square Garden	17,530	32–37–9	73	
79	April 12	NY Islanders	4–3	SO	Ersson	Wells Fargo Center	19,259	33–37–9	75	
80	April 13	@ Ottawa	3–4	OT	Fedotov	Canadian Tire Centre	16,059	33–37–10	76	
81	April 15	Columbus	0–3		Ersson	Wells Fargo Center	19,105	33–38–10	76	
82	April 17	@ Buffalo	4–5		Kolosov	KeyBank Center	16,633	33–39–10	76	

Legend: = Win = Loss = OT/SO Loss

== Player statistics ==
=== Scoring ===
- Position abbreviations: C = Center; D = Defense; G = Goaltender; LW = Left wing; RW = Right wing
- † = Joined team via a transaction (e.g., trade, waivers, signing) during the season. Stats reflect time with the Flyers only.
- ‡ = Left team via a transaction (e.g., trade, waivers, release) during the season. Stats reflect time with the Flyers only.

No.	Player	Pos	Regular season					
No.	Player	Pos	GP	G	A	Pts	+/-	PIM
11	Travis Konecny	RW	82	24	52	76	−17	53
39	Matvei Michkov	RW	80	26	37	63	−18	46
14	Sean Couturier	C	79	15	30	45	1	41
71	Tyson Foerster	RW	81	25	18	43	−9	49
74	Owen Tippett	RW	77	20	23	43	−12	16
10	Bobby Brink	RW	79	12	29	41	−11	22
27	Noah Cates	LW	78	16	21	37	3	14
25	Ryan Poehling	C	68	12	19	31	−4	16
6	Travis Sanheim	D	82	8	22	30	−6	40
21	Scott Laughton‡	C	60	11	16	27	−17	21
48	Morgan Frost‡	C	49	11	14	25	−11	16
19	Garnet Hathaway	RW	67	10	11	21	5	58
9	Jamie Drysdale	D	70	7	13	20	−32	22
24	Nick Seeler	D	77	3	17	20	10	36
86	Joel Farabee‡	LW	50	8	11	19	−12	26
55	Rasmus Ristolainen	D	63	4	15	19	3	14
8	Cam York	D	66	4	13	17	−8	26
5	Egor Zamula	D	63	3	12	15	−14	6
22	Jakob Pelletier†	LW	25	3	5	8	−3	4
36	Emil Andrae	D	42	1	6	7	−5	16
90	Anthony Richard	C	15	2	4	6	−3	0
18	Rodrigo Abols	C	22	2	3	5	−10	4
96	Andrei Kuzmenko†‡	LW	7	2	3	5	−5	0
15	Olle Lycksell	RW	19	0	5	5	−3	2
44	Nicolas Deslauriers	LW	31	2	1	3	−9	15
77	Erik Johnson‡	D	22	1	2	3	−3	11
3	Helge Grans	D	6	0	1	1	0	2
23	Karsen Dorwart†	C	5	0	0	0	−1	2
33	Samuel Ersson	G	47	0	0	0		2
82	Ivan Fedotov	G	26	0	0	0		0
78	Jacob Gaucher†	C	4	0	0	0	0	0
13	Adam Ginning	D	1	0	0	0	−1	0
12	Devin Kaplan	RW	1	0	0	0	−1	0
35	Aleksei Kolosov	G	17	0	0	0		0
17	Jett Luchanko	C	4	0	0	0	−3	2

=== Goaltending ===
No.	Player	Regular season										
No.	Player	GP	GS	W	L	OT	SA	GA	GAA	SV%	SO	TOI
33	Samuel Ersson	47	45	22	17	5	1162	136	3.14	.883	2	2602
82	Ivan Fedotov	26	24	6	13	4	624	75	3.15	.880	0	1429
35	Aleksei Kolosov	17	13	5	9	1	406	54	3.59	.867	0	902

== Awards and records ==
=== Awards ===
Type	Award/honor	Recipient	Ref
League (annual)	NHL All-Rookie Team	Matvei Michkov (Forward)	
League (in-season)	NHL Rookie of the Month	Matvei Michkov (October)	
League (in-season)	NHL Rookie of the Month	Matvei Michkov (February)	
Team	Barry Ashbee Trophy	Travis Sanheim	
Team	Bobby Clarke Trophy	Travis Konecny	
Team	Flyers Alumni Community Leadership Award	Garnet Hathaway	
Team	Gene Hart Memorial Award	Noah Cates	
Team	Pelle Lindbergh Memorial Trophy	Bobby Brink	
Team	Toyota Cup	Matvei Michkov	
Team	Yanick Dupre Memorial Class Guy Award	Travis Sanheim	

=== Milestones ===
Milestone	Player	Date	Ref
First game	Jett Luchanko	October 11, 2024	
First game	Matvei Michkov	October 11, 2024	
First game	Aleksei Kolosov	October 27, 2024	
First game	Helge Grans	November 18, 2024	
First game	Rodrigo Abols	January 21, 2025	
First game	Jacob Gaucher	February 2, 2025	
First game	Karsen Dorwart	April 5, 2025	
First game	Devin Kaplan	April 17, 2025	
1st career NHL point 1st career NHL assist	Matvei Michkov	October 13, 2024	
1st career NHL point 1st career NHL assist	Emil Andrae	October 29, 2024	
1st career NHL point 1st career NHL assist	Helge Grans	November 18, 2024	
1st career NHL point 1st career NHL goal	Rodrigo Abols	February 4, 2025	
1st career NHL goal	Matvei Michkov	October 25, 2024	
1st career NHL goal	Emil Andrae	November 25, 2024	
1,000th game played	Erik Johnson	November 16, 2024	
500th career NHL point	Sean Couturier	October 26, 2024	
200th career NHL goal	Sean Couturier	February 22, 2025	

== Transactions ==
The Flyers have been involved in the following transactions during the 2024–25 season.

Key:

† Contract is entry-level.
‡ Contract initially takes effect in the 2025–26 season.

=== Trades ===
Date	Details		Ref
June 28, 2024	To Edmonton Oilers FLA 1st-round pick in 2024	To Philadelphia Flyers Conditional 1st-round pick in 2025	
June 28, 2024	To Minnesota Wild 1st-round pick in 2024	To Philadelphia Flyers 1st-round pick in 2024; 3rd-round pick in 2025	
June 29, 2024	To Calgary Flames LAK 5th-round pick in 2024; STL 6th-round pick in 2024	To Philadelphia Flyers NJD 4th-round pick in 2024	
June 29, 2024	To Nashville Predators 3rd-round pick in 2024; MIN 3rd-round pick in 2025	To Philadelphia Flyers WPG 2nd-round pick in 2024	
November 4, 2024	To Edmonton Oilers Ronnie Attard	To Philadelphia Flyers Ben Gleason	
January 31, 2025	To Calgary Flames Joel Farabee; Morgan Frost	To Philadelphia Flyers Andrei Kuzmenko; Jakob Pelletier; 2nd-round pick in 2025; 7th-round pick in 2028	
March 7, 2025	To Los Angeles Kings Andrei Kuzmenko; 7th-round pick in 2025	To Philadelphia Flyers 3rd-round pick in 2027	
March 7, 2025	To Toronto Maple Leafs Scott Laughton; 4th-round pick in 2025; 6th-round pick in 2027	To Philadelphia Flyers Nikita Grebenkin; Conditional 1st-round pick in 2027	
March 7, 2025	To Colorado Avalanche Erik Johnson	To Philadelphia Flyers Givani Smith	

=== Players acquired ===
Date	Player	Former team	Term	Via	Ref
July 2, 2024	Anthony Richard	Boston Bruins	2-year	Free agency	
September 25, 2024	Eetu Makiniemi	San Jose Sharks	1-year	Free agency	
December 12, 2024	Jacob Gaucher	Lehigh Valley Phantoms (AHL)	2-year†	Free agency	
March 29, 2025	Karsen Dorwart	Michigan State University (Big Ten)	2-year†	Free agency	

=== Players lost ===
Date	Player	New team	Term	Via	Ref
June 28, 2024	Cam Atkinson			Buyout	
July 1, 2024	Carter Hart			Contract expiration	
July 1, 2024	Tanner Laczynski	Vegas Golden Knights	2-year	Free agency	
July 1, 2024	Victor Mete			Contract expiration	
July 1, 2024	Felix Sandstrom	Buffalo Sabres	1-year	Free agency	
July 2, 2024	Cam Atkinson	Tampa Bay Lightning	1-year	Free agency	
July 10, 2024	Mason Millman	Providence Bruins (AHL)	1-year	Free agency	
July 15, 2024	Adam Brooks	EHC Red Bull München (DEL)	1-year	Free agency	
July 16, 2024	Will Zmolek	Iowa Wild (AHL)	1-year	Free agency	
July 30, 2024	Cooper Marody	Lehigh Valley Phantoms (AHL)	2-year	Free agency	
August 1, 2024	Denis Gurianov	HC CSKA Moscow (KHL)	2-year	Free agency	
August 21, 2024	Ryan Johansen			Contract termination	
September 5, 2024	Marc Staal			Retirement	
June 11, 2025	Eetu Makiniemi	HC TPS (Liiga)	1-year‡	Free agency	

=== Signings ===
Date	Player	Term	Ref
July 1, 2024	Garnet Hathaway	2-year‡	
July 1, 2024	Erik Johnson	1-year	
July 1, 2024	Matvei Michkov	3-year†	
July 3, 2024	Bobby Brink	2-year	
July 6, 2024	Jett Luchanko	3-year†	
July 7, 2024	Egor Zamula	2-year	
July 25, 2024	Travis Konecny	8-year‡	
September 27, 2024	Spencer Gill	3-year†	
March 26, 2025	Ty Murchison	2-year†‡	
April 15, 2025	Alex Bump	3-year†‡	
April 15, 2025	Devin Kaplan	3-year†	
May 15, 2025	Rodrigo Abols	1-year‡	
May 15, 2025	Oscar Eklind	1-year‡	
May 29, 2025	Tyson Foerster	2-year‡	
May 30, 2025	Helge Grans	2-year‡	
June 3, 2025	Noah Cates	4-year‡	

== Draft picks ==
Below are the Philadelphia Flyers' selections at the 2024 NHL entry draft, which was held on June 28 and 29, 2024, in Paradise, Nevada.

Round	#	Player	Pos	Nationality	Team (league)
1	13	Jett Luchanko	Center	Canada	Guelph Storm (OHL)
2	51	Jack Berglund	Center	Sweden	Färjestad BK (SHL)
2	59	Spencer Gill	Defense	Canada	Rimouski Océanic (QMJHL)
4	107	Heikki Ruohonen	Center	Finland	Kiekko-Espoo U20 (U20 SM-sarja)
5	148	Noah Powell	Right wing	United States	Dubuque Fighting Saints (USHL)
6	173	Ilya Pautov	Right wing	Russia	Krasnaya Armiya (MHL)
7	205	Austin Moline	Defense	United States	Shattuck-Saint Mary's (USHS-MN)
