= Filip Roos =

Swedish ice hockey player

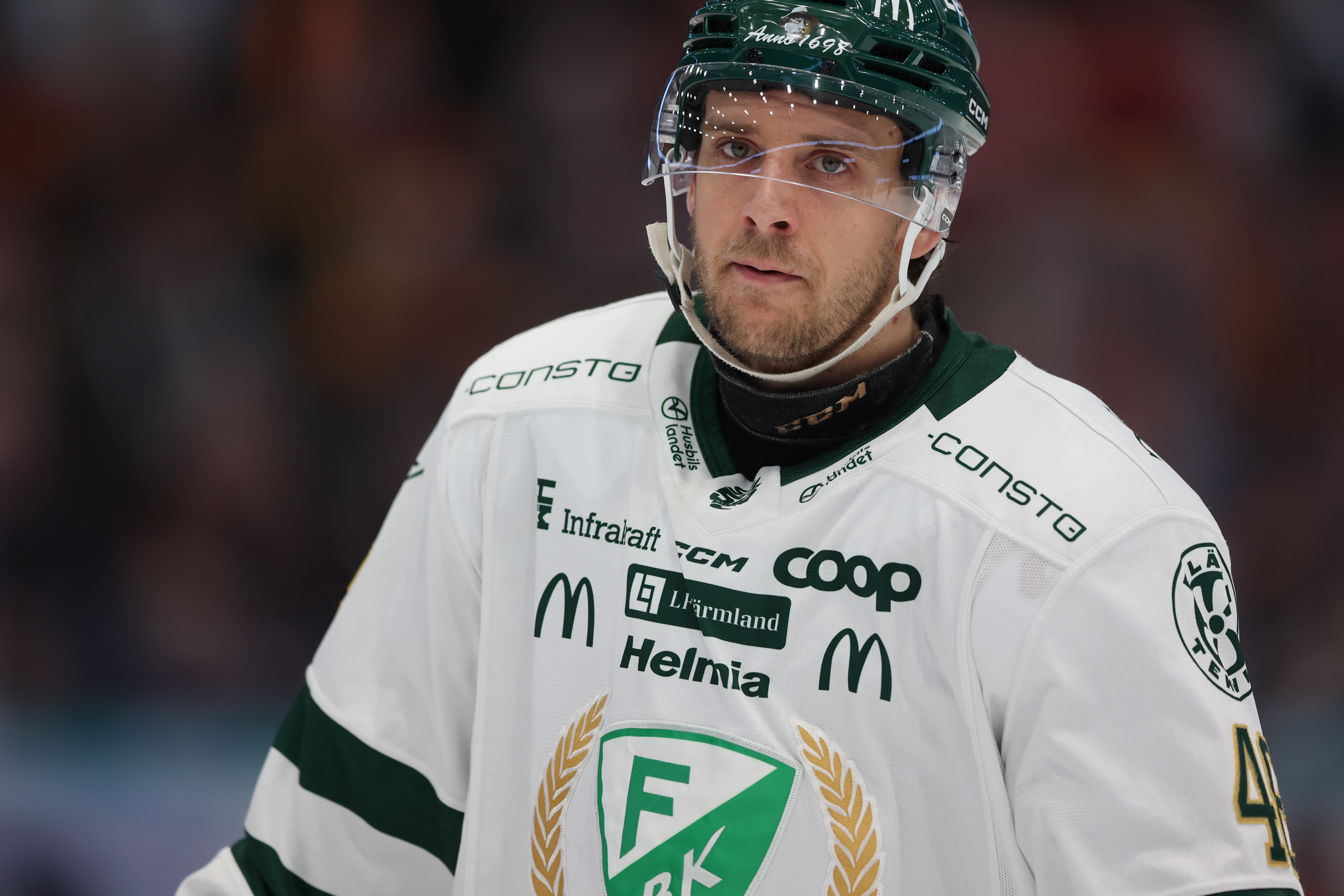
- Born: 5 January 1999 (age 27) Gothenburg, Sweden
- Height: 6 ft 4 in (193 cm)
- Weight: 190 lb (86 kg; 13 st 8 lb)
- Position: Defense
- Shoots: Left
- SHL team Former teams: Färjestad BK; Frölunda HC; Skellefteå AIK; Chicago Blackhawks
- NHL draft: Undrafted
- Playing career: 2017–present

Filip Roos (born 5 January 1999) is a Swedish professional ice hockey defenceman currently playing for the Färjestad BK of the Swedish Hockey League (SHL). He previously played for Frölunda HC and Skellefteå AIK of the SHL and the Chicago Blackhawks of the National Hockey League.

== Playing career ==
=== Sweden ===
Roos as a youth originally played with Hanhals IF and IF Troja-Ljungby before making his Swedish Hockey League (SHL) debut in the 2018–19 season with Frölunda HC. After two seasons in the HockeyAllsvenskan with BIK Karlskoga, leading the blueline in scoring with 28 points in 2020–21, Roos was signed to a two-year contract in returning to the SHL with Skellefteå AIK on 4 May 2021.

In his first full season in the SHL in 2021–22, Roos registered 6 points through 50 games with Skellefteå. He also added an assist in six postseason games with the club. Showing strong skating abilities for his size, Roos used an out-clause in his contract in leaving the SHL and signing as an undrafted free agent to a two-year, entry-level contract with the Chicago Blackhawks of the National Hockey League (NHL) on 23 May 2022.

=== North America ===
After attending his first training camp and pre-season with the Blackhawks, Roos remained on the 2022–23 season opening roster. He made his NHL debut in the opening night defeat to the Colorado Avalanche on 13 October 2022. He registered his first NHL point assisting on Jonathan Toews second period goal in a 4–3 overtime loss to the Minnesota Wild on 30 October. On 12 November, Roos scored his first NHL goal on goaltender Anthony Stolarz in the second period of a 3–2 victory over the Anaheim Ducks. He played in 15 games with the Blackhawks, scoring one goal and three points before he was assigned to Chicago's American Hockey League (AHL) affiliate, the Rockford IceHogs on 12 December. He spent the majority of the season with Rockford, playing in 39 games, scoring 3 goals and 11 points. He was recalled by the Blackhawks on 9 March 2023 appearing in two more games with the senior team.

Roos was assigned to Rockford to start the 2023–24 season. He played in 59 games with the IceHogs, scoring 2 goals and 16 points. He was recalled by Chicago on 16 November after defenseman Nikita Zaitsev became unavailable. He did not play with the team before being returned to Rockford on 19 November. He was recalled again on 5 December after defenseman Jarred Tinordi was injured. Roos made his NHL season debut on 12 December in a 4–1 loss to the Edmonton Oilers. He went to the locker room for part of the game after being struck in the hand by a puck. He played in four games going scoreless with Chicago before being sent back to Rockford along with defenseman Wyatt Kaiser on 22 December.

Following two seasons with the Blackhawks, Roos left as an unrestricted free agent and was signed to a one-year, two-way contract with the Ottawa Senators for the 2024–25 season on 2 July 2024. He was assigned to Ottawa's AHL affiliate, the Belleville Senators, to start the 2024–25 season. He played the entire season in the AHL, appearing in 68 games with Belleville, recording 17 points (all assists).

Färjestad BK of the SHL announced on 12 May 2025 that Roos signed a two-year deal with them, returning to Sweden. In his first season with Färjestad, he made 52 appearances, scoring eight goals and 19 points. The team qualified for the playoffs where they were eliminated by Rögle BK in the quarterfinals. In seven playoff games, Roos tallied three assists.

== Career statistics ==
			Regular season					Playoffs
Season	Team	League	GP	G	A	Pts	PIM	GP	G	A	Pts	PIM
2015–16	IF Troja-Ljungby	J20	18	1	2	3	4	5	0	2	2	0
2016–17	IF Troja-Ljungby	J20	26	4	14	18	8	2	0	0	0	0
2016–17	IF Troja-Ljungby	Div.1	6	0	0	0	0	—	—	—	—	—
2017–18	Frölunda HC	J20	43	5	7	12	10	5	0	3	3	2
2018–19	Frölunda HC	J20	32	3	15	18	10	6	0	0	0	0
2018–19	Frölunda HC	SHL	1	0	0	0	0	—	—	—	—	—
2018–19	Hanhals IF	Div.1	24	6	5	11	2	2	0	1	1	0
2019–20	BIK Karlskoga	Allsv	46	1	11	12	12	1	0	0	0	0
2020–21	BIK Karlskoga	Allsv	52	6	22	28	24	2	0	0	0	0
2021–22	Skellefteå AIK	SHL	50	1	5	6	8	6	0	1	1	2
2022–23	Chicago Blackhawks	NHL	17	1	2	3	4	—	—	—	—	—
2022–23	Rockford IceHogs	AHL	39	3	8	11	20	5	0	1	1	4
2023–24	Rockford IceHogs	AHL	59	2	14	16	20	4	0	3	3	2
2023–24	Chicago Blackhawks	NHL	4	0	0	0	0	—	—	—	—	—
2024–25	Belleville Senators	AHL	68	0	17	17	42	—	—	—	—	—
SHL totals			51	1	5	6	8	6	0	1	1	2
NHL totals			21	1	2	3	4	—	—	—	—	—
