= Nathan Clurman =

American ice hockey player (born 1998)

- Born: May 8, 1998 (age 28) Boulder, Colorado, U.S.
- Height: 6 ft 2 in (188 cm)
- Weight: 205 lb (93 kg; 14 st 9 lb)
- Position: Defense
- Shoots: Right
- SHL team Former teams: Rögle BK; Pittsburgh Penguins
- NHL draft: 161st overall, 2016; Colorado Avalanche
- Playing career: 2021–present

Nathaniel Hart Clurman (born May 8, 1998) is an American professional ice hockey defenseman for Rögle BK of the Swedish Hockey League (SHL). He was selected in the sixth round, 161st overall, by the Colorado Avalanche in the 2016 NHL entry draft and has previously played for the Pittsburgh Penguins.

== Playing career ==
Clurman played high school hockey with the Culver Military Academy before he was selected by homestate club, the Colorado Avalanche in the sixth round, 161st overall, of the 2016 NHL entry draft. Continuing his development in the United States Hockey League (USHL), Clurman appeared with the Tri-City Storm, Des Moines Buccaneers and the Sioux City Musketeers.

Clurman was recruited and committed to play collegiate hockey at Notre Dame beginning in 2018. Collectively, Clurman tallied seven points in 27 games for Notre Dame serving as team captain in his junior year and helped the Irish to their fifth straight NCAA Tournament appearance. In April 2021, Clurman concluded his collegiate career and was signed to a two-year, entry-level contract with draft team the Colorado Avalanche.

On July 1, 2024, Clurman as an unrestricted free agent signed a one-year, two-way contract with the Pittsburgh Penguins. During the 2024–25 season, on December 29, 2024, he made his NHL debut with the Pittsburgh Penguins in a regular season game against the New York Islanders.

As a free agent from the Penguins, on July 1, 2025, Clurman agreed to a one-year, two-way contract with the Montreal Canadiens for the 2025–26 season.

At the conclusion of his contract with the Canadiens, as a pending free agent, Clurman signed his first contract abroad in agreeing to a one-year deal with Swedish top tier club, Rögle BK of the SHL, on June 12, 2026.

== Career statistics ==
			Regular season					Playoffs
Season	Team	League	GP	G	A	Pts	PIM	GP	G	A	Pts	PIM
2015–16	Culver Academy	USHS	48	9	34	43	49	—	—	—	—	—
2016–17	Culver Academy	USHS	36	8	24	32	6	—	—	—	—	—
2016–17	Tri-City Storm	USHL	2	0	0	0	2	—	—	—	—	—
2017–18	Tri-City Storm	USHL	23	0	3	3	21	—	—	—	—	—
2017–18	Des Moines Buccaneers	USHL	15	1	2	3	2	—	—	—	—	—
2017–18	Sioux City Musketeers	USHL	19	0	7	7	4	—	—	—	—	—
2018–19	Notre Dame	B1G	39	0	3	3	8	—	—	—	—	—
2019–20	Notre Dame	B1G	37	0	9	9	10	—	—	—	—	—
2020–21	Notre Dame	B1G	27	4	3	7	31	—	—	—	—	—
2020–21	Colorado Eagles	AHL	9	0	0	0	10	—	—	—	—	—
2021–22	Utah Grizzlies	ECHL	54	3	21	24	28	18	1	2	3	8
2021–22	Colorado Eagles	AHL	7	1	0	1	2	—	—	—	—	—
2022–23	Utah Grizzlies	ECHL	8	0	3	3	2	—	—	—	—	—
2022–23	Colorado Eagles	AHL	57	3	12	15	32	5	0	0	0	4
2023–24	Colorado Eagles	AHL	37	1	4	5	21	—	—	—	—	—
2024–25	Wilkes-Barre/Scranton Penguins	AHL	31	2	9	11	20	1	0	0	0	2
2024–25	Pittsburgh Penguins	NHL	1	0	0	0	2	—	—	—	—	—
2025–26	Laval Rocket	AHL	60	1	10	11	22	—	—	—	—	—
NHL totals			1	0	0	0	2	—	—	—	—	—
