= List of 2024–25 NHL Three Star Awards =

The 2024–25 NHL Three Star Awards are the way the National Hockey League denotes its players of the week and players of the month of the 2024–25 season.

== Weekly ==
Weekly
Week	First Star	Second Star	Third Star
October 13, 2024	Dylan Guenther (Utah Hockey Club)	Connor Hellebuyck (Winnipeg Jets)	Jack Eichel (Vegas Golden Knights)
October 20, 2024	Sam Reinhart (Florida Panthers)	Artemi Panarin (New York Rangers)	Filip Gustavsson (Minnesota Wild)
October 27, 2024	Mark Stone (Vegas Golden Knights)	Juuse Saros (Nashville Predators)	Matt Duchene (Dallas Stars)
November 3, 2024	Alexander Ovechkin (Washington Capitals)	Martin Necas (Carolina Hurricanes)	Sidney Crosby (Pittsburgh Penguins)
November 10, 2024	Connor Hellebuyck (Winnipeg Jets)	Nathan MacKinnon (Colorado Avalanche)	Ukko-Pekka Luukkonen (Buffalo Sabres)
November 17, 2024	Connor McDavid (Edmonton Oilers)	Mason Marchment (Dallas Stars)	Andrei Vasilevskiy (Tampa Bay Lightning)
November 24, 2024	Zach Werenski (Columbus Blue Jackets)	Mikko Rantanen (Colorado Avalanche)	Joseph Woll (Toronto Maple Leafs)
December 1, 2024	Macklin Celebrini (San Jose Sharks)	Quinn Hughes (Vancouver Canucks)	Jakob Chychrun (Washington Capitals)
December 8, 2024	Matthew Tkachuk (Florida Panthers)	Brayden Point (Tampa Bay Lightning)	Adin Hill (Vegas Golden Knights)
December 15, 2024	Leon Draisaitl (Edmonton Oilers)	Nathan MacKinnon (Colorado Avalanche)	Linus Ullmark (Ottawa Senators)
December 22, 2024	Cale Makar (Colorado Avalanche)	William Nylander (Toronto Maple Leafs)	Patrik Laine (Montreal Canadiens)
December 29, 2024	Mark Scheifele (Winnipeg Jets)	Rasmus Dahlin (Buffalo Sabres)	Zach Werenski (Columbus Blue Jackets)
January 5, 2025	Marco Rossi (Minnesota Wild)	Troy Terry (Anaheim Ducks)	Darcy Kuemper (Los Angeles Kings)
January 12, 2025	Connor Hellebuyck (Winnipeg Jets)	Jordan Staal (Carolina Hurricanes)	Patrick Kane (Detroit Red Wings)
January 19, 2025	Logan Thompson (Washington Capitals)	Filip Forsberg (Nashville Predators)	David Pastrnak (Boston Bruins)
January 26, 2025	David Pastrnak (Boston Bruins)	Mason McTavish (Anaheim Ducks)	Barrett Hayton (Utah Hockey Club)
February 2, 2025	Ilya Sorokin (New York Islanders)	Tage Thompson (Buffalo Sabres)	Jake Sanderson (Ottawa Senators)
February 9, 2025	Brandon Hagel (Tampa Bay Lightning)	Thatcher Demko (Vancouver Canucks)	Matthew Tkachuk (Florida Panthers)
March 2, 2025	Andrei Vasilevskiy (Tampa Bay Lightning)	Roope Hintz (Dallas Stars)	Nick Suzuki (Montreal Canadiens)
March 9, 2025	Nathan MacKinnon (Colorado Avalanche)	Steven Stamkos (Nashville Predators)	Tom Wilson (Washington Capitals)
March 16, 2025	Darcy Kuemper (Los Angeles Kings)	Jesper Bratt (New Jersey Devils)	Brandon Montour (Seattle Kraken)
March 23, 2025	Filip Gustavsson (Minnesota Wild)	Jack Eichel (Vegas Golden Knights)	Dylan Holloway (St. Louis Blues)
March 30, 2025	Nikita Kucherov (Tampa Bay Lightning)	Roope Hintz (Dallas Stars)	Connor Hellebuyck (Winnipeg Jets)
April 6, 2025	Alexander Ovechkin (Washington Capitals)	Nick Suzuki (Montreal Canadiens)	Robert Thomas (St. Louis Blues)
April 13, 2025	Jet Greaves (Columbus Blue Jackets)	Connor McDavid (Edmonton Oilers)	Connor Hellebuyck (Winnipeg Jets)

== Monthly ==
Monthly
Month	First Star	Second Star	Third Star
October	Cale Makar (Colorado Avalanche)	Kyle Connor (Winnipeg Jets)	Kirill Kaprizov (Minnesota Wild)
November	Martin Necas (Carolina Hurricanes)	Mikko Rantanen (Colorado Avalanche)	Connor Hellebuyck (Winnipeg Jets)
December	Nathan MacKinnon (Colorado Avalanche)	Leon Draisaitl (Edmonton Oilers)	Jacob Markstrom (New Jersey Devils)
January	David Pastrnak (Boston Bruins)	Logan Thompson (Washington Capitals)	Zach Werenski (Columbus Blue Jackets)
February	Nathan MacKinnon (Colorado Avalanche)	Brandon Hagel (Tampa Bay Lightning)	Leon Draisaitl (Edmonton Oilers)
March	Jack Eichel (Vegas Golden Knights)	John Tavares (Toronto Maple Leafs)	Jordan Binnington (St. Louis Blues)

== Rookie of the Month ==
Rookie of the Month
Month	Player
October	Matvei Michkov (Philadelphia Flyers)
November	Macklin Celebrini (San Jose Sharks)
December	Lane Hutson (Montreal Canadiens)
January	Dustin Wolf (Calgary Flames)
February	Matvei Michkov (Philadelphia Flyers)
March	Lane Hutson (Montreal Canadiens)
