= 2024–25 Edmonton Oilers season =

National Hockey League season

2024–25 Edmonton Oilers
- Western Conference champions
- Division: 3rd Pacific
- Conference: 6th Western
- 2024–25 record: 48–29–5
- Home record: 25–13–3
- Road record: 23–16–2
- Goals for: 259
- Goals against: 236

Team information
- General manager: Stan Bowman
- Coach: Kris Knoblauch
- Captain: Connor McDavid
- Alternate captains: Leon Draisaitl; Ryan Nugent-Hopkins; Darnell Nurse
- Arena: Rogers Place
- Average attendance: 18,347
- Minor league affiliates: Bakersfield Condors (AHL); Fort Wayne Komets (ECHL)

Team leaders
- Goals: Leon Draisaitl (52)
- Assists: Connor McDavid (74)
- Points: Leon Draisaitl (106)
- Penalty minutes: Darnell Nurse (72)
- Plus/minus: Leon Draisaitl (+32)
- Wins: Stuart Skinner (26)
- Goals against average: Calvin Pickard (2.71)

The 2024–25 Edmonton Oilers season was the 46th season for the National Hockey League (NHL) franchise that was established on June 22, 1979, and 53rd season for the organization overall, including their play in the World Hockey Association (WHA).

On April 11, 2025, the Oilers clinched their sixth consecutive playoff spot after a 4–2 win over the San Jose Sharks. For the first time since the 2018–19 season the Oilers did not finished in 2nd in the division.

In the playoffs, after starting the series down 0–2 against the Los Angeles Kings, the Oilers won four straight games to eliminate the Kings. The Oilers then dispatched the Vegas Golden Knights in five games in the second round. In a rematch of the previous year's Western Conference finals, the Oilers defeated the Dallas Stars in five games and made the 2025 Stanley Cup Final for a rematch against the Florida Panthers, who won in 2024. The Oilers once again lost the Stanley Cup Final, this time in six games.

== Standings ==
=== Divisional standings ===
Pacific Division
Pos	Team	GP	W	L	OTL	RW	GF	GA	GD	Pts
1	y – Vegas Golden Knights	82	50	22	10	46	275	219	+56	110
2	x – Los Angeles Kings	82	48	25	9	43	250	206	+44	105
3	x – Edmonton Oilers	82	48	29	5	36	259	236	+23	101
4	Calgary Flames	82	41	27	14	31	225	238	−13	96
5	Vancouver Canucks	82	38	30	14	28	236	253	−17	90
6	Anaheim Ducks	82	35	37	10	24	221	263	−42	80
7	Seattle Kraken	82	35	41	6	28	247	265	−18	76
8	San Jose Sharks	82	20	50	12	14	210	315	−105	52

Source: National Hockey League
Rules for classification: 1) Fewer number of games played (GP, only during regular season); 2) Greater number of regulation wins (RW); 3) Greater number of wins in regulation and overtime, excluding shootout wins (ROW); 4) Greater number of total wins, including shootouts (W); 5) Greater number of points earned in head-to-head play; if teams played an uneven number of head-to-head games, the result of the first game on the home ice of the team with the extra home game is discarded; 6) Greater goal differential (GD); 7) Greater number of goals scored (GF)
x – Clinched playoff spot; y – Clinched division

=== Conference standings ===
Western Conference Wild Card
Pos	Div	Team	GP	W	L	OTL	RW	GF	GA	GD	Pts
1	CE	x – Minnesota Wild	82	45	30	7	33	228	239	−11	97
2	CE	x – St. Louis Blues	82	44	30	8	32	254	233	+21	96
3	PA	Calgary Flames	82	41	27	14	31	225	238	−13	96
4	PA	Vancouver Canucks	82	38	30	14	28	236	253	−17	90
5	CE	Utah Hockey Club	82	38	31	13	30	241	251	−10	89
6	PA	Anaheim Ducks	82	35	37	10	24	221	263	−42	80
7	PA	Seattle Kraken	82	35	41	6	28	247	265	−18	76
8	CE	Nashville Predators	82	30	44	8	24	214	274	−60	68
9	CE	Chicago Blackhawks	82	25	46	11	20	226	296	−70	61
10	PA	San Jose Sharks	82	20	50	12	14	210	315	−105	52

Source: National Hockey League
Rules for classification: 1) Fewer number of games played (GP, only during regular season); 2) Greater number of regulation wins (RW); 3) Greater number of wins in regulation and overtime, excluding shootout wins (ROW); 4) Greater number of total wins, including shootouts (W); 5) Greater number of points earned in head-to-head play; if teams played an uneven number of head-to-head games, the result of the first game on the home ice of the team with the extra home game is discarded; 6) Greater goal differential (GD); 7) Greater number of goals scored (GF)
x – Clinched playoff spot

== Schedule and results ==
=== Young Stars tournament ===
As with previous years, the Oilers took part in the annual Young Stars Classic, for its 11th edition, once again held in Penticton. The tournament took place from September 13 through 16, 2024.

2024 Young Stars tournament game log: 0–3–0
#	Date	Visitor	Score	Home	OT	Decision	Attendance	Record	Recap
1	September 13	Edmonton	0–2	Vancouver		Day		0–1–0
2	September 14	Edmonton	1–3	Calgary		Ungar		0–2–0
3	September 16	Edmonton	0–2	Winnipeg		Brochu		0–3–0
Notes: Games played at the South Okanagan Events Centre in Penticton, British Columbia.

=== Preseason ===
The preseason schedule was published on June 21, 2024.

2024 preseason game log: 3–5–0 (Home: 3–2–0; Road: 0–3–0)
#	Date	Visitor	Score	Home	OT	Decision	Attendance	Record	Recap
1	September 22	Winnipeg	2–3	Edmonton	OT	Delia	13,133	1–0–0
2	September 23	Edmonton	6–3	Calgary		Pickard	13,000	1–1–0
3	September 23	Calgary	1–6	Edmonton		Rodrigue	14,500	1–2–0
4	September 25	Edmonton	1–6	Winnipeg		Skinner	12,367	1–3–0
5	September 28	Seattle	4–5	Edmonton		Rodrigue	14,962	2–3–0
6	September 30	Vancouver	2–3	Edmonton	SO	Skinner	13,998	3–3–0
7	October 2	Edmonton	2–6	Seattle		Rodrigue	17,151	3–4–0
8	October 4	Edmonton	1–4	Vancouver		Skinner	18,850	3–5–0

=== Regular season ===
The Edmonton Oilers regular season schedule was released on July 2, 2024.

2024–25 game log

October: 5–5–1 (Home: 2–3–1; Road: 3–2–0)
#	Date	Visitor	Score	Home	OT	Decision	Attendance	Record	Points	Recap
1	October 9	Winnipeg	6–0	Edmonton		Skinner	18,347	0–1–0	0
2	October 12	Chicago	5–2	Edmonton		Pickard	18,347	0–2–0	0
3	October 13	Calgary	4–1	Edmonton		Skinner	18,347	0–3–0	0
4	October 15	Philadelphia	3–4	Edmonton	OT	Skinner	18,347	1–3–0	2
5	October 17	Edmonton	4–2	Nashville		Pickard	17,159	2–3–0	4
6	October 19	Edmonton	1–4	Dallas		Skinner	18,532	2–4–0	4
7	October 22	Carolina	3–2	Edmonton	OT	Skinner	18,347	2–4–1	5
8	October 25	Pittsburgh	0–4	Edmonton		Skinner	18,347	3–4–1	7
9	October 27	Edmonton	3–2	Detroit	OT	Pickard	19,515	4–4–1	9
10	October 28	Edmonton	1–6	Columbus		Skinner	15,227	4–5–1	9
11	October 31	Edmonton	5–1	Nashville		Pickard	17,159	5–5–1	11

November: 8–4–1 (Home: 3–3–0; Road: 5–1–1)
#	Date	Visitor	Score	Home	OT	Decision	Attendance	Record	Points	Recap
12	November 3	Edmonton	4–2	Calgary		Skinner	19,289	6–5–1	13
13	November 4	New Jersey	3–0	Edmonton		Pickard	18,347	6–6–1	13
14	November 6	Vegas	4–2	Edmonton		Skinner	18,347	6–7–1	13
15	November 9	Edmonton	7–3	Vancouver		Skinner	18,714	7–7–1	15
16	November 12	NY Islanders	3–4	Edmonton	OT	Skinner	18,347	8–7–1	17
17	November 14	Nashville	2–3	Edmonton	OT	Pickard	18,347	9–7–1	19
18	November 16	Edmonton	3–4	Toronto	OT	Skinner	19,301	9–7–2	20
19	November 18	Edmonton	0–3	Montreal		Pickard	21,105	9–8–2	20
20	November 19	Edmonton	5–2	Ottawa		Skinner	18,676	10–8–2	22
21	November 21	Minnesota	5–3	Edmonton		Skinner	18,347	10–9–2	22
22	November 23	NY Rangers	2–6	Edmonton		Skinner	18,347	11–9–2	24
23	November 29	Edmonton	4–3	Utah	OT	Pickard	11,131	12–9–2	26
24	November 30	Edmonton	4–1	Colorado		Skinner	18,080	13–9–2	28

December: 9–3–1 (Home: 8–1–0; Road: 1–2–1)
#	Date	Visitor	Score	Home	OT	Decision	Attendance	Record	Points	Recap
25	December 3	Edmonton	0–1	Vegas		Skinner	17,887	13–10–2	28
26	December 5	Columbus	3–6	Edmonton		Pickard	18,347	14–10–2	30
27	December 7	St. Louis	2–4	Edmonton		Skinner	18,347	15–10–2	32
28	December 10	Tampa Bay	1–2	Edmonton		Skinner	18,347	16–10–2	34
29	December 12	Edmonton	7–1	Minnesota		Pickard	18,394	17–10–2	36
30	December 14	Vegas	3–6	Edmonton		Skinner	18,347	18–10–2	38
31	December 16	Florida	6–5	Edmonton		Skinner	18,347	18–11–2	38
32	December 19	Boston	2–3	Edmonton	OT	Skinner	18,347	19–11–2	40
33	December 21	San Jose	2–3	Edmonton	OT	Pickard	18,347	20–11–2	42
34	December 22	Ottawa	1–3	Edmonton		Skinner	18,347	21–11–2	44
35	December 28	Edmonton	3–4	Los Angeles	OT	Skinner	18,145	21–11–3	45
36	December 29	Edmonton	3–5	Anaheim		Pickard	16,010	21–12–3	45
37	December 31	Utah	1–4	Edmonton		Skinner	18,347	22–12–3	47

January: 10–3–1 (Home: 5–1–1; Road: 5–2–0)
#	Date	Visitor	Score	Home	OT	Decision	Attendance	Record	Points	Recap
38	January 3	Anaheim	2–3	Edmonton		Skinner	18,347	23–12–3	49
39	January 4	Edmonton	4–2	Seattle		Pickard	17,151	24–12–3	51
40	January 7	Edmonton	4–0	Boston		Skinner	17,850	25–12–3	53
41	January 9	Edmonton	3–5	Pittsburgh		Skinner	17,004	25–13–3	53
42	January 11	Edmonton	4–3	Chicago		Pickard	19,387	26–13–3	55
43	January 13	Los Angeles	0–1	Edmonton		Skinner	18,347	27–13–3	57
44	January 15	Edmonton	5–3	Minnesota		Pickard	18,212	28–13–3	59
45	January 16	Edmonton	4–3	Colorado		Skinner	18,054	29–13–3	61
46	January 18	Edmonton	2–3	Vancouver		Skinner	18,965	29–14–3	61
47	January 21	Washington	3–2	Edmonton		Skinner	18,347	29–15–3	61
48	January 23	Vancouver	2–6	Edmonton		Pickard	18,347	30–15–3	63
49	January 25	Buffalo	2–3	Edmonton		Skinner	18,347	31–15–3	65
50	January 27	Seattle	2–4	Edmonton		Pickard	18,347	32–15–3	67
51	January 30	Detroit	3–2	Edmonton	SO	Skinner	18,347	32–15–4	68

February: 2–6–0 (Home: 0–2–0; Road: 2–4–0)
#	Date	Visitor	Score	Home	OT	Decision	Attendance	Record	Points	Recap
52	February 1	Toronto	4–3	Edmonton		Skinner	18,347	32–16–4	68
53	February 4	Edmonton	3–2	St. Louis	OT	Skinner	17,485	33–16–4	70
54	February 5	Edmonton	4–3	Chicago	OT	Pickard	17,103	34–16–4	72
55	February 7	Colorado	5–4	Edmonton		Pickard	18,347	34–17–4	72
56	February 22	Edmonton	3–6	Philadelphia		Skinner	19,847	34–18–4	72
57	February 23	Edmonton	3–7	Washington		Pickard	18,573	34–19–4	72
58	February 25	Edmonton	1–4	Tampa Bay		Skinner	19,092	34–20–4	72
59	February 27	Edmonton	3–4	Florida		Skinner	19,456	34–21–4	72

March: 8–5–1 (Home: 5–2–1; Road: 3–3–0)
#	Date	Visitor	Score	Home	OT	Decision	Attendance	Record	Points	Recap
60	March 1	Edmonton	3–1	Carolina		Pickard	18,994	35–21–4	74
61	March 4	Anaheim	6–2	Edmonton		Pickard	18,347	35–22–4	74
62	March 6	Montreal	2–3	Edmonton	OT	Skinner	18,347	36–22–4	76
63	March 8	Dallas	4–5	Edmonton		Skinner	18,347	37–22–4	78
64	March 10	Edmonton	2–3	Buffalo		Skinner	18,263	37–23–4	78
65	March 13	Edmonton	2–3	New Jersey		Skinner	16,514	37–24–4	78
66	March 14	Edmonton	2–1	NY Islanders	OT	Pickard	15,879	38–24–4	80
67	March 16	Edmonton	3–1	NY Rangers		Skinner	18,006	39–24–4	82
68	March 18	Utah	1–7	Edmonton		Pickard	18,347	40–24–4	84
69	March 20	Winnipeg	4–3	Edmonton	OT	Pickard	18,347	40–24–5	85
70	March 22	Seattle	4–5	Edmonton		Skinner	18,347	41–24–5	87
71	March 26	Dallas	4–3	Edmonton		Skinner	18,347	41–25–5	87
72	March 27	Edmonton	1–6	Seattle		Pickard	17,151	41–26–5	87
73	March 29	Calgary	2–3	Edmonton	OT	Pickard	18,347	42–26–5	89

April: 6–3–0 (Home: 2–1–0; Road: 4–2–0)
#	Date	Visitor	Score	Home	OT	Decision	Attendance	Record	Points	Recap
74	April 1	Edmonton	3–2	Vegas		Pickard	18,335	43–26–5	91
75	April 3	Edmonton	3–2	San Jose		Pickard	14,152	44–26–5	93
76	April 5	Edmonton	0–3	Los Angeles		Pickard	16,366	44–27–5	93
77	April 7	Edmonton	2–3	Anaheim		Rodrigue	14,128	44–28–5	93
78	April 9	St. Louis	3–4	Edmonton		Pickard	18,347	45–28–5	95
79	April 11	San Jose	2–4	Edmonton		Pickard	18,347	46–28–5	97
80	April 13	Edmonton	4–1	Winnipeg		Skinner	15,225	47–28–5	99
81	April 14	Los Angeles	5–0	Edmonton		Pickard	18,347	47–29–5	99
82	April 16	Edmonton	3–0	San Jose		Skinner	17,435	48–29–5	101

Legend: Win (2 points) Loss (0 points) Overtime/shootout loss (1 point)

=== Playoffs ===
2025 Stanley Cup Playoffs

Western Conference first round vs. (P2) Los Angeles Kings: Edmonton won 4–2
#	Date	Visitor	Score	Home	OT	Decision	Attendance	Series	Recap
1	April 21	Edmonton	5–6	Los Angeles		Skinner	18,145	0–1
2	April 23	Edmonton	2–6	Los Angeles		Skinner	18,145	0–2
3	April 25	Los Angeles	4–7	Edmonton		Pickard	18,347	1–2
4	April 27	Los Angeles	3–4	Edmonton	OT	Pickard	18,347	2–2
5	April 29	Edmonton	3–1	Los Angeles		Pickard	18,145	3–2
6	May 1	Los Angeles	4–6	Edmonton		Pickard	18,347	4–2

Western Conference second round vs. (P1) Vegas Golden Knights: Edmonton won 4–1
#	Date	Visitor	Score	Home	OT	Decision	Attendance	Series	Recap
1	May 6	Edmonton	4–2	Vegas		Pickard	18,111	1–0
2	May 8	Edmonton	5–4	Vegas	OT	Pickard	18,415	2–0
3	May 10	Vegas	4–3	Edmonton		Skinner	18,347	2–1
4	May 12	Vegas	0–3	Edmonton		Skinner	18,347	3–1
5	May 14	Edmonton	1–0	Vegas	OT	Skinner	18,288	4–1

Western Conference final vs. (C2) Dallas Stars: Edmonton won 4–1
#	Date	Visitor	Score	Home	OT	Decision	Attendance	Series	Recap
1	May 21	Edmonton	3–6	Dallas		Skinner	18,532	0–1
2	May 23	Edmonton	3–0	Dallas		Skinner	18,532	1–1
3	May 25	Dallas	1–6	Edmonton		Skinner	18,347	2–1
4	May 27	Dallas	1–4	Edmonton		Skinner	18,347	3–1
5	May 29	Edmonton	6–3	Dallas		Skinner	18,532	4–1

Stanley Cup Final vs. (A3) Florida Panthers: Florida won 4–2
#	Date	Visitor	Score	Home	OT	Decision	Attendance	Series	Recap
1	June 4	Florida	3–4	Edmonton	OT	Skinner	18,347	1–0
2	June 6	Florida	5–4	Edmonton	2OT	Skinner	18,347	1–1
3	June 9	Edmonton	1–6	Florida		Skinner	19,863	1–2
4	June 12	Edmonton	5–4	Florida	OT	Pickard	19,994	2–2
5	June 14	Florida	5–2	Edmonton		Pickard	18,347	2–3
6	June 17	Edmonton	1–5	Florida		Skinner	19,983	2–4

Legend: Win Loss

== Player statistics ==
=== Skaters ===
Regular season
Player	GP	G	A	Pts	+/−	PIM
Leon Draisaitl	71	52	54	106	+32	34
Connor McDavid	67	26	74	100	+20	37
Evan Bouchard	82	14	53	67	+14	32
Ryan Nugent-Hopkins	78	20	29	49	+4	24
Zach Hyman	73	27	17	44	+9	32
Mattias Ekholm	65	9	24	33	+11	30
Darnell Nurse	76	5	28	33	+11	72
Corey Perry	81	19	11	30	+12	61
Connor Brown	82	13	17	30	+9	10
Jeff Skinner	72	16	13	29	+1	26
Viktor Arvidsson	67	15	12	27	–3	24
Adam Henrique	81	12	15	27	+2	16
Brett Kulak	82	7	18	25	–7	18
Vasily Podkolzin	82	8	16	24	+1	48
Mattias Janmark	80	2	16	18	–6	22
Kasperi Kapanen^{†}	57	5	8	13	–16	14
Ty Emberson	76	2	11	13	–5	18
Jake Walman^{†}	15	1	7	8	+5	6
Troy Stecher	66	3	4	7	–2	27
Derek Ryan	36	1	5	6	–4	12
John Klingberg	11	1	3	4	0	8
Max Jones^{†}	19	1	1	2	–9	10
Noah Philp	15	0	2	2	+1	2
Joshua Brown	10	0	1	1	–2	11
Drake Caggiula	7	0	1	1	0	5
Matt Savoie	4	0	1	1	–4	0
Travis Dermott^{‡†}	10	0	0	0	–3	2
Cam Dineen	4	0	0	0	0	0
Trent Frederic^{†}	1	0	0	0	–2	0
Quinn Hutson	2	0	0	0	0	2

Playoffs
Player	GP	G	A	Pts	+/−	PIM
Leon Draisaitl	22	11	22	33	+4	6
Connor McDavid	22	7	26	33	+3	4
Evan Bouchard	22	7	16	23	+6	8
Ryan Nugent-Hopkins	22	6	14	20	+4	6
Corey Perry	22	10	4	14	–2	12
Evander Kane	21	6	6	12	+4	44
Zach Hyman	15	5	6	11	+10	6
Vasily Podkolzin	22	3	7	10	+7	20
Jake Walman	22	2	8	10	+9	12
Connor Brown	20	5	4	9	+1	2
Darnell Nurse	22	3	5	8	+2	31
Adam Henrique	22	4	3	7	+4	4
Viktor Arvidsson	15	2	5	7	+3	6
Kasperi Kapanen	12	3	3	6	+4	18
Mattias Ekholm	7	1	5	6	0	14
Brett Kulak	22	1	4	5	+9	8
Mattias Janmark	22	3	1	4	+5	14
John Klingberg	19	1	3	4	+3	2
Trent Frederic	22	1	3	4	+1	25
Jeff Skinner	5	1	1	2	–1	0
Joshua Brown	1	0	0	0	+1	0
Troy Stecher	8	0	0	0	+2	2
Ty Emberson	9	0	0	0	+1	0

=== Goaltenders ===
Regular season
Player	GP	GS	TOI	W	L	OT	GA	GAA	SA	SV%	SO	G	A	PIM
Stuart Skinner	51	50	2,942:27	26	18	4	138	2.81	1,325	.896	3	0	0	0
Calvin Pickard	36	31	1,881:43	22	10	1	85	2.71	849	.900	0	0	1	0
Olivier Rodrigue	2	1	77:25	0	1	0	4	3.10	29	.862	0	0	0	0

Playoffs
Player	GP	GS	TOI	W	L	GA	GAA	SA	SV%	SO	G	A	PIM
Calvin Pickard	10	7	526:09	7	1	25	2.85	219	.886	0	0	0	0
Stuart Skinner	15	15	881:29	7	7	44	2.99	398	.889	3	0	0	2

^{†}Denotes player spent time with another team before joining the Oilers. Stats reflect time with the Oilers only.
^{‡}Denotes player was traded mid-season. Stats reflect time with the Oilers only.

== Awards and honours ==
=== Awards ===
Player	Award	Awarded	Ref.
Connor McDavid	NHL 1st Star of the Week (Nov. 11 – Nov. 17)	November 18, 2024	
Leon Draisaitl	NHL 1st Star of the Week (Dec. 9 – Dec. 15)	December 16, 2024	
Leon Draisaitl	NHL 2nd Star of the Month (December)	January 1, 2025	
Leon Draisaitl	NHL 3rd Star of the Month (February)	March 1, 2025	
Connor McDavid	NHL 2nd Star of the Week (Apr. 7 – Apr. 13)	April 14, 2025	

=== Milestones ===
Regular season
Player	Milestone	Reached
Brett Kulak	500th NHL game	October 12, 2024
Ryan Nugent-Hopkins	700th NHL point	October 12, 2024
Troy Stecher	500th NHL game	October 25, 2024
Zach Hyman	400th NHL point	October 25, 2024
Stuart Skinner	5th NHL shutout	October 25, 2024
Noah Philp	1st NHL game 1st NHL assist 1st NHL point	October 31, 2024
Mattias Janmark	200th NHL point	November 9, 2024
Zach Hyman	200th NHL assist	November 9, 2024
Connor McDavid	1,000th NHL point	November 14, 2024
Ryan Nugent-Hopkins	900th NHL game	November 18, 2024
Zach Hyman	600th NHL game	November 19, 2024
Darnell Nurse	200th NHL assist	December 12, 2024
Connor Brown	100th NHL goal	December 16, 2024
Leon Draisaitl	900th NHL point	December 19, 2024
Derek Ryan	600th NHL game	December 22, 2024
Evan Bouchard	300th NHL game	December 28, 2024
Evan Bouchard	200th NHL point	January 3, 2025
Mattias Janmark	600th NHL game	January 13, 2025
Stuart Skinner	6th NHL shutout	January 13, 2025
Kasperi Kapanen	500th NHL game	February 4, 2025
Matt Savoie	1st NHL assist 1st NHL point	February 22, 2025
Connor McDavid	700th NHL assist	March 1, 2025
Connor McDavid	700th NHL game	March 4, 2025
Vasily Podkolzin	200th NHL game	March 8, 2025
Darnell Nurse	700th NHL game	March 13, 2025
Viktor Arvidsson	600th NHL game	March 20, 2025
Ryan Nugent-Hopkins	4th NHL hat-trick	March 22, 2025
Olivier Rodrigue	1st NHL game	March 27, 2025
Ty Emberson	100th NHL game	April 5, 2025
Darnell Nurse	300th NHL point	April 11, 2025
Connor Brown	600th NHL game	April 14, 2025
Quinn Hutson	1st NHL game	April 14, 2025
Joshua Brown	300th NHL game	April 16, 2025
Stuart Skinner	7th NHL shutout	April 16, 2025

Playoffs
Player	Milestone	Reached
Ty Emberson	1st NHL playoff game	April 21, 2025
Jeff Skinner	1st NHL playoff game 1st NHL playoff assist 1st NHL playoff point	April 21, 2025
Vasily Podkolzin	1st NHL playoff assist 1st NHL playoff point	April 23, 2025
Jake Walman	1st NHL playoff assist 1st NHL playoff point	April 25, 2025
Jake Walman	1st NHL playoff goal	May 8, 2025
Vasily Podkolzin	1st NHL playoff goal	May 8, 2025
Mattias Janmark	100th NHL playoff game	May 10, 2025
Stuart Skinner	2nd NHL playoff shutout	May 12, 2025
Stuart Skinner	3rd NHL playoff shutout	May 14, 2025
Stuart Skinner	4th NHL playoff shutout	May 23, 2025
Zach Hyman	100th NHL playoff game	May 27, 2025
Connor McDavid	100th NHL playoff assist	May 29, 2025
Jeff Skinner	1st NHL playoff goal	May 29, 2025

== Transactions ==
The Oilers have been involved in the following transactions during the 2024–25 season.

Key:

† Contract is entry-level.
‡ Contract initially takes effect in the 2025–26 season.

=== Trades ===
Date	Details		Ref
June 28, 2024	To Philadelphia Flyers conditional 1st-round pick in 2025 or 2026	To Edmonton Oilers FLA 1st-round pick in 2024	
July 5, 2024	To Buffalo Sabres Ryan McLeod; Tyler Tullio	To Edmonton Oilers Matt Savoie	
July 15, 2024	To Ottawa Senators Xavier Bourgault; Jake Chiasson	To Edmonton Oilers Roby Jarventie; 4th-round pick in 2025	
August 18, 2024	To San Jose Sharks Cody Ceci; 3rd-round pick in 2025	To Edmonton Oilers Ty Emberson	
August 18, 2024	To Vancouver Canucks OTT 4th-round pick in 2025	To Edmonton Oilers Vasily Podkolzin	
August 20, 2024	To St. Louis Blues Future considerations	To Edmonton Oilers Paul Fischer; 3rd-round pick in 2028	
November 4, 2024	To Philadelphia Flyers Ben Gleason	To Edmonton Oilers Ronnie Attard	
December 6, 2024	To Montreal Canadiens Noel Hoefenmayer	To Edmonton Oilers Jacob Perreault	
March 4, 2025	To New Jersey Devils Shane Lachance	To Edmonton Oilers Trent Frederic	
March 4, 2025	To Boston Bruins Max Wanner; STL 2nd-round pick in 2025; 4th-round pick in 2026	To Edmonton Oilers Petr Hauser; Max Jones	
March 6, 2025	To San Jose Sharks Carl Berglund conditional 1st-round pick in 2026 or 2027	To Edmonton Oilers Jake Walman	
June 25, 2025	To Vancouver Canucks Evander Kane	To Edmonton Oilers OTT 4th-round pick in 2025	

=== Players acquired ===
Date	Player	Former team	Term	Via	Ref
July 1, 2024	Viktor Arvidsson	Los Angeles Kings	2-year	Free agency	
July 1, 2024	Joshua Brown	Arizona Coyotes	3-year	Free agency	
July 1, 2024	Connor Carrick	Seattle Kraken	1-year	Free agency	
July 1, 2024	Collin Delia	Winnipeg Jets	1-year	Free agency	
July 1, 2024	Jeff Skinner	Buffalo Sabres	1-year	Free agency	
October 7, 2024	Cameron Wright	Bakersfield Condors (AHL)	1-year	Free agency	
October 8, 2024	Travis Dermott	Arizona Coyotes	1-year	Free agency	
October 9, 2024	Raphael Lavoie	Vegas Golden Knights		Waivers	
November 19, 2024	Kasperi Kapanen	St. Louis Blues		Waivers	
December 11, 2024	Alec Regula	Boston Bruins		Waivers	
January 17, 2025	John Klingberg	Toronto Maple Leafs	1-year	Free agency	
February 26, 2025	Travis Dermott	Minnesota Wild		Waivers	
March 31, 2025	Damien Carfagna	Ohio State University (B1G)	2-year†‡	Free agency	
April 2, 2025	Josh Samanski	Straubing Tigers (DEL)	2-year†‡	Free agency	
April 2, 2025	David Tomasek	Farjestad BK (SHL)	1-year†‡	Free agency	
April 13, 2025	Atro Leppanen	Vaasan Sport (Liiga)	1-year†‡	Free agency	
April 14, 2025	Quinn Hutson	Boston University (HE)	2-year†	Free agency	
June 7, 2025	Viljami Marjala	HC TPS (Liiga)	2-year†‡	Free agency	

=== Players lost ===
Date	Player	New team	Term	Via	Ref
July 1, 2024	Jack Campbell	Detroit Red Wings	1-year	Free agency	
July 1, 2024	Sam Carrick	New York Rangers	3-year	Free agency	
July 1, 2024	Vincent Desharnais	Vancouver Canucks	2-year	Free agency	
July 1, 2024	Warren Foegele	Los Angeles Kings	3-year	Free agency	
July 2, 2024	Ryan Fanti	Syracuse Crunch (AHL)	1-year	Free agency	
July 26, 2024	Carter Savoie	TPS (Liiga)	1-year	Free agency	
August 20, 2024	Philip Broberg	St. Louis Blues	2-year	Offer sheet	
August 20, 2024	Dylan Holloway	St. Louis Blues	2-year	Offer sheet	
September 12, 2024	Markus Niemelainen	Eisbaren Berlin (DEL)	1-year	Free agency	
September 25, 2024	Greg McKegg	BK Mlada Boleslav (ELH)	1-year	Free agency	
October 7, 2024	Raphael Lavoie	Vegas Golden Knights		Waivers	
October 11, 2024	Raphael Lavoie	Vegas Golden Knights		Waivers	
December 13, 2024	Travis Dermott	Minnesota Wild		Waivers	
May 6, 2025	Roby Jarventie	Tappara (Liiga)	3-year	Free agency	
May 8, 2025	Connor Carrick	HC Lugano (NL)	2-year	Free agency	
June 1, 2025	Drake Caggiula	Lausanne HC (NL)	1-year	Free agency	

=== Signings ===
Date	Player	Term	Ref
July 1, 2024	Connor Brown	1-year	
July 1, 2024	James Hamblin	2-year	
July 1, 2024	Adam Henrique	2-year	
July 1, 2024	Noel Hoefenmayer	1-year	
July 1, 2024	Mattias Janmark	3-year	
July 1, 2024	Corey Perry	1-year	
July 1, 2024	Noah Philp	1-year	
July 1, 2024	Troy Stecher	2-year	
July 8, 2024	Raphael Lavoie	1-year	
September 3, 2024	Leon Draisaitl	8-year‡	
October 21, 2024	Sam O'Reilly	3-year†	
December 23, 2024	Connor Clattenburg	3-year†	
April 5, 2025	Nathaniel Day	3-year†‡	
April 12, 2025	Samuel Jonsson	3-year†‡	
April 19, 2025	Ty Emberson	2-year‡	
May 2, 2025	Alec Regula	2-year‡	
June 3, 2025	Roby Jarventie	1-year‡	

== Draft picks ==
Below are the Edmonton Oilers' selections at the 2024 NHL entry draft, which were held on June 28 to 29, 2024. It was held at the Sphere in Paradise, Nevada.

Round	#	Player	Pos	Nationality	College/Junior/Club team (League)
1	32	Sam O'Reilly	RW	Canada	London Knights (OHL)
2	64	Eemil Vinni	G	Finland	Kiekko-Pojat (Mestis)
5	160	Connor Clattenburg	LW	Canada	Flint Firebirds (OHL)
6	183	Albin Sundin	D	Sweden	Frölunda HC (J20 Nationell)
6	192	Dalyn Wakely	C	Canada	North Bay Battalion (OHL)
7	196	William Nicholl	C	Canada	London Knights (OHL)
7	218	Bauer Berry	D	United States	Muskegon Lumberjacks (USHL)
