= 2024–25 Vegas Golden Knights season =

National Hockey League season

2024–25 Vegas Golden Knights
- Pacific Division champions
- Division: 1st Pacific
- Conference: 2nd Western
- 2024–25 record: 50–22–10
- Home record: 29–9–3
- Road record: 21–13–7
- Goals for: 275
- Goals against: 219

Team information
- General manager: Kelly McCrimmon
- Coach: Bruce Cassidy
- Captain: Mark Stone
- Alternate captains: Jack Eichel; William Karlsson; Alex Pietrangelo
- Arena: T-Mobile Arena
- Average attendance: 17,975
- Minor league affiliates: Henderson Silver Knights (AHL); Tahoe Knight Monsters (ECHL)

Team leaders
- Goals: Pavel Dorofeyev (35)
- Assists: Jack Eichel (66)
- Points: Jack Eichel (94)
- Penalty minutes: Keegan Kolesar (53)
- Plus/minus: Brayden McNabb (+42)
- Wins: Adin Hill (32)
- Goals against average: Akira Schmid (1.26)

The 2024–25 Vegas Golden Knights season was the eighth season for the National Hockey League (NHL) franchise that started playing in the 2017–18 season.

On April 1, 2025, the Golden Knights clinched a playoff berth for the seventh time in eight seasons, following the Calgary Flames' loss in regulation to the Utah Hockey Club. Subsequently, on April 12, the Golden Knights clinched their fourth Pacific Division championship after defeating the Nashville Predators 5–3 in regulation. The Golden Knights defeated the Minnesota Wild in the first round in six games before losing to the Edmonton Oilers in the second round in five games.

== Standings ==
=== Divisional standings ===
Pacific Division
Pos	Team	GP	W	L	OTL	RW	GF	GA	GD	Pts
1	y – Vegas Golden Knights	82	50	22	10	46	275	219	+56	110
2	x – Los Angeles Kings	82	48	25	9	43	250	206	+44	105
3	x – Edmonton Oilers	82	48	29	5	36	259	236	+23	101
4	Calgary Flames	82	41	27	14	31	225	238	−13	96
5	Vancouver Canucks	82	38	30	14	28	236	253	−17	90
6	Anaheim Ducks	82	35	37	10	24	221	263	−42	80
7	Seattle Kraken	82	35	41	6	28	247	265	−18	76
8	San Jose Sharks	82	20	50	12	14	210	315	−105	52

Source: National Hockey League
Rules for classification: 1) Fewer number of games played (GP, only during regular season); 2) Greater number of regulation wins (RW); 3) Greater number of wins in regulation and overtime, excluding shootout wins (ROW); 4) Greater number of total wins, including shootouts (W); 5) Greater number of points earned in head-to-head play; if teams played an uneven number of head-to-head games, the result of the first game on the home ice of the team with the extra home game is discarded; 6) Greater goal differential (GD); 7) Greater number of goals scored (GF)
x – Clinched playoff spot; y – Clinched division

=== Conference standings ===
Western Conference Wild Card
Pos	Div	Team	GP	W	L	OTL	RW	GF	GA	GD	Pts
1	CE	x – Minnesota Wild	82	45	30	7	33	228	239	−11	97
2	CE	x – St. Louis Blues	82	44	30	8	32	254	233	+21	96
3	PA	Calgary Flames	82	41	27	14	31	225	238	−13	96
4	PA	Vancouver Canucks	82	38	30	14	28	236	253	−17	90
5	CE	Utah Hockey Club	82	38	31	13	30	241	251	−10	89
6	PA	Anaheim Ducks	82	35	37	10	24	221	263	−42	80
7	PA	Seattle Kraken	82	35	41	6	28	247	265	−18	76
8	CE	Nashville Predators	82	30	44	8	24	214	274	−60	68
9	CE	Chicago Blackhawks	82	25	46	11	20	226	296	−70	61
10	PA	San Jose Sharks	82	20	50	12	14	210	315	−105	52

Source: National Hockey League
Rules for classification: 1) Fewer number of games played (GP, only during regular season); 2) Greater number of regulation wins (RW); 3) Greater number of wins in regulation and overtime, excluding shootout wins (ROW); 4) Greater number of total wins, including shootouts (W); 5) Greater number of points earned in head-to-head play; if teams played an uneven number of head-to-head games, the result of the first game on the home ice of the team with the extra home game is discarded; 6) Greater goal differential (GD); 7) Greater number of goals scored (GF)
x – Clinched playoff spot

== Schedule and results ==
=== Preseason ===
The 2024 preseason schedule was published on June 20, 2024.

2024 preseason game log: 3–3–0 (home: 1–3–0; road: 2–0–0)
#	Date	Visitor	Score	Home	OT	Decision	Attendance	Record	Recap
1	September 22	Vegas	4–2	San Jose		Saville	9,049	1–0–0
2	September 25	Los Angeles	3–2	Vegas		Samsonov	17,488	1–1–0
3	September 27	Utah	2–5	Vegas		Hill	17,561	2–1–0
4	October 1	Vegas	6–1	Colorado		Schmid	15,729	3–1–0
5	October 3	Colorado	3–1	Vegas		Samsonov	17,419	3–2–0
6	October 5	San Jose	6–5	Vegas		Hill	17,590	3–3–0

=== Regular season ===
The regular season schedule was published on July 2, 2024.

2024–25 game log

October: 7–3–1 (home: 7–0–0; road: 0–3–1)
#	Date	Visitor	Score	Home	OT	Decision	Attendance	Record	Pts	Recap
1	October 9	Colorado	4–8	Vegas		Hill	18,388	1–0–0	2
2	October 11	St. Louis	3–4	Vegas		Hill	17,861	2–0–0	4
3	October 13	Anaheim	1–3	Vegas		Samsonov	18,027	3–0–0	6
4	October 15	Vegas	2–4	Washington		Hill	16,727	3–1–0	6
5	October 17	Vegas	3–4	Tampa Bay		Hill	19,092	3–2–0	6
6	October 19	Vegas	3–4	Florida	OT	Samsonov	19,572	3–2–1	7
7	October 22	Los Angeles	1–6	Vegas		Samsonov	17,767	4–2–1	9
8	October 25	Ottawa	4–6	Vegas		Hill	17,564	5–2–1	11
9	October 26	San Jose	3–7	Vegas		Samsonov	17,686	6–2–1	13
10	October 28	Calgary	0–5	Vegas		Hill	17,599	7–2–1	15
11	October 30	Vegas	3–6	Los Angeles		Samsonov	15,007	7–3–1	15

November: 8–4–2 (home: 2–3–0; road: 6–1–2)
#	Date	Visitor	Score	Home	OT	Decision	Attendance	Record	Pts	Recap
12	November 2	Utah	3–4	Vegas	OT	Hill	18,216	8–3–1	17
13	November 6	Vegas	4–2	Edmonton		Hill	18,347	9–3–1	19
14	November 8	Vegas	3–4	Seattle	OT	Hill	17,151	9–3–2	20
15	November 11	Carolina	5–2	Vegas		Hill	17,908	9–4–2	20
16	November 13	Vegas	3–2	Anaheim		Hill	13,153	10–4–2	22
17	November 15	Vegas	4–2	Utah		Hill	11,131	11–4–2	24
18	November 17	Washington	5–2	Vegas		Samsonov	17,877	11–5–2	24
19	November 20	Vegas	0–3	Toronto		Hill	18,853	11–6–2	24
20	November 21	Vegas	3–2	Ottawa		Samsonov	16,822	12–6–2	26
21	November 23	Vegas	6–2	Montreal		Hill	21,105	13–6–2	28
22	November 25	Vegas	5–4	Philadelphia	SO	Samsonov	18,050	14–6–2	30
23	November 27	Vegas	1–2	Colorado	SO	Hill	18,078	14–6–3	31
24	November 29	Winnipeg	3–4	Vegas		Hill	18,044	15–6–3	33
25	November 30	Utah	6–0	Vegas		Samsonov	17,666	15–7–3	33

December: 10–2–0 (home: 6–1–0; road: 4–1–0)
#	Date	Visitor	Score	Home	OT	Decision	Attendance	Record	Pts	Recap
26	December 3	Edmonton	0–1	Vegas		Hill	17,887	16–7–3	35
27	December 4	Vegas	4–1	Anaheim		Samsonov	13,188	17–7–3	37
28	December 6	Dallas	2–3	Vegas		Hill	17,961	18–7–3	39
29	December 12	Vegas	3–2	Winnipeg	OT	Hill	13,320	19–7–3	41
30	December 14	Vegas	3–6	Edmonton		Hill	18,347	19–8–3	41
31	December 15	Vegas	3–2	Minnesota		Samsonov	18,771	20–8–3	43
32	December 19	Vancouver	1–3	Vegas		Hill	17,779	21–8–3	45
33	December 21	Seattle	2–6	Vegas		Samsonov	17,862	22–8–3	47
34	December 23	Anaheim	1–3	Vegas		Hill	18,009	23–8–3	49
35	December 27	Vegas	6–3	San Jose		Hill	17,435	24–8–3	51
36	December 29	Calgary	0–3	Vegas		Samsonov	18,269	25–8–3	53
37	December 31	Montreal	3–2	Vegas		Hill	17,925	25–9–3	53

January: 6–6–3 (home: 4–2–3; road: 2–4–0)
#	Date	Visitor	Score	Home	OT	Decision	Attendance	Record	Pts	Recap
38	January 2	Philadelphia	2–5	Vegas		Samsonov	17,909	26–9–3	55
39	January 4	Buffalo	1–3	Vegas		Hill	18,111	27–9–3	57
40	January 7	Vegas	4–2	San Jose		Samsonov	10,802	28–9–3	59
41	January 9	NY Islanders	4–0	Vegas		Hill	17,713	28–10–3	59
42	January 11	NY Rangers	2–1	Vegas		Samsonov	18,144	28–11–3	59
43	January 12	Minnesota	1–4	Vegas		Hill	17,921	29–11–3	61
44	January 14	Vegas	3–5	Nashville		Samsonov	17,159	29–12–3	61
45	January 17	Vegas	2–3	Carolina		Hill	18,825	29–13–3	61
46	January 18	Vegas	3–5	Chicago		Samsonov	19,340	29–14–3	61
47	January 20	St. Louis	5–4	Vegas	SO	Hill	17,879	29–14–4	62
48	January 23	Vegas	4–2	St. Louis		Samsonov	17,430	30–14–4	64
49	January 24	Vegas	3–4	Dallas		Hill	18,532	30–15–4	64
50	January 26	Florida	1–4	Vegas		Hill	17,716	31–15–4	66
51	January 28	Dallas	4–3	Vegas	OT	Hill	17,811	31–15–5	67
52	January 30	Columbus	2–1	Vegas	OT	Samsonov	17,783	31–15–6	68

February: 4–3–0 (home: 2–0–0; road: 2–3–0)
#	Date	Visitor	Score	Home	OT	Decision	Attendance	Record	Pts	Recap
53	February 2	Vegas	2–4	NY Rangers		Hill	18,006	31–16–6	68
54	February 4	Vegas	1–2	NY Islanders		Samsonov	16,031	31–17–6	68
55	February 6	Vegas	3–1	New Jersey		Hill	16,514	32–17–6	70
56	February 8	Vegas	4–3	Boston		Samsonov	17,850	33–17–6	72
57	February 22	Vancouver	1–3	Vegas		Hill	18,309	34–17–6	74
58	February 24	Vegas	2–5	Los Angeles		Samsonov	18,145	34–18–6	74
59	February 27	Chicago	5–7	Vegas		Samsonov	18,290	35–18–6	76

March: 10–2–2 (home: 6–1–0; road: 4–1–2)
#	Date	Visitor	Score	Home	OT	Decision	Attendance	Record	Pts	Recap
60	March 2	New Jersey	0–2	Vegas		Hill	17,941	36–18–6	78
61	March 5	Toronto	2–5	Vegas		Hill	17,769	37–18–6	80
62	March 7	Pittsburgh	0–4	Vegas		Samsonov	18,219	38–18–6	82
63	March 9	Los Angeles	6–5	Vegas		Hill	18,019	38–19–6	82
64	March 11	Vegas	2–3	Pittsburgh	OT	Samsonov	15,760	38–19–7	83
65	March 13	Vegas	4–0	Columbus		Hill	18,823	39–19–7	85
66	March 15	Vegas	3–4	Buffalo	SO	Hill	16,770	39–19–8	86
67	March 16	Vegas	0–3	Detroit		Samsonov	19,515	39–20–8	86
68	March 20	Boston	1–5	Vegas		Hill	18,225	40–20–8	88
69	March 22	Detroit	3–6	Vegas		Hill	18,348	41–20–8	90
70	March 23	Tampa Bay	2–4	Vegas		Samsonov	17,906	42–20–8	92
71	March 25	Vegas	5–1	Minnesota		Hill	17,734	43–20–8	94
72	March 28	Vegas	5–3	Chicago		Hill	19,121	44–20–8	96
73	March 29	Vegas	3–1	Nashville		Hill	17,159	45–20–8	98

April: 5–2–2 (home: 2–2–0; road: 3–0–2)
#	Date	Visitor	Score	Home	OT	Decision	Attendance	Record	Pts	Recap
74	April 1	Edmonton	3–2	Vegas		Hill	18,335	45–21–8	98
75	April 3	Winnipeg	4–0	Vegas		Hill	18,022	45–22–8	98
76	April 5	Vegas	3–2	Calgary	OT	Schmid	18,104	46–22–8	100
77	April 6	Vegas	3–2	Vancouver		Hill	18,807	47–22–8	102
78	April 8	Vegas	2–3	Colorado	SO	Schmid	18,077	47–22–9	103
79	April 10	Seattle	1–2	Vegas		Hill	17,971	48–22–9	105
80	April 12	Nashville	3–5	Vegas		Hill	18,338	49–22–9	107
81	April 15	Vegas	4–5	Calgary	SO	Samsonov	19,055	49–22–10	108
82	April 16	Vegas	4–1	Vancouver		Schmid	18,942	50–22–10	110

Legend: Win (2 points) Loss (0 points) Overtime/shootout loss (1 point)

=== Playoffs ===
2025 Stanley Cup playoffs

Western Conference first round vs. (WC1) Minnesota Wild: Vegas won 4–2
#	Date	Visitor	Score	Home	OT	Decision	Attendance	Series	Recap
1	April 20	Minnesota	2–4	Vegas		Hill	18,016	1–0
2	April 22	Minnesota	5–2	Vegas		Hill	18,311	1–1
3	April 24	Vegas	2–5	Minnesota		Hill	19,058	1–2
4	April 26	Vegas	4–3	Minnesota	OT	Hill	19,324	2–2
5	April 29	Minnesota	2–3	Vegas	OT	Hill	18,441	3–2
6	May 1	Vegas	3–2	Minnesota		Hill	19,047	4–2

Western Conference Second Round vs. (P3) Edmonton Oilers: Edmonton won 4–1
#	Date	Visitor	Score	Home	OT	Decision	Attendance	Series	Recap
1	May 6	Edmonton	4–2	Vegas		Hill	18,111	0–1
2	May 8	Edmonton	5–4	Vegas	OT	Hill	18,415	0–2
3	May 10	Vegas	4–3	Edmonton		Hill	18,347	1–2
4	May 12	Vegas	0–3	Edmonton		Hill	18,347	1–3
5	May 14	Edmonton	1–0	Vegas	OT	Hill	18,288	1–4

Legend: Win Loss

== Player statistics ==
Updated to games played May 14, 2025

=== Skaters ===
Regular season
Player	GP	G	A	Pts	+/−	PIM
Jack Eichel	76	28	**66**	**94**	+32	8
Mark Stone	66	19	48	67	+22	14
Tomas Hertl	73	32	29	61	–3	20
Shea Theodore	67	7	50	**57**	+19	26
Pavel Dorofeyev	82	35	17	52	+2	30
Ivan Barbashev	70	23	28	51	+26	10
Brett Howden	80	23	17	40	+17	46
Noah Hanifin	80	10	29	39	+8	14
Alex Pietrangelo	71	4	29	33	+11	16
Nicolas Roy	71	15	16	31	–4	43
Keegan Kolesar	82	12	18	30	+3	53
Victor Olofsson	56	15	14	29	+16	16
William Karlsson	53	9	20	29	+17	4
Tanner Pearson	78	12	15	27	+4	6
Brayden McNabb	82	5	15	20	+42	32
Brandon Saad^{†}	29	6	8	14	+6	0
Zach Whitecloud	74	4	9	13	+7	37
Nicolas Hague	68	5	7	12	–2	40
Alexander Holtz	53	4	8	12	–3	10
Reilly Smith^{†}	21	3	8	11	+11	2
Kaedan Korczak	40	0	10	10	+15	2
Cole Schwindt	42	1	7	8	+3	0
Ben Hutton	11	0	2	2	0	0
Callahan Burke	7	1	0	1	+2	2
Tanner Laczynski	8	1	0	1	–1	6
Grigori Denisenko^{‡}	1	0	0	0	0	2
Mason Morelli	1	0	0	0	–1	0
Robert Hagg	2	0	0	0	0	0
Brendan Brisson^{‡}	9	0	0	0	–3	0
Raphael Lavoie	9	0	0	0	–4	2
Jonas Rondbjerg	13	0	0	0	–4	0

Playoffs
Player	GP	G	A	Pts	+/−	PIM
Jack Eichel	11	1	9	10	–8	0
Mark Stone	10	4	4	8	–4	0
William Karlsson	11	3	3	6	+5	0
Alex Pietrangelo	10	2	4	6	+1	0
Tomas Hertl	11	3	2	5	–3	0
Shea Theodore	11	2	3	5	–9	0
Noah Hanifin	11	1	4	5	+1	2
Reilly Smith	11	3	1	4	+1	4
Victor Olofsson	9	2	2	4	–4	0
Nicolas Roy	11	2	2	4	–5	21
Brayden McNabb	11	0	4	4	–7	6
Brett Howden	11	3	0	3	–2	4
Pavel Dorofeyev	8	1	1	2	–7	2
Ivan Barbashev	11	1	1	2	–9	6
Brandon Saad	8	0	2	2	0	2
Nicolas Hague	11	0	2	2	–2	9
Zach Whitecloud	11	0	2	2	–3	8
Tanner Pearson	8	0	1	1	–2	0
Keegan Kolesar	11	0	1	1	–2	6
Kaedan Korczak	1	0	0	0	0	0
Cole Schwindt	1	0	0	0	0	0

=== Goaltenders ===
Regular season
Player	GP	GS	TOI	W	L	OT	GA	GAA	SA	SV%	SO	G	A	PIM
Adin Hill	50	50	2,940:13	32	13	5	121	2.47	1,293	.906	4	0	0	4
Ilya Samsonov	29	29	1,745:22	16	9	4	82	2.82	752	.891	2	0	1	4
Akira Schmid	5	3	238:06	2	0	1	5	1.26	90	.944	0	0	0	0

Playoffs
Player	GP	GS	TOI	W	L	GA	GAA	SA	SV%	SO	G	A	PIM
Adin Hill	11	11	676:30	5	6	33	2.93	292	.887	0	0	0	0
Akira Schmid	1	0	18:56	0	0	0	0.00	9	1.000	0	0	0	0

^{†}Denotes player spent time with another team before joining the Golden Knights. Stats reflect time with the Golden Knights only.
^{‡}Denotes player was traded or waived mid-season. Stats reflect time with the Golden Knights only.
Bold denotes new franchise record.

== Transactions ==
The Golden Knights have been involved in the following transactions during the 2024–25 season.

Key:

† Contract is entry-level.
‡ Contract initially takes effect in the 2025–26 season.

=== Trades ===
* Retained Salary Transaction: Each team is allowed up to three contracts on their payroll where they have retained salary in a trade (i.e. the player no longer plays with Team A due to a trade to Team B, but Team A still retains some salary). Only up to 50% of a player's contract can be kept, and only up to 15% of a team's salary cap can be taken up by retained salary. A contract can only be involved in one of these trades twice.

Date	Details		Ref
June 29, 2024	To Washington Capitals Logan Thompson	To Vegas Golden Knights NYI 3rd-round pick in 2024; 3rd-round pick in 2025	
June 29, 2024	To New Jersey Devils Paul Cotter; 3rd-round pick in 2025	To Vegas Golden Knights Alexander Holtz; Akira Schmid	
June 29, 2024	To Washington Capitals 7th-round pick in 2024	To Vegas Golden Knights 6th-round pick in 2025	
February 18, 2025	To Nashville Predators Grigori Denisenko	To Vegas Golden Knights Future considerations	
March 6, 2025	To New York Rangers Brendan Brisson; SJS 3rd-round pick in 2025	To Vegas Golden Knights Reilly Smith*	

=== Players acquired ===
Date	Player	Former team	Term	Via	Ref
July 1, 2024	Zach Aston-Reese	Detroit Red Wings	1-year	Free agency	
July 1, 2024	Tanner Laczynski	Philadelphia Flyers	2-year	Free agency	
July 1, 2024	Ilya Samsonov	Toronto Maple Leafs	1-year	Free agency	
July 2, 2024	Callahan Burke	Carolina Hurricanes	1-year	Free agency	
July 2, 2024	Robert Hagg	Anaheim Ducks	1-year	Free agency	
July 2, 2024	Victor Olofsson	Buffalo Sabres	1-year	Free agency	
September 23, 2024	Viliam Kmec	Prince George Cougars (WHL)	3-year†	Free agency	
October 4, 2024	Tanner Pearson	Montreal Canadiens	1-year	Free agency	
October 7, 2024	Raphael Lavoie	Edmonton Oilers		Waivers	
October 7, 2024	Cole Schwindt	Calgary Flames		Waivers	
October 11, 2024	Raphael Lavoie	Edmonton Oilers		Waivers	
January 31, 2025	Brandon Saad	St. Louis Blues	1-year	Free agency	
March 2, 2025	Braeden Bowman	Henderson Silver Knights (AHL)	2-year†‡	Free agency	
March 2, 2025	Kai Uchacz	Henderson Silver Knights (AHL)	2-year†‡	Free agency	
Legend: † Contract is entry-level. ‡ Contract begins in 2025–26 season.

=== Players lost ===
Date	Player	New team	Term	Via	Ref
July 1, 2024	Michael Amadio	Ottawa Senators	3-year	Free agency	
July 1, 2024	Anthony Mantha	Calgary Flames	1-year	Free agency	
July 1, 2024	Jonathan Marchessault	Nashville Predators	5-year	Free agency	
July 1, 2024	Alec Martinez	Chicago Blackhawks	1-year	Free agency	
July 1, 2024	Jiri Patera	Vancouver Canucks	2-year	Free agency	
July 1, 2024	Chandler Stephenson	Seattle Kraken	7-year	Free agency	
July 2, 2024	Sheldon Rempal	Salavat Yulaev Ufa (KHL)	1-year	Free agency	
July 3, 2024	William Carrier	Carolina Hurricanes	6-year	Free agency	
July 13, 2024	Byron Froese	Lokomotiv Yaroslavl (KHL)	1-year	Free agency	
July 23, 2024	Layton Ahac	Abbotsford Canucks (AHL)	1-year	Free agency	
September 28, 2024	Mason Primeau	Lehigh Valley Phantoms (AHL)	1-year	Free agency	
October 3, 2024	Robin Lehner			Termination settlement	
October 7, 2024	Zach Aston-Reese	Columbus Blue Jackets		Waivers	
October 9, 2024	Raphael Lavoie	Edmonton Oilers		Waivers	
December 3, 2024	Daniil Chayka			Mutual termination	
December 16, 2024	Daniil Chayka	Avangard Omsk (KHL)	2-year	Free agency	
May 28, 2025	Robert Hagg	Brynäs IF (SHL)	1-year‡	Free agency	
Legend: ‡ Contract begins in 2025–26 season.

=== Signings ===
Date	Player	Term	Ref
July 1, 2024	Pavel Dorofeyev	2-year	
July 1, 2024	Kaedan Korczak	2-year	
July 3, 2024	Akira Schmid	2-year	
October 24, 2024	Shea Theodore	7-year‡	
November 15, 2024	Brayden McNabb	3-year‡	
November 22, 2024	Brett Howden	5-year‡	
December 13, 2024	Keegan Kolesar	3-year‡	
March 1, 2025	Trent Swick	3-year†‡	
March 14, 2025	Adin Hill	6-year‡	
March 27, 2025	Cameron Whitehead	2-year†‡	
April 1, 2025	Trevor Connelly	3-year†‡	
April 2, 2025	Jackson Hallum	2-year†‡	
May 20, 2025	Tuomas Uronen	3-year†‡	
Legend: † Contract is entry-level. ‡ Contract begins in 2025–26 season.

== Draft picks ==
Below are the Vegas Golden Knights' selections at the 2024 NHL entry draft, which was held on June 28 to 29, 2022, at the Sphere in Las Vegas.

Round	#	Player	Pos.	Nationality	Team (League)
1	19	Trevor Connelly	LW	United States	Tri-City Storm (USHL)
3	83 (Note: The New York Islanders' third-round pick went to the Vegas Golden Knights as the result of a trade on June 29, 2024, that sent Logan Thompson to Washington in exchange for a third-round pick in 2025 and this pick.)	Pavel Moysevich	G	Belarus	SKA Saint Petersburg (KHL)
6	180	Trent Swick	LW	Canada	Kitchener Rangers (OHL)
7	197 (Note: The Columbus Blue Jackets' seventh-round pick went to the Golden Knights as the result of a trade on June 29, 2023, that sent a seventh-round pick in 2023 to Columbus in exchange for this pick.)	Lucas Van Vilet	RW	United States	U.S. NTDP (USHL)
