= Ty Emberson =

American ice hockey player (born 2000)

- Born: May 23, 2000 (age 26) Eau Claire, Wisconsin, U.S.
- Height: 6 ft 1 in (185 cm)
- Weight: 202 lb (92 kg; 14 st 6 lb)
- Position: Defense
- Shoots: Right
- NHL team Former teams: Edmonton Oilers; San Jose Sharks
- NHL draft: 73rd overall, 2018; Arizona Coyotes
- Playing career: 2021–present

Ty Emberson (born May 23, 2000) is an American professional ice hockey player who is a defenseman for the Edmonton Oilers of the National Hockey League (NHL).

== Playing career ==
Emberson was on the Wisconsin state ice hockey team as a youth and spent two years at Memorial High School in Eau Claire, where he totaled 49 points in 46 games. He then spent two years with the USA Hockey National Team Development Program and was a member of the under-17 and under-18 national teams; he scored 23 points in 59 games with the under-17 squad and 12 points in 36 games with the under-18 team.

Emberson was selected by the Arizona Coyotes with the 73rd overall pick of the 2018 NHL entry draft, but opted to go to college instead of start his professional career. He then enrolled at the University of Wisconsin–Madison and played for their Wisconsin Badgers ice hockey team, scoring 12 points in 37 games as a freshman. He was an alternate captain while scoring nine points in the 2019–20 season. He was named the Wisconsin Badgers team captain for the 2020–21 season and was named honorable mention All-Big Ten as well as to the Big Ten All-Tournament team, also being one of three finalists for the league defensive player of the year award. He totaled nine goals and 25 assists in his three-season stint with the Badgers.

In April 2021, Emberson signed a three-year, entry-level contract with the Coyotes and was sent to their American Hockey League (AHL) affiliate, the Tucson Roadrunners. He appeared in five games and scored one goal for them in his first season. In 2021–22, he appeared in 58 games and totaled four goals and seven assists.

Emberson was traded from the Coyotes to the New York Rangers on July 13, 2022, in exchange for Patrik Nemeth and two draft picks. He played with the Hartford Wolf Pack during the 2022–23 season and scored 27 points in 69 games, being second on the team among skaters in plus–minus and third in points and assists among defensemen. Emberson was named the AHL Eastern Conference Best Defensive Defenseman.

Emberson signed a one-year contract extension with the Rangers on July 13, 2023, but in September 2023 was waived and then claimed off waivers by the San Jose Sharks. After the training camp Emberson made the Sharks' opening roster for the 2023–24 season.

On July 11, 2024, Emberson signed a one-year contract extension to remain with the Sharks. Before commencing his contract with the Sharks, Emberson was traded to the Edmonton Oilers in exchange for Cody Ceci and a 2025 third-round pick on August 18, 2024. He recorded 13 points in 76 games during his first season with the Oilers. On April 19, 2025, the Oilers signed Emberson to a two-year, $2.6 million contract extension.

== International play ==
Medal record

Representing United States

World U18 Championships
Silver medal – second place	2018	Russia

In 2019, Emberson was selected to play for the United States junior team at the 2020 World Junior Ice Hockey Championships.

== Personal life ==
Emberson was born on May 23, 2000, in Eau Claire, Wisconsin to parents Missy and Mike. He has a brother, Andrew and a sister, Mia. His grandfather, Denny Zacho, was a two-sport athlete for the Minnesota Golden Gophers and was inducted into their Hall of Fame.

== Career statistics ==
=== Regular season and playoffs ===
			Regular season					Playoffs
Season	Team	League	GP	G	A	Pts	PIM	GP	G	A	Pts	PIM
2016–17	U.S. National Development Team	USHL	34	0	8	8	12	—	—	—	—	—
2017–18	U.S. National Development Team	USHL	25	4	11	15	0	—	—	—	—	—
2018–19	Wisconsin Badgers	B1G	37	4	8	12	10	—	—	—	—	—
2019–20	Wisconsin Badgers	B1G	33	1	8	9	53	—	—	—	—	—
2020–21	Wisconsin Badgers	B1G	31	4	9	13	6	—	—	—	—	—
2020–21	Tucson Roadrunners	AHL	5	1	0	1	0	1	0	0	0	0
2021–22	Tucson Roadrunners	AHL	58	4	7	11	17	—	—	—	—	—
2022–23	Hartford Wolf Pack	AHL	69	7	20	27	27	9	2	3	5	0
2023–24	San Jose Sharks	NHL	30	1	9	10	6	—	—	—	—	—
2024–25	Edmonton Oilers	NHL	76	2	11	13	18	9	0	0	0	0
2025–26	Edmonton Oilers	NHL	72	2	10	12	23	6	0	1	1	0
NHL totals			178	5	30	35	47	15	0	1	1	0

=== International play ===
Year	Team	Event	Result	GP	G	A	Pts	PIM
2016	United States	U17	5th	5	0	3	3	0
2018	United States	U18	2nd place, silver medalist(s)	7	0	4	4	12
2020	United States	WJC	6th	5	0	0	0	0
Junior totals				17	0	7	7	12
