= 2024–25 New York Islanders season =

National Hockey League season

2024–25 New York Islanders
- Division: 6th Metropolitan
- Conference: 12th Eastern
- 2024–25 record: 35–35–12
- Home record: 19–17–5
- Road record: 16–18–7
- Goals for: 224
- Goals against: 260

Team information
- General manager: Lou Lamoriello
- Coach: Patrick Roy
- Captain: Anders Lee
- Alternate captains: Bo Horvat; Brock Nelson (Oct. 10 – Mar. 6); Ryan Pulock (Mar. 6 – Apr. 17)
- Arena: UBS Arena
- Average attendance: 15,979
- Minor league affiliates: Bridgeport Islanders (AHL); Worcester Railers (ECHL)

Team leaders
- Goals: Anders Lee (29)
- Assists: Noah Dobson; Bo Horvat (29)
- Points: Bo Horvat (56)
- Penalty minutes: Casey Cizikas (47)
- Plus/minus: Scott Mayfield (+17)
- Wins: Ilya Sorokin (29)
- Goals against average: Ilya Sorokin (2.77)

The 2024–25 New York Islanders season was the 53rd season in the franchise's history. It was their fourth season in UBS Arena. It was their first full season under head coach Patrick Roy, who was the interim head coach for the 2023–24 season after the firing of Lane Lambert on January 20, 2024.

On April 12, 2025, the Islanders were eliminated from playoff contention for the first time since the 2021–22 season following their shootout loss to the Philadelphia Flyers.

== Standings ==
=== Divisional standings ===
Metropolitan Division
Pos	Team	GP	W	L	OTL	RW	GF	GA	GD	Pts
1	z – Washington Capitals	82	51	22	9	43	288	232	+56	111
2	x – Carolina Hurricanes	82	47	30	5	42	266	233	+33	99
3	x – New Jersey Devils	82	42	33	7	36	242	222	+20	91
4	Columbus Blue Jackets	82	40	33	9	30	273	268	+5	89
5	New York Rangers	82	39	36	7	35	256	255	+1	85
6	New York Islanders	82	35	35	12	28	224	260	−36	82
7	Pittsburgh Penguins	82	34	36	12	24	243	293	−50	80
8	Philadelphia Flyers	82	33	39	10	21	238	286	−48	76

Source: National Hockey League
Rules for classification: 1) Fewer number of games played (GP, only during regular season); 2) Greater number of regulation wins (RW); 3) Greater number of wins in regulation and overtime, excluding shootout wins (ROW); 4) Greater number of total wins, including shootouts (W); 5) Greater number of points earned in head-to-head play; if teams played an uneven number of head-to-head games, the result of the first game on the home ice of the team with the extra home game is discarded; 6) Greater goal differential (GD); 7) Greater number of goals scored (GF)
x – Clinched playoff spot; z – Clinched conference

=== Conference standings ===
Eastern Conference Wild Card
Pos	Div	Team	GP	W	L	OTL	RW	GF	GA	GD	Pts
1	AT	x – Ottawa Senators	82	45	30	7	35	243	234	+9	97
2	AT	x – Montreal Canadiens	82	40	31	11	30	245	265	−20	91
3	ME	Columbus Blue Jackets	82	40	33	9	30	273	268	+5	89
4	AT	Detroit Red Wings	82	39	35	8	30	238	259	−21	86
5	ME	New York Rangers	82	39	36	7	35	256	255	+1	85
6	ME	New York Islanders	82	35	35	12	28	224	260	−36	82
7	ME	Pittsburgh Penguins	82	34	36	12	24	243	293	−50	80
8	AT	Buffalo Sabres	82	36	39	7	29	269	289	−20	79
9	AT	Boston Bruins	82	33	39	10	26	222	272	−50	76
10	ME	Philadelphia Flyers	82	33	39	10	21	238	286	−48	76

Source: National Hockey League
Rules for classification: 1) Fewer number of games played (GP, only during regular season); 2) Greater number of regulation wins (RW); 3) Greater number of wins in regulation and overtime, excluding shootout wins (ROW); 4) Greater number of total wins, including shootouts (W); 5) Greater number of points earned in head-to-head play; if teams played an uneven number of head-to-head games, the result of the first game on the home ice of the team with the extra home game is discarded; 6) Greater goal differential (GD); 7) Greater number of goals scored (GF)
x – Clinched playoff spot

== Schedule and results ==
=== Preseason ===
The New York Islanders preseason schedule was released on June 17, 2024.

2024 preseason game log: 4–2–0 (Home: 3–0–0; Road: 1–2–0)

#	Date	Visitor	Score	Home	OT	Decision	Location	Attendance	Record
1	September 22	NY Islanders	4–2	New Jersey		Hogberg	Prudential Center	10,815	1–0–0
2	September 24	NY Islanders	4–6	NY Rangers		Tikkanen	Madison Square Garden	16,568	1–1–0
3	September 26	NY Islanders	0–2	Philadelphia		Hogberg	Wells Fargo Center	11,716	1–2–0
4	September 27	New Jersey	1–5	NY Islanders		Varlamov	UBS Arena	11,420	2–2–0
5	September 30	Philadelphia	3–4	NY Islanders		Skarek	UBS Arena	10,564	3–2–0
6	October 4	NY Rangers	2–5	NY Islanders		Varlamov	UBS Arena	16,106	4–2–0

Legend:

= Win = Loss = OT/SO Loss

=== Regular season ===
The regular season schedule was published on July 2, 2024.

2024–25 game log
October: 3–5–2 (home: 1–3–1; road: 2–2–1)

#	Date	Visitor	Score	Home	OT	Decision	Location	Attendance	Record	Points	Recap
1	October 10	Utah	5–4	NY Islanders	OT	Varlamov	UBS Arena	17,254	0–0–1	1	
2	October 12	NY Islanders	0–3	Dallas		Varlamov	American Airlines Center	18,532	0–1–1	1	
3	October 14	NY Islanders	6–2	Colorado		Sorokin	Ball Arena	18,017	1–1–1	3	
4	October 17	NY Islanders	0–1	St. Louis	OT	Sorokin	Enterprise Center	17,109	1–1–2	4	
5	October 19	Montreal	3–4	NY Islanders	SO	Varlamov	UBS Arena	15,411	2–1–2	6	
6	October 22	Detroit	1–0	NY Islanders		Sorokin	UBS Arena	12,739	2–2–2	6	
7	October 25	NY Islanders	4–3	New Jersey	OT	Sorokin	Prudential Center	14,870	3–2–2	8	
8	October 26	Florida	6–3	NY Islanders		Varlamov	UBS Arena	15,807	3–3–2	8	
9	October 29	Anaheim	3–1	NY Islanders		Sorokin	UBS Arena	14,234	3–4–2	8	
10	October 30	NY Islanders	0–2	Columbus		Varlamov	Nationwide Arena	14,015	3–5–2	8	

November: 6–5–4 (Home: 3–2–1; Road: 3–3–3)

#	Date	Visitor	Score	Home	OT	Decision	Location	Attendance	Record	Points	Recap
11	November 1	NY Islanders	4–3	Buffalo		Sorokin	KeyBank Center	17,074	4–5–2	10	
12	November 3	NY Islanders	2–5	NY Rangers		Sorokin	Madison Square Garden	18,006	4–6–2	10	
13	November 5	Pittsburgh	3–4	NY Islanders	SO	Sorokin	UBS Arena	14,025	5–6–2	12	
14	November 7	NY Islanders	4–2	Ottawa		Varlamov	Canadian Tire Centre	15,677	6–6–2	14	
15	November 9	New Jersey	4–3	NY Islanders	OT	Sorokin	UBS Arena	17,255	6–6–3	15	
16	November 12	NY Islanders	3–4	Edmonton	OT	Sorokin	Rogers Place	18,347	6–6–4	16	
17	November 14	NY Islanders	5–2	Vancouver		Varlamov	Rogers Arena	18,728	7–6–4	18	
18	November 16	NY Islanders	2–3	Seattle		Sorokin	Climate Pledge Arena	17,151	7–7–4	18	
19	November 19	NY Islanders	1–2	Calgary	SO	Varlamov	Scotiabank Saddledome	16,565	7–7–5	19	
20	November 21	NY Islanders	1–2	Detroit		Sorokin	Little Caesars Arena	19,013	7–8–5	19	
21	November 23	St. Louis	1–3	NY Islanders		Sorokin	UBS Arena	17,255	8–8–5	21	
22	November 25	Detroit	4–2	NY Islanders		Varlamov	UBS Arena	14,900	8–9–5	21	
23	November 27	Boston	6–3	NY Islanders		Sorokin	UBS Arena	16,145	8–10–5	21	
24	November 29	NY Islanders	4–5	Washington	OT	Varlamov	Capital One Arena	18,573	8–10–6	22	
25	November 30	Buffalo	0–3	NY Islanders		Sorokin	UBS Arena	16,299	9–10–6	24	

December: 5–6–1 (Home: 3–3–0; Road: 2–3–1)

#	Date	Visitor	Score	Home	OT	Decision	Location	Attendance	Record	Points	Recap
26	December 3	NY Islanders	1–2	Montreal	OT	Sorokin	Bell Centre	21,105	9–10–7	25	
27	December 5	Seattle	5–2	NY Islanders		Sorokin	UBS Arena	14,877	9–11–7	25	
28	December 7	Carolina	3–4	NY Islanders		Sorokin	UBS Arena	15,619	10–11–7	27	
29	December 8	NY Islanders	4–2	Ottawa		Sorokin	Canadian Tire Centre	15,878	11–11–7	29	
30	December 10	Los Angeles	3–1	NY Islanders		Sorokin	UBS Arena	15,402	11–12–7	29	
31	December 12	Chicago	4–5	NY Islanders		Sorokin	UBS Arena	16,170	12–12–7	31	
32	December 15	NY Islanders	3–5	Chicago		Sorokin	United Center	19,264	12–13–7	31	
33	December 17	NY Islanders	0–4	Carolina		Sorokin	Lenovo Center	18,700	12–14–7	31	
34	December 21	NY Islanders	6–3	Toronto		Sorokin	Scotiabank Arena	18,912	13–14–7	33	
35	December 23	Buffalo	7–1	NY Islanders		Sorokin	UBS Arena	17,255	13–15–7	33	
36	December 28	Pittsburgh	3–6	NY Islanders		Sorokin	UBS Arena	17,255	14–15–7	35	
37	December 29	NY Islanders	2–3	Pittsburgh		Hogberg	PPG Paints Arena	18,357	14–16–7	35	
38	December 31	NY Islanders	1–3	Toronto		Sorokin	Scotiabank Arena	18,933	14–17–7	35	

January: 9–3–0 (Home: 5–3–0; Road: 4–0–0)

#	Date	Visitor	Score	Home	OT	Decision	Location	Attendance	Record	Points	Recap
39	January 2	Toronto	2–1	NY Islanders		Sorokin	UBS Arena	17,255	14–18–7	35	
40	January 5	NY Islanders	5–4	Boston	OT	Sorokin	TD Garden	17,850	15–18–7	37	
41	January 9	NY Islanders	4–0	Vegas		Sorokin	T-Mobile Arena	17,713	16–18–7	39	
42	January 11	NY Islanders	2–1	Utah		Hogberg	Delta Center	11,131	17–18–7	41	
43	January 14	Ottawa	2–0	NY Islanders		Hogberg	UBS Arena	15,101	17–19–7	41	
44	January 16	Philadelphia	5–3	NY Islanders		Sorokin	UBS Arena	15,761	17–20–7	41	
45	January 18	San Jose	1–4	NY Islanders		Hogberg	UBS Arena	17,255	18–20–7	43	
46	January 20	Columbus	1–3	NY Islanders		Sorokin	UBS Arena	14,551	19–20–7	45	
47	January 24	Philadelphia	1–3	NY Islanders		Sorokin	UBS Arena	17,255	20–20–7	47	
48	January 25	Carolina	2–3	NY Islanders	OT	Sorokin	UBS Arena	17,255	21–20–7	49	
49	January 28	Colorado	2–5	NY Islanders		Sorokin	UBS Arena	15,735	22–20–7	51	
50	January 30	NY Islanders	3–0	Philadelphia		Sorokin	Wells Fargo Center	18,703	23–20–7	53	

February: 3–5–0 (Home: 1–2–0; Road: 2–3–0)

#	Date	Visitor	Score	Home	OT	Decision	Location	Attendance	Record	Points	Recap
51	February 1	NY Islanders	3–2	Tampa Bay	OT	Sorokin	Amalie Arena	19,092	24–20–7	55	
52	February 2	NY Islanders	3–6	Florida		Skarek	Amerant Bank Arena	19,721	24–21–7	55	
53	February 4	Vegas	1–2	NY Islanders		Sorokin	UBS Arena	16,031	25–21–7	57	
54	February 7	NY Islanders	3–4	Winnipeg		Sorokin	Canada Life Centre	14,685	25–22–7	57	
55	February 8	NY Islanders	3–6	Minnesota		Sorokin	Xcel Energy Center	18,539	25–23–7	57	
56	February 23	Dallas	4–3	NY Islanders		Sorokin	UBS Arena	16,602	25–24–7	57	
57	February 25	NY Rangers	5–1	NY Islanders		Sorokin	UBS Arena	17,255	25–25–7	57	
58	February 27	NY Islanders	2–1	Boston		Sorokin	TD Garden	17,850	26–25–7	59	

March: 6–5–3 (Home: 4–1–3; Road: 2–4–0)

#	Date	Visitor	Score	Home	OT	Decision	Location	Attendance	Record	Points	Recap
59	March 1	Nashville	4–7	NY Islanders		Sorokin	UBS Arena	17,255	27–25–7	61	
60	March 3	NY Islanders	0–4	NY Rangers		Sorokin	Madison Square Garden	17,475	27–26–7	61	
61	March 4	Winnipeg	2–3	NY Islanders		Sorokin	UBS Arena	14,723	28–26–7	63	
62	March 8	NY Islanders	4–2	San Jose		Sorokin	SAP Center	17,435	29–26–7	65	
63	March 9	NY Islanders	1–4	Anaheim		Hogberg	Honda Center	17,174	29–27–7	65	
64	March 11	NY Islanders	1–4	Los Angeles		Sorokin	Crypto.com Arena	15,394	29–28–7	65	
65	March 14	Edmonton	2–1	NY Islanders	OT	Sorokin	UBS Arena	15,879	29–28–8	66	
66	March 16	Florida	2–4	NY Islanders		Sorokin	UBS Arena	15,109	30–28–8	68	
67	March 18	NY Islanders	4–2	Pittsburgh		Sorokin	PPG Paints Arena	17,484	31–28–8	70	
68	March 20	Montreal	3–4	NY Islanders	OT	Sorokin	UBS Arena	15,218	32–28–8	72	
69	March 22	Calgary	4–3	NY Islanders	OT	Hogberg	UBS Arena	17,255	32–28–9	73	
70	March 24	Columbus	4–3	NY Islanders	SO	Sorokin	UBS Arena	14,158	32–28–10	74	
71	March 26	Vancouver	5–2	NY Islanders		Sorokin	UBS Arena	15,254	32–29–10	74	
72	March 29	NY Islanders	3–5	Tampa Bay		Sorokin	Amalie Arena	19,092	32–30–10	74	
73	March 30	NY Islanders	4–6	Carolina		Hogberg	Lenovo Center	18,700	32–31–10	74	

April: 3–4–2 (Home: 2–3–0; Road: 1–1–2)

#	Date	Visitor	Score	Home	OT	Decision	Location	Attendance	Record	Points	Recap
74	April 1	Tampa Bay	4–1	NY Islanders		Sorokin	UBS Arena	14,827	32–32–10	74	
75	April 4	Minnesota	1–3	NY Islanders		Sorokin	UBS Arena	15,742	33–32–10	76	
76	April 6	Washington	1–4	NY Islanders		Sorokin	UBS Arena	17,255	34–32–10	78	
77	April 8	NY Islanders	6–7	Nashville	OT	Hogberg	Bridgestone Arena	17,159	34–32–11	79	
78	April 10	NY Rangers	9–2	NY Islanders		Hogberg	UBS Arena	17,255	34–33–11	79	
79	April 12	NY Islanders	3–4	Philadelphia	SO	Hogberg	Wells Fargo Center	19,259	34–33–12	80	
80	April 13	NY Islanders	1–0	New Jersey		Sorokin	Prudential Center	16,514	35–33–12	82	
81	April 15	Washington	3–1	NY Islanders		Sorokin	UBS Arena	17,255	35–34–12	82	
82	April 17	NY Islanders	1–6	Columbus		Hogberg	Nationwide Arena	18,874	35–35–12	82	

Legend: Win (2 points) Loss (0 points) OT/SO loss (1 point)

== Player statistics ==
As of April 17, 2025

=== Skaters ===
Regular season
Player	GP	G	A	Pts	+/−	PIM
Bo Horvat	81	28	29	57	–4	16
Anders Lee	82	29	25	54	3	35
Kyle Palmieri	82	24	24	48	–17	20
Simon Holmstrom	75	20	25	45	5	8
Brock Nelson^{‡}	61	20	23	43	2	14
Jean-Gabriel Pageau	79	14	28	42	4	23
Noah Dobson	71	10	29	39	–16	28
Maxim Tsyplakov	77	10	25	35	4	39
Ryan Pulock	74	5	18	23	2	16
Adam Pelech	60	0	21	21	4	32
Mathew Barzal	30	6	14	20	10	4
Alexander Romanov	64	4	16	20	5	20
Anothony DeAngelo	35	4	15	19	–11	10
Casey Cizikas	82	7	10	17	–13	51
Pierre Engvall	62	8	7	15	–7	16
Anthony Duclair	44	7	4	11	–15	10
Kyle MacLean	81	4	7	11	–15	14
Dennis Cholowski	33	3	7	10	1	10
Marc Gatcomb	39	8	1	9	–4	11
Scott Mayfield	66	3	6	9	18	27
Adam Boqvist^{†}	17	2	6	8	–5	4
Isaiah George	33	1	4	5	–3	6
Hudson Fasching	43	2	2	4	–4	6
Oliver Wahlstrom^{‡}	27	2	2	4	–6	9
Scott Perunovich^{†}	11	0	3	3	–4	4
Matt Martin	32	0	2	2	–5	10
Mike Reilly	18	0	2	2	–3	2
Grant Hutton	13	0	2	2	1	4
Julien Gauthier	1	0	0	0	0	0
Liam Foudy	2	0	0	0	–1	0
Samuel Bolduc	1	0	0	0	–1	0

=== Goaltenders ===
Regular season
Player	GP	GS	TOI	W	L	OT	GA	GAA	SA	SV%	SO	G	A	PIM
Ilya Sorokin	61	60	3498:51	30	24	6	158	2.71	1695	.907	4	1	2	2
Semyon Varlamov	10	10	602:24	3	4	3	29	2.89	262	.889	0	0	0	0
Marcus Hogberg	15	11	728:13	2	6	3	41	3.38	335	.878	0	0	0	0
Jakub Skarek	2	1	76:09	0	1	0	5	3.94	39	.872	0	0	0	0

- ^{†} Denotes player spent time with another team before joining the Islanders. Stats reflect time with the Islanders only.
- ^{‡} Denotes player was traded mid-season. Stats reflect time with the Islanders only.
- Bold/italics denotes franchise record.

== Awards and honors ==
=== Awards ===
Regular season
Player	Award	Date

== Transactions ==
The Islanders have been involved in the following transactions during the 2024–25 season.

Key:

† Contract is entry-level.
‡ Contract initially takes effect in the 2025–26 season.

=== Trades ===
Date	Details		Ref
January 27, 2025	To St. Louis Blues conditional 5th-round pick in 2026	To New York Islanders Scott Perunovich	
March 6, 2025	To Colorado Avalanche William Dufour; Brock Nelson*	To New York Islanders Oliver Kylington; Calum Ritchie conditional 1st-round pick in 2026 or 1st-round pick in 2027 conditional 3rd-round pick in 2028	
March 7, 2025	To Anaheim Ducks Oliver Kylington	To New York Islanders future considerations	
March 7, 2025	To New Jersey Devils Dennis Cholowski	To New York Islanders Adam Beckman	

=== Free agents ===
Date	Player	Team	Contract term	Ref
July 1, 2024	Anthony Duclair	from Tampa Bay Lightning	4-year	
July 2, 2024	Marc Gatcomb	from Abbotsford Canucks (AHL)	1-year	
July 2, 2024	Fredrik Karlstrom	from Dallas Stars	1-year	
July 2, 2024	Sebastian Aho	to Pittsburgh Penguins	2-year	
July 10, 2024	Liam Foudy	from Nashville Predators	1-year	
August 31, 2024	Robert Bortuzzo	to Utah Hockey Club	1-year	
January 24, 2025	Tony DeAngelo	from SKA Saint Petersburg (KHL)	1-year	
March 21, 2025	Gleb Veremyev	from Colorado College Tigers (NCHC)	2-year†‡	
March 31, 2025	Joey Larson	from Michigan State Spartans (B1G)	1-year†‡	

=== Waivers ===
Date	Player	Team	Ref
December 14, 2024	Oliver Wahlstrom	to Boston Bruins	
January 31, 2025	Adam Boqvist	from Florida Panthers	

=== Contract terminations ===
Date	Player	Via	Ref

=== Retirement ===
Date	Player	Ref
April 23, 2025	Cal Clutterbuck	
June 24, 2025	Matt Martin	

=== Signings ===
Date	Player	Contract term	Ref
July 25, 2024	Oliver Wahlstrom	1-year	
October 26, 2024	Matt Martin	1-year	
May 30, 2025	Adam Boqvist	1-year‡	
May 30, 2025	Kyle Palmieri	2-year‡	

== Draft picks ==
Below are the New York Islanders' selections at the 2024 NHL entry draft, which was held on June 28 and 29, 2024, at the Sphere in Paradise, Nevada.

Round	#	Player	Pos	Nationality	College/junior/club team
1	20	Cole Eiserman	LW	United States	U.S. NTDP (USHL)
2	54	Jesse Pulkkinen	D	Finland	JYP (Liiga)
2	61	Kamil Bednarik	C	United States	U.S. NTDP (USHL)
4	115	Dmitry Gamzin	G	Russia	HC Zvezda Moscow (VHL)
5	147	Marcus Gidlof	G	Sweden	Leksands IF (J20 Nationell)
6	179	Xavier Veilleux	D	Canada	Muskegon Lumberjacks (USHL)
