= Alexander Romanov (ice hockey, born 1980) =

Russian ice hockey player

- Born: August 18, 1980 (age 46) Voskresensk, USSR
- Height: 6 ft 3 in (191 cm)
- Weight: 209 lb (95 kg; 14 st 13 lb)
- Position: Right wing
- Shot: Left
- Played for: Khimik Voskresensk; HC Vityaz; HC Sibir Novosibirsk; Metallurg Novokuznetsk
- Playing career: 1998–2017

Alexander Romanov (born August 18, 1980) is a Russian former professional ice hockey winger who played in the Kontinental Hockey League (KHL).

== Career ==
A veteran of 17 professional top flight Russian seasons, Romanov joined Novokuznetsk from HC Sibir Novosibirsk as a free agent on August 20, 2014.
