= 2024–25 Washington Capitals season =

National Hockey League season

2024–25 Washington Capitals
- Metropolitan Division champions
- Division: 1st Metropolitan
- Conference: 1st Eastern
- 2024–25 record: 51–22–9
- Home record: 26–9–6
- Road record: 25–13–3
- Goals for: 288
- Goals against: 232

Team information
- General manager: Chris Patrick
- Coach: Spencer Carbery
- Captain: Alexander Ovechkin
- Alternate captains: Nicklas Backstrom; John Carlson; T. J. Oshie; Tom Wilson
- Arena: Capital One Arena
- Average attendance: 18,244
- Minor league affiliates: Hershey Bears (AHL); South Carolina Stingrays (ECHL)

Team leaders
- Goals: Alexander Ovechkin (42)
- Assists: Dylan Strome (51)
- Points: Dylan Strome (77)
- Penalty minutes: Brandon Duhaime (96)
- Plus/minus: Aliaksei Protas (+40)
- Wins: Logan Thompson (31)
- Goals against average: Logan Thompson (2.49)

The 2024–25 Washington Capitals season was the 51st season (50th season of play) for the National Hockey League (NHL) franchise that was established on June 11, 1974.

On March 20, 2025, the Capitals became the first team to clinch a playoff spot and their second consecutive berth with a win over the Philadelphia Flyers.

On April 4, 2025, captain Alexander Ovechkin scored his 894th goal, tying the all-time record for goals scored in the regular season held by Wayne Gretzky. Ovechkin also recorded his 136th game-winning goal, setting a new record for game-winning goals, and surpassing the record previously held by Jaromir Jagr. On April 6, he scored his 895th NHL regular season goal, breaking the record for most goals scored in the regular season held by Wayne Gretzky.

On April 8, the Capitals clinched the Metropolitan Division title for the first time since the 2019–20 season after the Carolina Hurricanes lost to the Buffalo Sabres.

On April 10, the Capitals clinched the best record in the Eastern Conference for the first time since the 2016–17 season with a win over the Carolina Hurricanes.

The Capitals defeated the Montreal Canadiens in five games in the first round, winning their first playoff series since their 2018 Stanley Cup victory, but were defeated by the Carolina Hurricanes in five games in the second round.

== Standings ==
=== Divisional standings ===
Metropolitan Division
Pos	Team	GP	W	L	OTL	RW	GF	GA	GD	Pts
1	z – Washington Capitals	82	51	22	9	43	288	232	+56	111
2	x – Carolina Hurricanes	82	47	30	5	42	266	233	+33	99
3	x – New Jersey Devils	82	42	33	7	36	242	222	+20	91
4	Columbus Blue Jackets	82	40	33	9	30	273	268	+5	89
5	New York Rangers	82	39	36	7	35	256	255	+1	85
6	New York Islanders	82	35	35	12	28	224	260	−36	82
7	Pittsburgh Penguins	82	34	36	12	24	243	293	−50	80
8	Philadelphia Flyers	82	33	39	10	21	238	286	−48	76

Source: National Hockey League
Rules for classification: 1) Fewer number of games played (GP, only during regular season); 2) Greater number of regulation wins (RW); 3) Greater number of wins in regulation and overtime, excluding shootout wins (ROW); 4) Greater number of total wins, including shootouts (W); 5) Greater number of points earned in head-to-head play; if teams played an uneven number of head-to-head games, the result of the first game on the home ice of the team with the extra home game is discarded; 6) Greater goal differential (GD); 7) Greater number of goals scored (GF)
x – Clinched playoff spot; z – Clinched conference

=== Conference standings ===
Eastern Conference Wild Card
Pos	Div	Team	GP	W	L	OTL	RW	GF	GA	GD	Pts
1	AT	x – Ottawa Senators	82	45	30	7	35	243	234	+9	97
2	AT	x – Montreal Canadiens	82	40	31	11	30	245	265	−20	91
3	ME	Columbus Blue Jackets	82	40	33	9	30	273	268	+5	89
4	AT	Detroit Red Wings	82	39	35	8	30	238	259	−21	86
5	ME	New York Rangers	82	39	36	7	35	256	255	+1	85
6	ME	New York Islanders	82	35	35	12	28	224	260	−36	82
7	ME	Pittsburgh Penguins	82	34	36	12	24	243	293	−50	80
8	AT	Buffalo Sabres	82	36	39	7	29	269	289	−20	79
9	AT	Boston Bruins	82	33	39	10	26	222	272	−50	76
10	ME	Philadelphia Flyers	82	33	39	10	21	238	286	−48	76

Source: National Hockey League
Rules for classification: 1) Fewer number of games played (GP, only during regular season); 2) Greater number of regulation wins (RW); 3) Greater number of wins in regulation and overtime, excluding shootout wins (ROW); 4) Greater number of total wins, including shootouts (W); 5) Greater number of points earned in head-to-head play; if teams played an uneven number of head-to-head games, the result of the first game on the home ice of the team with the extra home game is discarded; 6) Greater goal differential (GD); 7) Greater number of goals scored (GF)
x – Clinched playoff spot

== Schedule and results ==
=== Preseason ===
The preseason schedule was released on June 24, 2024.

2024 preseason game log: 3–3–0 (Home: 1–2–0; Road: 2–1–0)

#	Date	Visitor	Score	Home	OT	Decision	Location	Attendance	Record
1	September 22	Philadelphia	6–2	Washington		Shepard	Capital One Arena	12,851	0–1–0
2	September 24	Washington	2–4	Boston		Shepard	TD Garden	17,850	0–2–0
3	September 25	Washington	5–3	New Jersey		Thompson	Prudential Center	7,092	1–2–0
4	September 27	Columbus	8–4	Washington		Lindgren	Capital One Arena	13,009	1–3–0
5	September 30	Washington	3–2	Columbus		Thompson	Nationwide Arena	10,080	2–3–0
6	October 5	Boston	0–2	Washington		Lindgren	Capital One Arena	13,224	3–3–0

Legend

Win Loss OT/SO Loss

=== Regular season ===
The regular season schedule was released on July 2, 2024.

2024–25 game log
October: 7–2–0 (Home: 5–1–0; Road: 2–1–0)

#	Date	Visitor	Score	Home	OT	Decision	Location	Attendance	Record	Points	Recap
1	October 12	New Jersey	5–3	Washington		Lindgren	Capital One Arena	18,573	0–1–0	0	
2	October 15	Vegas	2–4	Washington		Thompson	Capital One Arena	16,727	1–1–0	2	
3	October 17	Dallas	2–3	Washington		Lindgren	Capital One Arena	17,034	2–1–0	4	
4	October 19	Washington	6–5	New Jersey	OT	Thompson	Prudential Center	16,514	3–1–0	6	
5	October 22	Washington	4–1	Philadelphia		Lindgren	Wells Fargo Center	18,132	4–1–0	8	
6	October 23	Philadelphia	3–6	Washington		Thompson	Capital One Arena	17,254	5–1–0	10	
7	October 26	Washington	0–3	Tampa Bay		Lindgren	Amalie Arena	19,092	5–2–0	10	
8	October 29	NY Rangers	3–5	Washington		Thompson	Capital One Arena	17,390	6–2–0	12	
9	October 31	Montreal	3–6	Washington		Lindgren	Capital One Arena	15,789	7–2–0	14	

November: 10–4–1 (Home: 3–3–1; Road: 7–1–0)

#	Date	Visitor	Score	Home	OT	Decision	Location	Attendance	Record	Points	Recap
10	November 2	Columbus	2–7	Washington		Thompson	Capital One Arena	17,666	8–2–0	16	
11	November 3	Washington	2–4	Carolina		Lindgren	Lenovo Center	18,796	8–3–0	16	
12	November 6	Nashville	2–3	Washington		Thompson	Capital One Arena	17,177	9–3–0	18	
13	November 8	Pittsburgh	4–2	Washington		Lindgren	Capital One Arena	18,573	9–4–0	18	
14	November 9	Washington	8–1	St. Louis		Thompson	Enterprise Center	18,096	10–4–0	20	
15	November 13	Toronto	4–3	Washington	OT	Thompson	Capital One Arena	18,573	10–4–1	21	
16	November 15	Washington	5–2	Colorado		Lindgren	Ball Arena	18,083	11–4–1	23	
17	November 17	Washington	5–2	Vegas		Thompson	T-Mobile Arena	17,877	12–4–1	25	
18	November 18	Washington	6–2	Utah		Lindgren	Delta Center	11,131	13–4–1	27	
19	November 21	Colorado	2–1	Washington		Thompson	Capital One Arena	17,414	13–5–1	27	
20	November 23	New Jersey	3–2	Washington		Lindgren	Capital One Arena	18,573	13–6–1	27	
21	November 25	Washington	4–1	Florida		Thompson	Amerant Bank Arena	18,504	14–6–1	29	
22	November 27	Washington	5–4	Tampa Bay		Lindgren	Amalie Arena	19,092	15–6–1	31	
23	November 29	NY Islanders	4–5	Washington	OT	Thompson	Capital One Arena	18,573	16–6–1	33	
24	November 30	Washington	6–5	New Jersey		Lindgren	Prudential Center	16,514	17–6–1	35	

December: 8–4–1 (Home: 4–0–1; Road: 4–4–0)

#	Date	Visitor	Score	Home	OT	Decision	Location	Attendance	Record	Points	Recap
25	December 3	San Jose	2–1	Washington	OT	Thompson	Capital One Arena	17,859	17–6–2	36	
26	December 6	Washington	3–1	Toronto		Lindgren	Scotiabank Arena	18,723	18–6–2	38	
27	December 7	Washington	4–2	Montreal		Thompson	Bell Centre	21,105	19–6–2	40	
28	December 12	Washington	2–1	Columbus	OT	Thompson	Nationwide Arena	15,962	20–6–2	42	
29	December 14	Buffalo	2–4	Washington		Thompson	Capital One Arena	18,573	21–6–2	44	
30	December 16	Washington	1–3	Dallas		Lindgren	American Airlines Center	18,532	21–7–2	44	
31	December 17	Washington	2–3	Chicago		Thompson	United Center	18,511	21–8–2	44	
32	December 20	Carolina	1–3	Washington		Lindgren	Capital One Arena	18,573	22–8–2	46	
33	December 22	Los Angeles	1–3	Washington		Thompson	Capital One Arena	18,573	23–8–2	48	
34	December 23	Washington	1–4	Boston		Lindgren	TD Garden	17,850	23–9–2	48	
35	December 28	Washington	5–2	Toronto		Thompson	Scotiabank Arena	19,125	24–9–2	50	
36	December 29	Washington	2–4	Detroit		Lindgren	Little Caesars Arena	19,515	24–10–2	50	
37	December 31	Boston	1–3	Washington		Thompson	Capital One Arena	18,573	25–10–2	52	

January: 9–1–4 (Home: 4–0–2; Road: 5–1–2)

#	Date	Visitor	Score	Home	OT	Decision	Location	Attendance	Record	Points	Recap
38	January 2	Minnesota	4–3	Washington	SO	Lindgren	Capital One Arena	18,573	25–10–3	53	
39	January 4	NY Rangers	4–7	Washington		Thompson	Capital One Arena	18,573	26–10–3	55	
40	January 6	Washington	3–4	Buffalo	SO	Lindgren	KeyBank Center	15,548	26–10–4	56	
41	January 8	Vancouver	1–2	Washington	OT	Thompson	Capital One Arena	17,941	27–10–4	58	
42	January 10	Montreal	3–2	Washington	OT	Thompson	Capital One Arena	18,573	27–10–5	59	
43	January 11	Washington	4–1	Nashville		Thompson	Bridgestone Arena	17,159	28–10–5	61	
44	January 14	Anaheim	0–3	Washington		Thompson	Capital One Arena	18,573	29–10–5	63	
45	January 16	Washington	1–0	Ottawa	OT	Thompson	Canadian Tire Centre	17,242	30–10–5	65	
46	January 18	Pittsburgh	1–4	Washington		Thompson	Capital One Arena	18,573	31–10–5	67	
47	January 21	Washington	3–2	Edmonton		Thompson	Rogers Place	18,347	32–10–5	69	
48	January 23	Washington	3–0	Seattle		Lindgren	Climate Pledge Arena	17,151	33–10–5	71	
49	January 25	Washington	1–2	Vancouver		Lindgren	Rogers Arena	18,876	33–11–5	71	
50	January 28	Washington	3–1	Calgary		Thompson	Scotiabank Saddledome	17,455	34–11–5	73	
51	January 30	Washington	4–5	Ottawa	OT	Lindgren	Canadian Tire Centre	18,792	34–11–6	74	

February: 4–2–2 (Home: 2–2–2; Road: 2–0–0)

#	Date	Visitor	Score	Home	OT	Decision	Location	Attendance	Record	Points	Recap
52	February 1	Winnipeg	5–4	Washington	OT	Thompson	Capital One Arena	18,573	34–11–7	75	
53	February 4	Florida	3–6	Washington		Thompson	Capital One Arena	18,573	35–11–7	77	
54	February 6	Washington	4–3	Philadelphia		Lindgren	Wells Fargo Center	18,726	36–11–7	79	
55	February 9	Utah	5–4	Washington	SO	Thompson	Capital One Arena	18,573	36–11–8	80	
56	February 22	Washington	8–3	Pittsburgh		Thompson	PPG Paints Arena	18,207	37–11–8	82	
57	February 23	Edmonton	3–7	Washington		Lindgren	Capital One Arena	18,573	38–11–8	84	
58	February 25	Calgary	3–1	Washington		Thompson	Capital One Arena	18,573	38–12–8	84	
59	February 27	St. Louis	5–2	Washington		Lindgren	Capital One Arena	18,573	38–13–8	84	

March: 9–4–1 (Home: 6–2–0; Road: 3–2–1)

#	Date	Visitor	Score	Home	OT	Decision	Location	Attendance	Record	Points	Recap
60	March 1	Tampa Bay	3–1	Washington		Thompson	Capital One Arena	18,573	38–14–8	84	
61	March 3	Ottawa	4–5	Washington	SO	Thompson	Capital One Arena	18,573	39–14–8	86	
62	March 5	Washington	3–2	NY Rangers	OT	Lindgren	Madison Square Garden	18,006	40–14–8	88	
63	March 7	Detroit	2–5	Washington		Thompson	Capital One Arena	18,573	41–14–8	90	
64	March 9	Seattle	2–4	Washington		Lindgren	Capital One Arena	18,573	42–14–8	92	
65	March 11	Washington	7–4	Anaheim		Thompson	Honda Center	16,507	43–14–8	94	
66	March 13	Washington	0–3	Los Angeles		Lindgren	Crypto.com Arena	18,145	43–15–8	94	
67	March 15	Washington	5–1	San Jose		Thompson	SAP Center	17,435	44–15–8	96	
68	March 18	Detroit	1–4	Washington		Thompson	Capital One Arena	18,573	45–15–8	98	
69	March 20	Philadelphia	2–3	Washington		Lindgren	Capital One Arena	18,573	46–15–8	100	
70	March 22	Florida	3–6	Washington		Thompson	Capital One Arena	18,573	47–15–8	102	
71	March 25	Washington	2–3	Winnipeg	OT	Thompson	Canada Life Centre	15,225	47–15–9	103	
72	March 27	Washington	2–4	Minnesota		Lindgren	Xcel Energy Center	19,108	47–16–9	103	
73	March 30	Buffalo	8–5	Washington		Thompson	Capital One Arena	18,573	47–17–9	103	

April: 4–5–0 (Home: 2–1–0; Road: 2–4–0)

#	Date	Visitor	Score	Home	OT	Decision	Location	Attendance	Record	Points	Recap
74	April 1	Washington	4–3	Boston		Lindgren	TD Garden	17,850	48–17–9	105	
75	April 2	Washington	1–5	Carolina		Thompson	Lenovo Center	18,908	48–18–9	105	
76	April 4	Chicago	3–5	Washington		Lindgren	Capital One Arena	18,573	49–18–9	107	
77	April 6	Washington	1–4	NY Islanders		Lindgren	UBS Arena	17,255	49–19–9	107	
78	April 10	Carolina	4–5	Washington	SO	Lindgren	Capital One Arena	18,573	50–19–9	109	
79	April 12	Washington	0–7	Columbus		Shepard	Nationwide Arena	18,645	50–20–9	109	
80	April 13	Columbus	4–1	Washington		Lindgren	Capital One Arena	18,573	50–21–9	109	
81	April 15	Washington	3–1	NY Islanders		Lindgren	UBS Arena	17,255	51–21–9	111	
82	April 17	Washington	2–5	Pittsburgh		Stevenson	PPG Paints Arena	18,348	51–22–9	111	

Win (2 points) Loss (0 points) Overtime/shootout loss (1 point)

=== Playoffs ===
2025 Stanley Cup Playoffs
Eastern Conference first round vs (WC2) Montreal Canadiens: Washington won 4–1

#	Date	Visitor	Score	Home	OT	Decision	Location	Attendance	Series	Recap
1	April 21	Montreal	2–3	Washington	OT	Thompson	Capital One Arena	18,573	1–0	
2	April 23	Montreal	1–3	Washington		Thompson	Capital One Arena	18,573	2–0	
3	April 25	Washington	3–6	Montreal		Thompson	Bell Centre	21,105	2–1	
4	April 27	Washington	5–2	Montreal		Thompson	Bell Centre	21,105	3–1	
5	April 30	Montreal	1–4	Washington		Thompson	Capital One Arena	18,573	4–1	

Eastern Conference second round vs (M2) Carolina Hurricanes: Carolina won 4–1

#	Date	Visitor	Score	Home	OT	Decision	Location	Attendance	Series	Recap
1	May 6	Carolina	2–1	Washington	OT	Thompson	Capital One Arena	18,573	0–1	
2	May 8	Carolina	1–3	Washington		Thompson	Capital One Arena	18,573	1–1	
3	May 10	Washington	0–4	Carolina		Thompson	Lenovo Center	19,174	1–2	
4	May 12	Washington	2–5	Carolina		Thompson	Lenovo Center	19,138	1–3	
5	May 15	Carolina	3–1	Washington		Thompson	Capital One Arena	18,573	1–4	

Win Loss

== Player stats ==
As of April 4, 2025

=== Skaters ===
Regular season
Player	GP	G	A	Pts	+/−	PIM
Dylan Strome	82	29	53	82	+2	34
Alexander Ovechkin	65	44	29	73	+15	14
Aliaksei Protas	76	30	36	66	+40	18
Pierre-Luc Dubois	82	20	46	66	+27	76
Tom Wilson	81	33	32	65	+20	100
Connor McMichael	82	26	31	57	+19	49
John Carlson	79	5	46	51	+17	22
Jakob Chychrun	74	20	27	47	+17	52
Rasmus Sandin	82	4	26	30	+13	23
Andrew Mangiapane	81	14	14	28	0	24
Nic Dowd	82	14	13	27	+7	56
Taylor Raddysh	80	7	20	27	–7	18
Martin Fehervary	81	5	20	25	+18	25
Matt Roy	69	3	21	24	+18	25
Brandon Duhaime	82	9	12	21	+3	98
Trevor van Riemsdyk	82	1	20	21	+20	34
Lars Eller^{†}	63	6	9	15	–1	26
Jakub Vrana^{‡}	26	7	4	11	+6	6
Hendrix Lapierre	27	0	8	8	–3	4
Ethen Frank	24	4	3	7	+3	6
Anthony Beauvillier^{†}	18	2	3	5	+3	0
Ivan Miroshnichenko	18	1	3	4	+1	0
Michael Sgarbossa	3	1	1	2	+2	2
Dylan McIlrath	17	0	2	2	–3	28
Ryan Leonard	9	1	0	1	–4	11
Sonny Milano	3	0	0	0	–3	0
Alexander Alexeyev	8	0	0	0	+2	0

Playoffs
Player	GP	G	A	Pts	+/−	PIM
Dylan Strome	10	2	9	11	0	2
Tom Wilson	10	3	4	7	3	14
Alex Ovechkin	10	5	1	6	0	6
Connor McMichael	10	4	2	6	3	2
Anthony Beauvillier	10	2	4	6	1	2
Jakob Chychrun	10	3	2	5	3	6
Brandon Duhaime	10	3	1	4	–4	10
John Carlson	10	1	2	3	3	2
Pierre-Luc Dubois	10	0	3	3	3	12
Andrew Mangiapane	10	1	1	2	1	14
Aliaksei Protas	6	1	1	2	–2	0
Trevor van Riemsdyk	10	0	2	2	0	4
Matt Roy	10	0	2	2	–1	2
Lars Eller	9	0	1	1	–1	2
Nic Dowd	10	0	1	1	–3	8
Taylor Raddysh	7	0	1	1	–1	4
Rasmus Sandin	10	0	1	1	–1	0
Ryan Leonard	8	0	1	1	1	2
Alexander Alexeyev	10	0	0	0	–2	4

=== Goaltenders ===
Regular season
Player	GP	GS	TOI	W	L	OT	GA	GAA	SA	SV%	SO	G	A	P	PIM
Logan Thompson	43	42	2,535:09	31	6	6	105	2.49	1,172	.910	2	0	1	1	0
Charlie Lindgren	39	38	2,287:00	20	14	3	104	2.73	985	.898	1	0	0	0	0
Clay Stevenson	1	1	60:00	0	1	0	5	5.00	38	.868	0	0	0	0	0
Hunter Shepard	1	1	60:00	0	1	0	7	7.00	26	.731	0	0	0	0	0

Playoffs
Player	GP	GS	TOI	W	L	GA	GAA	SA	SV%	SO	G	A	PIM
Logan Thompson	10	10	234:31	5	5	24	2.41	290	.917	0	0	0	0
Charlie Lindgren	1	0	234:31	0	0	1	9.07	5	.800	0	0	0	0

^{†}Denotes player spent time with another team before joining the Capitals. Stats reflect time with the Capitals only.
^{‡}No longer with the Capitals.

== Transactions ==
The Capitals have been involved in the following transactions during the 2024–25 season.

Key:

† Contract is entry-level.
‡ Contract initially takes effect in the 2025–26 season.

=== Trades ===
Date	Details		Ref
June 29, 2024	To Buffalo Sabres Beck Malenstyn	To Washington Capitals 2nd-round pick in 2024	
June 29, 2024	To Vegas Golden Knights NYI 3rd-round pick in 2024; 3rd-round pick in 2025	To Washington Capitals Logan Thompson	
June 29, 2024	To New Jersey Devils 3rd-round pick in 2024; 5th-round pick in 2024	To Washington Capitals 3rd-round pick in 2024	
July 1, 2024	To Ottawa Senators Nick Jensen; 3rd-round pick in 2026	To Washington Capitals Jakob Chychrun	
November 12, 2024	To Pittsburgh Penguins CHI 5th-round pick in 2025; 3rd-round pick in 2027	To Washington Capitals Lars Eller	
March 7, 2025	To Pittsburgh Penguins 2nd-round pick in 2025	To Washington Capitals Anthony Beauvillier	

=== Players acquired ===
Date	Player	Former team	Term	Via	Ref
July 1, 2024	Brandon Duhaime	Colorado Avalanche	2-year	Free agency	
July 1, 2024	Taylor Raddysh	Chicago Blackhawks	1-year	Free agency	
July 1, 2024	Matt Roy	Los Angeles Kings	6-year	Free agency	
July 2, 2024	Luke Philp	Chicago Blackhawks	1-year	Free agency	
July 2, 2024	Spencer Smallman	Chicago Blackhawks	1-year	Free agency	
October 7, 2024	Jakub Vrana	St. Louis Blues	1-year	Free agency	

=== Players lost ===
Date	Player	New team	Term	Via	Ref
July 1, 2024	Nicolas Aube-Kubel	Buffalo Sabres	1-year	Free agency	
July 2, 2024	Joe Snively	Detroit Red Wings	1-year	Free agency	
August 9, 2024	Matthew Phillips	Colorado Avalanche	1-year	Free agency	
October 7, 2024	Max Pacioretty	Toronto Maple Leafs	1-year	Free agency	
March 6, 2025	Jakub Vrana	Nashville Predators		Waivers	

=== Signings ===
Date	Player	Term	Ref
July 5, 2024	Terik Parascak	3-year†	
September 27, 2024	Eriks Mateiko	3-year†	
January 27, 2025	Logan Thompson	6-year	
March 3, 2025	Charlie Lindgren	3-year	
March 25, 2025	Jakob Chychrun	8-year	
March 27, 2025	Dylan McIlrath	2-year	
March 31, 2025	David Gucciardi	2-year†‡	
March 31, 2025	Ryan Leonard	3-year†	

== Draft picks ==
Below are the Washington Capitals's selections at the 2024 NHL entry draft, which was held on June 28 and 29, 2024, at the Sphere in Paradise, Nevada.

Round	#	Player	Pos	Nationality	College/Junior/Club team (League)
1	17	Terik Parascak	RW	Canada	Prince George Cougars (WHL)
2	43	Cole Hutson	D	United States	U.S. NTDP (USHL)
2	52	Leon Muggli	D	Switzerland	EV Zug (National League)
3	75	Ilya Protas	LW	Belarus	Des Moines Buccaneers (USHL)
3	90	Eriks Mateiko	W	Latvia	Saint John Sea Dogs (QMJHL)
4	114	Nicholas Kempf	G	United States	U.S. NTDP (USHL)
6	178	Petr Sikora	C	Czech Republic	HC Oceláři Třinec (Czech U20)
7	212	Miroslav Satan	C	Slovakia	HC Slovan Bratislava (Slovakia U20)
