= Pavel Moysevich =

Belarusian ice hockey player (born 2004)

- Born: September 29, 2004 (age 21) Minsk, Belarus
- Height: 6 ft 5 in (196 cm)
- Weight: 176 lb (80 kg; 12 st 8 lb)
- Position: Goaltender
- Catches: Left
- NHL team (P) Cur. team Former teams: Vegas Golden Knights; Henderson Silver Knights (AHL); SKA St. Petersburg
- National team: Belarus
- NHL draft: 83rd overall, 2024; Vegas Golden Knights
- Playing career: 2022–present

Pavel Leonidovich Moysevich (Russian: Павел Леонидович Мойсевич, born September 29, 2004) is a Belarusian ice hockey player who is a goaltender for the Henderson Silver Knights of the American Hockey League (AHL), while under contract to the Vegas Golden Knights of the National Hockey League (NHL). He was selected 83rd overall, in the third round of the 2024 NHL entry draft by the Golden Knights, and has also played in the Kontinental Hockey League (KHL) for SKA St. Petersburg.

== Playing career ==
Moysevich made his professional debut in the 2020–21 season with Sobol Beryoza of the Vysshaya Liga, the second tier of professional hockey in Belarus. In the 2021–22 season, he played for the Belarusian national under-18 team. The team, which competed in the Vysshaya Liga, was meant to attend the 2022 World U18 Championship, but could not due to the country's suspension in the wake of the Russian invasion of Ukraine.

Moving to Russia for the 2022–23 season, Moysevich joined Kapitan Stupino, the Junior Hockey League (MHL) affiliate of HC Sochi. In the tenth week of the season, he recorded two shutouts, making 124 saves on 126 shots and earning MHL goaltender of the week honors. In November 2022, he was traded to SKA St. Petersburg, where he finished the season splitting time between their MHL and Supreme Hockey League (VHL) affiliates.

Moysevich made his Kontinental Hockey League (KHL) debut on October 25, 2023, in relief of Artemy Pleshkov. In 47 minutes in the 6–3 victory over Kunlun Red Star, he stopped each of the 12 shots he faced. In his first 242 minutes of KHL play, he did not concede a single goal, setting a league record despite not recording a single shutout. In the second period of a 9–5 loss to Avangard Omsk on February 6, 2024, Moysevich sustained an injury. In total, he appeared in 13 KHL games over the course of the season, though many were relief appearances or minutes played towards the ends of matches whose results were foregone conclusions. On March 1, 2024, Moysevich made his KHL playoff debut against Torpedo Nizhny Novgorod, in relief of Nikita Serebryakov. Returning to SKA-1946 for the MHL playoffs, Moysevich recorded a .945 save percentage and a shutout in ten games en route to a Kharlamov Cup championship.

In the 2024 NHL entry draft, Moysevich was selected in the third round, 83rd overall by the Vegas Golden Knights. The Golden Knights had acquired the pick from the Washington Capitals that day, in exchange for goaltender Logan Thompson. Moysevich signed his three-year, entry-level contract with Vegas on March 23, 2026.

== International play ==
Moysevich represented Belarus at the 2023 Channel One Cup.

== Career statistics ==
			Regular season									Playoffs
Season	Team	League	GP	W	L	T/OT	MIN	GA	SO	GAA	SV%	GP	W	L	MIN	GA	SO	GAA	SV%
2020–21	Sobol Beryoza	BLR.2	49	17	32	0	2,632	164	2	3.74	—	—	—	—	—	—	—	—	—
2021–22	Belarus U18	BLR.2	28	23	5	0	1,471	60	3	2.44	.898	4	1	3	204	10	0	2.94	.890
2022–23	Kapitan Stupino	MHL	5	3	2	0	276	14	2	3.04	.923	—	—	—	—	—	—	—	—
2022–23	SKA-1946	MHL	4	3	1	0	211	7	1	1.99	.921	—	—	—	—	—	—	—	—
2022–23	SKA Varyagi	MHL	5	1	3	1	265	24	0	5.42	.881	—	—	—	—	—	—	—	—
2022–23	SKA-Neva	VHL	4	1	2	0	178	12	0	4.04	.862	—	—	—	—	—	—	—	—
2023–24	SKA-1946	MHL	—	—	—	—	—	—	—	—	—	10	8	2	496	16	1	1.93	.946
2023–24	SKA-Neva	VHL	19	10	7	2	1,116	43	0	2.31	.927	—	—	—	—	—	—	—	—
2023–24	SKA Saint Petersburg	KHL	13	3	2	2	575	12	0	1.25	.942	1	0	1	49	1	0	1.21	.946
2024–25	SKA Saint Petersburg	KHL	18	6	9	1	794	44	1	3.32	.898	—	—	—	—	—	—	—	—
2024–25	SKA-Neva	VHL	5	4	1	0	270	9	0	2.00	.926	1	0	1	46	4	0	5.25	.857
2025–26	SKA-VMF	VHL	10	5	3	0	499	20	1	2.41	.917	—	—	—	—	—	—	—	—
KHL totals			31	9	11	3	1,369	56	1	2.45	.912	1	0	1	49	1	0	1.21	.946
