= 2024–25 Detroit Red Wings season =

NHL team season

2024–25 Detroit Red Wings
- Division: 6th Atlantic
- Conference: 10th Eastern
- 2024–25 record: 39–35–8
- Home record: 22–16–3
- Road record: 17–19–5
- Goals for: 238
- Goals against: 259

Team information
- General manager: Steve Yzerman
- Coach: Derek Lalonde (Oct. 10 – Dec. 26); Todd McLellan (Dec. 26 – Apr. 17)
- Captain: Dylan Larkin
- Alternate captains: Rotating; Rotating
- Arena: Little Caesars Arena
- Average attendance: 19,345
- Minor league affiliates: Grand Rapids Griffins (AHL); Toledo Walleye (ECHL)

Team leaders
- Goals: Alex DeBrincat (39)
- Assists: Lucas Raymond (53)
- Points: Lucas Raymond (80)
- Penalty minutes: Ben Chiarot (69)
- Plus/minus: Simon Edvinsson (+12)
- Wins: Cam Talbot (21)
- Goals against average: Sebastian Cossa (2.67)

The 2024–25 Detroit Red Wings season was the 99th season for the National Hockey League (NHL) franchise that was established on September 25, 1926. It was the Red Wings' eighth season at Little Caesars Arena. This was the Red Wings' third season under head coach Derek Lalonde, until he was fired and replaced by Todd McLellan on December 26, 2024.

The Red Wings were eliminated from playoff contention for the ninth consecutive season on April 12, 2025, after the Montreal Canadiens lost in overtime to the Toronto Maple Leafs. This extended their longest playoff drought in franchise history. They finished the season with a 39–35–8 record.

== Standings ==
=== Divisional standings ===
Atlantic Division
Pos	Team	GP	W	L	OTL	RW	GF	GA	GD	Pts
1	y – Toronto Maple Leafs	82	52	26	4	41	268	231	+37	108
2	x – Tampa Bay Lightning	82	47	27	8	41	294	219	+75	102
3	x – Florida Panthers	82	47	31	4	37	252	223	+29	98
4	x – Ottawa Senators	82	45	30	7	35	243	234	+9	97
5	x – Montreal Canadiens	82	40	31	11	30	245	265	−20	91
6	Detroit Red Wings	82	39	35	8	30	238	259	−21	86
7	Buffalo Sabres	82	36	39	7	29	269	289	−20	79
8	Boston Bruins	82	33	39	10	26	222	272	−50	76

Source: National Hockey League
Rules for classification: 1) Fewer number of games played (GP, only during regular season); 2) Greater number of regulation wins (RW); 3) Greater number of wins in regulation and overtime, excluding shootout wins (ROW); 4) Greater number of total wins, including shootouts (W); 5) Greater number of points earned in head-to-head play; if teams played an uneven number of head-to-head games, the result of the first game on the home ice of the team with the extra home game is discarded; 6) Greater goal differential (GD); 7) Greater number of goals scored (GF)
x – Clinched playoff spot; y – Clinched division

=== Conference standings ===
Eastern Conference Wild Card
Pos	Div	Team	GP	W	L	OTL	RW	GF	GA	GD	Pts
1	AT	x – Ottawa Senators	82	45	30	7	35	243	234	+9	97
2	AT	x – Montreal Canadiens	82	40	31	11	30	245	265	−20	91
3	ME	Columbus Blue Jackets	82	40	33	9	30	273	268	+5	89
4	AT	Detroit Red Wings	82	39	35	8	30	238	259	−21	86
5	ME	New York Rangers	82	39	36	7	35	256	255	+1	85
6	ME	New York Islanders	82	35	35	12	28	224	260	−36	82
7	ME	Pittsburgh Penguins	82	34	36	12	24	243	293	−50	80
8	AT	Buffalo Sabres	82	36	39	7	29	269	289	−20	79
9	AT	Boston Bruins	82	33	39	10	26	222	272	−50	76
10	ME	Philadelphia Flyers	82	33	39	10	21	238	286	−48	76

Source: National Hockey League
Rules for classification: 1) Fewer number of games played (GP, only during regular season); 2) Greater number of regulation wins (RW); 3) Greater number of wins in regulation and overtime, excluding shootout wins (ROW); 4) Greater number of total wins, including shootouts (W); 5) Greater number of points earned in head-to-head play; if teams played an uneven number of head-to-head games, the result of the first game on the home ice of the team with the extra home game is discarded; 6) Greater goal differential (GD); 7) Greater number of goals scored (GF)
x – Clinched playoff spot

== Schedule and results ==
=== Preseason ===
2024 preseason game log: 3–3–2 (Home: 1–2–1; Road: 2–1–1)
#	Date	Visitor	Score	Home	OT	Decision	Attendance	Record	Recap
1	September 25	Detroit	4–2	Chicago		Husso	10,354	1–0–0
2	September 27	Chicago	0–2	Detroit		Lyon	11,175	2–0–0
—	September 28	Pittsburgh	—	Detroit	Game postponed due to Penguins travel issues. Rescheduled to September 30
3	September 30	Detroit	3–4	Buffalo	OT	Campbell	11,245	2–0–1
4	September 30	Pittsburgh	5–1	Detroit		Talbot	5,775	2–1–1
5	October 1	Detroit	2–1	Pittsburgh		Husso	12,059	3–1–1
6	October 3	Toronto	2–0	Detroit		Talbot	11,349	3–2–1
7	October 4	Ottawa	4–3	Detroit	OT	Lyon	10,080	3–2–2
8	October 5	Detroit	2–3	Toronto		Husso	18,524	3–3–2

=== Regular season ===
2024–25 game log: 39–35–8 (Home: 22–16–3; Road: 17–19–5)

October: 4–5–1 (Home: 2–3–1; Road: 2–2–0)
#	Date	Visitor	Score	Home	OT	Decision	Attendance	Record	Pts	Recap
1	October 10	Pittsburgh	6–3	Detroit		Husso	17,916	0–1–0	0
2	October 12	Nashville	0–3	Detroit		Talbot	19,515	1–1–0	2
3	October 14	Detroit	1–4	NY Rangers		Lyon	17,510	1–2–0	2
4	October 17	NY Rangers	5–2	Detroit		Talbot	19,515	1–3–0	2
5	October 19	Detroit	5–2	Nashville		Lyon	17,159	2–3–0	4
6	October 22	Detroit	1–0	NY Islanders		Lyon	12,739	3–3–0	6
7	October 24	New Jersey	3–5	Detroit		Talbot	19,515	4–3–0	8
8	October 26	Detroit	3–5	Buffalo		Lyon	15,017	4–4–0	8
9	October 27	Edmonton	3–2	Detroit	OT	Talbot	19,515	4–4–1	9
10	October 30	Winnipeg	6–2	Detroit		Lyon	18,780	4–5–1	9

November: 6–6–1 (Home: 3–3–0; Road: 3–3–1)
#	Date	Visitor	Score	Home	OT	Decision	Attendance	Record	Pts	Recap
11	November 2	Buffalo	1–2	Detroit		Talbot	19,515	5–5–1	11
12	November 6	Detroit	4–1	Chicago		Talbot	19,984	6–5–1	13
13	November 8	Detroit	1–3	Toronto		Talbot	19,152	6–6–1	13
14	November 9	NY Rangers	4–0	Detroit		Husso	19,515	6–7–1	13
15	November 13	Detroit	3–2	Pittsburgh	OT	Talbot	15,191	7–7–1	15
16	November 15	Detroit	4–6	Anaheim		Lyon	14,154	7–8–1	15
17	November 16	Detroit	1–4	Los Angeles		Talbot	18,145	7–9–1	15
18	November 18	Detroit	4–5	San Jose	OT	Talbot	11,180	7–9–2	16
19	November 21	NY Islanders	1–2	Detroit		Lyon	19,013	8–9–2	18
20	November 23	Boston	2–1	Detroit		Talbot	19,515	8–10–2	18
21	November 25	Detroit	4–2	NY Islanders		Lyon	14,900	9–10–2	20
22	November 27	Calgary	1–2	Detroit	OT	Talbot	19,515	10–10–2	22
23	November 29	New Jersey	5–4	Detroit		Talbot	19,515	10–11–2	22

December: 5–7–2 (Home: 4–4–1; Road: 1–3–1)
#	Date	Visitor	Score	Home	OT	Decision	Attendance	Record	Pts	Recap
24	December 1	Vancouver	5–4	Detroit	OT	Husso	19,515	10–11–3	23
25	December 3	Detroit	2–3	Boston	OT	Husso	17,950	10–11–4	24
26	December 5	Detroit	1–2	Ottawa		Husso	16,739	10–12–4	24
27	December 7	Colorado	2–1	Detroit		Husso	19,515	10–13–4	24
28	December 9	Detroit	6–5	Buffalo	SO	Cossa	14,559	11–13–4	26
29	December 12	Detroit	1–4	Philadelphia		Talbot	18,377	11–14–4	26
30	December 14	Toronto	2–4	Detroit		Husso	19,515	12–14–4	28
31	December 18	Philadelphia	4–6	Detroit		Lyon	19,515	13–14–4	30
32	December 20	Montreal	4–3	Detroit		Talbot	19,515	13–15–4	30
33	December 21	Detroit	1–5	Montreal		Lyon	21,105	13–16–4	30
34	December 23	St. Louis	4–0	Detroit		Talbot	19,515	13–17–4	30
35	December 27	Toronto	5–2	Detroit		Talbot	19,515	13–18–4	30
36	December 29	Washington	2–4	Detroit		Lyon	19,515	14–18–4	32
37	December 31	Pittsburgh	2–4	Detroit		Lyon	19,515	15–18–4	34

January: 10–3–1 (Home: 6–1–0; Road: 4–2–1)
#	Date	Visitor	Score	Home	OT	Decision	Attendance	Record	Pts	Recap
38	January 2	Detroit	5–4	Columbus		Talbot	18,370	16–18–4	36
39	January 4	Detroit	4–2	Winnipeg		Lyon	14,527	17–18–4	38
40	January 7	Ottawa	2–3	Detroit	OT	Talbot	19,515	18–18–4	40
41	January 10	Chicago	3–5	Detroit		Talbot	19,515	19–18–4	42
42	January 12	Seattle	2–6	Detroit		Talbot	19,515	20–18–4	44
43	January 14	San Jose	6–3	Detroit		Husso	19,515	20–19–4	44
44	January 16	Detroit	5–2	Florida		Talbot	19,486	21–19–4	46
45	January 18	Detroit	1–5	Tampa Bay		Talbot	19,092	21–20–4	46
46	January 19	Detroit	1–4	Dallas		Lyon	18,532	21–21–4	46
47	January 21	Detroit	1–2	Philadelphia	OT	Lyon	17,635	21–21–5	47
48	January 23	Montreal	2–4	Detroit		Talbot	19,515	22–21–5	49
49	January 25	Tampa Bay	0–2	Detroit		Talbot	19,515	23–21–5	51
50	January 27	Los Angeles	2–5	Detroit		Talbot	17,450	24–21–5	53
51	January 30	Detroit	3–2	Edmonton	SO	Lyon	18,347	25–21–5	55

February: 5–2–1 (Home: 1–2–1; Road: 4–0–0)
#	Date	Visitor	Score	Home	OT	Decision	Attendance	Record	Pts	Recap
52	February 1	Detroit	3–1	Calgary		Talbot	17,707	26–21–5	57
53	February 2	Detroit	3–2	Vancouver	OT	Lyon	18,872	27–21–5	59
54	February 4	Detroit	5–4	Seattle	SO	Talbot	17,151	28–21–5	61
55	February 8	Tampa Bay	6–3	Detroit		Talbot	19,515	28–22–5	61
56	February 22	Minnesota	4–3	Detroit	OT	Talbot	19,515	28–22–6	62
57	February 23	Anaheim	4–5	Detroit	OT	Lyon	19,515	29–22–6	64
58	February 25	Detroit	3–2	Minnesota		Talbot	18,618	30–22–6	66
59	February 27	Columbus	5–2	Detroit		Talbot	19,515	30–23–6	66

March: 4–10–0 (Home: 3–3–0; Road: 1–7–0)
#	Date	Visitor	Score	Home	OT	Decision	Attendance	Record	Pts	Recap
60	March 1	Detroit	3–5	Columbus		Talbot	94,751 (outdoors)	30–24–6	66
61	March 4	Carolina	2–1	Detroit		Lyon	18,573	30–25–6	66
62	March 6	Utah	4–2	Detroit		Lyon	19,515	30–26–6	66
63	March 7	Detroit	2–5	Washington		Talbot	18,573	30–27–6	66
64	March 10	Detroit	1–2	Ottawa		Talbot	18,651	30–28–6	66
65	March 12	Buffalo	3–7	Detroit		Mrazek	18,885	31–28–6	68
66	March 14	Detroit	2–4	Carolina		Mrazek	18,845	31–29–6	68
67	March 16	Vegas	0–3	Detroit		Mrazek	19,515	32–29–6	70
68	March 18	Detroit	1–4	Washington		Mrazek	18,573	32–30–6	70
69	March 22	Detroit	3–6	Vegas		Talbot	18,348	32–31–6	70
70	March 24	Detroit	5–1	Utah		Lyon	11,131	33–31–6	72
71	March 25	Detroit	2–5	Colorado		Lyon	18,101	33–32–6	72
72	March 27	Ottawa	4–3	Detroit		Talbot	19,515	33–33–6	72
73	March 29	Boston	1–2	Detroit		Talbot	19,515	34–33–6	74

April: 5–2–2 (Home: 3–0–0; Road: 2–2–2)
#	Date	Visitor	Score	Home	OT	Decision	Attendance	Record	Pts	Recap
74	April 1	Detroit	1–2	St. Louis	OT	Talbot	18,096	34–33–7	75
75	April 4	Carolina	3–5	Detroit		Talbot	18,972	35–33–7	77
76	April 6	Florida	1–2	Detroit		Talbot	19,515	36–33–7	79
77	April 8	Detroit	1–4	Montreal		Talbot	21,105	36–34–7	79
78	April 10	Detroit	1–4	Florida		Talbot	19,448	36–35–7	79
79	April 11	Detroit	4–3	Tampa Bay	OT	Lyon	19,092	37–35–7	81
80	April 14	Dallas	4–6	Detroit		Talbot	18,669	38–35–7	83
81	April 16	Detroit	5–2	New Jersey		Lyon	16,514	39–35–7	85
82	April 17	Detroit	3–4	Toronto	OT	Talbot	18,605	39–35–8	86

Legend: Win (2 points) Loss (0 points) Overtime/shootout loss (1 point)

== Player statistics ==
Stats updated as of April 17, 2025

=== Skaters ===
Regular season
Player	GP	G	A	Pts	+/−	PIM
Lucas Raymond	82	27	53	80	–15	18
Alex DeBrincat	82	39	31	70	–13	29
Dylan Larkin	82	30	40	70	–16	40
Patrick Kane	72	21	38	59	–16	12
Moritz Seider	82	8	38	46	–5	40
Marco Kasper	77	19	18	37	1	34
Vladimir Tarasenko	80	11	22	33	–13	6
J. T. Compher	76	11	21	32	–7	24
Simon Edvinsson	78	7	24	31	12	67
Jonatan Berggren	75	12	12	24	–13	14
Andrew Copp	56	10	13	23	4	8
Michael Rasmussen	77	11	10	21	–12	24
Erik Gustafsson	60	2	16	18	–19	20
Ben Chiarot	81	4	9	13	–14	69
Elmer Soderblom	26	4	7	11	2	6
Joe Veleno^{‡}	56	5	5	10	–14	13
Tyler Motte	55	4	5	9	–11	6
Albert Johansson	61	3	6	9	–11	30
Justin Holl	73	2	6	8	–7	16
Jeff Petry	44	1	7	8	–2	16
Christian Fischer^{‡}	45	1	6	7	–5	11
Austin Watson	13	3	0	3	1	17
Craig Smith^{†}	19	0	2	2	–2	6
William Lagesson	7	0	1	1	–1	4
Dominik Shine	9	0	1	1	–1	15
Olli Maatta^{‡}	7	0	0	0	0	0
Carter Mazur	1	0	0	0	0	0

=== Goaltenders ===
Regular season
Player	GP	GS	TOI	W	L	OT	GA	GAA	SA	SV%	SO	G	A	PIM
Cam Talbot	47	43	2642:10	21	19	5	129	2.93	1,295	.901	2	0	0	0
Alex Lyon	30	26	1559:38	14	9	1	50	2.81	705	.896	1	0	0	2
Petr Mrazek^{†}	5	5	240:35	2	2	0	10	3.69	102	.902	1	0	0	0
Ville Husso^{‡}	9	8	438:49	1	5	2	27	3.69	202	.866	0	0	0	0
Sebastian Cossa	1	0	45	1	0	0	2	2.67	14	.857	0	0	0	0

^{†}Denotes player spent time with another team before joining the Red Wings. Stats reflect time with the Red Wings only.
^{‡}Denotes player was traded mid-season. Stats reflect time with the Red Wings only.

== Awards and honours ==
=== Milestones ===
Regular season
Player	Milestone	Reached
Albert Johansson	1st career NHL game	October 12, 2024
Marco Kasper	1st career NHL point 1st career NHL goal	November 15, 2024
Sebastian Cossa	1st career NHL game 1st career NHL win	December 9, 2024
Patrick Kane	1,300th career NHL point	December 29, 2024
Dominik Shine	1st career NHL game	January 27, 2025

== Transactions ==
The Red Wings have been involved in the following transactions during the 2024–25 season.

=== Trades ===
Date	Details		Ref
June 25, 2024	To Nashville Predators Andrew Gibson	To Detroit Red Wings 2nd-round pick in 2024; Jesse Kiiskinen	
June 25, 2024	To San Jose Sharks 2nd-round pick in 2024; Jake Walman	To Detroit Red Wings Future considerations	
July 3, 2024	To Anaheim Ducks Robby Fabbri; Conditional 4th-round pick in 2025	To Detroit Red Wings Gage Alexander	
October 30, 2024	To Utah Hockey Club Olli Määttä	To Detroit Red Wings 3rd-round pick in 2025	
February 24, 2025	To Anaheim Ducks Ville Husso	To Detroit Red Wings Future considerations	
March 7, 2025	To Chicago Blackhawks Joe Veleno	To Detroit Red Wings Petr Mrázek; Craig Smith	
March 14, 2025	To New Jersey Devils Tory Dello	To Detroit Red Wings Future considerations	

=== Free agents ===
Date	Player	Team	Contract term	Ref
July 1, 2024	David Perron	to Ottawa Senators	2-year	
July 1, 2024	William Lagesson	from Anaheim Ducks	1-year	
July 1, 2024	Cam Talbot	from Los Angeles Kings	2-year	
July 1, 2024	Zach Aston-Reese	to Vegas Golden Knights	1-year	
July 1, 2024	Erik Gustafsson	from New York Rangers	2-year	
July 1, 2024	Sheldon Dries	from Vancouver Canucks	2-year	
July 1, 2024	Jack Campbell	from Edmonton Oilers	1-year	
July 1, 2024	Shayne Gostisbehere	to Carolina Hurricanes	3-year	
July 2, 2024	Chase Bradley	to Colorado Avalanche	2-year	
July 2, 2024	Joe Snively	from Washington Capitals	1-year	
July 2, 2024	James Reimer	to Buffalo Sabres	1-year	
July 2, 2024	Tyler Motte	from Tampa Bay Lightning	1-year	
July 3, 2024	Vladimir Tarasenko	from Florida Panthers	2-year	
July 4, 2024	Tony Dello	from Chicago Wolves	1-year	

=== Signings ===
Date	Player	Contract term	Ref
June 30, 2024	Patrick Kane	1-year	
July 11, 2024	Michael Brandsegg-Nygård	3-year	
March 13, 2025	Anton Johansson	3-year	
March 21, 2025	Eduards Tralmaks	1-year	

== Draft picks ==
Below are the Detroit Red Wings' selections at the 2024 NHL entry draft, which was held on June 28 and 29, 2024, at the Sphere in Las Vegas, Nevada.

Round	#	Player	Pos	Nationality	College/Junior/Club Team (League)
1	15	Michael Brandsegg-Nygård	RW	Norway	Skellefteå AIK (SHL)
2	47	Max Plante	LW	United States	U.S. NTDP (USHL)
3	80	Ondrej Becher	C	Czechia	Prince George Cougars (WHL)
4	126^{1}	Landon Miller	G	Canada	Sault Ste. Marie Greyhounds (OHL)
5	144	John Whipple	D	United States	U.S. NTDP (USHL)
6	176	Charlie Forslund	LW	Sweden	Falu IF (Hockeyettan)
7	203^{2}	Austin Baker	LW	United States	U.S. NTDP (USHL)
7	208	Fisher Scott	D	United States	Dubuque Fighting Saints (USHL)

Notes:

1. The Dallas Stars' fourth-round pick went to the Detroit Red Wings as the result of a trade on March 21, 2022, that sent Vladislav Namestnikov to Dallas in exchange for this pick.
2. The New Jersey Devils' seventh-round pick went to the Detroit Red Wings as the result of a trade on March 8, 2024, that sent Klim Kostin to San Jose in exchange for Radim Simek and this pick.
