= Eetu Luostarinen =

Finnish ice hockey player (born 1998)

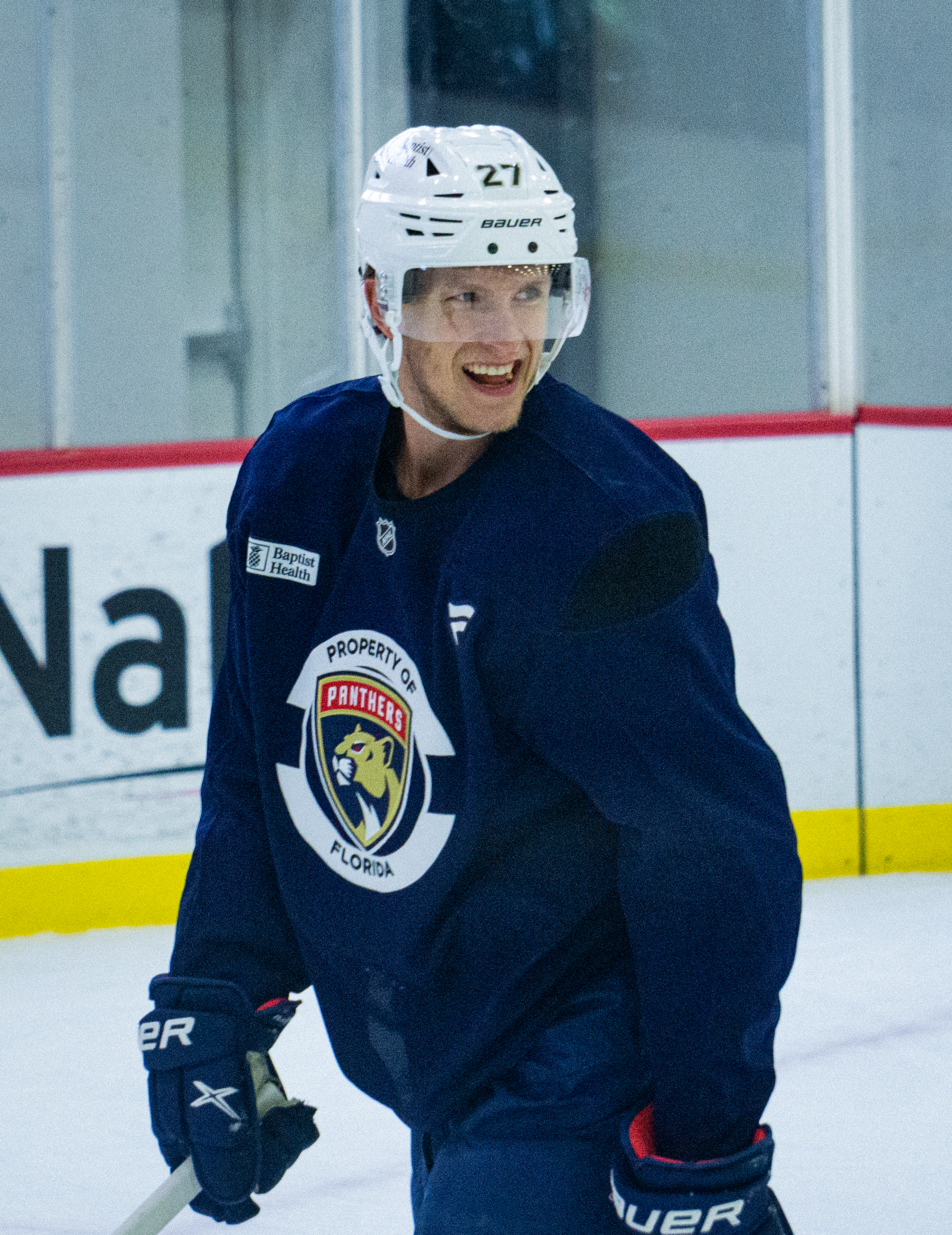
- Luostarinen with the Panthers in 2024
- Born: 2 September 1998 (age 28) Siilinjärvi, Finland
- Height: 6 ft 3 in (191 cm)
- Weight: 190 lb (86 kg; 13 st 8 lb)
- Position: Centre
- Shoots: Left
- NHL team Former teams: Florida Panthers; KalPa; Carolina Hurricanes
- National team: Finland
- NHL draft: 42nd overall, 2017; Carolina Hurricanes
- Playing career: 2016–present

Eetu Luostarinen (born 2 September 1998) is a Finnish professional ice hockey player who is a centre for the Florida Panthers of the National Hockey League (NHL). He was drafted in the second round, 42nd overall, by the Carolina Hurricanes in the 2017 NHL entry draft. Luostarinen won back-to-back Stanley Cups with the Panthers in 2024 and 2025.

== Playing career ==
Luostarinen began playing for KalPa after previously spending time in their junior teams, making his professional debut in the 2016–17 Liiga season. During his rookie season, on 4 January 2017, Luostarinen was signed to a three-year extension to remain with KalPa through 2020.

In the 2018–19 season, Luostarinen ranked tied for first in goals with 15 and finished second for KalPa with 36 points in 54 regular season games.

On 30 May 2019, Luostarinen left KalPa using his NHL out-clause to sign a three-year, entry-level contract with the Carolina Hurricanes.

In the 2019–20 season, Luostarinen began his first North American season with the Hurricanes AHL affiliate, the Charlotte Checkers. Showing early offensive potential with 7 points in 10 games, Luostarinen received his first recall to Carolina on 7 November 2019. He made his NHL debut with the Hurricanes that day in a 4–2 defeat to the New York Rangers at the PNC Arena. He registered his first point, an assist, in his third game during a 8–2 victory over the Ottawa Senators on 11 November 2019. After 8 games with the Hurricanes, Luostarinen was returned to continue his season with the Checkers.

On 24 February, at the NHL trade deadline, Luostarinen was traded by the Hurricanes along with Erik Haula, Lucas Wallmark and Chase Priskie to the Florida Panthers in exchange for Vincent Trocheck on 24 February 2020. He was immediately reassigned to AHL affiliate, the Springfield Thunderbirds.

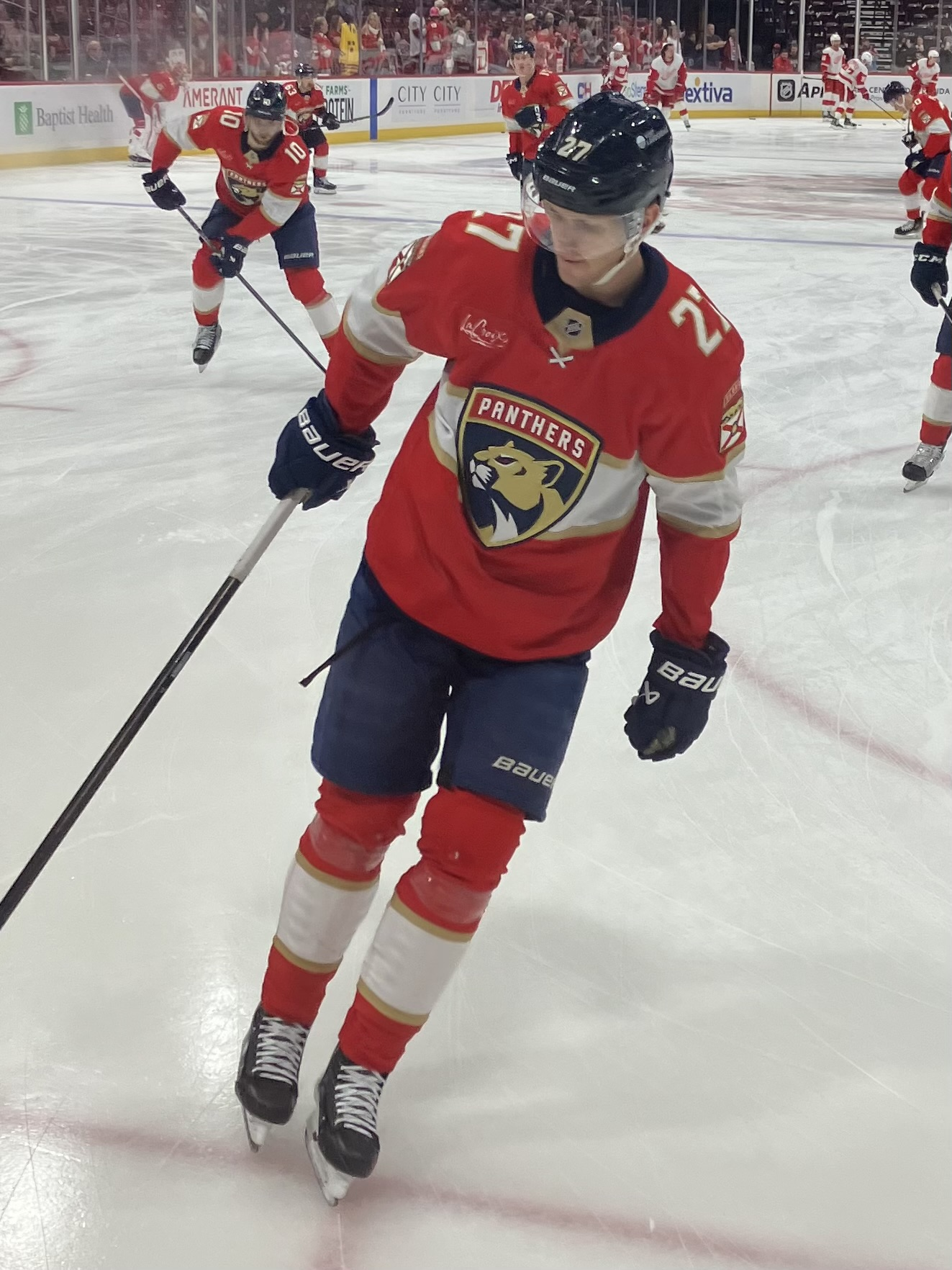
Luostarinen with the Panthers in April 2025

On 18 August 2020, Luostarinen agreed to return to former Liiga club KalPa on loan until the commencement of the delayed 2020–21 North American season.

On 17 January 2021, Luostarinen scored his first NHL goal, as well as his first multi-point game against Collin Delia of the Chicago Blackhawks, which broke a 2–2 tie and proved to be the game winner. In his first season with the Panthers, he recorded 3 goals and 5 assists in 44 games, and did not play during the Panthers first round series against the Tampa Bay Lightning.

During the 2021–22 season, Luostarinen scored his first career overtime goal against Washington Capitals goaltender Vitek Veněček. In the 2022 Stanley Cup playoffs, he played all 10 games for the panthers scoring 1 goal and 1 assist. On 8 July 2022, Luostarinen signed a two-year, $3 million contract with the Panthers.

In the 2022–23 season, Luostarinen had a career high 17 goals and 26 assists for 43 points, playing all 82 games and added 2 goals and 3 assists in 16 playoff games, with a multi-point playoff game against the Boston Bruins. He would miss the Stanley Cup Final with a broken tibia, suffered during game 4 of the conference final against Carolina. On 25 July 2023, Luostarinen signed a three-year, $9 million contract extension to stay with the Panthers.

On 30 December 2023, Luostarinen recorded his first career multi-goal game against the Montreal Canadiens. Scoring 12 goals and 15 assists in 82 games, he added another 2 goals and 6 assists in 24 playoff games en route to his, and the Panthers, first Stanley Cup on 24 June 2024.

In the 2024–25 season, Luostarinen scored 9 goals and 15 assists in 80 games. After the trade deadline, with the Panthers acquisition of Brad Marchand, would end up on a line with Marchand and Anton Lundell. Throughout the playoffs, this line continued to produce, in which Luostarinen recorded a 4-point game in the series clincher vs the Lightning. On 17 June 2025, he won the Stanley Cup for the second time, assisting on the series winning goal.

On 1 July 2026, Luostarinen signed an eight-year, $40 million extension beginning in the 2027–28 season with the Panthers.

== International play ==
Medal record

Men's ice hockey

Representing Finland

Winter Olympics
| Bronze medal – third place | 2026 Milano Cortina | |

World Championships
| Gold medal – first place | 2019 Slovakia | |

He represented Finland at the 2026 Winter Olympics and won a bronze medal.

== Career statistics ==
=== Regular season and playoffs ===
| | | | Regular season | | | | | Playoffs |
| Season | Team | League | GP | G | A | Pts | PIM | GP | G | A | Pts | PIM |
|---|---|---|---|---|---|---|---|---|---|---|---|---|
| 2014–15 | KalPa | FIN U18 | 18 | 7 | 4 | 11 | 4 | — | — | — | — | — |
| 2015–16 | KalPa | FIN U18 | 46 | 11 | 23 | 34 | 58 | 2 | 2 | 0 | 2 | 12 |
| 2016–17 | KalPa | FIN U20 | 23 | 11 | 8 | 19 | 49 | — | — | — | — | — |
| 2016–17 | KalPa | Liiga | 32 | 3 | 4 | 7 | 14 | 17 | 1 | 2 | 3 | 14 |
| 2017–18 | KalPa | Liiga | 55 | 6 | 14 | 20 | 58 | 6 | 1 | 2 | 3 | 4 |
| 2017–18 | KalPa | FIN U20 | — | — | — | — | — | 3 | 1 | 2 | 3 | 25 |
| 2018–19 | KalPa | Liiga | 54 | 15 | 21 | 36 | 79 | — | — | — | — | — |
| 2019–20 | Charlotte Checkers | AHL | 44 | 8 | 17 | 25 | 24 | — | — | — | — | — |
| 2019–20 | Carolina Hurricanes | NHL | 8 | 0 | 1 | 1 | 0 | — | — | — | — | — |
| 2019–20 | Springfield Thunderbirds | AHL | 5 | 0 | 0 | 0 | 0 | — | — | — | — | — |
| 2020–21 | KalPa | Liiga | 17 | 5 | 10 | 15 | 14 | — | — | — | — | — |
| 2020–21 | Florida Panthers | NHL | 44 | 3 | 5 | 8 | 12 | — | — | — | — | — |
| 2021–22 | Florida Panthers | NHL | 78 | 9 | 17 | 26 | 12 | 10 | 1 | 1 | 2 | 2 |
| 2022–23 | Florida Panthers | NHL | 82 | 17 | 26 | 43 | 28 | 16 | 2 | 3 | 5 | 4 |
| 2023–24 | Florida Panthers | NHL | 82 | 12 | 15 | 27 | 26 | 24 | 2 | 6 | 8 | 22 |
| 2024–25 | Florida Panthers | NHL | 80 | 9 | 15 | 24 | 28 | 23 | 5 | 14 | 19 | 25 |
| 2025–26 | Florida Panthers | NHL | 73 | 11 | 22 | 33 | 32 | — | — | — | — | — |
| Liiga totals | | | 158 | 29 | 49 | 78 | 165 | 23 | 2 | 4 | 6 | 18 |
| NHL totals | | | 447 | 61 | 101 | 162 | 138 | 73 | 10 | 24 | 34 | 53 |

=== International ===
| Year | Team | Event | Result | GP | G | A | Pts | PIM |
|---|---|---|---|---|---|---|---|---|
| 2019 | Finland | WC | 1st place, gold medalist(s) | 4 | 0 | 0 | 0 | 2 |
| 2025 | Finland | 4NF | 4th | 3 | 0 | 1 | 1 | 0 |
| 2026 | Finland | OG | 3rd place, bronze medalist(s) | 6 | 0 | 4 | 4 | 2 |
| Senior totals | | | | 13 | 0 | 5 | 5 | 4 |

== Awards and honours ==
| Award | Year | Ref |
|---|---|---|
| Stanley Cup champion | 2024, 2025 | |
