= Carter Verhaeghe =

Canadian ice hockey player (born 1995)

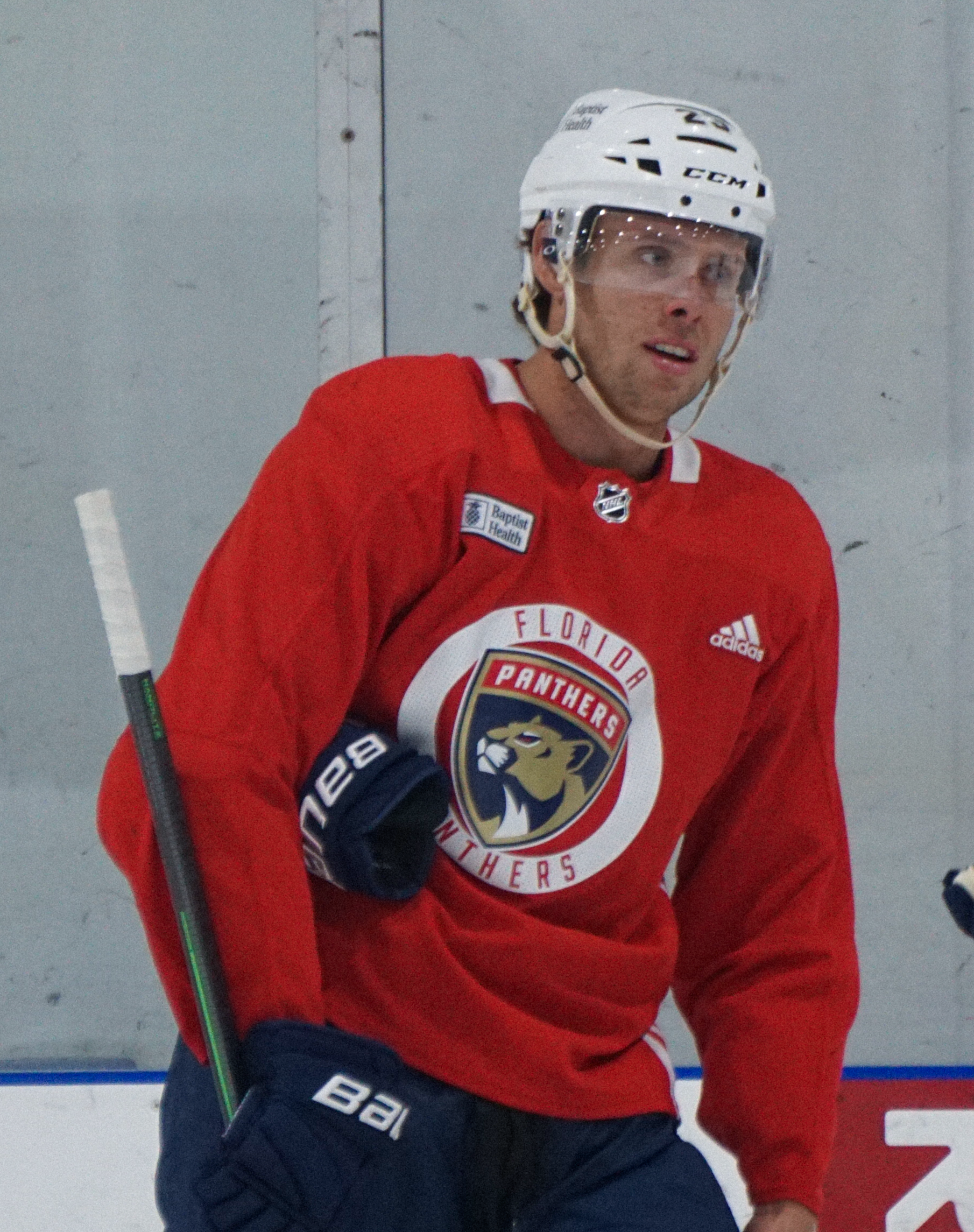
- Verhaeghe with the Florida Panthers in September 2023
- Born: August 14, 1995 (age 31) Waterdown, Ontario, Canada
- Height: 6 ft 2 in (188 cm)
- Weight: 183 lb (83 kg; 13 st 1 lb)
- Position: Forward
- Shoots: Left
- NHL team Former teams: Florida Panthers; Tampa Bay Lightning
- NHL draft: 82nd overall, 2013; Toronto Maple Leafs
- Playing career: 2014–present

Carter Verhaeghe (/vərˈheɪɡiː/ vər-HAY-ghee; born August 14, 1995) is a Canadian professional ice hockey player who is a forward for the Florida Panthers of the National Hockey League (NHL). He was drafted in the third round, 82nd overall in the 2013 NHL entry draft by the Toronto Maple Leafs. He played for the minor league affiliates of the Maple Leafs and New York Islanders, but did not play in the NHL until being traded to the Tampa Bay Lightning. Verhaeghe won the Stanley Cup as a member of the Lightning in 2020, after which he signed as a free agent with the Panthers. Verhaeghe won a second Stanley Cup with Florida in 2024, becoming the first player to win a Stanley Cup with both teams from the state of Florida. Verhaeghe won his third Stanley Cup and his second with the Panthers in 2025.

== Early life ==
Verhaeghe was born on August 14, 1995, in Waterdown, Ontario, Canada, to parents Thomas and Karen. His father introduced him to the sport of ice hockey and he credits both sets of parents for being an influence on his career. Once he began skating, Verhaeghe started playing organized hockey through the Flamborough Hockey Association before joining the Hamilton Junior Bulldogs and Halton Hurricanes. After his family briefly lived in Toronto, Verhaeghe became a fan of the Toronto Maple Leafs and Mats Sundin. Growing up, Verhaeghe and his sister Victoria played hockey, lacrosse, and soccer.

== Playing career ==
=== Junior ===
In his high school years, Verhaeghe competed with the St. Mary Catholic Secondary School Crusaders in the Hamilton-Wentworth Catholic league alongside future NHLer Mark Jankowski. Together, they helped the Crusaders clinch the 2010 Hamilton Junior Cup and Verhaeghe played with the senior team in grade 10. Verhaeghe also spent the 2010–11 minor midget season with the Hamilton Jr. Bulldogs of the South Central Triple-A Hockey League. Following that season, where he tallied 34 goals and 64 points through 45 games, Verhaeghe was drafted 38th overall in the 2011 OHL Priority Selection by the Niagara IceDogs.

Verhaeghe joined the IceDogs immediately following the draft and accumulated 16 points throughout the 2011–12 season. As he was playing on a strong team that finished first in the Eastern Conference, Verhaeghe saw limited playing time. He began the season with a scoring drought and he tallied his first career OHL goal in his 18th game of the season.

Following his second season with the IceDogs in 2012–13, posting 44 points in 67 games, Verhaeghe was selected in the third round, 82nd overall in the 2013 NHL entry draft by the Toronto Maple Leafs. At the conclusion of the 2013–14 season with the Ice Dogs, Verhaeghe was signed to a three-year, entry-level contract with the Maple Leafs on April 2, 2014. He immediately joined AHL affiliate, the Toronto Marlies, signing an amateur tryout contract to play out the remainder of their campaign.

Matching his scoring totals from his previous season with the IceDogs, Verhaeghe scored 82 points as captain in his final season of junior in the 2014–15 season.

=== Professional ===
==== Toronto Maple Leafs and New York Islanders organizations ====
Prior to his first professional season, Verhaeghe was included in a multi-player trade prior to training camp by the Maple Leafs to the New York Islanders in exchange for Michael Grabner on September 18, 2015. He split the following two seasons between the Islanders affiliates' the Bridgeport Sound Tigers of the AHL and Missouri Mavericks of the ECHL.

==== Tampa Bay Lightning ====
With one year remaining on his entry-level contract, Verhaeghe was traded by the Islanders to the Tampa Bay Lightning in exchange for Kristers Gudļevskis on July 1, 2017. In the 2017–18 season with the Syracuse Crunch, Verhaeghe in his first full year in the AHL, secured a top six scoring role scoring a breakout 48 points in 58 games.

In the following 2018–19 season, Verhaeghe captured the first AHL scoring title ever by a Crunch skater, claiming the John B. Sollenberger Trophy with 82 points in 76 games. His 34 goals tied Crunch teammate Alex Barré-Boulet in league scoring to share the Willie Marshall Award. Verhaeghe holds the Crunch's single-season total point record with 82 points.

On July 5, 2019, Verhaeghe was signed to a one-year, two-way contract extension with the Lightning. On September 30, the Lightning announced that Verhaeghe had made the team's opening night roster. On October 3, Verhaeghe appeared in his first career NHL game, which came in a 5–2 Lightning win over the visiting Florida Panthers at Amalie Arena. October 5, Verhaeghe recorded his first career NHL assist and point in a 4–3 loss to the Panthers at BB&T Center. On December 7, Verhaeghe recorded his first career NHL goal and first career multi-point game in a 7–1 Lightning win over the visiting San Jose Sharks at Amalie Arena. He scored his first NHL hat trick on January 7, 2020, in a 9–2 win over the Vancouver Canucks.

On August 15, 2020, Verhaeghe skated in his first career NHL playoff game. In that game Verhaeghe recorded his first career playoff assist and point. Tampa would go on to win the Stanley Cup, defeating the Dallas Stars in six games, and Verhaeghe became the second Sound Tigers player to win the Stanley Cup.

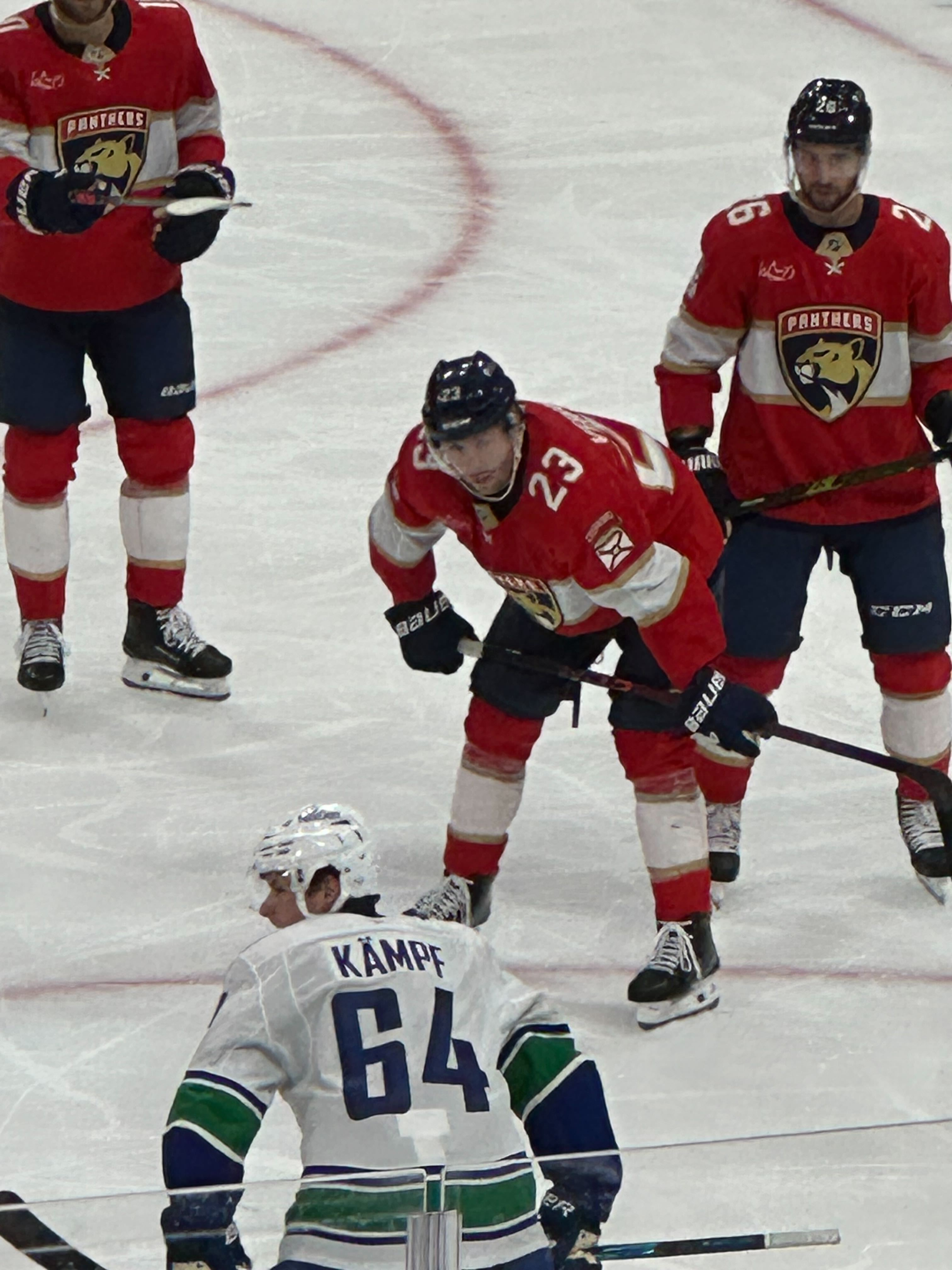
Carter Verhaeghe waits for the faceoff in a game against the Vancouver Canucks in November 2025

==== Florida Panthers ====
Shortly after claiming the Stanley Cup, as an impending restricted free agent with arbitration rights and due to salary cap constraints, Verhaeghe was not tendered a qualifying offer by the Lightning and was released to explore free agency. On October 9, 2020, Verhaeghe remained in Florida, agreeing to a two-year contract with the Florida Panthers.

In the shortened 2020–21 season, Verhaeghe had a breakout year, scoring 36 points in 43 games with a plus-24 rating. He signed a three-year contract extension with the Panthers on July 31, 2021.

Verhaeghe earned a reputation as a clutch player for the Panthers. He has scored five playoff overtime goals, tied for third all-time in NHL history, and 13 playoff game-winning goals in his career, which is second all-time among active players. During the 2022 playoffs, Verhaeghe scored a team-leading 12 points, including an overtime goal in game six of the first round series against the Washington Capitals to give the Panthers their first playoff series win since 1996. The following year, Verhaeghe scored the series-winning goal in overtime of game seven in their first round series against the Presidents' Trophy–winning Boston Bruins.

Verhaeghe won his second Stanley Cup when the Panthers defeated the Edmonton Oilers in the 2024 Stanley Cup Final.

On October 8, 2024, Verhaeghe signed an eight-year contract extension with the Panthers. In the 2024–25 season, he recorded 20 goals and 33 assists for 53 points during regular season and helped the Panthers win the Stanley Cup for the second straight year in the 2025 Stanley Cup Final where Florida once again played against and defeated the Edmonton Oilers.

== Career statistics ==
=== Regular season and playoffs ===
			Regular season					Playoffs
Season	Team	League	GP	G	A	Pts	PIM	GP	G	A	Pts	PIM
2011–12	Niagara IceDogs	OHL	62	4	12	16	10	19	1	2	3	2
2012–13	Niagara IceDogs	OHL	67	18	26	44	22	5	2	2	4	6
2013–14	Niagara IceDogs	OHL	65	28	54	82	60	6	2	2	4	6
2013–14	Toronto Marlies	AHL	2	0	1	1	0	—	—	—	—	—
2014–15	Niagara IceDogs	OHL	68	33	49	82	38	11	6	8	14	4
2015–16	Bridgeport Sound Tigers	AHL	30	6	9	15	6	—	—	—	—	—
2015–16	Missouri Mavericks	ECHL	20	8	17	25	2	10	2	9	11	2
2016–17	Bridgeport Sound Tigers	AHL	45	16	13	29	20	—	—	—	—	—
2016–17	Missouri Mavericks	ECHL	16	12	20	32	4	—	—	—	—	—
2017–18	Syracuse Crunch	AHL	58	17	31	48	30	7	1	7	8	0
2018–19	Syracuse Crunch	AHL	76	34	48	82	34	4	1	5	6	2
2019–20	Tampa Bay Lightning	NHL	52	9	4	13	8	8	0	2	2	2
2020–21	Florida Panthers	NHL	43	18	18	36	31	6	2	1	3	2
2021–22	Florida Panthers	NHL	78	24	31	55	48	10	6	6	12	4
2022–23	Florida Panthers	NHL	81	42	31	73	46	21	7	10	17	8
2023–24	Florida Panthers	NHL	76	34	38	72	36	24	11	10	21	20
2024–25	Florida Panthers	NHL	81	20	33	53	46	23	7	16	23	6
2025–26	Florida Panthers	NHL	77	25	30	55	32	—	—	—	—	—
NHL totals			488	172	185	357	247	92	33	43	78	42

=== International ===
Year	Team	Event	Result	GP	G	A	Pts	PIM
2013	Canada	U18	1st place, gold medalist(s)	7	0	4	4	4
Junior totals				7	0	4	4	4

== Awards and honours ==
Award	Year	Ref
AHL
First All-Star Team	2019	
John B. Sollenberger Trophy	2019	
Willie Marshall Award	2019	
NHL
Stanley Cup champion	2020, 2024, 2025	
