= Tomáš Nosek =

Czech ice hockey player (born 1992)

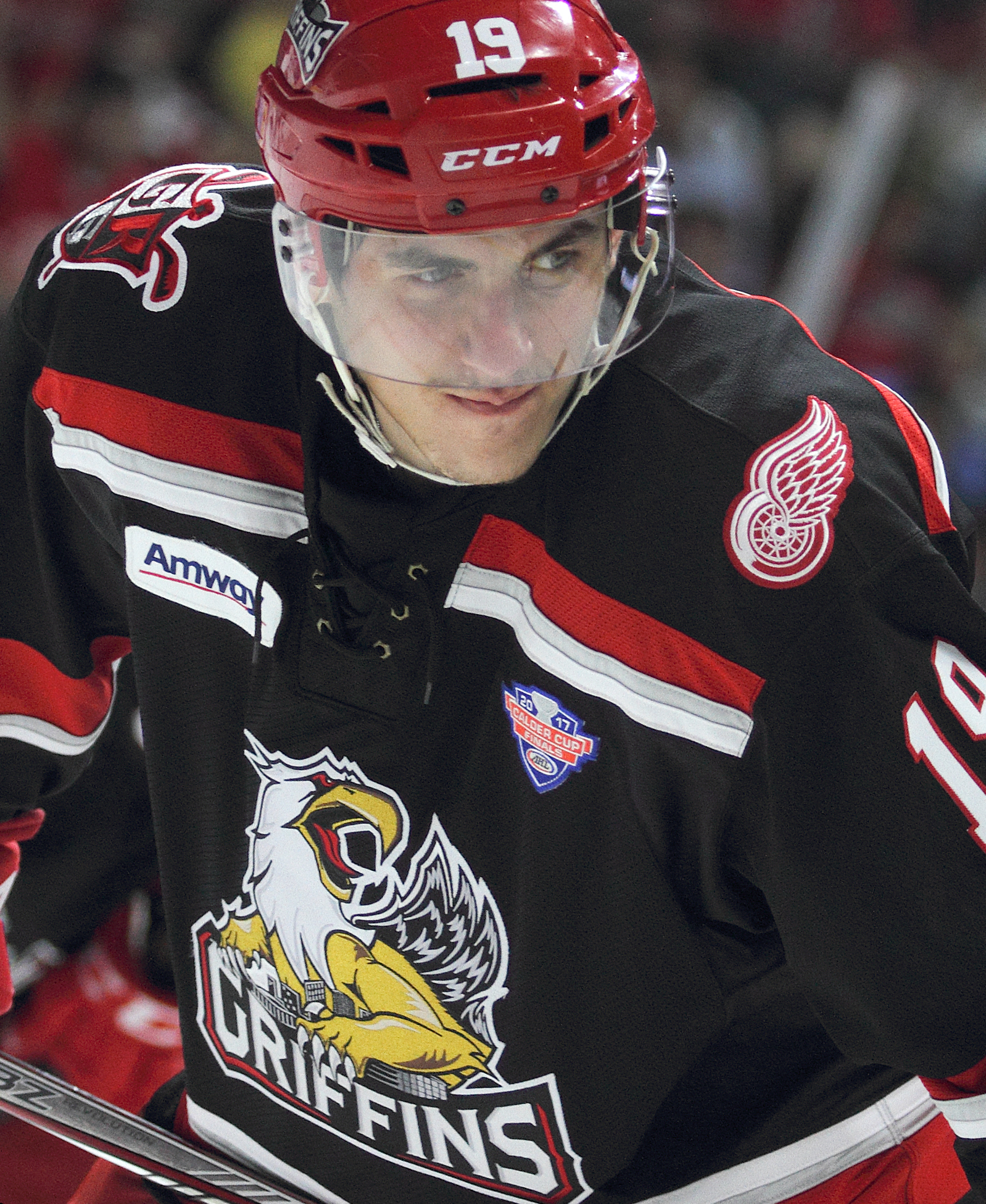
- Nosek with the Grand Rapids Griffins in 2017
- Born: 1 September 1992 (age 34) Pardubice, Czechoslovakia
- Height: 6 ft 2 in (188 cm)
- Weight: 210 lb (95 kg; 15 st 0 lb)
- Position: Forward
- Shoots: Left
- ELH team Former teams: HC Dynamo Pardubice; Detroit Red Wings; Vegas Golden Knights; Boston Bruins; New Jersey Devils; Florida Panthers
- National team: Czech Republic
- NHL draft: Undrafted
- Playing career: 2011–present

Tomáš Nosek (born 1 September 1992) is a Czech professional ice hockey player who is a forward and currently plays for HC Dynamo Pardubice of the Czech Extraliga (ELH). Nosek began his professional career with Pardubice before signing with the Detroit Red Wings of the National Hockey League (NHL) as an undrafted free agent in 2014. After developing in the American Hockey League (AHL) with the Grand Rapids Griffins, he played a key role in their 2017 Calder Cup championship run.

Nosek was later selected by the Vegas Golden Knights in the 2017 NHL expansion draft, becoming part of the team's inaugural roster and contributing to their 2018 Stanley Cup Final appearance in their first season. After four seasons in Vegas, he signed with the Boston Bruins in 2021, where he played for two seasons before joining the New Jersey Devils in 2023. He was signed as a free agent by the Florida Panthers in 2024, with whom he won the Stanley Cup in 2025.

== Playing career ==
=== Junior ===
Prior to turning professional, Nosek recorded 53 goals and 72 assists in 109 games at the under-20 level for HC Pardubice and 27 goals and 36 assists in 67 games at the under-18 circuit.

Nosek has appeared in 129 games in the Czech Republic's top league since 2011–12, totaling 62 points, including 24 goals and 38 assists, and helping his club capture the league championship during his rookie season.

During the 2012–13 season, Nosek recorded five goals and nine assists in 50 games with the team, adding four goals and one assist in five games with Královští Lvi in the 1st Czech National Hockey League and five goals and nine assists in just six games with HC Pardubice's under-20 team.

During the 2013–14 season, in his third season for HC Pardubice, Nosek lead the team in scoring with 19 goals and 25 assists in 52 games. In addition to leading the team in goals and assists, Nosek had a club-best plus-17 rating and contributed three goals and three assists in 10 postseason appearances.

=== Professional ===
==== Detroit Red Wings ====
During the 2014–15 season, Nosek recorded 11 goals and 23 assists in 55 games for the Grand Rapids Griffins. He was tied with teammate Nick Jensen for the league lead with a plus-30 rating despite being limited to 55 games due to injury. During the Calder Cup playoffs, he recorded two goals and five assists in 12 games.

On 14 June 2014, Nosek signed a two-year, entry-level contract with the Detroit Red Wings.

On 19 December 2015, Nosek was recalled by the Red Wings. Prior to being recalled, he recorded two goals and five assists in 25 games with the Griffins. He made his NHL debut for the Red Wings on 26 December in a game against the Nashville Predators. He was assigned to the Griffins on 5 January 2016. In six games for the Red Wings, he registered two penalty minutes, six hits and three takeaways while averaging 10:08 time on ice during his first NHL call-up.

On 27 May 2016, Nosek signed a two-year contract extension with the Red Wings. On 18 March 2017, Nosek was recalled by the Red Wings. Prior to being recalled, Nosek recorded 15 goals and 24 assists in 48 games with the Griffins. Following the conclusion of the Red Wings season, Nosek was assigned to the Griffins. Nosek appeared in 11 games for the Red Wings, and recorded his first career NHL goal on 28 March against Cam Ward of the Carolina Hurricanes. During the 2016–17 season, Nosek recorded 15 goals and 26 assists in 51 games during the regular season. During the 2017 Calder Cup playoffs, he was the team's leading scorer recording 10 goals and 12 assists in 19 games, to help lead the Griffins to the Calder Cup championship.

==== Vegas Golden Knights ====
On 21 June 2017, Nosek was selected by the Vegas Golden Knights in the 2017 NHL Expansion Draft. On 10 October 2017, Nosek scored the Knights' first franchise goal on home ice at the T-Mobile Arena. The Knights qualified for the 2018 Stanley Cup playoffs, where Nosek scored his first career playoff goal on 18 May 2018, against the Winnipeg Jets. As a restricted free agent, Nosek signed a one-year, $962,500 contract with the Golden Knights on 18 July.

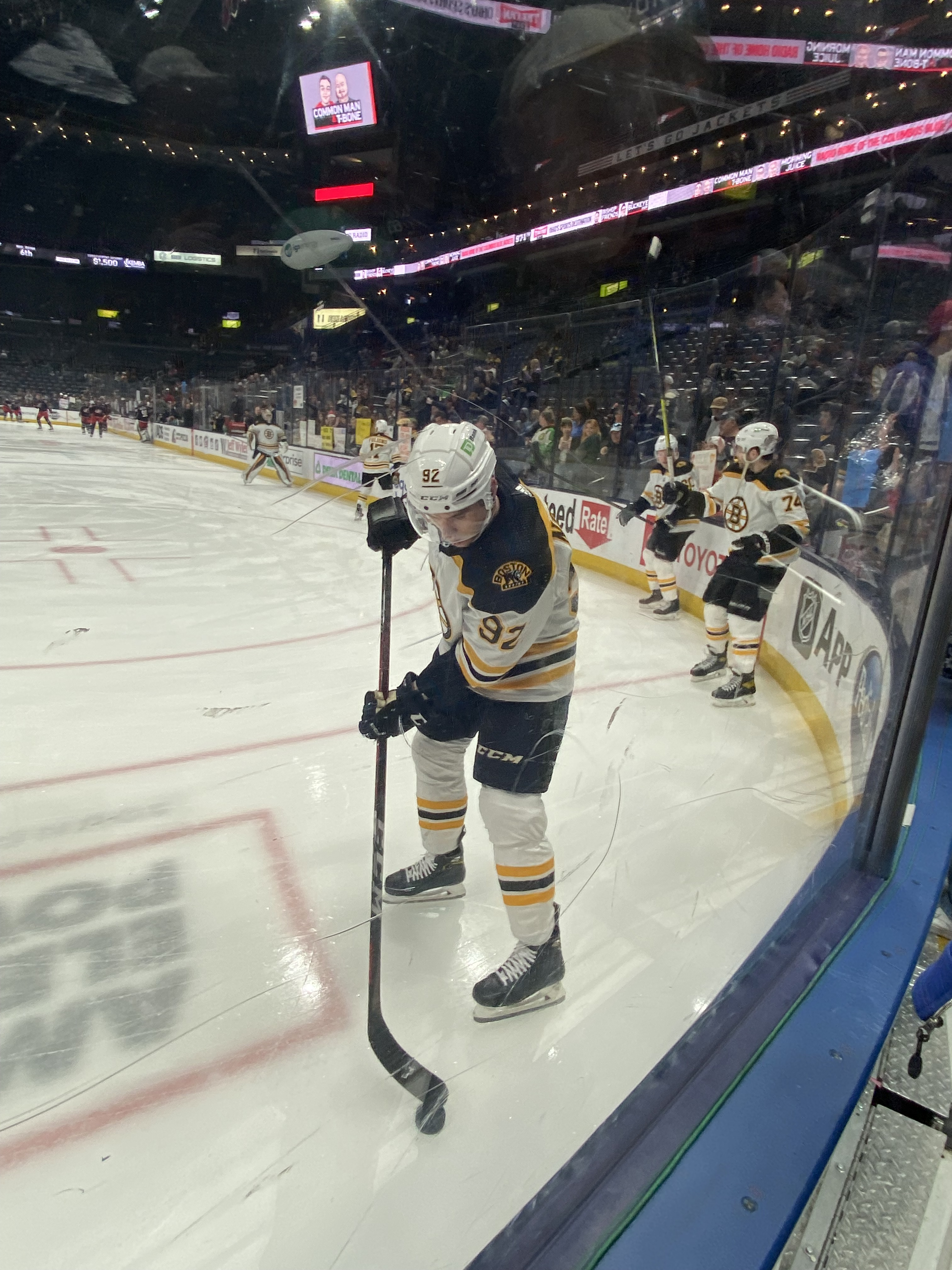
Nosek warming up as a member of the Bruins

On 1 July 2019, Nosek re-signed with the Golden Knights on a one-year, $1 million deal.

==== Boston Bruins ====
After four years as an original member of the Golden Knights, Nosek left as a free agent following the 2020–21 season. On 28 July 2021, Nosek was signed by the Boston Bruins to a two-year, $3.5 million contract. Nosek scored his first goal as a Bruin on 22 October 2021, in a 4–1 victory over the Buffalo Sabres.

In the 2022–23 season, Nosek settled in as a fourth line center for the Bruins. He was a consistent presence in the lineup, and tied his career high 18 points in a historic Bruins season which saw them break the regular season record for both wins and points. However, this success would not extend into the playoffs as they lost to the Florida Panthers in seven games in the first round of the 2023 Stanley Cup playoffs. Nosek would play in all seven games, scoring two assists.

==== New Jersey Devils ====
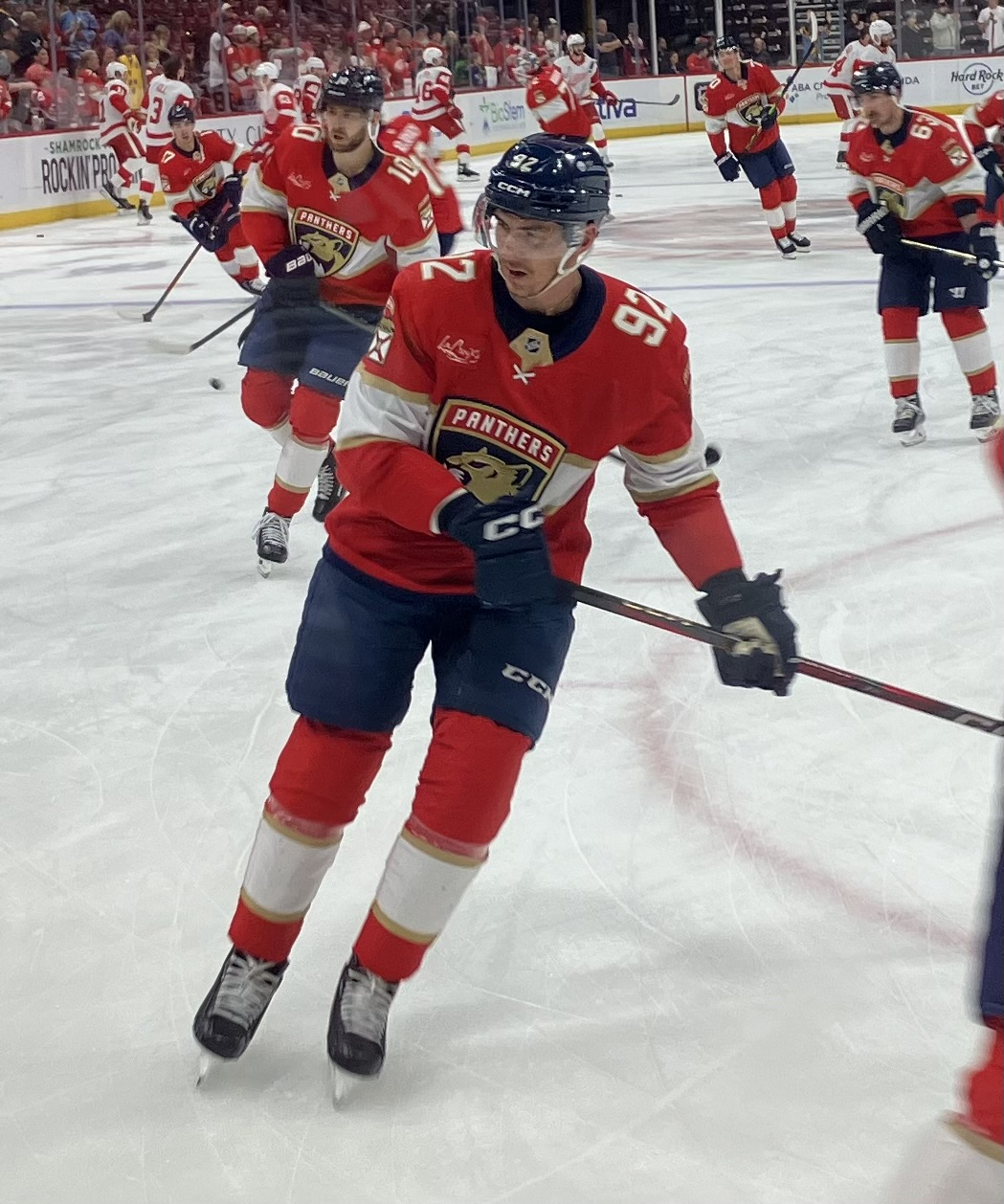
Nosek with the Panthers in 2025

As a free agent at the conclusion of his contract with the Bruins, Nosek was signed to a one-year, $1 million contract with the New Jersey Devils on 19 July 2023. Nosek injured his right foot in October 2023, missing games from 16 October to 7 November. He then suffered an upper body injury on 18 November. While recovering from this injury he reinjured his foot, for which he underwent surgery on 29 November. Nosek missed about two months due to the surgery, and returned to the lineup on 6 February 2024. Nosek would finally score his first goal and point as a Devil on 14 March, against the Dallas Stars. Nosek would finish out the season with the Devils without interruption, ending with two goals and four assists in 36 games.

==== Florida Panthers ====
Nosek as a free agent signed a one-year, $775,000 deal with the Florida Panthers on 1 July 2024.

In the 2025 Stanley Cup Playoffs, he played in the third game of the second round with the Florida Panthers trailing 0–2 in the series against the Toronto Maple Leafs. Panthers’ coach Paul Maurice would credit Nosek and his 4th line linemates Jonah Gadjovich and A. J. Greer as being instrumental in turning the series around. The Panthers would go on to win 4 of the next 5 to win that series and 12 of the next 16 overall to win the Stanley Cup with Nosek playing in each of those last 16 games. Nosek re-signed with the Panthers on July 1, 2025.

During the offseason, Nosek suffered a "significant" knee injury while training, with Panthers General Manager Bill Zito expecting him to miss several months including the beginning of the 2025–26 NHL season. The injury kept Nosek out until March, and he made his season debut with the Panthers on March 3, 2026, against the New Jersey Devils. Just a few games later, Nosek skated in his 500th career NHL game on March 17 against the Vancouver Canucks.

==== HC Dynamo Pardubice ====
On July 31, 2026, after 11 years in the NHL, Nosek returned to Pardubice of the Czech Extraliga.

== International play ==
Nosek represented the Czech Republic at the 2012 World Junior Ice Hockey Championships, where he served as team captain and recorded one assist in six games.

== Career statistics ==
=== Regular season and playoffs ===
| | | | Regular season | | | | | Playoffs |
| Season | Team | League | GP | G | A | Pts | PIM | GP | G | A | Pts | PIM |
|---|---|---|---|---|---|---|---|---|---|---|---|---|
| 2007–08 | HC Moeller Pardubice | CZE U18 | 40 | 9 | 7 | 16 | 28 | 2 | 1 | 0 | 1 | 2 |
| 2008–09 | HC Moeller Pardubice | CZE U18 | 22 | 14 | 21 | 35 | 34 | 4 | 3 | 0 | 3 | 2 |
| 2008–09 | HC Moeller Pardubice | CZE U20 | 23 | 2 | 8 | 10 | 8 | 3 | 0 | 1 | 1 | 0 |
| 2009–10 | HC Eaton Pardubice | CZE U18 | 5 | 4 | 8 | 12 | 0 | 6 | 2 | 7 | 9 | 2 |
| 2009–10 | HC Eaton Pardubice | CZE U20 | 16 | 3 | 9 | 12 | 4 | — | — | — | — | — |
| 2010–11 | HC Eaton Pardubice | CZE U20 | 51 | 30 | 33 | 63 | 64 | — | — | — | — | — |
| 2010–11 | HC Chrudim | CZE.2 | 14 | 1 | 8 | 9 | 0 | — | — | — | — | — |
| 2011–12 | HC ČSOB Pojišťovna Pardubice | CZE U20 | 13 | 13 | 13 | 26 | 8 | — | — | — | — | — |
| 2011–12 | HC ČSOB Pojišťovna Pardubice | ELH | 27 | 0 | 4 | 4 | 2 | — | — | — | — | — |
| 2011–12 | HC VCES Hradec Králové, a.s. | CZE.2 | 5 | 2 | 0 | 2 | 0 | 3 | 0 | 0 | 0 | 0 |
| 2012–13 | HC ČSOB Pojišťovna Pardubice | CZE U20 | 6 | 5 | 9 | 14 | 4 | — | — | — | — | — |
| 2012–13 | HC ČSOB Pojišťovna Pardubice | ELH | 50 | 5 | 9 | 14 | 20 | 3 | 0 | 0 | 0 | 0 |
| 2012–13 | Královští lvi Hradec Králové, a.s. | CZE.2 | 5 | 4 | 1 | 5 | 2 | — | — | — | — | — |
| 2013–14 | HC ČSOB Pojišťovna Pardubice | ELH | 52 | 19 | 25 | 44 | 36 | 10 | 3 | 3 | 6 | 44 |
| 2014–15 | Grand Rapids Griffins | AHL | 55 | 11 | 23 | 34 | 22 | 12 | 2 | 5 | 7 | 4 |
| 2015–16 | Grand Rapids Griffins | AHL | 70 | 15 | 15 | 30 | 42 | 9 | 1 | 0 | 1 | 6 |
| 2015–16 | Detroit Red Wings | NHL | 6 | 0 | 0 | 0 | 2 | — | — | — | — | — |
| 2016–17 | Grand Rapids Griffins | AHL | 51 | 15 | 26 | 41 | 33 | 19 | 10 | 12 | 22 | 18 |
| 2016–17 | Detroit Red Wings | NHL | 11 | 1 | 0 | 1 | 2 | — | — | — | — | — |
| 2017–18 | Vegas Golden Knights | NHL | 67 | 7 | 8 | 15 | 14 | 17 | 4 | 2 | 6 | 8 |
| 2018–19 | Vegas Golden Knights | NHL | 68 | 8 | 9 | 17 | 18 | 7 | 0 | 0 | 0 | 14 |
| 2019–20 | Vegas Golden Knights | NHL | 67 | 8 | 7 | 15 | 20 | 8 | 2 | 1 | 3 | 2 |
| 2020–21 | Vegas Golden Knights | NHL | 38 | 8 | 10 | 18 | 10 | 6 | 0 | 1 | 1 | 4 |
| 2021–22 | Boston Bruins | NHL | 75 | 3 | 14 | 17 | 32 | 7 | 0 | 2 | 2 | 0 |
| 2022–23 | Boston Bruins | NHL | 66 | 7 | 11 | 18 | 48 | 7 | 0 | 2 | 2 | 0 |
| 2023–24 | New Jersey Devils | NHL | 36 | 2 | 4 | 6 | 6 | — | — | — | — | — |
| 2024–25 | Florida Panthers | NHL | 59 | 1 | 8 | 9 | 10 | 16 | 0 | 3 | 3 | 4 |
| 2025–26 | Florida Panthers | NHL | 21 | 2 | 2 | 4 | 4 | — | — | — | — | — |
| NHL totals | | | 514 | 47 | 73 | 120 | 166 | 68 | 6 | 11 | 17 | 32 |

=== International ===
| Year | Team | Event | Result | GP | G | A | Pts | PIM |
|---|---|---|---|---|---|---|---|---|
| 2012 | Czech Republic | WJC | 5th | 6 | 0 | 1 | 1 | 2 |
| Junior totals | | | | 6 | 0 | 1 | 1 | 2 |

== Awards and honours ==
| Award | Year | Ref |
AHL
| Calder Cup champion | 2017 | |
NHL
| Stanley Cup champion | 2025 | |
