= 2025 Stanley Cup Final =

2025 ice hockey championship series

	1	2	3	4	5	6	Total
Florida Panthers	3*	5**	6	4*	5	5	4
Edmonton Oilers	4*	4**	1	5*	2	1	2
- * – Denotes overtime period(s)
- Location(s): Sunrise: Amerant Bank Arena; Edmonton: Rogers Place
- Coaches: Florida: Paul Maurice; Edmonton: Kris Knoblauch
- Captains: Florida: Aleksander Barkov; Edmonton: Connor McDavid
- National anthems: Florida: Jon Acosta (3), Hannah Walpole (4), Matthew Bischoff (6); Edmonton: Robert Clark
- Referees: Francis Charron (1, 3, 5); Jean Hebert (2, 4, 6); Wes McCauley (1, 3, 5); Chris Rooney (2, 4, 6)
- Dates: June 4–17, 2025
- MVP: Sam Bennett (Panthers)
- Series-winning goal: Matthew Tkachuk (19:13, first)
- Networks: Canada: (English): CBC/Sportsnet/Sportsnet+ (French): TVA Sports; United States: (English): TNT/TruTV/Max
- Announcers: (CBC/SN) Chris Cuthbert and Craig Simpson (TNT Sports) Kenny Albert, Eddie Olczyk, and Brian Boucher

The 2025 Stanley Cup Final was the championship series of the National Hockey League's (NHL) 2024–25 season and the culmination of the 2025 Stanley Cup playoffs. In a rematch of the previous year's Final, the Eastern Conference and defending Stanley Cup champion Florida Panthers defeated the Western Conference champion Edmonton Oilers four games to two in the best-of-seven series, earning their second consecutive championship, as well as the second title in team history.

The series began on June 4 and concluded on June 17. Edmonton had home ice advantage in the series due to having the better regular season record. This was the sixth consecutive Final to feature a team from Florida. This was the first time since 2009 that the Final featured a rematch of the previous season, and the first time since 1978 that the rematch was won by the same team as the year before. It was also the first time since 2012 that neither finalist had home-ice advantage in the first three rounds.

== Paths to the Final ==
=== Edmonton Oilers ===
This was Edmonton's second consecutive and ninth overall Final appearance. They have won the Stanley Cup five times, each between 1984 and 1990 during their dynasty years. Their most recent Stanley Cup win came in 1990 when they defeated the Boston Bruins in five games.

Shortly after the 2024 Final, with his contract expiring, general manager Ken Holland departed the team; CEO Jeff Jackson took over interim GM duties until the team hired former Chicago Blackhawks general manager Stan Bowman. In free agency, the Oilers acquired forwards Jeff Skinner and Viktor Arvidsson along with defencemen Connor Carrick and Josh Brown. They also re-signed forwards Connor Brown, Adam Henrique, Mattias Janmark, Corey Perry, and Leon Draisaitl, as well as defenceman Troy Stecher, while losing Warren Foegele in free agency to the Los Angeles Kings, as well as Philip Broberg and Dylan Holloway to an offer sheet from the St. Louis Blues. Approaching the trade deadline, the team acquired forward Kasperi Kapanen off of waivers, signed defenceman John Klingberg, and also completed a three-way trade with the Boston Bruins and New Jersey Devils to acquire forwards Trent Frederic and Max Jones. On the day of the trade deadline, the team traded for San Jose Sharks defenceman Jake Walman.

Draisaitl led the team in scoring with 52 goals and 106 points, tying for third in the league in the latter. Perry was making his fifth Final appearance in six seasons and sixth appearance overall, previously winning with the Anaheim Ducks in 2007 and losing with the Dallas Stars in 2020, Montreal Canadiens in 2021, Tampa Bay Lightning in 2022, and the Oilers the previous season.

Edmonton finished third place in the Pacific Division during the regular season with a 48–29–5 record. In the first round, they defeated their intra-division rival, the Los Angeles Kings, in six games, eliminating them for the fourth consecutive season. They then defeated the division champion Vegas Golden Knights in five games during the second round. In the Western Conference final, they triumphed over the Dallas Stars for the second consecutive season, winning in five games.

=== Florida Panthers ===
This was Florida's third consecutive and fourth overall Final appearance. They have won one Stanley Cup, doing so the previous season against the Oilers in seven games after giving up a 3–0 series lead.

During the off-season, in free agency, the Panthers acquired forwards Jesper Boqvist, A. J. Greer, and Tomáš Nosek, as well as defenceman Nate Schmidt. They also re-signed forwards Sam Reinhart, Anton Lundell, and Carter Verhaeghe, along with defenceman Dmitry Kulikov. Nearing the trade deadline, the team acquired defenceman Seth Jones from the Chicago Blackhawks, as well as goaltender Vítek Vaněček and forward Nico Sturm from the San Jose Sharks in separate transactions. On the day of the trade deadline, the team traded for Boston Bruins captain Brad Marchand.

Reinhart led the team in scoring with 81 points. Team captain Aleksander Barkov won his third Frank J. Selke Trophy as the NHL's best defensive forward.

Florida finished third place in the Atlantic Division during the regular season with a 47–31–4 record. In the first round, they defeated their intra-state rivals, the Tampa Bay Lightning, in five games. They then defeated the division champion Toronto Maple Leafs in seven games during the second round, despite initially trailing 2–0 and 3–2 in the series. In the Eastern Conference final, they eliminated the Carolina Hurricanes for the second time in three seasons, winning in five games.

== Game summaries ==
Note: The numbers in parentheses represent each player's total goals or assists to that point of the entire playoffs. pp = power play goal, sh = short-handed goal, en = empty net goal

=== Game one ===
June 4	Florida Panthers	3–4	OT	Edmonton Oilers	Rogers Place	Recap

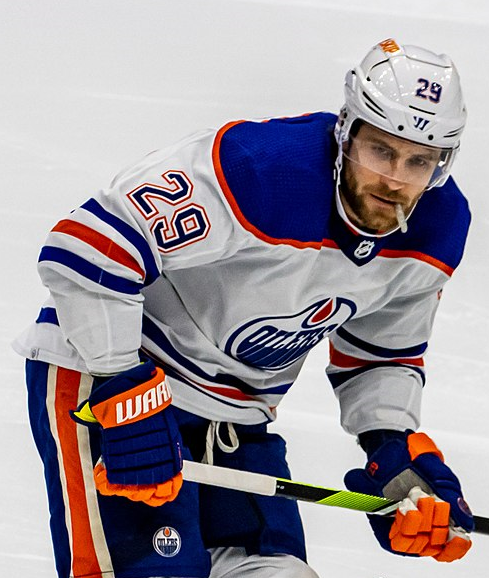
Leon Draisaitl scored two goals in game one, including the overtime winner.

In the first period of game one, Leon Draisaitl began the scoring for the Oilers as Jake Walman's shot was stopped by Florida goaltender Sergei Bobrovsky and Kasperi Kapanen's shot attempts were deflected to Draisaitl who made it 1–0. The Panthers tied the game when Carter Verhaeghe's shot was deflected in front of the net by Sam Bennett. The Oilers tried to challenge the goal on goaltender interference, but they were unsuccessful. In the ensuing power play for the Panthers, Brad Marchand scored to give Florida a 2–1 lead. In the second period, Bennett extended the lead for the Panthers, accepting a pass from Nate Schmidt and snapping the shot past Stuart Skinner. Viktor Arvidsson then scored for Edmonton, firing a slap shot past Bobrovsky to cut Florida's lead to one goal. The Oilers tied the game in the third period as Mattias Ekholm, who had been injured for most of the playoffs returning late in the previous series against Dallas, scored after receiving a pass from Connor McDavid. With the score tied going into overtime, Panthers forward Tomáš Nosek was penalized for shooting the puck over the glass. On the ensuing power play, Corey Perry passed to McDavid setting up Draisaitl's goal for Edmonton's 4–3 victory.

Scoring summary
Period	Team	Goal	Assist(s)	Time	Score
1st	EDM	Leon Draisaitl (8)	Kasperi Kapanen (1), Jake Walman (6)	01:06	1–0 EDM
1st	FLA	Sam Bennett (11)	Carter Verhaeghe (9), Matthew Tkachuk (12)	10:49	1–1
1st	FLA	Brad Marchand (5) – pp	Nate Schmidt (5), Evan Rodrigues (11)	12:30	2–1 FLA
2nd	FLA	Sam Bennett (12)	Nate Schmidt (6), Carter Verhaeghe (10)	02:00	3–1 FLA
2nd	EDM	Viktor Arvidsson (2)	Vasily Podkolzin (6), Evan Bouchard (12)	03:17	3–2 FLA
3rd	EDM	Mattias Ekholm (1)	Connor McDavid (21), Kasperi Kapanen (2)	06:33	3–3
OT	EDM	Leon Draisaitl (9) – pp	Connor McDavid (22), Corey Perry (4)	19:29	4–3 EDM
Penalty summary
Period	Team	Player	Penalty	Time	PIM
1st	EDM	Corey Perry	High-sticking	06:53	2:00
1st	EDM	Bench (served by Corey Perry)	Delay of game (unsuccessful coach's challenge)	10:49	2:00
1st	FLA	Anton Lundell	Interference	12:40	2:00
1st	EDM	Corey Perry	Tripping	12:46	2:00
1st	FLA	Aaron Ekblad	Holding	13:04	2:00
2nd	FLA	Evan Rodrigues	High-sticking	18:47	2:00
3rd	None				
OT	FLA	Tomáš Nosek	Delay of game (puck over glass)	18:17	2:00

Shots by period
Team	1	2	3	OT	Total
FLA	7	17	2	6	32
EDM	15	8	14	10	46

=== Game two ===
June 6	Florida Panthers	5–4	2OT	Edmonton Oilers	Rogers Place	Recap

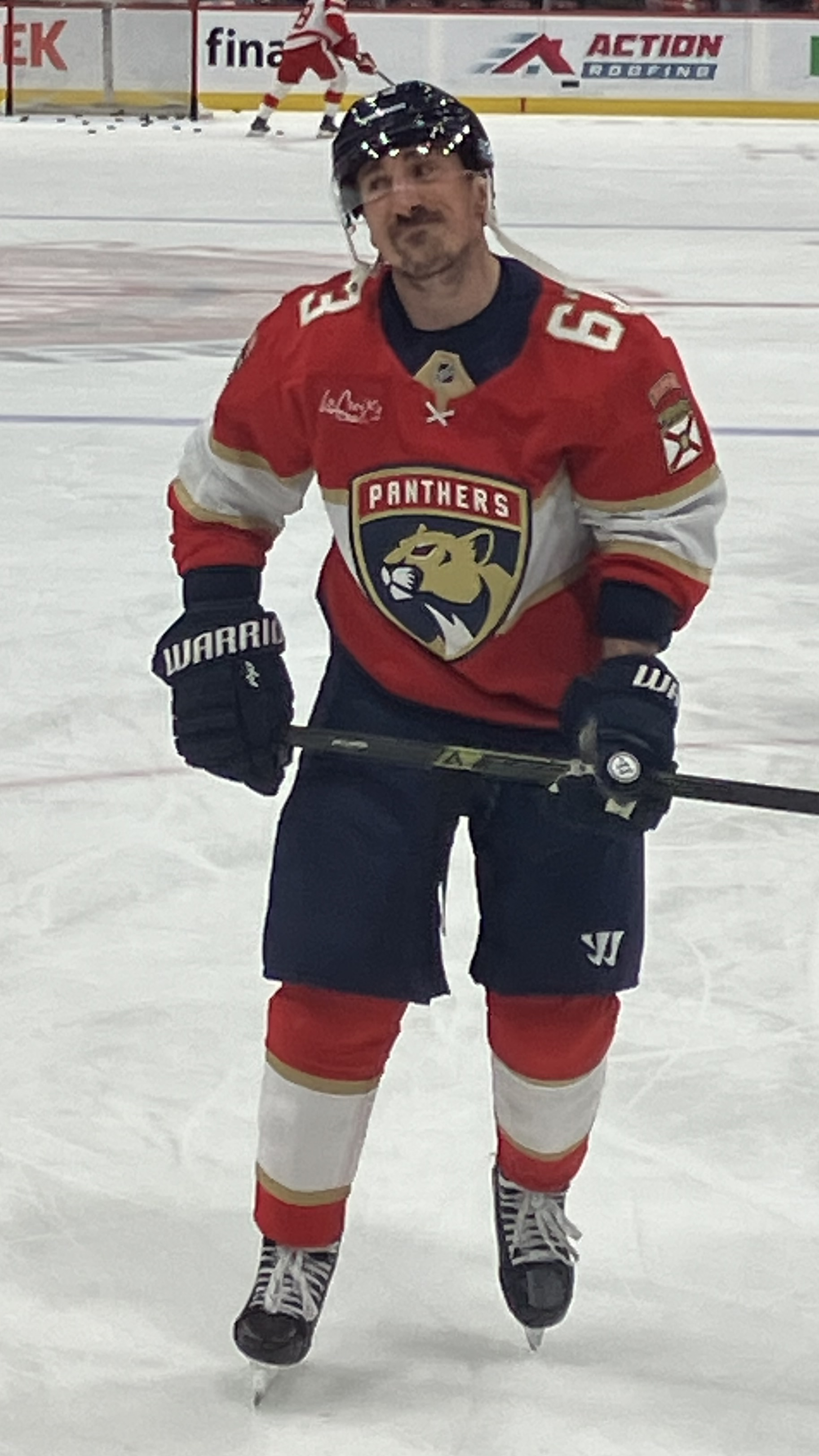
Brad Marchand scored two goals in game two, including the overtime winner.

Early in the first period, Evander Kane was penalized for high-sticking Carter Verhaeghe. On the ensuing power play, Sam Bennett scored, taking a pass from Nate Schmidt and Evan Rodrigues. Kane would tie the game 1–1 for Edmonton, firing a snap shot past Sergei Bobrovsky. Defenceman Evan Bouchard would give the Oilers a 2–1 lead as his initial shot was blocked, but his second shot went into the net. The Panthers tied the game as Eetu Luostarinen passed to an open Seth Jones snapping a shot past goaltender Stuart Skinner. The Oilers regained the lead as Connor McDavid skated the puck through a Panther defenceman and passed to Leon Draisaitl who scored to make it 3–2. In the second period, Dmitry Kulikov then evened the score for the Panthers, snapping a shot through traffic to make it 3–3. The Panthers were able to make it 4–3 when Brad Marchand scored a shorthanded breakaway goal. In the final minutes of the third period, the Oilers pulled their goaltender and with 18 seconds remaining, Corey Perry scored to send the game to overtime. In double-overtime, Marchand scored his second of the game in another breakaway, evening the series 1–1.

Scoring summary
Period	Team	Goal	Assist(s)	Time	Score
1st	FLA	Sam Bennett (13) – pp	Nate Schmidt (7), Evan Rodrigues (12)	02:07	1–0 FLA
1st	EDM	Evander Kane (6)	Viktor Arvidsson (5), Evan Bouchard (13)	07:39	1–1
1st	EDM	Evan Bouchard (7)	Connor McDavid (23), Leon Draisaitl (19)	09:19	2–1 EDM
1st	FLA	Seth Jones (4)	Eetu Luostarinen (10), Nate Schmidt (8)	11:37	2–2
1st	EDM	Leon Draisaitl (10) – pp	Connor McDavid (24), Evan Bouchard (14)	12:37	3–2 EDM
2nd	FLA	Dmitry Kulikov (2)	Carter Verhaeghe (11), Seth Jones (5)	08:23	3–3
2nd	FLA	Brad Marchand (6) – sh	Anton Lundell (8)	12:09	4–3 FLA
3rd	EDM	Corey Perry (8)	Jake Walman (7), Connor McDavid (25)	19:42	4–4
OT	None				
2OT	FLA	Brad Marchand (7)	Anton Lundell (9)	08:05	5–4 FLA
Penalty summary
Period	Team	Player	Penalty	Time	PIM
1st	EDM	Evander Kane	High-sticking	00:37	2:00
1st	FLA	Aaron Ekblad	Holding the stick	02:54	2:00
1st	EDM	Ryan Nugent-Hopkins	Tripping	03:32	2:00
1st	EDM	Darnell Nurse	Cross-checking	08:49	2:00
1st	FLA	Matthew Tkachuk	Slashing	08:49	2:00
1st	FLA	Sam Bennett	Goaltender interference	12:13	2:00
1st	FLA	Matthew Tkachuk	Roughing	12:13	2:00
1st	EDM	Trent Frederic	Roughing	12:13	2:00
1st	FLA	Niko Mikkola	Roughing	13:46	2:00
1st	FLA	Seth Jones	Holding	15:13	2:00
1st	EDM	Evan Bouchard	Cross-checking	18:41	2:00
2nd	FLA	Niko Mikkola	Hooking	11:06	2:00
2nd	EDM	Evan Bouchard	Cross-checking	17:56	2:00
2nd	FLA	Carter Verhaeghe	Hooking	19:11	2:00
3rd	None				
OT	None				
2OT	None				

Shots by period
Team	1	2	3	OT	2OT	Total
FLA	11	14	5	8	4	42
EDM	14	9	9	13	1	46

=== Game three ===
June 9	Edmonton Oilers	1–6	Florida Panthers	Amerant Bank Arena	Recap

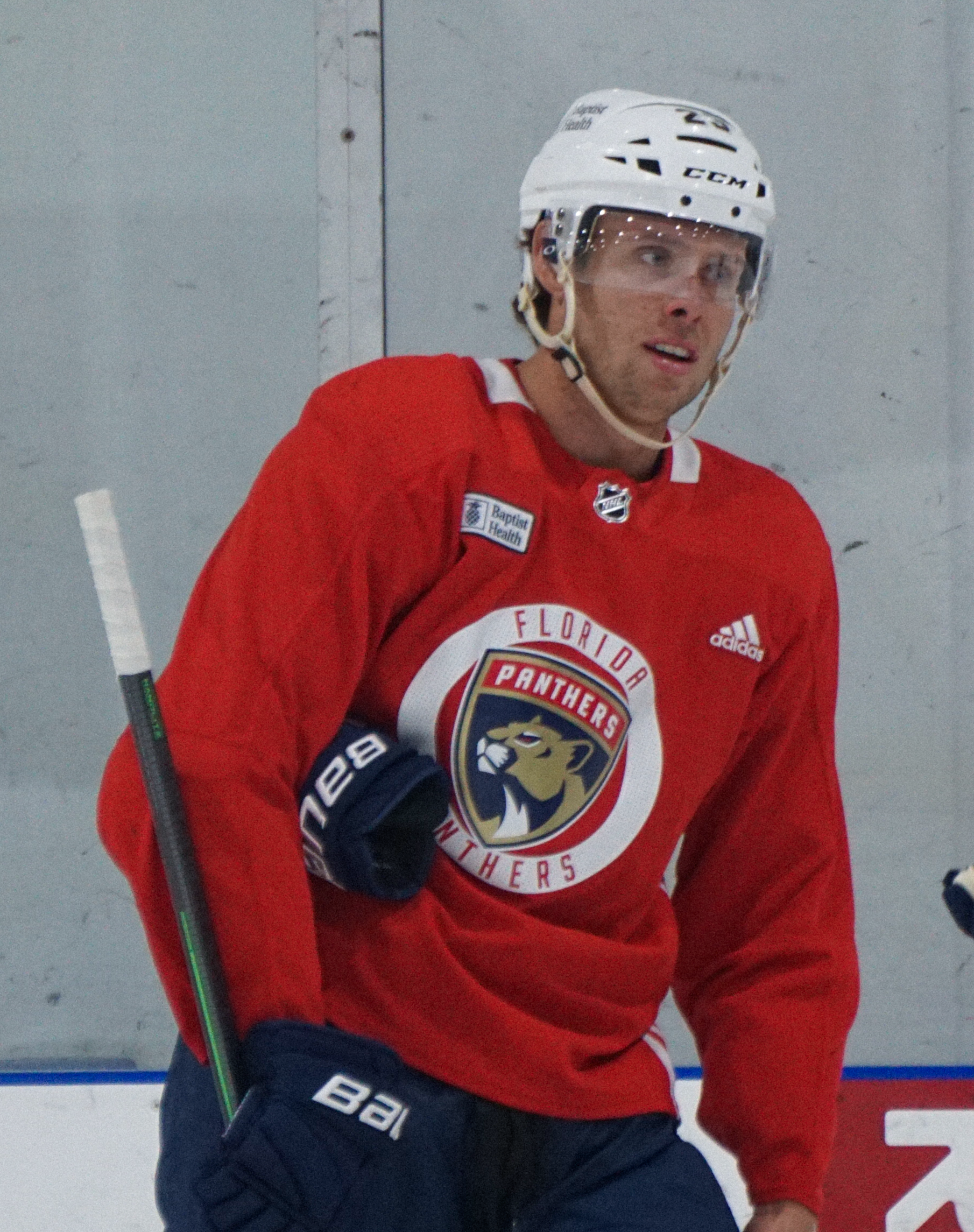
Carter Verhaeghe recorded the game-winning goal and an assist in game three.

Game three began as game two ended with Brad Marchand scoring 56 seconds into the first period. The Panthers made it 2–0 on the power play as Evan Rodrigues made the pass to Carter Verhaeghe who wristed it past Oilers goaltender Stuart Skinner. In the second period, a shot by Evan Bouchard was deflected by Sergei Bobrovsky to Corey Perry who cut the goal deficit for the Oilers to 2–1. Forward Sam Reinhart restored the two-goal lead for Florida, taking the pass from Verhaeghe. The Panthers then made it 4–1 when a two-on-zero rush allowed Sam Bennett to breakaway a wrist a shot past Skinner. In the third period, Skinner attempted to clear the puck but did so over the glass giving Florida a power play. On the ensuing power play, Matthew Tkachuk made a pass to Reinhart who backhand-passed to Aaron Ekblad to make it 5–1. Skinner was pulled after this goal. Midway through the period, the Panthers and Oilers had some fights. By the end of the game, the Oilers accumulated 85 penalty minutes, the most for one team in a Stanley Cup Final game since game four of the 1986 Stanley Cup Final. Rodrigues would get the sixth goal for the Panthers, scoring on a two-man advantage.

Scoring summary
Period	Team	Goal	Assist(s)	Time	Score
1st	FLA	Brad Marchand (8)	Anton Lundell (10), Eetu Luostarinen (11)	00:56	1–0 FLA
1st	FLA	Carter Verhaeghe (7) – pp	Evan Rodrigues (13), Nate Schmidt (9)	17:45	2–0 FLA
2nd	EDM	Corey Perry (9) – pp	Evan Bouchard (15), Mattias Ekholm (2)	01:40	2–1 FLA
2nd	FLA	Sam Reinhart (5)	Carter Verhaeghe (12)	03:00	3–1 FLA
2nd	FLA	Sam Bennett (14)	Eetu Luostarinen (12)	07:26	4–1 FLA
3rd	FLA	Aaron Ekblad (4) – pp	Sam Reinhart (10), Matthew Tkachuk (13)	03:27	5–1 FLA
3rd	FLA	Evan Rodrigues (4) – pp	Niko Mikkola (3), Gustav Forsling (4)	16:10	6–1 FLA
Penalty summary
Period	Team	Player	Penalty	Time	PIM
1st	FLA	Anton Lundell	Tripping	03:22	2:00
1st	EDM	Evander Kane	Cross-checking	05:13	2:00
1st	EDM	Evander Kane	High-sticking	07:54	2:00
1st	EDM	Bench (served by Corey Perry)	Too many men on the ice	10:09	2:00
1st	FLA	Aaron Ekblad	Tripping	11:02	2:00
1st	FLA	Sam Bennett	High-sticking	14:37	2:00
1st	EDM	Viktor Arvidsson	Goaltender interference	17:14	2:00
1st	FLA	Anton Lundell	Roughing	20:00	2:00
2nd	EDM	Darnell Nurse	Cross-checking	19:15	2:00
3rd	EDM	Stuart Skinner (served by Evander Kane)	Delay of game (puck over glass)	02:19	2:00
3rd	EDM	Mattias Janmark	Roughing	05:07	2:00
3rd	FLA	Brad Marchand	Roughing	07:52	2:00
3rd	EDM	Trent Frederic	Cross-checking	10:29	2:00
3rd	EDM	Trent Frederic	Roughing	10:29	2:00
3rd	FLA	A. J. Greer	Roughing	10:29	2:00
3rd	FLA	Sam Bennett	Roughing	10:29	2:00
3rd	EDM	Darnell Nurse	Roughing	10:29	2:00
3rd	EDM	Darnell Nurse	Fighting – major	10:29	5:00
3rd	FLA	Jonah Gadjovich	Fighting – major	10:29	5:00
3rd	FLA	A. J. Greer	Misconduct	10:29	10:00
3rd	FLA	Sam Bennett	Misconduct	10:29	10:00
3rd	FLA	Jonah Gadjovich	Misconduct	10:29	10:00
3rd	EDM	Darnell Nurse	Misconduct	10:29	10:00
3rd	EDM	Trent Fredric	Misconduct	10:29	10:00
3rd	EDM	Mattias Ekholm	Misconduct	10:29	10:00
3rd	EDM	Evander Kane (served by Corey Perry)	Slashing	13:55	2:00
3rd	EDM	Evander Kane	Misconduct	13:55	10:00
3rd	EDM	Jake Walman (served by Connor McDavid)	Unsportsmanlike conduct	14:44	2:00
3rd	EDM	Jake Walman	Roughing – double minor	14:44	4:00
3rd	FLA	Aaron Ekblad	Roughing – double minor	14:44	4:00
3rd	EDM	Kasperi Kapanen (served by Ryan Nugent-Hopkins)	Cross-checking	15:47	2:00
3rd	EDM	Kasperi Kapanen	Misconduct	15:47	10:00
3rd	FLA	Eetu Luostarinen	Charging	16:57	2:00

Shots by period
Team	1	2	3	Total
EDM	12	13	8	33
FLA	10	9	12	31

=== Game four ===
June 12	Edmonton Oilers	5–4	OT	Florida Panthers	Amerant Bank Arena	Recap

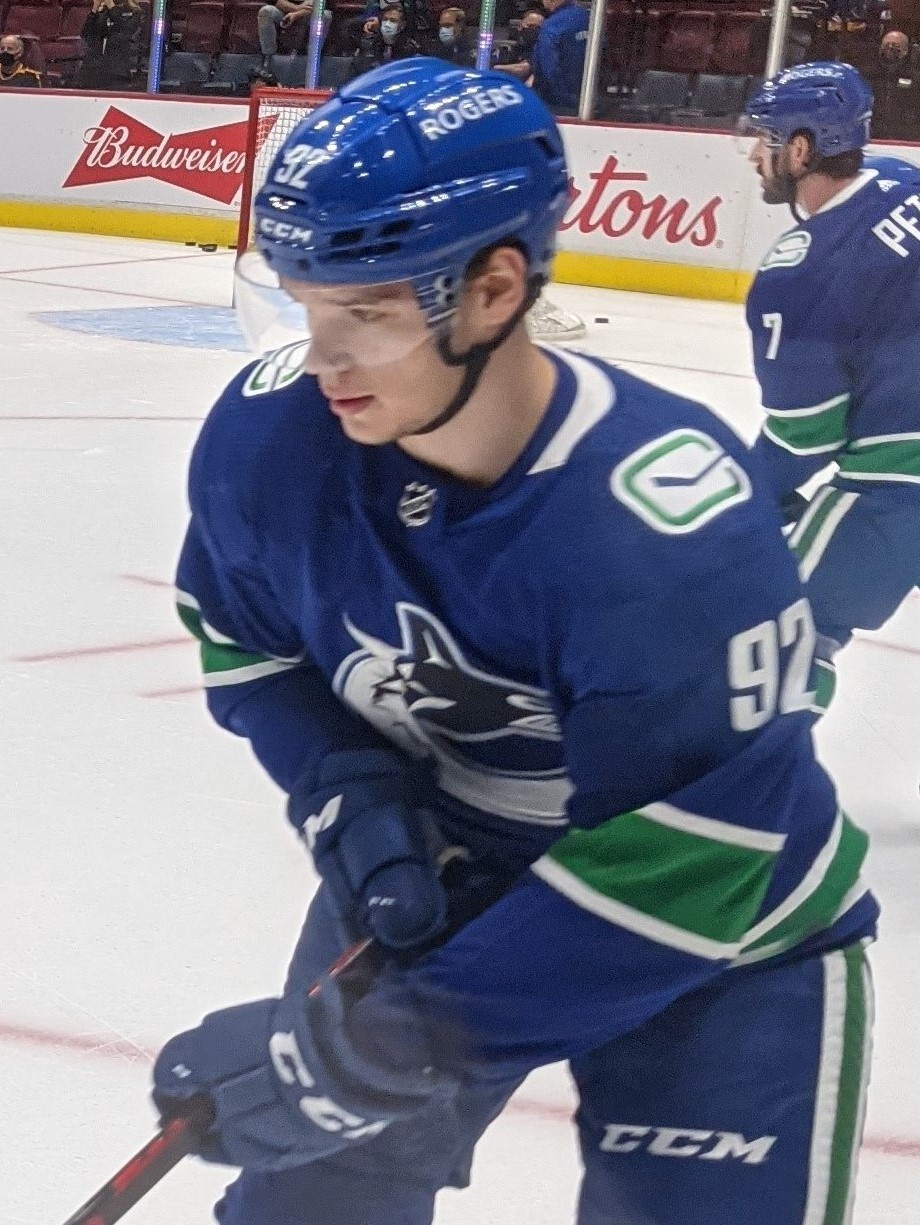
Vasily Podkolzin (pictured with the Vancouver Canucks) scored the game-tying goal and assisted on the overtime winner in game four.

The Oilers came back from a three-goal deficit in game four to emerge victorious in overtime. In the first period, with both Evander Kane and Darnell Nurse in the penalty box for separate infractions, Florida captain Aleksander Barkov off the faceoff passed to Matthew Tkachuk whose snap shot beat Stuart Skinner to make it 1–0. Tkachuk made it 2–0 on another power play, picking up a rebound from Sam Reinhart's shot on Skinner. Towards the end of the first period, Carter Verhaeghe picked up a loose puck in the offensive zone sending it back to Anton Lundell who fired a wrist shot past Skinner. In the second period, the Oilers got on the power play and with Leon Draisaitl's pass to Ryan Nugent-Hopkins, Edmonton scored to cut the deficit to two goals. Midway through the second, in the Panthers defensive zone, Mattias Ekholm passed to Darnell Nurse whose shot at a tight angle got past Sergei Bobrovsky to cut the deficit to one goal. The Oilers tied it when Vasily Podkolzin backhand shot the puck past Bobrovsky. In the third period, after the Panthers turned over the puck, Kasperi Kapanen passed to Jake Walman who scored to make it 4–3 for Edmonton. With under a minute left in the third period, the Panthers pulled Bobrovsky for an extra skater. With 20 seconds remaining, Reinhart scored for Florida to send it to overtime. In overtime, Draisatl while holding off a Florida defenceman, made a backhand shot that went between Bobrovsky. He scored his fourth overtime goal of the playoffs, setting the record for most overtime goals scored in one season. He also became the first player since John LeClair in 1993 to score two overtime goals in the same year in the Final. It was the seventh time a team came back from a three-goal deficit in the Final and the first since 2006.

Scoring summary
Period	Team	Goal	Assist(s)	Time	Score
1st	FLA	Matthew Tkachuk (6) – pp	Aleksander Barkov (12)	11:40	1–0 FLA
1st	FLA	Matthew Tkachuk (7) – pp	Sam Reinhart (11), Aleksander Barkov (13)	16:56	2–0 FLA
1st	FLA	Anton Lundell (6)	Carter Verhaeghe (13), Sam Reinhart (12)	19:18	3–0 FLA
2nd	EDM	Ryan Nugent-Hopkins (6) – pp	Leon Draisaitl (20), Connor McDavid (26)	03:33	3–1 FLA
2nd	EDM	Darnell Nurse (3)	Mattias Ekholm (3), Adam Henrique (3)	12:47	3–2 FLA
2nd	EDM	Vasily Podkolzin (2)	Darnell Nurse (4), Leon Draisaitl (21)	15:05	3–3
3rd	EDM	Jake Walman (2)	Kasperi Kapanen (3), Ryan Nugent-Hopkins (14)	13:36	4–3 EDM
3rd	FLA	Sam Reinhart (6)	Matthew Tkachuk (14), Sam Bennett (7)	19:40	4–4
OT	EDM	Leon Draisaitl (11)	Vasily Podkolzin (7), Mattias Ekholm (4)	11:18	5–4 EDM
Penalty summary
Period	Team	Player	Penalty	Time	PIM
1st	EDM	Evander Kane	High-sticking	10:38	2:00
1st	EDM	Darnell Nurse	Tripping	11:36	2:00
1st	EDM	Mattias Ekholm	High-sticking	15:18	2:00
2nd	FLA	Sam Bennett	Slashing	03:14	2:00
2nd	FLA	Dmitry Kulikov	Holding the stick	06:29	2:00
2nd	FLA	Aleksander Barkov	Delay of game (puck over glass)	12:57	2:00
2nd	EDM	Leon Draisaitl	Elbowing	19:28	2:00
3rd	FLA	Sam Bennett	Tripping	07:34	2:00
OT	None				

Shots by period
Team	1	2	3	OT	Total
EDM	7	17	7	4	35
FLA	17	10	9	4	40

=== Game five ===
June 14	Florida Panthers	5–2	Edmonton Oilers	Rogers Place	Recap

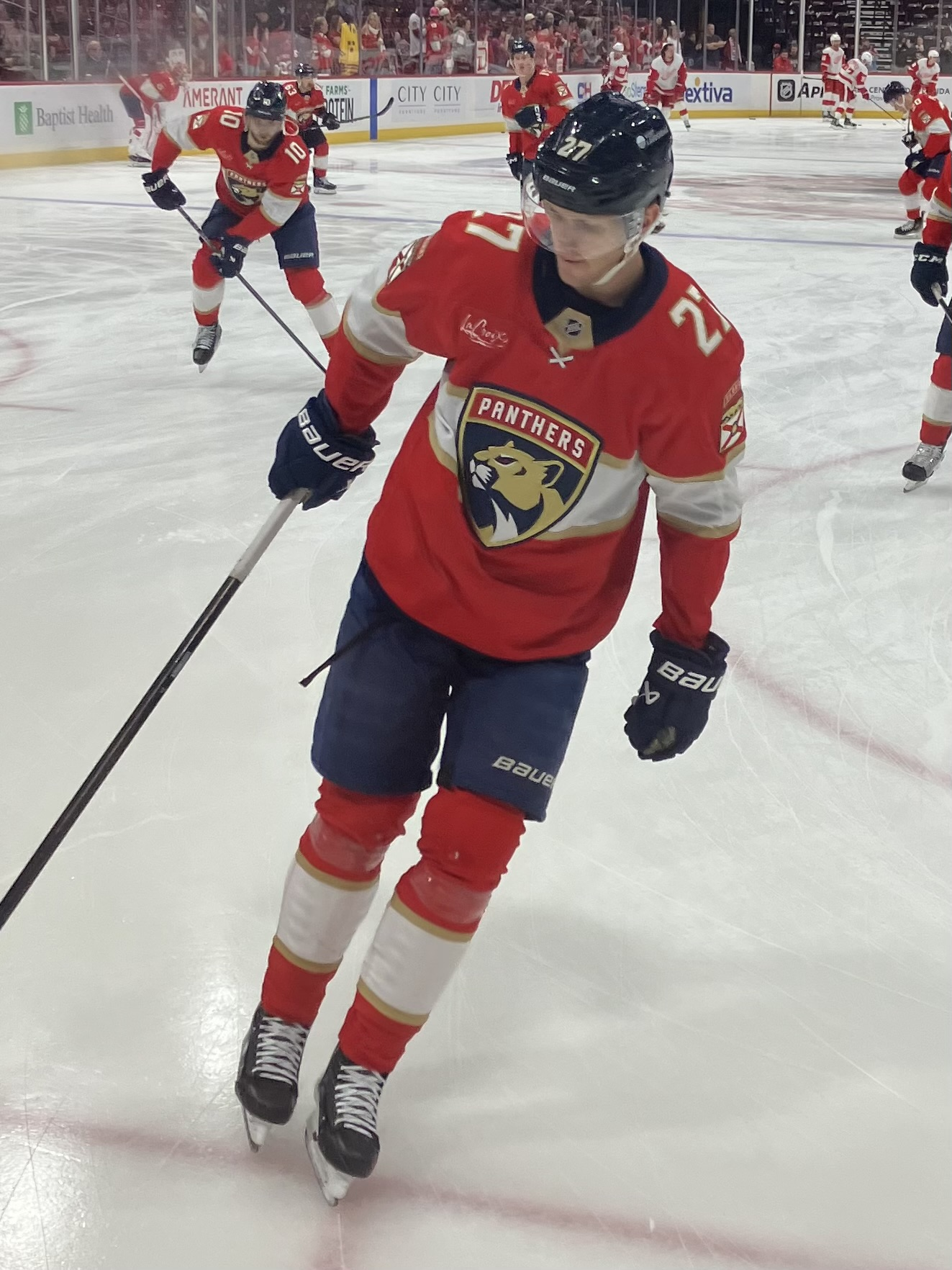
Eetu Luostarinen recorded a goal and an assist in game five.

In the first period of game five, Brad Marchand, after taking a pass from Anton Lundell, sped through the offensive zone and fired a snap shot past Oilers goaltender Calvin Pickard. Sam Bennett made it 2–0 for Florida, acquiring the puck on a rebound and shooting it past Pickard. In the second period, Marchand, after taking the pass from Eetu Luostarinen, moved the puck between Oilers defenceman Jake Walman to score on Pickard. Edmonton captain Connor McDavid cut the deficit to two goals, scoring a wrist shot on Sergei Bobrovsky to make it 3–1. Less than a minute later, the Panthers answered back as Sam Reinhart made it 4–1 taking the assist from Aleksander Barkov. The Oilers pulled their goaltender with less than four minutes left in the game. With the extra attacker, Corey Perry fired a slap shot that went past Bobrovsky, giving Edmonton their second goal of the game. The Oilers pulled their goaltender again, but with the empty net, Luostarinen scored to give Florida a 5–2 lead, en route to a 3–2 series lead.

Scoring summary
Period	Team	Goal	Assist(s)	Time	Score
1st	FLA	Brad Marchand (9)	Anton Lundell (11)	09:12	1–0 FLA
1st	FLA	Sam Bennett (15)	Matthew Tkachuk (15)	18:06	2–0 FLA
2nd	None				
3rd	FLA	Brad Marchand (10)	Eetu Luostarinen (13)	05:12	3–0 FLA
3rd	EDM	Connor McDavid (7)	Evan Bouchard (16), Mattias Ekholm (5)	07:24	3–1 FLA
3rd	FLA	Sam Reinhart (7)	Aleksander Barkov (14)	08:10	4–1 FLA
3rd	EDM	Corey Perry (10)	Leon Draisaitl (22), Darnell Nurse (5)	16:47	4–2 FLA
3rd	FLA	Eetu Luostarinen (5) – en	Unassisted	18:41	5–2 FLA
Penalty summary
Period	Team	Player	Penalty	Time	PIM
1st	FLA	Seth Jones	Interference	15:44	2:00
1st	EDM	Vasily Podkolzin	Tripping	18:17	2:00
2nd	FLA	Aaron Ekblad	Tripping	03:17	2:00
2nd	FLA	Sam Reinhart	Delay of game (puck over glass)	07:28	2:00
2nd	EDM	Leon Draisaitl	High-sticking	19:40	2:00
3rd	None				

Shots by period
Team	1	2	3	Total
FLA	8	5	6	19
EDM	3	8	10	21

=== Game six ===
June 17	Edmonton Oilers	1–5	Florida Panthers	Amerant Bank Arena	Recap

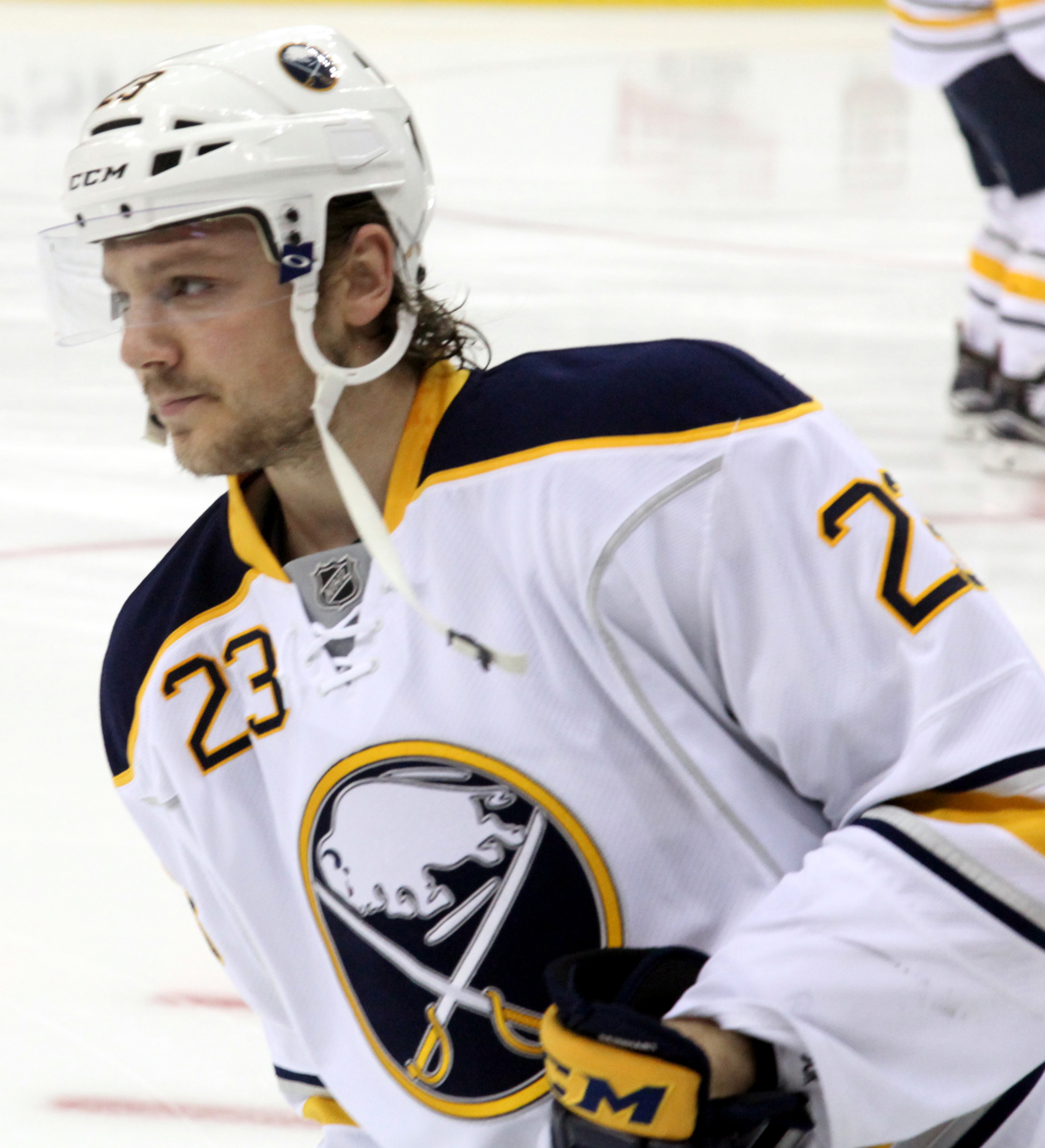
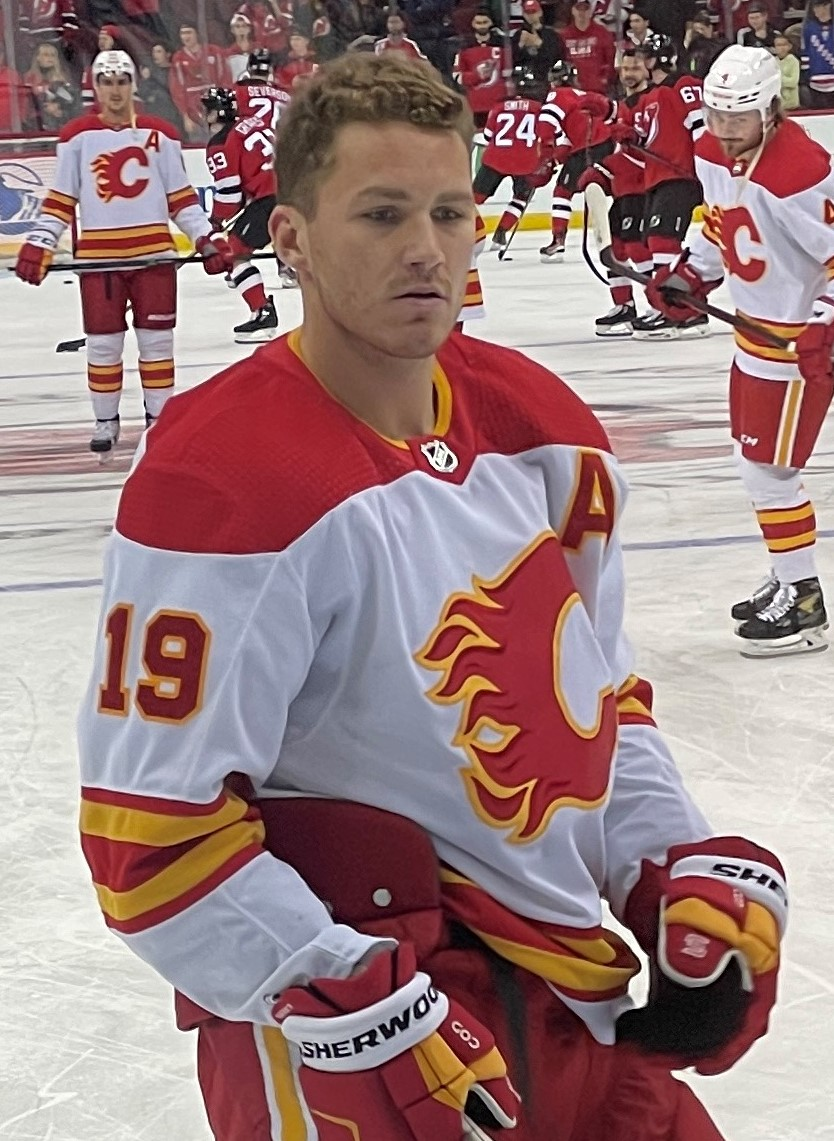
Sam Reinhart (left, pictured with the Buffalo Sabres) scored four goals, while Matthew Tkachuk (right, pictured with the Calgary Flames) scored the Stanley Cup-clinching goal in game six.

In game six, the Panthers began the scoring with Sam Reinhart picking up a defensive turnover by Evan Bouchard and snapping the puck past Stuart Skinner. Florida doubled the lead as Eetu Luostarinen made a pass to Matthew Tkachuk whose wrist shot beat Skinner. In the second period, captain Aleksander Barkov assisted in making it 3–0 for the Panthers as he gathered a rebound off of Skinner's right shoulder and fed Reinhart who was standing near the crease. The puck ultimately deflected off Reinhart's skate and past Skinner to extend the lead. As the end of the game approached, the Oilers pulled their goaltender with less than seven minutes left. However, the Panthers recovered the puck and Reinhart shot into the empty net, scoring a hat trick. He would get his fourth goal of the match, hitting another empty net goal with just over five minutes remaining. Reinhart became the first player since Babe Dye in 1922 and the second player overall in league history to score four goals in a series-clinching game in the Stanley Cup Final. Reinhart also became the first player to score four goals in a Final game since Maurice Richard in 1957. Edmonton would break the shutout as Vasily Podkolzin scored to make it 5–1. The Panthers defended their lead as Sergei Bobrovsky made 28 saves throughout the game, helping Florida earn their second Stanley Cup. Florida became the first team to defeat the same opponent in consecutive Final since the Montreal Canadiens defeated the Boston Bruins in 1978. In addition, they are the third team to win the Stanley Cup without having home ice advantage in any round of the playoffs after the 1994–95 New Jersey Devils and the 2011–12 Los Angeles Kings.

Sam Bennett was awarded the Conn Smythe Trophy as MVP of the playoffs.

Scoring summary
Period	Team	Goal	Assist(s)	Time	Score
1st	FLA	Sam Reinhart (8)	Unassisted	04:36	1–0 FLA
1st	FLA	Matthew Tkachuk (8) – pp	Eetu Luostarinen (14), Anton Lundell (12)	19:13	2–0 FLA
2nd	FLA	Sam Reinhart (9)	Aleksander Barkov (15), Carter Verhaeghe (14)	17:31	3–0 FLA
3rd	FLA	Sam Reinhart (10) – en	Aleksander Barkov (16), Carter Verhaeghe (15)	13:26	4–0 FLA
3rd	FLA	Sam Reinhart (11) – en	Carter Verhaeghe (16), Aaron Ekblad (9)	14:55	5–0 FLA
3rd	EDM	Vasily Podkolzin (3)	Jake Walman (8), Leon Draisaitl (23)	15:18	5–1 FLA
Penalty summary
Period	Team	Player	Penalty	Time	PIM
1st	EDM	Evander Kane	Slashing	09:45	2:00
1st	FLA	Sam Bennett	Roughing	09:45	2:00
2nd	None				
3rd	EDM	Evander Kane	Misconduct	17:47	10:00

Shots by period
Team	1	2	3	Total
EDM	10	10	9	29
FLA	9	9	7	25

== Team rosters ==
Years indicated in boldface under the "Final appearance" column signify that the player won the Stanley Cup in the given year.

=== Florida Panthers ===
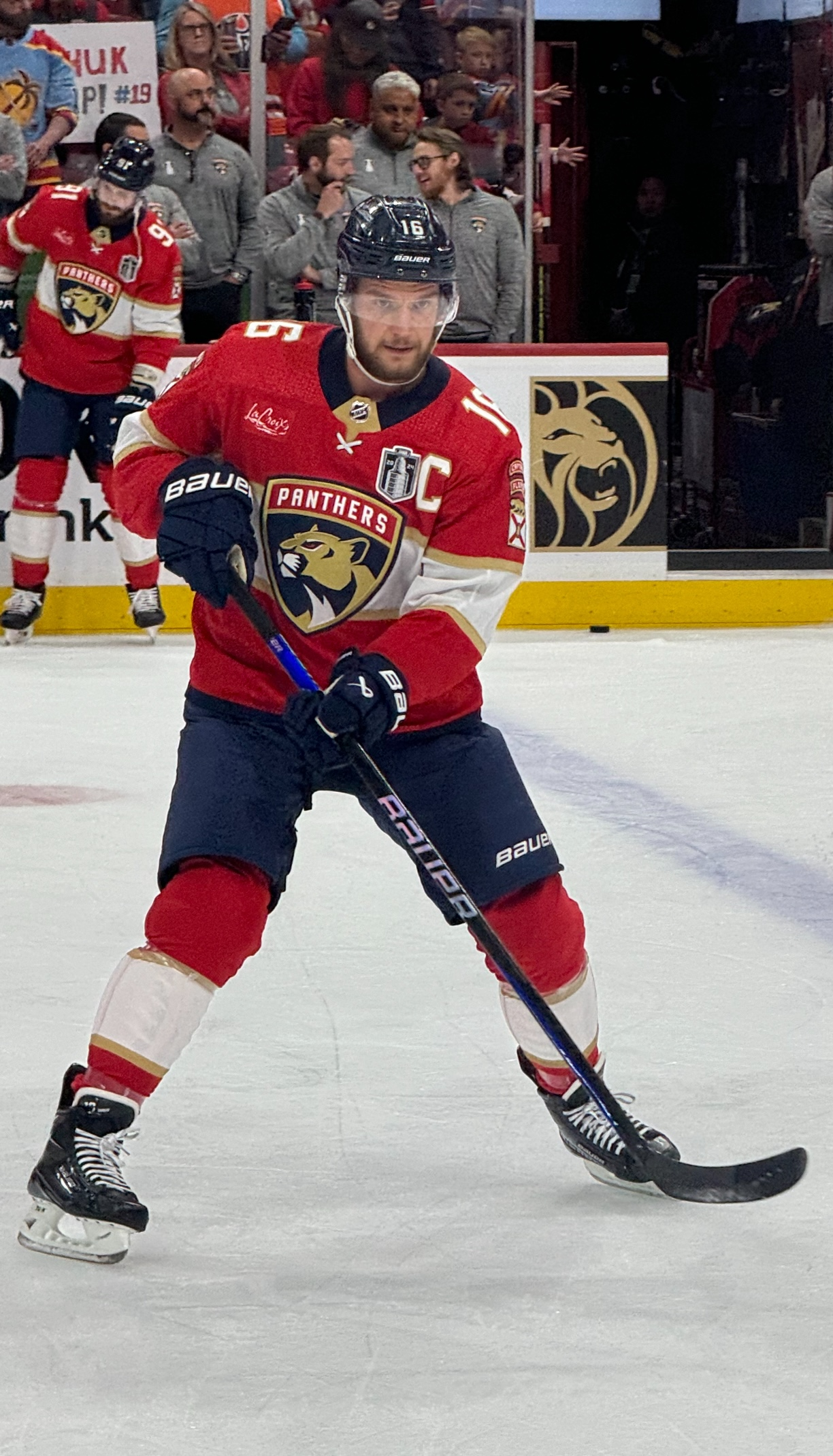
Aleksander Barkov captained the Panthers to their third consecutive and fourth overall Final appearance.

#	Nat	Player	Position	Hand	Age	Acquired	Place of birth	Final appearance
26	(Latvia)	Uvis Balinskis	D	L	28	2023	Ventspils, Latvia	first (did not play)
16	(Finland)	Aleksander Barkov – **C**	C	L	29	2013	Tampere, Finland	third (2023, **2024**)
9	(Canada)	Sam Bennett	C	L	28	2021	East Gwillimbury, Ontario	third (2023, **2024**)
72	(Russia)	Sergei Bobrovsky	G	L	36	2019	Novokuznetsk, Soviet Union	third (2023, **2024**)
70	(Sweden)	Jesper Boqvist	C/LW	L	26	2024	Falun, Sweden	first
5	(Canada)	Aaron Ekblad – **A**	D	R	29	2014	Windsor, Ontario	third (2023, **2024**)
42	(Sweden)	Gustav Forsling	D	L	28	2021	Linköping, Sweden	third (2023, **2024**)
12	(Canada)	Jonah Gadjovich	LW/RW	L	26	2023	Whitby, Ontario	second (**2024**)
10	(Canada)	A. J. Greer	LW	L	28	2024	Notre-Dame-des-Prairies, Quebec	first
3	(United States)	Seth Jones	D	R	30	2025	Arlington, Texas	first
7	(Russia)	Dmitry Kulikov	D	L	34	2023	Lipetsk, Soviet Union	second (**2024**)
15	(Finland)	Anton Lundell	C	L	23	2020	Espoo, Finland	third (2023, **2024**)
27	(Finland)	Eetu Luostarinen	C/LW	L	26	2020	Siilinjärvi, Finland	third (2023, **2024**)
63	(Canada)	Brad Marchand	LW/RW	L	37	2025	Halifax, Nova Scotia	fourth (**2011**, 2013, 2019)
77	(Finland)	Niko Mikkola	D	L	29	2023	Kiiminki, Finland	second (**2024**)
92	(Czech Republic)	Tomáš Nosek	LW/C	L	32	2024	Pardubice, Czechoslovakia	second (2018)
13	(Canada)	Sam Reinhart	C/RW	R	29	2021	North Vancouver, British Columbia	third (2023, **2024**)
17	(Canada)	Evan Rodrigues	C/LW	R	31	2023	Etobicoke, Ontario	second (**2024**)
25	(United States)	Mackie Samoskevich	RW	R	22	2021	Newtown, Connecticut	first (did not play)
88	(United States)	Nate Schmidt	D	L	33	2024	St. Cloud, Minnesota	second (2018)
8	(Germany)	Nico Sturm	C	L	30	2025	Augsburg, Germany	second (**2022**) (did not play)
19	(United States)	Matthew Tkachuk – **A**	RW/LW	L	27	2022	Scottsdale, Arizona	third (2023, **2024**)
41	(Czech Republic)	Vítek Vaněček	G	L	29	2025	Havlíčkův Brod, Czech Republic	first
23	(Canada)	Carter Verhaeghe	C/LW	L	29	2020	Waterdown, Ontario	fourth (**2020**, 2023, **2024**)

=== Edmonton Oilers ===
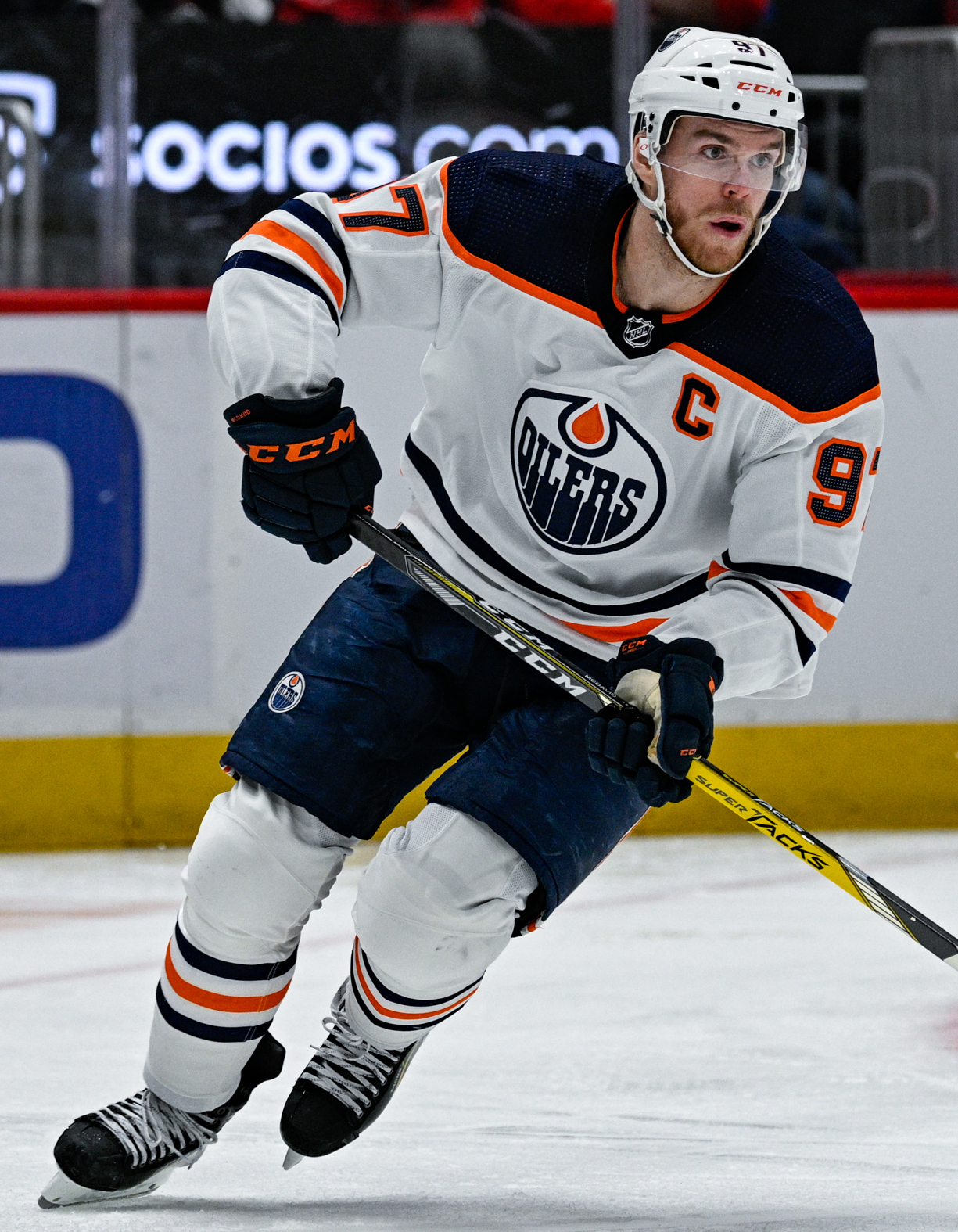
Connor McDavid captained the Oilers to their second consecutive and ninth overall Final appearance.

#	Nat	Player	Position	Hand	Age	Acquired	Place of birth	Final appearance
33	(Sweden)	Viktor Arvidsson	RW	R	32	2024	Skellefteå, Sweden	second (2017)
2	(Canada)	Evan Bouchard	D	R	25	2018	Oakville, Ontario	second (2024)
28	(Canada)	Connor Brown	RW	R	31	2023	Etobicoke, Ontario	second (2024)
29	(Germany)	Leon Draisaitl – **A**	C/LW	L	29	2014	Cologne, Germany	second (2024)
14	(Sweden)	Mattias Ekholm	D	L	35	2023	Borlänge, Sweden	third (2017, 2024)
49	(United States)	Ty Emberson	D	R	25	2024	Eau Claire, Wisconsin	first (did not play)
21	(United States)	Trent Frederic	C/LW	L	27	2025	St. Louis, Missouri	first
19	(Canada)	Adam Henrique	C	L	35	2024	Brantford, Ontario	third (2012, 2024)
18	(Canada)	Zach Hyman	LW	R	32	2021	Toronto, Ontario	second (2024) (did not play)
13	(Sweden)	Mattias Janmark	C	L	32	2022	Danderyd, Sweden	third (2020, 2024)
91	(Canada)	Evander Kane	LW	L	33	2022	Vancouver, British Columbia	second (2024)
42	(Finland)	Kasperi Kapanen	RW	R	28	2024	Kuopio, Finland	first
36	(Sweden)	John Klingberg	D	R	31	2025	Gothenburg, Sweden	second (2020)
27	(Canada)	Brett Kulak	D	L	31	2022	Stony Plain, Alberta	third (2021, 2024)
97	(Canada)	Connor McDavid – **C**	C	L	28	2015	Richmond Hill, Ontario	second (2024)
93	(Canada)	Ryan Nugent-Hopkins – **A**	C/LW	L	32	2011	Burnaby, British Columbia	second (2024)
25	(Canada)	Darnell Nurse – **A**	D	L	30	2013	Hamilton, Ontario	second (2024)
90	(Canada)	Corey Perry	RW	R	40	2024	New Liskeard, Ontario	sixth (**2007**, 2020, 2021, 2022, 2024)
30	(Canada)	Calvin Pickard	G	L	33	2022	Moncton, New Brunswick	second (2024)
92	(Russia)	Vasily Podkolzin	RW/LW	L	23	2024	Moscow, Russia	first
53	(Canada)	Jeff Skinner	LW	L	33	2024	Markham, Ontario	first
74	(Canada)	Stuart Skinner	G	L	26	2017	Edmonton, Alberta	second (2024)
51	(Canada)	Troy Stecher	D	R	31	2024	Richmond, British Columbia	first
96	(Canada)	Jake Walman	D	L	29	2025	Toronto, Ontario	first

== Stanley Cup engraving ==
The Stanley Cup was presented to Panthers captain Aleksander Barkov by NHL commissioner Gary Bettman following the Panthers' 5–1 win in game six.

2024–25 Florida Panthers

=== Players ===
Centres

- 8 Nico Sturm ‡
- 9 Sam Bennett
- 13 Sam Reinhart*
- 15 Anton Lundell
- 16 Aleksander Barkov (Captain)
- 17 Evan Rodrigues*
- 23 Carter Verhaeghe*
- 27 Eetu Luostarinen*
- 70 Jesper Boqvist*

Wingers

- 10 A. J. Greer
- 12 Jonah Gadjovich
- 19 Matthew Tkachuk (A)
- 25 Mackie Samoskevich †
- 63 Brad Marchand
- 92 Tomáš Nosek*

Defencemen

- 3 Seth Jones
- 5 Aaron Ekblad (A)
- 7 Dmitry Kulikov
- 26 Uvis Balinskis †
- 42 Gustav Forsling
- 77 Niko Mikkola
- 88 Nate Schmidt

Goaltenders

- 41 Vítek Vaněček
- 72 Sergei Bobrovsky
- * Played both centre and wing.
- † Did not play or dress in the Final.
- ‡ Did not automatically qualify, (Note: Automatic qualification for a player's name to be engraved on the Stanley Cup: Playing in (for a goaltender, dressing for) at least one Stanley Cup Final game or at least half of regular season games for the Stanley Cup winning team.) but name still engraved on the Stanley Cup.

=== Coaching and administrative staff ===
- Vincent Viola (owner/chairman/governor), Teresa Viola (alternate governor), John Viola (alternate governor), Michael Viola (alternate governor)
- Travis Viola (alternate governor), Matt Caldwell (president/CEO/alternate governor), Bill Zito (president of hockey operations/general manager/alternate governor), Paul Maurice (head coach)
- Gregory Campbell (assistant general manager), Roberto Luongo (special advisor to the general manager), Sunny Mehta (assistant general manager/head of analytics), Brett Peterson (assistant general manager)
- Jamie Kompon (assistant coach), Sylvain Lefebvre (assistant coach), Tuomo Ruutu (assistant coach), Robb Tallas (goaltending coach)
- Myles Fee (assistant coach), John Congemi (assistant video coach), Dave DiNapoli (head athletic trainer), Teddy Richards (head equipment manager)
- Shane Churla (director, amateur scouting),§ Tim Wittenauer (director of sports performance and rehabilitation),§ Mike Valcy (massage therapist),§ Thomas Anderson (assistant equipment manager)§
- Dakota King (assistant equipment manager),§ Brian Riedel (assistant athletic trainer),§ Mike Huff (vice president, player engagement),§ Mike Joyce (head strength and conditioning coach)§
- § Left off the 2024 Stanley Cup title engraving, but included on the 2025 title engraving. (Note: Mike Valcy (Mmassage therapist), Thomas Anderson (assistant equipment manager), Dakota King (assistant equipment manager), and Brian Riedel (assistant athletic trainer) were left off the Stanley Cup engraving of the 2024 title with Florida, but are on the 2025 title engraving, have rings for 2024 and 2025, and were included in the 2024 and 2025 Stanley Cup title pictures. Tim Wittenauer (director of sports performance and rehabilitation), Shane Churla (director, amateur scouting), Mike Huff (vice president, player engagement), and Mike Joyce (head strength and conditioning coach) also have rings for 2024 and 2025, were left off the 2024 title engraving, and were included on the 2025 title engraving.)

=== Engraving notes ===
- No. 8 Nico Sturm (C) played in 15 regular season games and 8 playoff games (all in the first three rounds) for Florida, previously 47 regular season games for San Jose. He was a healthy scratch for the entire Final. He did not automatically qualify, but his name was still engraved on the Stanley Cup. He became the first German player in NHL history to have his name engraved on the Stanley Cup with two different teams. He won his first Stanley Cup title with Colorado in 2022.
- Sam Reinhart was again engraved as his full first name of Samson.
- No. 6 Jaycob Megna (D – 8 regular season games) and No. 33 Evan Cormier (G – 0 regular season games, 36 for Savannah of the ECHL) did not play in or dress for the playoffs. Both were on the roster during the Final, but left off the Stanley Cup engraving due to not qualifying. Both were included in the team picture and received championship rings.
- Doug Cifu (vice chairman/alternate governor) was suspended by the NHL in May for the remainder of the playoffs due to comments that the league deemed to be "unacceptable and inappropriate." His name was included on the 2024 title engraving, but left off the engraving for the 2025 title.
- Paul Fenton (senior advisor to the general manager), Patric Hörnqvist (scouting and development consultant), Rick Dudley (senior advisor to the general manager), Bryan McCabe (director of player personnel), and Braden Birch (director of hockey operations and salary cap management) were on the 2024 Stanley Cup title engraving, but left off the 2025 title engraving to make room for new names on the 2025 engraving. They received championship rings in both seasons.

== Media rights ==
In Canada, this was the eleventh consecutive Stanley Cup Final broadcast by Sportsnet and CBC Television in English, and TVA Sports in French. The series was also streamed on Sportsnet+.

In the United States, the series was televised on TNT and simulcast on TruTV. This was the first time that the Final was available on Max since the service started streaming TNT Sports-produced NHL telecasts last season. This was the fourth year of a seven-year deal in which ABC has the Final in even years and TNT has the series in odd years.

For the second consecutive year, the Final had an alternate telecast with commentary and analysis in American Sign Language for the benefit of the deaf community. It was available on Sportsnet+ in Canada and Max in the U.S.

== Notes ==
Preceded by Florida Panthers; 2024	Florida Panthers; Stanley Cup champions 2025	Succeeded by Carolina Hurricanes; 2026
