= Jesper Boqvist =

Swedish ice hockey player (born 1998)

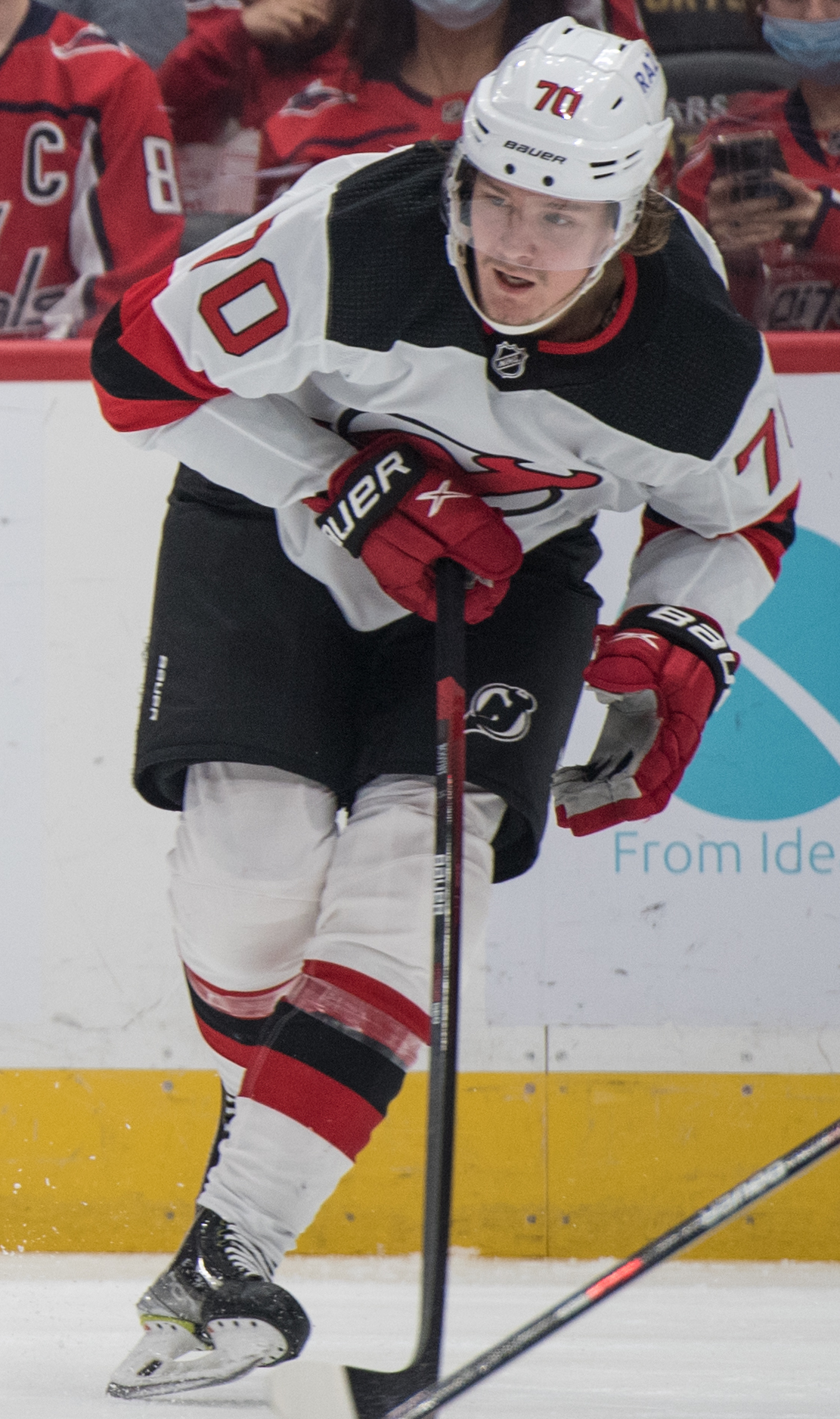
- Boqvist with the New Jersey Devils in 2022
- Born: 30 October 1998 (age 27) Falun, Sweden
- Height: 6 ft 0 in (183 cm)
- Weight: 191 lb (87 kg; 13 st 9 lb)
- Position: Centre
- Shoots: Left
- NHL team Former teams: New Jersey Devils; Brynäs IF; Boston Bruins; Florida Panthers
- NHL draft: 36th overall, 2017; New Jersey Devils
- Playing career: 2016–present

Jesper Boqvist (born 30 October 1998) is a Swedish professional ice hockey player who is a centre for the New Jersey Devils of the National Hockey League (NHL). Boqvist was selected 36th overall by the Devils in the 2017 NHL entry draft, and has also played in the NHL for the Boston Bruins and Florida Panthers. He won the Stanley Cup with the Panthers in 2025.

== Playing career ==
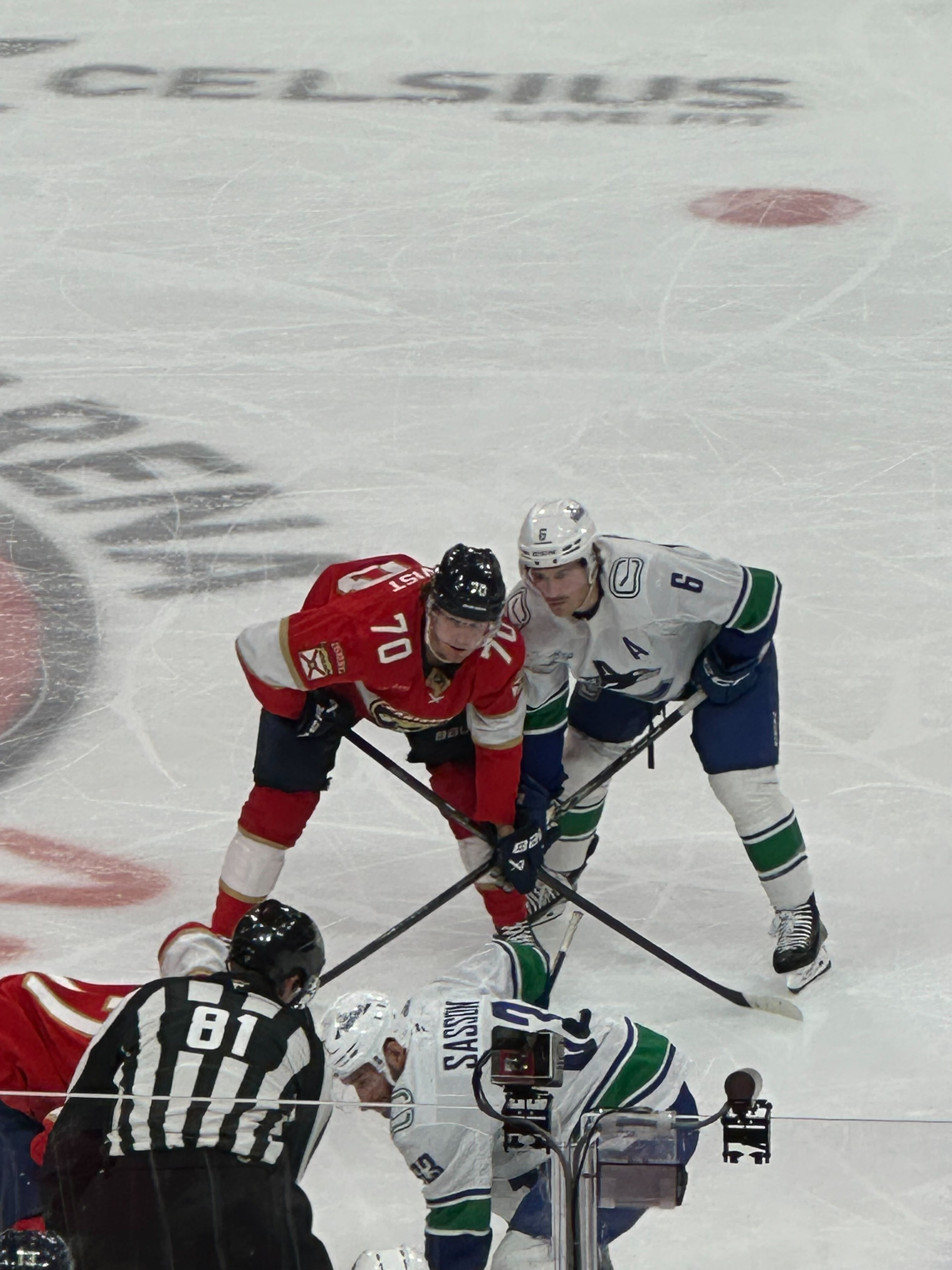
Boqvist waits for a faceoff with the Florida Panthers during a game against the Vancouver Canucks in November 2025

=== Brynäs IF ===
Boqvist made his Swedish Hockey League debut playing with Brynäs IF during the 2015–16 SHL season. On 16 May 2017, Boqvist agreed to extend his contract with Brynäs IF for a further two seasons through to 2019. Boqvist was drafted 36th overall, in the second round of the 2017 NHL entry draft, by the New Jersey Devils.

=== New Jersey Devils ===
On 10 June 2019, Boqvist signed a three-year, entry-level contract with the New Jersey Devils. Boqvist scored his first NHL career goal in a 3–2 loss against the Minnesota Wild on 26 November. Boqvist's goal, which tied the game 1–1 in the first period, caused controversy by the play of Wayne Simmonds. The Wild used its coach's challenge for the play, but the goal was allowed to stand. The NHL then issued a statement during the third period that the goal should not have been allowed.

On 22 July 2022, Boqvist agreed to his qualifying offer with the Devils, re-signing to a one-year, two-way contract for the 2022–23 season. He made a career high 70 appearances for the Devils and matched his previous season tally of 10 goals while adding 21 points to help the Devils return to the playoffs for the first time since 2018.

=== Boston Bruins ===
In the following off-season, Boqvist was not tendered a qualifying offer to remain with the Devils, releasing him as a free agent. On 12 July 2023, Boqvist agreed to a one-year, one-way $775,000 contract with the Boston Bruins for the 2023–24 season.

Boqvist did not make the NHL Bruins out of the pre-season, instead being placed on waivers with the intent of being assigned to the Bruins' American Hockey League (AHL) affiliate, the Providence Bruins. He cleared waivers and started the season on Providence. Boqvist was recalled to the NHL team on 26 October. He would play one game before being sent back to Providence. This occurred again on 12 December, where Boqvist was recalled, played one game, and then sent back down. He would be recalled a third time on 6 January 2024. This time, however, he would stick with the big club, finding a comfortable role on Boston's fourth line with his speed. Boqvist scored his first as a Bruin on 9 January, against the Arizona Coyotes. Boqvist scored his first NHL playoff point in game 1 of the first round series against the Toronto Maple Leafs, an assist on a goal by John Beecher.

=== Florida Panthers ===
After one year with Boston, Boqvist was not given a qualifying offer, making him an unrestricted free agent on 1 July 2024. On that day, Boqvist signed a one-year, $775,000 deal with reigning champions, the Florida Panthers.

=== Return to New Jersey ===
On 30 June 2026, Boqvist was traded back to the New Jersey Devils, alongside Evan Rodrigues and Ben Steeves, in exchange for Angus Crookshank and Jacob Markström.

== Personal life ==
Boqvist's younger brother Adam Boqvist is a defenceman for the New York Islanders.

== Career statistics ==
=== Regular season and playoffs ===
			Regular season					Playoffs
Season	Team	League	GP	G	A	Pts	PIM	GP	G	A	Pts	PIM
2014–15	Brynäs IF	J20	7	1	1	2	0	1	0	0	0	0
2015–16	Brynäs IF	J20	38	23	35	58	8	3	0	1	1	0
2015–16	Brynäs IF	SHL	8	0	1	1	2	2	0	0	0	0
2016–17	Brynäs IF	J20	15	10	5	20	6	—	—	—	—	—
2016–17	Brynäs IF	SHL	16	0	6	6	2	10	1	0	1	0
2016–17	Timrå IK	Allsv	19	3	9	12	0	—	—	—	—	—
2017–18	Brynäs IF	J20	4	0	5	5	2	—	—	—	—	—
2017–18	Brynäs IF	SHL	23	3	10	13	2	8	0	1	1	4
2018–19	Brynäs IF	SHL	51	13	22	35	14	—	—	—	—	—
2019–20	New Jersey Devils	NHL	35	4	0	4	8	—	—	—	—	—
2019–20	Binghamton Devils	AHL	19	8	3	11	12	—	—	—	—	—
2020–21	Timrå IK	Allsv	13	3	7	10	0	—	—	—	—	—
2020–21	New Jersey Devils	NHL	28	4	3	7	2	—	—	—	—	—
2020–21	Binghamton Devils	AHL	8	2	5	7	0	—	—	—	—	—
2021–22	Utica Comets	AHL	7	2	6	8	2	—	—	—	—	—
2021–22	New Jersey Devils	NHL	56	10	13	23	10	—	—	—	—	—
2022–23	New Jersey Devils	NHL	70	10	11	21	2	6	0	0	0	0
2023–24	Providence Bruins	AHL	31	10	13	23	10	—	—	—	—	—
2023–24	Boston Bruins	NHL	47	6	8	14	8	8	0	1	1	0
2024–25	Florida Panthers	NHL	78	12	11	23	14	13	2	3	5	0
2025–26	Florida Panthers	NHL	73	4	9	13	16	—	—	—	—	—
SHL totals			98	16	39	55	20	20	1	1	2	4
NHL totals			387	50	55	105	60	27	2	4	6	0

Medal record

Representing Sweden

Ice hockey

World Junior Championships
Silver medal – second place	2018 United States	

IIHF World U18 Championship
Silver medal – second place	2016 United States	

=== International ===
Year	Team	Event	Result	GP	G	A	Pts	PIM
2015	Sweden	IH18	2nd place, silver medalist(s)	5	0	1	1	4
2016	Sweden	U18	2nd place, silver medalist(s)	7	2	1	3	2
2018	Sweden	WJC	2nd place, silver medalist(s)	6	1	0	1	2
Junior totals				18	3	2	5	8

== Awards and honours ==
Award	Year	Ref
NHL
Stanley Cup champion	2025	
