= Anton Lundell =

Finnish ice hockey player (born 2001)

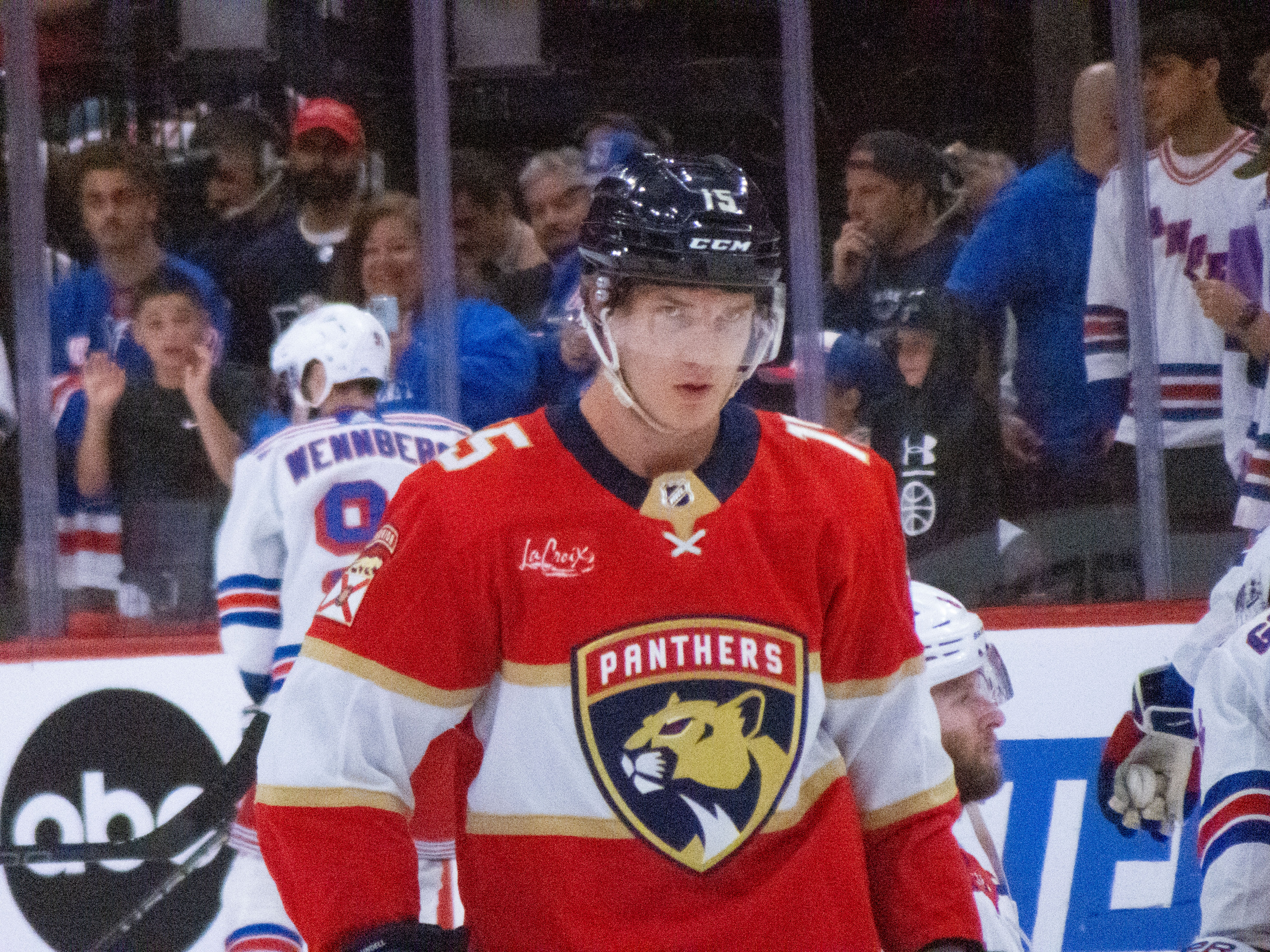
- Lundell with the Panthers in 2024
- Born: 3 October 2001 (age 25) Espoo, Finland
- Height: 6 ft 1 in (185 cm)
- Weight: 185 lb (84 kg; 13 st 3 lb)
- Position: Centre
- Shoots: Left
- NHL team Former teams: Florida Panthers; HIFK
- National team: Finland
- NHL draft: 12th overall, 2020; Florida Panthers
- Playing career: 2018–present

Anton Lundell (born 3 October 2001) is a Finnish professional ice hockey player who is a centre for the Florida Panthers of the National Hockey League (NHL). Lundell was considered a top prospect for the 2020 NHL entry draft, where he was selected 12th overall by the Panthers. Lundell won back-to-back Stanley Cups with the Panthers in 2024 and 2025.

== Playing career ==
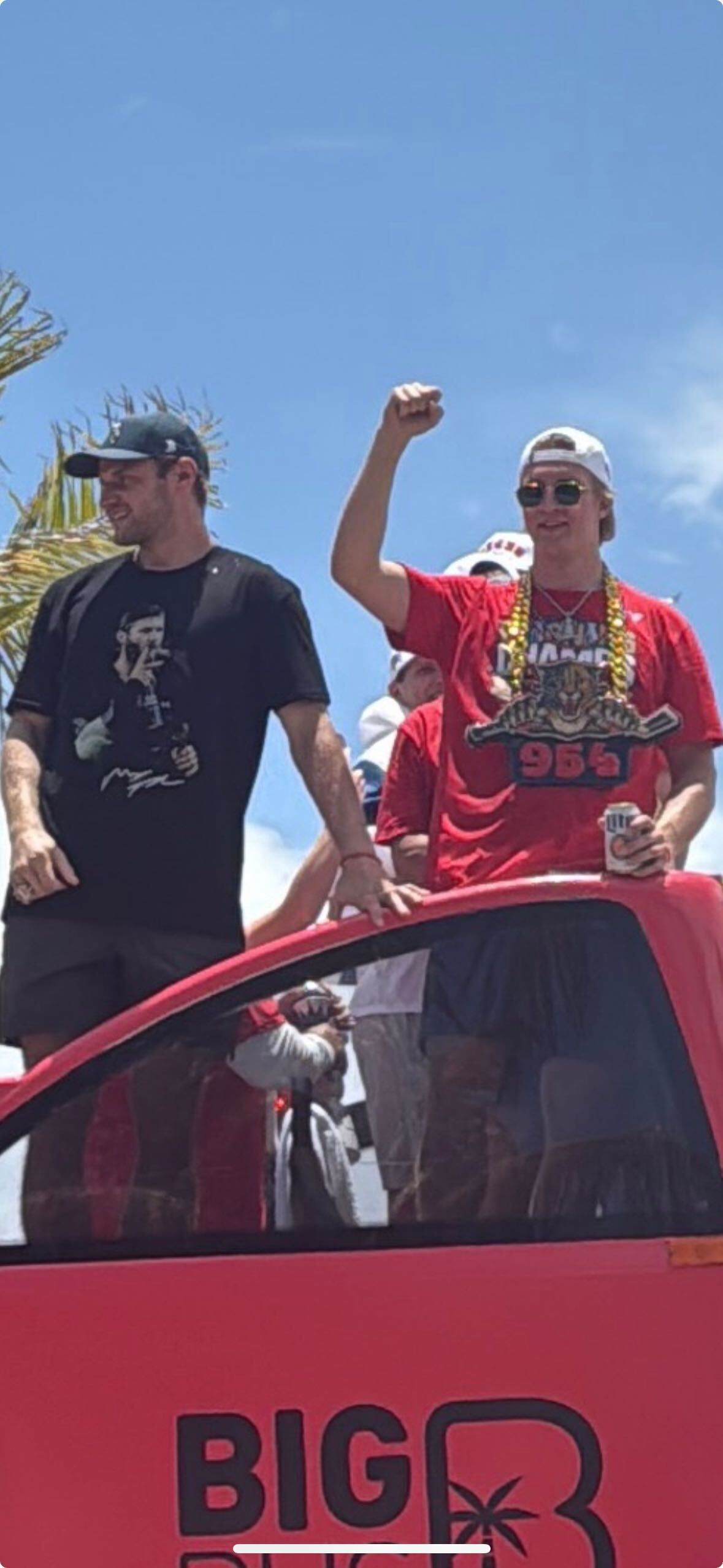
Lundell at the Panthers' 2025 Stanley Cup championship parade

Lundell first played as a youth as a 14-year old at the U16 level within the junior program of HIFK. Continuing his development through his fourth season with the club, Lundell made his professional debut registering nine goals and 19 points in 38 games during the 2018–19 Liiga season. Showing potential as a prominent two-way forward, Lundell followed up his rookie season by improving his offensive totals with 10 goals and 28 points in 44 regular season games before the 2019–20 season was cancelled due to the COVID-19 pandemic.

On 7 June 2021, Lundell signed a three-year, entry-level contract with the Florida Panthers. Lundell made his NHL debut on 14 October 2021, in Florida's game against the Pittsburgh Penguins. On 19 October 2021, Lundell scored his first NHL goal, against Tampa Bay Lightning goaltender Andrei Vasilevskiy in a 4–1 Panthers win. On 31 January 2022, Lundell recorded his first multi-point NHL game (five assists) in the Panthers' 8–4 win over the Columbus Blue Jackets. He was named the NHL Rookie of the Month for January 2022 after recording 17 points in 15 games.

In the 2023–24 season, Lundell reached the Stanley Cup Final with the Panthers for the second straight year, defeating the Edmonton Oilers in seven games and earning him a first career Stanley Cup championship. A week after winning the Stanley Cup, Lundell signed a six-year, $30 million contract extension with the Panthers. In the 2024–25 season, Lundell and the Panthers would eventually clinch a third consecutive 2025 trip and repeat as Stanley Cup champions for a second consecutive year, once again beating the Oilers in six games.

== International play ==
Medal record

Men's ice hockey

Representing Finland

Winter Olympics
Bronze medal – third place	2026 Milano Cortina	

World Championships
Gold medal – first place	2026 Switzerland	
Silver medal – second place	2021 Latvia	

World Junior Championships
Gold medal – first place	2019 Canada	
Bronze medal – third place	2021 Canada	

World U18 Championships
Gold medal – first place	2018 Russia	

Lundell won a gold medal with Finland under-18 team at the 2018 World U18 Championships, putting up six points in seven games. He won a gold medal with Finland junior team at the 2019 World Junior Championships, producing four points in seven games. After missing the 2020 World Juniors due to injury, Lundell returned for the 2021 World Juniors where he captained Finland to the bronze medal. He recorded six goals and ten points in seven games, ranking as one of the tournament's top three leading scorers. He also won a silver medal with Finland senior team at the 2021 World Championship. In 2026, Lundell was a member of the Finnish team that won the 2026 World Championship.

== Career statistics ==
=== Regular season and playoffs ===
			Regular season					Playoffs
Season	Team	League	GP	G	A	Pts	PIM	GP	G	A	Pts	PIM
2016–17	HIFK	FIN U18	29	3	12	15	10	2	1	1	2	0
2017–18	HIFK	FIN U18	10	3	7	10	22	5	1	4	5	8
2017–18	HIFK	FIN U20	22	8	12	20	6	9	1	1	2	4
2018–19	HIFK	FIN U20	10	6	9	15	6	—	—	—	—	—
2018–19	HIFK	Liiga	38	9	10	19	8	12	0	0	0	29
2019–20	HIFK	Liiga	44	10	18	28	18	—	—	—	—	—
2020–21	HIFK	Liiga	26	16	9	25	12	8	1	2	3	4
2021–22	Florida Panthers	NHL	65	18	26	44	18	9	1	0	1	2
2022–23	Florida Panthers	NHL	73	12	21	33	43	21	2	8	10	2
2023–24	Florida Panthers	NHL	78	13	22	35	46	24	3	14	17	12
2024–25	Florida Panthers	NHL	79	17	28	45	36	23	6	12	18	14
2025–26	Florida Panthers	NHL	64	18	26	44	34	—	—	—	—	—
Liiga totals			108	35	37	72	38	20	1	2	3	33
NHL totals			359	78	123	201	177	77	12	34	46	30

=== International ===
Year	Team	Event	Result	GP	G	A	Pts	PIM
2017	Finland	U17	6th	5	3	4	7	0
2018	Finland	WJC18	1st place, gold medalist(s)	7	2	4	6	2
2018	Finland	HG18	7th	4	1	1	2	16
2019	Finland	WJC	1st place, gold medalist(s)	7	1	3	4	0
2019	Finland	WJC18	7th	5	2	2	4	6
2021	Finland	WJC	3rd place, bronze medalist(s)	7	6	4	10	4
2021	Finland	WC	2nd place, silver medalist(s)	10	4	3	7	4
2025	Finland	4NF	4th	3	1	0	1	0
2026	Finland	OG	3rd place, bronze medalist(s)	5	1	1	2	4
2026	Finland	WC	1st place, gold medalist(s)	10	4	3	7	8
Junior totals				35	15	18	33	28
Senior totals				28	10	7	17	16

== Awards and honours ==
Award	Year	Ref
NHL
Stanley Cup champion	2024, 2025	

Awards and achievements
Preceded by Spencer Knight	Florida Panthers first-round draft pick 2020	Succeeded by Mackie Samoskevich
