= 2024 Stanley Cup Final =

2024 ice hockey championship series

	1	2	3	4	5	6	7	Total
Edmonton Oilers	0	1	3	8	5	5	1	3
Florida Panthers	3	4	4	1	3	1	2	4
- Location(s): Edmonton: Rogers Place; Sunrise: Amerant Bank Arena
- Coaches: Edmonton: Kris Knoblauch; Florida: Paul Maurice
- Captains: Edmonton: Connor McDavid; Florida: Aleksander Barkov
- National anthems: Edmonton: Robert Clark; Florida: Game 1: Madison Watkins (American); Jon Acosta (Canadian); Game 2: Gina Miles (American); Hannah Walpole (Canadian); Game 5: Brooke Alexx (American); Beverly Hodgson (Canadian); Game 7: Alanis Morissette
- Referees: Jean Hebert (2, 4, 6); Steve Kozari (1, 3, 5, 7); Dan O'Rourke (1, 3, 5, 7); Chris Rooney (2, 4, 6)
- Dates: June 8–24, 2024
- MVP: Connor McDavid (Oilers)
- Series-winning goal: Sam Reinhart (15:11, second)
- Networks: Canada: (English): CBC/Sportsnet/Sportsnet+ (French): TVA Sports; United States: (English): ABC/ESPN+
- Announcers: (CBC/SN) Chris Cuthbert and Craig Simpson (ABC) Sean McDonough and Ray Ferraro (NHL International) E. J. Hradek and Kevin Weekes

The 2024 Stanley Cup Final was the championship series of the National Hockey League's (NHL) 2023–24 season and the culmination of the 2024 Stanley Cup playoffs. The Eastern Conference champion Florida Panthers defeated the Western Conference champion Edmonton Oilers four games to three in the best-of-seven series, earning their first championship in their thirty year history.

The series began on June 8 and ended on June 24. The Panthers had home-ice advantage in the series as the team with the better regular season record, and this was the fifth consecutive Stanley Cup Final with a team from the state of Florida.

This was the furthest distance between two cities in an NHL championship series at 4,089 kilometres (2,541 miles), breaking the previous record of 4,023 km (2,500 mi), set in 2011 by the Vancouver Canucks and Boston Bruins. This was the first Final since 1945 to see a team force a seventh game after being down 3–0, with Florida becoming the first team since that occurrence to win the title in seven games after nearly surrendering a 3–0 series lead. This was also the first Final since 2018 without any overtime.

== Paths to the Final ==
=== Edmonton Oilers ===
This was Edmonton's eighth Final appearance. They had won the Stanley Cup five times, all of which came between 1984 and 1990 during their dynasty years. They lost their most recent Final appearance in 2006, against the Carolina Hurricanes in seven games.

During the off-season, the Oilers acquired forward Connor Brown and defenceman Ben Gleason via free agency. They also re-signed forward Mattias Janmark. The team started the season poorly, going 3–9–1 before firing head coach Jay Woodcroft and replacing him with Kris Knoblauch, under whom the team would rebound to make the playoffs. Edmonton signed free agent Corey Perry during the season, after Perry's contract with the Chicago Blackhawks was terminated for misconduct. Nearing the trade deadline, the team acquired centres Sam Carrick and Adam Henrique via a three-way trade; they also acquired defenceman Troy Stecher.

Captain Connor McDavid led the team in scoring with 132 points, and was third overall in the league. 100 of those points were assists, making him the fourth NHL player to record at least 100 assists in a season, and the first since Wayne Gretzky in 1990–91. Perry made his fifth Final appearance, previously winning with the Anaheim Ducks in 2007 and losing with the Dallas Stars in 2020, Montreal Canadiens in 2021, and Tampa Bay Lightning in 2022, respectively; this made him the first player to play in the Stanley Cup Final for five different teams.

The Oilers finished the regular season with 104 points via a 49–27–6 record, which gave them second place in the Pacific Division. In the first round of the playoffs, the Oilers defeated one of their rivals, the Los Angeles Kings, in five games. Edmonton then prevailed against the Vancouver Canucks in a seven-game victory in the second round. They then defeated the Dallas Stars in six games in the Western Conference final.

=== Florida Panthers ===
This was the second consecutive and third overall Final appearance for the Panthers. They lost both previous Final appearances, being swept in 1996 by the Colorado Avalanche and losing in five games to the Vegas Golden Knights in 2023.

During the off-season, the Panthers signed defencemen Oliver Ekman-Larsson and Dmitry Kulikov, forward Evan Rodrigues, and goaltender Anthony Stolarz in free agency. They also re-signed Eetu Luostarinen and traded for Steven Lorentz. At the trade deadline, the team acquired Vladimir Tarasenko, Magnus Hellberg, and Kyle Okposo. They also acquired Tobias Björnfot via waivers, and also re-signed Gustav Forsling shortly before the trade deadline.

Sam Reinhart led the team in scoring with 57 goals and 94 points.

The Panthers finished first in the Atlantic Division with 110 points via a 52–24–6 record. In the first round, they defeated their intra-state rival, the Tampa Bay Lightning, in five games. In the second round, they won in six games against the Boston Bruins in a rematch from the previous season's first round. In the Eastern Conference final, they faced the New York Rangers, who had won the Presidents' Trophy by having the best regular season record, and defeated them in six games.

== Game summaries ==
Numbers in parentheses indicate the player's total goals or assists in the 2024 playoffs up to that point.

=== Game one ===
June 8	Edmonton Oilers	0–3	Florida Panthers	Amerant Bank Arena	Recap

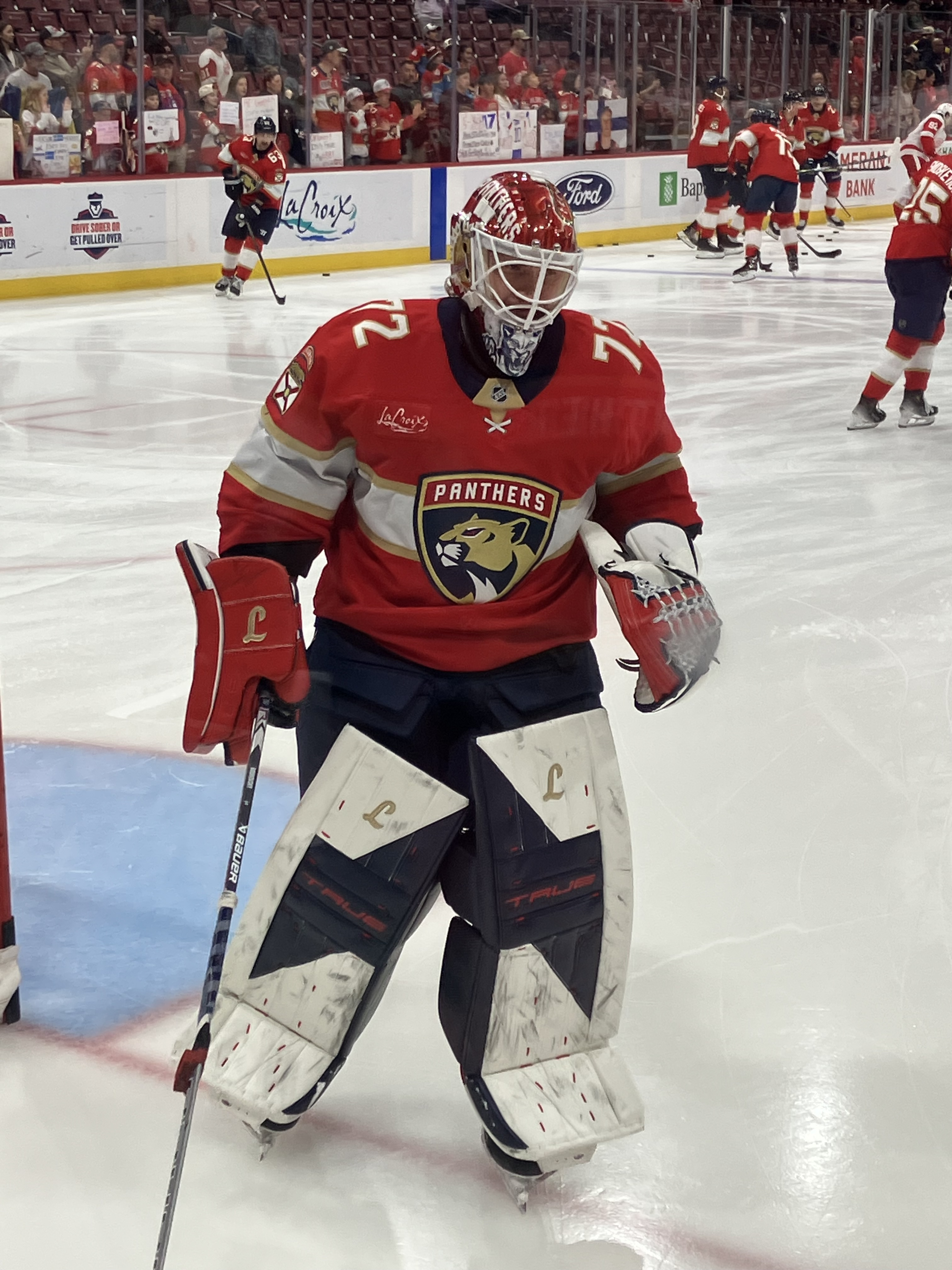
Sergei Bobrovsky recorded a shutout in game one.

In game one, Florida took a 1–0 lead four minutes into the first period when Carter Verhaeghe received a pass from Aleksander Barkov, beating Edmonton goaltender Stuart Skinner with a wrist shot. Two minutes into the second period, Evan Rodrigues scored to make it 2–0 after receiving a centering pass from Sam Bennett. Late in the third period, Edmonton pulled their goaltender for an extra attacker, but with five seconds remaining, Eetu Luostarinen scored an empty net goal to make the final score 3–0. Edmonton recorded 32 shots on goal in the game against Florida goaltender Sergei Bobrovsky, who recorded his second shutout of the postseason.

Scoring summary
Period	Team	Goal	Assist(s)	Time	Score
1st	FLA	Carter Verhaeghe (10)	Aleksander Barkov (12), Sam Reinhart (5)	03:59	1–0 FLA
2nd	FLA	Evan Rodrigues (4)	Sam Bennett (5), Brandon Montour (7)	02:16	2–0 FLA
3rd	FLA	Eetu Luostarinen (2) – en	Aleksander Barkov (13)	19:55	3–0 FLA
Penalty summary
Period	Team	Player	Penalty	Time	PIM
1st	EDM	Mattias Ekholm	Tripping	07:33	2:00
1st	FLA	Gustav Forsling	Tripping	14:53	2:00
1st	FLA	Carter Verhaeghe	Tripping	19:51	2:00
2nd	FLA	Kevin Stenlund	Roughing	10:24	2:00
2nd	FLA	Oliver Ekman-Larsson	Roughing	10:24	2:00
2nd	EDM	Connor Brown	Roughing	10:24	2:00
2nd	EDM	Mattias Janmark	Roughing	10:24	2:00
2nd	FLA	Sam Bennett	Interference	10:38	2:00
3rd	EDM	Corey Perry	Interference	06:47	2:00

Shots by period
Team	1	2	3	Total
EDM	12	13	7	32
FLA	4	8	6	18

=== Game two ===
June 10	Edmonton Oilers	1–4	Florida Panthers	Amerant Bank Arena	Recap

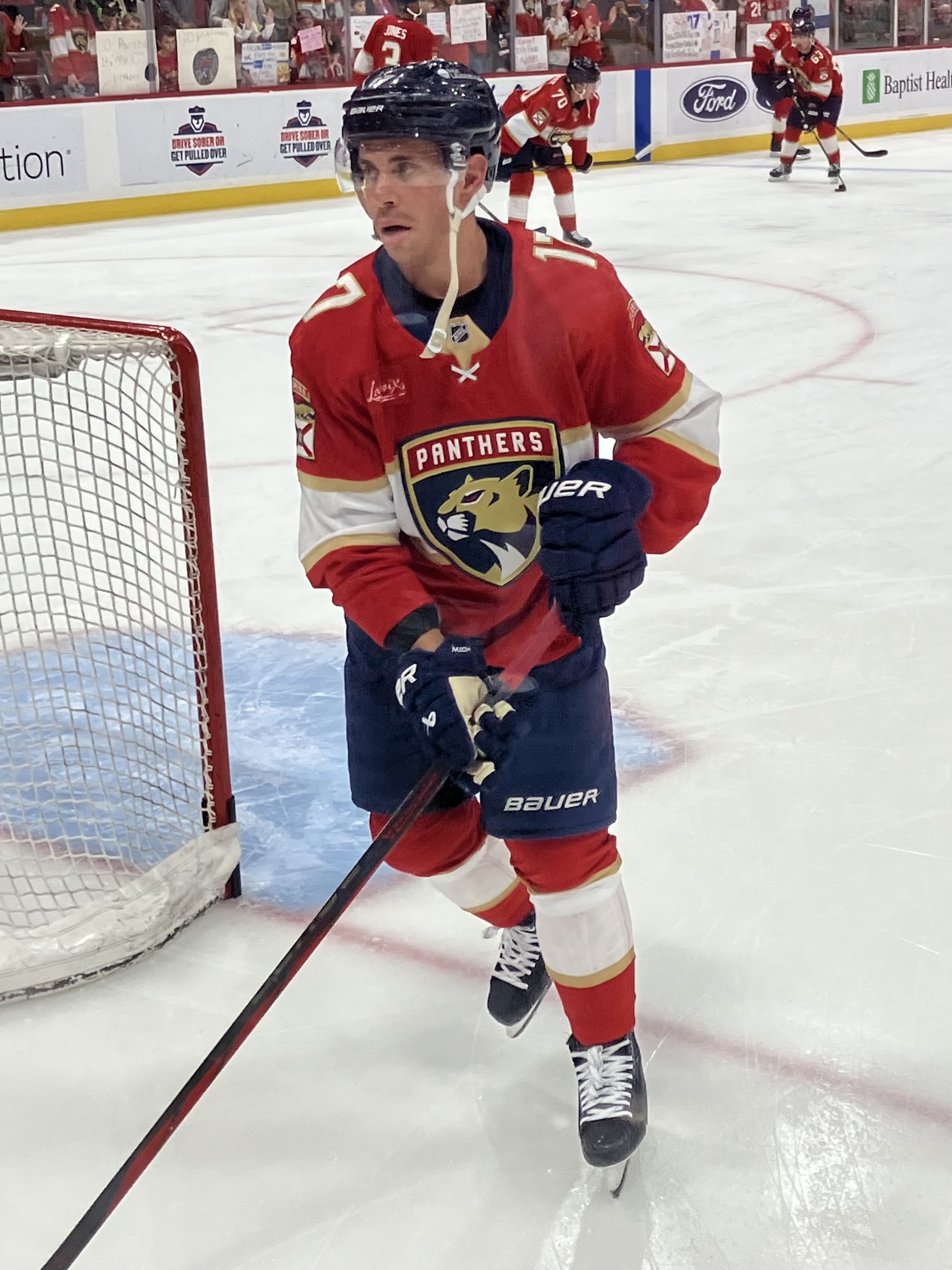
Evan Rodrigues scored two goals in game two.

During the first period of game two, Edmonton forward Warren Foegele hit Panthers forward Eetu Luostarinen with his knee, resulting in a match penalty as well as a game misconduct for Foegele. Luostarinen continued to play in the game. Whilst on the subsequent five-minute power play, defenceman Oliver Ekman-Larsson was penalized for tripping, resulting in a four-on-four, during which an Oilers rush resulted in their first shot from Mattias Ekholm going past goaltender Sergei Bobrovsky for a 1–0 lead. In the second period, Niko Mikkola tied the game for the Panthers, taking a drop-pass from Anton Lundell and snapping a shot past Edmonton goaltender Stuart Skinner. In third period, Panthers forward Evan Rodrigues broke the tie, picking off a clearing attempt by Oilers defenceman Evan Bouchard to put the puck past Skinner for a 2–1 lead. With less than ten minutes in the game, Oilers forward Leon Draisaitl was called for roughing and on the ensuing power play, Lundell passed to Rodrigues, who scored again to give the Panthers a 3–1 lead and end Edmonton's streak of 34 consecutive penalty kills. The Oilers then brought on an extra attacker, but Aaron Ekblad scored into the empty net for the Panthers, sealing a 4–1 victory for Florida.

Scoring summary
Period	Team	Goal	Assist(s)	Time	Score
1st	EDM	Mattias Ekholm (5)	Connor McDavid (27), Evan Bouchard (22)	11:17	1–0 EDM
2nd	FLA	Niko Mikkola (2)	Anton Lundell (10), Vladimir Tarasenko (4)	09:34	1–1
3rd	FLA	Evan Rodrigues (5)	Unassisted	03:11	2–1 FLA
3rd	FLA	Evan Rodrigues (6) – pp	Anton Lundell (11), Oliver Ekman-Larsson (4)	12:26	3–1 FLA
3rd	FLA	Aaron Ekblad (1) – en	Sam Bennett (6)	17:32	4–1 FLA
Penalty summary
Period	Team	Player	Penalty	Time	PIM
1st	FLA	Sam Bennett	Tripping	06:10	2:00
1st	EDM	Warren Foegele	Game misconduct	09:21	10:00
1st	EDM	Warren Foegele (served by Dylan Holloway)	Kneeing – major	09:21	5:00
1st	FLA	Oliver Ekman-Larsson	Tripping	10:58	2:00
1st	EDM	Evan Bouchard	Roughing	19:13	2:00
2nd	FLA	Matthew Tkachuk	Hooking	00:41	2:00
2nd	FLA	Carter Verhaeghe	Tripping	13:55	2:00
2nd	EDM	Evan Bouchard	Slashing	16:20	2:00
3rd	EDM	Leon Draisaitl	Roughing	10:32	2:00
3rd	EDM	Evander Kane	Unsportsmanlike conduct	13:14	2:00
3rd	FLA	Brandon Montour	Roughing	13:14	2:00
3rd	FLA	Oliver Ekman-Larsson	Delay of game (puck over glass)	15:06	2:00
3rd	EDM	Sam Carrick (served by Evander Kane)	Slashing	18:01	2:00
3rd	EDM	Sam Carrick	Misconduct	18:01	10:00
3rd	EDM	Vincent Desharnais	Misconduct	18:01	10:00

Shots by period
Team	1	2	3	Total
EDM	4	3	12	19
FLA	9	13	7	29

=== Game three ===
June 13	Florida Panthers	4–3	Edmonton Oilers	Rogers Place	Recap

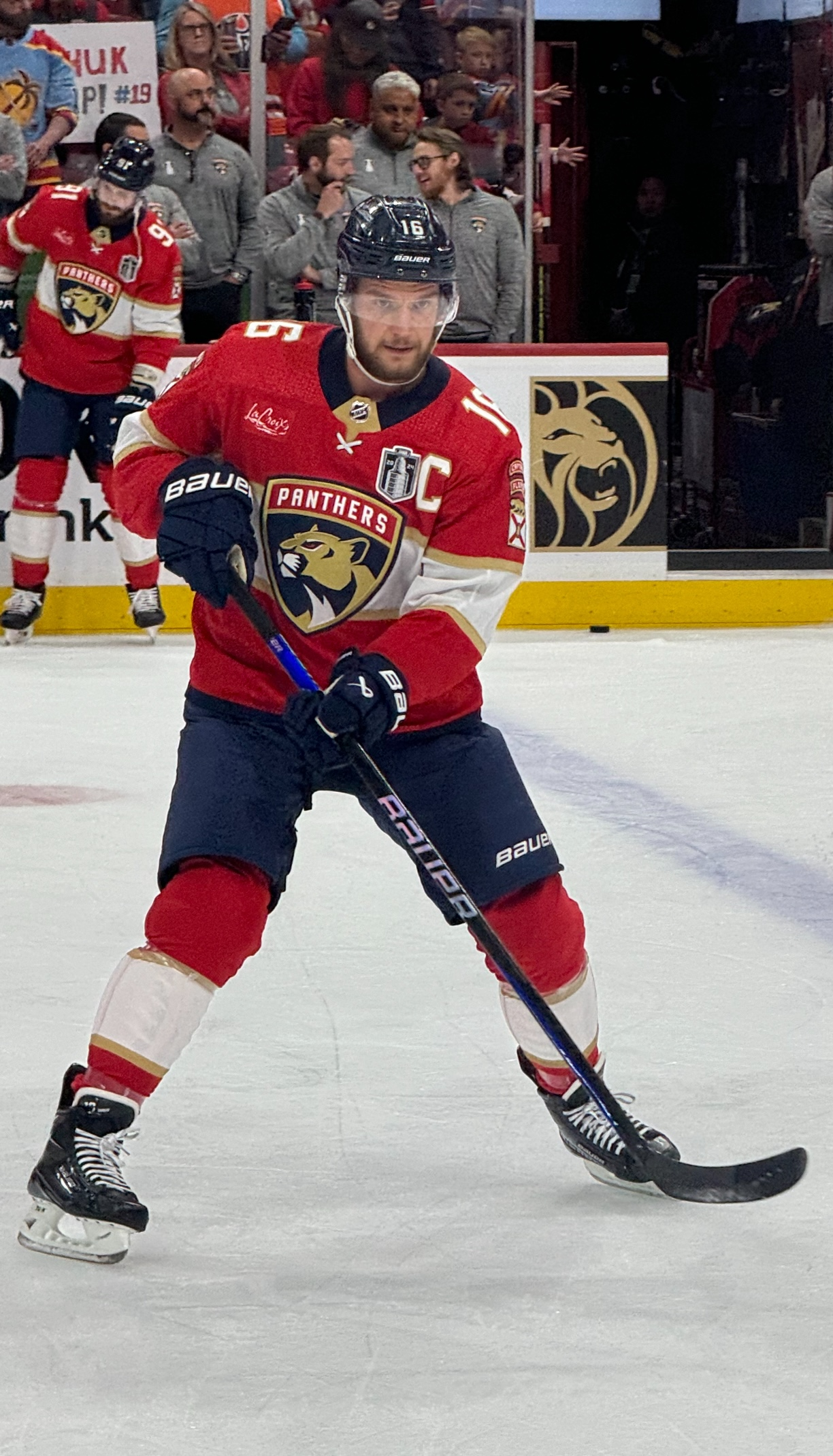
Panthers captain Aleksander Barkov, pictured during warmups for game seven, recorded the game-winning goal and two points in game three.

In game three, the Panthers opened the scoring in the first period when captain Aleksander Barkov picked the puck off Oilers defenceman Evan Bouchard, leading to a 3-on-2 rush in which Gustav Forsling shot toward the net and Sam Reinhart tipped the puck past Oilers goaltender Stuart Skinner. In the second period, Oilers forward Adam Henrique passed to Warren Foegele, who scored on a breakaway to tie the game 1–1. The Panthers regained the lead after Anton Lundell shot the puck around the boards and Skinner attempted to play the puck, but Eetu Luostarinen sent the puck to an open Vladimir Tarasenko who wristed the puck into the net. Florida then made it 3–1, after Sam Bennett and Matthew Tkachuk forced a turnover in the offensive zone, leading to a Tkachuk-assisted Bennett goal. Barkov shortly made it 4–1, snapping a shot past Skinner after receiving a pass from Evan Rodrigues. In the third period, Philip Broberg brought the deficit for the Oilers down to two when his snap shot went past Panthers goaltender Sergei Bobrovsky. The Oilers then lowered the deficit to one goal when Brett Kulak's shot was deflected in by centre Ryan McLeod. The Panthers ultimately defended their one-goal lead en route to a 4–3 victory, taking a 3–0 series lead.

Scoring summary
Period	Team	Goal	Assist(s)	Time	Score
1st	FLA	Sam Reinhart (9)	Gustav Forsling (8), Aleksander Barkov (14)	18:58	1–0 FLA
2nd	EDM	Warren Foegele (2)	Adam Henrique (3)	01:49	1–1
2nd	FLA	Vladimir Tarasenko (4)	Eetu Luostarinen (6), Anton Lundell (12)	09:12	2–1 FLA
2nd	FLA	Sam Bennett (7)	Matthew Tkachuk (15)	13:57	3–1 FLA
2nd	FLA	Aleksander Barkov (7)	Evan Rodrigues (6), Sam Reinhart (6)	15:31	4–1 FLA
3rd	EDM	Philip Broberg (2)	Connor McDavid (28), Darnell Nurse (4)	06:02	4–2 FLA
3rd	EDM	Ryan McLeod (2)	Brett Kulak (5), Connor McDavid (29)	12:25	4–3 FLA
Penalty summary
Period	Team	Player	Penalty	Time	PIM
1st	EDM	Ryan Nugent-Hopkins	Interference	04:30	2:00
1st	FLA	Aleksander Barkov	Delay of game (puck over glass)	09:55	2:00
1st	FLA	Brandon Montour	Slashing	09:21	5:00
1st	EDM	Brett Kulak	Roughing	18:31	2:00
1st	FLA	Matthew Tkachuk	Roughing	18:31	2:00
2nd	FLA	Sam Bennett	Hooking	18:08	2:00
2nd	EDM	Corey Perry	Interference	18:08	2:00
2nd	FLA	Aaron Ekblad	Hooking	19:39	2:00
3rd	None				

Shots by period
Team	1	2	3	Total
FLA	10	8	5	23
EDM	13	16	6	35

=== Game four ===
June 15	Florida Panthers	1–8	Edmonton Oilers	Rogers Place	Recap

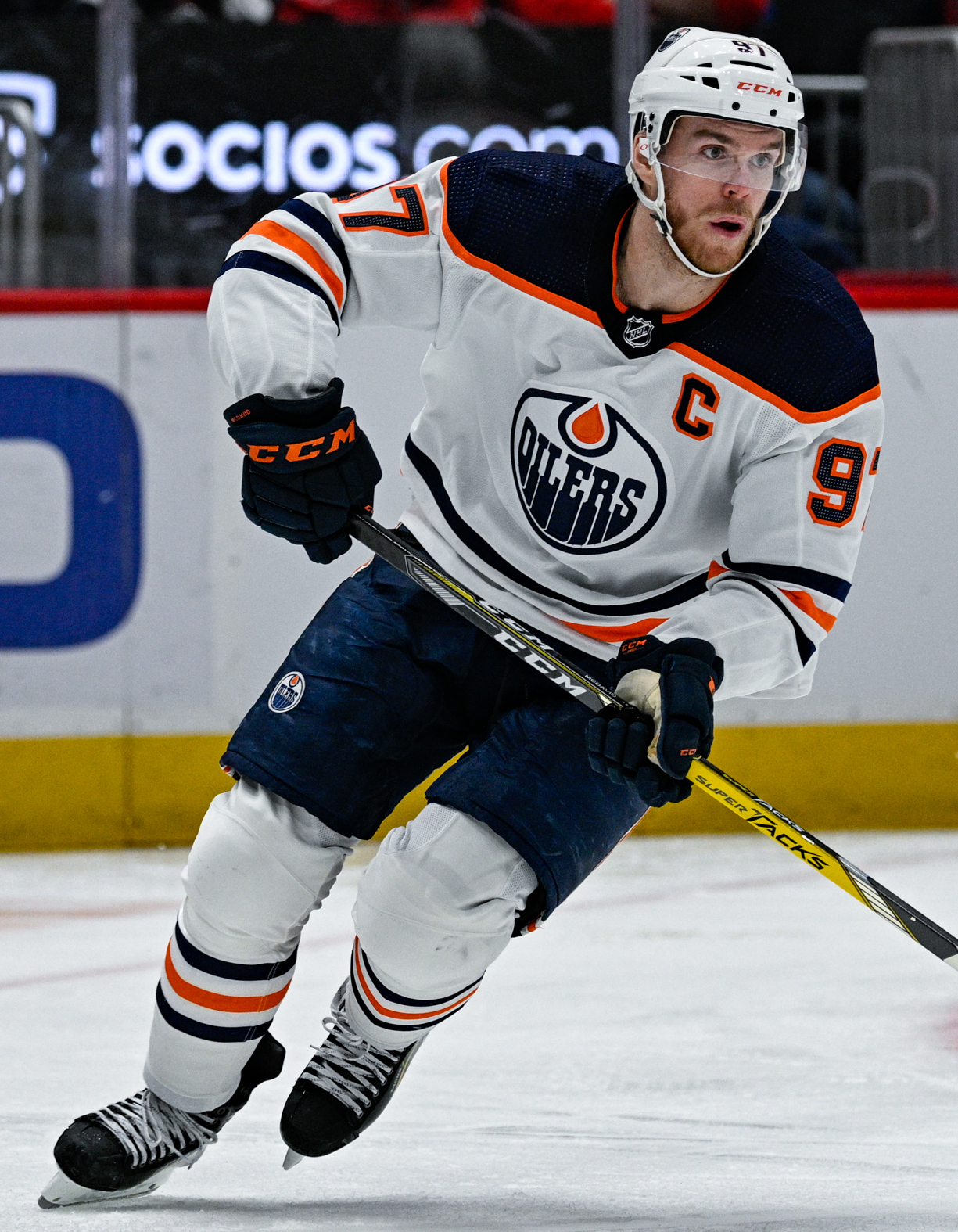
Oilers captain Connor McDavid recorded a goal and four points in game four, in the process breaking Wayne Gretzky's single-playoff assist record.

The Oilers began the scoring in the first period of game four while on the penalty kill, with forward Connor Brown passing to Mattias Janmark on a shorthanded rush for a goal. Edmonton then gained a two-goal lead when an offensive zone rush allowed Janmark to send the puck toward the net, with Adam Henrique tipping it in to make it 2–0. The Panthers got on the board with a goal from forward Vladimir Tarasenko, tipping in a shot from defenceman Gustav Forsling. With 5:12 left in the first period, the Oilers regained a two-goal lead when Leon Draisaitl passed to Dylan Holloway, who shot backhand on Panthers goaltender Sergei Bobrovsky for a 3–1 lead. In the second period, Oilers captain Connor McDavid made it 4–1, snapping a shot past Bobrovsky. The Oilers then made it 5–1 when McDavid dropped a pass to defenceman Darnell Nurse, who shot it past Bobrovsky, leading to Panthers backup goaltender Anthony Stolarz entering the game. The Oilers were then given a 5-on-3 power play, during which Ryan Nugent-Hopkins scored to make the score 6–1. In the third period, the Oilers continued their rout, with both Holloway and Ryan McLeod scoring to push the score to 8–1, forcing a fifth game and avoiding becoming the first team since 1998 to be swept in the Stanley Cup Final. With an assist on the Holloway goal, Connor McDavid set the single season playoff record for most assists in one playoff year, breaking the record previously held by Wayne Gretzky in 1988.

Scoring summary
Period	Team	Goal	Assist(s)	Time	Score
1st	EDM	Mattias Janmark (3) – sh	Connor Brown (4)	03:11	1–0 EDM
1st	EDM	Adam Henrique (3)	Mattias Janmark (3), Mattias Ekholm (4)	07:48	2–0 EDM
1st	FLA	Vladimir Tarasenko (5)	Gustav Forsling (9)	11:26	2–1 EDM
1st	EDM	Dylan Holloway (4)	Leon Draisaitl (19), Brett Kulak (6)	14:48	3–1 EDM
2nd	EDM	Connor McDavid (6)	Zach Hyman (5), Evan Bouchard (23)	01:13	4–1 EDM
2nd	EDM	Darnell Nurse (1)	Connor McDavid (30), Zach Hyman (6)	04:59	5–1 EDM
2nd	EDM	Ryan Nugent-Hopkins (7) – pp	Leon Draisaitl (20), Connor McDavid (31)	13:03	6–1 EDM
3rd	EDM	Dylan Holloway (5)	Connor McDavid (32), Corey Perry (2)	14:11	7–1 EDM
3rd	EDM	Ryan McLeod (3)	Dylan Holloway (2), Warren Foegele (3)	16:41	8–1 EDM
Penalty summary
Period	Team	Player	Penalty	Time	PIM
1st	EDM	Darnell Nurse	Tripping	01:53	2:00
1st	FLA	Bench (served by Evan Rodrigues)	Too many men on the ice	04:12	2:00
2nd	FLA	Oliver Ekman-Larsson	Slashing	08:40	2:00
2nd	FLA	Matthew Tkachuk	Roughing	11:35	2:00
2nd	FLA	Sam Bennett	Roughing	11:35	2:00
3rd	EDM	Mattias Janmark	Tripping	00:36	2:00
3rd	EDM	Darnell Nurse	Cross-checking	06:51	2:00
3rd	FLA	Aaron Ekblad	Slashing	09:16	2:00
3rd	EDM	Corey Perry	Slashing	11:52	2:00
3rd	FLA	Kyle Okposo	Elbowing	16:59	2:00

Shots by period
Team	1	2	3	Total
FLA	14	4	15	33
EDM	12	17	9	36

=== Game five ===
June 18	Edmonton Oilers	5–3	Florida Panthers	Amerant Bank Arena	Recap

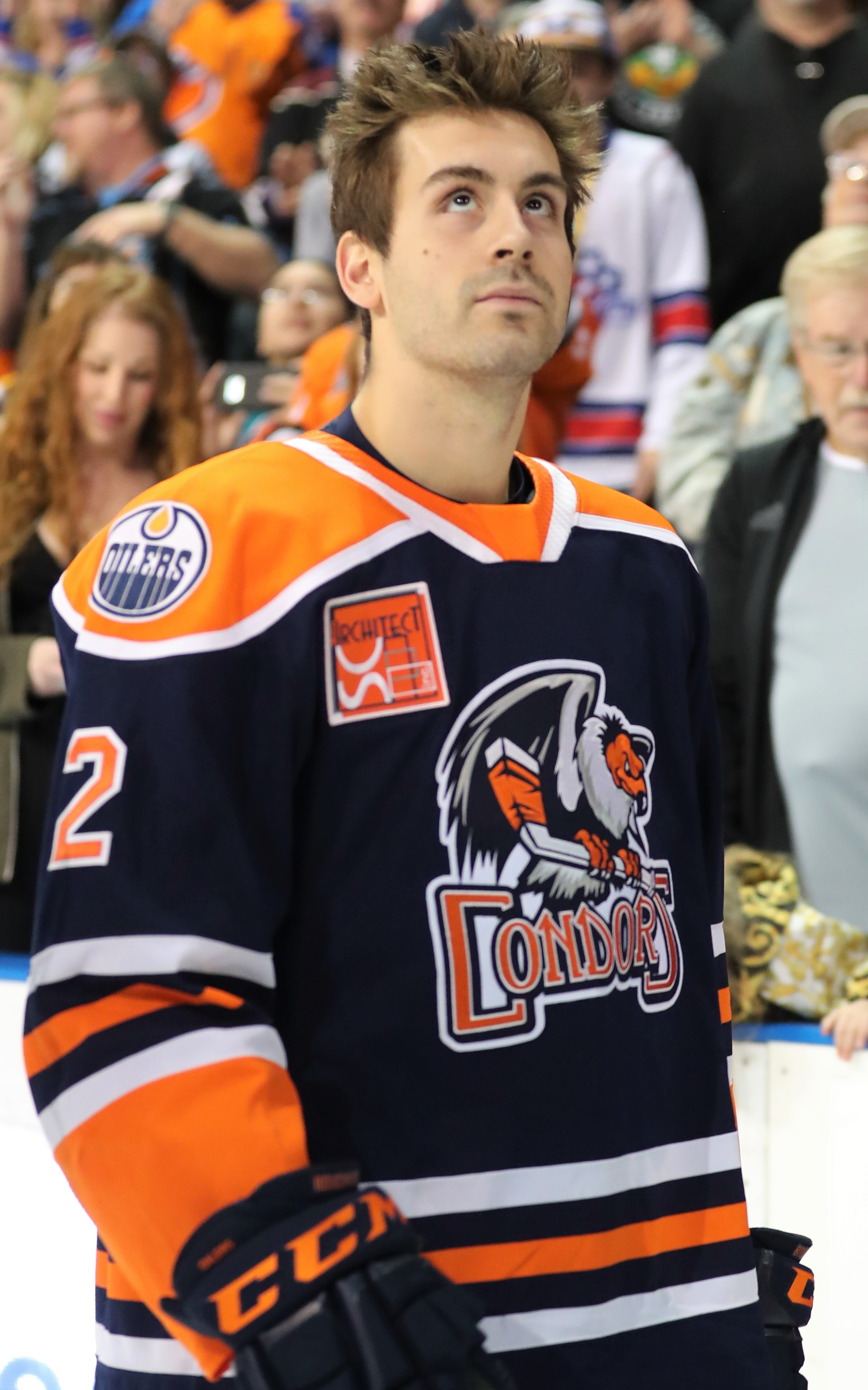
Evan Bouchard (pictured with the Bakersfield Condors) recorded three assists in game 5.

In game five, Connor Brown scored the initial goal for the Oilers in the first period, with his backhand shot beating goaltender Sergei Bobrovsky for a shorthanded goal. In the second period, the Oilers gained a two-goal lead when Zach Hyman scored on the power play. Three minutes later, Oilers forward Warren Foegele passed to captain Connor McDavid, whose wrist shot beat Bobrovsky for a 3–0 lead. The Panthers got on the board less than two minutes later when forward Evan Rodrigues passed to Matthew Tkachuk, who scored to cut the deficit to two goals. Following a slashing penalty by Rodrigues, the Oilers regained a three-goal lead when McDavid passed to Corey Perry, who scored his first goal of the playoffs. Fourteen seconds later, the Panthers brought the deficit back to two goals when Brandon Montour passed to Rodrigues, who scored to make it 4–2. In the third period, Florida defenceman Oliver Ekman-Larsson brought the score to 4–3, snapping the puck past Edmonton goalie Stuart Skinner. In the final 30 seconds, and with an extra attacker out for Florida, the Oilers cleared the puck toward the empty net, but Tkachuk dove to sweep the puck away. McDavid recovered the puck and scored into the empty net to give Edmonton a 5–3 victory, forcing a sixth game. Edmonton became the first team since the 2011–12 New Jersey Devils and the fourth overall to force a sixth game after being down 3–0 in the Final.

Scoring summary
Period	Team	Goal	Assist(s)	Time	Score
1st	EDM	Connor Brown (2) – sh	Unassisted	05:30	1–0 EDM
2nd	EDM	Zach Hyman (15) – pp	Evan Bouchard (24), Connor McDavid (33)	01:58	2–0 EDM
2nd	EDM	Connor McDavid (7)	Warren Foegele (4), Evan Bouchard (25)	05:00	3–0 EDM
2nd	FLA	Matthew Tkachuk (6)	Evan Rodrigues (7)	06:53	3–1 EDM
2nd	EDM	Corey Perry (1)	Connor McDavid (34), Evan Bouchard (26)	11:54	4–1 EDM
2nd	FLA	Evan Rodrigues (7)	Brandon Montour (8), Sam Bennett (7)	12:08	4–2 EDM
3rd	FLA	Oliver Ekman-Larsson (2)	Matthew Tkachuk (16)	04:04	4–3 EDM
3rd	EDM	Connor McDavid (8) – en	Unassisted	19:41	5–3 EDM
Penalty summary
Period	Team	Player	Penalty	Time	PIM
1st	EDM	Brett Kulak	High-sticking	04:47	2:00
1st	FLA	Aleksander Barkov	Cross checking	09:04	2:00
1st	EDM	Ryan Nugent-Hopkins	Hooking	10:07	2:00
1st	FLA	Niko Mikkola	Interference	20:00	2:00
2nd	FLA	Kyle Okposo	Hooking	10:02	2:00
2nd	FLA	Evan Rodrigues	Slashing	13:35	2:00
2nd	EDM	Zach Hyman	Interference	14:26	2:00
3rd	EDM	Dylan Holloway	Hooking	00:36	2:00
3rd	FLA	Matthew Tkachuk	Embellishment	06:19	2:00
3rd	FLA	Dmitry Kulikov	Tripping	12:28	2:00

Shots by period
Team	1	2	3	Total
EDM	10	10	4	24
FLA	6	16	10	32

=== Game six ===
June 21	Florida Panthers	1–5	Edmonton Oilers	Rogers Place	Recap

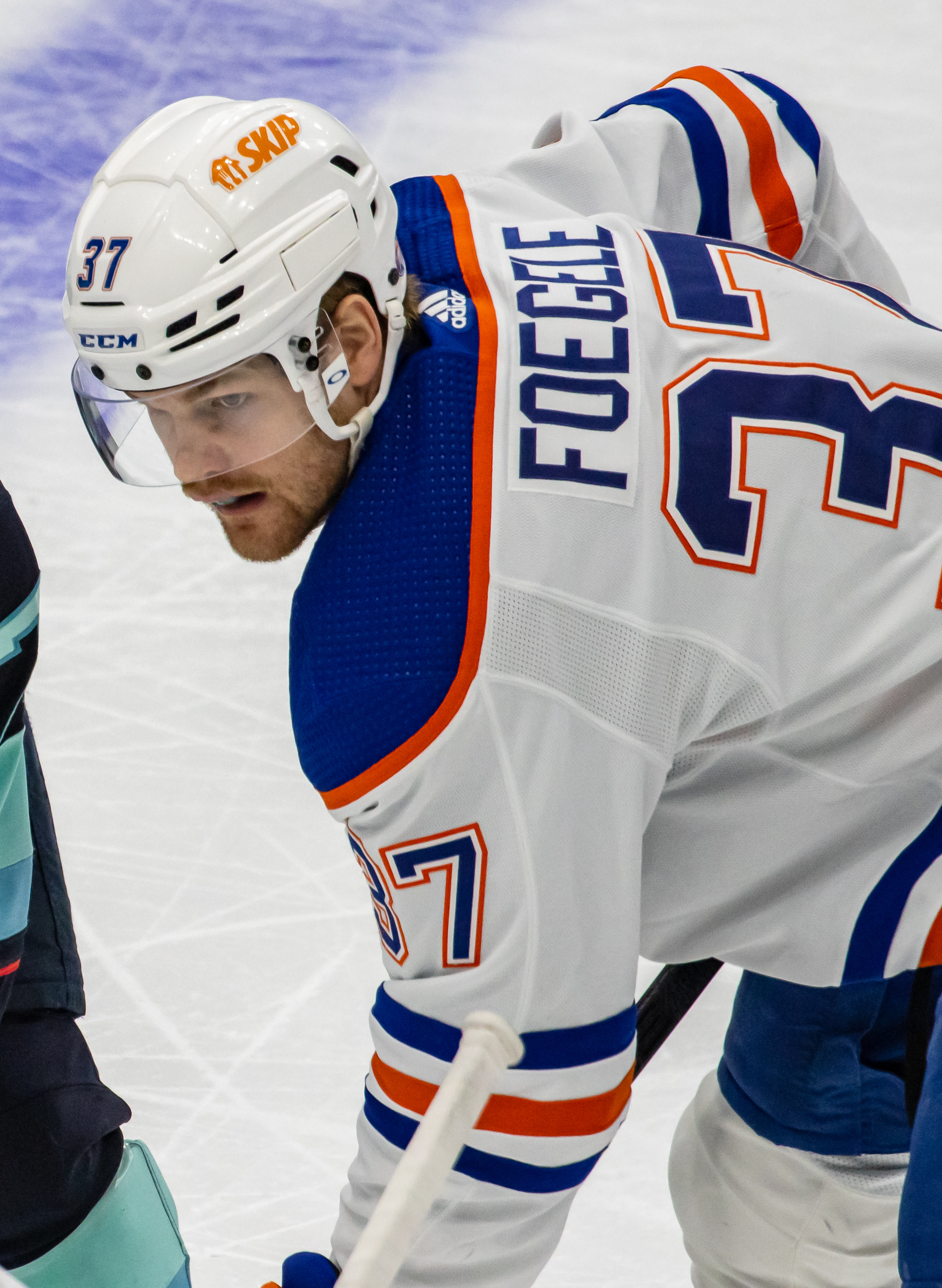
Warren Foegele scored the game-opening goal and an assist in game six.

The Oilers began the scoring in the first period of game six, with centre Leon Draisaitl passing to right wing Warren Foegele who snapped the puck past Florida goaltender Sergei Bobrovsky. Florida was limited to only two shots in the first period. In the second period, Mattias Ekholm sent a stretch pass to Mattias Janmark, who then passed to Adam Henrique; Henrique subsequently beat Bobrovsky with a wrist shot for a 2–0 Oilers lead. Ten seconds later, the Panthers had a goal by Aleksander Barkov disallowed when replay showed Sam Reinhart was offside on the play. Zach Hyman then made it 3–0 for Edmonton when he scored backhand on a breakaway chance. The Panthers were able to get on the board in the third period when Barkov dangled the puck around goaltender Stuart Skinner. The Oilers held off the Panthers for the remainder of the game, with Ryan McLeod and Darnell Nurse each scoring an empty net goal for a 5–1 victory. Edmonton became the tenth NHL team to force a seventh game after trailing 3–0 in the series, the third team to do so in the Final, and the first in the Final since the Detroit Red Wings did so in 1945.

Scoring summary
Period	Team	Goal	Assist(s)	Time	Score
1st	EDM	Warren Foegele (3)	Leon Draisaitl (21), Brett Kulak (7)	07:27	1–0 EDM
2nd	EDM	Adam Henrique (4)	Mattias Janmark (4), Mattias Ekholm (5)	00:46	2–0 EDM
2nd	EDM	Zach Hyman (16)	Ryan Nugent-Hopkins (15)	18:20	3–0 EDM
3rd	FLA	Aleksander Barkov (8)	Carter Verhaeghe (9), Dmitry Kulikov (1)	01:28	3–1 EDM
3rd	EDM	Ryan McLeod (4) – en	Warren Foegele (5)	16:45	4–1 EDM
3rd	EDM	Darnell Nurse (4) – en	Stuart Skinner (1), Philip Broberg (1)	16:57	5–1 EDM
Penalty summary
Period	Team	Player	Penalty	Time	PIM
1st	EDM	Mattias Janmark	Slashing	04:47	2:00
1st	FLA	Eetu Luostarinen	Slashing	15:23	2:00
2nd	EDM	Mattias Janmark	Roughing	03:05	2:00
2nd	FLA	Matthew Tkachuk	Roughing	03:05	2:00
2nd	EDM	Connor McDavid	Interference	14:26	2:00
3rd	EDM	Derek Ryan	High-sticking	06:15	2:00
3rd	FLA	Kevin Stenlund	Tripping	11:30	2:00
3rd	FLA	Ryan Lomberg	Misconduct	19:51	10:00
3rd	EDM	Ryan McLeod	Misconduct	19:51	10:00

Shots by period
Team	1	2	3	Total
FLA	2	11	8	21
EDM	11	4	6	21

=== Game seven ===
June 24	Edmonton Oilers	1–2	Florida Panthers	Amerant Bank Arena	Recap

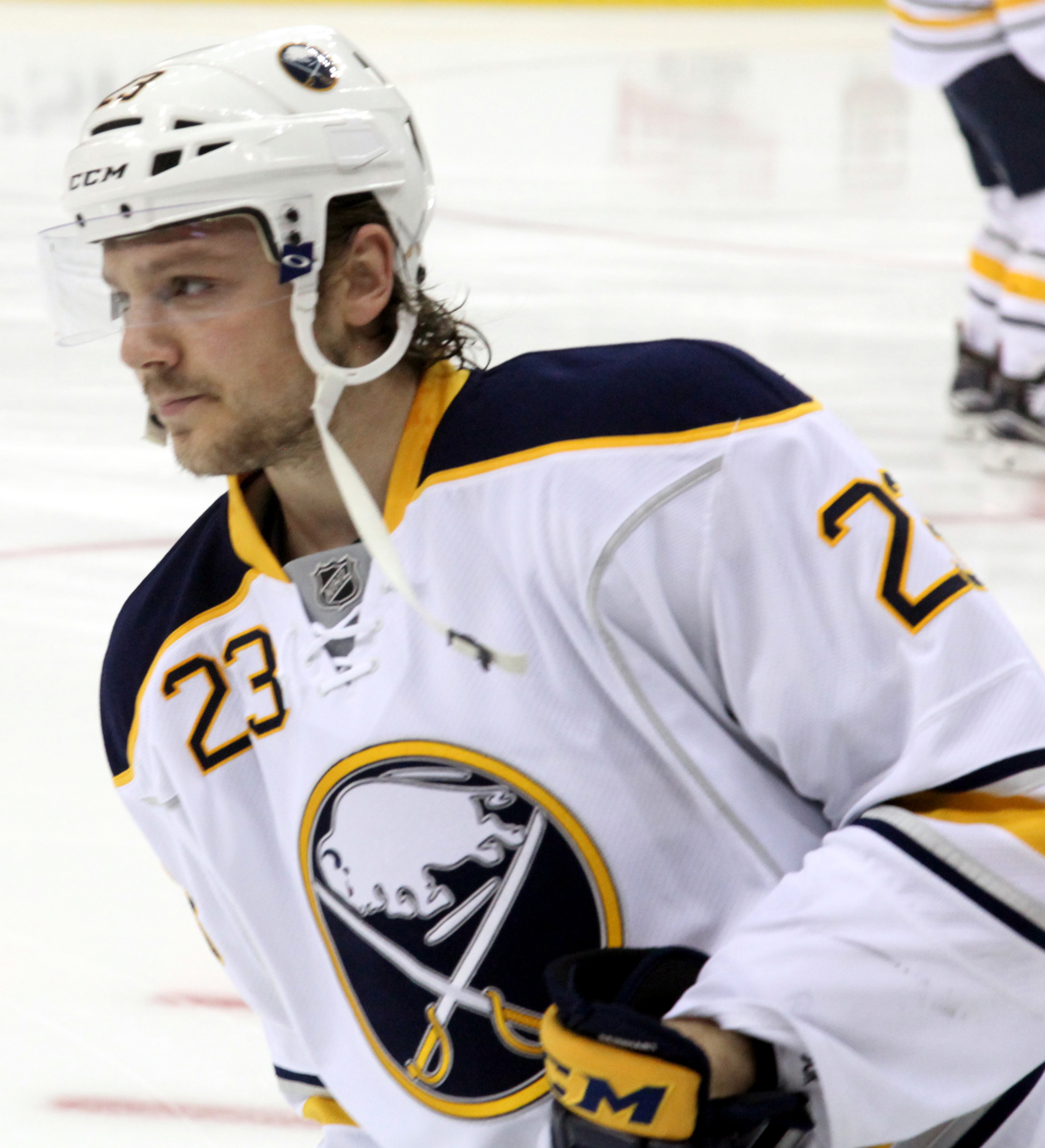
Sam Reinhart (pictured with the Buffalo Sabres) scored the Cup-winning goal in game seven.

In game seven, the Panthers began the scoring when forward Evan Rodrigues shot toward the goal, with Carter Verhaeghe deflecting the puck past Oilers goaltender Stuart Skinner. Oilers forward Mattias Janmark then tied the game, scoring on the breakaway after receiving a stretch pass from defenceman Cody Ceci. In the second period, after a narrow save by Bobrovsky, Dmitry Kulikov got the puck to Florida in the corner, Verhaeghe passed the puck to forward Sam Reinhart, who fired a wrist shot past Skinner for a 2–1 lead. The Panthers defended their lead into the third period, with goaltender Sergei Bobrovsky stopping the remaining nine shots to win their first Stanley Cup.

Panthers captain Aleksander Barkov became the first Finnish-born captain to win the Cup, while the Panthers became the first team to win game seven of the Final at home since the Carolina Hurricanes did so in 2006, also against the Oilers.

Oilers captain Connor McDavid was awarded the Conn Smythe Trophy as the most valuable player of the playoffs, becoming the first player since Jean-Sébastien Giguère in 2003 and the sixth overall to be awarded the Conn Smythe despite losing the Final. McDavid also joined Reggie Leach in 1976 as the only skaters to achieve this feat.

Scoring summary
Period	Team	Goal	Assist(s)	Time	Score
1st	FLA	Carter Verhaeghe (11)	Evan Rodrigues (8), Anton Lundell (14)	04:27	1–0 FLA
1st	EDM	Mattias Janmark (4)	Cody Ceci (8)	06:44	1–1
2nd	FLA	Sam Reinhart (10)	Carter Verhaeghe (10), Dmitry Kulikov (2)	15:11	2–1 FLA
3rd	None				
Penalty summary
Period	Team	Player	Penalty	Time	PIM
1st	EDM	Warren Foegele	High-sticking	02:21	2:00
2nd	FLA	Matthew Tkachuk	Tripping	03:22	2:00
3rd	EDM	Evan Bouchard	High-sticking	03:23	2:00

Shots by period
Team	1	2	3	Total
EDM	6	9	9	24
FLA	7	10	4	21

== Team rosters ==
Years indicated in boldface under the "Final appearance" column signify that the player won the Stanley Cup in the given year.

=== Edmonton Oilers ===
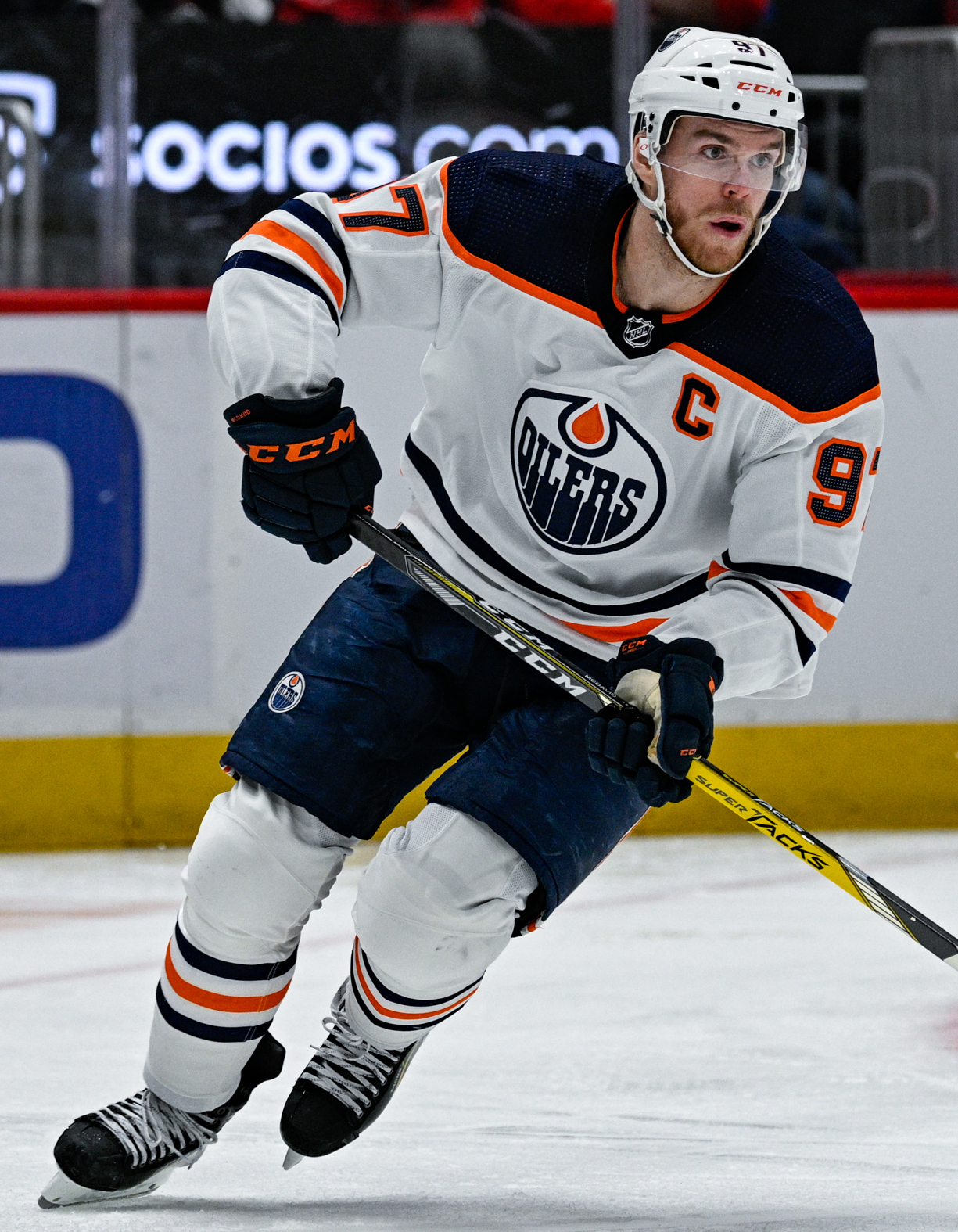
Connor McDavid captained the Oilers to their eighth Final appearance and first since 2006.

#	Nat	Player	Position	Hand	Age	Acquired	Place of birth	Final appearance
2	(Canada)	Evan Bouchard	D	R	24	2018	Oakville, Ontario	first
86	(Sweden)	Philip Broberg	D	L	22	2019	Orebro, Sweden	first
28	(Canada)	Connor Brown	RW	R	30	2023	Etobicoke, Ontario	first
39	(Canada)	Sam Carrick	C	R	32	2024	Markham, Ontario	first
5	(Canada)	Cody Ceci	D	R	30	2021	Ottawa, Ontario	first
73	(Canada)	Vincent Desharnais	D	R	28	2016	Laval, Quebec	first
29	(Germany)	Leon Draisaitl – **A**	C	L	28	2014	Cologne, Germany	first
14	(Sweden)	Mattias Ekholm	D	L	34	2023	Borlange, Sweden	second (2017)
37	(Canada)	Warren Foegele	LW	L	28	2021	Markham, Ontario	first
19	(Canada)	Adam Henrique	C	L	34	2024	Brantford, Ontario	second (2012)
55	(Canada)	Dylan Holloway	LW	L	22	2020	Calgary, Alberta	first
18	(Canada)	Zach Hyman	LW	R	32	2021	Toronto, Ontario	first
13	(Sweden)	Mattias Janmark	C	L	31	2022	Danderyd, Sweden	second (2020)
91	(Canada)	Evander Kane	LW	L	32	2022	Vancouver, British Columbia	first
27	(Canada)	Brett Kulak	D	L	30	2022	Stony Plain, Alberta	second (2021)
97	(Canada)	Connor McDavid – **C**	C	L	27	2015	Richmond Hill, Ontario	first
71	(Canada)	Ryan McLeod	C	L	24	2018	Mississauga, Ontario	first
93	(Canada)	Ryan Nugent-Hopkins – **A**	C	L	31	2011	Burnaby, British Columbia	first
25	(Canada)	Darnell Nurse – **A**	D	L	29	2013	Hamilton, Ontario	first
90	(Canada)	Corey Perry	RW	R	39	2024	New Liskeard, Ontario	fifth (**2007**, 2020, 2021, 2022)
30	(Canada)	Calvin Pickard	G	L	32	2022	Moncton, New Brunswick	first
10	(United States)	Derek Ryan	C	R	37	2021	Spokane, Washington	first
74	(Canada)	Stuart Skinner	G	L	25	2017	Edmonton, Alberta	first

=== Florida Panthers ===
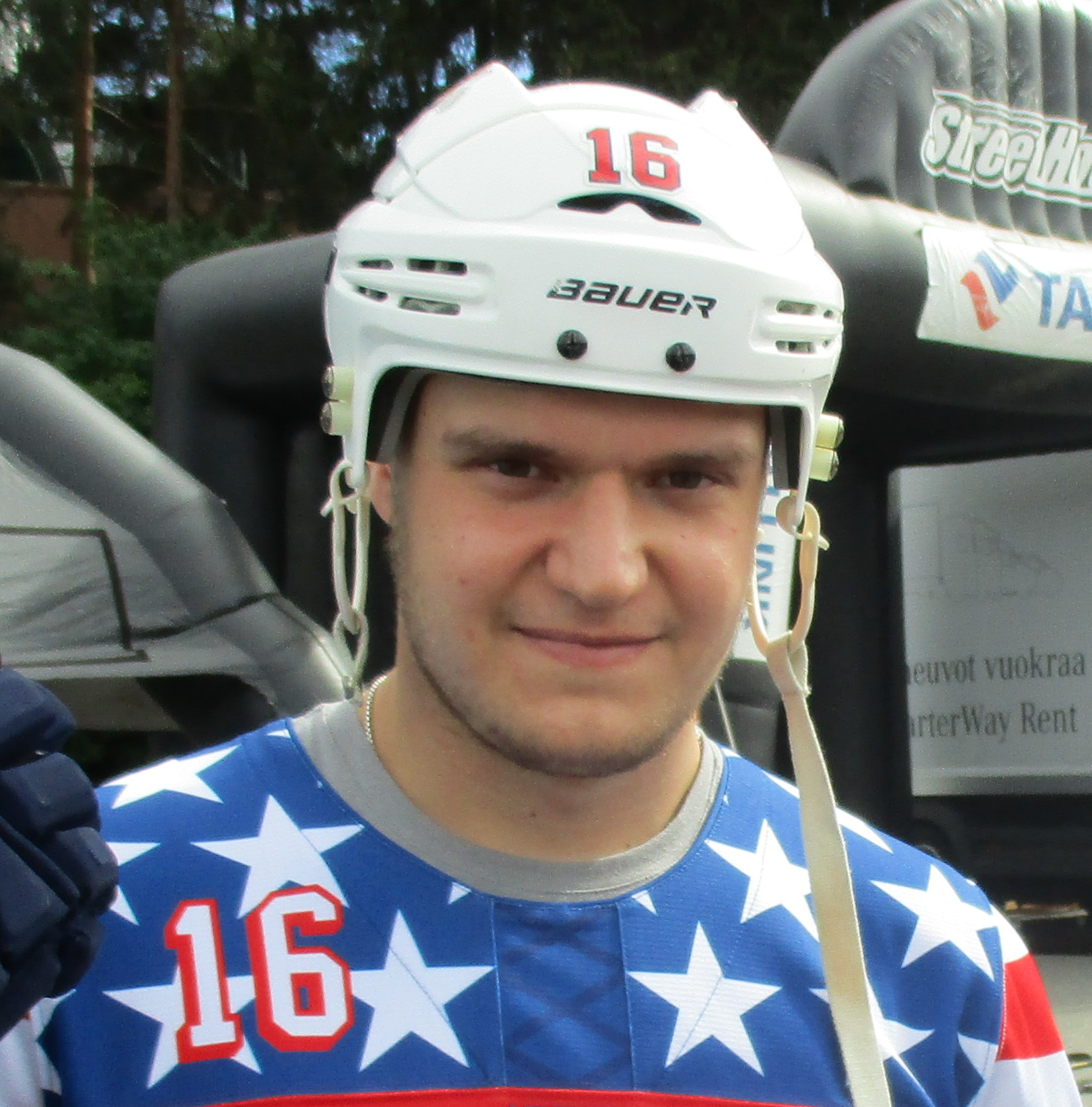
Aleksander Barkov captained the Panthers to their second consecutive and third overall Final appearance.

#	Nat	Player	Position	Hand	Age	Acquired	Place of birth	Final appearance
16	(Finland)	Aleksander Barkov – **C**	C	L	28	2013	Tampere, Finland	second (2023)
9	(Canada)	Sam Bennett	C	L	28	2021	East Gwillimbury, Ontario	second (2023)
72	(Russia)	Sergei Bobrovsky	G	L	35	2019	Novokuznetsk, Soviet Union	second (2023)
21	(Canada)	Nick Cousins	C	L	30	2022	Belleville, Ontario	second (2023)
5	(Canada)	Aaron Ekblad – **A**	D	R	28	2014	Windsor, Ontario	second (2023)
91	(Sweden)	Oliver Ekman-Larsson	D	L	32	2023	Karlskrona, Sweden	first
42	(Sweden)	Gustav Forsling	D	L	28	2021	Linköping, Sweden	second (2023)
12	(Canada)	Jonah Gadjovich	LW	L	27	2023	Whitby, Ontario	first (did not play)
7	(Russia)	Dmitry Kulikov	D	L	33	2023	Lipetsk, Soviet Union	first
94	(Canada)	Ryan Lomberg	LW	L	29	2020	Richmond Hill, Ontario	second (2023)
18	(Canada)	Steven Lorentz	C	L	28	2023	Kitchener, Ontario	first
15	(Finland)	Anton Lundell	C	L	22	2020	Espoo, Finland	second (2023)
27	(Finland)	Eetu Luostarinen	C	L	25	2020	Siilinjärvi, Finland	second (2023)
28	(Canada)	Josh Mahura	D	L	26	2022	St. Albert, Alberta	first (did not play)
77	(Finland)	Niko Mikkola	D	L	28	2023	Kiiminki, Finland	first
62	(Canada)	Brandon Montour	D	R	30	2021	Ohsweken, Ontario	second (2023)
8	(United States)	Kyle Okposo	RW	R	36	2024	Saint Paul, Minnesota	first
13	(Canada)	Sam Reinhart	C	R	28	2021	North Vancouver, British Columbia	second (2023)
17	(Canada)	Evan Rodrigues	C	R	30	2023	Etobicoke, Ontario	first
82	(Sweden)	Kevin Stenlund	C	R	27	2023	Stockholm, Sweden	first
41	(United States)	Anthony Stolarz	G	L	30	2023	Edison, New Jersey	first
10	(Russia)	Vladimir Tarasenko	RW	R	32	2024	Yaroslavl, Soviet Union	second (**2019**)
19	(United States)	Matthew Tkachuk – **A**	LW	L	26	2022	Scottsdale, Arizona	second (2023)
23	(Canada)	Carter Verhaeghe	C	L	28	2020	Waterdown, Ontario	third (**2020**, 2023)

== Stanley Cup engraving ==
The Stanley Cup was presented to Panthers captain Aleksander Barkov by NHL commissioner Gary Bettman following the Panthers' 2–1 win in game seven.

The following Panthers players and staff had their names engraved on the Stanley Cup:

2023–24 Florida Panthers

=== Players ===
Centres

- 9 Sam Bennett*
- 13 Sam Reinhart*
- 15 Anton Lundell
- 16 Aleksander Barkov (Captain)
- 17 Evan Rodrigues*
- 18 Steven Lorentz*
- 21 Nick Cousins*
- 23 Carter Verhaeghe*
- 27 Eetu Luostarinen*
- 82 Kevin Stenlund

Wingers

- 8 Kyle Okposo
- 10 Vladimir Tarasenko
- 12 Jonah Gadjovich †
- 19 Matthew Tkachuk (A)
- 94 Ryan Lomberg

Defencemen

- 5 Aaron Ekblad (A)
- 7 Dmitry Kulikov
- 28 Josh Mahura †
- 42 Gustav Forsling
- 62 Brandon Montour
- 77 Niko Mikkola
- 91 Oliver Ekman-Larsson

Goaltenders

- 41 Anthony Stolarz
- 72 Sergei Bobrovsky
- * Played both centre and wing.
- † Exemption granted to engrave the name of a player who did not automatically qualify. (Note: Automatic qualification for a player's name to be engraved on the Stanley Cup: Playing in (for a goaltender, dressing for) at least one Stanley Cup Final game or at least half of regular season games for the Stanley Cup winning team.)

=== Coaching and administrative staff ===
- Vincent Viola (owner/chairman/governor), Teresa Viola (alternate governor), John Viola (alternate governor), Michael Viola (alternate governor)
- Travis Viola (alternate governor), Doug Cifu (vice chairman/alternate governor), Bill Zito (president of hockey operations/general manager/alternate governor), Paul Maurice (head coach)
- John Congemi (assistant video coach), Myles Fee (assistant coach), Jamie Kompon (assistant coach), Sylvain Lefebvre (assistant coach)
- Teddy Richards (head equipment manager), Tuomo Ruutu (assistant coach), Robb Tallas (goaltending coach), Rick Dudley (senior advisor to the general manager)
- Paul Fenton (senior advisor to the general manager), Patric Hörnqvist (scouting and development consultant), Les Jackson (senior advisor to the general manager), Gregory Campbell (assistant general manager)
- Roberto Luongo (special advisor to the general manager), Paul Krepelka (senior vice president, hockey operations), Sunny Mehta (assistant general manager/head of analytics), Brett Peterson (assistant general manager)
- Dave DiNapoli (head athletic trainer), Chris McLellan (vice president of sports performance/strength and conditioning coach), Braden Birch (director of hockey operations and salary cap management), Bryan McCabe (director of player personnel)
- Matt Caldwell (president/CEO/alternate governor)

=== Engraving notes ===
- No. 12 Jonah Gadjovich (LW) played in 39 regular season games for Florida. He was a healthy scratch for the entire playoffs. No. 28 Josh Mahura (D) played in 30 regular season games for Florida. He missed the entire playoffs due to injury. As they did not automatically qualify, Florida successfully requested an exemption to engrave their names.
- Sam Reinhart was engraved as his full first name of Samson, while Nick Cousins was engraved as his full first name of Nicholas.
- Carter Verhaeghe became the first player to have his name engraved on the Stanley Cup with both teams from the state of Florida. His name is also on the Stanley Cup with Tampa Bay in 2020.
- Due to the high number of non-playing members, six training/equipment personnel had to be left off the Stanley Cup. They were included on the team picture and got Stanley Cup rings: Brian Riedel (assistant athletic trainer), Anthony Moore (assistant strength and conditioning coach), Thomas Anderson (assistant equipment manager), Dakota King (assistant equipment manager), Mike Valcy (massage therapist). Also left off were Shane Churla (director, amateur scouting) and Tim Wittenauer (director of sports performance and rehabilitation). When Florida the Stanley Cup for the second straight year in 2025, winning its second title; Riedel, Anderson, King, Valcy, Churla, and Wittenauer were included on the 2025 title engraving. Moore was not part of the 2025 team.
- Roberto Luongo's name engraved on the Stanley Cup for the first time. As a player, he was on the losing team in the Final in 2011. He was also on the losing team in the Final as an executive in 2023.
- Patric Hörnqvist had his name engraved on the Stanley Cup in 2016 and 2017 with Pittsburgh as a player. As a scouting and development consultant, his name was engraved with Florida in 2024.
- 53 total names were engraved on the Cup, rather than the standard 52. For unknown reasons, team president and CEO Matt Caldwell was engraved below the players, rather than with the executives and coaches.

=== Player notes ===
Eleven players on the roster during the Final were left off the Stanley Cup engraving due to not qualifying. None played in or dressed for any playoff games. They received championship rings.

Included in team picture

- No. 26 Uvis Balinskis (D) – 26 regular season games
- No. 2 Tobias Björnfot (D) – 1 regular season game with Florida, 2 with Vegas, and 1 with Los Angeles
- No. 30 Spencer Knight (G) – 0 regular season games, 45 with Charlotte of the AHL

Not in team picture

- No. 67 Will Lockwood (RW) – 26 regular season games
- No. 25 Mackie Samoskevich (RW) – 7 regular season games
- No. 24 Justin Sourdif (RW) – 3 regular season games
- No. 35 Magnus Hellberg (G) – 0 regular season games with Florida, 3 with Pittsburgh
- No. 44 Mike Benning (D) – 0 regular season games, 72 with Charlotte of the AHL
- No. 74 Rasmus Asplund (C) – 0 regular season games, 67 with Charlotte of the AHL
- No. 36 Patrick Giles (RW) – 0 regular season games, 66 with Charlotte of the AHL
- No. 3 Matt Kiersted (D) – 0 regular season games, 57 with Charlotte of the AHL

== Media rights ==
In Canada, this was the tenth consecutive Stanley Cup Final broadcast by Sportsnet and CBC Television in English, and TVA Sports in French. The series was also streamed on Sportsnet+, but was not available on CBC Gem like in previous years.

In the United States, the series was being televised on ABC and streamed on ESPN+. This was the third year of a seven-year deal in which ABC has the Final in even years and TNT has the series in odd years.

For the first time, the Final were broadcast with commentary and analysis in American Sign Language for the benefit of the Deaf community on both ESPN+ and Sportsnet+.

== Notes ==
Preceded by Vegas Golden Knights; 2023	Florida Panthers; Stanley Cup champions 2024	Succeeded by Florida Panthers; 2025
