= Kevin Stenlund =

Swedish ice hockey player (born 1996)

- Born: 20 September 1996 (age 29) Stockholm, Sweden
- Height: 6 ft 4 in (193 cm)
- Weight: 201 lb (91 kg; 14 st 5 lb)
- Position: Forward
- Shoots: Right
- NHL team Former teams: Utah Mammoth; HV71; Columbus Blue Jackets; Winnipeg Jets; Florida Panthers
- NHL draft: 58th overall, 2015; Columbus Blue Jackets
- Playing career: 2014–present

Kevin Stenlund (born 20 September 1996) is a Swedish professional ice hockey player who is a forward for the Utah Mammoth of the National Hockey League (NHL). Stenlund was drafted by the Columbus Blue Jackets, 58th overall, in the 2015 NHL entry draft. Stenlund won the Stanley Cup with the Florida Panthers in 2024.

== Playing career ==
Stenlund made his Swedish Hockey League debut playing with HV71 during the 2014–15 season. On 30 May 2015, Stenlund was signed to a two-year first team contract extension to remain with HV71.

=== Columbus Blue Jackets ===
On 23 May 2017, Stenlund signed his first NHL contract, agreeing to a three-year, entry-level deal with the Columbus Blue Jackets. In the 2017–18 season, he was returned on loan to continue his development in the SHL with HV71. Stenlund eclipsed his previous points totals in recording 15 assists and 22 points in 43 games before suffering an early exit with the club in the Wild Card round. Having completed the season with HV71, Stenlund was re-assigned to play out the remainder of the season with the Blue Jackets' AHL affiliate, the Cleveland Monsters, on 17 March 2018.

On 17 June 2021, Stenlund re-signed with the Blue Jackets on a one-year contract.

=== Winnipeg Jets ===
As a free agent after five seasons within the Blue Jackets organization, Stenlund was signed to a one-year, two-way contract with the Winnipeg Jets on 13 July 2022. In the 2022–23 season, Stenlund initially played with AHL affiliate, the Manitoba Moose, before he was recalled and solidified a fourth-line role within the Jets in posting 6 goals and 9 points through 54 regular season games.

=== Florida Panthers ===
Stenlund left the Jets after one season with the club, signing as a free agent to a one-year, $1 million contract with the Florida Panthers on 1 July 2023.

In the 2024 Stanley Cup playoffs, Stenlund appeared in 21 games, recording one assist. The Panthers defeated the Edmonton Oilers in game seven of the 2024 Stanley Cup Final on 24 June 2024, making Stenlund a Stanley Cup champion.

=== Utah Mammoth ===
As a free agent for a third straight year, Stenlund signed a two-year, $4 million contract with the Utah Mammoth on 1 July 2024.

== Career statistics ==
			Regular season					Playoffs
Season	Team	League	GP	G	A	Pts	PIM	GP	G	A	Pts	PIM
2013–14	HV71	J20	29	4	5	9	16	7	1	1	2	0
2014–15	HV71	J20	36	14	22	36	16	6	1	3	4	4
2014–15	HV71	SHL	17	1	0	1	2	—	—	—	—	—
2015–16	HV71	J20	17	5	19	24	31	—	—	—	—	—
2015–16	HV71	SHL	43	1	1	2	20	6	1	0	1	2
2015–16	HC Vita Hästen	Allsv	1	0	0	0	0	—	—	—	—	—
2016–17	HV71	J20	3	2	1	3	12	—	—	—	—	—
2016–17	HV71	SHL	48	13	7	20	16	16	4	6	10	6
2016–17	Västerviks IK	Allsv	2	1	3	4	2	—	—	—	—	—
2017–18	HV71	SHL	43	7	15	22	28	2	0	1	1	2
2017–18	Cleveland Monsters	AHL	7	0	2	2	4	—	—	—	—	—
2018–19	Cleveland Monsters	AHL	59	15	10	25	12	5	1	0	1	0
2018–19	Columbus Blue Jackets	NHL	4	0	0	0	4	—	—	—	—	—
2019–20	Cleveland Monsters	AHL	33	6	12	18	24	—	—	—	—	—
2019–20	Columbus Blue Jackets	NHL	32	6	4	10	8	2	1	0	1	0
2020–21	Columbus Blue Jackets	NHL	32	5	5	10	8	—	—	—	—	—
2021–22	Cleveland Monsters	AHL	42	8	17	25	20	—	—	—	—	—
2021–22	Columbus Blue Jackets	NHL	3	0	0	0	2	—	—	—	—	—
2022–23	Manitoba Moose	AHL	19	4	10	14	26	—	—	—	—	—
2022–23	Winnipeg Jets	NHL	54	6	3	9	20	5	1	0	1	2
2023–24	Florida Panthers	NHL	81	11	4	15	62	24	0	1	1	8
2024–25	Utah Hockey Club	NHL	82	14	14	28	40	—	—	—	—	—
2025–26	Utah Mammoth	NHL	80	4	14	18	24	6	1	0	1	2
SHL totals			151	22	23	45	66	24	5	7	12	10
NHL totals			368	46	44	90	168	37	3	1	4	12

== Awards and honors ==
Award	Year	Ref
SHL
Le Mat Trophy champion	2017	
NHL
Stanley Cup champion	2024	
