= Niko Mikkola =

Finnish ice hockey player (born 1996)

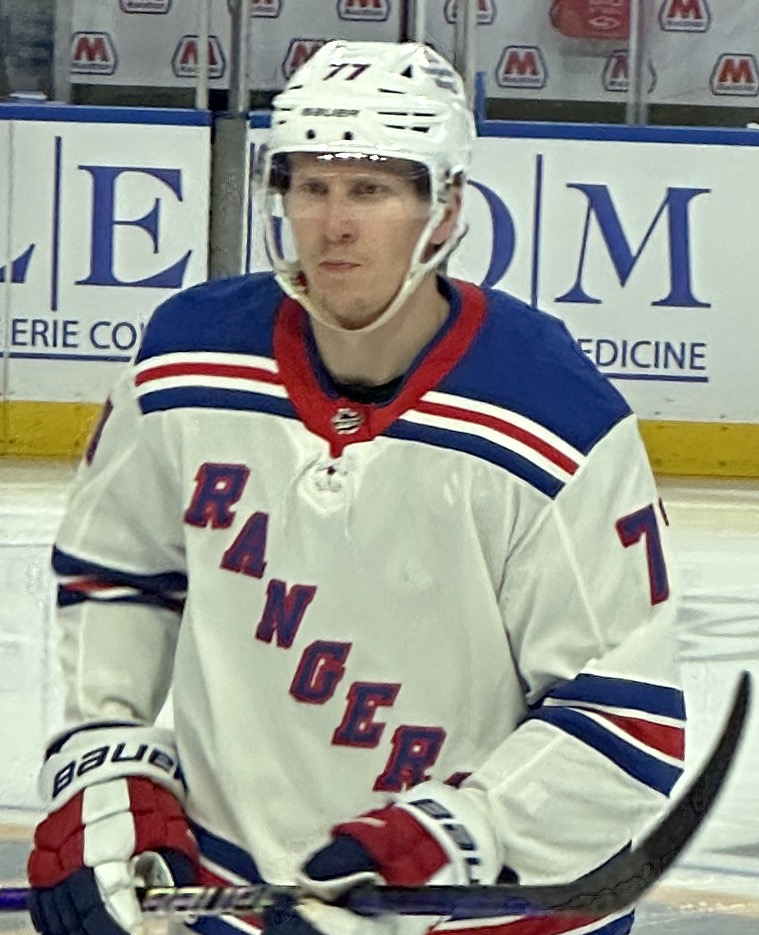
- Mikkola with the New York Rangers in 2023
- Born: 27 April 1996 (age 30) Kiiminki, Finland
- Height: 6 ft 5 in (196 cm)
- Weight: 198 lb (90 kg; 14 st 2 lb)
- Position: Defence
- Shoots: Left
- NHL team Former teams: Florida Panthers; KalPa; Tappara; St. Louis Blues; New York Rangers
- National team: Finland
- NHL draft: 127th overall, 2015; St. Louis Blues
- Playing career: 2014–present

Niko Mikkola (born 27 April 1996) is a Finnish professional ice hockey player who is a defenceman for the Florida Panthers of the National Hockey League (NHL). Mikkola was selected by the St. Louis Blues, 127th overall, in the 2015 NHL entry draft. He previously played for the St. Louis Blues and the New York Rangers. Mikkola won back-to-back Stanley Cups with the Panthers in 2024 and 2025.

== Playing career ==
Mikkola made his Liiga debut playing with KalPa during the 2014–15 Liiga season.

On 29 May 2017, despite interest from the St. Louis Blues to sign his entry-level deal, Mikkola opted to continue his professional career in the Liiga, signing a two-year deal with fellow Finnish outfit, Tappara. By still harbouring NHL ambitions, Mikkola opted to attend the St. Louis Blues 2017 training camp in preparation for the 2017–18 season. He was assigned back to Tappara after competing in two pre-season contests with the Blues on 25 September 2017. In his only season with Tappara, Mikkola added 2 goals and 11 points in 50 regular season games before helping the club to a silver medal in the postseason, leading the league in plus-minus.

On 1 June 2018, Mikkola agreed to a two-year, entry-level contract with the St. Louis Blues.

During the 2019–20 season, on 7 January 2020, Mikkola made his NHL debut with the Blues against the San Jose Sharks.

On 8 March 2021, Mikkola scored his first NHL goal, against San Jose Sharks goaltender Devan Dubnyk.

Following his second full season with the Blues in 2021–22, Mikkola as a restricted free agent was signed to a one-year, $1.9 million contract extension on 17 July 2022.

During the 2022–23 season, Mikkola registered three assists through 50 regular season games before he was traded by the Blues on 9 February 2023, alongside Vladimir Tarasenko, to the New York Rangers in exchange for a conditional first-round selection in 2023 NHL entry draft and fourth-round selection in 2024, Samuel Blais and Hunter Skinner.

As a free agent from the Rangers, Mikkola signed a three-year, $7.5 million contract with the Florida Panthers on 1 July 2023.

On 24 June 2024, Mikkola won the Stanley Cup with the Florida Panthers, after edging out the Edmonton Oilers 2–1 in game 7 of the 2024 Stanley Cup Final.

On 2 October 2025, Mikkola signed an eight-year contract extension with the Panthers beginning with 2026–27 NHL season.

== International play ==
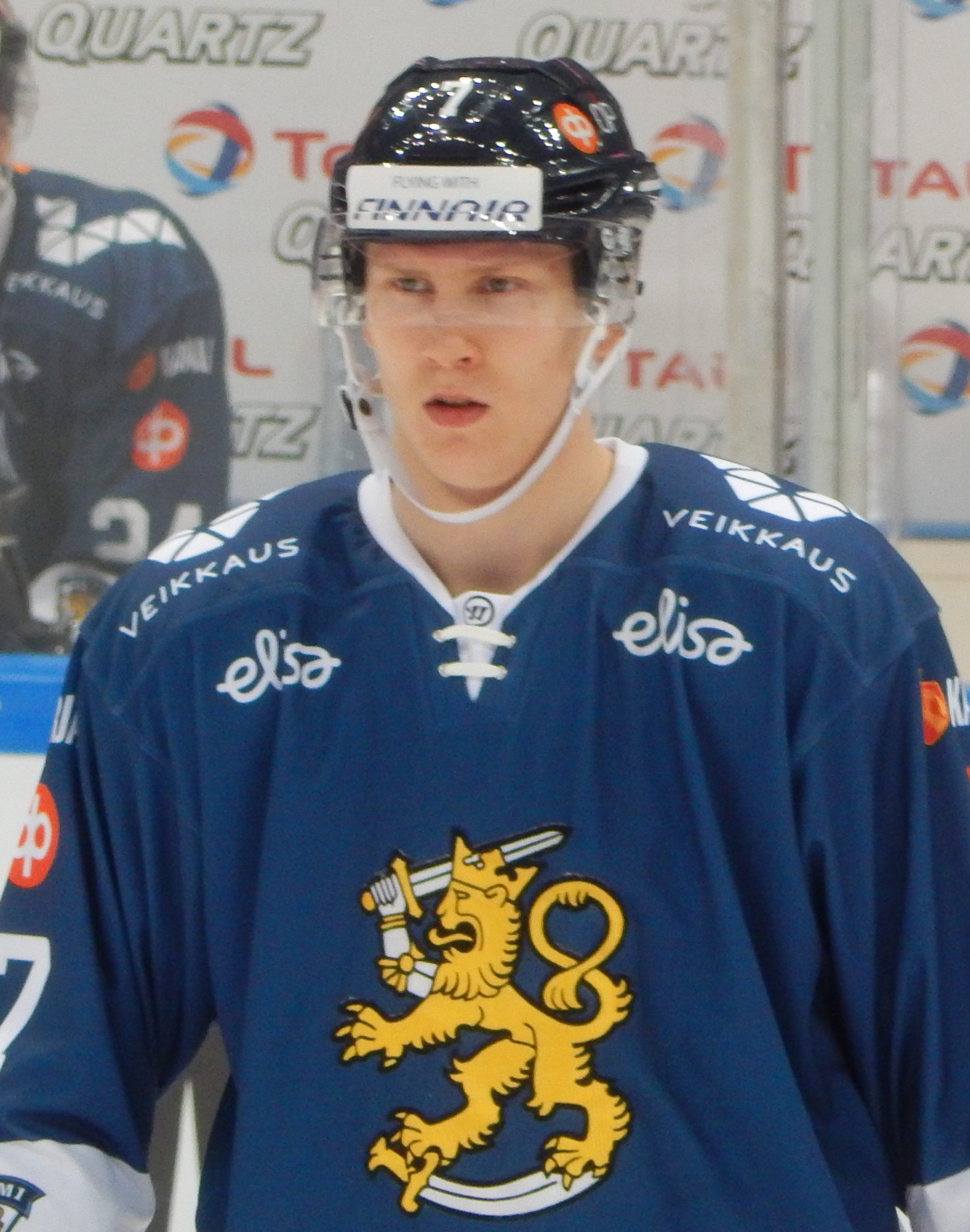

Medal record

Men's ice hockey

Representing Finland

Olympic Games
Bronze medal – third place	2026 Milano Cortina	

World Championships
Gold medal – first place	2019 Slovakia	

World Junior Championships
Gold medal – first place	2016 Finland	

Mikkola represented the Finland junior team at the 2016 World Junior Ice Hockey Championships.

He represented the Finland national team at the 2019 IIHF World Championship and the 4 Nations Face-Off.

He represented Finland at the 2026 Winter Olympics and won a bronze medal.

== Career statistics ==
			Regular season					Playoffs
Season	Team	League	GP	G	A	Pts	PIM	GP	G	A	Pts	PIM
2014–15	KalPa	Jr. A	37	9	14	23	80	—	—	—	—	—
2014–15	KalPa	Liiga	10	0	1	1	4	—	—	—	—	—
2014–15	Hokki	Mestis	5	1	0	1	8	7	0	1	1	2
2015–16	KalPa	Liiga	55	3	6	9	22	3	0	1	1	4
2015–16	KalPa	Jr. A	—	—	—	—	—	8	0	1	1	10
2016–17	KalPa	Liiga	56	4	11	15	89	10	1	2	3	4
2017–18	Tappara	Liiga	50	2	9	11	54	16	0	1	1	10
2018–19	San Antonio Rampage	AHL	70	2	7	9	41	—	—	—	—	—
2019–20	San Antonio Rampage	AHL	48	2	12	14	24	—	—	—	—	—
2019–20	St. Louis Blues	NHL	5	0	1	1	0	—	—	—	—	—
2020–21	St. Louis Blues	NHL	30	1	2	3	11	4	0	1	1	2
2021–22	St. Louis Blues	NHL	54	3	10	13	55	12	0	1	1	8
2022–23	St. Louis Blues	NHL	50	0	3	3	35	—	—	—	—	—
2022–23	New York Rangers	NHL	31	1	2	3	23	7	0	2	2	12
2023–24	Florida Panthers	NHL	82	3	14	17	69	24	2	2	4	22
2024–25	Florida Panthers	NHL	76	6	16	22	70	22	3	3	6	37
2025–26	Florida Panthers	NHL	68	3	8	11	47	—	—	—	—	—
Liiga totals			171	9	27	36	169	29	1	4	5	18
NHL totals			396	17	56	73	310	69	5	9	14	81

=== International ===
Year	Team	Event	Result	GP	G	A	Pts	PIM
2016	Finland	WJC	1st place, gold medalist(s)	7	0	1	1	6
2019	Finland	WC	1st place, gold medalist(s)	10	2	3	5	0
2025	Finland	4NF	4th	3	0	1	1	2
2026	Finland	OG	3rd place, bronze medalist(s)	6	0	3	3	4
Junior totals				7	0	1	1	6
Senior totals				19	2	7	9	6

== Awards and honours ==
Award	Year	Ref
NHL
Stanley Cup champion	2024, 2025	
