= Ryan Lomberg =

Canadian ice hockey player (born 1994)

- Lomberg with the Calgary Flames in 2026
- Born: December 9, 1994 (age 31) Richmond Hill, Ontario, Canada
- Height: 5 ft 9 in (175 cm)
- Weight: 199 lb (90 kg; 14 st 3 lb)
- Position: Left wing
- Shoots: Left
- NHL team Former teams: Columbus Blue Jackets; Calgary Flames; Florida Panthers
- NHL draft: Undrafted
- Playing career: 2015–present

Ryan Lomberg (born December 9, 1994) is a Canadian professional ice hockey player who is a left winger for the Columbus Blue Jackets of the National Hockey League (NHL). Lomberg won the Stanley Cup with the Florida Panthers in 2024.

== Playing career ==
=== Junior ===
A native of Richmond Hill, Ontario, Lomberg began his junior hockey career in the Ontario Junior Hockey League (OJHL), playing bit roles in parts of two seasons with the North York Rangers and the Upper Canada Patriots in 2009–10 and 2010–11. From there, he moved on to play for the Muskegon Lumberjacks of the United States Hockey League (USHL) in the 2011–12 season, emerging as the team's offensive leader with 40 points in 52 games, while adding 154 penalty minutes – enough for fifth in the league.

Attending the University of Maine beginning with the 2012–13 school year, Lomberg played for the Maine Black Bears for two seasons, accumulating 18 goals and 14 assists over 66 games with the team. However, following the 2013–14 season, Lomberg left the school after being suspended from the Black Bears due to an assault and disorderly conduct charge, the latter of which he pleaded guilty to.

Looking to get his hockey career back on track, Lomberg returned to the USHL for the 2014–15 season with the Youngstown Phantoms. Lomberg scored 24 goals and 43 points in the regular season while playing with future Winnipeg Jets forward Kyle Connor and serving as team captain to help lead the Phantoms to the Anderson Cup.

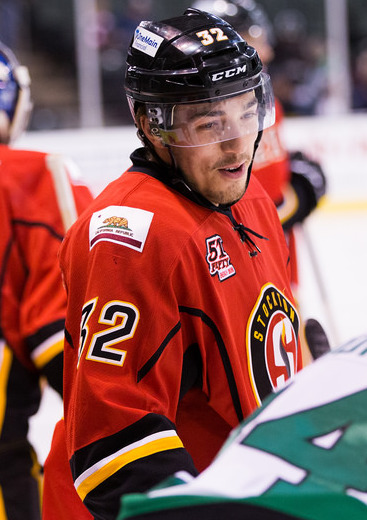
Lomberg with the Stockton Heat in 2015

Lomberg's play with the Phantoms caught the eye of the Calgary Flames' amateur scouting staff, earning him an invite to their annual fall development camp. Lomberg impressed enough to earn a minor-league deal with the Stockton Heat, Calgary's AHL affiliate. The deal was announced in the wake of speculation that Lomberg would join Miami University's men's hockey team on a transfer from the University of Maine.

=== Professional ===
Lomberg split his first professional season between the Heat and their ECHL affiliate, the Adirondack Thunder. Scoring at nearly a point-per-game pace with the Flames, Lomberg earned extended time with the Heat throughout the system, going goalless with 3 assists and 42 penalty minutes in 15 AHL games during the 2015–16 AHL season.

Continuing with the Heat in 2016–17, Lomberg emerged as a more multi-dimensional player. In addition to his 127 penalty minutes, Lomberg scored 13 goals and 29 points in 68 games with the team, good for seventh and eighth on the team, respectively.

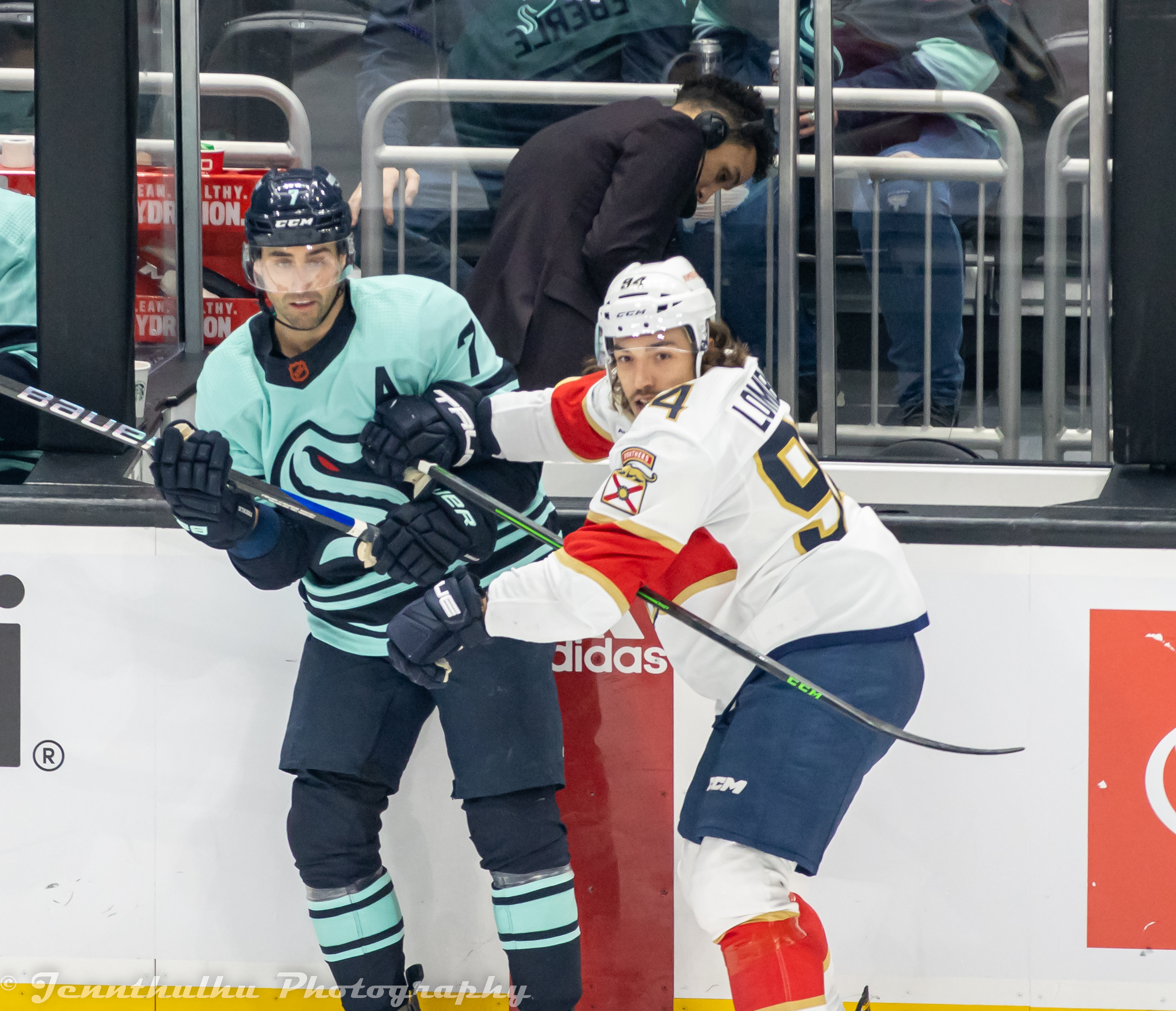
Lomberg (right) during a game against the Seattle Kraken in 2022.

Impressed with his work ethic and determination, the Calgary Flames rewarded Lomberg with a two-year entry-level contract worth $710,000 per season in the NHL on March 17, 2017. The deal came into effect at the beginning of the 2017–18 NHL season.

Looking to inject some energy into the lineup and forced to deal with the absence of Jaromír Jágr, the Flames recalled Lomberg on January 14, 2018. He made his NHL debut eleven days later, on January 25, against the Edmonton Oilers. During the game, he fought the Oilers' Zack Kassian, and recorded 6:30 of total playing time.

After five seasons within the Flames organization, Lomberg left as a free agent to sign a two-year, $1.45 million contract with the Florida Panthers on October 9, 2020. He played 34 games for the Panthers during the 2020–21 season, recording two goals and two assists in 34 games. On November 26, 2021, the Panthers re-signed Lomberg to a two-year contract extension.

After helping the Panthers claim their first Stanley Cup in franchise history, Lomberg left as a free agent and was signed to a two-year, $4 million contract in a return with his original club, the Calgary Flames, on July 1, 2024.

Lomberg signed a two-year, $2.6 million contract with the Columbus Blue Jackets on July 1, 2026.

== Career statistics ==
			Regular season					Playoffs
Season	Team	League	GP	G	A	Pts	PIM	GP	G	A	Pts	PIM
2009–10	North York Rangers	OJHL	4	0	0	0	0	—	—	—	—	—
2010–11	Upper Canada Patriots	OJHL	1	0	0	0	0	4	0	0	0	0
2011–12	Muskegon Lumberjacks	USHL	52	22	18	40	154	—	—	—	—	—
2012–13	University of Maine	HE	32	7	7	14	42	—	—	—	—	—
2013–14	University of Maine	HE	34	11	7	18	40	—	—	—	—	—
2014–15	Youngstown Phantoms	USHL	56	24	19	43	146	4	1	1	2	6
2015–16	Adirondack Thunder	ECHL	43	18	17	35	48	12	3	3	6	27
2015–16	Stockton Heat	AHL	15	0	3	3	42	—	—	—	—	—
2016–17	Stockton Heat	AHL	68	13	16	29	127	1	0	0	0	0
2017–18	Stockton Heat	AHL	57	13	15	28	110	—	—	—	—	—
2017–18	Calgary Flames	NHL	7	0	1	1	15	—	—	—	—	—
2018–19	Stockton Heat	AHL	58	12	17	29	72	—	—	—	—	—
2018–19	Calgary Flames	NHL	4	0	0	0	17	—	—	—	—	—
2019–20	Stockton Heat	AHL	21	11	9	20	14	—	—	—	—	—
2020–21	Florida Panthers	NHL	34	2	2	4	67	6	1	0	1	30
2021–22	Florida Panthers	NHL	55	9	9	18	92	5	1	0	1	2
2022–23	Florida Panthers	NHL	82	12	8	20	88	13	1	0	1	22
2023–24	Florida Panthers	NHL	75	5	2	7	80	8	0	0	0	10
2024–25	Calgary Flames	NHL	80	3	10	13	57	—	—	—	—	—
2025–26	Calgary Flames	NHL	57	4	5	9	59	—	—	—	—	—
NHL totals			394	35	37	72	475	32	3	0	3	64

== Awards and honours ==
Award	Year	Ref
NHL
Stanley Cup Champion	2024	
