= Kyle Okposo =

American ice hockey player (born 1988)

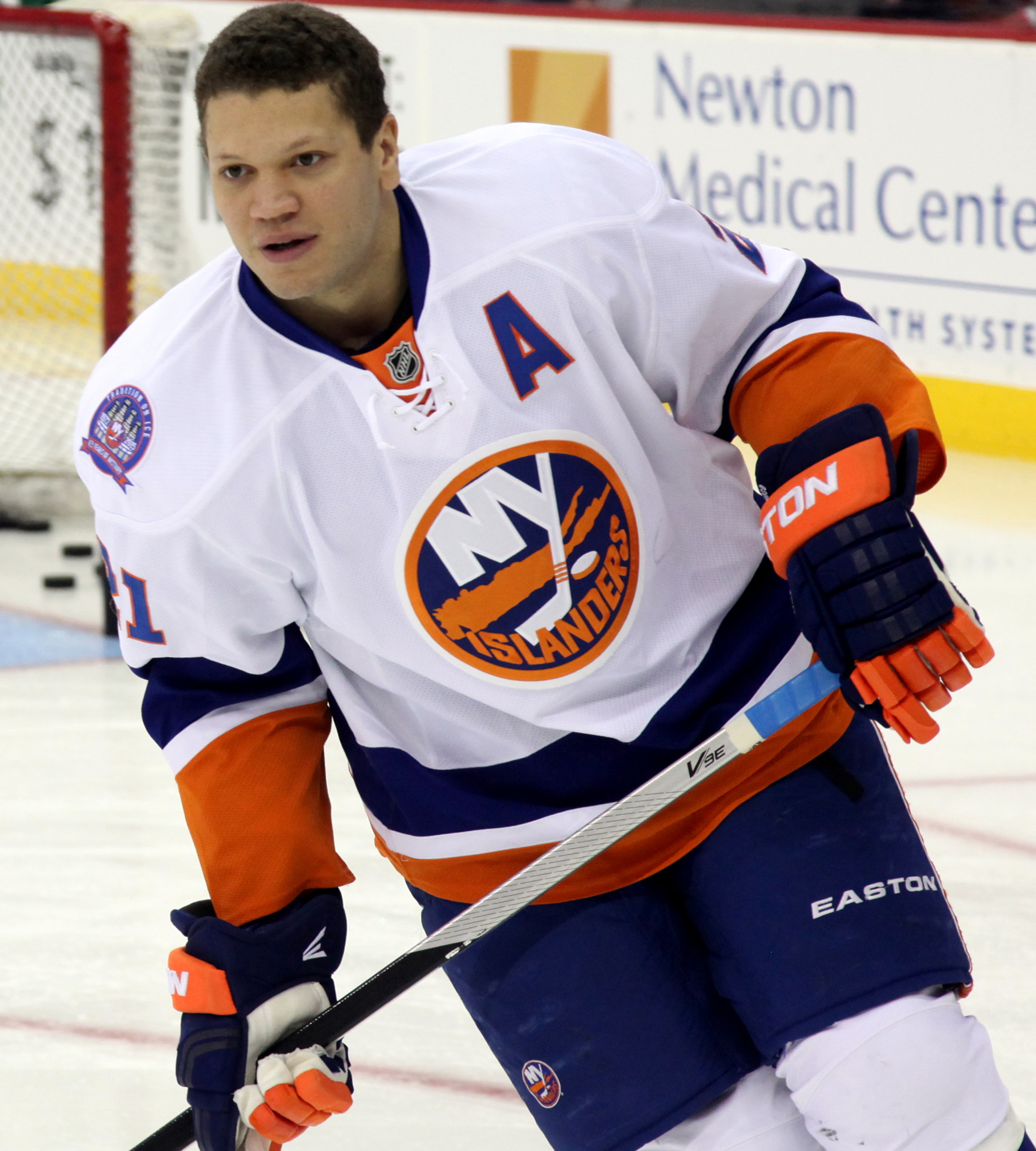
- Okposo with the New York Islanders in January 2015
- Born: April 16, 1988 (age 38) Saint Paul, Minnesota, U.S.
- Height: 6 ft 0 in (183 cm)
- Weight: 216 lb (98 kg; 15 st 6 lb)
- Position: Right wing
- Shot: Right
- Played for: New York Islanders; Buffalo Sabres; Florida Panthers
- National team: United States
- NHL draft: 7th overall, 2006; New York Islanders
- Playing career: 2007–2024

Kyle Henry Erovre Okposo (born April 16, 1988) is an American former professional ice hockey right winger who played 17 seasons in the National Hockey League (NHL) for the New York Islanders, Buffalo Sabres, and Florida Panthers. He was drafted seventh overall by the Islanders in the 2006 NHL entry draft. Okposo won the Stanley Cup with the Panthers in 2024.

== Playing career ==
=== Junior and college ===
Okposo played one season in the United States Hockey League (USHL) with the Des Moines Buccaneers, in which he was named the most valuable player of the USHL playoffs and the league's top rookie. He helped the Buccaneers to a Clark Cup victory.

During his freshman season at University of Minnesota, Okposo was placed at the center position, even though he is a natural winger. Throughout most of the season this became his most common position due to the abundance of wingers on the team.

On June 7, 2007, Okposo announced he would be returning to the University of Minnesota for the 2007–08 season. Okposo played for Minnesota until December 19, 2007, when he decided to sign a three-year, entry-level contract with the Islanders.

Okposo's decision to leave school was considered controversial by some. As a response to questioning, Islanders general manager Garth Snow told the Minneapolis Star-Tribune, "Quite frankly, we weren't happy with the program. They have a responsibility to coach, to make Kyle a better player, and they were not doing that."

Coach Don Lucia then claimed that the Islanders put him "in a very difficult position." In his response to Snow's comments, Lucia emphasized the importance of obtaining a degree, "We have had numerous players sign and play in the NHL, but just as important many more move on to have successful careers after graduating from the University of Minnesota. We have always and will continue to work to ensure our players reach their potential on the ice and in the classroom."

=== New York Islanders ===
Okposo signed an entry-level contract with the Islanders and was assigned to their top minor league affiliate, the AHL's Bridgeport Sound Tigers. He made his NHL debut on March 18, 2008, against the Toronto Maple Leafs, and netted his first career NHL goal on March 21, 2008, against the New Jersey Devils, a game-winner scored on the powerplay against Martin Brodeur. He also scored in his final game of the season in a game against the New York Rangers.

On September 17, 2009, Okposo suffered a mild concussion after a check to the head by Dion Phaneuf. He returned to the Islanders' lineup for their opening game on October 3, 2009. On May 25, 2011, he signed a five-year, $14 million contract with the New York Islanders.

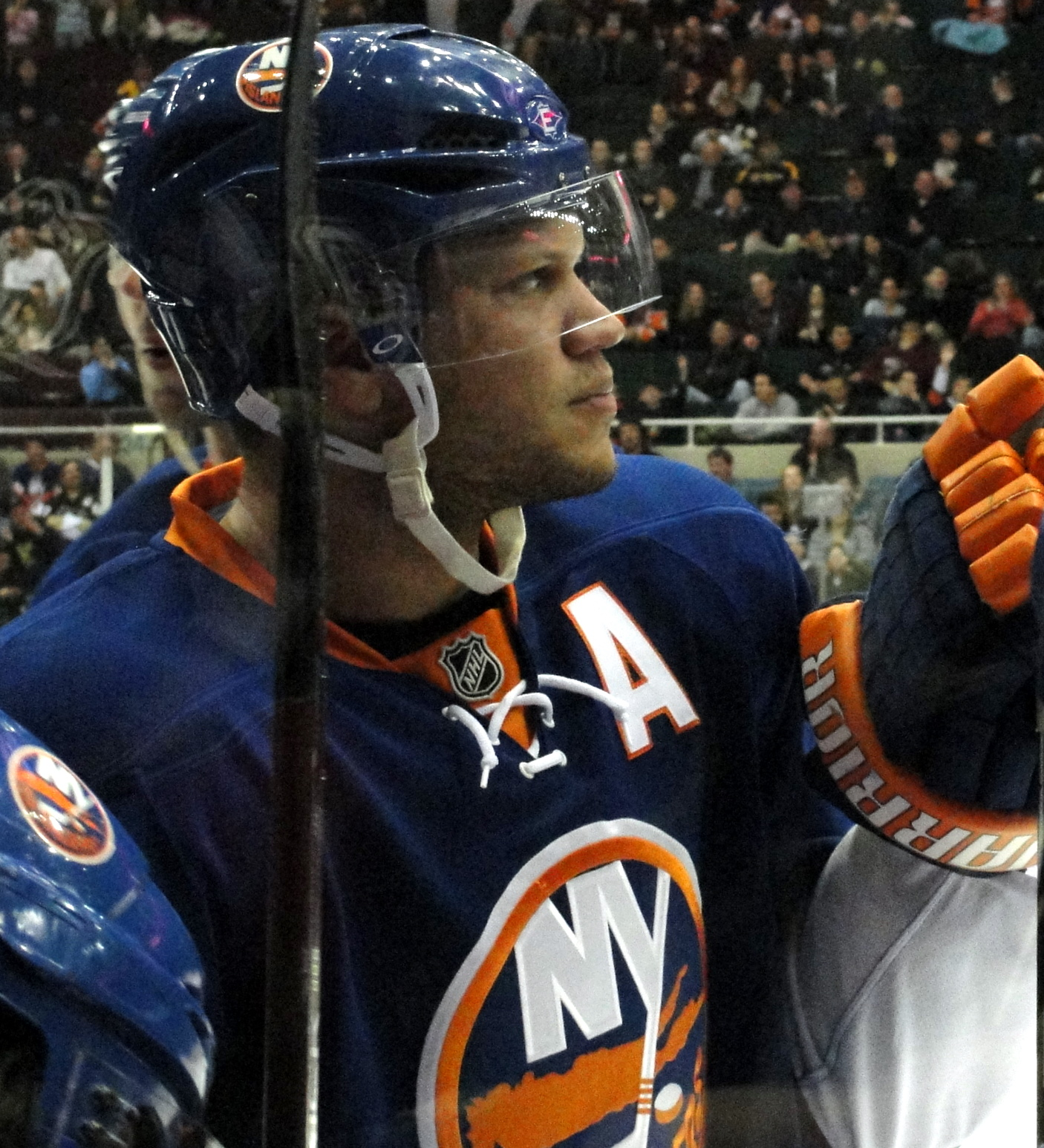
Okposo with the Islanders in February 2011

Okposo broke out in the 2013–14 season, shortly after a strong 2013 playoffs against the Pittsburgh Penguins. Playing on a line mostly with John Tavares and Thomas Vanek, Okposo scored 69 points in 71 games, leading the Islanders in points for the first and only time since he and Tavares were on the team together (Mathew Barzal also led the Islanders in scoring with Tavares on the roster, but not Okposo). He scored his 100th career goal on October 14, 2014, against the New York Rangers. On January 16, 2015, Okposo scored four goals against the Penguins, also being his first NHL hat trick.

=== Buffalo Sabres ===
On July 1, 2016, Okposo signed a seven-year, $42 million contract with the Buffalo Sabres.

During his first season with the club, Okposo recorded 45 points in 65 games. He also represented the team at the 2017 National Hockey League All-Star Game. He missed time at the end of the season after suffering a concussion and having a reaction to the medication.

Okposo's output declined in each of the next four seasons and fans eventually began to call for him to be bought out of his contract. However, he posted a strong bounce back in the 2021–22 season, recording 21 goals and 24 assists for 45 points, his highest total since his first season with the Sabres.

After spending the previous season as an alternate, Okposo was named the 20th captain in Sabres history ahead of the 2022–23 season.

Having completed his seven-year contract with the Sabres, Okposo continued his tenure as team captain in signing a one-year, $2.5 million contract extension with Buffalo on May 24, 2023. Okposo then played his 1,000th NHL game on November 14, 2023, in a 5–2 loss to the Boston Bruins.

=== Florida Panthers and retirement ===
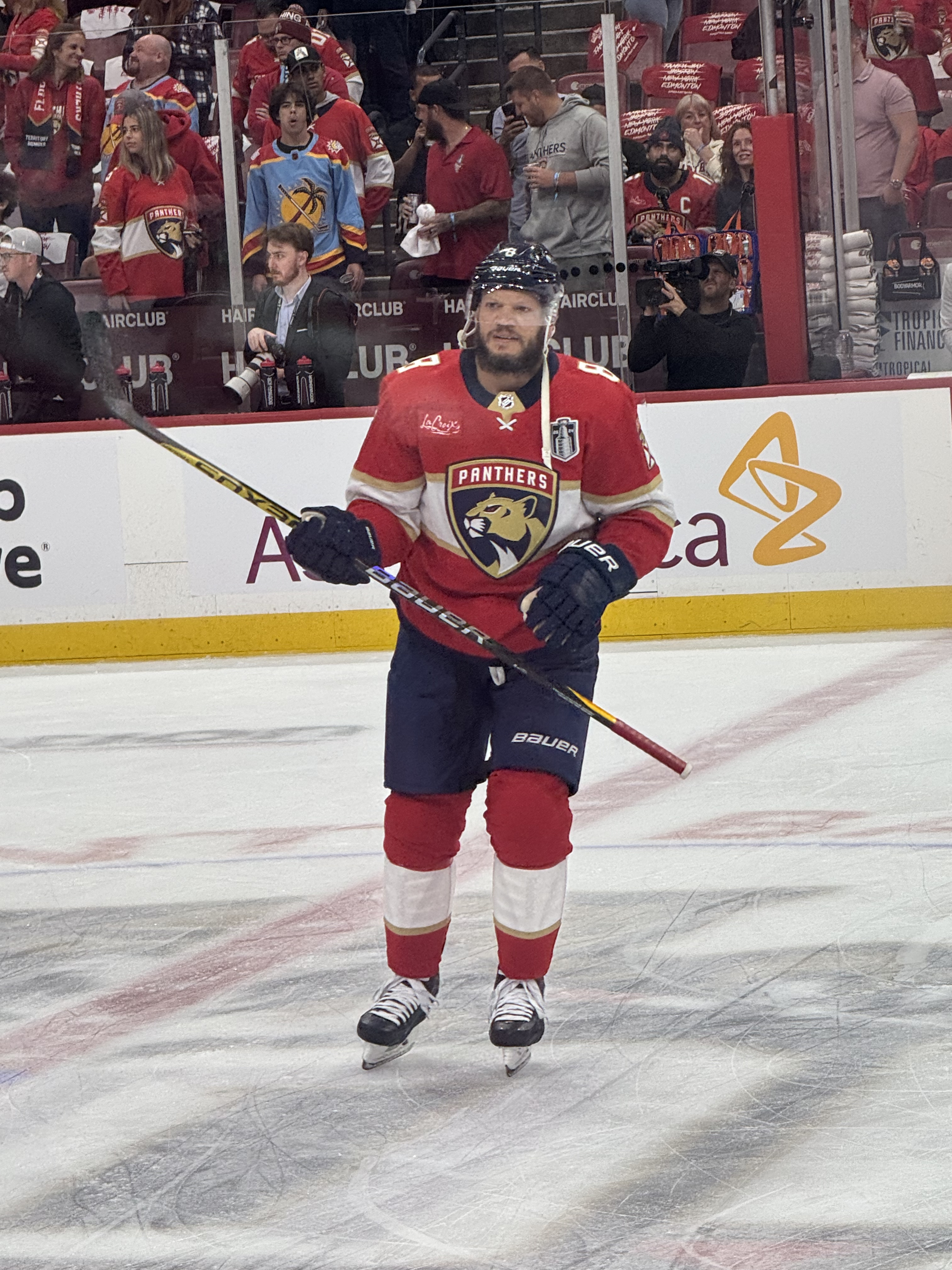
Okposo with the Panthers during the 2024 Stanley Cup Final

On March 8, 2024, Okposo was traded to the Florida Panthers in exchange for Calle Själin and a conditional 2024 seventh-round pick. Okposo would help his new team reach the Stanley Cup Final for their second straight appearance, eventuating in a game seven win over the Edmonton Oilers and securing Okposo his first career Stanley Cup Championship after 17 years in the NHL. He was the third player to hoist the cup, following Panthers captain Aleksander Barkov and Sergei Bobrovsky.

Following his first championship, Okposo announced his retirement on September 19, 2024.

== Personal life ==
Okposo's Nigerian father, Kome Okposo, and American mother, Michelle Okposo, are both pharmacists.

Okposo and his wife have four children.

Okposo has been open about having experienced mental health struggles during his hockey career. In 2017, Okposo experienced a mood change and was prescribed medicines which had the negative side-effect of appetite loss which resulted in Okposo's weight dropping from 211 pounds to 199 pounds. In late March 2017, Okposo was hospitalized in the neurosurgical intensive care unit in Buffalo General Hospital and missed the remainder of the season.

== International play ==
In January 2007, he played for the United States national junior team in the 2007 IIHF World Junior Championship.

== Career statistics ==
=== Regular season and playoffs ===
			Regular season					Playoffs
Season	Team	League	GP	G	A	Pts	PIM	GP	G	A	Pts	PIM
2003–04	Shattuck–Saint Mary's	HSMN	71	46	53	99	46	—	—	—	—	—
2004–05	Shattuck–Saint Mary's	HSMN	65	47	45	92	72	—	—	—	—	—
2005–06	Des Moines Buccaneers	USHL	50	27	31	58	56	11	5	11	16	8
2006–07	University of Minnesota	WCHA	33	17	20	37	30	7	2	1	3	4
2007–08	University of Minnesota	WCHA	18	7	4	11	6	—	—	—	—	—
2007–08	Bridgeport Sound Tigers	AHL	35	9	19	28	12	—	—	—	—	—
2007–08	New York Islanders	NHL	9	2	3	5	2	—	—	—	—	—
2008–09	New York Islanders	NHL	65	18	21	39	36	—	—	—	—	—
2008–09	Bridgeport Sound Tigers	AHL	—	—	—	—	—	2	1	0	1	2
2009–10	New York Islanders	NHL	80	19	33	52	34	—	—	—	—	—
2010–11	New York Islanders	NHL	38	5	15	20	40	—	—	—	—	—
2011–12	New York Islanders	NHL	79	24	21	45	46	—	—	—	—	—
2012–13	New York Islanders	NHL	48	4	20	24	38	6	3	1	4	5
2013–14	New York Islanders	NHL	71	27	42	69	51	—	—	—	—	—
2014–15	New York Islanders	NHL	60	18	33	51	12	7	2	1	3	2
2015–16	New York Islanders	NHL	79	22	42	64	51	10	2	6	8	4
2016–17	Buffalo Sabres	NHL	65	19	26	45	24	—	—	—	—	—
2017–18	Buffalo Sabres	NHL	76	15	29	44	40	—	—	—	—	—
2018–19	Buffalo Sabres	NHL	78	14	15	29	41	—	—	—	—	—
2019–20	Buffalo Sabres	NHL	52	9	10	19	28	—	—	—	—	—
2020–21	Buffalo Sabres	NHL	35	2	11	13	0	—	—	—	—	—
2021–22	Buffalo Sabres	NHL	74	21	24	45	43	—	—	—	—	—
2022–23	Buffalo Sabres	NHL	75	11	17	28	34	—	—	—	—	—
2023–24	Buffalo Sabres	NHL	61	12	10	22	32	—	—	—	—	—
2023–24	Florida Panthers	NHL	6	0	0	0	2	17	0	2	2	10
NHL totals			1,051	242	372	614	554	41	7	10	17	21

=== International ===
Medal record

Representing United States

Ice hockey

World Junior Championships
Bronze medal – third place	2007 Mora	

Year	Team	Event	Result	GP	G	A	Pts	PIM
2005	United States	U17	5th	5	2	2	4	2
2005	United States	U18	5th	5	4	3	7	10
2007	United States	WJC	3rd place, bronze medalist(s)	7	0	1	1	2
2008	United States	WJC	4th	6	1	5	6	2
2009	United States	WC	4th	9	2	3	5	10
2010	United States	WC	13th	6	1	2	3	0
2012	United States	WC	7th	8	2	1	3	0
Junior totals				23	7	11	18	16
Senior totals				23	5	6	11	10

== Awards and honors ==
Award	Year	Ref
USHL
Rookie of the Year	2006	
Clark Cup playoffs MVP	2006	
First All-Star Team	2006	
All-Rookie Team	2006	
College
All-WCHA Rookie Team	2007	
All-WCHA Second Team	2007	
NHL
NHL All-Star Game	2017	
Stanley Cup champion	2024	
Bob Nystrom Award	2010	

Awards and achievements
Preceded by Ryan O'Marra	New York Islanders first round pick 2006	Succeeded by Josh Bailey
Sporting positions
Preceded by Jack Eichel	Buffalo Sabres captain 2022–2024	Succeeded by Rasmus Dahlin
