= Warren Foegele =

Canadian ice hockey player (born 1996)

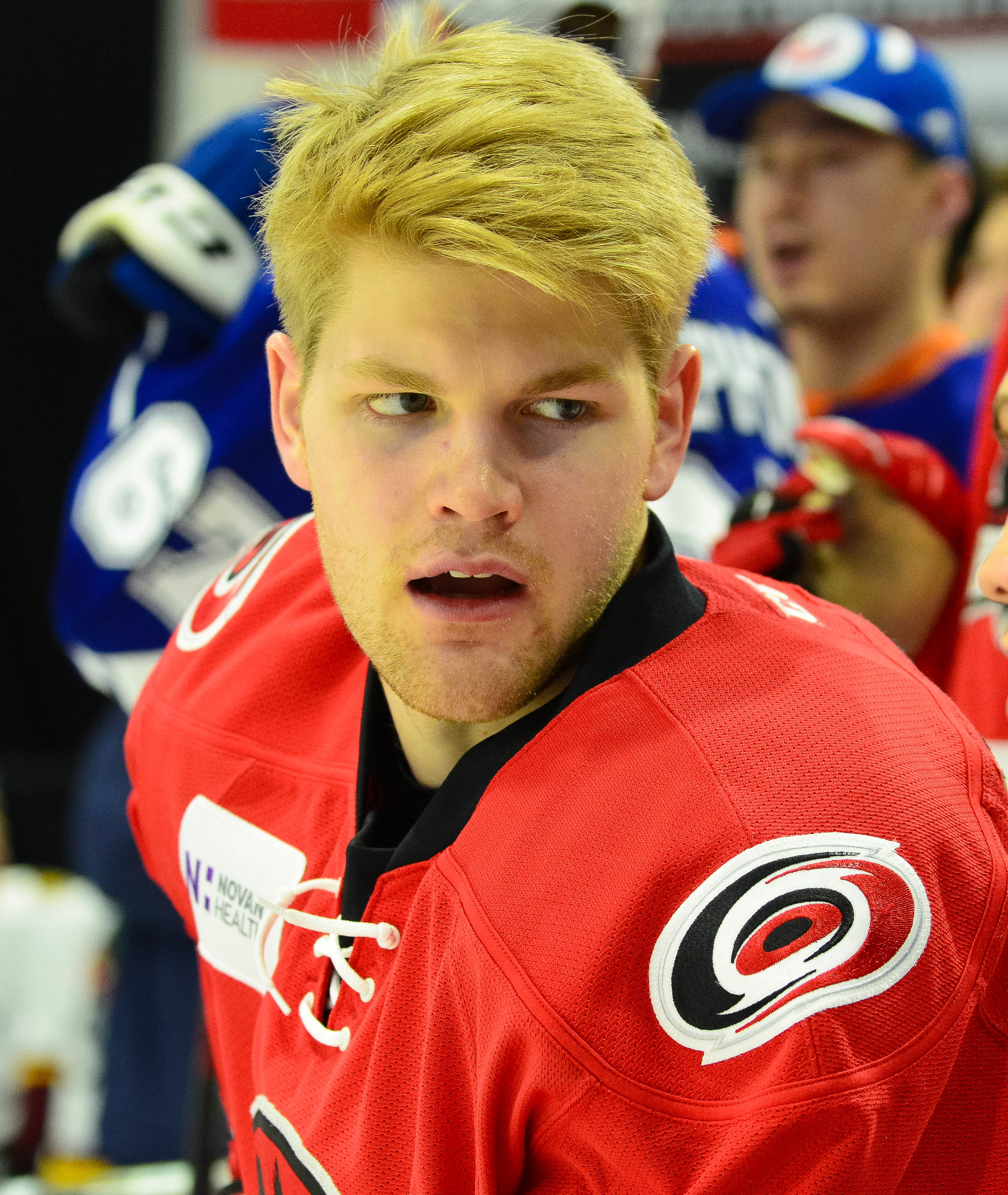
- Foegele with the Charlotte Checkers in 2018
- Born: April 1, 1996 (age 30) Markham, Ontario, Canada
- Height: 6 ft 2 in (188 cm)
- Weight: 205 lb (93 kg; 14 st 9 lb)
- Position: Forward
- Shoots: Left
- NHL team Former teams: Ottawa Senators; Carolina Hurricanes; Edmonton Oilers; Los Angeles Kings
- NHL draft: 67th overall, 2014; Carolina Hurricanes
- Playing career: 2017–present

Warren Foegele (/ˈfoʊɡəl/ FOH-gəl; born April 1, 1996) is a Canadian professional ice hockey player who is a forward for the Ottawa Senators of the National Hockey League (NHL). He was drafted by the Carolina Hurricanes in the third round, 67th overall, at the 2014 NHL entry draft. He has also played for the Edmonton Oilers and Los Angeles Kings.

== Playing career ==
=== Amateur ===
Foegele played at St. Andrew's College from 2011 to 2014, and served as an alternate captain starting in 2013. He was named a CISAA All-Star and team MVP after he helped lead St. Andrew's College to a CISAA Championship.

Despite accepting his scholarship invitation to the University of New Hampshire, Foegele was selected by the Kingston Frontenacs of the Ontario Hockey League (OHL) in the seventh round of the 2014 OHL Priority Selection. In his first season with the New Hampshire Wildcats in 2014–15, Foegele registered five goals and 13 points in 34 games. He began his sophomore season with the Wildcats in 2015–16, making five appearances and registering one assist. In October 2015, Foegele announced that he was transferring to the Frontenacs to continue his development. On his new team, he was shifted from the wing to the centre position and flourished with Spencer Watson and Michael Dal Colle. In 52 games with Kingston, he added 13 goals and 48 points. The Frontenacs advanced to the conference semifinals in the playoffs where they were eliminated by the Niagara IceDogs. In nine playoff games, he added eight goals and ten points. He returned to the Frontenacs for the 2016–17 season and in 28 games he recorded 11 goals and 31 points.

On January 2, 2017, Foegele was traded by the Frontenacs to the Erie Otters in exchange for Brett Neumann. In 33 games with Erie, he tallied 16 goals and 32 points. The Otters qualified for the playoffs and advanced to the OHL championship series, where they defeated the Mississauga Steelheads to win the J. Ross Robertson Cup. At the end of the 2017 playoffs, Foegele was awarded the Wayne Gretzky 99 Award as the most valuable player of the playoffs. As one of the league champions of the Canadian Hockey League, the Otters were invited to participate in the 2017 Memorial Cup, a round-robin tournament of the three Canadian league champions and a host team. The Otters made it to the Memorial Cup championship game where they were defeated by the host Windsor Spitfires, 4–3.

=== Professional ===
Foegele was selected by the Carolina Hurricanes of the National Hockey League (NHL) in the third round, 67th overall, in the 2014 NHL entry draft. Foegele agreed to an entry-level contract with the Hurricanes on March 31, 2017. He started the 2017–18 season with the Hurricanes' American Hockey League (AHL) affiliate, the Charlotte Checkers. Foegele was named to the AHL All-Star Game after he led all rookies in goals and was tied for third in the league. Foegele was suspended for one game on March 19, 2018, for boarding during a game against the Binghamton Devils. He was called up to the NHL for the first time on March 25. Foegele played in his first NHL game the following day against the Ottawa Senators where he scored his first NHL goal and recorded his first NHL assist in his debut to help the Hurricanes win 4–1. He was sent back to the AHL after playing in two games and recording three points. In 73 games with Charlotte, he tallied 28 goals and 46 points. Foegele was named the Checkers' Rookie of the Year following the team's elimination from the 2018 Calder Cup playoffs by the Lehigh Valley Phantoms in the Eastern Conference semifinals. In eight playoff games, he marked three assists.

After participating at the Hurricanes training camp, Foegele started the 2018–19 season with the Hurricanes. Foegele began the season as a winger to Jordan Staal and Justin Williams, collecting five points in the first seven games. However, he experienced a 27-game scoring drought following October 9, 2018, which was snapped in a 3–0 win over the Arizona Coyotes on December 16. In 77 games with Carolina, he notched ten goals and 15 points. He finished the season with the Hurricanes, who qualified for the 2019 Stanley Cup playoffs and played their first round series against the Washington Capitals. On April 18, 2019, Foegele set a new franchise record for fastest postseason goal at 17 seconds, while the Hurricanes would win the game 2–1 to tie the series. On May 3, Foegele recorded an assist and tied Erik Cole's 2002 record for most points by a Hurricanes/Hartford Whalers rookie in the postseason. The Hurricanes reached the Eastern Conference final, where they were swept by the Boston Bruins in four games. In 15 playoff games, Foegele added five goals and nine points.

After his successful rookie season, Foegele again made the Hurricanes lineup for the 2019–20 NHL season. In a 4–0 win over the Calgary Flames on December 14, 2019, he became the fifth player in Hurricanes/Whalers history to record two shorthanded goals in a game. However, on March 12, 2020, the season was suspended by the NHL due to the ongoing COVID-19 pandemic. He ended the shortened season with a new career high in goals with 13, assists with 17, points with 30, and ranked tied for fifth in the league in shorthanded goals. When play resumed in August with the playoffs, Carolina made it out of the qualifying round and met the Bruins again, who eliminated them for the second consecutive year. In eight playoff games, Foegele scored one goal. As an unrestricted free agent, Foegele signed a one-year, $2.15 million contract to remain with the Hurricanes for the 2020–21 season on November 1, 2020. In the pandemic-shortened 2020–21 season, Foegele scored ten goals and 20 points. The Hurricanes qualified for the playoffs but were eliminated by the Tampa Bay Lightning in the second round. In ten playoff games, he tallied one goal and two points.

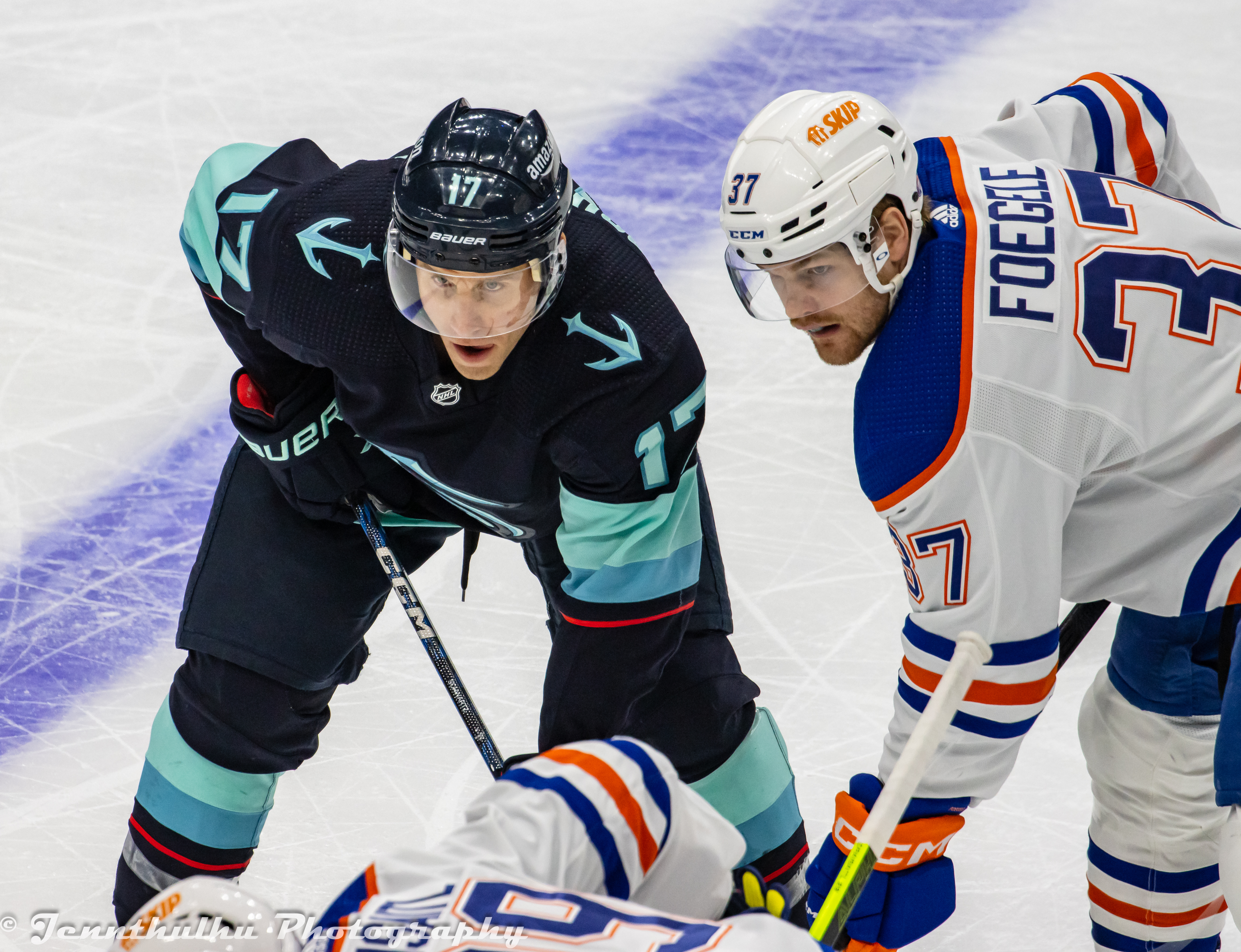
Foegele (right) and Jaden Schwartz during a game in 2023.

As an impending restricted free agent with the Hurricanes and unable to agree to terms, Foegele was traded to the Edmonton Oilers for defenceman Ethan Bear on July 28, 2021. He was quickly signed by the Oilers in finalizing a three-year contract extension on July 31. On December 31, 2023, Foegele scored five points in a single game for the first time in his career, with two goals and three assists in a 7–2 win over the Anaheim Ducks. He made his Oilers debut on October 13 in the team's 2021–22 season opener, a 3–2 shootout victory over the Vancouver Canucks. In the Oilers' next game on October 16, Foegele earned his first point with the team, tallying an assist on Derek Ryan's first period goal in a 5–2 victory over the Flames. He scored his first goal for Edmonton on October 21 in a 5–1 win over the Coyotes. In his first season with Edmonton, he appeared in all 82 regular season games, marking 12 goals and 26 points. Late in the season he was placed on a line with Ryan Nugent-Hopkins and Derek Ryan, which saw his offensive production improve. He made his postseason debut for Edmonton on May 2, 2022 in a 4–3 game one loss to the Los Angeles Kings. The Oilers went on to eliminate the Kings, and then the Flames before falling to the Colorado Avalanche in the Western Conference final. In 13 playoff games, he registered one assist.

To start the 2022–23 season, he was placed on a line with Nugent-Hopkins and Ryan McLeod. However, in November he was injured in a collision with the New York Rangers's Vincent Trocheck and missed ten games. After his return he was placed on the second line with Leon Draisaitl and Zach Hyman, having been moved up the lineup due to an injury to Evander Kane. He finished the season with 13 goals and 28 points in 67 games. He was placed on the Oilers' third line with Derek Ryan and Nugent-Hopkins for the playoffs, tasked with shutting down the opposing teams' top line. The Oilers were eliminated by the Vegas Golden Knights in the second round. In 12 playoff games, he added two goals and three points. In 2023–24, he split time between the second and third lines. On December 31, 2023, he set single game career-highs scoring two goals and five points in a 7–2 victory over the Anaheim Ducks. He finished the season appearing in all 82 games, scoring a new career high 20 goals and 41 points. The Oilers once again made the playoffs and advanced to the final where they were beat by the Florida Panthers. In 22 playoff games, he added three goals and eight points.

As an unrestricted free agent for the first time in his career, Foegele signed a three-year, $10.5 million contract with the Los Angeles Kings on July 1, 2024. He made his Kings debut on opening night on October 10, 2024, in a 3–1 victory over the Buffalo Sabres. He marked his first goal and point with the Kings on October 22, scoring the team's lone goal in a 6–1 loss to the Golden Knights. He was most regularly assigned to the third line in Los Angeles with Phillip Danault and Trevor Moore. He set new career highs with 24 goals, 22 assists for 46 points and played in all 82 games. The Kings made the playoffs and faced the Oilers for the fourth consecutive season in the opening round. They were eliminated by the Oilers for the fourth consecutive season and Foegele added one goal and three points in the series. He returned to the Kings for the 2025–26 season, but struggled during the season. He suffered an injury in to his shoulder and missed two weeks in November. He made 47 appearances, scoring seven goals and nine points.

On March 5, 2026, Foegele was traded to the Ottawa Senators, with a conditional 2026 third-round pick, for second and third-round picks in 2026. He made his Senators debut on March 7 against the Seattle Kraken, playing on the team's fourth line alongside Lars Eller and Fabian Zetterlund. He scored in his debut and in 21 games with Ottawa, he recorded six goals and eight points. The Senators made the playoffs, but were swept in the first round by the Carolina Hurricanes. Foegele went scoreless in the four games.

== Personal life ==
Foegele was born to George and Leslie Foegele and grew up in Markham, Ontario with his older brother Reese. Reese was also an athlete; he previously played junior ice hockey and later lacrosse at Wilfrid Laurier University.

== Career statistics ==
			Regular season					Playoffs
Season	Team	League	GP	G	A	Pts	PIM	GP	G	A	Pts	PIM
2011–12	St. Andrew's College	CISAA	1	0	0	0	0	—	—	—	—	—
2012–13	St. Andrew's College	CISAA	15	9	10	19	20	5	3	2	5	6
2013–14	St. Andrew's College	CISAA	14	17	6	23	15	5	5	4	9	10
2014–15	University of New Hampshire	HE	34	5	11	16	26	—	—	—	—	—
2015–16	University of New Hampshire	HE	5	0	1	1	4	—	—	—	—	—
2015–16	Kingston Frontenacs	OHL	52	13	35	48	44	9	8	2	10	12
2016–17	Kingston Frontenacs	OHL	28	11	20	31	20	—	—	—	—	—
2016–17	Erie Otters	OHL	33	16	16	32	20	22	13	13	26	25
2017–18	Charlotte Checkers	AHL	73	28	18	46	40	8	0	3	3	12
2017–18	Carolina Hurricanes	NHL	2	2	1	3	0	—	—	—	—	—
2018–19	Carolina Hurricanes	NHL	77	10	5	15	20	15	5	4	9	6
2019–20	Carolina Hurricanes	NHL	68	13	17	30	34	8	1	0	1	2
2020–21	Carolina Hurricanes	NHL	53	10	10	20	20	10	1	1	2	10
2021–22	Edmonton Oilers	NHL	82	12	14	26	24	13	0	1	1	2
2022–23	Edmonton Oilers	NHL	67	13	15	28	28	12	2	1	3	16
2023–24	Edmonton Oilers	NHL	82	20	21	41	47	22	3	5	8	25
2024–25	Los Angeles Kings	NHL	82	24	22	46	24	6	1	2	3	0
2025–26	Los Angeles Kings	NHL	47	7	2	9	14	—	—	—	—	—
2025–26	Ottawa Senators	NHL	21	6	2	8	4	4	0	0	0	0
NHL totals			581	117	109	226	215	90	13	14	27	61

== Awards and honours ==
Award	Year	Ref
OHL
Wayne Gretzky 99 Award	2017	
AHL
All-Star Game	2018	
