= Dmitry Kulikov (ice hockey) =

Russian ice hockey player (born 1990)

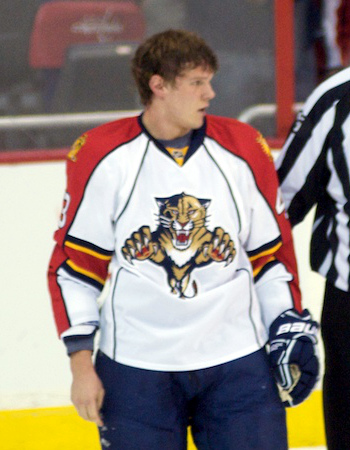
- Kulikov with the Florida Panthers in 2010
- Born: 29 October 1990 (age 35) Lipetsk, Russian SFSR, Soviet Union
- Height: 6 ft 1 in (185 cm)
- Weight: 204 lb (93 kg; 14 st 8 lb)
- Position: Defence
- Shoots: Left
- NHL team Former teams: Florida Panthers; Lokomotiv Yaroslavl; Buffalo Sabres; Winnipeg Jets; New Jersey Devils; Edmonton Oilers; Minnesota Wild; Anaheim Ducks; Pittsburgh Penguins
- National team: Russia
- NHL draft: 14th overall, 2009; Florida Panthers
- Playing career: 2009–present

Dmitry Vladimirovich Kulikov (Russian: Дми́трий Влади́мирович Кулико́в; born 29 October 1990) is a Russian professional ice hockey player who is a defenceman for the Florida Panthers of the National Hockey League (NHL). He was drafted by the Panthers in the first round, 14th overall, at the 2009 NHL entry draft. He has previously played for the Buffalo Sabres, Winnipeg Jets, New Jersey Devils, Edmonton Oilers, Minnesota Wild, Anaheim Ducks and the Pittsburgh Penguins. Kulikov won back-to-back Stanley Cups with the Panthers in 2024 and 2025.

== Playing career ==
=== Junior ===
Kulikov began his career in his homeland Russia with Lokomotiv-2 Yaroslavl in the Pervaya Liga, and left his club in November 2008 to sign for the Drummondville Voltigeurs of the Quebec Major Junior Hockey League (QMJHL) in North America. In his lone season with Drummondville, Kulikov led all QMJHL defencemen with 62 points in 57 games, and took home a slew of post-season awards, including the Emile Bouchard Trophy as the QMJHL Defenceman of the Year, the Raymond Lagacé Trophy as the Defensive Rookie of the Year and the Mike Bossy Trophy as the League's top professional prospect.

=== Professional ===
After his rookie year with the Voltigeurs, Kulikov was drafted by the Florida Panthers 14th overall in the 2009 NHL entry draft, and was later signed to a professional contract with the club on 29 September 2009.

Despite his age, Kulikov managed to play in 68 games with Florida in his rookie season, 2009–10, displaying high levels of skill and confidence. Panthers General Manager Dale Tallon expressed that the Panthers organization had high expectations of Kulikov for the future.

On 18 July 2014, Kulikov signed a three-year, $13 million contract extension with the Panthers, worth $4.3 million annually.

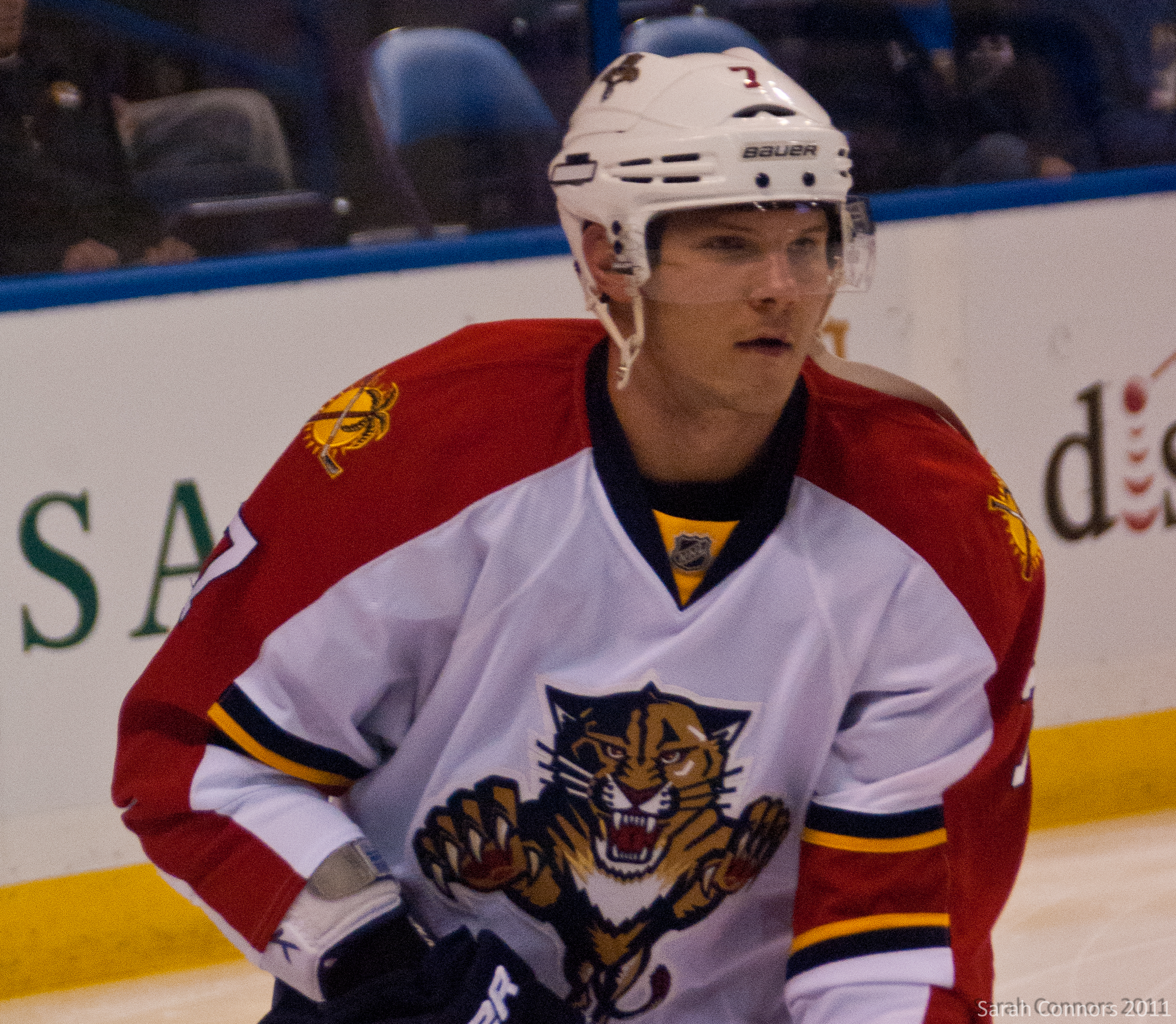
Kulikov in a game against the St. Louis Blues in 2011.

On 25 June 2016, Kulikov was traded to the Buffalo Sabres, along with the 33rd overall pick in the 2016 NHL Draft in exchange for defenceman Mark Pysyk and picks 38 and 89 in the 2016 draft. In the 2016–17 season, Kulikov's time with the Sabres was largely affected through injury. In the last year of his contract, he appeared in 47 games to produce a career low 2 goals and 5 points.

On 1 July 2017, as a free agent from his disappointing tenure with the Sabres, Kulikov was signed to a three-year, $12 million contract with the Winnipeg Jets.

After the completion of his contract with the Jets, Kulikov left as a free agent and on 22 October 2020, he was signed to a one-year, $1.15 million contract with the New Jersey Devils. In the pandemic delayed 2020–21 season, Kulikov brought a sound defensive game to the Devils, registering 2 assists through 38 regular season games. With the Devils out of playoff contention, Kulikov was dealt at the trade deadline to the Edmonton Oilers in exchange for a conditional fourth-round selection in 2022 on 12 April 2021.

At the conclusion of his contract with the Oilers, Kulikov left as a free agent and on 28 July 2021, was signed to a two-year, $4.5 million contract with the Minnesota Wild.

After one season with the Wild, Kulikov was traded to the Anaheim Ducks for future considerations on 31 August 2022.

On 3 March 2023, the Ducks traded Kulikov to the Pittsburgh Penguins in exchange for Brock McGinn and a third-round pick in the 2024 NHL entry draft.

As a free agent from the Penguins, Kulikov opted to return to his original club after seven seasons away, signing a one-year, $1 million contract with the Florida Panthers for the 2023–24 season on 1 July 2023. After winning the Stanley Cup with the Panthers, Kulikov signed a four-year contract to stay with the Panthers.

== International play ==
Medal record

Men's ice hockey

Representing Russia

World Championships
Silver medal – second place	2010 Germany	
Silver medal – second place	2015 Czech Republic	

Kulikov represented Russia under-18 team in 2007 and 2008 World U18 Championships. He was then a member of Russia junior team at the 2009 World Junior Championships.

== Career statistics ==
=== Regular season and playoffs ===
			Regular season					Playoffs
Season	Team	League	GP	G	A	Pts	PIM	GP	G	A	Pts	PIM
2007–08	Lokomotiv–2 Yaroslavl	RUS.3	32	6	13	19	54	—	—	—	—	—
2008–09	Drummondville Voltigeurs	QMJHL	57	12	50	62	46	19	2	17	19	16
2009–10	Florida Panthers	NHL	68	3	13	16	32	—	—	—	—	—
2010–11	Florida Panthers	NHL	72	6	20	26	45	—	—	—	—	—
2011–12	Florida Panthers	NHL	58	4	24	28	36	7	0	1	1	4
2012–13	Lokomotiv Yaroslavl	KHL	22	3	3	6	28	—	—	—	—	—
2012–13	Florida Panthers	NHL	34	3	7	10	22	—	—	—	—	—
2013–14	Florida Panthers	NHL	81	8	11	19	66	—	—	—	—	—
2014–15	Florida Panthers	NHL	73	3	19	22	48	—	—	—	—	—
2015–16	Florida Panthers	NHL	74	1	16	17	51	6	1	3	4	4
2016–17	Buffalo Sabres	NHL	47	2	3	5	26	—	—	—	—	—
2017–18	Winnipeg Jets	NHL	62	3	8	11	22	1	0	0	0	2
2018–19	Winnipeg Jets	NHL	57	0	6	6	47	6	0	0	0	4
2019–20	Winnipeg Jets	NHL	51	2	8	10	32	4	0	2	2	4
2020–21	New Jersey Devils	NHL	38	0	2	2	26	—	—	—	—	—
2020–21	Edmonton Oilers	NHL	10	0	2	2	2	3	0	0	0	0
2021–22	Minnesota Wild	NHL	80	7	17	24	39	2	0	1	1	2
2022–23	Anaheim Ducks	NHL	61	3	12	15	30	—	—	—	—	—
2022–23	Pittsburgh Penguins	NHL	6	0	1	1	4	—	—	—	—	—
2023–24	Florida Panthers	NHL	76	1	19	20	63	24	0	2	2	16
2024–25	Florida Panthers	NHL	70	4	9	13	38	23	2	3	5	14
2025–26	Florida Panthers	NHL	19	0	0	0	10	—	—	—	—	—
NHL totals			1,037	50	197	247	639	76	3	12	15	50

=== International ===
Year	Team	Event	Result	GP	G	A	Pts	PIM
2007	Russia	U18	1st place, gold medalist(s)	7	0	4	4	6
2007	Russia	IH18	3rd place, bronze medalist(s)	4	0	0	0	31
2008	Russia	U18	2nd place, silver medalist(s)	6	0	2	2	6
2009	Russia	WJC	3rd place, bronze medalist(s)	7	0	4	4	4
2010	Russia	WC	2nd place, silver medalist(s)	9	0	2	2	8
2011	Russia	WC	4th	9	2	1	3	4
2015	Russia	WC	2nd place, silver medalist(s)	10	0	2	2	8
2016	Russia	WCH	4th	4	0	0	0	0
Junior totals				24	0	10	10	47
Senior totals				32	2	5	7	20

== Awards and honours ==
Award	Year	Ref
NHL
Stanley Cup champion	2024, 2025	

Awards and achievements
Preceded by Keaton Ellerby	Florida Panthers first-round draft pick 2009	Succeeded by Erik Gudbranson
