= 2024–25 Florida Panthers season =

National Hockey League season

2024–25 Florida Panthers
- Stanley Cup champions
- Eastern Conference champions
- Division: 3rd Atlantic
- Conference: 5th Eastern
- 2024–25 record: 47–31–4
- Home record: 27–12–2
- Road record: 20–19–2
- Goals for: 252
- Goals against: 223

Team information
- General manager: Bill Zito
- Coach: Paul Maurice
- Captain: Aleksander Barkov
- Alternate captains: Aaron Ekblad; Matthew Tkachuk
- Arena: Amerant Bank Arena
- Average attendance: 19,059
- Minor league affiliates: Charlotte Checkers (AHL); Savannah Ghost Pirates (ECHL)

Team leaders
- Goals: Sam Reinhart (39)
- Assists: Aleksander Barkov (51)
- Points: Sam Reinhart (81)
- Penalty minutes: A. J. Greer (130)
- Plus/minus: Gustav Forsling (+33)
- Wins: Sergei Bobrovsky (33)
- Goals against average: Spencer Knight (2.40)

The 2024–25 Florida Panthers season was the 31st season for the National Hockey League (NHL) franchise that was established in 1993. The Panthers entered the season as the defending Stanley Cup champions having defeated the Edmonton Oilers in seven games in the 2024 Stanley Cup Final.

On April 5, 2025, the Panthers clinched a playoff spot for the sixth straight season following the Columbus Blue Jackets loss to the Toronto Maple Leafs.

In the playoffs, the Panthers defeated the Tampa Bay Lightning in five games in the first round, defeated the Toronto Maple Leafs in seven games in the second round, defeated the Carolina Hurricanes in five games in the Eastern Conference finals, and made the 2025 Stanley Cup Final for the third consecutive season where they defeated the Edmonton Oilers in six games in a rematch of the previous Stanley Cup Final. The Panthers scored 94 playoff goals, the fourth-most by a team in NHL history, behind only the 1980–81 New York Islanders, 1984–85 Edmonton Oilers, and 1990–91 Pittsburgh Penguins, all of whom played in an era of high-scoring offense in the 1980s and early 1990s.

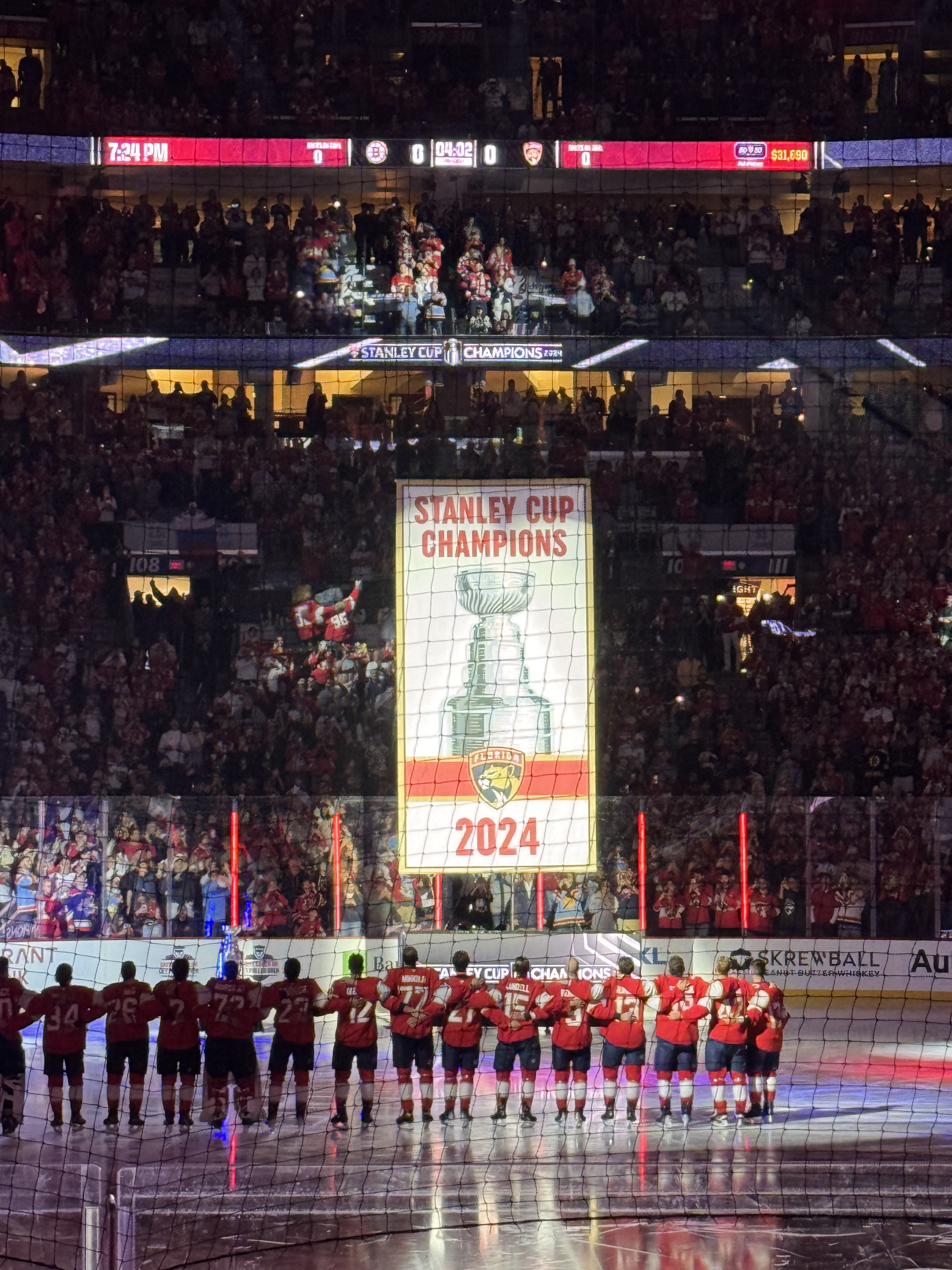
Members of the Panthers watch as the Stanley Cup championship banner is raised into the rafters at Amerant Bank Arena before the home opener against the Boston Bruins.

== Previous season ==
The Florida Panthers finished as the top seed in the Atlantic Division and met the in-state rival Tampa Bay Lightning in the first round of the 2024 Stanley Cup playoffs. The Panthers eliminated the Lightning in five games. They then faced the Boston Bruins in the second round, winning the series in six games. The Panthers defeated the New York Rangers in the conference finals in six games, advancing to the Stanley Cup Final for the second consecutive season.

In the 2024 Stanley Cup Final series matchup against the Edmonton Oilers, the Panthers initially held a 3–0 lead before experiencing defeats in the following three games. The Panthers recovered and defeated the Oilers 2–1 in game 7 at home. This victory clinched the franchise's first Stanley Cup championship in its 30 years of existence.

== Off-season ==
The off-season saw the Panthers lose several key depth pieces. Oliver Ekman-Larsson, Anthony Stolarz, Vladimir Tarasenko, Brandon Montour, Kevin Stenlund, Ryan Lomberg, and Josh Mahura left in free agency. Ekman-Larsson and Stolarz both signed with the Toronto Maple Leafs, Tarasenko with the Detroit Red Wings, Montour and Mahura with the Seattle Kraken, Stenlund with the Utah Hockey Club, and Lomberg with the Calgary Flames. Kyle Okposo announced his retirement on September 19, 2024.

The Panthers changed their ECHL affiliate and were affiliated with the Savannah Ghost Pirates after having been paired with the Florida Everblades for the past two seasons.

After airing their games on Bally Sports Florida (formerly Fox Sports Florida and SportsChannel Florida) for the majority of the Panthers existence, Scripps Sports started producing and broadcasting Panthers games. The broadcasts were free over-the-air on local channels WSFL-TV 39 in Miami-Fort, Lauderdale, WHDT-TV 9 in Stuart-West Palm Beach, and WFTX 36.3 in Fort Myers-Naples. Additionally, Scripps Sports created a streaming platform to allow fans to stream the games within the broadcast region.

To commemorate the 2024 Stanley Cup win, the Panthers designed a special center ice face-off logo. The Panthers filled in the circle with red and surrounding it was the famous embossed pattern from the bowl of the Stanley Cup. The Panthers used gold for the pattern to make it look like rays of the sun, being they play in the Sunshine State.

== NHL 4 Nations Face-Off ==
The NHL 4 Nations Face-Off was an ice hockey tournament that took place from February 12 to 20, 2025. The tournament replaced the NHL's annual All-Star Game for 2025. In the tournament, teams representing Canada, Finland, Sweden, and the United States played each other in a round-robin format, followed by a one-game final between the two top-placed teams.

On June 28, 2024, Aleksander Barkov was named to Finland team, Gustav Forsling was named to Sweden team, and Matthew Tkachuk was named to the United States team. Panthers' assistant coach Tuomo Ruutu was named as an assistant coach of Finland.

The remaining roster was announced on December 4, 2024. Sam Reinhart and Sam Bennett joined Canada. Anton Lundell, Eetu Luostarinen, and Niko Mikkola joined Finland. Gustav Forsling joined Sweden with scouting and development consultant Patric Hornqvist and assistant coach Myles Fee joining as staff. General manager Bill Zito and equipment manager Teddy Richards joined the United States as staff.

The Panthers led the league with eight players selected for the tournament.

Canada beat the United States in the final with Reinhart, Bennett, and future Panther Brad Marchand in the lineup.

== Standings ==
=== Divisional standings ===
Atlantic Division
Pos	Team	GP	W	L	OTL	RW	GF	GA	GD	Pts
1	y – Toronto Maple Leafs	82	52	26	4	41	268	231	+37	108
2	x – Tampa Bay Lightning	82	47	27	8	41	294	219	+75	102
3	x – Florida Panthers	82	47	31	4	37	252	223	+29	98
4	x – Ottawa Senators	82	45	30	7	35	243	234	+9	97
5	x – Montreal Canadiens	82	40	31	11	30	245	265	−20	91
6	Detroit Red Wings	82	39	35	8	30	238	259	−21	86
7	Buffalo Sabres	82	36	39	7	29	269	289	−20	79
8	Boston Bruins	82	33	39	10	26	222	272	−50	76

Source: National Hockey League
Rules for classification: 1) Fewer number of games played (GP, only during regular season); 2) Greater number of regulation wins (RW); 3) Greater number of wins in regulation and overtime, excluding shootout wins (ROW); 4) Greater number of total wins, including shootouts (W); 5) Greater number of points earned in head-to-head play; if teams played an uneven number of head-to-head games, the result of the first game on the home ice of the team with the extra home game is discarded; 6) Greater goal differential (GD); 7) Greater number of goals scored (GF)
x – Clinched playoff spot; y – Clinched division

=== Conference standings ===
Eastern Conference Wild Card
Pos	Div	Team	GP	W	L	OTL	RW	GF	GA	GD	Pts
1	AT	x – Ottawa Senators	82	45	30	7	35	243	234	+9	97
2	AT	x – Montreal Canadiens	82	40	31	11	30	245	265	−20	91
3	ME	Columbus Blue Jackets	82	40	33	9	30	273	268	+5	89
4	AT	Detroit Red Wings	82	39	35	8	30	238	259	−21	86
5	ME	New York Rangers	82	39	36	7	35	256	255	+1	85
6	ME	New York Islanders	82	35	35	12	28	224	260	−36	82
7	ME	Pittsburgh Penguins	82	34	36	12	24	243	293	−50	80
8	AT	Buffalo Sabres	82	36	39	7	29	269	289	−20	79
9	AT	Boston Bruins	82	33	39	10	26	222	272	−50	76
10	ME	Philadelphia Flyers	82	33	39	10	21	238	286	−48	76

Source: National Hockey League
Rules for classification: 1) Fewer number of games played (GP, only during regular season); 2) Greater number of regulation wins (RW); 3) Greater number of wins in regulation and overtime, excluding shootout wins (ROW); 4) Greater number of total wins, including shootouts (W); 5) Greater number of points earned in head-to-head play; if teams played an uneven number of head-to-head games, the result of the first game on the home ice of the team with the extra home game is discarded; 6) Greater goal differential (GD); 7) Greater number of goals scored (GF)
x – Clinched playoff spot

== Schedule and results ==
The preseason schedule was published on June 23, 2024.

2024 preseason game log: 5–3–0 (Home: 3–1–0; Road: 2–2–0)
#	Date	Visitor	Score	Home	OT	Decision	Attendance	Record	Recap
1 ^{[A]}	September 22	Nashville	2–3	Florida		Knight	8,076	1–0–0
2 ^{[A]}	September 22	Nashville	2–6	Florida		Bobrovsky	8,076	2–0–0
3 ^{[B]}	September 25	Florida	7–8	Tampa Bay		Driedger	15,899	2–1–0
4	September 27	Florida	2–8	Carolina		Knight	14,875	2–2–0
5	September 28	Carolina	4–5	Florida	OT	Driedger	14,702	3–2–0
6	September 30	Tampa Bay	3–1	Florida		Knight	14,013	3–3–0
7	October 2	Florida	2–1	Tampa Bay	OT	Knight	11,270	4–3–0
8 ^{[C]}	October 5	Florida	4–2	Los Angeles		Bobrovsky	17,320	5–3–0
Notes:^{A} Indicates split-squad. ^{B} Played at Kia Center in Orlando, Florida. ^{C} Played at Videotron Centre in Quebec City, Quebec.

=== Regular season ===
The regular season schedule was published on July 2, 2024.

2024–25 game log

October: 7–3–1 (Home: 2–1–1; Road: 5–2–0)
#	Date	Visitor	Score	Home	OT	Decision	Attendance	Record	Pts	Recap
1	October 8	Boston	4–6	Florida		Bobrovsky	19,813	1–0–0	2
2	October 10	Florida	1–3	Ottawa		Bobrovsky	19,346	1–1–0	2
3	October 12	Florida	2–5	Buffalo		Knight	16,644	1–2–0	2
4	October 14	Florida	4–3	Boston		Bobrovsky	17,850	2–2–0	4
5	October 15	Florida	4–3	Columbus		Knight	18,484	3–2–0	6
6	October 17	Vancouver	3–2	Florida	OT	Bobrovsky	17,865	3–2–1	7
7	October 19	Vegas	3–4	Florida	OT	Bobrovsky	19,572	4–2–1	9
8	October 22	Minnesota	5–1	Florida		Bobrovsky	18,264	4–3–1	9
9	October 24	Florida	3–1	NY Rangers		Bobrovsky	18,006	5–3–1	11
10	October 26	Florida	6–3	NY Islanders		Knight	15,807	6–3–1	13
11	October 28	Florida	5–2	Buffalo		Bobrovsky	12,906	7–3–1	15

November: 8–6–0 (Home: 6–4–0; Road: 2–2–0)
#	Date	Visitor	Score	Home	OT	Decision	Attendance	Record	Pts	Recap
12^{[A]}	November 1	Florida	6–4	Dallas		Bobrovsky	12,786	8–3–1	17
13^{[A]}	November 2	Dallas	2–4	Florida		Knight	12,807	9–3–1	19
14	November 7	Nashville	2–6	Florida		Bobrovsky	18,264	10–3–1	21
15	November 9	Philadelphia	3–4	Florida	SO	Bobrovsky	19,547	11–3–1	23
16	November 12	New Jersey	4–1	Florida		Knight	18,677	11–4–1	23
17	November 14	New Jersey	6–2	Florida		Bobrovsky	18,573	11–5–1	23
18	November 16	Winnipeg	0–5	Florida		Bobrovsky	19,157	12–5–1	25
19	November 19	Florida	3–6	Winnipeg		Bobrovsky	15,225	12–6–1	25
20	November 21	Florida	1–3	Chicago		Knight	19,107	12–7–1	25
21	November 23	Colorado	7–4	Florida		Bobrovsky	18,638	12–8–1	25
22	November 25	Washington	4–1	Florida		Knight	18,504	12–9–1	25
23	November 27	Toronto	1–5	Florida		Bobrovsky	18,563	13–9–1	27
24	November 29	Florida	6–3	Carolina		Bobrovsky	18,920	14–9–1	29
25	November 30	Carolina	0–6	Florida		Knight	18,648	15–9–1	31

December: 8–4–1 (Home: 3–2–0; Road: 5–2–1)
#	Date	Visitor	Score	Home	OT	Decision	Attendance	Record	Pts	Recap
26	December 3	Florida	4–5	Pittsburgh	OT	Knight	15,502	15–9–2	32
27	December 5	Florida	7–5	Philadelphia		Knight	18,206	16–9–2	34
28	December 7	San Jose	1–3	Florida		Bobrovsky	18,646	17–9–2	36
29	December 10	Florida	2–1	Seattle	SO	Bobrovsky	17,151	18–9–2	38
30	December 12	Florida	0–4	Vancouver		Bobrovsky	18,614	18–10–2	38
31	December 14	Florida	0–3	Calgary		Knight	18,018	18–11–2	38
32	December 16	Florida	6–5	Edmonton		Bobrovsky	18,347	19–11–2	40
33	December 18	Florida	6–1	Minnesota		Bobrovsky	17,423	20–11–2	42
34	December 20	St. Louis	1–2	Florida	OT	Bobrovsky	18,522	21–11–2	44
35	December 22	Florida	4–2	Tampa Bay		Knight	19,092	22–11–2	46
36	December 23	Tampa Bay	4–0	Florida		Bobrovsky	19,544	22–12–2	46
37	December 28	Montreal	4–0	Florida		Knight	19,483	22–13–2	46
38	December 30	NY Rangers	3–5	Florida		Bobrovsky	19,556	23–13–2	48

January: 7–6–1 (Home: 3–2–1; Road: 4–4–0)
#	Date	Visitor	Score	Home	OT	Decision	Attendance	Record	Pts	Recap
39	January 2	Carolina	3–1	Florida		Bobrovsky	19,434	23–14–2	48
40	January 3	Pittsburgh	2–3	Florida	SO	Knight	19,543	24–14–2	50
41	January 6	Florida	1–3	Colorado		Bobrovsky	18,024	24–15–2	50
42	January 8	Florida	4–1	Utah		Bobrovsky	11,131	25–15–2	52
43	January 11	Boston	4–3	Florida	OT	Bobrovsky	19,687	25–15–3	53
44	January 13	Florida	3–4	Philadelphia		Bobrovsky	19,293	25–16–3	53
45	January 14	Florida	2–1	New Jersey	SO	Knight	16,514	26–16–3	55
46	January 16	Detroit	5–2	Florida		Bobrovsky	19,486	26–17–3	55
47	January 18	Anaheim	0–3	Florida		Knight	19,395	27–17–3	57
48	January 21	Florida	5–2	Anaheim		Bobrovsky	14,694	28–17–3	59
49	January 22	Florida	1–2	Los Angeles		Knight	15,090	28–18–3	59
50	January 25	Florida	7–2	San Jose		Bobrovsky	17,435	29–18–3	61
51	January 26	Florida	1–4	Vegas		Knight	17,716	29–19–3	61
52	January 29	Los Angeles	0–3	Florida		Bobrovsky	19,515	30–19–3	63

February: 6–2–0 (Home: 4–1–0; Road: 2–1–0)
#	Date	Visitor	Score	Home	OT	Decision	Attendance	Record	Pts	Recap
53	February 1	Chicago	1–5	Florida		Bobrovsky	19,457	31–19–3	65
54	February 2	NY Islanders	3–6	Florida		Knight	19,721	32–19–3	67
55	February 4	Florida	3–6	Washington		Bobrovsky	18,573	32–20–3	67
56	February 6	Florida	3–2	St. Louis		Knight	17,230	33–20–3	69
57	February 8	Ottawa	1–5	Florida		Bobrovsky	19,660	34–20–3	71
58	February 22	Seattle	2–1	Florida		Bobrovsky	19,628	34–21–3	71
59	February 25	Florida	4–1	Nashville		Knight	17,159	35–21–3	73
60	February 27	Edmonton	3–4	Florida		Bobrovsky	19,456	36–21–3	75

March: 8–5–0 (Home: 6–1–0; Road: 2–4–0)
#	Date	Visitor	Score	Home	OT	Decision	Attendance	Record	Pts	Recap
61	March 1	Calgary	0–3	Florida		Bobrovsky	19,416	37–21–3	77
62	March 3	Tampa Bay	1–2	Florida		Bobrovsky	19,441	38–21–3	79
63	March 6	Columbus	0–3	Florida		Bobrovsky	19,402	39–21–3	81
64	March 8	Buffalo	0–4	Florida		Vanecek	19,559	40–21–3	83
65	March 11	Florida	2–3	Boston		Bobrovsky	17,850	40–22–3	83
66	March 13	Florida	3–2	Toronto		Bobrovsky	19,201	41–22–3	85
67	March 15	Florida	1–3	Montreal		Bobrovsky	21,105	41–23–3	85
68	March 16	Florida	2–4	NY Islanders		Vanecek	15,109	41–24–3	85
69	March 20	Florida	1–0	Columbus	OT	Bobrovsky	16,757	42–24–3	87
70	March 22	Florida	3–6	Washington		Vanecek	18,573	42–25–3	87
71	March 23	Pittsburgh	3–4	Florida	SO	Bobrovsky	19,525	43–25–3	89
72	March 28	Utah	1–2	Florida	OT	Bobrovsky	19,549	44–25–3	91
73	March 30	Montreal	4–2	Florida		Bobrovsky	19,432	44–26–3	91

April: 3–5–1 (Home: 3–1–0; Road: 0–4–1)
#	Date	Visitor	Score	Home	OT	Decision	Attendance	Record	Pts	Recap
74	April 1	Florida	2–3	Montreal	OT	Vanecek	21,105	44–26–4	92
75	April 2	Florida	2–3	Toronto		Bobrovsky	19,066	44–27–4	92
76	April 5	Florida	0–3	Ottawa		Bobrovsky	18,611	44–28–4	92
77	April 6	Florida	1–2	Detroit		Vanecek	19,515	44–29–4	92
78	April 8	Toronto	1–3	Florida		Bobrovsky	19,261	45–29–4	94
79	April 10	Detroit	1–4	Florida		Bobrovsky	19,448	46–29–4	96
80	April 12	Buffalo	2–3	Florida	SO	Vanecek	19,318	47–29–4	98
81	April 14	NY Rangers	5–3	Florida		Bobrovsky	19,453	47–30–4	98
82	April 15	Florida	1–5	Tampa Bay		Vanecek	19,092	47–31–4	98

Legend: Win (2 points) Loss (0 points) Overtime/shootout loss (1 point)
Notes:
^{A} Played at Nokia Arena in Tampere, Finland as a part of the 2024 NHL Global Series.

=== Playoffs ===
2025 Stanley Cup playoffs

Eastern Conference first round vs. (A2) Tampa Bay Lightning: Florida won 4–1
#	Date	Visitor	Score	Home	OT	Decision	Attendance	Series	Recap
1	April 22	Florida	6–2	Tampa Bay		Bobrovsky	19,092	1–0
2	April 24	Florida	2–0	Tampa Bay		Bobrovsky	19,092	2–0
3	April 26	Tampa Bay	5–1	Florida		Bobrovsky	19,587	2–1
4	April 28	Tampa Bay	2–4	Florida		Bobrovsky	19,551	3–1
5	April 30	Florida	6–3	Tampa Bay		Bobrovsky	19,092	4–1

Eastern Conference second round vs. (A1) Toronto Maple Leafs: Florida won 4–3
#	Date	Visitor	Score	Home	OT	Decision	Attendance	Series	Recap
1	May 5	Florida	4–5	Toronto		Bobrovsky	19,031	0–1
2	May 7	Florida	3–4	Toronto		Bobrovsky	19,261	0–2
3	May 9	Toronto	4–5	Florida	OT	Bobrovsky	19,842	1–2
4	May 11	Toronto	0–2	Florida		Bobrovsky	19,894	2–2
5	May 14	Florida	6–1	Toronto		Bobrovsky	19,319	3–2
6	May 16	Toronto	2–0	Florida		Bobrovsky	19,797	3–3
7	May 18	Florida	6–1	Toronto		Bobrovsky	19,426	4–3

Eastern Conference final vs. (M2) Carolina Hurricanes: Florida won 4–1
#	Date	Visitor	Score	Home	OT	Decision	Attendance	Series	Recap
1	May 20	Florida	5–2	Carolina		Bobrovsky	18,944	1–0
2	May 22	Florida	5–0	Carolina		Bobrovsky	18,971	2–0
3	May 24	Carolina	2–6	Florida		Bobrovsky	19,836	3–0
4	May 26	Carolina	3–0	Florida		Bobrovsky	19,897	3–1
5	May 28	Florida	5–3	Carolina		Bobrovsky	18,994	4–1

Stanley Cup Final vs. (P3) Edmonton Oilers: Florida won 4–2
#	Date	Visitor	Score	Home	OT	Decision	Attendance	Series	Recap
1	June 4	Florida	3–4	Edmonton	OT	Bobrovsky	18,347	0–1
2	June 6	Florida	5–4	Edmonton	2OT	Bobrovsky	18,347	1–1
3	June 9	Edmonton	1–6	Florida		Bobrovsky	19,863	2–1
4	June 12	Edmonton	5–4	Florida	OT	Bobrovsky	19,994	2–2
5	June 14	Florida	5–2	Edmonton		Bobrovsky	18,347	3–2
6	June 17	Edmonton	1–5	Florida		Bobrovsky	19,983	4–2

Legend: Win Loss

== Player statistics ==
=== Skaters ===
Regular season
Player	GP	G	A	Pts	+/−	PIM
Sam Reinhart	79	39	42	81	6	27
Aleksander Barkov	67	20	51	71	1	16
Matthew Tkachuk	52	22	35	57	–3	54
Carter Verhaeghe	81	20	33	53	–14	46
Sam Bennett	76	25	26	51	–15	90
Anton Lundell	79	17	28	45	17	36
Aaron Ekblad	56	3	30	33	11	53
Evan Rodrigues	82	15	17	32	–4	38
Mackie Samoskevich	72	15	16	31	–4	12
Gustav Forsling	80	11	20	31	33	16
Eetu Luostarinen	80	9	15	24	12	28
Jesper Boqvist	78	12	11	23	–4	14
Niko Mikkola	76	6	16	22	12	70
Nate Schmidt	80	5	14	19	4	30
Uvis Balinskis	76	4	14	18	–7	27
A.J. Greer	81	6	11	17	4	130
Dmitry Kulikov	70	4	9	13	12	38
Seth Jones^{†}	21	2	7	9	–6	4
Tomas Nosek	59	1	8	9	4	10
Adam Boqvist^{‡}	18	2	4	6	–4	6
Jonah Gadjovich	42	4	0	4	–7	60
Brad Marchand^{†}	10	2	2	4	1	2
Jesse Puljujarvi^{†}	5	1	0	1	0	15
Justin Sourdif	1	1	0	1	1	0
Nico Sturm^{†}	15	0	1	1	–2	7
Matt Kiersted	2	0	1	1	1	2
Jaycob Megna	8	0	0	0	–2	2
Rasmus Asplund	6	0	0	0	–2	2
Patrick Giles^{‡}	9	0	0	0	–1	0
Tobias Bjornfot	14	0	0	0	–3	2

Playoffs
Player	GP	G	A	Pts	+/−	PIM
Sam Reinhart	21	11	12	23	5	6
Matthew Tkachuk	23	8	15	23	7	33
Carter Verhaeghe	23	7	16	23	12	6
Sam Bennett	23	15	7	22	5	48
Aleksander Barkov	23	6	16	22	4	4
Brad Marchand	23	10	10	20	17	48
Eetu Luostarinen	23	5	14	19	11	25
Anton Lundell	23	6	12	18	19	14
Evan Rodrigues	21	2	13	15	3	10
Aaron Ekblad	19	4	9	13	10	38
Nate Schmidt	23	3	9	12	9	4
Seth Jones	23	4	5	9	11	10
Niko Mikkola	22	3	3	6	5	37
Dmitry Kulikov	23	2	3	5	6	14
Jesper Boqvist	13	2	3	5	1	0
Gustav Forsling	23	1	4	5	13	8
A.J. Greer	16	2	1	3	–2	22
Jonah Gadjovich	16	2	1	3	3	33
Tomas Nosek	16	0	3	3	4	4
Uvis Balinskis	5	1	0	1	4	2
Mackie Samoskevich	4	0	1	1	0	4
Nico Sturm	8	0	0	0	–3	0

=== Goaltenders ===
Regular season
Player	GP	GS	TOI	W	L	OT	GA	GAA	SA	SV%	SO	G	A	PIM
Sergei Bobrovsky	54	54	3,199:59	33	19	2	130	2.44	1,247	.906	5	0	1	4
Spencer Knight^{‡}	23	21	0:00	12	8	1	52	2.40	508	.907	2	0	2	0
Vitek Vanecek^{†}	7	7	420:39	2	4	1	21	3.00	191	.890	1	0	0	0

Playoffs
Player	GP	GS	TOI	W	L	GA	GAA	SA	SV%	SO	G	A	PIM
Sergei Bobrovsky	23	23	1,442:34	16	7	53	2.20	618	.914	3	0	0	0

- ^{†}Denotes player spent time with another team before joining the Panthers. Stats reflect time with the Panthers only.
- ^{‡}Denotes player was traded mid-season. Stats reflect time with the Panthers only.
- Bold/italics denotes franchise record.

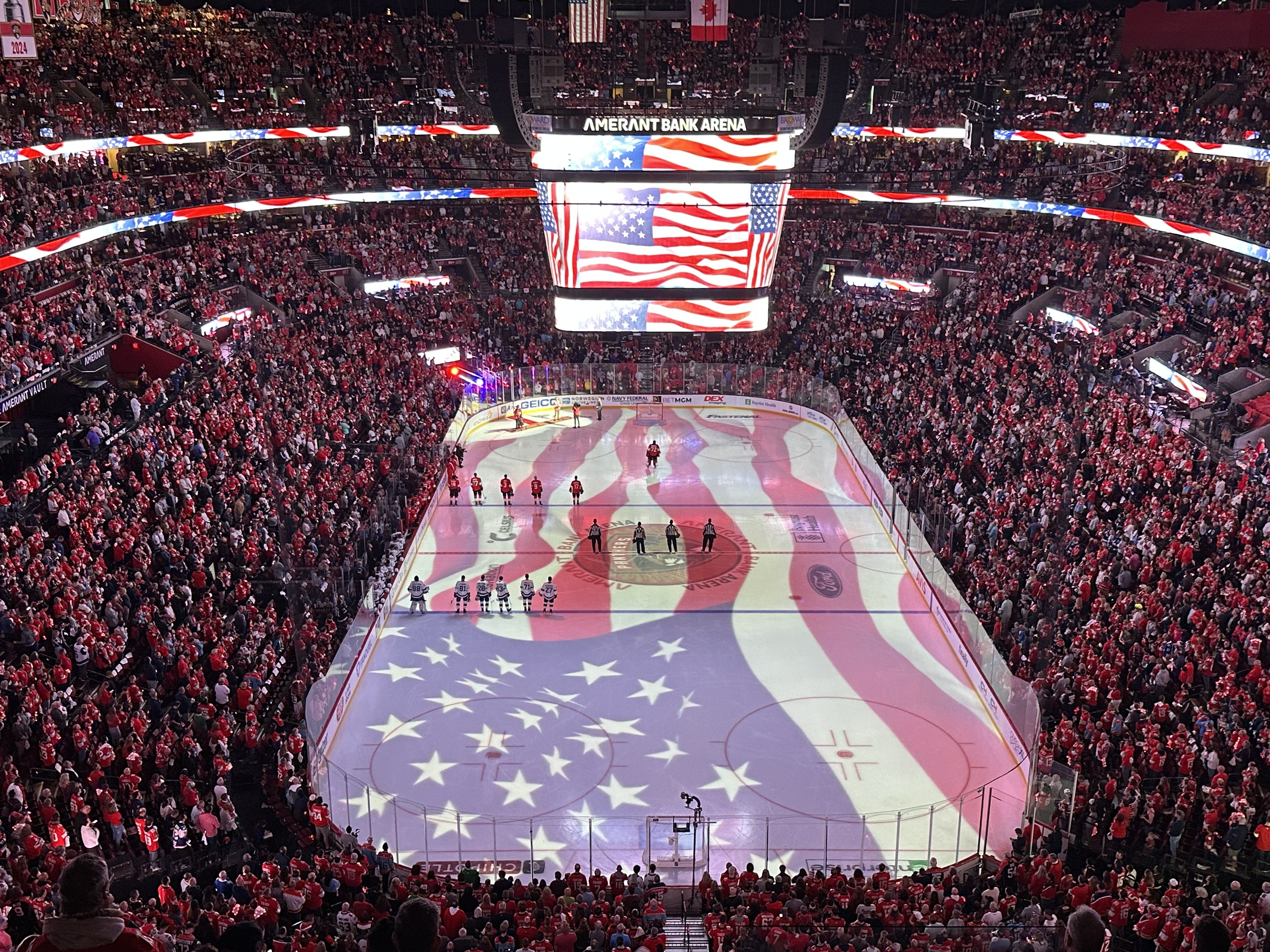
Amerant Bank Arena during a Stanley Cup Playoffs game between the Panthers and Lightning

== Awards and honors ==
=== Milestones ===
Sam Reinhart was named 1st Star of the Week for the week ending Oct. 20 with 4G–5A–9P in 4GP.

== Transactions ==
The Panthers have been involved in the following transactions during the 2024–25 season.

Key:

† Contract is entry-level.

‡ Contract initially takes effect in the 2025–26 season.

=== Trades ===
Date	Details		Ref
June 29, 2024	To Seattle Kraken PHI 5th-round pick in 2024 (#141 overall)	To Florida Panthers 6th-round pick in 2024 (#169 overall); 7th-round pick in 2024 (#207 overall)	
March 1, 2025	To Chicago Blackhawks Spencer Knight; 1st-round pick in 2026	To Florida Panthers Seth Jones; 4th-round pick in 2026	
March 5, 2025	To San Jose Sharks Patrick Giles	To Florida Panthers Vitek Vanecek	
March 6, 2025	To San Jose Sharks 4th-round pick in 2026	To Florida Panthers Nico Sturm; 7th-round pick in 2027	
March 6, 2025	To Winnipeg Jets Chris Driedger	To Florida Panthers Kaapo Kahkonen	
March 7, 2025	To Boston Bruins Conditional 2nd-round pick in 2027	To Florida Panthers Brad Marchand	

=== Players acquired ===
Date	Player	Former team	Term	Via	Ref
July 1, 2024	Jesper Boqvist	Boston Bruins	1-year	Free agency	
July 1, 2024	Chris Driedger	Seattle Kraken	1-year	Free agency	
July 1, 2024	A. J. Greer	Boston Bruins	2-year	Free agency	
July 1, 2024	Tomas Nosek	New Jersey Devils	1-year	Free agency	
July 2, 2024	MacKenzie Entwistle	Chicago Blackhawks	1-year	Free agency	
July 2, 2024	Nate Schmidt	Winnipeg Jets	1-year	Free agency	
July 5, 2024	Jaycob Megna	Chicago Blackhawks	1-year	Free agency	
July 9, 2024	Adam Boqvist	Columbus Blue Jackets	1-year	Free agency	

=== Players lost ===
Date	Player	New team	Term	Via	Ref
July 1, 2024	Oliver Ekman-Larsson	Toronto Maple Leafs	4-year	Free agency	
July 1, 2024	Ryan Lomberg	Calgary Flames	2-year	Free agency	
July 1, 2024	Brandon Montour	Seattle Kraken	7-year	Free agency	
July 1, 2024	Kevin Stenlund	Utah Hockey Club	2-year	Free agency	
July 1, 2024	Anthony Stolarz	Toronto Maple Leafs	2-year	Free agency	
July 3, 2024	Vladimir Tarasenko	Detroit Red Wings	2-year	Free agency	
August 29, 2024	Nick Cousins	Ottawa Senators	1-year	Free agency	
September 3, 2024	Steven Lorentz	Toronto Maple Leafs	1-year	Free agency	
September 19, 2024	Kyle Okposo			Retirement	
January 31, 2025	Adam Boqvist	New York Islanders		Waivers	

=== Signings ===
Date	Player	Term	Ref
June 28, 2024	Patrick Giles	2-year	
June 28, 2024	Matt Kiersted	1-year	
June 30, 2024	Sam Reinhart	8-year	
July 1, 2024	Rasmus Asplund	1-year	
July 1, 2024	Dmitry Kulikov	4-year	
July 3, 2024	Anton Lundell	6-year	
October 8, 2024	Carter Verhaeghe	8-year‡	
October 25, 2024	Hunter St. Martin	3-year†	
November 4, 2024	Gracyn Sawchyn	3-year†	
March 4, 2025	Jesper Boqvist	2-year‡	
March 5, 2025	Jesse Puljujarvi	1-year	
March 6, 2025	Evan Cormier	1-year	
April 12, 2025	Jack Devine	3-year†‡	
May 6, 2025	Ludvig Jansson	3-year†‡	
June 27, 2025	Sam Bennett	8-year‡	

== Draft picks ==
Below are the Florida Panther's selections at the 2024 NHL entry draft, which was held on June 28 and 29, 2024, at the Sphere in Las Vegas, Nevada.

Round	#	Player	Pos	Nationality	College/Junior/Club team (League)
2	58	Linus Eriksson	C	Sweden	Djurgårdens IF (HockeyAllsvenskan)
3	97	Matvei Shuravin	D	Russia	Krasnaya Armiya (MHL)
4	129	Simon Zether	C	Sweden	Rögle BK (SHL)
6	169 (Note: The Seattle Kraken's sixth-round pick went to the Florida Panthers as the result of a trade on June 29, 2024, that sent Philadelphia's fifth-round pick in 2024 (141st overall) to Seattle in exchange for a seventh-round pick both in 2024 (201st overall) and this pick.)	Stepan Gorbunov	C	Russia	Belye Medvedi Chelyabinsk (MHL)
6	193	Hunter St. Martin	LW	Canada	Medicine Hat Tigers (WHL)
7	201	Denis Gabdrakhmanov	G	Russia	Tyumensky Legion (MHL)
