= WHKY =

WHKY may refer to:

- WHKY (AM), a radio station (1290 AM) licensed to Hickory, North Carolina, United States
- WHKY-FM, a radio station (102.9 FM) licensed to Hickory, North Carolina, United States, now called WLKO
- WWJS, a television station (channel 14, virtual 14) licensed to Hickory, North Carolina, United States, which used the WHKY-TV call sign from 1968 to 2023
