= The End of Summer Weenie Roast =

Alternative rock festival

- Genre: Alternative rock
- Dates: September 16th (2012), September 28th (2013), September 6th (2014), September 12th (2015)
- Locations: PNC Music Pavilion in Charlotte, North Carolina, United States
- Years active: 2012–present
- Founders: WEND
- Website: 1065.com

The End of Summer Weenie Roast is an alternative rock festival annually in Charlotte, North Carolina, United States, at the PNC Music Pavilion. The festival was founded by the local modern alternative rock radio station, WEND. It happens some time in September to celebrate the end of summer.

== 2015 Lineup ==
- Stone Temple Pilots ft. Chester Bennington
- Passion Pit
- Bleachers
- Atlas Genius
- Live
- Mutemath
- Blues Traveler
- X Ambassadors
- Catfish and the Bottlemen
- IAMDYNAMITE
- Langhorne Slim and The Law
- Kopecky
- DJ Skratch 'N Sniff

== 2014 Lineup ==
- Weezer
- Foster The People
- Fitz and the Tantrums
- J Roddy Walston and the Business
- Fuel
- Foxy Shazam
- Wild Cub
- Bear Hands
- The Pretty Reckless
- Big Data
- Sir Sly
- Flagship
- IAMDYNAMITE
- DJ Skratch 'N Sniff

== 2013 Lineup ==
- Thirty Seconds to Mars
- Sublime with Rome
- Awolnation
- Sick Puppies
- Filter
- The Airborne Toxic Event
- New Politics
- Manchester Orchestra
- Biffy Clyro
- Langhorne Slim and The Law
- Matrimony
- The Unlikely Candidates
- Leogun
- DJ Skratch 'N Sniff
- Beyond The Broken

== 2012 Lineup ==
- The Offspring
- Garbage
- Flogging Molly
- Coheed and Cambria
- Switchfoot
- Our Lady Peace
- Anberlin
- Eve 6
- Paper Tongues
- Evans Blue
- Foxy Shazam
- Vess
- DJ Skratch 'N Sniff

== 2002 Lineup ==
- Nickelback
- Filter
- Default
- Our Lady Peace
- SR-71
- Doves
- Andrew WK
- Butch Walker
- Goldfinger
- Berlin
- Greenwheel
- Epidemic
