= Patrick Giles =

Patrick or Pat Giles may refer to:

- Patrick Giles (ice hockey) (born 2000), American ice hockey player
- Patrick Giles (politician) (1899–1965), Irish Fine Gael politician

== See also ==
- Patricia Giles, Australian politician and activist for women's rights
