= WRFX =

Classic rock radio station in Kannapolis–Charlotte, North Carolina

- Kannapolis, North Carolina; United States
- Broadcast area: Charlotte and Metrolina
- Frequency: 99.7 MHz (HD Radio)
- Branding: 99.7 The Fox

Programming
- Format: Classic rock
- Subchannels: HD2: Black-oriented news (Black Information Network)
- Affiliations: Premiere Networks

Ownership
- Owner: iHeartMedia, Inc.; (iHM Licenses, LLC)
- Sister stations: W254AZ; WEND; WHQC; WKKT; WLKO

History
- First air date: September 1964
- Former call signs: WRKB-FM (1964–1982); WJZR (1982–1986); WRFX (1986–1994); WRFX-FM (1994–1995); WRFX (1995–2002); WRFX-FM (2002–2008)
- Call sign meaning: "Fox"

Technical information
- Licensing authority: FCC
- Facility ID: 53970
- Class: C1
- ERP: 100,000 watts
- HAAT: 321 meters (1,053 ft)
- Transmitter coordinates: 35.2873°N 80.6960°W
- Translator: HD2: 98.7 W254AZ (Belmont)

Links
- Public license information: Public file; LMS
- Webcast: Listen live (via iHeartRadio)
- Website: 997thefox.iheart.com

WRFX (99.7 FM) is a commercial radio station licensed to Kannapolis, North Carolina and serving the Charlotte metropolitan area. Owned by iHeartMedia, it airs a classic rock radio format, and calls itself "99.7 The Fox." The radio studios and offices are on Woodridge Center Drive in South Charlotte. From 1986 to 2024, WRFX was the flagship station for the John Boy and Billy Big Show, a nationally syndicated morning show heard around the country.

WRFX has an effective radiated power (ERP) of 100,000 watts. The transmitter is off Caldwell Road in Charlotte. WRFX broadcasts using HD Radio technology; its digital subchannel carries the all news Black Information Network, which feeds FM translator W254AZ (98.7 MHz) in Belmont.

== History ==
=== WRKB-FM ===
In September 1964, the station signed on as WRKB-FM, in Kannapolis, North Carolina. The station was owned by former WGTL chief engineer and radio/TV repair shop owner Foy T. Hinson, who also served as general manager and chief engineer.

Initially licensed with 3,000 watts on a 150-foot (46 m) tower, the station covered most of Cabarrus County, North Carolina, and Rowan County, North Carolina, but little beyond. WRKB-FM was co-owned with WRKB (1460 AM), and simulcast the AM station's daytime-only operation, only separating from the AM station to carry high school sports in the evenings.

WRKB-FM's first studios were located at 101 West 1st Street in Kannapolis, on the second floor of a Jewelry Shop in a building owned by Cannon Mills. In 1967, the station built a 320-foot (98 m) tower and increased the FM power to 10,000 watts. The early format was easy listening and was programmed by Bob Lee. With the additional power and tower height, the station could be heard from Charlotte in the south to Lexington in the north.

=== Bill Hefner ===
On weekdays from 3 to 5 p.m., the station played Top 40 music, on a program called "Tunes For Teens". Early in 1969, Foy T. Hinson died from lung cancer, and his wife, Gertrude Hinson began to manage the station. Her management tenure was short-lived, and in 1971 the WRKB stations were sold to Southern Gospel singer Bill Hefner who partnered with Cabarrus County judge Robert L. Warren.

Upon taking control of the stations, the operating hours of WRKB-FM were extended to 1 a.m. nightly and the stations launched a full-time country music format. Popular disc jockeys during this time were Randy Whitley, Kip Yates, Tracey Hudson, David Roberts, George Berry and Randy Turner, the latter of whom would return to the station 15 years later as Animal R. O'Boogie.

In 1972, the nighttime programming of WRKB-FM was changed to southern gospel music. Popular disc jockeys in this format included John Stiles, Jeannette Kenley and Sammy Oxendine.

On July 12, 1976, the stations relocated to a studio/transmitter complex at 910 Fairview Street in Kannapolis, and WRKB-FM began broadcasting in stereo. Less than a month later, the programming of the AM station was separated from that of the FM station. About a year later, the religious organization, The PTL Club, brokered the overnight hours on WRKB-FM, to make it a 24-hour operation.

=== AC and Top 40 ===
On May 15, 1982, the station began an adult contemporary format aimed at gaining new listeners in Charlotte. One month later, the station changed the call letters to WJZR. Downs Radio, Incorporated bought WJZR-FM in June 1983.

New owner/general manager Paul Downs extensively improved the station technically, and built out the station's existing construction permit for a power increase to 50,000 watts, significantly improving its coverage in Charlotte. Simultaneously with the August 1983 power increase, the format flipped from adult contemporary to Top 40. The station was then branded as "Z-100".

=== Album rock to classic rock ===
In late 1985, the WJZR transmitter moved to a 1,000-foot (300 m) tower near Enochville, North Carolina, in Rowan County, and the power increased to the legal maximum 100,000 watts. The station made the change to album-oriented rock as WRFX, "99.7 The Fox", in 1986. Later that year, John Boy and Billy were hired as morning hosts. The show began airing nationally in 1993 out of WRFX's studios.

Over the years, the station's music has moved more in a classic rock direction. In 1996, the WRFX transmitter site moved again, this time to co-locate with WTVI's facilities in Charlotte.

After 38 years, WRFX dropped John Boy and Billy on November 15, 2024; the show continued in syndication on iHeart's Premier Networks until its end on December 31, 2025.

In 2026, as part of the station, along with many iHeartMedia-owned classic rock stations adding more 1990s and 2000s rock into their playlist and evolving their format to more of a mainstream rock-like format, WRFX changed its positioning from "Charlotte’s Classic Rock" to "Charlotte’s Rock Of The 70s, 80s, and 90s".

=== Sports broadcasts ===
In 2000, WRFX became the flagship station of the NFL's Carolina Panthers. That agreement ended after the 2004 season, when the Panthers went back to WBT, their flagship prior to 2000. It picked up sports programming again from 2008 to 2011, simulcasting North Carolina Tar Heels basketball with formerly co-owned Sports radio station WFNZ to compensate for the latter's limited nighttime signal.

In 2011, WRFX joined the Performance Racing Network to carry NASCAR Sprint Cup Series races.

The station became the flagship of the Carolina Panthers Radio Network once again starting with the 2022 season.

== HD2 channel ==
In August 2014, FM translator W254AZ 98.7 MHz began broadcasting a sports talk format from WRFX's digital subchannel. This station was a network affiliate of Fox Sports Radio, and was also heard on iHeartRadio. Jeff Kent was program director. The programming included Andy Furman and Mike North in the morning drive, Dan Patrick in the late morning and Steve Gorman in the afternoon.

On August 1, 2016, Martz Media Inc. began leasing the HD channel and translator, and flipped it to Spanish CHR as "Ke Buena 98.7".

At 8:00 p.m. on October 31, 2017, iHeartMedia re-assumed control of the HD2 channel and translator, and flipped the Spanish CHR format to an all-Christmas music format as "Christmas 98.7." On December 29, 2017, the station flipped to contemporary Christian as "UP! 98.7". "Christmas 98.7" would return to W254AZ/WRFX-HD2 at the start of November for the 2018 and 2019 holiday seasons, with "UP! 98.7" returning after Christmas.

On June 29, 2020, fifteen iHeart stations in markets with large African American populations, including W254AZ/WRFX-HD2, began stunting with African American speeches, interspersed with messages such as "Our Voices Will Be Heard" and "Our side of the story is about to be told," with a new format slated to launch on June 30. That day, W254AZ/WRFX-HD2, along with the other fourteen stations, became the launch stations for the Black Information Network, an African American-oriented all-news network.

=== W254AZ ===
WRFX-HD2 W254AZ
- Belmont, North Carolina; United States
- Broadcast area: Charlotte, North Carolina
- Frequency: 98.7 MHz (HD Radio via WRFX-HD2)
- Branding: Charlotte's BIN 98.7

Programming
- Format: Black-oriented news
- Network: Black Information Network

Ownership
- Owner: iHeartMedia; (iHM Licenses, LLC)
- Sister stations: WEND; WHQC; WKKT; WLKO

History
- First air date: August 2014

Technical information
- Licensing authority: FCC
- Facility ID: 140562
- Class: D
- ERP: 180 watts
- HAAT: 140 meters (460 ft)
- Transmitter coordinates: 35.1928°N 80.8870°W

Links
- Public license information: W254AZ Public file; LMS
- Webcast: Listen live (via iHeartRadio)
- Website: charlotte.binnews.com

W254AZ (98.7 FM) is an FM translator station licensed to serve Belmont, North Carolina.

==== History ====
In August 2014, W254AZ began broadcasting a sports talk format from WRFX's HD-2 channel. This station was an affiliate of Fox Sports Radio, and was also heard on iHeartRadio. Jeff Kent was program director. The programming included Andy Furman and Mike North in the morning drive, Dan Patrick in the late morning and Steve Gorman in the afternoon.

On August 1, 2016, Martz Media Inc. began leasing the HD channel and translator, and flipped it to Spanish CHR as "Ke Buena 98.7".

At 8:00 p.m. on October 31, 2017, iHeartMedia re-assumed control of the HD2 channel and translator, and replaced the Spanish CHR format with an all-Christmas music format, "Christmas 98.7." On December 29, 2017, the station flipped to contemporary Christian as "UP! 98.7". "Christmas 98.7" would return to the station at the start of November for the 2018 and 2019 holiday seasons, with "UP! 98.7" returning after Christmas.

On June 29, 2020, 15 iHeart stations in markets with large African American populations, including W254AZ/WRFX-HD2, began stunting with African American speeches, interspersed with messages such as "Our Voices Will Be Heard" and "Our side of the story is about to be told," with a new format slated to launch on June 30. That day, W254AZ/WRFX-HD2, along with the other 14 stations, became the launch stations for the Black Information Network, an African American-oriented all-news network.
