= WEND =

- Salisbury, North Carolina; United States
- Broadcast area: Charlotte metropolitan area - Piedmont Triad (partial)
- Frequency: 106.5 MHz (HD Radio)
- Branding: 106.5 The End

Programming
- Format: Alternative Rock
- Affiliations: Compass Media Networks; Premiere Networks; Motor Racing Network; Performance Racing Network

Ownership
- Owner: iHeartMedia; (iHM Licenses, LLC)
- Sister stations: WHQC, WKKT, WLKO, WRFX, W254AZ

History
- First air date: March 16, 1946
- Former call signs: WSTP-FM (1946–1970); WRDX (1970–1995)
- Call sign meaning: "The End"

Technical information
- Licensing authority: FCC
- Facility ID: 74074
- Class: C1
- ERP: 84,000 watts
- HAAT: 319 meters (1,047 ft)
- Transmitter coordinates: 35°35′32.00″N 80°37′44.00″W

Links
- Public license information: Public file; LMS
- Webcast: Listen live (via iHeartRadio)
- Website: 1065.iheart.com

WEND (106.5 FM), branded "106.5 The End", is a commercial radio station licensed to Salisbury, North Carolina, primarily serving the Charlotte metropolitan area, as well as parts of the Piedmont Triad. It airs an alternative rock format and is owned by iHeartMedia, Inc. The studios are on South Tryon Street in Charlotte. In morning drive time, WEND airs The Woody & Wilcox Show, with Chris Rozak in afternoons. On weekends, the nationally syndicated Skratch 'N Sniff program is heard.

WEND has an effective radiated power (ERP) of 84,000 watts. The transmitter is off Brown Road at Lipe Road in Landis. The station broadcasts using HD Radio technology and is available online via iHeartRadio.

== History ==
=== WSTP-FM and WRDX ===
The station signed on the air on March 16, 1946. The original call sign was WSTP-FM, simulcasting its sister station WSTP 1490 AM. The stations were owned by the Piedmont Broadcasting Corporation with studios in the State Theater Building. Both were network affiliates of the Mutual Broadcasting System (MBS).

The simulcast ended in 1970 and the call letters were changed to WRDX. It was still co-owned with WSTP, broadcasting a country music sound. Pat Heiss was the morning host.

Doug Rice (later with Speedway Motorsports) joined WSTP and WRDX in 1977, working a variety of on-air jobs and eventually becoming morning host and program director. In addition, he served as play-by-play announcer for Catawba College football for nearly a decade, and color analyst for Catawba basketball. He also called the Rowan County high school football game of the week on WRDX.

=== Power boost ===
WRDX had been powered at 15,000 watts, broadcasting from a tower at only 250 feet. It was mostly heard in and around Salisbury. The station got a signal and tower height increase from the FCC in 1987 that allowed WRDX to cover both Charlotte and part of the Triad, including Winston-Salem and High Point. At that time the station switched to satellite-delivered adult contemporary music. Late in the 1980s, the station began playing more oldies, especially from the category of Carolinas Beach Music.

The Dalton Group, owner of WWMG in Charlotte, bought WRDX and WSTP for $3 million in 1995. It began operating the stations under a local marketing agreement (LMA).

=== Alternative Rock ===
In May, WRDX changed its call letters to WEND. With the switch, it adopted its current alternative rock format. Its core artists included U2, The Red Hot Chili Peppers, Pearl Jam and Nirvana. With its new ownership, it moved its studios to Charlotte. This triggered several letters of protest in the Salisbury Post.

In its early years as a modern rock station, WEND carried the syndicated Bob and Tom Show from Indianapolis. This lasted until March 31, 2010.

Woody & Wilcox, from KBFX in Anchorage, Alaska, moved their morning show to Charlotte on April 19, 2010. (They also continued to air on KBFX.) The new wake-up show proved to be popular. The audience for mornings jumped 74 percent. On February 24, 2014, co-owned WVBZ in Greensboro, North Carolina, became the first station other than WEND and KBFX to add the team. During 2014, Woody & Wilcox added three other affiliates: KKZX in Spokane, Washington; KKED in Fairbanks, Alaska; and KPAW in Fort Collins, Colorado.

WEND aired weekend specialty shows Resurrection Sunday and 90 Minutes starting in 1995. These have since ended. 90 Minutes was hosted by Divakar & featured local and independent artists. Resurrection Sunday featured the roots of alternative rock & was hosted by "The Wizard". WEND airs Skratch 'N Sniff, a music program syndicated via Compass Media Networks, on Saturday nights, as well as Out of Order hosted by Stryker on Sunday nights.

=== Change in ownership ===
In 2001, WEND was acquired by Capstar. That company was later merged into San Antonio-based Clear Channel Communications. Clear Channel changed its name to iHeartMedia in 2014.

In October 2015, iHeartMedia announced that it had acquired local rights to the Motor Racing Network and Performance Racing Network's coverage of the NASCAR Sprint Cup Series. Those races began airing on WEND. Representatives of the two networks were positive over the new deal, as WEND provides better over-the-air coverage of North Carolina than previous rightsholder, 107.1 WRHM. Also, since North Wilkesboro Speedway returned to NASCAR Cup Series racing in 2023, WEND is also the default affiliate for that speedway.

In August 2017, Chuck "DZL" Thompson replaced Jack Daniel at WEND, becoming that station's second program director in 22 years. In October of 2021, Chris Crowley was hired as the program director. Crowley departed in February 2025.

== Signal ==
WEND's transmitter is found further north than most of the other major Charlotte stations. This is because it is located as close as it can legally get to Charlotte while remaining close enough to its city of license of Salisbury to provide a city-grade signal. Additionally, it is short-spaced to WTCB in Columbia at nearby 106.7.

Because of these limitations, WEND only provides a grade B signal to Rock Hill and most of the South Carolina portion of the Charlotte market. At the same time, it provides at least secondary coverage to much of the Piedmont Triad. It has city-grade coverage as far north as Winston-Salem and High Point.
