= WEZG-LP =

- Statesville, North Carolina; United States
- Frequency: 102.5 kHz
- Branding: Z102.5

Programming
- Format: Oldies/classic hits

Ownership
- Owner: Covenant Broadcasting Company of Statesville, Inc.
- Sister stations: WAME

History
- First air date: February 21, 2017
- Former call signs: WWRO-LP (2014–2019)

Technical information
- Licensing authority: FCC
- Facility ID: 194240
- Class: L1
- ERP: 27 watts
- HAAT: 49 metres (161 ft)
- Transmitter coordinates: 35°47′36″N 80°51′14″W

Links
- Public license information: LMS
- Webcast: Listen Live
- Website: z1025fm.org

WEZG-LP (102.5 FM) is a radio station licensed to serve the community of Statesville, North Carolina. The station is owned by Covenant Broadcasting Company of Statesville, Inc. It airs an oldies and classic hits format.

The station was assigned the call sign WWRO-LP by the Federal Communications Commission on May 15, 2014. It changed its call sign to WEZG-LP on July 5, 2019
