= WHQC =

- Shelby, North Carolina; United States
- Broadcast area: Charlotte/Metrolina
- Frequency: 96.1 MHz (HD Radio)
- Branding: Hits 96.1

Programming
- Format: Contemporary hit radio
- Subchannels: HD2: Radio Nueva Vida; HD3: HIS Radio
- Affiliations: Premiere Networks

Ownership
- Owner: iHeartMedia, Inc.; (iHM Licenses, LLC)
- Sister stations: WEND, WKKT, WLKO, WRFX, W254AZ

History
- First air date: 1948
- Former call signs: WOHS-FM (1948–1978); WXIK (1978–1987); WWMG (1987–2004); WIBT (2004–2011)
- Call sign meaning: "Hits Queen City"

Technical information
- Licensing authority: FCC
- Facility ID: 74194
- Class: C
- ERP: 100,000 watts
- HAAT: 533 meters (1,749 ft)
- Transmitter coordinates: 35°21′44.5″N 81°9′18.3″W
- Translators: HD2: 98.3 W252DI (Concord); HD2: 100.3 W262BM (Charlotte); HD3: 96.5 W243BY (Charlotte); HD3: 98.3 W252BU (Dallas)

Links
- Public license information: Public file; LMS
- Webcast: Listen live (via iHeartRadio)
- Website: hits961.iheart.com

WHQC (96.1 FM, "Hits 96.1") is a commercial radio station licensed to Shelby, North Carolina, United States, and serving the Charlotte metropolitan area. It broadcasts a contemporary hit radio format, and is owned by iHeartMedia with studios in the Wood Ridge Center office complex off Billy Graham Parkway in south Charlotte.

WHQC broadcasts in HD Radio; the HD2 subchannel carries Spanish language Christian radio programming from "Radio Nueva Vida" on FM translator W262BM at 100.3 FM, and the HD3 subchannel airs a contemporary Christian format called "HIS Radio", on FM translator W243BY at 96.5 FM.

== History ==
=== WOHS-FM and WXIK ===
The station signed on the air in 1948. The original call sign was WOHS-FM, the sister station to WOHS 730 AM (now WZGV). Because WOHS was a daytimer, required to go off the air at sunset, WOHS-FM was able to continue broadcasting into the evening. At first, WOGH-FM was only powered at 2,600 watts, a fraction of its current output, and was only heard within about 20 miles (32 km) of Shelby.

In 1978, the station increased its signal power. The boost allowed it to cover most of the lucrative Charlotte radio market. It became WXIK. The station began playing a Top 40 format as "K-96" that was heavy on "deep cut" rock hits. Air staff at WXIK included longtime PD/MD Jeffrey Owens, Andy Foster, Vince Goolio, J. Worthington Smith, Eddie Bridges, Dawne Conrad, Don Richards, Rusty Price, Kent Dorsey, Scott Miller, Jeff Champion, and Bob Davis.

=== WWMG ===
On February 27, 1987, the station boosted its signal to a full 100,000 watts, allowing it to cover the entire Charlotte area, including its farthest suburbs. At the same time, the station adopted a gold-based adult contemporary format under new call letters WWMG and the "Magic 96" branding. By the spring of 1989, the station flipped to oldies.

As WWMG, the station was Charlotte's radio home of the North Carolina Tar Heels from 1991 to 1995. The oldies format remained successful for nearly two decades but in the early 2000s, the station saw a drop in its ratings.

=== WIBT ===
At midnight on September 1, 2004, after playing "American Pie" by Don McLean, WWMG began stunting with a wide range of music featuring the word "kiss" in the titles. At 3 pm the following day, WWMG flipped to rhythmic contemporary, branded as "96.1 The Beat". The WIBT call letters were chosen shortly afterwards, even though it created confusion between it and Charlotte station WBT, which also has a spot on the FM dial as well.

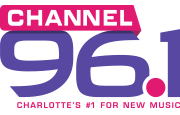
Logo as "Channel 96-1"

Despite the dispute over its call sign, WIBT became a success story when it went to #1 in the Fall 2004 Arbitron ratings. As a rhythmic contemporary formatted station, WIBT was in competition with long-time heritage urban station WPEG and mainstream contemporary station WNKS, both of whom were sister stations. Although its music tended to favor hip-hop, WIBT played pop and dance crossovers that were hits.

In early September 2010, WIBT segued into a mainstream contemporary hit radio format, going head-to-head with WNKS. It used the slogan "All The Hits". On December 10, 2010, after the station saw its ratings slip from 5.8 in Arbitron's September PPM to a 4.1 in November's PPM ratings report, WIBT rebranded as "Channel 96-1", while retaining the "All The Hits" positioner.

Christopher "Brotha Fred" Frederick's last night co-hosting Fox News Edge on WCCB was December 16, 2010. The next day, WIBT announced that Frederick, the station's morning co-host since June 2006, would begin originating the show from Chicago on January 3, 2011. Joining Frederick would be David L, who was already part of the WIBT show, and Angi Taylor of Chicago. Frederick's "AM Mayhem" would also be heard on Chicago's WKSC-FM as well as WMKS in High Point and WKXJ in Chattanooga.

=== WHQC ===
On August 31, 2011, WIBT changed its call letters to WHQC, while keeping its CHR-Top 40 format.

On December 16, 2011, the station announced that longtime Charlotte morning radio hosts Ace & TJ would be replacing Brotha Fred, beginning January 5, 2012. Ace & TJ left the station in July 2021, and returned to WNKS in July 2022 in a mid-morning timeslot.

Brooke Morrison joined the "Channel 96-1" team for afternoons on March 26, 2018, after being the producer for Nina Chantele on KRRL in Los Angeles. On January 4, 2019, WHQC rebranded as "Hits 96.1."

On-air personalities Miguel & Holly joined WHQC as the new morning drive time show in March 2022; by late 2025 they were cut due to company wide layoffs with the syndicated Fred Show from WKSC Chicago taking its place, marking the return of Brotha Fred to the station since 2011. In mid-afternoons, it also carries On Air with Ryan Seacrest, syndicated by co-owned Premiere Networks.

WHQC became Charlotte’s only CHR station on October 1, 2026 after WNKS was sold to K-Love Inc. and switched to a Christian radio format.

== Translators ==
Four translators carry programming heard on WHQC's digital subchannels, through a lease agreement. WHQC-HD2 features contemporary worship music from the "Air1" network, owned by the Educational Media Foundation (EMF). WHQC-HD3 carries "HIS Radio", playing contemporary Christian music. HIS Radio is based at WLFJ-FM in Greenville, South Carolina.

Broadcast translators for WHQC-HD2
Call sign	Frequency	City of license	FID	ERP (W)	Class	Transmitter coordinates	FCC info
W262BM	100.3 FM	Charlotte, North Carolina	29264	250	D	35°11′56.3″N 80°52′35.7″W	LMS
W252DI	98.3 FM	Concord, North Carolina	142031	250	D	35°24′3.7″N 80°37′3.1″W	LMS

Broadcast translators for WHQC-HD3
Call sign	Frequency	City of license	FID	ERP (W)	HAAT	Class	Transmitter coordinates	FCC info
W243BY	96.5 FM	Charlotte, North Carolina	148112	250	164.6 m (540 ft)	D	35°11′56.5″N 80°52′35.3″W	LMS
W252BU	98.3 FM	Dallas, North Carolina	148024	250	194.1 m (637 ft)	D	35°17′50.5″N 81°6′55.3″W	LMS
