= WAME =

- Statesville, North Carolina; United States
- Frequency: 550 kHz
- Branding: Real Country 550 & 92.9 WAME

Programming
- Format: Classic country
- Affiliations: MRN, PRN

Ownership
- Owner: Statesville Family Radio Corporation, Billy Blevins
- Sister stations: WEZG-LP

History
- First air date: 1955
- Former call signs: WDBM (1955–1980); WDRV (1980–1990); WAME (1990–1994); WHYM (1994–1996); WIST (1996–1997, 1998–2000); WTLI (1997–1998)

Technical information
- Licensing authority: FCC
- Facility ID: 63146
- Class: D
- Power: 500 watts day; 53 watts night
- Transmitter coordinates: 35°47′36″N 80°51′15″W
- Translator: 92.9 W225BD (Statesville)

Links
- Public license information: Public file; LMS
- Webcast: Listen live
- Website: wameradio.com

WAME (550 AM) is a radio station licensed to Statesville, North Carolina, United States, broadcasting a classic country format. The station is owned by William Blevins and Signal Hill Media Partners, LLC. WAME's programming can also be heard on FM on 92.9 MHz over translator W225BD, which transmits with 19 watts.

The programming is currently a mix of locally produced programming and Dial Global's Classic Hit Country format.

== History ==
=== Duke Family ===
The station on 550 AM in Statesville, North Carolina began in 1955 as WDBM, and operated only during daytime hours with licensed power of 500 watts. WDBM was founded by Walter A. Duke. In 1967, the Duke family started WDBM-FM at 96.9 FM, now known as WKKT, which initially was simulcast with WDBM. WDBM-FM continued to broadcast easy-listening music in the evenings after WDBM signed off.

=== Ferguson Family ===
In 1973, the Duke family sold the both stations to the Ferguson Family. The new owners separated the operations of the AM and FM, and the AM began broadcasting a country music format. The FM was given the calls WOOO and on-air was called "Triple-O 97".

=== Metrolina Communications ===
In 1980, both WDBM and WOOO were sold to Metrolina Communications of Orlando, Florida. WDBM became WDRV and switched to an adult contemporary format.

=== GHB Broadcasting ===
WDRV was sold to Statesville Family Communications, a subsidiary of GHB Broadcasting. The format was changed to Southern gospel music and religious teaching.

In 1990, the callsign became WAME. In 1994, the callsign changed to WHYM.

In 1996, the station became WIST with the tagline "Station of the Stars". It was an affiliate of the Music of Your Life adult standards network.

In 1997, GHB Broadcasting created a regional talk network called Total Radio to compete in the Charlotte, North Carolina market against heritage station WBT. As part that effort, the callsign changed to WTLI when it joined the Total Radio simulcast. The attempt to compete against 50,000-watt WBT was not successful.

By 1998, the WIST call letters were back to Statesville, with the Real Country format on the station, and the station became WAME again in October 2000.

In the early 2000s, long-time radio personality J. D. Benfield began doing the morning show on the station, and the remainder of the day's programming was the Stardust satellite format from ABC Radio Networks.

In February 2008, WAME became "Country Legends 550." Benfield left the station in August 2008.

On October 1, 2008, country radio personality John Glenn joined WAME as Operations Manager and Morning Show Host. "Big Country Mornings with John Glenn" began airing on Monday, January 12, 2009.

Former logo
