= WLKO =

Coordinates: 35.407°N 81.130°W

Hickory, North Carolina; United States
- Broadcast area: Charlotte metropolitan area
- Frequency: 102.9 MHz (HD Radio)
- Branding: 102.9 The Lake

Programming
- Format: Adult hits
- Subchannels: HD2: Pride Radio

Ownership
- Owner: iHeartMedia; (iHM Licenses, LLC)
- Sister stations: WEND, WHQC, WKKT, WRFX, W254AZ

History
- First air date: January 20, 1959
- Former call signs: WHKY-FM (1959–1987); WRLX (1987–1989); WEZC (1989–1995); WLYT (1995–2012)
- Call sign meaning: Lake 1O2 (The O stands for 0)

Technical information
- Licensing authority: FCC
- Facility ID: 68211
- Class: C1
- ERP: 31,000 watts
- HAAT: 468 meters (1,535 ft)

Links
- Public license information: Public file; LMS
- Webcast: Listen live (via iHeartRadio)
- Website: 1029thelake.iheart.com

WLKO (102.9 FM, "The Lake") is a commercial radio station licensed to Hickory, North Carolina, and serving the Charlotte metropolitan area. It airs an adult hits format that leans toward classic hits. It is owned by iHeartMedia, with studios in the South End neighborhood of Charlotte.

WLKO is a Class C1 station, with an effective radiated power (ERP) of 31,000 watts. The transmitter is on Omega Lane, off North Carolina Highway 27 in Iron Station. WLKO broadcasts in the HD Radio format. On its HD2 subchannel, it carries Pride Radio, iHeart's LGBTQ contemporary and dance music service.

== History ==
=== WHKY-FM ===
The station signed on the air on January 20, 1959. Its original call sign was WHKY-FM, the sister station to WHKY (1290 AM). The two stations were owned by Catawba Valley Broadcasting and mostly simulcast their programming, as network affiliates of ABC Radio. WHKY-FM was powered at 14,800 watts, a fraction of its current output. It concentrated on the Hickory area and its signal did not easily reach the larger Charlotte radio market.

WHKY-AM-FM aired mostly Christian radio programming in their early history. They primarily carried fundamentalist Baptist hymns and Southern gospel quartets such as The Blackwood Brothers and the Oak Ridge Quartet. Listeners were mostly over 55.

The FM station broke away on October 16, 1982. It began airing a Top 40 format that leaned toward album rock. Many of WKHY-FM's previous listeners protested the change with letters to the local newspaper, and a pile of letters to the station described as one foot high, 95 percent opposed. The Top 40 format targeted the 18 to 30 audience, which attracted many more advertisers.

=== WRLX and WEZC ===
On September 1, 1987, WKHY-FM got a signal boost and its tower was moved closer to Charlotte. The station could now be a player in the more lucrative Charlotte market. It switched its call sign to WRLX, becoming "Relax 102.9". It aired a beautiful music format. Relax 102.9 played a mix of soft instrumentals with occasional vocals, Broadway and Hollywood show tunes.

WRLX promoted itself with images of a pair of retirement-age punk rockers, intended to humorously illustrate how the competition apparently viewed the station's target audience. In March 1989, the station changed its call sign to WEZC (after the 104.7 frequency gave up those letters). The EZ call letters represented easy listening music. The station began calling itself "EZ 102.9", gradually adding more vocals during the summer to make the transition from beautiful music to MOR. Some of the announcers include Bob Brandon, Jim Davenport, Catherine Lane, Jon Robinson and Todd Edwards.

=== WLYT ===
In 1993, the moniker changed again to "Lite 102.9" as the station moved away from Barbra Streisand, Neil Diamond and Barry Manilow to soft adult contemporary artists such as Phil Collins, Elton John and Billy Joel. Once again, the call letters switched to WLYT in 1995. Over the years, as the definition of soft adult contemporary changed, WLYT evolved. The station played pop and lite rock music from the 1970s to present, with an occasional 1960s song. The nationally syndicated call-in and request show Delilah After Dark aired in the evenings.

WLYT featured a "70's Flashback Weekend" every weekend since late 2004 through 2005, but discontinued this tradition after the slogan changed from "Continuous Lite Favorites" to "The Best Variety of Yesterday and Today". The station played Christmas music annually, with 'preview weekends' from early November through Thanksgiving, then a 24-hour Christmas format from Thanksgiving through Christmas Day. WLYT's main competitor was CBS Radio's WKQC. WLYT had changed its slogan from The Best Variety of Yesterday and Today to The Bright New Sound of Lite 102.9 in 2011.

In late January 2008, WLYT changed its morning show. It wanted to resemble the Today show on NBC, with more talk geared toward women 25 to 54. During the first hour, the talk was more hard news, becoming lighter as the morning show progressed and adding more music during work hours. The program schedule was altered as well. The show was discontinued in early 2010 with morning hosts Jim Shafer (who had moved to the station from WWMG in 2004) and Jen Byrum (morning host since 1999) being released. On April 13, 2010, Valentine in the Morning, a syndicated show from sister station KBIG-FM in Los Angeles, made its debut. A local host was planned for local segments of the show.

=== WLKO ===
On July 2, 2012, at midnight, WLYT changed its format to adult hits, branded as "102.9 The Lake". The final song on "Lite" was "Far Away" by Nickelback, while the first song on the "Lake" was "Father of Mine" by Everclear.

Steve Geofferies, operations manager for the Charlotte cluster of station owner Clear Channel, said, "If it was a hit song, we're going to play it," explaining that the format was based on WARH in St. Louis, and more "tempo-oriented" than nearby WSMW. The name "Lake" meant "fun, unique, connecting with friends and families. That's life on the lake," specifically Lake Norman and Lake Wylie. The playlist was 4,000 songs compared to 400 for a typical station. Also, the station would not have DJs. That meant morning hosts Heather Flynn and Phil Harris were let go. On July 9, 2012, WLYT changed its call letters to WLKO to go with the "Lake" branding.

The format change delivered immediate results. While WLYT ranked 15th with 3 percent share of the total audience in its final ratings report, WLKO was ranked 7th with five percent share in its first one. After two years, WLKO was up 52 percent to 4th place for the most successful format change in the market in 25 years. The playlist primarily features hit music from the 1970s, 80s and 90s with some 2000s music played. With this, the station more closely resembles a classic hits station than the adult hits format the station started out with, though the "We Play Anything" slogan is still promoted.

On September 16, 2014, WLKO's owners Clear Channel Communications officially changed its name to iHeartMedia, Inc.
