= WHKY (AM) =

Coordinates: 35°43′35″N 81°18′02″W

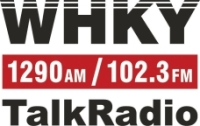

Hickory, North Carolina; United States
- Broadcast area: Charlotte metropolitan area
- Frequency: 1290 kHz
- Branding: WHKY TalkRadio

Programming
- Format: News/talk/sports
- Affiliations: Premiere Networks; Westwood One; Salem Radio Network; Fox News Radio; North Carolina News Network; Fox Sports Radio; Motor Racing Network; Performance Racing Network

Ownership
- Owner: WHKY, LLC

History
- First air date: June 10, 1940
- Call sign meaning: Hickory

Technical information
- Licensing authority: FCC
- Facility ID: 65918
- Class: B
- ERP: 50,000 watts day 1,000 watts night
- Translator: 102.3 W272DU (Hickory)
- Repeater: WHKY-TV SAP audio channel

Links
- Public license information: Public file; LMS
- Webcast: Listen Live
- Website: whky.com

WHKY (1290 kHz) is a commercial AM radio station in Hickory, North Carolina. The station is owned by WHKY, LLC, and broadcasts a news/talk/sports format. The radio studios and offices are on Main Avenue SE in Hickory.

By day, WHKY is powered at 50,000 watts, the maximum for AM stations. But to protect other stations on AM 1290, it greatly reduces power at night to 1,000 watts. It uses a directional antenna at all times. The transmitter is on Tate Boulevard SE at 20th Street SE in Hickory. Programming is also heard on FM translator W272DU at 102.3 MHz

== Programming ==
WHKY begins each weekday with an hour of local news, including the "Crime Report" sponsored by King & Rowe, Attorneys at Law. It is followed by live, local talk and information shows, "First Talk," hosted by Hal Row and "On Second Thought" talk show, hosted by Chuck Boozer. The rest of the weekday schedule comes mostly from nationally syndicated conservative talk shows: The Clay Travis & Buck Sexton Show, Sean Hannity, Mark Levin, Dave Ramsey, Fox Sports Radio and Coast to Coast AM with George Noory. Weekends feature Kim Komando, Somewhere in Time with Art Bell and repeats of weekday programs.

WHKY is also affiliated with Motor Racing Network, Performance Racing Network and the Indy Radio Network providing NASCAR racing coverage, as well as select Indy Car Series events when in season. Also, on Fridays when in season, WHKY airs Hickory High School football and girls and boys varsity basketball.

Weekdays, WHKY has local news at 15 and 45 past the hour from 6:45 to 8:45am, 12 noon, 3 and 5pm. Local sports is provided at 7:45 and 8:45am and 3 and 5pm. News at the top of each hour is provided by Fox News Radio. WHKY is also affiliated with the North Carolina News Network.

Until 2023, the station was co-owned with WHKY-TV (channel 14, now religious station WWJS). WHKY radio is simulcast via that station's second audio program, effectively bringing its reach across the Charlotte metro through that simulcast.

== History ==
On June 10, 1940, the station first signed on. During World War II, getting equipment was difficult, but Ed Long put together the WHKY transmitter with the help of a mule and plow. The station signed on in 1940, broadcasting from the Hotel Hickory. In the 1950s, it moved to the Elliott-Carnegie Library.

Tom Long, Ed Long's son, supervised the station's daytime signal boost from 5,000 to 50,000 watts in 2003, as well as the construction of a new building. Jeff Long, representing the third generation of Longs, was station manager.

In 1987, WHKY ended its music programming and went with an all talk format. WHKY aired Paul Harvey's News and Comment segments prior to his death in 2009.

WHKY was a charter station of The Rush Limbaugh Show and aired the show through his death until Premiere Networks debuted The Clay Travis and Buck Sexton Show four months after his death.
