= Charlotte Checkers =

American Hockey League team in Charlotte, North Carolina

- City: Charlotte, North Carolina
- League: American Hockey League
- Conference: Eastern
- Division: Atlantic
- Founded: 1990
- Home arena: Bojangles Coliseum
- Colors: Red, black, silver, white
- Owner: Zawyer Sports & Entertainment
- General manager: Paul Krepelka
- Head coach: Geordie Kinnear
- Captain: Vacant
- Media: WAME, AHL.TV (Internet)
- Affiliates: Florida Panthers (NHL); Savannah Ghost Pirates (ECHL)

Franchise history
- 1971–1974: Boston Braves
- 1990–1993: Capital District Islanders
- 1993–2010: Albany River Rats
- 2010–present: Charlotte Checkers

Championships
- Regular season titles: 1 (2018–19)
- Division titles: 2 (2018–19, 2021–22)
- Conference titles: 2 (2018–19, 2024–25)
- Calder Cups: 1 (2018–19)

Current uniform
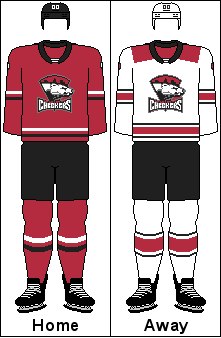

The Charlotte Checkers are a professional ice hockey team based in Charlotte, North Carolina. They are members of the Atlantic Division of the Eastern Conference in the American Hockey League (AHL), and are the top minor league affiliate of the Florida Panthers of the National Hockey League (NHL). The Checkers play their home games at Bojangles' Coliseum.

The current organization is the third team by this name; it succeeded a Checkers franchise that played in the ECHL from 1993 until the end of the 2009–10 ECHL season. The original Checkers team played in the city from 1956 to 1977, originally in the Eastern Hockey League and then in the Southern Hockey League. The franchise is one of six teams to replace and share a name with a predecessor franchise from a lower-tier league; the others are the Bakersfield Condors, Colorado Eagles, Ontario Reign, Rockford IceHogs, and San Diego Gulls.

== History ==
The franchise was previously based in the Capital District of New York and was a reestablishment of an inactive Boston Braves franchise that had been dormant since 1974. The team operated as the Capital District Islanders from 1990 to 1993 and the Albany River Rats from 1993 to 2010. The River Rats were then sold to MAK Hockey, LLC, led by Charlotte beer distributor Michael Kahn, owner of the ECHL Checkers. The new ownership relocated the team to Charlotte for the 2010–11 season, renaming the franchise the "Charlotte Checkers", and relinquished the ECHL franchise to the league.

The Checkers are the second North Carolina–based team to play at the highest level of minor-league hockey, following the Carolina Monarchs, who played in Greensboro from 1995 to 1997. The Checkers inherited the River Rats' affiliation with the Carolina Hurricanes, in keeping with a recent trend to have NHL teams' top affiliates geographically close to their parent teams in order to ease movement between the AHL and the NHL.

The AHL Checkers' first home game was October 15, 2010, at the Time Warner Cable Arena in front of 12,512 spectators, which set an attendance record for a hockey game in Charlotte. On February 26, 2011, the attendance record was broken as 12,933 fans watched the Checkers defeat the Connecticut Whale 1–0. Almost a year later, on February 25, 2012, the attendance record was broken yet again as 13,102 fans watched the Checkers fall to the Oklahoma City Barons, 3–2. On April 11, 2015, the attendance record was broken a third time as 13,219 fans watched the last Checkers game at Time Warner Cable Arena, a 2–0 loss to the Rockford IceHogs.

In late 2014, the Checkers announced they would return in the following season to the Bojangles' Coliseum, the home of the previous Checkers teams until 2005. Kahn said the move would reconnect with the legacy of past Checkers teams. Additionally, while Bojangles' Coliseum was smaller than Time Warner Cable Arena, having a dedicated arena allowed for "greater control over every aspect of our business, including scheduling, amenities, game presentation and sponsorship inventory." The Charlotte City Council provided $16 million for renovations in order to bring the Coliseum to AHL standards. While Time Warner Cable Arena had been one of the largest arenas in the AHL, it was built primarily for basketball and thus did not easily accommodate a hockey rink. It seated 14,100 people, but over 4,000 seats had obstructed views.

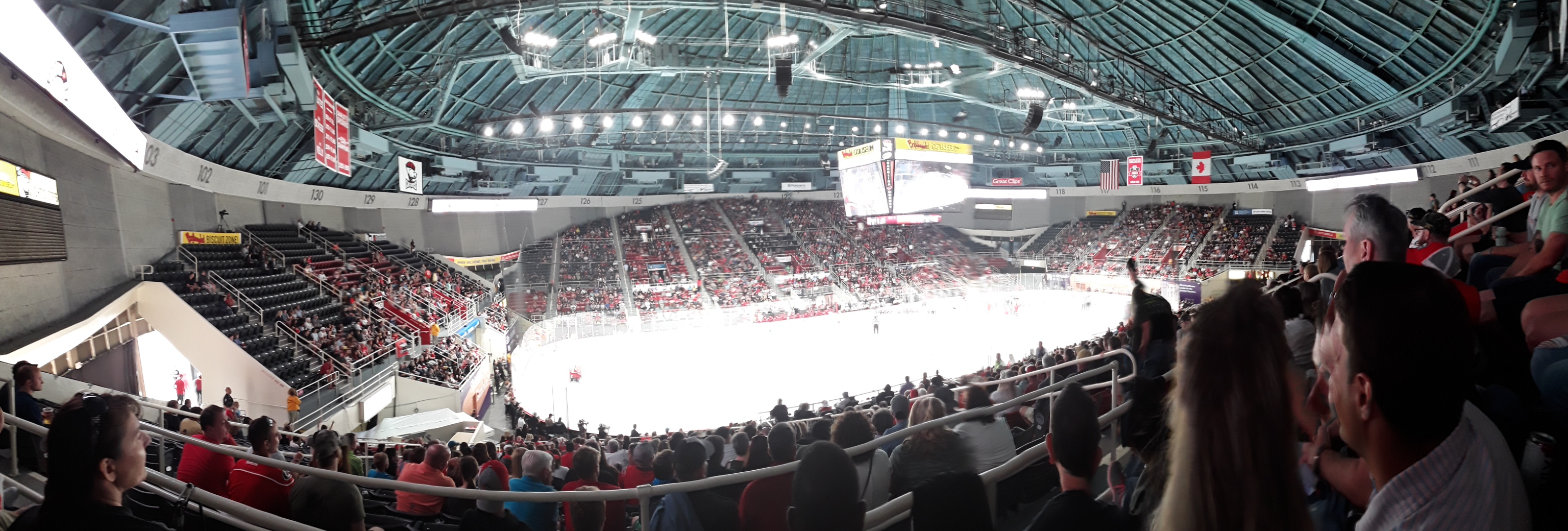
Panoramic view of Bojangles' Coliseum for Game 2 of the 2019 Calder Cup Finals, against the Chicago Wolves.

In Charlotte on May 9 and 10, 2018, in game four of the second round of the Calder Cup playoffs, the Checkers and the Lehigh Valley Phantoms played the longest game in the history of the American Hockey League. A 1–1 tie was broken by a Phantoms' goal at 6:48 of the fifth overtime period, more than six hours after the game began. The Checkers made 95 shots against Lehigh Valley goalie Alex Lyon.

The 2018–19 season was the Checkers' best season as an AHL team to date and one of the best in Charlotte's hockey history. They won their first division title with 110 points and the Macgregor Kilpatrick Trophy for the league's best regular season record. It was the first time a Charlotte hockey team had broken the 100-point barrier since the SHL Checkers earned 101 points in 1974–75. They defeated the defending champion Toronto Marlies in the Eastern Conference finals to advance to their first Calder Cup final. They defeated the Chicago Wolves in five games to win their first AHL title, and the seventh hockey championship by a Charlotte-based team.

The following 2019–20 season was curtailed by the COVID-19 pandemic and the Calder Cup was not awarded. Following the cancelled postseason, the Hurricanes ended their affiliation with the Checkers after ten seasons, resulting in the Checkers affiliating with the Florida Panthers beginning with the 2020–21 season. However, due to the ongoing restrictions during the pandemic, the Checkers were one of three teams that opted out of the 2020–21 AHL season. When the Checkers returned for the 2021–22 season, they remained the primary affiliate of the Panthers, but agreed to also serve as the affiliate for the 2021–22 expansion team Seattle Kraken. The Kraken's general manager Ron Francis formerly worked for the Hurricanes when the team was still affiliated with the Checkers.

== Season-by-season results ==
Regular season											Playoffs					
Season	Games	Won	Lost	OTL	SOL	Points	PCT	Goals for	Goals against	Standing	Year	Prelims	1st round	2nd round	3rd round	Finals
2010–11	80	44	27	2	7	97	.606	265	243	3rd, East	2011	—	W, 4–2, HER	W, 4–2, WBS	L, 0–4, BNG	—
2011–12	76	38	29	3	6	85	.559	209	214	3rd, Midwest	2012	Did not qualify				
2012–13	76	42	26	4	4	92	.605	226	202	2nd, South	2013	—	L, 2–3, OKC	—	—	—
2013–14	76	37	36	1	2	77	.507	228	241	4th, West	2014	Did not qualify				
2014–15	76	31	38	6	1	69	.454	172	231	4th, West	2015	Did not qualify				
2015–16	76	36	32	3	5	80	.526	214	229	5th, Central	2016	Did not qualify				
2016–17	76	39	29	7	1	86	.566	212	208	4th, Central	2017	—	L, 2–3, CHI	—	—	—
2017–18	76	46	26	1	3	96	.632	261	212	3rd, Atlantic	2018	—	W, 3–0, WBS	L, 1–4, LV	—	—
2018–19	76	51	17	7	1	110	.724	255	189	1st, Atlantic	2019	—	W, 3–1, PRO	W, 4–0, HER	W, 4–2, TOR	W, 4–1, CHI
2019–20	61	34	22	5	0	73	.598	202	172	3rd, Atlantic	2020	Season cancelled due to the COVID-19 pandemic				
2020–21	Did not participate due to the COVID-19 pandemic										2021	Did not participate				
2021–22	72	42	24	5	1	90	.625	234	197	1st, Atlantic	2022	BYE	W, 3–1, BRI	L, 0–3, SPR	—	—
2022–23	72	39	25	5	3	86	.597	235	220	3rd, Atlantic	2023	W, 2–1, LV	L, 1–3, HER	—	—	—
2023–24	72	39	26	7	0	85	.590	217	203	4th, Atlantic	2024	L, 1–2, HFD	—	—	—	—
2024–25	72	44	22	3	3	94	.653	234	185	2nd, Atlantic	2025	BYE	W, 3–2, PRO	W, 3–0, HER	W, 4–0, LAV	L, 2–4, ABB
2025–26	72	44	23	5	0	93	.646	238	187	3rd, Atlantic	2026	L, 1–2, SPR	—	—	—	—

== Players ==
=== Current roster ===
Updated October 10, 2026.

No.	Nat	Player	Pos	S/G	Age	Acquired	Birthplace	Contract
27	(Czech Republic)	Marek Alscher	D	L	22	2024	Kladno, Czech Republic	Panthers
17	(Canada)	Nathan Bastian	RW	R	28	2026	Kitchener, Ontario	Panthers
16	(United States)	John Beecher	C	L	25	2026	Elmira, New York	Panthers
21	(Canada)	William Bitten	RW	R	28	2026	Ottawa, Ontario	Checkers
40	(Sweden)	Tobias Bjornfot (A)	D	L	25	2024	Upplands Väsby, Sweden	Panthers
31	(United States)	Cooper Black	G	L	25	2024	Alpena, Michigan	Panthers
28	(United States)	Brett Chorske	C	R	25	2025	Edina, Minnesota	Checkers
9	(Canada)	Angus Crookshank	LW	L	27	2026	North Vancouver, British Columbia	Panthers
4	(United States)	Jack Devine	RW	R	23	2025	Glencoe, Illinois	Panthers
25	(United States)	Karsen Dorwart	LW	L	24	2026	Sherwood, Oregon	Checkers
18	(Canada)	MacKenzie Entwistle (A)	RW	R	27	2024	Georgetown, Ontario	Panthers
5	(United States)	Casey Fitzgerald (A)	D	R	29	2026	North Reading, Massachusetts	Panthers
22	(Canada)	Riese Gaber (A)	RW	R	27	2024	Gilbert Plains, Manitoba	Checkers
20	(Russia)	Kirill Gerasimyuk	G	L	23	2025	St. Petersburg, Russia	Panthers
14	(Czech Republic)	Mikulas Hovorka	D	R	25	2024	Prague, Czech Republic	Panthers
3	(Sweden)	Ludvig Jansson	D	R	22	2025	Stockholm, Sweden	Panthers
34	(Finland)	Kasper Lundell	C	L	22	2026	Espoo, Finland	Checkers
42	(Czech Republic)	Matyas Man	D	L	20	2026	Ostrava, Czech Republic	Checkers
7	(United States)	Robert Mastrosimone	LW	L	25	2025	Bay Shore, New York	Checkers
36	(Canada)	Alex Petrovic	D	R	34	2026	Edmonton, Alberta	Panthers
39	(Finland)	Emil Pieniniemi	D	L	21	2026	Kuopio, Finland	Panthers
26	(United States)	Brian Pinho	C	R	31	2025	Beverly, Massachusetts	Checkers
23	(Canada)	Cole Reinhardt	LW	L	26	2026	Calgary, Alberta	Panthers
43	(Finland)	Samu Salminen	C	L	23	2026	Helsinki, Finland	Panthers
24	(Canada)	Gracyn Sawchyn	C	R	21	2025	Grand Prairie, Alberta	Panthers
11	(Canada)	Cole Schwindt	RW	R	25	2026	Breslau, Ontario	Panthers
13	(Canada)	Kai Schwindt	LW	L	22	2023	Breslau, Ontario	Panthers
6	(Canada)	Donovan Sebrango	D	L	24	2026	Ottawa, Ontario	Panthers
2	(Russia)	Matvei Shuravin	D	L	20	2026	Moscow, Russia	Panthers
15	(United States)	Nate Smith	C	R	28	2025	Tampa, Florida	Checkers
19	(Canada)	Hunter St. Martin	LW	L	21	2025	Edmonton, Alberta	Panthers
41	(United States)	Philip Tresca	C	R	24	2026	Boston, Massachusetts	Checkers
8	(Canada)	Mitch Vande Sompel	D	L	29	2024	London, Ontario	Checkers

=== Team captains ===
- Bryan Rodney, 2010–11
- Brett Sutter, 2011–14
- Michal Jordan, 2014–15
- Derek Ryan, 2015–16
- Patrick Brown, 2016–19
- Roland McKeown, 2019–20
- Zac Dalpe, 2021–25
- Trevor Carrick, 2025–26

=== American Hockey League Hall of Famers ===
AHL Hall of Fame Honored Members
Name	Seasons	Induction Year
Michael Leighton	2016-17 (player)	2025

=== Notable alumni ===
The following players have played both 100 games for the Charlotte Checkers and 100 games in the National Hockey League:

- Rasmus Asplund
- Jake Bean
- Brett Bellemore
- Drayson Bowman
- Zach Boychuk
- Patrick Brown
- Zac Dalpe
- Phil Di Giuseppe
- Haydn Fleury
- Julien Gauthier
- Morgan Geekie
- Janne Kuokkanen
- Brock McGinn
- Riley Nash
- Alex Nedeljkovic
- Nicolas Roy
- Chris Terry
- Lucas Wallmark
