= WWJS =

Television station in Hickory, North Carolina

- Hickory–Charlotte, North Carolina; United States
- City: Hickory, North Carolina
- Channels: Digital: 14 (UHF); Virtual: 14

Programming
- Affiliations: 14.1: SonLife; for others, see § Subchannels

Ownership
- Owner: Family Worship Center Church, Inc.

History
- First air date: February 14, 1968
- Former call signs: WHKY-TV (1968–2023)
- Former channel numbers: Analog: 14 (UHF, 1968–2009); Digital: 40 (UHF, until 2019)
- Former affiliations: Independent (1968–2023)
- Call sign meaning: Jimmy Swaggart

Technical information
- Licensing authority: FCC
- Facility ID: 65919
- ERP: DTS1: 1,000 kW; DTS2: 260 kW
- HAAT: DTS1: 256 m (840 ft); DTS2: 161 m (528 ft)
- Transmitter coordinates: DTS1: 35°39′28.4″N 81°24′23.3″W; DTS2: 35°17′15″N 80°41′44″W

Links
- Public license information: Public file; LMS

WWJS (channel 14) is a religious television station licensed to Hickory, North Carolina, United States, owned and operated by the SonLife Broadcasting Network. It serves the northwestern corner of the Charlotte media market, a region locally referred to as "The Unifour". WWJS' primary transmitter is located on Bakers Mountain in southwestern Catawba County, with a secondary transmitter in the unincorporated area of Newell in northeastern Mecklenburg County (just northeast of the Charlotte city limits).

== History ==
The station first signed on the air on February 14, 1968, as WHKY-TV, a sister station to WHKY radio (1290 AM), owned by Long Communications of Hickory. During the 1980s, WHKY-TV aired Major League Baseball games from the Cincinnati Reds; it also had a secondary affiliation with NBC, carrying some programs that were preempted by the Charlotte market's primary NBC affiliate, WPCQ-TV (channel 36, now WCNC-TV).

For most of its first quarter-century on the air, WHKY-TV primarily targeted the Unifour. In 2002, WHKY-TV installed two new antennas: one for its digital signal and one which replaced its older analog antenna. The latter antenna's installation helped to increase WHKY-TV's analog signal coverage into the far northern corner of Mecklenburg County. As a result, the station was granted a must-carry claim, allowing it to be added to Time Warner Cable's systems in the Charlotte area; the station also began identifying as "Hickory–Charlotte" in its on-air legal identifications.

In 2004, WHKY-TV boosted its analog transmitter's power to 2 million watts. In June 2006, the station began to be carried on Dish Network and DirecTV's Charlotte area local station lineups, expanding its reach to cover two million people in North and South Carolina. The station's digital transmitter was relocated to Bakers Mountain in the fall of 2011, with its effective radiated power increasing to 950,000 watts (equivalent to 4.75 million watts in analog); the station also launched a fill-in translator, whose transmitter is located just north of Charlotte (near the Charlotte Motor Speedway).

On February 15, 2023, it was announced that WHKY-TV would be sold to Baton Rouge, Louisiana–based Family Worship Center Church, led by pastor Jimmy Swaggart, for $12 million. The sale was completed on April 25; the station changed its call sign to WWJS on June 7, 2023. Long Communications retained WHKY radio and its FM translator, as well as the WHKY call sign.

The deal resulted in main-channel coverage of Swaggart's Sonlife Broadcasting Network throughout the Charlotte market, which is a hub of major televangelism organizations, including Swaggart's longtime rivals, the Billy Graham Evangelistic Association and Jim Bakker's PTL, now INSP; it was previously carried as a subchannel of both WJZY and WMYT-TV before their 2020 sale to Nexstar Media Group.

== Programming ==
Prior to the sale to Sonlife, WHKY-TV's schedule consisted primarily of locally-produced religious and entertainment shows, as well as paid programming. In addition, a weekday local newscast aired twice a day at 5:30 and 10 p.m. and is known for its rundown of crime news and wanted fugitive notices within Hickory and Catawba County; it continues to stream online through the radio station's website and YouTube channel. The station featured only one syndicated show, MGM Television's Personal Injury Court.

== Technical information ==
=== Subchannels ===
The station's signal is multiplexed:

Subchannels of WWJS
Subchannel	Res.	Short name	Programming
14.1	720p	WWJSTV	SonLife
14.2	480i	WHKY	Newsmax2
14.3	480i	Comet	Comet
14.4	480i	BUSTED	Busted
14.5	480i	MOVGOLD	MovieSphere Gold
14.6	480i	RevFt	Infomercials
14.7	480i	ROAR	Roar

Previously, the second and fourth digital subchannels have been affiliated with Jewelry Television, which was shown at various times on the main channel. The network was used as a placeholder until the additions of RTV and My Family TV on those respective subchannels. On September 28, 2012, My Family TV was replaced with PBJ. In November 2012, WHKY-TV began transmitting its main channel in 720p high definition, and in 2014 the main channel began airing Jewelry Television in HD for portions of the day. On March 1, 2014, PBJ was replaced on digital subchannel 14.4 by Heartland (which originated as the broadcast incarnation of The Nashville Network in 2012). On July 1, 2014, This TV was added to the second subchannel, making WHKY the fourth station in the Charlotte market to carry it. On that same date, Retro TV was moved to the third subchannel, replacing Tuff TV. On January 5, 2021, SonLife began broadcast on subchannel 14.7, while Charge! was replaced by TBD. On July 1, 2021, Jewelry Television and Shop LC on 14.5 and 14.6 respectively were replaced with Defy TV and TrueReal.

=== Analog-to-digital conversion ===
WWJS (as WHKY-TV) shut down its analog signal, over UHF channel 14, on February 14, 2009, three days before the original date on which full-power television stations in the United States were to transition from analog to digital broadcasts under federal mandate. The station's digital signal remained on its pre-transition UHF channel 40, using virtual channel 14.
