= Matvei Shuravin =

Russian ice hockey player (born 2006)

- Born: 22 March 2006 (age 20) Moscow, Russia
- Height: 6 ft 2 in (188 cm)
- Weight: 172 lb (78 kg; 12 st 4 lb)
- Position: Defenseman
- Shoots: Left
- NHL team (P) Cur. team Former teams: Florida Panthers; Charlotte Checkers (AHL); CSKA Moscow
- NHL draft: 97th overall, 2024; Florida Panthers
- Playing career: 2023–present

Matvei Shuravin (Russian: Матвей Шуравин; born 22 March 2006) is a Russian professional ice hockey player who is currently playing for the Charlotte Checkers in the American Hockey League (AHL) while under contract as a prospect to Florida Panthers of the National Hockey League (NHL).

== Playing career ==
Shuravin, as a youth played within the junior ranks of CSKA Moscow of the Kontinental Hockey League (KHL). Known for being a mobile defenseman, earned a “A” rating in NHL Central Scouting's initial watch list. He was a considered a top prospect eligible for the 2024 NHL entry draft. He was selected in the third-round, 97th overall, by the Florida Panthers.

Following completion of his second season in the KHL with CSKA, Shuravin was signed to a three-year, entry-level contract with the Florida Panthers on 2 June 2026.

== Career statistics ==
			Regular season					Playoffs
Season	Team	League	GP	G	A	Pts	PIM	GP	G	A	Pts	PIM
2022–23	Krasnaya Armiya	MHL	27	3	2	5	8	4	0	0	0	6
2023–24	Krasnaya Armiya	MHL	22	0	7	7	26	—	—	—	—	—
2023–24	Zvezda Moscow	VHL	5	0	0	0	2	—	—	—	—	—
2023–24	CSKA Moscow	KHL	11	0	2	2	2	—	—	—	—	—
2024–25	Krasnaya Armiya	MHL	38	4	20	24	10	6	0	1	1	2
2024–25	Zvezda Moscow	VHL	2	1	0	1	2	—	—	—	—	—
2025–26	CSKA Moscow	KHL	21	0	1	1	4	—	—	—	—	—
2025–26	Zvezda Moscow	VHL	12	0	1	1	4	—	—	—	—	—
2025–26	Krasnaya Armiya	MHL	15	2	1	3	4	2	0	1	1	2
KHL totals			32	0	3	3	6	—	—	—	—	—
