= Vítek Vaněček =

Czech ice hockey player (born 1996)

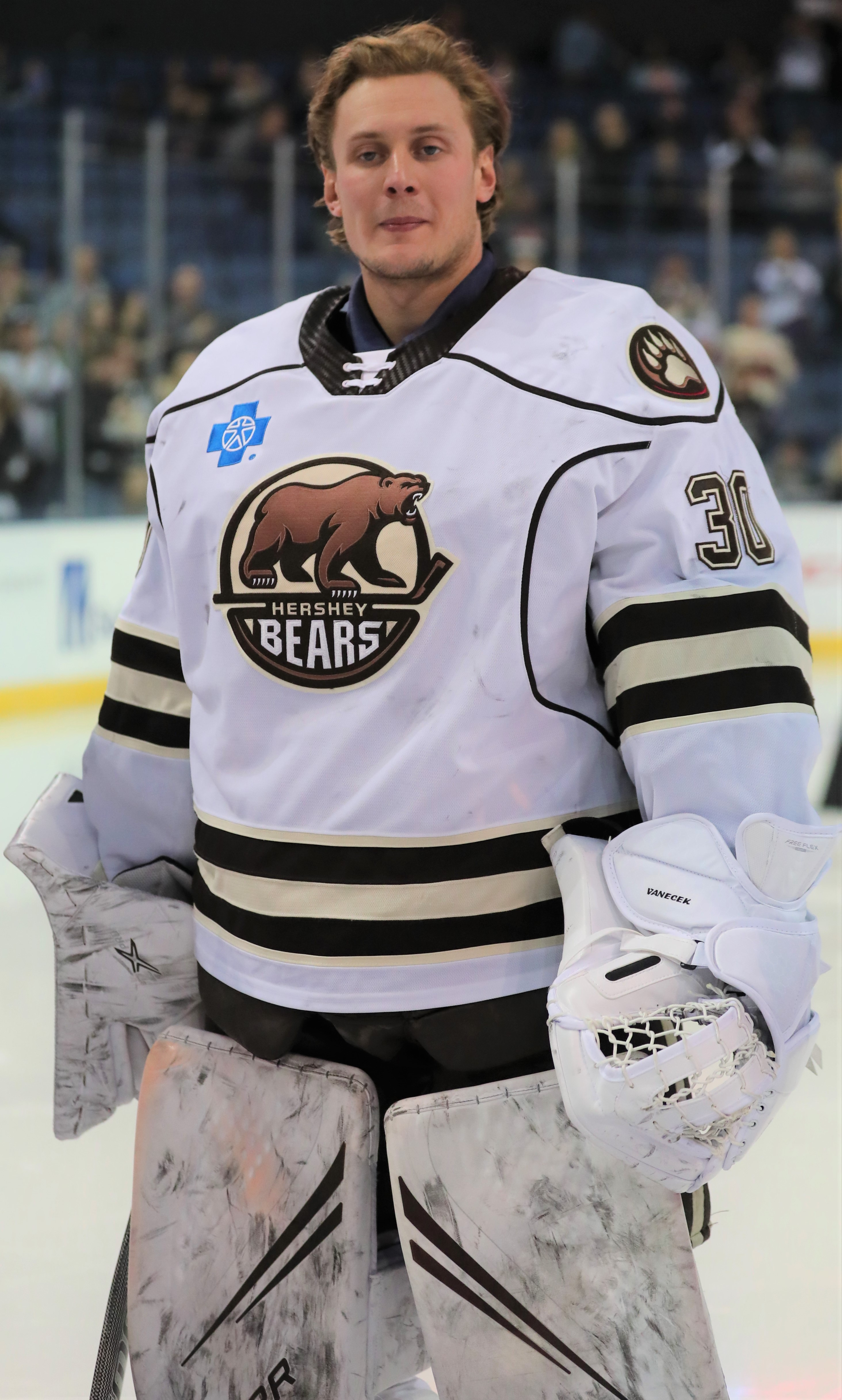
- Vaněček with the Hershey Bears in 2020
- Born: 9 January 1996 (age 30) Havlíčkův Brod, Czech Republic
- Height: 6 ft 2 in (188 cm)
- Weight: 184 lb (83 kg; 13 st 2 lb)
- Position: Goaltender
- Catches: Left
- NHL team (P) Cur. team Former teams: New York Islanders; Hamilton Hammers (AHL); HC Bílí Tygři Liberec; Washington Capitals; New Jersey Devils; San Jose Sharks; Florida Panthers; Utah Mammoth
- NHL draft: 39th overall, 2014; Washington Capitals
- Playing career: 2014–present

Vítek Vaněček (born 9 January 1996) is a Czech professional ice hockey player who is a goaltender for the Hamilton Hammers in the American Hockey League (AHL) while under contract to the New York Islanders of the National Hockey League (NHL). He won the Stanley Cup with the Florida Panthers in 2025.

== Playing career ==
Vaněček originally played as a youth with HC Havlíčkův Brod through to the under-18 level before joining the ranks of HC Bílí Tygři Liberec in 2013.

Vaněček was picked 39th overall in the 2014 NHL entry draft by the Washington Capitals. On 15 July 2014, he was signed to a three-year entry-level contract with the Capitals.

In the 2014–15 season, he played two games with the HC Bílí Tygři Liberec of the Czech Extraliga and spent much of the rest of the season with HC Benátky nad Jizerou of the 1st Czech Republic Hockey League.

=== Washington Capitals ===
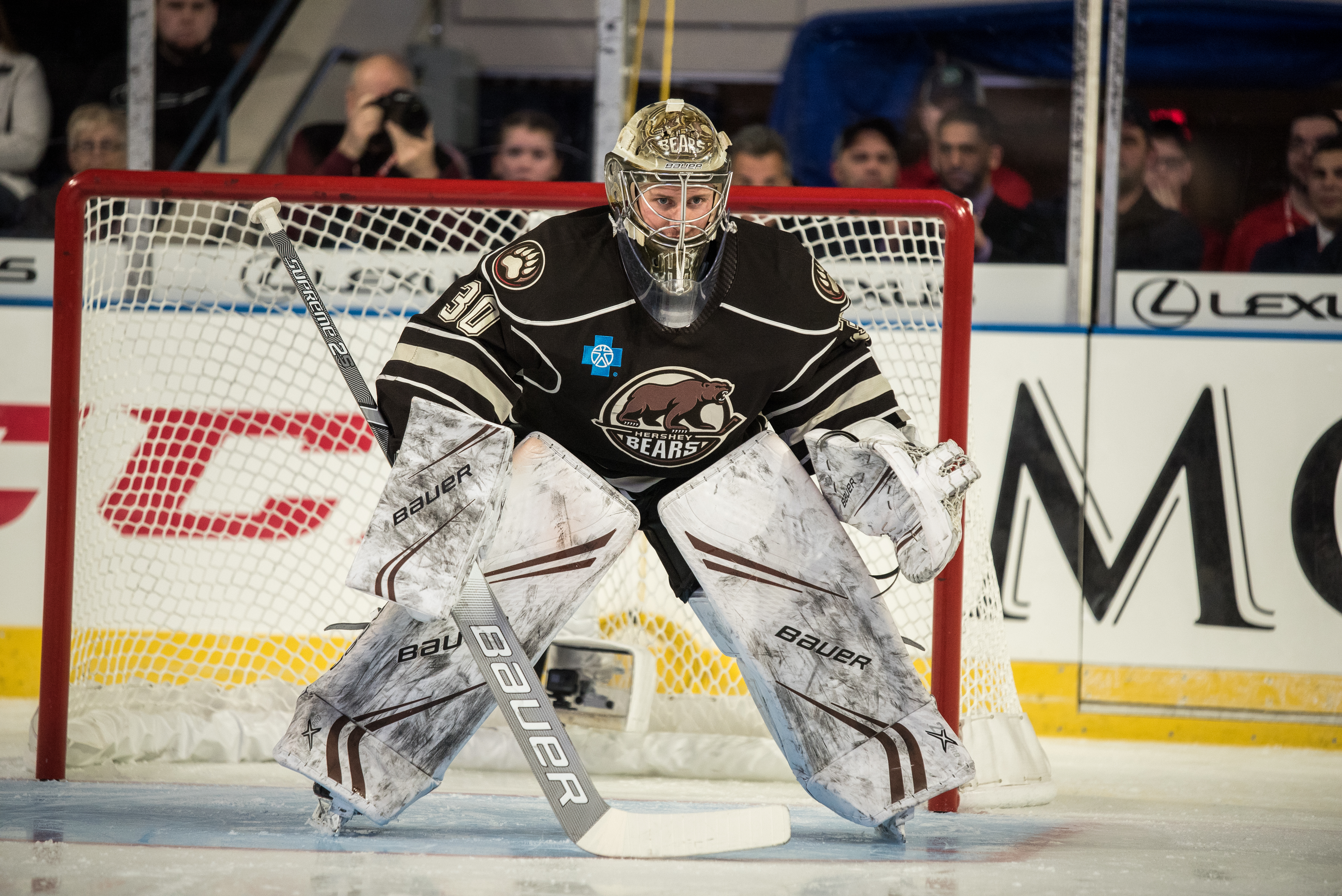
Vaněček with the Hershey Bears in 2019

Vaněček continued his career the following season in North America, splitting time between playing for the South Carolina Stingrays and the Hershey Bears, affiliates to the Capitals. Following a successful 2015–16 season with the Stingrays, he was selected to the ECHL All-Rookie Team.

In 2019, Vaněček was selected to his first AHL All-Star classic roster. Later in 2020, Vaněček would replace Michael Sgarbossa on the 2020 AHL All-Star classic roster. He would go on to be named MVP of the event after leading the Atlantic Division to a championship, only allowing two goals in four games.

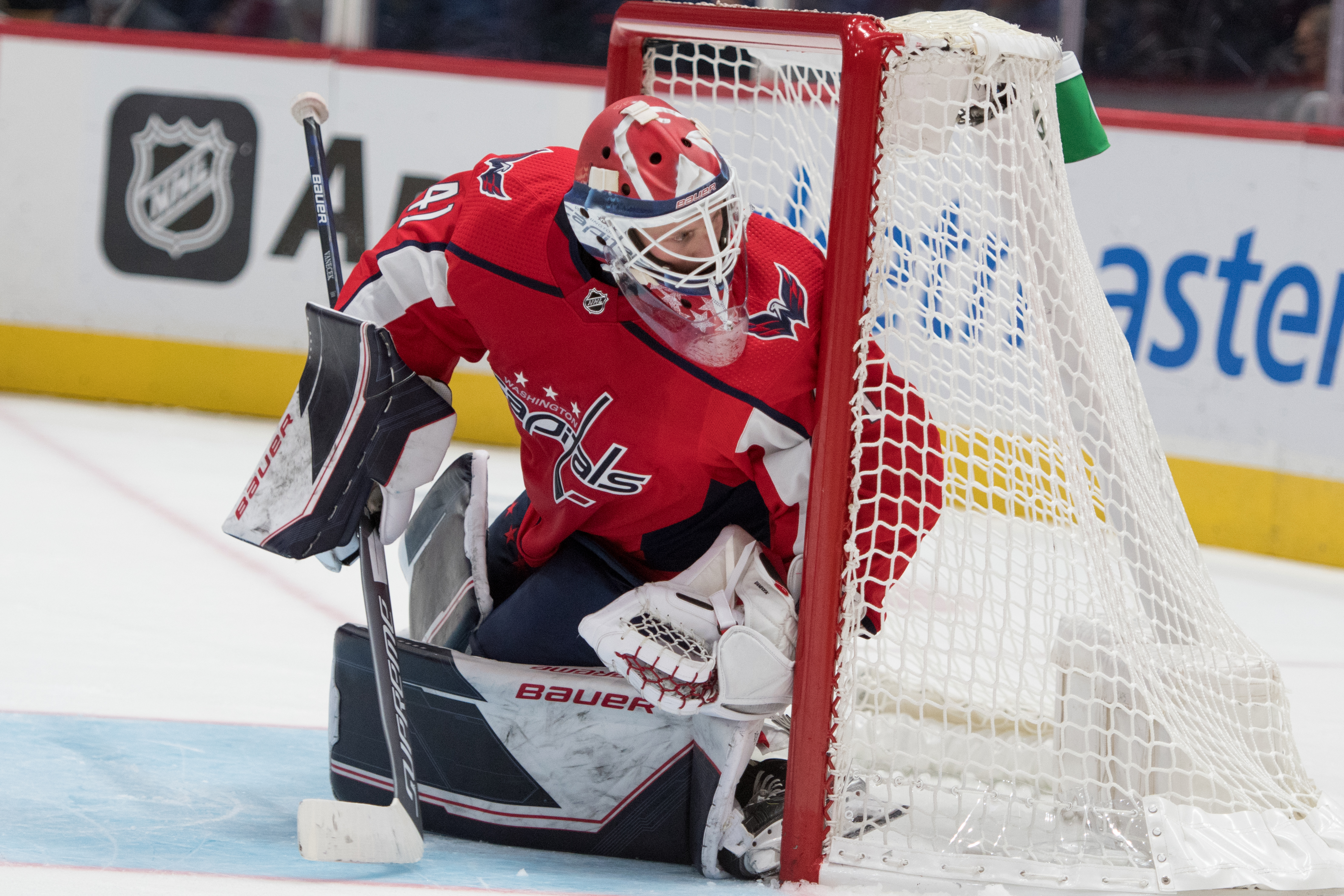
Vaněček with the Capitals in 2021

Vaněček was named as the Capitals' backup goaltender shortly before the 2020–21 season, backing up Ilya Samsonov. However, Samsonov was placed on the COVID-19 protocol list in mid-January after only two appearances, and Vaněček was subsequently thrust into the spotlight for the Capitals. Vaněček started in his first NHL game on 15 January 2021, saving 30 of 31 shots and earning his first victory as the Capitals defeated the Buffalo Sabres 2–1. Vaněček won NHL's Rookie of the Month for January 2021. He recorded his first NHL shutout on 15 March, in a 6–0 victory over the Buffalo Sabres. When Samsonov landed in protocol again, Vaněček started game one for Washington in the 2021 Stanley Cup playoffs. However, he was injured early in the game and had to be replaced by Craig Anderson.

On 21 July 2021, Vaněček was selected from the Capitals at the 2021 NHL expansion draft by the Seattle Kraken. The Kraken traded him back to the Capitals a week later for a second-round pick in 2023. Vaněček's highest save shutout came on 3 March 2022, when the Capitals beat the Hurricanes 4–0. Vanecek made 36 saves.

=== New Jersey Devils ===
For the second consecutive off-season, Vaněček left the Capitals organization after he was traded at the 2022 NHL entry draft to the New Jersey Devils in exchange for a swap of second-round draft picks and a third-round pick on 8 July 2022. As a restricted free agent, Vaněček was later signed to a three-year, $10.2 million contract extension with the Devils on 19 July.

=== San Jose Sharks ===
On 8 March 2024, Vaněček along with a 2025 seventh-round pick was traded to the San Jose Sharks in exchange for Kaapo Kähkönen. In the 2024–25 season, Vaněček was hampered by injury through his tenure with the rebuilding Sharks, limited to just 18 games in posting just 3 wins.

=== Florida Panthers ===
On 5 March 2025, Vaněček was traded by the Sharks to the Florida Panthers in exchange for Patrick Giles. Assuming backup duties to Sergei Bobrovsky, Vaněček posted 2 wins in 7 regular season appearances. He did not feature in the post-season, as the Panthers claimed their second successive Stanley Cup.

=== Utah Mammoth ===
As a free agent from the Panthers, Vaněček was signed to a one-year, $1.5 million contract with the Utah Mammoth for the 2025–26 season on 1 July 2025. Serving as the Mammoth backup to Karel Vejmelka, Vaněček featured in 22 games, posting a 5-13-3 record and 1 shutout.

=== New York Islanders ===
At the conclusion of his contract with the Mammoth, Vaněček joined his sixth NHL club after signing a one-year, $1 million contract with the New York Islanders on 1 July 2026.

== International play ==
Vaněček played three games at the 2015 World Junior Ice Hockey Championships for the Czech Republic men's national junior ice hockey team.

== Career statistics ==
=== Regular season and playoffs ===
			Regular season									Playoffs
Season	Team	League	GP	W	L	OT	MIN	GA	SO	GAA	SV%	GP	W	L	MIN	GA	SO	GAA	SV%
2013–14	HC Bílí Tygři Liberec	Czech.20	38	21	17	0	2,156	95	2	2.64	.921	4	1	3	213	15	0	4.23	.899
2014–15	HC Benátky nad Jizerou	Czech.1	20	10	10	0	1,178	44	0	2.24	.925	5	2	3	282	13	0	2.77	.902
2014–15	HC Bílí Tygři Liberec	Czech.20	4	3	1	0	240	12	1	3.00	.919	—	—	—	—	—	—	—	—
2014–15	HC Bílí Tygři Liberec	ELH	2	0	2	0	120	3	0	1.50	.943	—	—	—	—	—	—	—	—
2015–16	South Carolina Stingrays	ECHL	32	18	7	6	1,867	63	4	2.03	.917	11	6	2	624	24	1	2.31	.914
2015–16	Hershey Bears	AHL	1	1	0	0	65	1	0	0.92	.962	—	—	—	—	—	—	—	—
2016–17	Hershey Bears	AHL	39	18	10	7	2,147	91	5	2.54	.909	4	1	2	196	9	0	2.75	.910
2017–18	Hershey Bears	AHL	32	12	13	2	1,685	86	2	3.04	.888	—	—	—	—	—	—	—	—
2017–18	South Carolina Stingrays	ECHL	2	1	1	0	119	4	0	2.01	.935	—	—	—	—	—	—	—	—
2018–19	Hershey Bears	AHL	38	21	10	6	2,220	97	2	2.62	.907	4	1	3	241	9	1	2.25	.935
2019–20	Hershey Bears	AHL	31	19	10	1	1,832	69	2	2.26	.917	—	—	—	—	—	—	—	—
2020–21	Washington Capitals	NHL	37	21	10	4	2,115	95	2	2.69	.908	1	0	0	13	1	0	4.56	.750
2021–22	Washington Capitals	NHL	42	20	12	6	2,317	103	4	2.67	.908	2	1	1	99	7	0	4.20	.863
2022–23	New Jersey Devils	NHL	52	33	11	4	2,916	119	3	2.45	.911	7	1	3	272	21	0	4.64	.825
2023–24	New Jersey Devils	NHL	32	17	9	3	1,792	95	0	3.18	.890	—	—	—	—	—	—	—	—
2024–25	San Jose Sharks	NHL	18	3	10	3	973	63	0	3.88	.882	—	—	—	—	—	—	—	—
2024–25	San Jose Barracuda	AHL	1	1	0	0	60	2	0	2.00	.917	—	—	—	—	—	—	—	—
2024–25	Florida Panthers	NHL	7	2	4	1	421	21	1	3.00	.890	—	—	—	—	—	—	—	—
2025–26	Utah Mammoth	NHL	22	5	13	3	1,206	59	1	2.93	.883	—	—	—	—	—	—	—	—
NHL totals			210	101	69	24	11,740	565	11	2.84	.900	10	2	4	385	29	0	4.52	.834

=== International ===
Year	Team	Event	Result	GP	W	L	OT	MIN	GA	SO	GAA	SV%
2013	Czech Republic	IH18	3rd place, bronze medalist(s)	4	—	—	—	—	—	—	2.89	.921
2014	Czech Republic	U18	2nd place, silver medalist(s)	7	5	2	0	437	20	0	2.74	.897
2015	Czech Republic	WJC	6th	3	1	2	0	181	13	0	4.31	.828
2016	Czech Republic	WJC	5th	5	2	3	0	264	12	1	2.73	.881
Junior totals				19	8	7	0	882	45	1	3.06	.889

== Awards and honours ==
Award	Year	Ref
NHL
Stanley Cup champion	2025	
