= WKKT =

Coordinates: 35.533°N 80.796°W

- Statesville, North Carolina; United States
- Broadcast area: Metrolina
- Frequency: 96.9 MHz (HD Radio)
- Branding: 96.9 The Kat

Programming
- Format: Country music
- Affiliations: Premiere Networks

Ownership
- Owner: iHeartMedia, Inc.; (iHM Licenses, LLC)
- Sister stations: WEND, WHQC, WLKO, WRFX, W254AZ

History
- First air date: March 16, 1961
- Former call signs: WDBM-FM (1961–1973); WOOO (1973–1981); WLVV (1981–1985); WLVK (1985–1990); WTDR (1990–1997)
- Call sign meaning: Kat Kountry

Technical information
- Licensing authority: FCC
- Facility ID: 68207
- Class: C
- ERP: 100,000 watts
- HAAT: 472 meters (1,549 ft)

Links
- Public license information: Public file; LMS
- Webcast: Listen live (via iHeartRadio)
- Website: 969thekat.iheart.com

WKKT (96.9 FM) is a commercial radio station licensed to Statesville, North Carolina, and serving the Charlotte - Metrolina radio market. It airs a country format and is owned by iHeartMedia, Inc. WKKT features two syndicated programs on weekdays from co-owned Premiere Networks: The Bobby Bones Show in evenings and After Midnite with Granger Smith overnight. WKKT's studios are in the 2100 building on South Tryon Street in South End, while its tower is on Mill Pond Lane near Shearers Road in Mooresville.

WKKT is a Class C station. It has an effective radiated power (ERP) of 100,000 watts, the maximum for most FM stations. It broadcasts using HD Radio technology. In the Boone area, WKKT is subject to co-channel interference from WXBQ-FM, licensed to Bristol, Virginia. The transmitters of the two stations are less than 100 miles (160 km) apart and both use directional antennas.

== History ==
=== WDBM-FM and WOOO ===
The station signed on the air on March 16, 1961. Its original call sign was WDBM-FM, the sister station to co-owned AM daytime-only station 550 WDBM (now WAME). The original owner was Walter B. Duke, with both stations simulcasting their programming. When WDBM 550 would go off the air each evening at sunset, WDBM-FM would continued to broadcast. It was only powered at 3,000 watts, so the station signal was limited to the Statesville area.

The Duke family sold the stations in 1973, and the new owners separated the operations of the AM and FM outlets. At first, the FM station aired an automated Top 40 format with news supplied from the ABC Contemporary Network. It later tried an underground-style progressive rock sound, changing the call letters to WOOO and the station's slogan to "Triple-O-97".

=== WLVV ===
In 1980, Metrolina Communications of Orlando bought WOOO and WDBM for $660,000. The new owners planned a soft music format on WOOO, along with new call letters, WLVV. The station increased power from 9,000 to 100,000 watts with a new tower near Lake Norman, with the intention of covering Charlotte. The change to "Love 97" happened February 3, 1981. At first, problems with the new transmitter forced it to operate at reduced power.

Its initial format under the new call letters was "contemporary beautiful music" using an automated system called "The FM100 Plan." It later changed to Churchill Productions' "Radio One", a soft adult contemporary format. Popular announcers on the station in those years included Phil Green, Bob Brandon, Bob Chrysler, Dan Lucas, Dick Durante and Anne Cruse. WLVV finally reached full power in November 1981 and began showing up in Charlotte ratings. In 1982, a year after it officially became a full-market Charlotte station, Capitol Broadcasting bought WLVV for $2 million along with its AM sister station. At the time, WLVV played artists such as Journey, Billy Joel, The Pointer Sisters, Kenny Rogers and Hall & Oates.

=== Country music ===
Another ownership change came in 1985. The new management flipped the station to country music and changed the call letters to WLVK ("K-97"). In January 1989, Bill Blevins, using the on-air name Billy Buck, became the new morning host to compete with Charlotte's top DJ, Bill Dollar on WSOC.

On March 23, 1990, the station switched to a more youthful "high-octane country" format as WTDR "Thunder 96.9." The first song was "If You Don't Like Hank Williams" by Hank Williams Jr. Research showed many male listeners who liked country music also listened to leading album rock station 99.7 WRFX. Program director Mark Tudor said the previous target audience was 25-54, while the new audience for Thunder 96.9 was 21-37, specifically a median age of 33. The playlist included newer hits and less gold. Country-style rock songs in the new format included "Move It On Over" by George Thorogood and "Sharp Dressed Man" by ZZ Top. Softer acts such as Kenny Rogers, Crystal Gayle and Anne Murray were no longer played, though Ronnie Milsap's "Smoky Mountain Rain" and George Jones' "He Stopped Loving Her Today" were acceptable. Liners included "Slammin' the Door on the Same Old Country" (referring to WSOC-FM), "Country Without the Restrictor Plate" and "Playing What You Asked for 'Cause No One Else Will".

The experiment didn't last long, and the station went back to a more standard country sound under the moniker "New Country 96.9." However, the WTDR call sign remained for a while longer. Chuck Boozer returned to mornings on WTDR in 1994 after working afternoons at KPLX in Dallas.

former logo; typeface is still the same, but now says "The Kat".

=== WKKT Kat Country ===
The call sign was changed to the current WKKT in 1997. Along with the new call letters came a new nickname, "96.9 Kat Country." In December 1997, Paul Schadt moved to WKKT after 16 years at WSOC. Schadt and Sarah Lee host morning drive time on the station. Most iHeart Country stations carryThe Bobby Bones Show live on weekday mornings from sister station WSIX-FM Nashville. But WKKT delays the show for airing in the evening.

WKKT's HD2 digital subchannel once carried a children's radio format known as "Kids Club Radio", mixing contemporary hits with music from popular kids shows and movies. Under the new name "iHeart Family Kids Club Radio," it remains on the iHeartRadio website and app. But the WKKT subchannel has since been turned off.
