= Patrick Giles (ice hockey) =

American ice hockey player (born 2000)

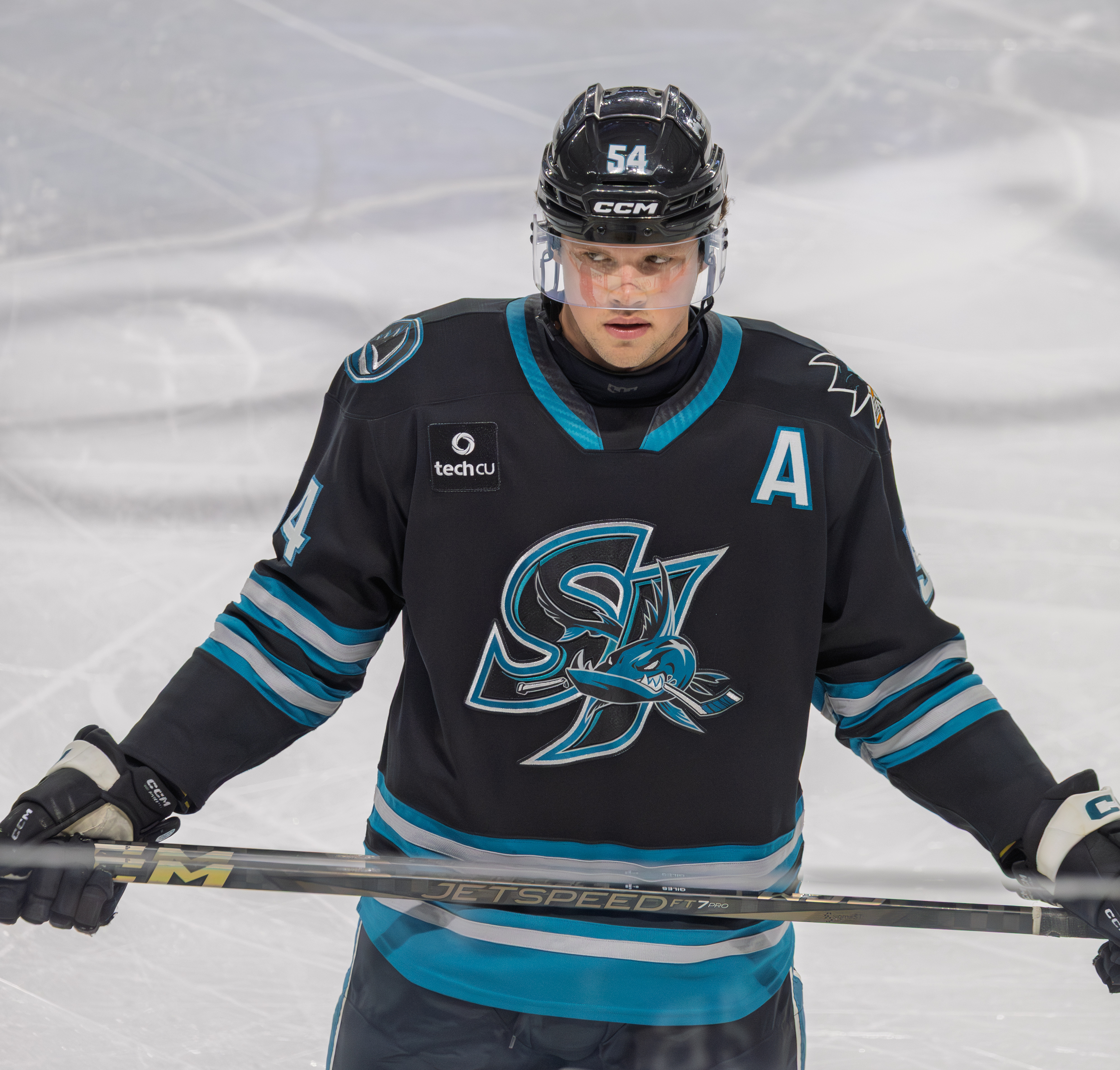
- Giles with the San Jose Barracuda in 2026
- Born: 3 January 2000 (age 26) Chevy Chase, Maryland, U.S.
- Height: 6 ft 5 in (196 cm)
- Weight: 220 lb (100 kg; 15 st 10 lb)
- Position: Right wing
- Shoots: Right
- NHL team (P) Cur. team Former teams: San Jose Sharks; San Jose Barracuda (AHL); Florida Panthers
- NHL draft: Undrafted
- Playing career: 2022–present

Patrick Giles (born 3 January 2000) is an American professional ice hockey right winger for the San Jose Barracuda of the American Hockey League (AHL) while under contract to the San Jose Sharks of the National Hockey League (NHL).

== Playing career ==
Giles played four seasons of collegiate ice hockey with Boston College, before he made his professional debut at the end of the 2021–22 season, initially joining the Charlotte Checkers of the AHL on a try-out with a one-year contract for the following season. In completing the season with the Checkers, Giles was later signed to a two-year, entry-level contract with the Checkers' NHL affiliate, the Florida Panthers, prior to the commencement of the 2022–23 season on 21 September 2022.

During the 2024–25 season, on 5 March 2025, he was traded to the San Jose Sharks in exchange for Vítek Vaněček.

== Career statistics ==
=== Regular season and playoffs ===
			Regular season					Playoffs
Season	Team	League	GP	G	A	Pts	PIM	GP	G	A	Pts	PIM
2014–15	Landon School	USHS	12	6	9	15	16	—	—	—	—	—
2015–16	Landon School	USHS	7	13	6	19	8	—	—	—	—	—
2016–17	U.S. National Development Team	USHL	34	2	4	6	28	—	—	—	—	—
2017–18	U.S. National Development Team	USHL	26	2	4	6	26	—	—	—	—	—
2018–19	Boston College	HE	37	1	5	6	14	—	—	—	—	—
2019–20	Boston College	HE	10	3	2	5	4	—	—	—	—	—
2020–21	Boston College	HE	24	3	9	12	16	—	—	—	—	—
2021–22	Boston College	HE	37	15	7	22	26	—	—	—	—	—
2021–22	Charlotte Checkers	AHL	10	0	1	1	0	7	0	2	2	9
2022–23	Charlotte Checkers	AHL	72	3	10	13	28	7	1	0	1	4
2023–24	Charlotte Checkers	AHL	66	13	10	23	31	3	0	0	0	2
2024–25	Florida Panthers	NHL	9	0	0	0	0	—	—	—	—	—
2024–25	Charlotte Checkers	AHL	39	5	2	7	39	—	—	—	—	—
2024–25	San Jose Sharks	NHL	8	1	0	1	0	—	—	—	—	—
2024–25	San Jose Barracuda	AHL	8	4	0	4	6	6	0	2	2	4
2025–26	San Jose Barracuda	AHL	67	10	14	24	14	2	0	0	0	2
2025–26	San Jose Sharks	NHL	3	0	1	1	0	—	—	—	—	—
NHL totals			20	1	1	2	0	—	—	—	—	—

=== International ===
Year	Team	Event	Result	GP	G	A	Pts	PIM
2016	United States	U17	5th	5	1	2	3	0
2018	United States	U18	2nd place, silver medalist(s)	7	1	1	2	4
Junior totals				12	2	3	5	4
