= Skratch 'N Sniff =

- Genre: Rock/hip-hop mashup
- Running time: 1–2 hrs
- Country of origin: United States
- Language: English
- Hosted by: Malcolm Ryker; Allison Hagendorf
- Produced by: Chris Cantore
- Original release: March 9, 2003 – present
- Audio format: Stereo
- Website: snsmix.com

Skratch 'N Sniff is a nationally syndicated American radio program. The show is hosted by radio imaging Malcolm Ryker, American music journalist Allison Hagendorf, and produced by Chris Cantore. The weekly show mixes rock and hip-hop music for affiliates across the U.S., Canada, and Mexico.

== History ==
The show first began on March 9, 2003 at San Diego rock station XETRA-FM (91.1 FM, "91X"). Rock-oriented Ryker had contacted hip-hop DJ Mike Czech, then at San Diego pop station XHITZ-FM (90.3 FM, "Z90"), with the idea of combining their respective formats in a blended mashup show. By 2007, the show was airing on nearly 30 rock alternative rock and even a few Rock leaning Contemporary hits radio stations; Westwood One, the radio network acquired by Dial Global, began syndication of Skratch 'N Sniff that same year. In 2008, the show expanded from one to two hours in most markets. Compass Media Networks took over syndication of Skratch 'N Sniff in 2012.

== Current status ==
Today the show serves nearly 60 affiliates, including stations in Washington, D.C. (WWDC (FM)), Detroit, Alt 104.5 the QUAD Cities Alternative https://alt1045.iheart.com/ Saturday nights 11- 2 EDT (Confirmed June 27, 2026) and Tampa. SEE ACTIVE STATIONS HERE https://snsmix.com/radio/ In recent years, Skratch 'N Sniff has also offered limited content to non-market affiliates from the show's annual Halloween special.

In September 2024, Skratch 'N Sniff rebooted with SNS 2.0, with Mike Czech leaving, Allison Hagendorf joining as a host, and Chris Cantore joining as producer.
