= Performance Racing Network =

American radio network covering motor racing events

- Type: Division of Speedway Motorsports
- Industry: Radio Network
- Founded: 1981; 45 years ago
- Headquarters: Charlotte Motor Speedway Concord, North Carolina
- Key people: Doug Rice, Gerry Horn, Brad Gillie, Harrill Hamrick, Alexis Erickson, Kent Bernhardt.
- Products: NASCAR racing and radio programming
- Number of employees: Roughly 70
- Website: www.goprn.com

The Performance Racing Network or PRN for short is a radio syndication network controlled by Speedway Motorsports (SMI) founded in 1981. PRN airs NASCAR Cup Series and Xfinity Series events held at Speedway Motorsports owned tracks.

PRN first began airing the NASCAR events at Charlotte Motor Speedway (including the Coca-Cola 600, the fall race, but not the NASCAR All-Star Race). After SMI acquired additional tracks, the network began airing the events at Atlanta, Austin (managed by SMI for the NASCAR event), Bristol, Dover, Kentucky, Las Vegas, Nashville, New Hampshire, Sonoma and Texas tracks as well. Starting in 2004, PRN has also aired the NASCAR weekend at the Indianapolis Motor Speedway through a joint production with the IMS Radio Network.

Other NASCAR events (those operated by NASCAR itself following the absorption of International Speedway Corporation (ISC), Curtis Francois and the Mattioli family), are broadcast by NASCAR-owned Motor Racing Network (MRN). On most occasions, PRN and MRN share the same radio affiliates in order to broadcast a complete NASCAR schedule. The only exception is if one station in the same market is a full-time NTT IndyCar Series radio affiliate, where the INDYCAR Radio affiliate has first right of refusal, and the Indianapolis races may belong to the IMS station if they oblige.

PRN and MRN, as of 2025, also collaborate as the NASCAR Racing Network to carry all NASCAR Craftsman Truck Series events, with distribution handled by MRN.

All PRN shows with the exception of all race broadcasts and the pre and post race shows originate from Performance Racing Network's studios at Charlotte Motor Speedway.

All PRN race broadcasts are available via Sirius XM NASCAR Radio. Fast Talk is also carried on Sirius XM NASCAR Radio on Wednesdays at 10:00 p.m. eastern time. Fast Talk, the O'Reilly Pit Reporters and Garage Pass can all be heard online at PRN's website.

== Programming ==
PRN's schedule includes the following:

- Fast Talk: Doug Rice hosts the show with Alexis Erickson and Brad Gillie, The special co-hosts include Kyle Petty, Jeff Hammond and Hermie Sadler. The rotating host format was adopted after the death of Benny Parsons, who had hosted the show during the first 14 seasons. It is a call-in show that airs Mondays at 7:00 p.m. Eastern time. Fast Talk is heard on 220 stations, fifty-two weeks a year. Fast Talk is also live video streamed and can be viewed at PRN's website.
- Garage Pass: Mark Garrow and Steve Richards (substitute) anchor this four-minute NASCAR news program. Garage Pass is heard on 450 stations across the US. The program was created by Garrow in 1986 under the name "Winston Cup USA" and ran on a handful of stations for one year. In 1987, Garrow partnered with Capitol Sports Network in Raleigh, North Carolina to network and sell the program. The name was changed to "Winston Cup Today" and grew to approximately 480 stations at its peak. Richards produced the program, served as substitute host, and covered the majority of the scheduled NASCAR events. Midway into the 1999 season, the show was ended by Capitol Broadcasting when NASCAR demanded rights fees for the use of audio originating from the racetrack. In 2000, Garrow partnered with Performance Racing Network as the show was resurrected and renamed "Garagepass" as the rights fee issue was settled. 2011 marked the 25th year Garrow has produced a daily NASCAR news program. Richards, who began his radio career in 1977, has been covering the sport on a full-time basis for about 15 years, and before that on a part-time basis from 1985. He also covered Duke, NC State and University of North Carolina basketball and football from 1986 until the mid-nineties for WRAL FM and the North Carolina News Network. Richards produced and anchored the scoreboard shows on the Duke and NC State football networks.
- O'Reilly Auto Parts Pit Reporters: Brett McMillan hosts a panel-driven show with journalists discussing the issues of the week in NASCAR Racing, primarily in the Sprint Cup. Other forms of racing are occasionally talked about if the news is important enough.
- Racing Country: A weekly, two-hour country music-oriented program hosted by WKKT morning disc jockey Paul Schadt with Cathy Martindale, with news from both country music and NASCAR. Top country artists and NASCAR drivers are featured in interviews, as is a rundown of the week's popular country songs. This is a 52-week program (no off-season breaks). The program dates back to 1989 and was formerly known as NASCAR Country before losing the rights to the NASCAR name circa 2000. Its slogan is "the two fastest hours on the radio". The program comes in two versions: one for current country music radio stations and one for classic country radio stations.

' Brad Gillie co-hosts a late night call-in show on Sirius XM NASCAR Radio called Late-Shift Monday and Tuesday nights from 7:00 to 10:00 p.m. eastern time. He now does the show with Todd Gordon. Gillie also is a frequent co-host of Press-Pass every Saturday from 11:00 a.m. to 2:00 p.m. eastern time. Pat Patterson hosts a weekend morning call-in show called The Frontstretch from 7:00 to 11:00 a.m. during the season and 9:00 to noon in the offseason.

== Announcers ==
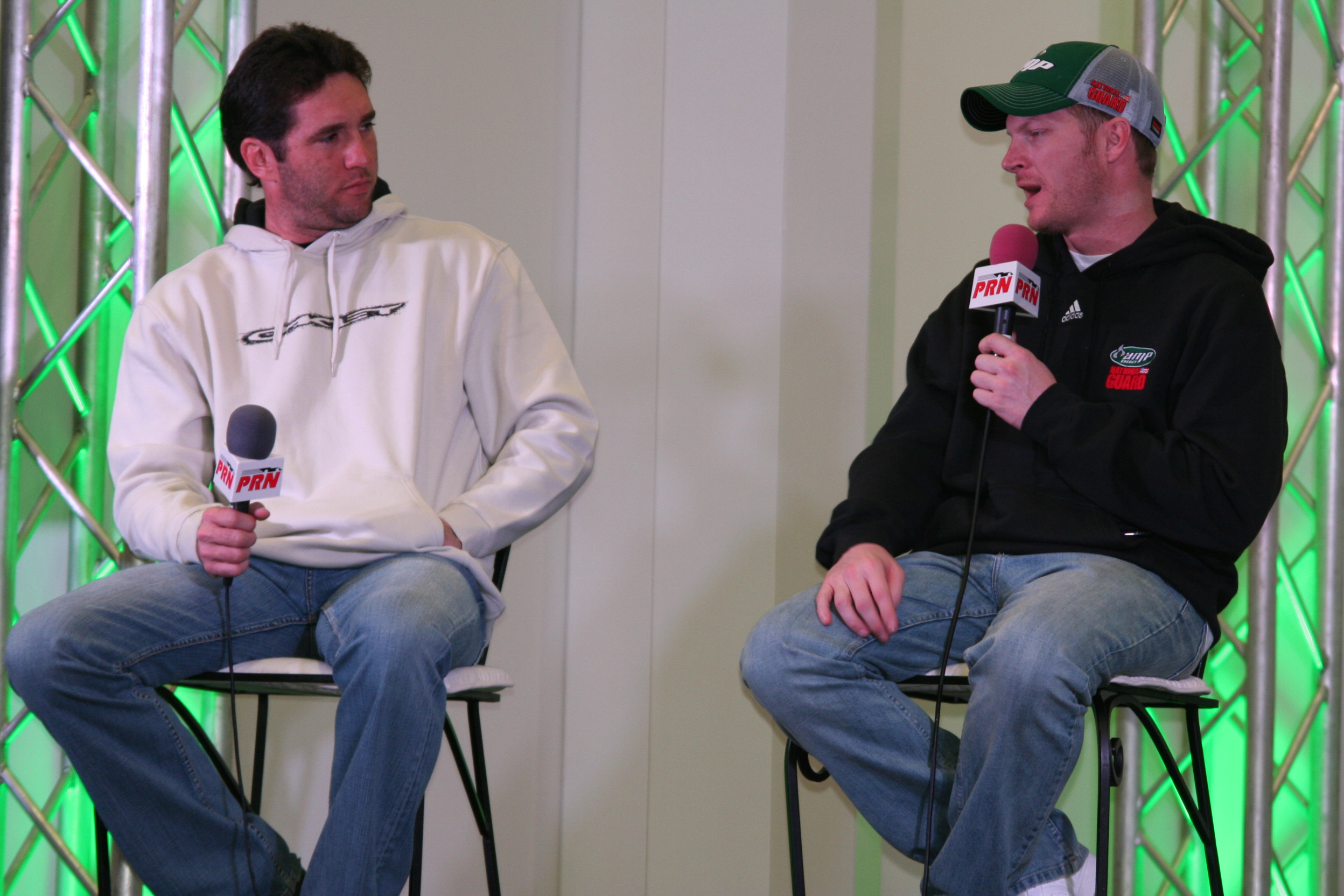
Elliott Sadler and Dale Earnhardt Jr. in an interview on Performance Racing Network

=== Booth announcers ===
- Brad Gillie (lead announcer)
- Nick Yeoman (announcer for Cup Series Races, Veteran announcer for the Indycar/IMS Radio Network)

=== Turn announcers ===
- Pat Patterson (host of The Frontstretch on Sirius XM NASCAR Radio) (Turns 3 and 4 at Las Vegas and Atlanta)

Note:

- For road course races, the Indianapolis Motor Speedway Radio Network will provide additional turn announcers.

=== Pit reporters ===
- Brett McMillan (host of O'Reilly Auto Parts Pit Reporters)
- Doug Turnbull (fill-in pit reporter and turn announcer)
- Lenny Batycki (fill-in reporter)
- Heather DeBeaux (fill-in pit reporter)
- Alan Cavanna (fill-in pit reporter)
- Wendy Venturini (pit reporter)
- Andrew Kurland (pit reporter)

=== Former announcers ===
- Doug Rice (Lead Announcer)
- Chuck Carland (Turns 3 & 4)
- Steve Richards (pit reporter)
- Randy Pemberton (pit reporter)
- Rob Albright (Turns 1 & 2)
- Mark Garrow (co-anchor)
