= 2024–25 NHL transactions =

The following is a list of all team-to-team transactions that occurred in the National Hockey League for the 2024–25 NHL season. It lists which team each player has been traded to, signed by, or claimed by, and for which player(s) or draft pick(s), if applicable. Players who have retired or that have had their contracts terminated are also listed.

The 2024–25 NHL trade deadline was on March 7, 2025. Players traded or claimed off waivers after that date were not eligible to play in the 2025 Stanley Cup playoffs.

== Retirement ==
Date	Player	Last team	Ref
July 8, 2024	Steven Fogarty	Minnesota Wild	
July 16, 2024	Joe Pavelski	Dallas Stars	
September 5, 2024	Marc Staal	Philadelphia Flyers	
September 5, 2024	Alex Goligoski	Minnesota Wild	
September 12, 2024	Alex Stalock	Anaheim Ducks	
September 15, 2024	Antti Raanta	Carolina Hurricanes	
September 17, 2024	Chris Wideman	Montreal Canadiens	
September 19, 2024	Kyle Okposo	Florida Panthers	
September 27, 2024	Bryan Little	Utah Hockey Club	
October 27, 2024	Marco Scandella	St. Louis Blues	
November 14, 2024	Matt Irwin	Vancouver Canucks	
December 10, 2024	Kevin Shattenkirk	Boston Bruins	
December 12, 2024	Justin Schultz	Seattle Kraken	
April 8, 2025	Chaz Lucius	Winnipeg Jets	
April 13, 2025	Patrick Maroon^{1}	Chicago Blackhawks	
April 13, 2025	Alec Martinez^{2}	Chicago Blackhawks	
April 23, 2025	Cal Clutterbuck	New York Islanders	
April 30, 2025	David Savard^{3}	Montreal Canadiens	
May 15, 2025	Sam Gagner	Edmonton Oilers	
June 2, 2025	Jesper Fast	Carolina Hurricanes	
June 9, 2025	T.J. Oshie	Washington Capitals	
June 18, 2025	Nick Bonino	New York Rangers	
June 24, 2025	Matt Martin	New York Islanders	

1. Maroon announced on March 22, 2025 that he would retire at the conclusion of the season; Maroon played his last game in the Blackhawks' final home game of the year on April 13, 2025, forgoing the team's final two games on the road.
2. Martinez played his last game in the Blackhawks' final home game of the year on April 13, 2025, forgoing the team's final two games on the road.
3. Savard announced on April 18, 2025 that he would retire at the conclusion of the Canadiens' playoff campaign; the Canadiens were eliminated from the 2025 Stanley Cup playoffs on April 30, 2025.

== Contract terminations ==
A team and player may mutually agree to terminate a player's contract at any time. All players must clear waivers before having a contract terminated.

Buyouts can only occur at specific times of the year. For more details on contract terminations as buyouts:

Teams may buy out player contracts (after the conclusion of a season) for a portion of the remaining value of the contract, paid over a period of twice the remaining length of the contract. This reduced number and extended period is applied to the cap hit as well.

- If the player was under the age of 26 at the time of the buyout the player's pay and cap hit will reduced by a factor of 2/3 over the extended period.
- If the player was 26 or older at the time of the buyout the player's pay and cap hit will reduced by a factor of 1/3 over the extended period.
- If the player was 35 or older at the time of signing the contract the player's pay will be reduced by a factor of 1/3, but the cap hit will not be reduced over the extended period.

Injured players cannot be bought out.

Date	Player	Previous team	Notes	Ref
June 28, 2024	Ryan Suter	Dallas Stars	Buyout	
June 29, 2024	Cam Atkinson	Philadelphia Flyers	Buyout	
June 29, 2024	Jeff Skinner	Buffalo Sabres	Buyout	
June 30, 2024	Nikolai Knyzhov	San Jose Sharks	Buyout	
July 1, 2024	Adam Boqvist	Columbus Blue Jackets	Buyout	
July 1, 2024	Jack Campbell	Edmonton Oilers	Buyout	
July 1, 2024	Nate Schmidt	Winnipeg Jets	Buyout	
July 18, 2024	Evgeny Kuznetsov	Carolina Hurricanes	Mutual termination	
August 21, 2024	Ryan Johansen	Philadelphia Flyers	Termination^{1}	
August 29, 2024	Johnny Gaudreau	Columbus Blue Jackets	Termination^{2}	
October 3, 2024	Robin Lehner	Vegas Golden Knights	Termination settlement^{3}	
October 26, 2024	Pavel Novak	Minnesota Wild	Mutual termination	
October 30, 2024	Lukas Svejkovsky	Tampa Bay Lightning	Mutual termination	
November 29, 2024	Ilya Nikolaev	Calgary Flames	Mutual termination	
December 3, 2024	Daniil Chayka	Vegas Golden Knights	Mutual termination	
December 7, 2024	Brendan Lemieux	Carolina Hurricanes	Mutual termination	
December 12, 2024	Valtteri Pulli	San Jose Sharks	Mutual termination	
December 13, 2024	Henri Nikkanen	Winnipeg Jets	Mutual termination	
December 20, 2024	Tyler Johnson	Boston Bruins	Mutual termination	
December 29, 2024	Daniel Torgersson	Winnipeg Jets	Mutual termination	
January 29, 2025	Milos Kelemen	Utah Hockey Club	Mutual termination	
January 29, 2025	Marcus Sylvegard	St. Louis Blues	Mutual termination	
January 31, 2025	Brandon Saad	St. Louis Blues	Mutual termination	
February 1, 2025	Hardy Haman Aktell	Washington Capitals	Mutual termination	
February 9, 2025	Jesse Puljujarvi	Pittsburgh Penguins	Mutual termination	
May 30, 2025	Andrew Poturalski	San Jose Sharks	Mutual termination	
June 22, 2025	TJ Brodie	Chicago Blackhawks	Buyout	

1. The NHLPA formally grieved Johansen's contract termination on September 26, 2024. On August 12, 2025, an arbiter sided with the Flyers, affirming Johansen's termination.
2. Gaudreau's contract was terminated after his death as result of a road accident on August 29, 2024.
3. Lehner's contract was terminated when Lehner failed to appear at Vegas' training camp; Lehner claimed to have valid personal reasons for his absence, and the NHL ruled the situation an "unprecedented and highly unique" case, granting Vegas the termination of Lehner's contract, but with Lehner still receiving all compensation owed to him, though not counted against Vegas' salary cap.

== Free agency ==
Note: This does not include players who have re-signed with their previous team as an unrestricted free agent or as a restricted free agent.

Date	Player	New team	Previous team	Ref
July 1, 2024	Tyler Bertuzzi	Chicago Blackhawks	Toronto Maple Leafs	
July 1, 2024	Sam Carrick	New York Rangers	Edmonton Oilers	
July 1, 2024	Eric Robinson	Carolina Hurricanes	Buffalo Sabres	
July 1, 2024	Brandon Montour	Seattle Kraken	Florida Panthers	
July 1, 2024	Tyler Toffoli	San Jose Sharks	Winnipeg Jets	
July 1, 2024	Sam Lafferty	Buffalo Sabres	Chicago Blackhawks	
July 1, 2024	Jonathan Marchessault	Nashville Predators	Vegas Golden Knights	
July 1, 2024	Noah Gregor	Ottawa Senators	Toronto Maple Leafs	
July 1, 2024	Alec Martinez	Chicago Blackhawks	Vegas Golden Knights	
July 1, 2024	Anthony Stolarz	Toronto Maple Leafs	Florida Panthers	
July 1, 2024	Anthony Mantha	Calgary Flames	Vegas Golden Knights	
July 1, 2024	Brett Pesce	New Jersey Devils	Carolina Hurricanes	
July 1, 2024	Mac Hollowell	Pittsburgh Penguins	New York Rangers	
July 1, 2024	Matt Roy	Washington Capitals	Los Angeles Kings	
July 1, 2024	Oliver Ekman-Larsson	Toronto Maple Leafs	Florida Panthers	
July 1, 2024	Laurent Brossoit	Chicago Blackhawks	Winnipeg Jets	
July 1, 2024	David Perron	Ottawa Senators	Detroit Red Wings	
July 1, 2024	Craig Smith	Chicago Blackhawks	Dallas Stars	
July 1, 2024	Eric Comrie	Winnipeg Jets	Buffalo Sabres	
July 1, 2024	Jason Zucker	Buffalo Sabres	Nashville Predators	
July 1, 2024	Devin Cooley	Calgary Flames	San Jose Sharks	
July 1, 2024	Ian Cole	Utah Hockey Club	Vancouver Canucks	
July 1, 2024	Teuvo Teravainen	Chicago Blackhawks	Carolina Hurricanes	
July 1, 2024	Nikita Zadorov	Boston Bruins	Vancouver Canucks	
July 1, 2024	Patrick Maroon	Chicago Blackhawks	Boston Bruins	
July 1, 2024	Brandon Duhaime	Washington Capitals	Colorado Avalanche	
July 1, 2024	Yakov Trenin	Minnesota Wild	Colorado Avalanche	
July 1, 2024	Sean Monahan	Columbus Blue Jackets	Winnipeg Jets	
July 1, 2024	Viktor Arvidsson	Edmonton Oilers	Los Angeles Kings	
July 1, 2024	Steven Stamkos	Nashville Predators	Tampa Bay Lightning	
July 1, 2024	Joel Edmundson	Los Angeles Kings	Toronto Maple Leafs	
July 1, 2024	Jake DeBrusk	Vancouver Canucks	Boston Bruins	
July 1, 2024	Kevin Stenlund	Utah Hockey Club	Florida Panthers	
July 1, 2024	William Lagesson	Detroit Red Wings	Anaheim Ducks	
July 1, 2024	Kiefer Sherwood	Vancouver Canucks	Nashville Predators	
July 1, 2024	Brady Skjei	Nashville Predators	Carolina Hurricanes	
July 1, 2024	Cam Talbot	Detroit Red Wings	Los Angeles Kings	
July 1, 2024	Danton Heinen	Vancouver Canucks	Boston Bruins	
July 1, 2024	Brenden Dillon	New Jersey Devils	Winnipeg Jets	
July 1, 2024	Elias Lindholm	Boston Bruins	Vancouver Canucks	
July 1, 2024	Alex Barre-Boulet	Montreal Canadiens	Tampa Bay Lightning	
July 1, 2024	Kevin Connauton	Utah Hockey Club	Los Angeles Kings	
July 1, 2024	Warren Foegele	Los Angeles Kings	Edmonton Oilers	
July 1, 2024	Michael Amadio	Ottawa Senators	Vegas Golden Knights	
July 1, 2024	Sean Walker	Carolina Hurricanes	Colorado Avalanche	
July 1, 2024	Matt Grzelcyk	Pittsburgh Penguins	Boston Bruins	
July 1, 2024	Casey DeSmith	Dallas Stars	Vancouver Canucks	
July 1, 2024	Stefan Noesen	New Jersey Devils	Carolina Hurricanes	
July 1, 2024	Chandler Stephenson	Seattle Kraken	Vegas Golden Knights	
July 1, 2024	Tyson Jost	Carolina Hurricanes	Buffalo Sabres	
July 1, 2024	Max Jones	Boston Bruins	Anaheim Ducks	
July 1, 2024	Jake Bean	Calgary Flames	Columbus Blue Jackets	
July 1, 2024	Tomas Nosek	Florida Panthers	New Jersey Devils	
July 1, 2024	Derek Forbort	Vancouver Canucks	Boston Bruins	
July 1, 2024	Travis Boyd	Minnesota Wild	Utah Hockey Club	
July 1, 2024	Zach Aston-Reese	Vegas Golden Knights	Detroit Red Wings	
July 1, 2024	Scott Wedgewood	Nashville Predators	Dallas Stars	
July 1, 2024	Ryan Lomberg	Calgary Flames	Florida Panthers	
July 1, 2024	Tanner Laczynski	Vegas Golden Knights	Philadelphia Flyers	
July 1, 2024	Josh Brown	Edmonton Oilers	Utah Hockey Club	
July 1, 2024	Erik Gustafsson	Detroit Red Wings	New York Rangers	
July 1, 2024	Sheldon Dries	Detroit Red Wings	Vancouver Canucks	
July 1, 2024	Anthony Duclair	New York Islanders	Tampa Bay Lightning	
July 1, 2024	Brendan Smith	Dallas Stars	New Jersey Devils	
July 1, 2024	Matt Dumba	Dallas Stars	Tampa Bay Lightning	
July 1, 2024	Dennis Gilbert	Buffalo Sabres	Calgary Flames	
July 1, 2024	Nicolas Aube-Kubel	Buffalo Sabres	Washington Capitals	
July 1, 2024	Ilya Lyubushkin	Dallas Stars	Toronto Maple Leafs	
July 1, 2024	Taylor Raddysh	Washington Capitals	Chicago Blackhawks	
July 1, 2024	Jack Campbell	Detroit Red Wings	Edmonton Oilers	
July 1, 2024	Anthony Beauvillier	Pittsburgh Penguins	Nashville Predators	
July 1, 2024	Jiri Patera	Vancouver Canucks	Vegas Golden Knights	
July 1, 2024	Calvin de Haan	Colorado Avalanche	Tampa Bay Lightning	
July 1, 2024	Jimmy Huntington	Pittsburgh Penguins	Nashville Predators	
July 1, 2024	Riley Tufte	Boston Bruins	Colorado Avalanche	
July 1, 2024	AJ Greer	Florida Panthers	Calgary Flames	
July 1, 2024	Jeremy Davies	Ottawa Senators	Buffalo Sabres	
July 1, 2024	Alexander Wennberg	San Jose Sharks	New York Rangers	
July 1, 2024	Bokondji Imama	Pittsburgh Penguins	Ottawa Senators	
July 1, 2024	Collin Delia	Edmonton Oilers	Winnipeg Jets	
July 1, 2024	Kaapo Kahkonen	Winnipeg Jets	New Jersey Devils	
July 1, 2024	Shayne Gostisbehere	Carolina Hurricanes	Detroit Red Wings	
July 1, 2024	Nate Clurman	Pittsburgh Penguins	Colorado Avalanche	
July 1, 2024	Vincent Desharnais	Vancouver Canucks	Edmonton Oilers	
July 1, 2024	Jordan Oesterle	Boston Bruins	Calgary Flames	
July 1, 2024	Cole Koepke	Boston Bruins	Tampa Bay Lightning	
July 1, 2024	Billy Sweezey	Boston Bruins	Columbus Blue Jackets	
July 1, 2024	Jeffrey Viel	Boston Bruins	Winnipeg Jets	
July 1, 2024	Nathan Smith	Vancouver Canucks	Utah Hockey Club	
July 1, 2024	Chase Bradley	Colorado Avalanche	Detroit Red Wings	
July 1, 2024	Jeff Malott	Los Angeles Kings	Winnipeg Jets	
July 1, 2024	Corey Schueneman	St. Louis Blues	Colorado Avalanche	
July 1, 2024	Mike Hardman	New Jersey Devils	Chicago Blackhawks	
July 1, 2024	Joseph Cecconi	Minnesota Wild	Buffalo Sabres	
July 1, 2024	Jack Rathbone	Buffalo Sabres	Pittsburgh Penguins	
July 1, 2024	Jesse Ylonen	Tampa Bay Lightning	Montreal Canadiens	
July 1, 2024	Josh Dunne	Buffalo Sabres	Columbus Blue Jackets	
July 1, 2024	Connor Carrick	Edmonton Oilers	Seattle Kraken	
July 1, 2024	Ben Jones	Minnesota Wild	Calgary Flames	
July 1, 2024	Devin Shore	Minnesota Wild	Seattle Kraken	
July 1, 2024	Reese Johnson	Minnesota Wild	Chicago Blackhawks	
July 1, 2024	Brendan Gaunce	Minnesota Wild	Columbus Blue Jackets	
July 1, 2024	Cameron Crotty	Minnesota Wild	Utah Hockey Club	
July 1, 2024	Troy Grosenick	Minnesota Wild	Nashville Predators	
July 1, 2024	Felix Sandstrom	Buffalo Sabres	Philadelphia Flyers	
July 1, 2024	Colton White	New Jersey Devils	Anaheim Ducks	
July 1, 2024	Kyle Capobianco	Dallas Stars	Winnipeg Jets	
July 1, 2024	Blake Lizotte	Pittsburgh Penguins	Los Angeles Kings	
July 1, 2024	Jacob MacDonald	Colorado Avalanche	San Jose Sharks	
July 1, 2024	Tj Tynan	Colorado Avalanche	Los Angeles Kings	
July 1, 2024	Parker Kelly	Colorado Avalanche	Ottawa Senators	
July 1, 2024	Calle Rosen	Colorado Avalanche	St. Louis Blues	
July 1, 2024	Kole Lind	Dallas Stars	Seattle Kraken	
July 1, 2024	Lucas Carlsson	San Jose Sharks	Florida Panthers	
July 1, 2024	Glenn Gawdin	Los Angeles Kings	Anaheim Ducks	
July 1, 2024	Jack Studnicka	Los Angeles Kings	San Jose Sharks	
July 1, 2024	Reilly Walsh	Los Angeles Kings	Boston Bruins	
July 1, 2024	Cameron Hughes	Dallas Stars	Seattle Kraken	
July 1, 2024	Jeff Skinner	Edmonton Oilers	Buffalo Sabres	
July 1, 2024	Vinnie Hinostroza	Nashville Predators	Pittsburgh Penguins	
July 1, 2024	Jake Lucchini	Nashville Predators	Minnesota Wild	
July 1, 2024	Nick Blankenburg	Nashville Predators	Columbus Blue Jackets	
July 1, 2024	Matt Murray	Nashville Predators	Dallas Stars	
July 1, 2024	TJ Brodie	Chicago Blackhawks	Toronto Maple Leafs	
July 1, 2024	Ben Meyers	Seattle Kraken	Anaheim Ducks	
July 1, 2024	Jesper Boqvist	Florida Panthers	Boston Bruins	
July 1, 2024	Zemgus Girgensons	Tampa Bay Lightning	Buffalo Sabres	
July 1, 2024	Derrick Pouliot	Tampa Bay Lightning	Dallas Stars	
July 1, 2024	Steven Santini	Tampa Bay Lightning	Los Angeles Kings	
July 1, 2024	Brandon Biro	Seattle Kraken	Buffalo Sabres	
July 1, 2024	Nikolas Brouillard	Seattle Kraken	New York Rangers	
July 1, 2024	Maxime Lajoie	Seattle Kraken	Toronto Maple Leafs	
July 1, 2024	Mitchell Stephens	Seattle Kraken	Montreal Canadiens	
July 1, 2024	Chris Driedger	Florida Panthers	Seattle Kraken	
July 1, 2024	Ilya Samsonov	Vegas Golden Knights	Toronto Maple Leafs	
July 1, 2024	Jimmy Schuldt	San Jose Sharks	Seattle Kraken	
July 2, 2024	Joe Snively	Detroit Red Wings	Washington Capitals	
July 2, 2024	James Reimer	Buffalo Sabres	Detroit Red Wings	
July 2, 2024	Filip Roos	Ottawa Senators	Chicago Blackhawks	
July 2, 2024	Hayden Hodgson	Ottawa Senators	Los Angeles Kings	
July 2, 2024	Luke Philp	Washington Capitals	Chicago Blackhawks	
July 2, 2024	Spencer Smallman	Washington Capitals	Colorado Avalanche	
July 2, 2024	Adam Gaudette	Ottawa Senators	St. Louis Blues	
July 2, 2024	Casey Fitzgerald	New York Rangers	Florida Panthers	
July 2, 2024	Bo Groulx	New York Rangers	Anaheim Ducks	
July 2, 2024	Andrew Agozzino	Utah Hockey Club	Anaheim Ducks	
July 2, 2024	Erik Brannstrom	Colorado Avalanche	Ottawa Senators	
July 2, 2024	Victor Olofsson	Vegas Golden Knights	Buffalo Sabres	
July 2, 2024	Dylan Gambrell	Columbus Blue Jackets	Toronto Maple Leafs	
July 2, 2024	Colton Poolman	Buffalo Sabres	Calgary Flames	
July 2, 2024	Sebastian Aho	Pittsburgh Penguins	New York Islanders	
July 2, 2024	Anthony Richard	Philadelphia Flyers	Boston Bruins	
July 2, 2024	Tomas Tatar	New Jersey Devils	Seattle Kraken	
July 2, 2024	MacKenzie Entwistle	Florida Panthers	Chicago Blackhawks	
July 2, 2024	Colin Blackwell	Dallas Stars	Chicago Blackhawks	
July 2, 2024	Jaret Anderson-Dolan	Winnipeg Jets	Nashville Predators	
July 2, 2024	Robert Hagg	Vegas Golden Knights	Anaheim Ducks	
July 2, 2024	Cam Atkinson	Tampa Bay Lightning	Philadelphia Flyers	
July 2, 2024	Dakota Mermis	Toronto Maple Leafs	Minnesota Wild	
July 2, 2024	Philippe Myers	Toronto Maple Leafs	Tampa Bay Lightning	
July 2, 2024	Jansen Harkins	Anaheim Ducks	Pittsburgh Penguins	
July 2, 2024	Nate Schmidt	Florida Panthers	Winnipeg Jets	
July 2, 2024	Tyler Motte	Detroit Red Wings	Tampa Bay Lightning	
July 2, 2024	Jack Johnson	Columbus Blue Jackets	Colorado Avalanche	
July 2, 2024	Fredrik Karlstrom	New York Islanders	Dallas Stars	
July 2, 2024	Cal Burke	Vegas Golden Knights	Carolina Hurricanes	
July 3, 2024	P.O Joseph	St. Louis Blues	Pittsburgh Penguins	
July 3, 2024	Riley Stillman	Carolina Hurricanes	Buffalo Sabres	
July 3, 2024	Justin Kirkland	Calgary Flames	Utah Hockey Club	
July 3, 2024	William Carrier	Carolina Hurricanes	Vegas Golden Knights	
July 3, 2024	Carson Meyer	Anaheim Ducks	Columbus Blue Jackets	
July 3, 2024	Vladimir Tarasenko	Detroit Red Wings	Florida Panthers	
July 3, 2024	Andrew Poturalski	San Jose Sharks	Seattle Kraken	
July 3, 2024	Josh Mahura	Seattle Kraken	Florida Panthers	
July 3, 2024	Haydn Fleury	Winnipeg Jets	Tampa Bay Lightning	
July 3, 2024	Mason Shaw	Winnipeg Jets	Minnesota Wild	
July 4, 2024	Jack Roslovic	Carolina Hurricanes	New York Rangers	
July 5, 2024	Jaxson Stauber	Utah Hockey Club	Chicago Blackhawks	
July 5, 2024	Jaycob Megna	Florida Panthers	Chicago Blackhawks	
July 5, 2024	Caleb Jones	Los Angeles Kings	Colorado Avalanche	
July 7, 2024	Zach Sawchenko	Columbus Blue Jackets	Vancouver Canucks	
July 9, 2024	Adam Boqvist	Florida Panthers	Columbus Blue Jackets	
July 10, 2024	Ryan Suter	St. Louis Blues	Dallas Stars	
July 10, 2024	Liam Foudy	New York Islanders	Nashville Predators	
July 20, 2024	Daniel Sprong	Vancouver Canucks	Detroit Red Wings	
August 5, 2024	Oliver Kylington	Colorado Avalanche	Calgary Flames	
August 9, 2024	Matthew Phillips	Colorado Avalanche	Washington Capitals	
August 13, 2024	Magnus Hellberg	Dallas Stars	Florida Panthers	
August 29, 2024	Nick Cousins	Ottawa Senators	Florida Panthers	
August 31, 2024	Robert Bortuzzo	Utah Hockey Club	New York Islanders	
September 5, 2024	Oscar Dansk	Anaheim Ducks	Calgary Flames	
September 10, 2024	Jarred Tinordi	Calgary Flames	Chicago Blackhawks	
September 11, 2024	Jani Hakanpaa	Toronto Maple Leafs	Dallas Stars	
September 15, 2024	James van Riemsdyk	Columbus Blue Jackets	Boston Bruins	
September 21, 2024	Kevin Lankinen	Vancouver Canucks	Nashville Predators	
September 24, 2024	Eetu Makiniemi	Philadelphia Flyers	San Jose Sharks	
October 3, 2024	Tyson Barrie	Calgary Flames	Nashville Predators	
October 4, 2024	Tanner Pearson	Vegas Golden Knights	Montreal Canadiens	
October 5, 2024	Kevin Labanc	Columbus Blue Jackets	San Jose Sharks	
October 6, 2024	Kailer Yamamoto	Utah Hockey Club	Seattle Kraken	
October 7, 2024	Steven Lorentz	Toronto Maple Leafs	Florida Panthers	
October 7, 2024	Max Pacioretty	Toronto Maple Leafs	Washington Capitals	
October 7, 2024	Austin Watson	Detroit Red Wings	Tampa Bay Lightning	
October 7, 2024	Jakub Vrana	Washington Capitals	St. Louis Blues	
October 8, 2024	Travis Dermott	Edmonton Oilers	Utah Hockey Club	
October 9, 2024	Gustav Lindstrom	Montreal Canadiens	Anaheim Ducks	
November 4, 2024	Tyler Johnson	Boston Bruins	Chicago Blackhawks	
December 2, 2024	Dustin Tokarski	Carolina Hurricanes	Buffalo Sabres	
January 17, 2025	John Klingberg	Edmonton Oilers	Toronto Maple Leafs	
January 31, 2025	Brandon Saad	Vegas Golden Knights	St. Louis Blues	
March 5, 2025	Jesse Puljujarvi	Florida Panthers	Pittsburgh Penguins	
March 25, 2025	Noah Beck	San Jose Sharks	St. Louis Blues	

=== Offer sheets ===
An offer sheet is a contract offered to a restricted free agent by a team other than the one for which his rights are owned by. If the player signs the offer sheet, his current team has seven days to match the contract offer and keep the player or else he goes to the team that gave the offer sheet, with compensation going to his originally owning team.

Date offered	Player	Offering team	Original team	Contract offered	Date resolved	Result	Compensation	Ref
August 13, 2024	Philip Broberg	St. Louis Blues	Edmonton Oilers	2 years $4,580,917	August 20, 2024	not matched	2nd-round pick in 2025	
August 13, 2024	Dylan Holloway	St. Louis Blues	Edmonton Oilers	2 years $2,290,457	August 20, 2024	not matched	3rd-round pick in 2025	

=== Imports ===
This section is for players who were not previously on contract with NHL teams in the past season. Listed is the last team and league they were under contract with.

Date	Player	New team	Previous team	League	Ref
July 1, 2024	Jakub Rychlovsky	Detroit Red Wings	HC Bili Tygri Liberec	ELH	
July 1, 2024	Connor Hughes	Montreal Canadiens	Lausanne HC	NL	
July 1, 2024	Jere Innala	Colorado Avalanche	Frolunda HC	SHL	
July 1, 2024	Rodrigo Abols	Philadelphia Flyers	Rogle BK	SHL	
July 1, 2024	Martin Frk	Calgary Flames	SC Rapperswil-Jona Lakers	NL	
July 1, 2024	Mason Jobst	Buffalo Sabres	Rochester Americans	AHL	
July 1, 2024	Cole Clayton	Columbus Blue Jackets	Cleveland Monsters	AHL	
July 1, 2024	Owen Sillinger	Columbus Blue Jackets	Cleveland Monsters	AHL	
July 1, 2024	Tobie Paquette-Bisson	Tampa Bay Lightning	Laval Rocket	AHL	
July 2, 2024	Jonathan Aspirot	Calgary Flames	Calgary Wranglers	AHL	
July 2, 2024	Cedric Pare	Toronto Maple Leafs	Colorado Eagles	AHL	
July 2, 2024	Marc Gatcomb	New York Islanders	Abbotsford Canucks	AHL	
July 3, 2024	Kieffer Bellows	Nashville Predators	Toronto Marlies	AHL	
July 4, 2024	Tory Dello	Detroit Red Wings	Chicago Wolves	AHL	
July 7, 2024	Josiah Slavin	Carolina Hurricanes	Toronto Marlies	AHL	
July 14, 2024	Joakim Ryan	Carolina Hurricanes	Malmo Redhawks	SHL	
September 23, 2024	Viliam Kmec	Vegas Golden Knights	Prince George Cougars	WHL	
October 5, 2024	Skyler Brind'Amour	Carolina Hurricanes	Charlotte Checkers	AHL	
October 7, 2024	Cameron Wright	Edmonton Oilers	Bakersfield Condors	AHL	
November 22, 2024	Alex Nylander	Toronto Maple Leafs	Toronto Marlies	AHL	
November 29, 2024	Joseph LaBate	Columbus Blue Jackets	Barys Astana	KHL	
December 12, 2024	Jacob Gaucher	Philadelphia Flyers	Lehigh Valley Phantoms	AHL	
December 15, 2024	Tye Felhaber	Colorado Avalanche	Colorado Eagles	AHL	
January 7, 2025	Dylan Ferguson	Minnesota Wild	Iowa Wild	AHL	
January 24, 2025	Tony DeAngelo	New York Islanders	SKA Saint Petersburg	KHL	
January 25, 2025	Colin White	San Jose Sharks	San Jose Barracuda	AHL	
January 27, 2025	Dominik Shine	Detroit Red Wings	Grand Rapids Griffins	AHL	
February 3, 2025	Brandon Halverson	Tampa Bay Lightning	Syracuse Crunch	AHL	
March 1, 2025	Borya Valis	Toronto Maple Leafs	Prince George Cougars	WHL	
March 2, 2025	Braeden Bowman	Vegas Golden Knights	Henderson Silver Knights	AHL	
March 2, 2025	Kai Uchacz	Vegas Golden Knights	Henderson Silver Knights	AHL	
March 4, 2025	Logan Brown	Tampa Bay Lightning	Syracuse Crunch	AHL	
March 4, 2025	Adam Scheel	Colorado Avalanche	Colorado Eagles	AHL	
March 6, 2025	Tyler Pitlick	Boston Bruins	Providence Bruins	AHL	
March 6, 2025	Evan Cormier	Florida Panthers	Charlotte Checkers	AHL	
March 6, 2025	Cameron Hebig	Utah Hockey Club	Tucson Roadrunners	AHL	
March 6, 2025	Connor Murphy	Calgary Flames	Calgary Wranglers	AHL	
March 7, 2025	Gabriel Carriere	San Jose Sharks	San Jose Barracuda	AHL	
March 13, 2025	Avery Hayes	Pittsburgh Penguins	Wilkes-Barre/Scranton Penguins	AHL	
March 14, 2025	Xavier Parent	New Jersey Devils	Utica Comets	AHL	
March 20, 2025	John Prokop	Toronto Maple Leafs	Union Garnet Chargers	ECAC	
March 21, 2025	Gleb Veremyev	New York Islanders	Colorado College Tigers	NCHC	
March 21, 2025	Eduards Tralmaks	Detroit Red Wings	Rytiri Kladno	ELH	
March 24, 2025	Owen Say	Calgary Flames	Notre Dame Fighting Irish	B1G	
March 24, 2025	Trey Taylor	Dallas Stars	Clarkson Golden Knights	ECAC	
March 24, 2025	Luke Haymes	Toronto Maple Leafs	Dartmouth Big Green	ECAC	
March 25, 2025	Jack Williams	Columbus Blue Jackets	Northeastern Huskies	HE	
March 25, 2025	Tyler Kopff	Buffalo Sabres	Brown Bears	ECAC	
March 26, 2025	Caleb MacDonald	Columbus Blue Jackets	North Dakota Fighting Hawks	NCHC	
March 26, 2025	Cooper Gay	Colorado Avalanche	St. Thomas Tommies	CCHA	
March 26, 2025	Isak Posch	Colorado Avalanche	St. Cloud State Huskies	NCHC	
March 29, 2025	Karsen Dorwart	Philadelphia Flyers	Michigan State Spartans	B1G	
March 31, 2025	Joey Larson	New York Islanders	Michigan State Spartans	B1G	
March 31, 2025	Damien Carfagna	Edmonton Oilers	Ohio State Buckeyes	B1G	
March 31, 2025	Harrison Scott	Dallas Stars	Maine Black Bears	HE	
April 1, 2025	Callum Tung	New York Rangers	UConn Huskies	HE	
April 2, 2025	Josh Samanski	Edmonton Oilers	Straubing Tigers	DEL	
April 2, 2025	David Tomasek	Edmonton Oilers	Farjestad BK	SHL	
April 3, 2025	Dalton Bancroft	Boston Bruins	Cornell Big Red	ECAC	
April 3, 2025	Anton Lundmark	Florida Panthers	Timra IK	SHL	
April 10, 2025	Blake Smith	Toronto Maple Leafs	Flint Firebirds	OHL	
April 13, 2025	Atro Leppanen	Edmonton Oilers	Vaasan Sport	Liiga	
April 13, 2025	Carter King	Calgary Flames	Denver Pioneers	NCHC	
April 14, 2025	Quinn Hutson	Edmonton Oilers	Boston University Terriers	HE	
April 14, 2025	Tim Washe	Anaheim Ducks	Western Michigan Broncos	NCHC	
April 24, 2025	Michal Kunc	Utah Hockey Club	HC Olomouc	ELH	
April 25, 2025	Riley Mercer	Minnesota Wild	Drummondville Voltigeurs	QMJHL	
May 5, 2025	Charle-Edouard D'Astous	Tampa Bay Lightning	Brynas IF	SHL	
May 19, 2025	Simon Zajicek	Boston Bruins	HC Litvinov	ELH	
May 22, 2025	Wojciech Stachowiak	Tampa Bay Lightning	ERC Ingolstadt	DEL	
May 22, 2025	Anri Ravinskis	Vancouver Canucks	HPK	Liiga	

== Trades ==
* Retained Salary Transaction: Each team is allowed up to three contracts on their payroll where they have retained salary in a trade (i.e. the player no longer plays with Team A due to a trade to Team B, but Team A still retains some salary). Only up to 50% of a player's contract can be kept, and only up to 15% of a team's salary cap can be taken up by retained salary. A contract can only be involved in one of these trades twice.

Hover over retained salary or conditional transactions for more information.

=== June ===
June 28, 2024	To Columbus Blue Jackets 4th-round pick in 2025	To St. Louis Blues Alexandre Texier
June 29, 2024	To Buffalo Sabres Beck Malenstyn	To Washington Capitals 2nd-round pick in 2024
June 29, 2024	To Tampa Bay Lightning Conor Geekie; J.J. Moser; 7th-round pick in 2024; 2nd-round pick in 2025	To Utah Hockey Club Mikhail Sergachev
June 29, 2024	To New Jersey Devils WSH 2nd-round pick in 2024; EDM 2nd-round pick in 2025	To Utah Hockey Club John Marino; COL 5th-round pick in 2024
June 29, 2024	To Los Angeles Kings Tanner Jeannot	To Tampa Bay Lightning 4th-round pick in 2024; 2nd-round pick in 2025
June 29, 2024	To Pittsburgh Penguins Kevin Hayes; 2nd-round pick in 2025	To St. Louis Blues future considerations
June 29, 2024	To Vegas Golden Knights NYI 3rd-round pick in 2024; 3rd-round pick in 2025	To Washington Capitals Logan Thompson
June 29, 2024	To Boston Bruins Vinni Lettieri; 4th-round pick in 2024	To Minnesota Wild Jakub Lauko; 4th-round pick in 2024
June 29, 2024	To New Jersey Devils Paul Cotter; 3rd-round pick in 2025	To Vegas Golden Knights Alexander Holtz; Akira Schmid
June 29, 2024	To Dallas Stars Max Ellis; 7th-round pick in 2026	To Toronto Maple Leafs Chris Tanev
June 30, 2024	To Carolina Hurricanes 3rd-round pick in 2025	To Tampa Bay Lightning Jake Guentzel
June 30, 2024	To Pittsburgh Penguins Bennett MacArthur	To Tampa Bay Lightning Lukas Svejkovsky
June 30, 2024	To Montreal Canadiens conditional DAL 4th-round pick in 2026 or NJD 4th-round pick in 2026 or WPG 4th-round pick in 2026	To New Jersey Devils Johnathan Kovacevic

==== Pick-only trades ====
June 28, 2024	To Los Angeles Kings WPG 1st-round pick in 2024 (#26 overall); COL 2nd-round pick in 2024 (#57 overall); 7th-round pick in 2024 (#198 overall)	To Montreal Canadiens 1st-round pick in 2024 (#21 overall)
June 28, 2024	To Minnesota Wild 1st-round pick in 2024 (#12 overall)	To Philadelphia Flyers 1st-round pick in 2024 (#13 overall); 3rd-round pick in 2025
June 28, 2024	To Anaheim Ducks 1st-round pick in 2024 (#23 overall)	To Toronto Maple Leafs EDM 1st-round pick in 2024 (#31 overall); BOS 2nd-round pick in 2024 (#58 overall)
June 28, 2024	To Colorado Avalanche 2nd-round pick in 2024 (#38 overall); 2nd-round pick in 2024 (#71 overall); NYR 2nd-round pick in 2025	To Utah Hockey Club 1st-round pick in 2024 (#24 overall)
June 28, 2024	To Carolina Hurricanes 2nd-round pick in 2024 (#34 overall); NYI 2nd-round pick in 2024 (#50 overall)	To Chicago Blackhawks 1st-round pick in 2024 (#27 overall)
June 28, 2024	To Edmonton Oilers FLA 1st-round pick in 2024 (#32 overall)	To Philadelphia Flyers conditional 1st-round pick in 2025 or 1st-round pick in 2026
June 29, 2024	To Florida Panthers BOS 2nd-round pick in 2024 (#58 overall)	To Toronto Maple Leafs 7th-round pick in 2024 (#225 overall); 2nd-round pick in 2025
June 29, 2024	To Nashville Predators 3rd-round pick in 2024 (#77 overall); 3rd-round pick in 2025	To Philadelphia Flyers WPG 2nd-round pick in 2024 (#59 overall)
June 29, 2024	To Carolina Hurricanes 3rd-round pick in 2024 (#69 overall); 5th-round pick in 2024 (#133 overall)	To Columbus Blue Jackets 2nd-round pick in 2024 (#60 overall)
June 29, 2024	To Buffalo Sabres UTA 3rd-round pick in 2024 (#71 overall)	To Colorado Avalanche 3rd-round pick in 2024 (#76 overall); FLA 5th-round pick in 2024 (#161 overall)
June 29, 2024	To New Jersey Devils 3rd-round pick in 2024 (#82 overall); 5th-round pick in 2024 (#146 overall)	To Washington Capitals 3rd-round pick in 2024 (#75 overall)
June 29, 2024	To New Jersey Devils TBL 3rd-round pick in 2024 (#85 overall); 6th-round pick in 2025	To San Jose Sharks WSH 3rd-round pick in 2024 (#82 overall)
June 29, 2024	To Carolina Hurricanes 3rd-round pick in 2025	To Chicago Blackhawks 3rd-round pick in 2024 (#92 overall)
June 29, 2024	To Calgary Flames LAK 5th-round pick in 2024 (#150 overall); STL 6th-round pick in 2024 (#177 overall)	To Philadelphia Flyers NJD 4th-round pick in 2024 (#107 overall)
June 29, 2024	To Buffalo Sabres 4th-round pick in 2024 (#123 overall); 7th-round pick in 2024 (#219 overall)	To Winnipeg Jets PHI 4th-round pick in 2024 (#109 overall)
June 29, 2024	To Nashville Predators 4th-round pick in 2024 (#127 overall); 7th-round pick in 2026	To New York Rangers 4th-round pick in 2024 (#119 overall)
June 29, 2024	To Florida Panthers 6th-round pick in 2024 (#169 overall); 7th-round pick in 2024 (#207 overall)	To Seattle Kraken PHI 5th-round pick in 2024 (#141 overall)
June 29, 2024	To Anaheim Ducks 6th-round pick in 2024 (#182 overall); 7th-round pick in 2024 (#214 overall)	To Los Angeles Kings 6th-round pick in 2024 (#164 overall)
June 29, 2024	To Vegas Golden Knights 6th-round pick in 2025	To Washington Capitals 7th-round pick in 2024 (#212 overall)

=== July ===
July 1, 2024	To Ottawa Senators Nick Jensen; 3rd-round pick in 2026	To Washington Capitals Jakob Chychrun
July 1, 2024	To New York Rangers Reilly Smith*	To Pittsburgh Penguins conditional MIN 5th-round pick in 2025 or NYR 5th-round pick in 2025; 2nd-round pick in 2027
July 2, 2024	To Ottawa Senators future considerations	To St. Louis Blues Mathieu Joseph; 3rd-round pick in 2025
July 2, 2024	To Dallas Stars future considerations	To St. Louis Blues Radek Faksa
July 2, 2024	To Anaheim Ducks Brian Dumoulin	To Seattle Kraken 4th-round pick in 2026
July 3, 2024	To Ottawa Senators Jan Jenik	To Utah Hockey Club Egor Sokolov
July 3, 2024	To Anaheim Ducks Robby Fabbri conditional BOS 4th-round pick in 2025 or DET 4th-round pick in 2025	To Detroit Red Wings Gage Alexander
July 5, 2024	To Buffalo Sabres Ryan McLeod; Tyler Tullio	To Edmonton Oilers Matthew Savoie
July 6, 2024	To Carolina Hurricanes future considerations	To Winnipeg Jets Dylan Coghlan
July 15, 2024	To Edmonton Oilers Roby Jarventie; 4th-round pick in 2025	To Ottawa Senators Xavier Bourgault; Jake Chiasson
July 15, 2024	To Colorado Avalanche Kevin Mandolese; 7th-round pick in 2026	To Ottawa Senators 6th-round pick in 2026

=== August ===
August 13, 2024	To Nashville Predators Jordan Frasca	To Pittsburgh Penguins Cody Glass; MIN 3rd-round pick in 2025; 6th-round pick in 2026
August 18, 2024	To Edmonton Oilers Vasily Podkolzin	To Vancouver Canucks OTT 4th-round pick in 2025
August 18, 2024	To Edmonton Oilers Ty Emberson	To San Jose Sharks Cody Ceci; 3rd-round pick in 2025
August 19, 2024	To Columbus Blue Jackets Jordan Harris	To Montreal Canadiens Patrik Laine; 2nd-round pick in 2026
August 20, 2024	To Edmonton Oilers Paul Fischer; 3rd-round pick in 2028	To St. Louis Blues future considerations
August 22, 2024	To Pittsburgh Penguins Rutger McGroarty	To Winnipeg Jets Brayden Yager
August 23, 2024	To Nashville Predators Magnus Chrona; David Edstrom conditional SJS 1st-round pick in 2025 or VGK 1st-round pick in 2025	To San Jose Sharks Yaroslav Askarov; Nolan Burke; COL 3rd-round pick in 2025

==== Pick-only trades ====
August 13, 2024	To Pittsburgh Penguins 2nd-round pick in 2026; OTT 3rd-round pick in 2025	To St. Louis Blues STL 2nd-round pick in 2025; 5th-round pick in 2026

=== October ===
October 6, 2024	To Colorado Avalanche Tucker Poolman*; 4th-round pick in 2025	To Vancouver Canucks Erik Brannstrom
October 29, 2024	To Detroit Red Wings NYR 3rd-round pick in 2025	To Utah Hockey Club Olli Maatta
October 30, 2024	To San Jose Sharks Timothy Liljegren	To Toronto Maple Leafs Matt Benning conditional EDM 3rd-round pick in 2025 or COL 3rd-round pick in 2025; 6th-round pick in 2026

=== November ===
November 4, 2024	To Edmonton Oilers Ronnie Attard	To Philadelphia Flyers Ben Gleason
November 8, 2024	To Seattle Kraken Daniel Sprong	To Vancouver Canucks future considerations
November 12, 2024	To Pittsburgh Penguins CHI 5th-round pick in 2025; 3rd-round pick in 2027	To Washington Capitals Lars Eller
November 25, 2024	To Nashville Predators NYR 4th-round pick in 2027	To Pittsburgh Penguins Philip Tomasino
November 27, 2024	To Chicago Blackhawks future considerations	To Nashville Predators Ryder Rolston
November 30, 2024	To Colorado Avalanche Scott Wedgewood	To Nashville Predators Justus Annunen; 6th-round pick in 2025
November 30, 2024	To Columbus Blue Jackets Daemon Hunt conditional 1st-round pick in 2025 or 1st-round pick in 2026; COL 3rd-round pick in 2026; TOR 4th-round pick in 2026; 2nd-round pick in 2027	To Minnesota Wild David Jiricek; 5th-round pick in 2025

=== December ===
December 6, 2024	To Edmonton Oilers Jacob Perreault	To Montreal Canadiens Noel Hoefenmayer
December 6, 2024	To Anaheim Ducks Jacob Trouba	To New York Rangers Urho Vaakanainen conditional ANA 4th-round pick in 2025 or BOS 4th-round pick in 2025 or DET 4th-round pick in 2025
December 9, 2024	To Colorado Avalanche Mackenzie Blackwood; Givani Smith; 5th-round pick in 2027	To San Jose Sharks Alexandar Georgiev*; Nikolai Kovalenko conditional COL's 4th-round pick in 2025 or VAN 4th-round pick in 2025 or 5th-round pick in 2025; 2nd-round pick in 2026
December 14, 2024	To Anaheim Ducks Jeremie Biakabutuka; 2nd-round pick in 2027	To St. Louis Blues Cam Fowler*; 4th-round pick in 2027
December 18, 2024	To New York Rangers Will Borgen; 3rd-round pick in 2025; 6th-round pick in 2025	To Seattle Kraken Kaapo Kakko
December 18, 2024	To Pittsburgh Penguins P.O Joseph	To St. Louis Blues future considerations
December 18, 2024	To Montreal Canadiens Alexandre Carrier	To Nashville Predators Justin Barron
December 28, 2024	To Colorado Avalanche Juuso Parssinen; NYR 7th-round pick in 2026	To Nashville Predators Ondrej Pavel; 3rd-round pick in 2027

=== January ===
January 3, 2025	To Buffalo Sabres Bennett MacArthur	To Pittsburgh Penguins Colton Poolman
January 15, 2025	To Chicago Blackhawks Dmitry Kuzmin	To Winnipeg Jets Isaak Phillips
January 22, 2025	To Anaheim Ducks Justin Bailey	To San Jose Sharks Pavol Regenda
January 24, 2025	To Chicago Blackhawks Mikko Rantanen	To Colorado Avalanche Nils Juntorp
January 24, 2025	To Carolina Hurricanes Taylor Hall; Mikko Rantanen*	To Chicago Blackhawks CHI 3rd-round pick in 2025
January 24, 2025	To Carolina Hurricanes Nils Juntorp	To Colorado Avalanche Jack Drury; Martin Necas; 2nd-round pick in 2025; 4th-round pick in 2026
January 25, 2025	To New York Rangers Lucas Edmonds	To Tampa Bay Lightning Ryder Korczak
January 27, 2025	To New York Islanders Scott Perunovich	To St. Louis Blues conditional 5th-round pick in 2026
January 30, 2025	To Calgary Flames Joel Farabee; Morgan Frost	To Philadelphia Flyers Andrei Kuzmenko; Jakob Pelletier; 2nd-round pick in 2025; 7th-round pick in 2028
January 31, 2025	To New York Rangers Erik Brannstrom; Jackson Dorrington; JT Miller	To Vancouver Canucks Filip Chytil; Victor Mancini conditional 1st-round pick in 2025 or 1st-round pick in 2026
January 31, 2025	To Pittsburgh Penguins Vincent Desharnais; Melvin Fernstrom; Danton Heinen conditional NYR 1st-round pick in 2025 or NYR 1st-round pick in 2026	To Vancouver Canucks Drew O'Connor; Marcus Pettersson

=== February ===
February 1, 2025	To Dallas Stars Cody Ceci; Mikael Granlund	To San Jose Sharks 1st-round pick in 2025 conditional 3rd-round pick in 2025 or WPG 4th-round pick in 2025
February 3, 2025	To Minnesota Wild future considerations	To Utah Hockey Club Sammy Walker
February 7, 2025	To Nashville Predators Mark Friedman	To Vancouver Canucks future considerations
February 13, 2025	To Pittsburgh Penguins Mathias Laferriere	To St. Louis Blues Corey Andonovski
February 18, 2025	To Nashville Predators Grigori Denisenko	To Vegas Golden Knights future considerations
February 24, 2025	To Anaheim Ducks Ville Husso	To Detroit Red Wings future considerations
February 26, 2025	To Nashville Predators Jesse Ylonen	To Tampa Bay Lightning Anthony Angello
February 26, 2025	To Los Angeles Kings Joseph Cecconi	To Minnesota Wild Tyler Madden

=== March ===
March 1, 2025	To Colorado Avalanche Hank Kempf; Ryan Lindgren*; Jimmy Vesey	To New York Rangers Calvin de Haan; Juuso Parssinen conditional CAR 2nd-round pick in 2025 or NYR 2nd-round pick in 2025 conditional COL 4th-round pick in 2025 or VAN 4th-round pick in 2025
March 1, 2025	To Minnesota Wild Gustav Nyquist*	To Nashville Predators 2nd-round pick in 2026
March 1, 2025	To Chicago Blackhawks Spencer Knight conditional 1st-round pick in 2026 or 1st-round pick in 2027	To Florida Panthers Seth Jones*; 4th-round pick in 2026
March 4, 2025	To Boston Bruins Petr Hauser	To New Jersey Devils Trent Frederic*
March 4, 2025	To Edmonton Oilers Trent Frederic*	To New Jersey Devils Shane Lachance
March 4, 2025	To Boston Bruins Max Wanner; STL 2nd-round pick in 2025; 4th-round pick in 2026	To Edmonton Oilers Petr Hauser; Max Jones
March 5, 2025	To Florida Panthers Vitek Vanecek	To San Jose Sharks Patrick Giles
March 5, 2025	To Detroit Red Wings Yanni Gourde*	To Seattle Kraken Kyle Aucoin
March 5, 2025	To Detroit Red Wings conditional EDM 4th-round pick in 2025 or TBL 4th-round pick in 2025	To Tampa Bay Lightning Yanni Gourde*
March 5, 2025	To Seattle Kraken Mikey Eyssimont; TOR 2nd-round pick in 2025 conditional 1st-round pick in 2026 or 1st-round pick in 2028 conditional 1st-round pick in 2027 or 1st-round pick in 2028 or 1st-round pick in 2029 conditional 3rd-round pick in 2028 conditional 3rd-round pick in 2029	To Tampa Bay Lightning Kyle Aucoin; Oliver Bjorkstrand; 5th-round pick in 2026
March 5, 2025	To Pittsburgh Penguins 5th-round pick in 2028	To San Jose Sharks Vincent Desharnais
March 5, 2025	To Nashville Predators Michael Bunting; 4th-round pick in 2026	To Pittsburgh Penguins Tommy Novak; Luke Schenn
March 6, 2025	To Anaheim Ducks Herman Traff conditional EDM 2nd-round pick in 2025 or WPG 2nd-round pick in 2025	To New Jersey Devils Brian Dumoulin*
March 6, 2025	To Florida Panthers Nico Sturm; 7th-round pick in 2027	To San Jose Sharks 4th-round pick in 2026
March 6, 2025	To Florida Panthers Kaapo Kahkonen	To Winnipeg Jets Chris Driedger
March 6, 2025	To New York Rangers Brendan Brisson; SJS 3rd-round pick in 2025	To Vegas Golden Knights Reilly Smith*
March 6, 2025	To New York Rangers Carson Soucy	To Vancouver Canucks SJS 3rd-round pick in 2025
March 6, 2025	To Boston Bruins Marat Khusnutdinov; Jakub Lauko; BOS 6th-round pick in 2026	To Minnesota Wild Justin Brazeau
March 6, 2025	To Colorado Avalanche William Dufour; Brock Nelson*	To New York Islanders Oliver Kylington; Calum Ritchie conditional 1st-round pick in 2026 or 1st-round pick in 2027 conditional 3rd-round pick in 2028
March 7, 2025	To Anaheim Ducks Oliver Kylington	To New York Islanders future considerations
March 7, 2025	To Edmonton Oilers Jake Walman	To San Jose Sharks Carl Berglund conditional 1st-round pick in 2026 or 1st-round pick in 2027
March 7, 2025	To Pittsburgh Penguins 2nd-round pick in 2025	To Washington Capitals Anthony Beauvillier
March 7, 2025	To Los Angeles Kings Andrei Kuzmenko*; 7th-round pick in 2025	To Philadelphia Flyers 3rd-round pick in 2027
March 7, 2025	To Buffalo Sabres Jacob Bernard-Docker; Josh Norris	To Ottawa Senators Dylan Cozens; Dennis Gilbert; 2nd-round pick in 2026
March 7, 2025	To Pittsburgh Penguins 2nd-round pick in 2026; 4th-round pick in 2027	To Winnipeg Jets Luke Schenn
March 7, 2025	To Seattle Kraken 2nd-round pick in 2027	To Winnipeg Jets Brandon Tanev
March 7, 2025	To Philadelphia Flyers Nikita Grebenkin conditional 1st-round pick in 2027 or 1st-round pick in 2028	To Toronto Maple Leafs Scott Laughton*; 4th-round pick in 2025; 6th-round pick in 2027
March 7, 2025	To Carolina Hurricanes Logan Stankoven conditional 1st-round pick in 2026 or 1st-round pick in 2027; 3rd-round pick in 2026; 3rd-round pick in 2027 conditional 1st-round pick in 2028 or 1st-round pick in 2029	To Dallas Stars Mikko Rantanen
March 7, 2025	To Boston Bruins Casey Mittelstadt; Will Zellers conditional CAR 2nd-round pick in 2025 or NYR 2nd-round pick in 2025	To Colorado Avalanche Charlie Coyle; 5th-round pick in 2026
March 7, 2025	To Chicago Blackhawks Joe Veleno	To Detroit Red Wings Petr Mrazek; Craig Smith
March 7, 2025	To Columbus Blue Jackets Luke Kunin	To San Jose Sharks STL 4th-round pick in 2025
March 7, 2025	To Chicago Blackhawks Aku Raty; Victor Soderstrom; Shea Weber	To Utah Hockey Club 5th-round pick in 2026
March 7, 2025	To Ottawa Senators Tristen Robins; Fabian Zetterlund; 4th-round pick in 2025	To San Jose Sharks Noah Gregor; Zack Ostapchuk; 2nd-round pick in 2025
March 7, 2025	To Colorado Avalanche Erik Johnson	To Philadelphia Flyers Givani Smith
March 7, 2025	To Buffalo Sabres Erik Brannstrom	To New York Rangers Nicolas Aube-Kubel
March 7, 2025	To New Jersey Devils Dennis Cholowski	To New York Islanders Adam Beckman
March 7, 2025	To Boston Bruins conditional 1st-round pick in 2027 or 2nd-round pick in 2027 or 1st-round pick in 2028	To Florida Panthers Brad Marchand*
March 7, 2025	To New Jersey Devils Cody Glass; Jonathan Gruden	To Pittsburgh Penguins Max Graham; Chase Stillman; 3rd-round pick in 2027
March 7, 2025	To Carolina Hurricanes Mark Jankowski	To Nashville Predators 5th-round pick in 2026
March 7, 2025	To New Jersey Devils Daniel Sprong	To Seattle Kraken 7th-round pick in 2026
March 7, 2025	To Boston Bruins Henri Jokiharju	To Buffalo Sabres EDM 4th-round pick in 2026
March 7, 2025	To Boston Bruins Daniil Misyul	To New Jersey Devils Marc McLaughlin
March 7, 2025	To Pittsburgh Penguins Connor Dewar; Conor Timmins	To Toronto Maple Leafs 5th-round pick in 2025
March 7, 2025	To Boston Bruins Fraser Minten; PHI 4th-round pick in 2025 conditional 1st-round pick in 2026 or 1st-round pick in 2027 or 1st-round pick in 2028	To Toronto Maple Leafs Brandon Carlo*
March 7, 2025	To Minnesota Wild future considerations	To Toronto Maple Leafs Reese Johnson
March 14, 2025	To Detroit Red Wings future considerations	To New Jersey Devils Tory Dello
March 30, 2025	To Carolina Hurricanes 6th-round pick in 2025	To Tampa Bay Lightning Lucas Mercuri

=== June (2025) ===
June 12, 2025	To Anaheim Ducks Chris Kreider; ANA 4th-round pick in 2025	To New York Rangers Carey Terrance; TOR 3rd-round pick in 2025
June 13, 2025	To Boston Bruins Victor Soderstrom	To Chicago Blackhawks Ryan Mast; 7th-round pick in 2025
June 18, 2025	To Nashville Predators Erik Haula	To New Jersey Devils Jeremy Hanzel; 4th-round pick in 2025
June 19, 2025	To Dallas Stars DAL 4th-round pick in 2025; 3rd-round pick in 2026	To Seattle Kraken Mason Marchment
June 21, 2025	To Chicago Blackhawks Andre Burakovsky	To Seattle Kraken Joe Veleno
June 23, 2025	To Anaheim Ducks Ryan Poehling; CBJ 2nd-round pick in 2025; 4th-round pick in 2026	To Philadelphia Flyers Trevor Zegras
June 25, 2025	To Edmonton Oilers OTT 4th-round pick in 2025	To Vancouver Canucks Evander Kane
June 25, 2025	To Buffalo Sabres Josh Doan; Michael Kesselring	To Utah Mammoth JJ Peterka
June 26, 2025	To Minnesota Wild 4th-round pick in 2025	To Seattle Kraken Frederick Gaudreau
June 26, 2025	To Columbus Blue Jackets 5th-round pick in 2025	To Florida Panthers Daniil Tarasov
June 26, 2025	To Columbus Blue Jackets Brendan Gaunce	To Minnesota Wild Cameron Butler
June 26, 2025	To Florida Panthers 2nd-round pick in 2026; 6th-round pick in 2027	To Washington Capitals Justin Sourdif

== Waivers ==
Once an NHL player has played in a certain number of games or a set number of seasons has passed since the signing of his first NHL contract (see here), that player must be offered to all of the other NHL teams before he can be assigned to a minor league affiliate.

Date	Player	New team	Previous team	Ref
October 2, 2024	Jiri Patera	Boston Bruins	Vancouver Canucks	
October 5, 2024	John Ludvig	Colorado Avalanche	Pittsburgh Penguins	
October 7, 2024	Zach Aston-Reese	Columbus Blue Jackets	Vegas Golden Knights	
October 7, 2024	Raphael Lavoie	Vegas Golden Knights	Edmonton Oilers	
October 7, 2024	Jiri Patera	Vancouver Canucks	Boston Bruins	
October 7, 2024	James Reimer	Anaheim Ducks	Buffalo Sabres	
October 7, 2024	Cole Schwindt	Vegas Golden Knights	Calgary Flames	
October 9, 2024	Raphael Lavoie	Edmonton Oilers	Vegas Golden Knights	
October 11, 2024	Kaapo Kahkonen	Colorado Avalanche	Winnipeg Jets	
October 11, 2024	Raphael Lavoie	Vegas Golden Knights	Edmonton Oilers	
November 10, 2024	Dante Fabbro	Columbus Blue Jackets	Nashville Predators	
November 12, 2024	Kaapo Kahkonen	Winnipeg Jets	Colorado Avalanche	
November 13, 2024	James Reimer	Buffalo Sabres	Anaheim Ducks	
November 19, 2024	Kasperi Kapanen	Edmonton Oilers	St. Louis Blues	
December 11, 2024	Alec Regula	Edmonton Oilers	Boston Bruins	
December 12, 2024	Dakota Mermis	Utah Hockey Club	Toronto Maple Leafs	
December 13, 2024	Travis Dermott	Minnesota Wild	Edmonton Oilers	
December 14, 2024	Oliver Wahlstrom	Boston Bruins	New York Islanders	
January 3, 2025	Dakota Mermis	Toronto Maple Leafs	Utah Hockey Club	
January 5, 2025	Nick DeSimone	Utah Hockey Club	New Jersey Devils	
January 6, 2025	Arthur Kaliyev	New York Rangers	Los Angeles Kings	
January 22, 2025	Walker Duehr	San Jose Sharks	Calgary Flames	
January 31, 2025	Adam Boqvist	New York Islanders	Florida Panthers	
February 5, 2025	Vinnie Hinostroza	Minnesota Wild	Nashville Predators	
February 9, 2025	Vladislav Kolyachonok	Pittsburgh Penguins	Utah Hockey Club	
February 10, 2025	Andreas Englund	Nashville Predators	Los Angeles Kings	
February 26, 2025	Travis Dermott	Edmonton Oilers	Minnesota Wild	
March 6, 2025	Christian Fischer	Columbus Blue Jackets	Detroit Red Wings	
March 6, 2025	Jordan Oesterle	Nashville Predators	Boston Bruins	
March 6, 2025	Jakub Vrana	Nashville Predators	Washington Capitals	

== See also ==
- 2024 NHL entry draft
- 2025 NHL entry draft
- 2024 in ice hockey
- 2025 in ice hockey
- 2023–24 NHL transactions
- 2025–26 NHL transactions
