= Melvin Fernström =

Swedish ice hockey player (born 2006)

Melvin Fernstrom
- Born: 28 February 2006 (age 20) Bålsta, Sweden
- Height: 6 ft 1 in (185 cm)
- Weight: 185 lb (84 kg; 13 st 3 lb)
- Position: Right wing
- Shoots: Right
- NHL team (P) Cur. team Former teams: Pittsburgh Penguins; WBS Penguins (AHL); Örebro HK
- NHL draft: 93rd overall, 2024; Vancouver Canucks
- Playing career: 2022–present

Melvin Fernström (born 28 February 2006) is a Swedish professional ice hockey player who is a right winger for the Wilkes-Barre/Scranton Penguins of the American Hockey League (AHL) while under contract as a prospect to the Pittsburgh Penguins of the National Hockey League (NHL). He was drafted 93rd overall by the Vancouver Canucks in the 2024 NHL entry draft.

== Playing career ==
In the 2023–24 season, playing for Örebro HK's junior team in the J20 Nationell, Fernström had 31 goals in 45 games. He was third in league scoring, ranking first for under-18 players. Following the season, he was selected 93rd overall by the Vancouver Canucks in the 2024 NHL entry draft.

He made his Swedish Hockey League (SHL) debut in the 2023–24 season for Örebro HK, playing six regular season games and three playoff games, playing alongside fellow Canucks prospects Jonathan Lekkerimäki and Elias Pettersson.

On 31 January 2025, Fernström's NHL signing rights were traded to the Pittsburgh Penguins along with a conditional 2025 first-round pick, forward Danton Heinen and defenceman Vincent Desharnais in exchange for defenceman Marcus Pettersson and forward Drew O'Connor. On 14 June 2025, Fernström was signed to a three-year, entry-level contract with the Penguins, however would continue his development with Örebro HK on loan for the 2025–26 season.

Fernström was unable to replicate his previous seasons offensive contributions with Örebro, totalling just 3 goals and 4 points through 36 regular season appearances. On 5 February 2026, Fernström left Örebro after he was reassigned by the Penguins to join AHL affiliate, the Wilkes-Barre/Scranton Penguins, for the remainder of the season.

== International play ==
Medal record

Representing Sweden

Men's ice hockey

World U18 Championships
Bronze medal – third place	2024 Finland	

Fernström was Sweden's leading scorer at the 2024 IIHF World U18 Championships, winning a bronze medal.

== Career statistics ==
=== Regular season and playoffs ===
			Regular season					Playoffs
Season	Team	League	GP	G	A	Pts	PIM	GP	G	A	Pts	PIM
2022–23	Örebro HK	J20	9	0	1	1	2	1	0	0	0	0
2023–24	Örebro HK	J20	45	31	32	63	28	8	5	5	10	0
2023–24	Örebro HK	SHL	6	0	0	0	0	3	0	0	0	25
2024–25	Örebro HK	J20	12	11	7	18	4	4	3	4	7	2
2024–25	Örebro HK	SHL	48	8	9	17	4	3	0	0	0	0
2025–26	Örebro HK	SHL	36	3	1	4	6	—	—	—	—	—
2025–26	Wilkes-Barre/Scranton Penguins	AHL	14	2	6	8	0	—	—	—	—	—
SHL totals			90	11	10	21	10	6	0	0	0	25
AHL totals			14	2	6	8	0	—	—	—	—	—

=== International ===
Year	Team	Event	Result	GP	G	A	Pts	PIM
2022	Sweden	U17	5th	6	1	2	3	4
2023	Sweden	HG18	5th	4	3	2	5	4
2024	Sweden	U18	3rd place, bronze medalist(s)	7	3	5	8	6
Junior totals				17	7	9	16	14
