= Danton Heinen =

Canadian ice hockey player (born 1995)

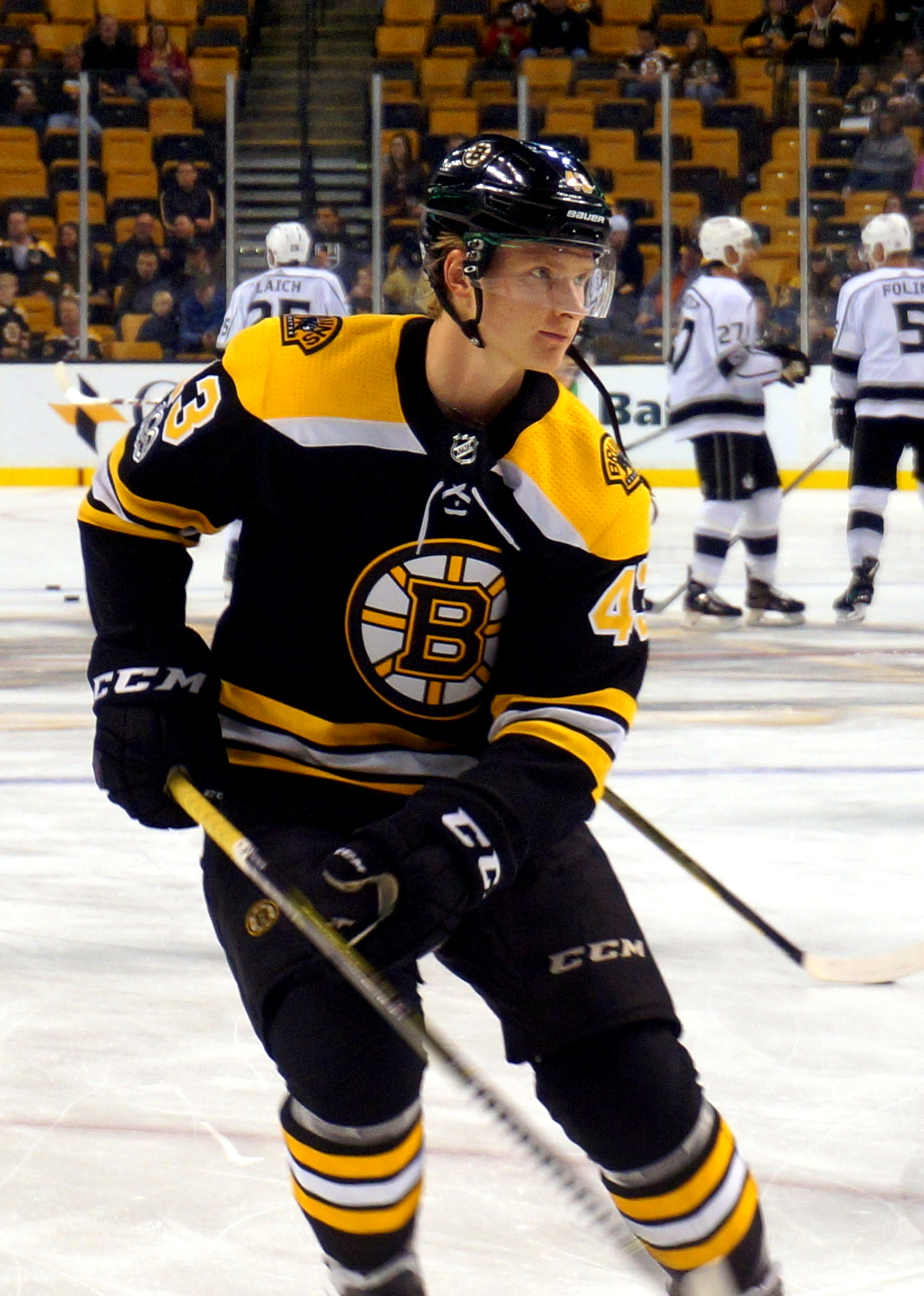
- Heinen with the Boston Bruins in 2017
- Born: July 5, 1995 (age 31) Langley, British Columbia, Canada
- Height: 6 ft 1 in (185 cm)
- Weight: 188 lb (85 kg; 13 st 6 lb)
- Position: Left wing
- Shoots: Left
- NHL team (P) Cur. team Former teams: Columbus Blue Jackets; Cleveland Monsters (AHL); Boston Bruins; Anaheim Ducks; Pittsburgh Penguins; Vancouver Canucks
- NHL draft: 116th overall, 2014; Boston Bruins
- Playing career: 2016–present

Danton Heinen (born July 5, 1995) is a Canadian professional ice hockey player who is a left winger for the Cleveland Monsters of the American Hockey League (AHL) while under contract to the Columbus Blue Jackets of the National Hockey League (NHL). He was selected by the Boston Bruins in the fourth round, 116th overall, of the 2014 NHL entry draft.

Growing up in Langley, British Columbia, Heinen played with the Richmond Sockeyes in the Pacific Junior Hockey League and junior ice hockey in the British Columbia Hockey League (BCHL) for the Merritt Centennials and Surrey Eagles. After graduating from high school, Heinen earned a scholarship to play for the Denver Pioneers men's ice hockey team. During his short collegiate career, Heinen earned NCHC Rookie of the Year in the 2014–15 season and NCHC Forward of the Year in the 2015–16 season. He concluded his amateur career in 2016 by signing an entry-level contract with the Bruins.

Following college, Heinen joined the Boston Bruins' American Hockey League (AHL) affiliate, the Providence Bruins. He spent his first three seasons moving between the AHL and NHL levels before becoming a mainstay on the Bruins' lineup during the 2018–19 season. On February 24, 2020, while in his fourth season with the Bruins, Heinen was dealt to the Anaheim Ducks in exchange for Nick Ritchie. After playing one season with the Ducks, Heinen signed a one-year contract with the Pittsburgh Penguins, subsequently signing an extension the following offseason. He returned to the Bruins the following season, before signing a two-year contract with the Vancouver Canucks; however, during his first season in Vancouver, he was traded back to Pittsburgh. Midway through the following season, Pittsburgh traded him to Columbus.

== Early life ==
Heinen was born on July 5, 1995, in Langley, British Columbia, to parents Rick and Veronica. His father is of Dutch heritage while his mother immigrated to Canada from Brazil. Heinen is the middle child of four siblings; his sister Olivia played volleyball in high school while his older brother Cody played hockey.

== Playing career ==
=== Early career ===
Growing up in Langley, British Columbia, Heinen played with the Richmond Sockeyes in the Pacific Junior Hockey League and junior hockey in the British Columbia Hockey League (BCHL) for the Merritt Centennials and Surrey Eagles. While with the Sockeyes in the 2012–13 season, he recorded 63 points as he led the team to the Pacific Junior Hockey League championship title. In his only BCHL season, Heinen led the Eagles in scoring with 62 points in 57 games and won the junior A league's Rookie of the Year Award. After graduating from Langley Christian High School in 2013, Heinen earned a scholarship to attend and play for the University of Denver. Prior to joining the Denver Pioneers men's ice hockey team for the 2014–15 season, Heinen was drafted in the fourth round, 116th overall, by the Boston Bruins at the 2014 NHL entry draft.

=== Collegiate ===
Heinen played for the Denver Pioneers from 2014 to 2016. In his freshman season with the Pioneers, Heinen scored 45 points, 16 goals, and 29 assists, in 40 games. During the month of February, Heinen registered 15 points in seven games to win the HCA National Rookie of the Month for February. In March, Heinen was then named to the Second-Team All-Conference and named a finalist for the NCHC Rookie of the Year award.

Heinen returned to the Pioneers for his sophomore season where he increased his point production with a career-high 48 points. During the season, he recorded six points in two games to help the Pioneers reach their first Frozen Four since 2005. As a result, he was named the inaugural recipient of the ASN Player of the Year Award and earned First-Team All-NCHC Honors. He was also named NCHC Forward of the Year and selected as a finalist for NCHC Player of the Year. Prior to the conclusion of his sophomore season, Heinen decided to forgo his junior and senior seasons to sign a three-year entry-level contract with the Boston Bruins.

=== Boston Bruins ===
Upon concluding his collegiate career, Heinen joined the Bruins' American Hockey League (AHL) affiliate, the Providence Bruins, to complete the 2015–16 season. He played in four games with the Bruins, two regular season and two playoff games, where he recorded two assists.

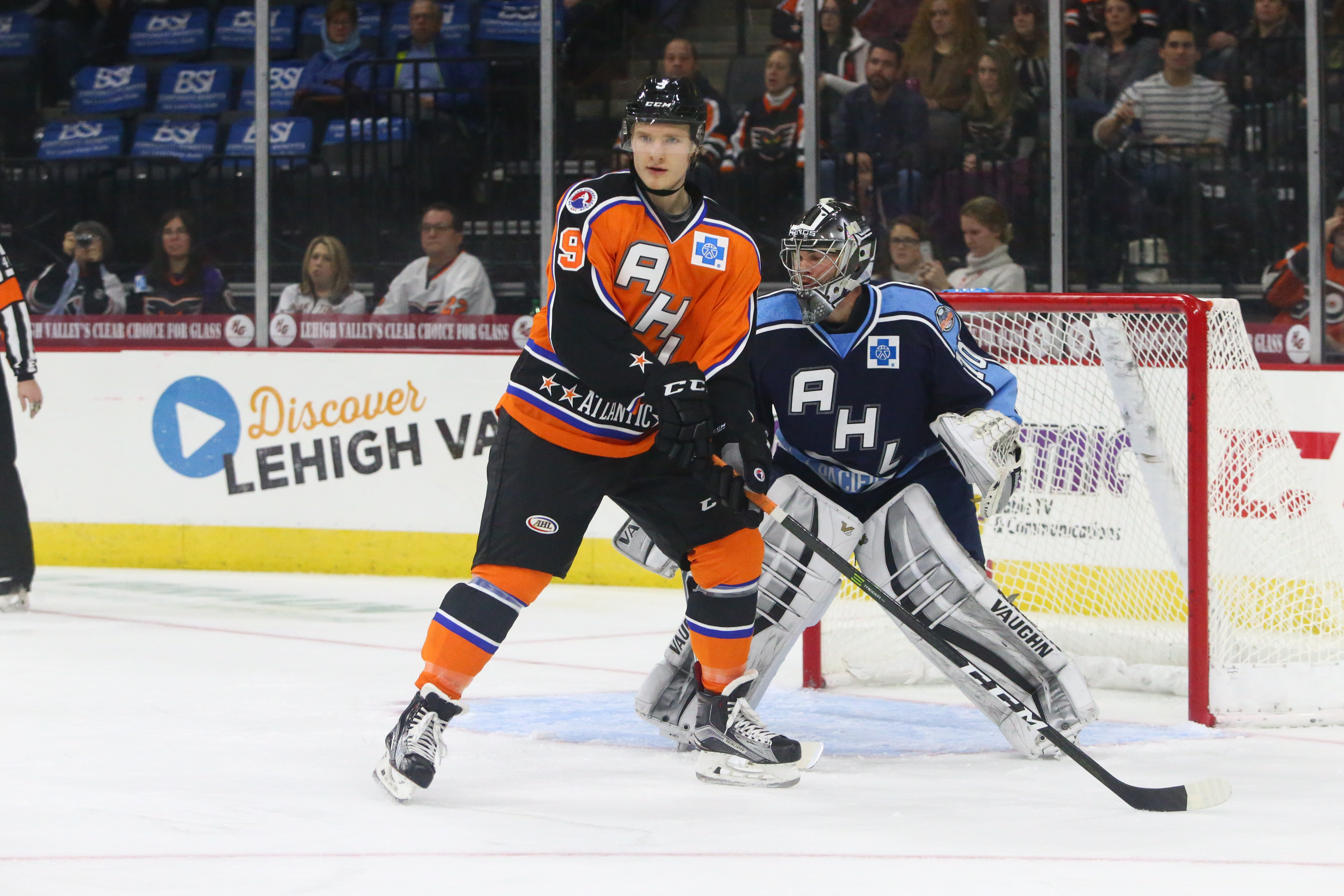
Heinen during the 2017 AHL All-Star Game

Prior to the 2016–17 season, Heinen participated in the Bruins training camp before being named to their opening night roster and making his NHL debut against the Columbus Blue Jackets. His time in the NHL was shortlived as he was re-assigned to the Providence Bruins on November 2, 2016, after playing in seven games. Heinen recorded seven goals and six assists for 13 points in 13 games before re-joining the Bruins at the NHL level on December 10, 2016. Following another assignment to the AHL, Heinen was selected for the 2017 AHL All-Star Game and helped the Providence Bruins qualify for the 2017 Calder Cup playoffs. He helped the team advance to the Eastern Conference Finals against the Syracuse Crunch by recording 18 points in 17 games.

Following his first full professional season, Heinen was again invited to participate in the Bruins' prospect training and development camp. However, he was returned to the AHL before opening night of the 2017–18 season. He played three games with the Providence Bruins, recording three assists, before being recalled on October 26, 2017. That night, he scored his first two NHL goals in a 2–1 win over the San Jose Sharks. By December, Heinen was playing alongside Riley Nash and David Backes on a third line head coach Bruce Cassidy described as having a "200-foot game". Between November 29 and January 7, the Bruins' third line combined for 46 points, 18 goals and 28 assists, through 18 games. He eventually became one of six rookies on the Bruins to play in at least 30 games as they clinched a playoff position. At the conclusion of the regular season, he placed fifth on the Bruins in scoring with 16 goals and 31 assists for 47 points.

Heinen made his NHL playoff debut during Game 1 of the 2018 Stanley Cup playoffs against the Toronto Maple Leafs. He was scratched for Game 6 by coach Cassidy in favor of playing Tommy Wingels on the second line next to David Krejci but was inserted in the following game. Upon beating the Maple Leafs, Heinen started on the Bruins' first line against Steven Stamkos of the Tampa Bay Lightning during Game 1. The Lightning eventually eliminated the Bruins from the playoffs in five games.

Following his first lengthy time in the NHL, Heinen returned to the Bruins roster for the entirety of the 2018–19 season. Although he remained at the NHL level, Heinen was pulled in and out of the lineup and experienced two separate 11 game pointless streaks. He was also a healthy scratch at various times during the season including October and February. When he was placed on the ice, Heinen moved throughout the Bruins lineup including time on the top line with Brad Marchand and Patrice Bergeron and left wing on the third line. He finished the regular season with 11 goals and 23 assists for 34 points as the Bruins qualified for the 2019 Stanley Cup playoffs. During the post-season, he played on the third line along with Charlie Coyle and Marcus Johansson, and recorded two goals and six assists in 24 games as the Bruins reached the Stanley Cup Finals. As a result, he signed a two-year contract extension through the 2020–21 season on July 9, 2019.

=== Anaheim Ducks ===
On February 24, 2020, while in his fourth season with the Bruins, Heinen was dealt at the NHL trade deadline to the Anaheim Ducks in exchange for left winger Nick Ritchie. At the time of the trade, he had 22 points in 58 games with Bruins. Heinen scored his first goal with the team on February 29, against the Pittsburgh Penguins, but was ultimately unable to match his previous offensive efforts in the following season. He finished the 2020–21 season with the Ducks recording seven goals and 14 points in 43 games. As a pending restricted free agent, Heinen was not tendered a qualifying offer by Anaheim, and was released to free agency on July 27, 2021.

=== Pittsburgh Penguins ===
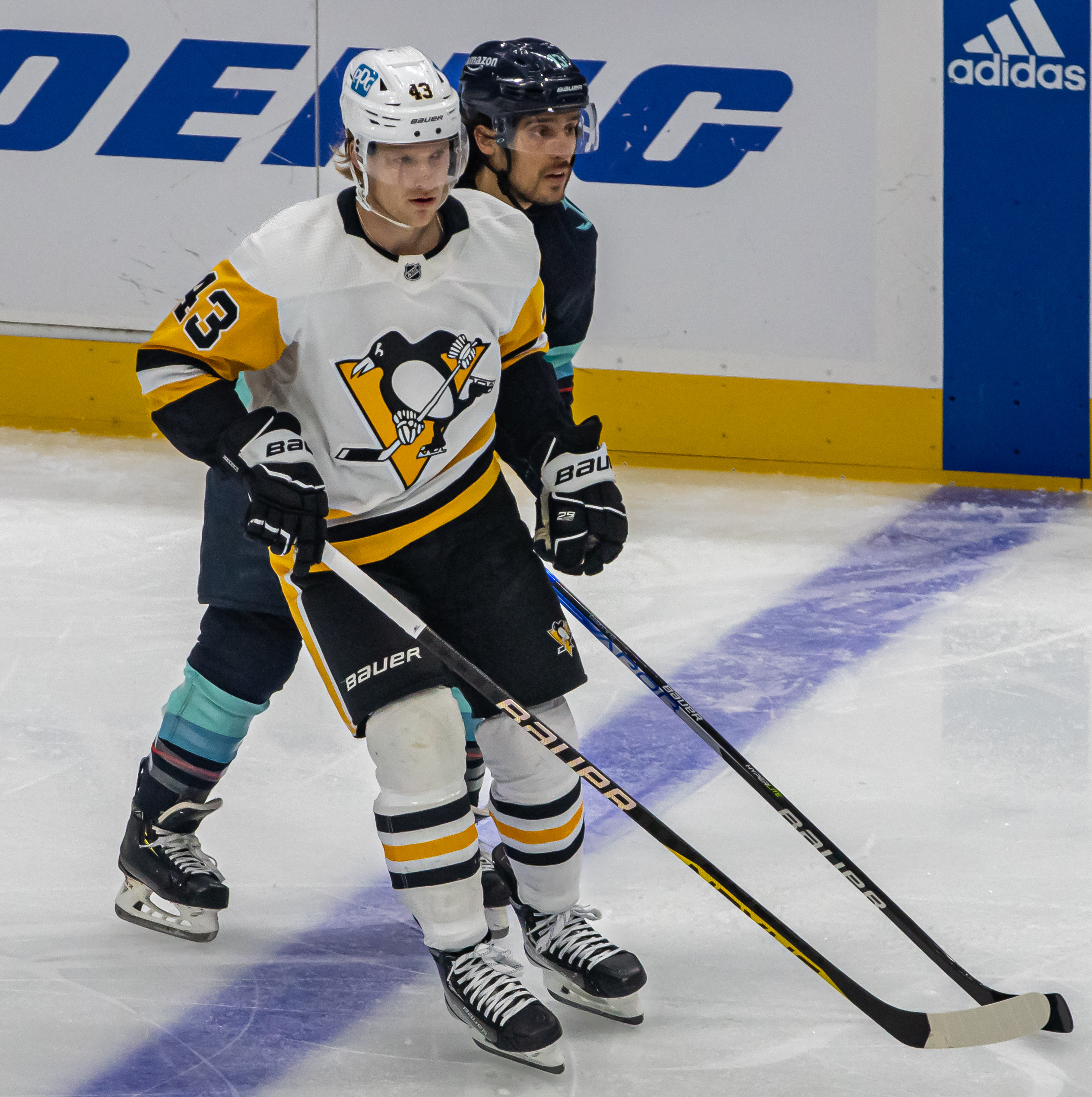
Heinen with the Penguins in October 2022

Heinen left the Ducks on July 29, 2021, by signing a one-year, $1.1 million contract with the Pittsburgh Penguins. Following the signing, he received praise from head coach Mike Sullivan who said: "He has the offensive instincts to think the game on a high level...I think he can play in the top-six if we need him to, but I think he'll also bring an offensive dimension to our top-nine if we need him to. I think he's going to be a real good player for us." While skating during training camp, Heinen skated on the right wing of their top line alongside Jake Guentzel and Jeff Carter. After attending their training camp, Heinen was named to their opening night roster against the Tampa Bay Lightning, and he scored his first goal that same night. Heinen continued to produce as the season continued and quickly began outpacing his teammates in goals per 60 minutes of 5-on-5 ice time. By April 2022, 14 of his goals had come at even strength, ranking him fourth on the team behind Guentzel, Sidney Crosby, and Bryan Rust.

As an impending restricted free agent, Heinen was not tendered a qualifying offer by the Penguins, releasing him as a free agent. After testing the market on July 27, 2022, Heinen was re-signed by the Penguins to a one-year, $1 million contract for the 2022–23 season.

=== Return to Boston ===
Heinen signed a professional tryout agreement with the Bruins on September 5, 2023. After playing in the preseason with the Bruins, Heinen went unsigned to start the season due to salary cap issues, but he officially returned to Boston on October 30, 2023, signing a one-year, $775,000 contract with the team. He played for the Bruins against the Florida Panthers on the same day. On January 20, 2024, Heinen scored his first career hat trick in a game against the Montreal Canadiens. Despite originally signing as a depth piece, Heinen impressed immensely during the season, and became a core piece of the Bruins team on their third line. He scored 17 goals and 19 assists for 36 points, which was his highest point total since his rookie season, also with Boston.

=== Vancouver Canucks ===
On July 1, 2024, Heinen signed a two-year, $4.5 million contract with the Vancouver Canucks.

=== Return to Pittsburgh ===
On January 31, 2025, Heinen was traded to Pittsburgh along with a conditional 2025 first-round pick, defenceman Vincent Desharnais, and right wing prospect Melvin Fernström in exchange for defenceman Marcus Pettersson and forward Drew O'Connor.

=== Columbus Blue Jackets ===
On December 29, 2025, Heinen was traded to the Columbus Blue Jackets alongside a 2nd-round pick in 2026 and 3rd-round pick in 2027, in exchange for Egor Chinakhov.

Heinen was re-signed by the Blue Jackets to a one-year, two-way contract extension on July 23, 2026.

== Career statistics ==
			Regular season					Playoffs
Season	Team	League	GP	G	A	Pts	PIM	GP	G	A	Pts	PIM
2010–11	Valley West Hawks	BCMML	4	1	2	3	0	2	0	0	0	0
2011–12	Valley West Hawks	BCMML	39	19	24	43	6	2	2	0	2	0
2012–13	Richmond Sockeyes	PIJHL	43	21	28	49	4	15	6	8	14	2
2012–13	Merritt Centennials	BCHL	4	0	4	4	4	—	—	—	—	—
2013–14	Surrey Eagles	BCHL	57	29	33	62	8	6	2	5	7	2
2014–15	University of Denver	NCHC	40	16	29	45	10	—	—	—	—	—
2015–16	University of Denver	NCHC	41	20	28	48	10	—	—	—	—	—
2015–16	Providence Bruins	AHL	2	0	2	2	2	2	0	0	0	0
2016–17	Boston Bruins	NHL	8	0	0	0	2	—	—	—	—	—
2016–17	Providence Bruins	AHL	64	14	30	44	14	17	9	9	18	0
2017–18	Boston Bruins	NHL	77	16	31	47	16	9	1	0	1	2
2017–18	Providence Bruins	AHL	4	1	7	8	2	—	—	—	—	—
2018–19	Boston Bruins	NHL	77	11	23	34	16	24	2	6	8	2
2019–20	Boston Bruins	NHL	58	7	15	22	8	—	—	—	—	—
2019–20	Anaheim Ducks	NHL	9	3	1	4	2	—	—	—	—	—
2020–21	Anaheim Ducks	NHL	43	7	7	14	0	—	—	—	—	—
2021–22	Pittsburgh Penguins	NHL	76	18	15	33	16	7	3	0	3	4
2022–23	Pittsburgh Penguins	NHL	65	8	14	22	12	—	—	—	—	—
2023–24	Boston Bruins	NHL	74	17	19	36	28	8	0	1	1	0
2024–25	Vancouver Canucks	NHL	51	6	12	18	31	—	—	—	—	—
2024–25	Pittsburgh Penguins	NHL	28	3	8	11	0	—	—	—	—	—
2025–26	Wilkes-Barre/Scranton Penguins	AHL	12	6	11	17	6	—	—	—	—	—
2025–26	Pittsburgh Penguins	NHL	13	1	1	2	8	—	—	—	—	—
2025–26	Cleveland Monsters	AHL	1	0	1	1	0	—	—	—	—	—
2025–26	Columbus Blue Jackets	NHL	33	5	5	10	8	—	—	—	—	—
NHL totals			612	102	151	253	147	48	6	7	13	8

Awards and achievements
Preceded by Jaccob Slavin	NCHC Rookie of the Year; 2014–15	Succeeded by Brock Boeser
Preceded by Trevor Moore	NCHC Forward of the Year; 2015–16	Succeeded by Anthony Louis
