= Drew O'Connor =

American ice hockey player (born 1998)

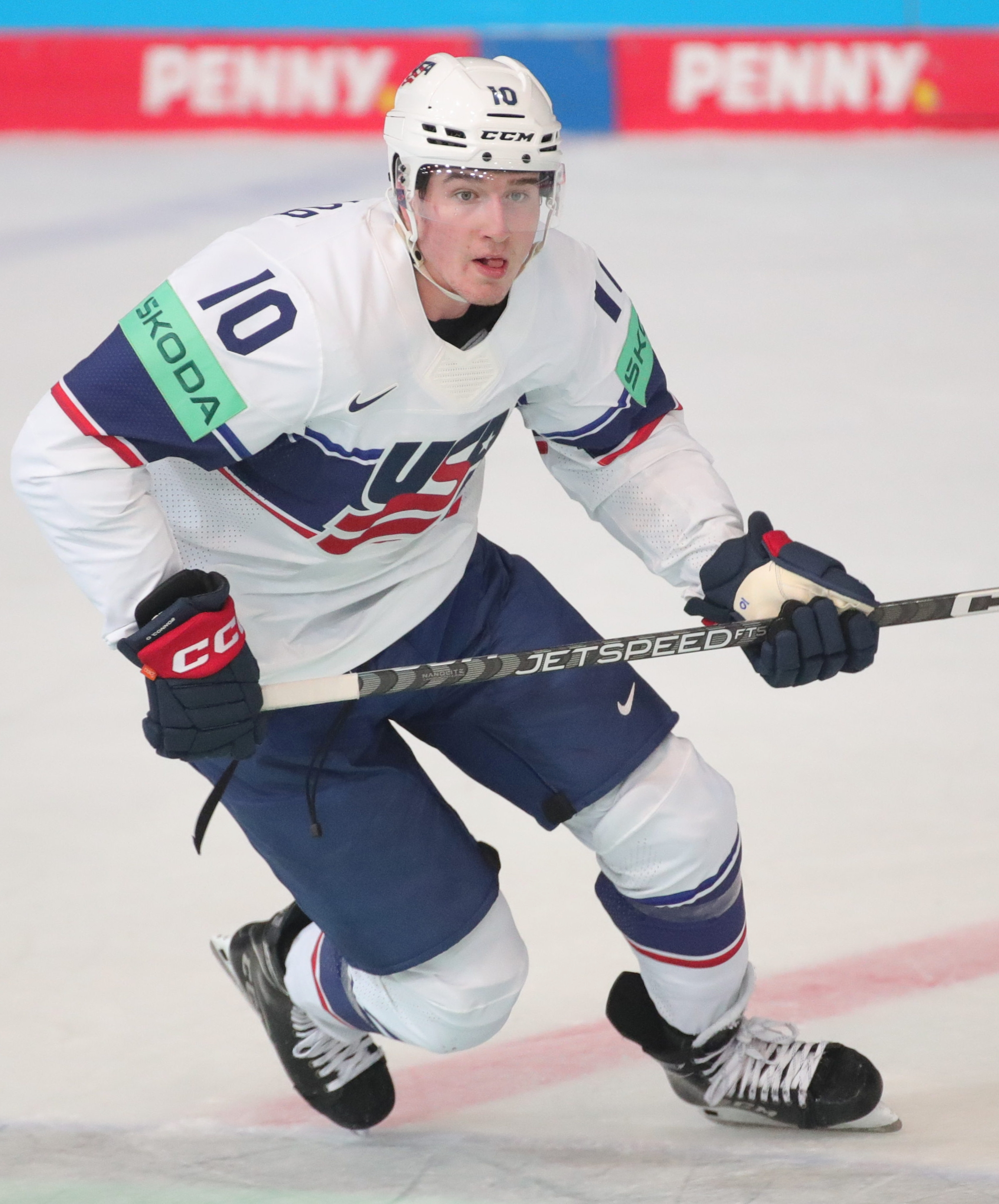
- O'Connor with the United States in 2023
- Born: June 9, 1998 (age 28) Chatham, New Jersey, U.S.
- Height: 6 ft 3 in (191 cm)
- Weight: 190 lb (86 kg; 13 st 8 lb)
- Position: Left wing
- Shoots: Left
- NHL team Former teams: Vancouver Canucks; Manglerud Star; Pittsburgh Penguins
- National team: United States
- NHL draft: Undrafted
- Playing career: 2020–present

Drew James O'Connor (born June 9, 1998) is an American professional ice hockey player who is a left winger and alternate captain for the Vancouver Canucks of the National Hockey League (NHL).

Growing up in New Jersey, O'Connor represented his home state on various occasions. He played with the New Jersey Colonials minor ice hockey team and scored the game-winning goal to clinch the 2011 USA 12U Hockey National Championship. In 2013, O'Connor began his high school career at the Delbarton School in the Northwest Jersey Athletic Conference. However, as his ice time declined, he joined the North Jersey Avalanche in the Tier 1 Elite Hockey League following his junior year. Although he helped them win the T1EHL Championship, O'Connor did not originally receive any hockey scholarships to play collegiate ice hockey. After taking part in a summer showcase in July and performing well, he was accepted into Dartmouth College but was recommended to spend a year of junior hockey with the Boston Junior Bruins of the National Collegiate Development Conference in the United States Premier Hockey League.

O'Connor had a successful career with the Dartmouth Big Green men's ice hockey team from 2018 to 2020. After finishing his freshman season with 17 goals and 28 points, he became the only rookie to earn a spot on either the first or second All-Ivy League Team. His goal and points totals also tied numerous program and league records. His goal total was ranked second among all first-year players in Division I in 2018–19 and third among all freshman in program history. His 26 points were second on the team and were the most by a Big Green rookie since Matt Lindblad's 28 in 2010–11. When he returned to the Big Green for his sophomore season, he broke his previous season's records. O'Connor became the first Dartmouth player since Scott Fleming in 2009–10 to reach 20 goals and the first Dartmouth player to lead the league in conference goals in 40 years. He also became the fourth player in Dartmouth history to be named the Ivy League Player of the Year and the eighth Dartmouth player to earn a selection onto the ECAC First Team. O'Connor also became the first Dartmouth player to be recognized by the New England Hockey Writers Association as an All-New England All-Star since 2006–07.

== Early life ==
O'Connor was born on June 9, 1998, in Chatham, New Jersey to parents Shawn and Meagan O'Connor. As a toddler, O'Connor and his older brother Jack would skate every Saturday at a rink in Bayonne, New Jersey. He grew up with two sisters, Erin and McKenna.

== Playing career ==
=== Amateur ===
Growing up in New Jersey, O'Connor represented his home state on various occasions. In 2010, he played in the Quebec International Pee-Wee Hockey Tournament with the New Jersey Colonials minor ice hockey team. He also tried out for the New York Rangers Quebec Team. While with the Colonials, O'Connor scored the game-winning goal to clinch the 2011 USA 12U Hockey National Championship. In 2013, O'Connor began his high school career at the Delbarton School in the Northwest Jersey Athletic Conference. As his ice time at Delbarton waned, O'Connor quit the team his junior year and joined the North Jersey Avalanche in the Tier 1 Elite Hockey League. In his first season with the Avalanche, O'Connor split time between the U18 team and the Avalanche's junior team. He helped them win the T1EHL Championship and earned a berth in the USA Hockey Nationals.

However, by the time he graduated, he had not received any hockey scholarships to play collegiate ice hockey. After taking part in a summer showcase in July and performing well, he received enrollment offers from Division III schools and Dartmouth College. Although Dartmouth offered him a spot, the coaches recommended that O'Connor spend a year of junior hockey with the Boston Junior Bruins of the National Collegiate Development Conference in the United States Premier Hockey League. In their inaugural NCDC season, O'Connor scored 39 points through 49 games. Although he graduated high school at 5-foot-10, O'Connor arrived on the Dartmouth campus in 2018 at 6-foot-3.

=== Collegiate ===
O'Connor played for the Dartmouth Big Green at Dartmouth College from 2018 to 2020. There, he enrolled in the School of Liberal Arts and majored in Sociology. He scored three points, including his first collegiate goal, in his first collegiate game as the Big Green defeated Harvard 6–5 in overtime. After adding a goal and two assists in the Big Green's 7–6 overtime win against the RPI Engineers, O'Connor received the ECAC's Rookie of the Week honor. He later recorded his first collegiate two-goal game on November 24 in a 5–3 loss to Vermont. On March 4, O'Connor earned his second ECAC Rookie of the Week honor after tallying three goals in a road split against Union and Rensselaer. Shortly thereafter, he earned his third ECAC Rookie of the Week honor for the week ending on March 11 for tallying six goals over five games. His six goals in March were also tied for the most by any player in Division I. O'Connor finished his freshman season as the only rookie to earn a spot on either the first or second All-Ivy League Team.

Furthermore, he established multiple program and league records by netting 17 goals and tallying 26 points. His goal count stood as the second-highest among all Division I first-year players in the 2018-19 season, while it also ranked as the third-highest among freshmen in the history of the program. Additionally, his point total placed him second on the team and represented the highest accumulation by a rookie since Matt Lindblad in 2010–11.

Following an outstanding freshman season, O'Connor was invited to participate in the Boston Bruins' Development Camp in June and July. He returned to Dartmouth for the 2019–20 season where he broke out offensively. During the week of November 18, O'Connor tallied three goals and three assists for six points over three games. His six points tied him for the ECAC Hockey lead in scoring and he was subsequently named the ECAC Hockey Player of the Week. As the Big Green began to suffer from injuries, O'Connor was moved out of his original position into a center role. In his first game as a center, he scored two goals and spent time on the power-play to beat Colorado College 5–2 on December 17. In the Ledyard Classic, O'Connor scored three times and finished with five points to earn all-tournament honors as he helped the Big Green to the title for the first time in four seasons. This continued into January and O'Connor quickly positioned himself as one of the top players in ECAC Hockey. He had accumulated a team-leading 10 points through 10 games leading into Winter break and then added seven more points in four games upon returning. By January 16, O'Connor had passed his previous season's goal total with 27 to rank second-best in the conference while the Big Green ranked seventh in the 12-team ECAC.

As the season began to come to a close, O'Connor recorded the first collegiate hat trick in a 5–3 win over Union on February 28. He subsequently became the first Dartmouth player since Scott Fleming in 2009–10 to reach 20 goals and the first Dartmouth player to lead the league in conference goals in 40 years. O'Connor finished the 2019–20 season with 21 goals through 29 games to become the fourth player in Dartmouth history to be named the Ivy League Player of the Year. He also became the eighth Dartmouth player to earn a selection onto the ECAC First Team. Although his season had ended, O'Connor also became the first Dartmouth player to be recognized by the New England Hockey Writers Association as an All-New England All-Star since David Jones in 2006–07.

=== Professional ===
==== Pittsburgh Penguins ====
Following the conclusion of the season, O'Connor signed a two-year, entry-level contract with the Pittsburgh Penguins. He had also been heavily recruited by the Boston Bruins, San Jose Sharks, Buffalo Sabres, and Anaheim Ducks.

As the NHL paused play due to the COVID-19 pandemic, O'Connor was loaned to the Manglerud Star Ishockey in the GET. He tallied six goals and four assists through seven games before reporting to the Penguins' training camp in advance of the pandemic-shortened 2020–21 season. After attending the Penguins' training camp, O'Connor was assigned to their Taxi Squad to begin the season. He was recalled to the NHL on January 26 after Evan Rodrigues was injured in the previous game against the New York Rangers.

O'Connor subsequently made his NHL debut that night in a 3–2 win over the Boston Bruins. He tallied his first NHL assist in 10:51 minutes of ice time while also seeing time on the second power-play unit. After making his debut, O'Connor played three more games for the Penguins before getting re-assigned to the taxi squad on February 2. He remained with the Taxi Squad for only a few days before returning to the Penguins lineup on February 6. He spent the remainder of the month in and out of the Penguins lineup before being re-assigned to their American Hockey League (AHL) affiliate, the Wilkes-Barre/Scranton Penguins (WBS), in early March.

O'Connor made an immediate impact in the WBS lineup by scoring his first professional goal in his first game in the AHL to lead the Penguins to a 6–3 win over the Binghamton Devils. By the time O'Connor was re-assigned to the Penguins Taxi Squad on April 5, he had tallied four goals and four assists for eight points through eight games. O'Connor finished the AHL regular season with seven goals and 12 assists through 20 games but proved less successful at the NHL level. He finished the NHL's regular season playing in 10 games for the Penguins and only accumulating one assist. During the 2021 offseason, O'Connor made numerous dietary changes including cutting out all gluten and all dairy. He also worked on putting on more weight in the gym and getting faster.

After impressing at the Penguins 2021 training camp, O'Connor made their opening night roster ahead of the 2021–22 season. Over his first 12 games of the season, he played left wing on a line with center Brian Boyle while averaging 11:02 in ice time. On October 16, 2021, O'Connor scored his first career NHL goal to lead the Penguins to a 5–2 win over the Chicago Blackhawks. His goal and assist helped coach Mike Sullivan get the most wins of any coach in Pittsburgh Penguins history. O'Connor was re-assigned to the WBS Penguins on November 14 after Sidney Crosby, Brian Dumoulin, Marcus Pettersson, and Chad Ruhwedel were activated from the NHL's COVID-19 Protocol List. At the time of the assignment, O'Connor had tallied three goals and two assists through 12 games along with 11 hits and five blocked shots. He tallied five points over five games in the AHL before rejoining the Penguins at the NHL level on November 28. After spending some time on the NHL's COVID-19 Protocol List in January, O'Connor was re-assigned to the AHL on January 10. However, later that month, O'Connor suffered from a collapsed lung that was unrelated to his earlier bout with COVID-19. He subsequently missed 11 games to recover before rejoining the Pittsburgh Penguins for the team's first practice after the 2022 NHL All-Star Game.

As he continued to split the season between the NHL and AHL, O'Connor signed a one-year contract extension on March 12, 2022, with an average annual value of $750,000. O'Connor finished the AHL regular season with a career-high 12 goals and 20 assists for 32 points while leading the team with 0.98 points-per-game. After their regular season ended, he rejoined the Penguins at the NHL level for the 2022 Stanley Cup playoffs. O'Connor made his postseason debut with the Penguins during Game 2 of their Eastern First Round series against the New York Rangers. He recorded one hit and one blocked shot in 6:33 minutes of ice time in the 5–2 loss. He remained sidelined for three more games before stepping in for Crosby in Game 6. The Penguins were eventually eliminated by the Rangers in Game 7.

Although O'Connor impressed the Penguins coaching staff during the 2023 training camp and preseason, salary cap constraints forced O'Connor to open the 2022-23 season with the WBS Penguins. After tallying two goals and four assists through the WBS Penguins first eight games, O'Connor was recalled to the NHL level on October 31. He played in three games during his brief recall without accumulating a point before being re-assigned to the WBS Penguins on November 6. O'Connor spent the remainder of November in the AHL where he quickly became their top center and point producer. He generated five goals and 11 assists through 12 games and earned another recall to the NHL level on December 14. At the time of his recall, O'Connor had also tied a franchise record for most points collected over two games. Over two games, one against the Hershey Bears and another against the Cleveland Monsters, O'Connor had tallied nine points.

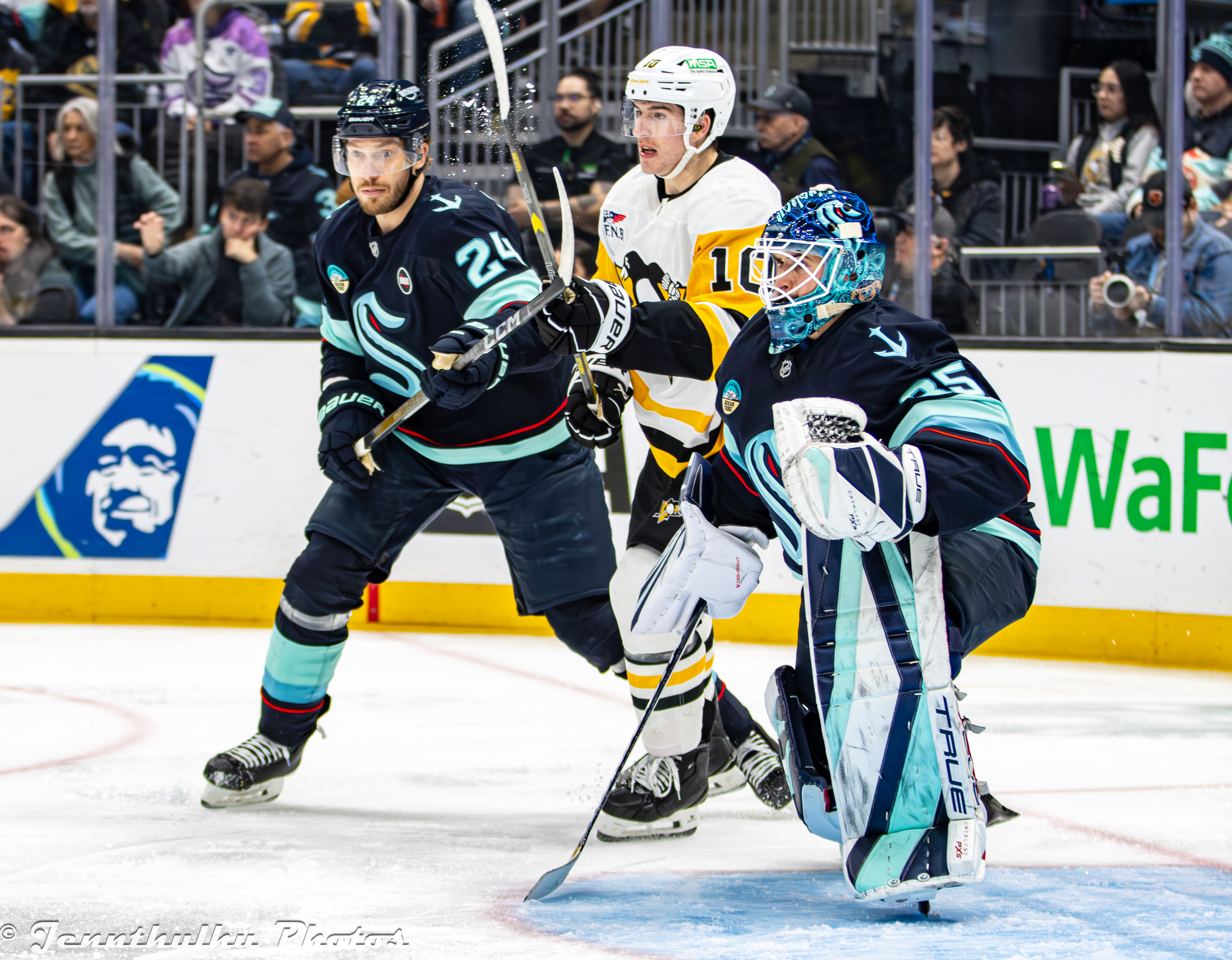
O'Connor (centre) with the Penguins in 2025.

O'Connor quickly became a mainstay in the Penguins lineup as he tallied four goals and three assists for seven points over 25 games while averaging nine minutes per game. He continued to improve as various injuries befelled some of the Penguins top forwards. Appearing in 43 of the team's final 50 games of the season, O'Connor averaged 9:54 of ice time per contest while accumulating five goals and six assists. After the Penguins failed to qualify for the 2023 Stanley Cup playoffs, O'Connor was selected for the United States men's national ice hockey team to compete at the 2023 IIHF World Championship. While Team USA failed to medal, O'Connor tallied three goals and five assists for eight points through 10 games played.

Upon concluding the championship, O'Connor re-enrolled in Dartmouth to finish his Bachelor's degree in sociology and officially graduated on September 7, 2023. While completing classes over the summer, he also worked out and trained at Dartmouth's Thompson Arena. Ahead of the 2023–24 season, the Penguins signed O'Connor to a two-year contract with an average annual value of $925,000. While O'Connor started the Penguins training camp on their third line with Lars Eller and Rickard Rakell, he finished their preseason on their top line alongside Crosby and Bryan Rust.

O'Connor struggled to produce for the Penguins in the first half of the following season. Although he scored three goals in his first six games, O'Connor then suffered a goal drought which extended 32 games. He finally broke the streak on December 31, 2024, where he scored both Penguins goals in a 4–2 loss to the Detroit Red Wings. He would score only once more over his final 14 games with the Penguins.

==== Vancouver Canucks ====
On January 31, 2025, O'Connor was traded to the Vancouver Canucks along with defenseman Marcus Pettersson, in exchange for forward Danton Heinen, defenceman Vincent Desharnais, right wing prospect Melvin Fernström and a conditional 2025 first-round pick.

Less than three weeks after being acquired by Vancouver, O'Connor signed a two-year, $5 million contract extension to stay with the Canucks through the 2026-27 season.

== International play ==
Medal record

Representing the United States

Ice hockey

World Championships
Gold medal – first place	2025 Sweden/Denmark	

O'Connor represented the United States at the 2025 IIHF World Championship, where he recorded one goal and three assists in ten games and helped Team USA win their first gold medal since 1933.

== Career statistics ==
=== Regular season and playoffs ===
			Regular season					Playoffs
Season	Team	League	GP	G	A	Pts	PIM	GP	G	A	Pts	PIM
2013–14	Delbarton School	USHS	9	0	1	1	0	—	—	—	—	—
2014–15	Delbarton School	USHS	28	1	7	8	10	—	—	—	—	—
2015–16	North Jersey Avalanche	T1EHL	23	6	12	18	6	5	1	1	2	0
2016–17	North Jersey Avalanche	T1EHL	31	11	13	24	18	5	2	2	4	4
2016–17	New Jersey Junior Titans	NAHL	3	0	0	0	0	—	—	—	—	—
2017-18	Boston Jr. Bruins	NCDC	49	13	26	39	12	6	0	5	5	2
2018–19	Dartmouth College	ECAC	34	17	9	26	14	—	—	—	—	—
2019–20	Dartmouth College	ECAC	31	21	12	33	42	—	—	—	—	—
2020–21	Manglerud Star	GET	7	6	4	10	8	—	—	—	—	—
2020–21	Pittsburgh Penguins	NHL	10	0	1	1	2	—	—	—	—	—
2020–21	Wilkes-Barre/Scranton Penguins	AHL	20	7	12	19	14	—	—	—	—	—
2021–22	Pittsburgh Penguins	NHL	22	3	2	5	4	2	0	0	0	0
2021–22	Wilkes-Barre/Scranton Penguins	AHL	33	12	20	32	19	—	—	—	—	—
2022–23	Wilkes-Barre/Scranton Penguins	AHL	20	8	14	22	18	—	—	—	—	—
2022–23	Pittsburgh Penguins	NHL	46	5	6	11	12	—	—	—	—	—
2023–24	Pittsburgh Penguins	NHL	79	16	17	33	20	—	—	—	—	—
2024–25	Pittsburgh Penguins	NHL	53	6	10	16	16	—	—	—	—	—
2024–25	Vancouver Canucks	NHL	31	4	5	9	18	—	—	—	—	—
2025–26	Vancouver Canucks	NHL	82	17	12	29	47	—	—	—	—	—
GET totals			7	6	4	10	8	—	—	—	—	—
NHL totals			323	51	53	104	119	2	0	0	0	0

=== International ===
Year	Team	Event	Result	GP	G	A	Pts	PIM
2023	United States	WC	4th	10	3	5	8	0
2025	United States	WC	1st place, gold medalist(s)	10	1	3	4	2
Senior totals				20	4	8	12	2

== Awards and honours ==
Award	Year	Ref
College
All-Ivy League Second Team	2019	
All-Ivy League First Team	2020	
Ivy League Player of the Year	2020	
ECAC First Team	2020	
