= Vincent Desharnais =

Canadian ice hockey player (born 1996)

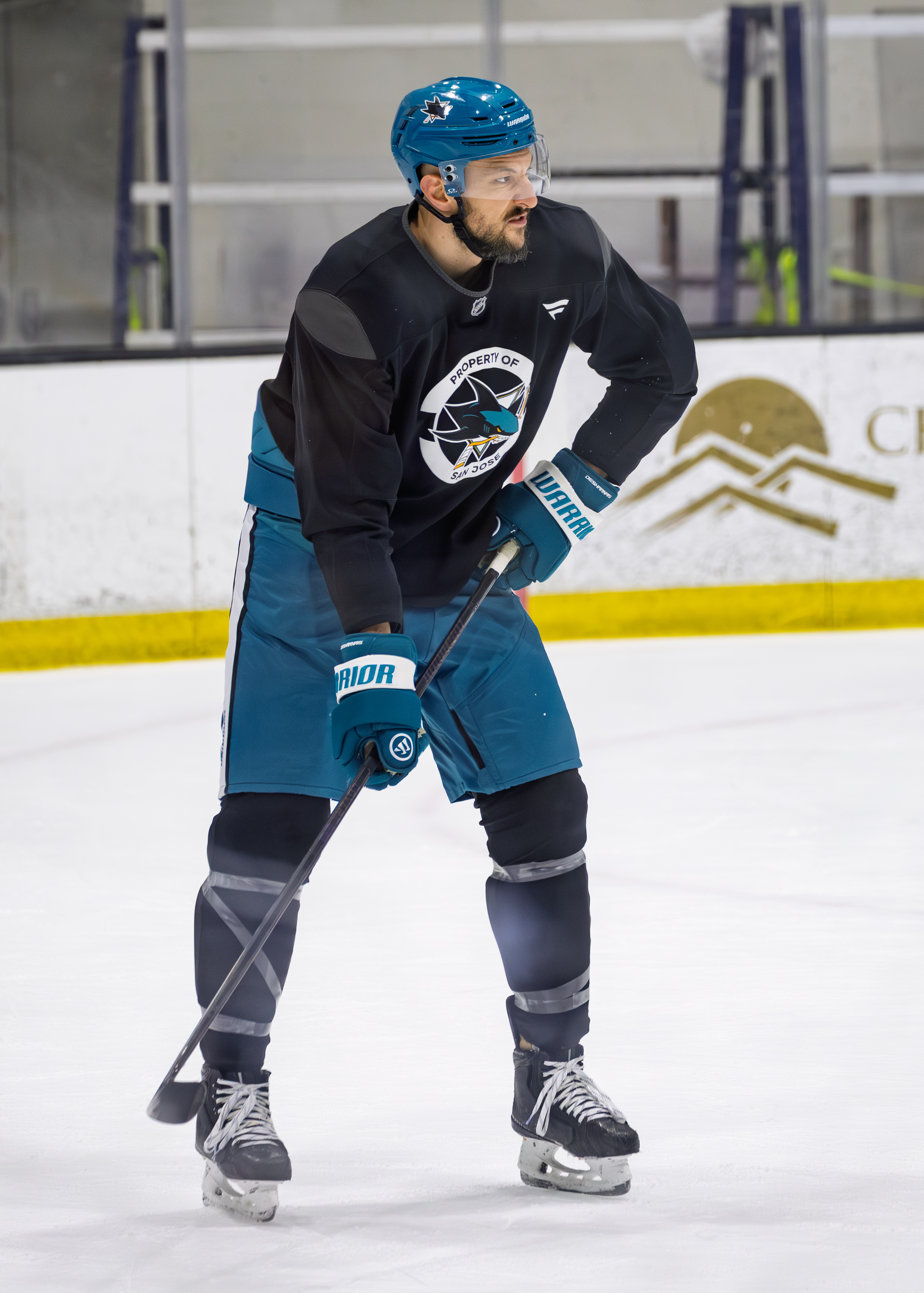
- Desharnais with the San Jose Sharks in 2026
- Born: May 29, 1996 (age 30) Laval, Quebec, Canada
- Height: 6 ft 7 in (201 cm)
- Weight: 225 lb (102 kg; 16 st 1 lb)
- Position: Defence
- Shoots: Right
- NHL team Former teams: Washington Capitals; Edmonton Oilers; Vancouver Canucks; Pittsburgh Penguins; San Jose Sharks
- NHL draft: 183rd overall, 2016; Edmonton Oilers
- Playing career: 2019–present

Vincent Desharnais (born May 29, 1996) is a Canadian professional ice hockey player who is a defenceman for the Washington Capitals of the National Hockey League (NHL). He was drafted by the Edmonton Oilers in the seventh round, 183rd overall, in the 2016 NHL entry draft.

== Playing career ==
=== Amateur ===
Desharnais played college hockey with Providence College from 2015 to 2019, after playing a season for the Chilliwack Chiefs of the British Columbia Hockey League (BCHL). In his last year of colligate hockey he won the Hockey East Best Defensive Defenseman of the Year award. He was a 7th-round draft pick of the Edmonton Oilers in the 2016 NHL entry draft, in his third year of draft eligibility.

=== Professional ===
After playing three seasons of minor pro with the Wichita Thunder of the ECHL and the Bakersfield Condors of the American Hockey League (AHL), Desharnais was signed in March 2022 by the Oilers to a two-year, entry-level contract.

During the 2022–23 season, Desharnais was recalled by the Oilers and played his first NHL game on January 11, 2023, a 6–2 victory against the Anaheim Ducks. Desharnais scored his first career NHL goal on October 29, 2023, in an outdoor game against the Calgary Flames where the Oilers won 5–2. During his time with the Oilers, Desharnais played in the 2022 and 2023 Stanley Cup playoffs.

On July 1, 2024, Desharnais signed a two-year, $4 million contract with the Vancouver Canucks as an unrestricted free agent. During the 2024–25 season, he posted 3 assists and 34 penalty minutes in 34 games.

On January 31, 2025, Desharnais was traded to the Pittsburgh Penguins along with a conditional 2025 first-round pick, forward Danton Heinen and right wing prospect Melvin Fernström in exchange for defenceman Marcus Pettersson and forward Drew O'Connor. Desharnais appeared in ten games with the Penguins and earned a +4 rating and four penalty minutes.

On March 5, 2025, the Penguins traded Desharnais to the San Jose Sharks in exchange for a 2028 fifth-round draft pick.

On July 1, 2026, Desharnais signed a four-year, $16.8 million contract with the Washington Capitals.

== Personal life ==
Desharnais is the youngest in his family. His father, Jacques, and brother, Alex, have been cited by Desharnais as his hockey-playing influences. He is not related to former Montreal Canadiens center David Desharnais.

Desharnais has spoken about mental health concerns that he had suffered while playing in the NHL, stating that in his first pro season he had received a concussion and took longer then expected to heal, leading to anxiety attacks and became depressed. He credits the time as a learning period, to accept help and learn methods to help deal with his anxiety and depression.

=== Philanthropy ===
In 2019, Desharnais was announced as a nominee for the Hockey Humanitarian Award. The award is presented annually to an NCAA student-athlete who makes significant contributions not only to his or her team but also to the community-at-large through leadership in volunteerism. Desharnais was recognized for an event he hosted, "PC Beats Cancer" an event in which over $5,100 was raised for the Gloria Gemma Foundation.

In 2020, Desharnais raised over $6,000 for the Défi Tête rasée Leucan to shave his head. In 2022, Desharnais helped Kevin Raphael and Leucan – with his second shaved head challenge – raise over $50,000.

== Career statistics ==
			Regular season					Playoffs
Season	Team	League	GP	G	A	Pts	PIM	GP	G	A	Pts	PIM
2013–14	Northwood School	USHS	37	5	16	21	12	—	—	—	—	—
2014–15	Chilliwack Chiefs	BCHL	54	1	4	5	52	12	1	7	8	0
2015–16	Providence College	HE	19	1	1	2	8	—	—	—	—	—
2016–17	Providence College	HE	32	2	1	3	22	—	—	—	—	—
2017–18	Providence College	HE	38	0	11	11	36	—	—	—	—	—
2018–19	Providence College	HE	42	5	8	13	32	—	—	—	—	—
2019–20	Wichita Thunder	ECHL	31	0	13	13	24	—	—	—	—	—
2019–20	Bakersfield Condors	AHL	6	0	0	0	7	—	—	—	—	—
2020–21	Wichita Thunder	ECHL	6	0	4	4	14	—	—	—	—	—
2020–21	Bakersfield Condors	AHL	37	0	10	10	36	6	0	1	1	6
2021–22	Bakersfield Condors	AHL	66	5	22	27	55	5	0	1	1	2
2022–23	Bakersfield Condors	AHL	13	0	2	2	19	—	—	—	—	—
2022–23	Edmonton Oilers	NHL	36	0	5	5	31	12	0	2	2	8
2023–24	Edmonton Oilers	NHL	78	1	10	11	54	16	0	1	1	22
2024–25	Vancouver Canucks	NHL	34	0	3	3	34	—	—	—	—	—
2024–25	Pittsburgh Penguins	NHL	10	0	0	0	4	—	—	—	—	—
2024–25	San Jose Sharks	NHL	7	0	0	0	7	—	—	—	—	—
2025–26	San Jose Sharks	NHL	53	1	6	7	68	—	—	—	—	—
NHL totals			218	2	24	26	198	28	0	3	3	30

== Awards and honours ==
Award	Year
College
Hockey East Best Defensive Defenseman	2019
ECHL
All-Star Game	2020
