= Marcus Pettersson =

Swedish ice hockey player (born 1996)

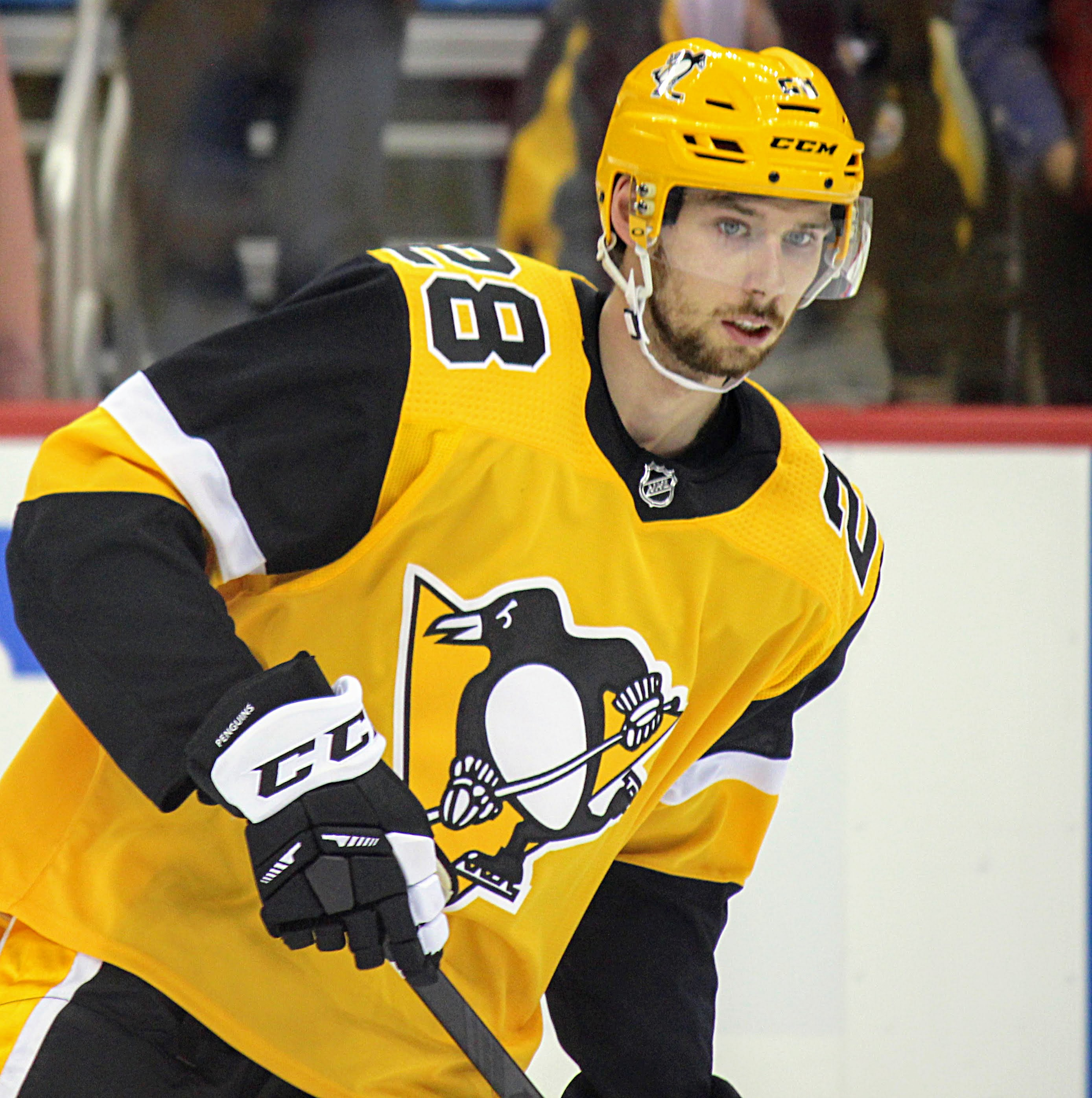
- Pettersson with the Pittsburgh Penguins in 2018
- Born: 8 May 1996 (age 30) Skellefteå, Sweden
- Height: 6 ft 4 in (193 cm)
- Weight: 174 lb (79 kg; 12 st 6 lb)
- Position: Defence
- Shoots: Left
- NHL team Former teams: New York Rangers; Skellefteå AIK; Anaheim Ducks; Pittsburgh Penguins; Vancouver Canucks
- National team: Sweden
- NHL draft: 38th overall, 2014; Anaheim Ducks
- Playing career: 2013–present

Marcus Karl Gustav Pettersson (born 8 May 1996) is a Swedish professional ice hockey player who is a defenceman for the New York Rangers of the National Hockey League (NHL).

== Early life ==
Pettersson was born on 8 May 1996, in Skellefteå, Sweden. He is the son of Daniel Pettersson, who played for Skellefteå AIK for 14 seasons.

== Playing career ==
=== SHL ===
Pettersson made his Swedish Hockey League (SHL) debut playing with Skellefteå AIK during the 2013–14 season.

=== Anaheim Ducks ===
Pettersson was selected by the Anaheim Ducks in the second round, 38th overall, of the 2014 NHL entry draft.

On 13 June 2015, Pettersson was signed to a three-year, entry-level contract by the Anaheim Ducks.

Pettersson began the 2017–18 season playing for the San Diego Gulls of the American Hockey League. He was called up to the NHL on 21 February 2018, and he recorded his first NHL goal on 4 March, in a 6–3 win against the Chicago Blackhawks.

=== Pittsburgh Penguins ===
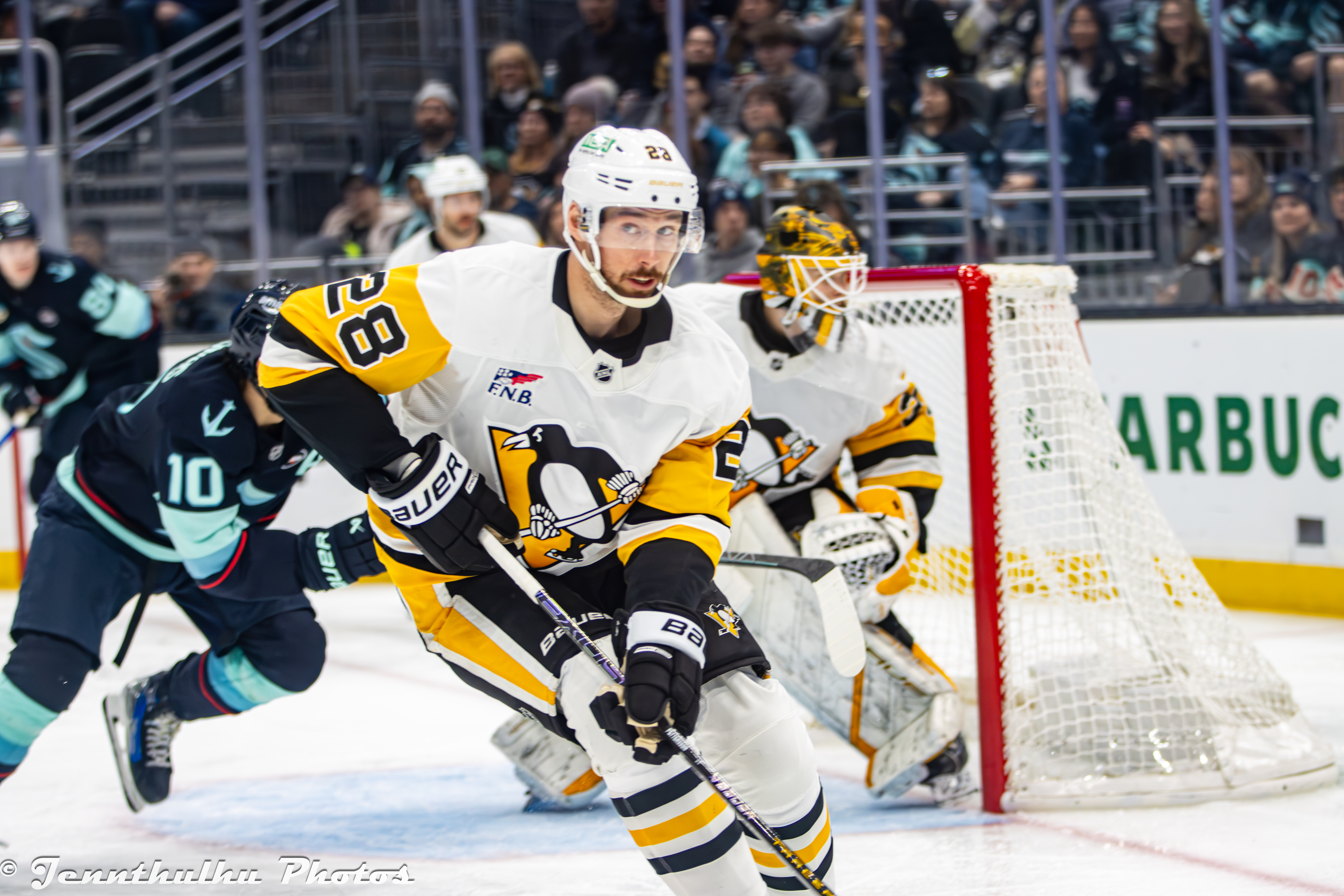
Pettersson with the Penguins in the 2024–25 season.

During the 2018–19 season, on 3 December 2018, Pettersson was traded by the Ducks to the Pittsburgh Penguins in exchange for Daniel Sprong. He scored his first goal with the Penguins on 7 February 2019, against the Florida Panthers.

On 12 September 2019, Pettersson re-signed with the Penguins on a one-year contract worth $874,125. On 28 January 2020, Pettersson signed a five-year, $20.125 million contract extension with the Penguins.

On 9 March 2023, Pettersson recorded an assist for his 100th NHL point. Pettersson was placed on long-term injured reserve after suffering an injury on 18 March 2023. He returned to the line-up on 13 April after missing 12 games.

Pettersson was injured on 14 December 2024, and was placed on injured reserve. He was activated from injured reserve on 31 December.

=== Vancouver Canucks ===
On 31 January 2025, Pettersson was traded to the Vancouver Canucks along with forward Drew O'Connor, in exchange for forward Danton Heinen, defenceman Vincent Desharnais, right wing prospect Melvin Fernström and a conditional 2025 first-round pick. On 5 February, Pettersson signed a six-year, $33 million contract extension with the Canucks.

=== New York Rangers ===
On 1 July 2026, Pettersson was traded to the New York Rangers in exchange for a top 10 protected 2030 first-round pick, waiving his no-movement clause in the process.

== International play ==
Medal record

Men's ice hockey

Representing Sweden

World Championships
Bronze medal – third place	2024 Czech Republic	
Bronze medal – third place	2025 Sweden/Denmark	

On 9 May 2019, Pettersson was named to make his senior international debut with Sweden at the 2019 World Championship.

He represented Sweden at the 2024 World Championship, winning a bronze medal.

== Personal life ==
Pettersson married his wife in July 2024. They have one son.

== Career statistics ==
=== Regular season and playoffs ===
			Regular season					Playoffs
Season	Team	League	GP	G	A	Pts	PIM	GP	G	A	Pts	PIM
2010–11	Skellefteå AIK	J18 Allsv	2	0	0	0	0	—	—	—	—	—
2011–12	Skellefteå AIK	J18	16	2	5	7	2	—	—	—	—	—
2011–12	Skellefteå AIK	J18 Allsv	17	0	5	5	10	7	1	3	4	14
2012–13	Skellefteå AIK	J18 Allsv	2	0	0	0	0	9	2	7	9	4
2012–13	Skellefteå AIK	J20	37	4	8	12	16	2	0	0	0	0
2013–14	Skellefteå AIK	J20	38	4	14	18	38	2	0	0	0	2
2013–14	Skellefteå AIK	SHL	10	0	0	0	2	—	—	—	—	—
2013–14	Skellefteå AIK	J18 Allsv	—	—	—	—	—	3	0	1	1	4
2014–15	Skellefteå AIK	J20	20	2	8	10	20	1	0	0	0	2
2014–15	Skellefteå AIK	SHL	14	0	0	0	0	—	—	—	—	—
2014–15	HC Vita Hästen	Allsv	10	2	2	4	16	9	1	2	3	8
2015–16	Skellefteå AIK	SHL	46	2	5	7	10	8	0	0	0	0
2016–17	Skellefteå AIK	SHL	41	2	7	9	49	—	—	—	—	—
2017–18	San Diego Gulls	AHL	44	0	14	14	22	—	—	—	—	—
2017–18	Anaheim Ducks	NHL	22	1	3	4	6	4	0	0	0	2
2018–19	Anaheim Ducks	NHL	27	0	6	6	17	—	—	—	—	—
2018–19	Pittsburgh Penguins	NHL	57	2	17	19	49	4	0	1	1	4
2019–20	Pittsburgh Penguins	NHL	69	2	20	22	35	4	0	0	0	4
2020–21	Pittsburgh Penguins	NHL	47	2	7	9	22	6	0	1	1	0
2021–22	Pittsburgh Penguins	NHL	72	2	17	19	38	7	0	2	2	2
2022–23	Pittsburgh Penguins	NHL	68	1	23	24	58	—	—	—	—	—
2023–24	Pittsburgh Penguins	NHL	82	4	26	30	44	—	—	—	—	—
2024–25	Pittsburgh Penguins	NHL	47	3	15	18	25	—	—	—	—	—
2024–25	Vancouver Canucks	NHL	31	1	10	11	20	—	—	—	—	—
2025–26	Vancouver Canucks	NHL	82	3	15	18	60	—	—	—	—	—
SHL totals			111	4	12	16	61	8	0	0	0	0
NHL totals			604	21	159	180	374	25	0	4	4	12

=== International ===
Year	Team	Event	Result	GP	G	A	Pts	PIM
2013	Sweden	U17	1st place, gold medalist(s)	6	0	0	0	4
2014	Sweden	WJC18	4th	7	1	0	1	2
2016	Sweden	WJC	4th	7	0	4	4	6
2019	Sweden	WC	5th	8	0	1	1	4
2022	Sweden	WC	6th	4	0	0	0	0
2024	Sweden	WC	3rd place, bronze medalist(s)	10	3	2	5	2
2025	Sweden	WC	3rd place, bronze medalist(s)	10	0	4	4	0
Junior totals				20	1	4	5	12
Senior totals				32	3	7	10	6
