= 2024–25 Vancouver Canucks season =

National Hockey League season

2024–25 Vancouver Canucks
- Division: 5th Pacific
- Conference: 10th Western
- 2024–25 record: 38–30–14
- Home record: 17–16–8
- Road record: 21–14–6
- Goals for: 236
- Goals against: 253

Team information
- General manager: Patrik Allvin
- Coach: Rick Tocchet
- Captain: Quinn Hughes
- Alternate captains: J. T. Miller (Oct. 9 – Jan. 31); Tyler Myers (Jan. 31 – Apr. 16); Elias Pettersson
- Arena: Rogers Arena
- Average attendance: 18,810
- Minor league affiliates: Abbotsford Canucks (AHL); Kalamazoo Wings (ECHL)

Team leaders
- Goals: Jake DeBrusk (28)
- Assists: Quinn Hughes (60)
- Points: Quinn Hughes (76)
- Penalty minutes: Tyler Myers (74)
- Plus/minus: Marcus Pettersson (+8)
- Wins: Kevin Lankinen (25)
- Goals against average: Nikita Tolopilo (2.15)

The 2024–25 Vancouver Canucks season was the 55th season for the National Hockey League (NHL) franchise that was established on May 22, 1970.

The Canucks failed to improve upon their 2023–24 season (in which the Canucks finished first in the Pacific Division but lost in the second round of the playoffs to the Edmonton Oilers), as the 2024-2025 Canucks were eliminated from playoff contention on April 9, 2025 after the Minnesota Wild defeated the San Jose Sharks in overtime. The Canucks set a franchise record for the most overtime losses in a season with 14, which also matched the Calgary Flames for the most overtime losses during the regular season.

== Standings ==
=== Divisional standings ===
Pacific Division
Pos	Team	GP	W	L	OTL	RW	GF	GA	GD	Pts
1	y – Vegas Golden Knights	82	50	22	10	46	275	219	+56	110
2	x – Los Angeles Kings	82	48	25	9	43	250	206	+44	105
3	x – Edmonton Oilers	82	48	29	5	36	259	236	+23	101
4	Calgary Flames	82	41	27	14	31	225	238	−13	96
5	Vancouver Canucks	82	38	30	14	28	236	253	−17	90
6	Anaheim Ducks	82	35	37	10	24	221	263	−42	80
7	Seattle Kraken	82	35	41	6	28	247	265	−18	76
8	San Jose Sharks	82	20	50	12	14	210	315	−105	52

Source: National Hockey League
Rules for classification: 1) Fewer number of games played (GP, only during regular season); 2) Greater number of regulation wins (RW); 3) Greater number of wins in regulation and overtime, excluding shootout wins (ROW); 4) Greater number of total wins, including shootouts (W); 5) Greater number of points earned in head-to-head play; if teams played an uneven number of head-to-head games, the result of the first game on the home ice of the team with the extra home game is discarded; 6) Greater goal differential (GD); 7) Greater number of goals scored (GF)
x – Clinched playoff spot; y – Clinched division

=== Conference standings ===
Western Conference Wild Card
Pos	Div	Team	GP	W	L	OTL	RW	GF	GA	GD	Pts
1	CE	x – Minnesota Wild	82	45	30	7	33	228	239	−11	97
2	CE	x – St. Louis Blues	82	44	30	8	32	254	233	+21	96
3	PA	Calgary Flames	82	41	27	14	31	225	238	−13	96
4	PA	Vancouver Canucks	82	38	30	14	28	236	253	−17	90
5	CE	Utah Hockey Club	82	38	31	13	30	241	251	−10	89
6	PA	Anaheim Ducks	82	35	37	10	24	221	263	−42	80
7	PA	Seattle Kraken	82	35	41	6	28	247	265	−18	76
8	CE	Nashville Predators	82	30	44	8	24	214	274	−60	68
9	CE	Chicago Blackhawks	82	25	46	11	20	226	296	−70	61
10	PA	San Jose Sharks	82	20	50	12	14	210	315	−105	52

Source: National Hockey League
Rules for classification: 1) Fewer number of games played (GP, only during regular season); 2) Greater number of regulation wins (RW); 3) Greater number of wins in regulation and overtime, excluding shootout wins (ROW); 4) Greater number of total wins, including shootouts (W); 5) Greater number of points earned in head-to-head play; if teams played an uneven number of head-to-head games, the result of the first game on the home ice of the team with the extra home game is discarded; 6) Greater goal differential (GD); 7) Greater number of goals scored (GF)
x – Clinched playoff spot

== Schedule and results ==
=== Preseason ===
The preseason schedule was released on June 21, 2024.

2024 preseason game log: 3–2–1 (home: 3–0–0; road: 0–2–1)
#	Date	Visitor	Score	Home	OT	Decision	Attendance	Record	Recap
1	September 24	Seattle	1–3	Vancouver		Silovs	18,519	1–0–0
2^{[a]}	September 25	Calgary	3–4	Vancouver	OT	Patera	6,534	2–0–0
3	September 27	Vancouver	1–3	Seattle		Lankinen	17,151	2–1–0
4	September 28	Vancouver	2–4	Calgary		Silovs	15,978	2–2–0
5	September 30	Vancouver	2–3	Edmonton	SO	Lankinen	13,998	2–2–1
6	October 4	Edmonton	1–4	Vancouver		Silovs	18,850	3–2–1
Notes:^{a} Game was played at Abbotsford Centre in Abbotsford, British Columbia.

=== Regular season ===
The regular season schedule was released on July 2, 2024.

2024–25 game log

October: 4–2–3 (Home: 1–1–3; Road: 3–1–0)
#	Date	Visitor	Score	Home	OT	Decision	Attendance	Record	Pts	Recap
1	October 9	Calgary	6–5	Vancouver	OT	Silovs	18,850	0–0–1	1
2	October 11	Philadelphia	3–2	Vancouver	SO	Lankinen	18,875	0–0–2	2
3	October 15	Vancouver	1–4	Tampa Bay		Silovs	19,092	0–1–2	2
4	October 17	Vancouver	3–2	Florida	OT	Lankinen	17,865	1–1–2	4
5	October 19	Vancouver	3–0	Philadelphia		Lankinen	19,083	2–1–2	6
6	October 22	Vancouver	6–3	Chicago		Lankinen	17,118	3–1–2	8
7	October 26	Pittsburgh	3–4	Vancouver		Lankinen	18,748	4–1–2	10
8	October 28	Carolina	4–3	Vancouver	OT	Lankinen	18,682	4–1–3	11
9	October 30	New Jersey	6–0	Vancouver		Silovs	18,717	4–2–3	11

November: 8–5–0 (Home: 2–4–0; Road: 6–1–0)
#	Date	Visitor	Score	Home	OT	Decision	Attendance	Record	Pts	Recap
10	November 2	Vancouver	3–2	San Jose		Lankinen	17,435	5–2–3	13
11	November 5	Vancouver	5–1	Anaheim		Lankinen	13,538	6–2–3	15
12	November 7	Vancouver	4–2	Los Angeles		Lankinen	17,855	7–2–3	17
13	November 9	Edmonton	7–3	Vancouver		Lankinen	18,714	7–3–3	17
14	November 12	Calgary	1–3	Vancouver		Lankinen	18,781	8–3–3	19
15	November 14	NY Islanders	5–2	Vancouver		Lankinen	18,728	8–4–3	19
16	November 16	Chicago	1–4	Vancouver		Silovs	18,620	9–4–3	21
17	November 17	Nashville	5–3	Vancouver		Lankinen	18,587	9–5–3	21
18	November 19	NY Rangers	4–3	Vancouver		Silovs	18,688	9–6–3	21
19	November 23	Vancouver	4–3	Ottawa		Lankinen	18,995	10–6–3	23
20	November 26	Vancouver	2–0	Boston		Lankinen	17,850	11–6–3	25
21	November 27	Vancouver	4–5	Pittsburgh		Silovs	16,016	11–7–3	25
22	November 29	Vancouver	4–3	Buffalo	OT	Lankinen	18,059	12–7–3	27

December: 5–4–5 (Home: 4–2–3; Road: 1–2–2)
#	Date	Visitor	Score	Home	OT	Decision	Attendance	Record	Pts	Recap
23	December 1	Vancouver	5–4	Detroit	OT	Lankinen	19,515	13–7–3	29
24	December 3	Vancouver	2–3	Minnesota	OT	Lankinen	18,076	13–7–4	30
25	December 6	Columbus	2–5	Vancouver		Lankinen	18,529	14–7–4	32
26	December 8	Tampa Bay	4–2	Vancouver		Lankinen	18,290	14–8–4	32
27	December 10	St. Louis	4–3	Vancouver	OT	Demko	18,754	14–8–5	33
28	December 12	Florida	0–4	Vancouver		Lankinen	18,614	15–8–5	35
29	December 14	Boston	5–1	Vancouver		Demko	18,787	15–9–5	35
30	December 16	Colorado	1–3	Vancouver		Demko	18,856	16–9–5	37
31	December 18	Vancouver	2–3	Utah	OT	Demko	11,131	16–9–6	38
32	December 19	Vancouver	1–3	Vegas		Lankinen	17,779	16–10–6	38
33	December 21	Ottawa	5–4	Vancouver	OT	Lankinen	18,940	16–10–7	39
34	December 23	San Jose	3–4	Vancouver		Demko	18,791	17–10–7	41
35	December 28	Seattle	5–4	Vancouver	OT	Demko	18,905	17–10–8	42
36	December 31	Vancouver	1–3	Calgary		Lankinen	19,289	17–11–8	42

January: 6–7–2 (Home: 2–3–0; Road: 4–4–2)
#	Date	Visitor	Score	Home	OT	Decision	Attendance	Record	Pts	Recap
37	January 2	Vancouver	4–3	Seattle	SO	Lankinen	17,151	18–11–8	44
38	January 3	Nashville	3–0	Vancouver		Lankinen	18,894	18–12–8	44
39	January 6	Vancouver	4–5	Montreal	OT	Lankinen	21,105	18–12–9	45
40	January 8	Vancouver	1–2	Washington	OT	Lankinen	17,941	18–12–10	46
41	January 10	Vancouver	0–2	Carolina		Demko	18,700	18–13–10	46
42	January 11	Vancouver	3–0	Toronto		Lankinen	19,104	19–13–10	48
43	January 14	Vancouver	1–6	Winnipeg		Lankinen	14,050	19–14–10	48
44	January 16	Los Angeles	5–1	Vancouver		Demko	18,913	19–15–10	48
45	January 18	Edmonton	2–3	Vancouver		Demko	18,965	20–15–10	50
46	January 21	Buffalo	3–2	Vancouver		Demko	19,064	20–16–10	50
47	January 23	Vancouver	2–6	Edmonton		Demko	18,347	20–17–10	50
48	January 25	Washington	1–2	Vancouver		Lankinen	18,876	21–17–10	52
49	January 27	Vancouver	5–2	St. Louis		Lankinen	17,445	22–17–10	54
50	January 29	Vancouver	3–1	Nashville		Demko	17,159	23–17–10	56
51	January 31	Vancouver	3–5	Dallas		Demko	18,532	23–18–10	56

February: 4–3–1 (Home: 2–0–1; Road: 2–3–0)
#	Date	Visitor	Score	Home	OT	Decision	Attendance	Record	Pts	Recap
52	February 2	Detroit	3–2	Vancouver	OT	Lankinen	18,872	23–18–11	57
53	February 4	Colorado	0–3	Vancouver		Demko	18,924	24–18–11	59
54	February 6	Vancouver	2–1	San Jose	OT	Demko	11,509	25–18–11	61
55	February 8	Toronto	1–2	Vancouver		Lankinen	19,022	26–18–11	63
56	February 22	Vancouver	1–3	Vegas		Lankinen	18,309	26–19–11	63
57	February 23	Vancouver	1–2	Utah		Silovs	11,131	26–20–11	63
58	February 26	Vancouver	3–2	Los Angeles	OT	Lankinen	15,470	27–20–11	65
59	February 27	Vancouver	2–5	Anaheim		Silovs	17,174	27–21–11	65

March: 7–6–2 (Home: 4–3–0; Road: 3–3–2)
#	Date	Visitor	Score	Home	OT	Decision	Attendance	Record	Pts	Recap
60	March 1	Vancouver	3–6	Seattle		Lankinen	17,151	27–22–11	65
61	March 5	Anaheim	2–3	Vancouver		Lankinen	18,865	28–22–11	67
62	March 7	Minnesota	1–3	Vancouver		Lankinen	18,885	29–22–11	69
63	March 9	Dallas	4–1	Vancouver		Lankinen	18,656	29–23–11	69
64	March 11	Montreal	4–2	Vancouver		Lankinen	18,886	29–24–11	69
65	March 12	Vancouver	4–3	Calgary	SO	Lankinen	18,805	30–24–11	71
66	March 15	Chicago	2–6	Vancouver		Silovs	18,847	31–24–11	73
67	March 16	Utah	3–1	Vancouver		Lankinen	18,804	31–25–11	73
68	March 18	Winnipeg	2–6	Vancouver		Lankinen	18,968	32–25–11	75
69	March 20	Vancouver	3–4	St. Louis	OT	Lankinen	18,096	32–25–12	76
70	March 22	Vancouver	3–5	NY Rangers		Lankinen	18,006	32–26–12	76
71	March 24	Vancouver	4–3	New Jersey	SO	Demko	16,113	33–26–12	78
72	March 26	Vancouver	5–2	NY Islanders		Demko	15,254	34–26–12	80
73	March 28	Vancouver	6–7	Columbus	SO	Lankinen	18,586	34–26–13	81
74	March 30	Vancouver	1–3	Winnipeg		Demko	15,225	34–27–13	81

April: 4–3–1 (Home: 2–3–1; Road: 2–0–0)
#	Date	Visitor	Score	Home	OT	Decision	Attendance	Record	Pts	Recap
75	April 2	Seattle	5–0	Vancouver		Demko	18,914	34–28–13	81
76	April 5	Anaheim	2–6	Vancouver		Demko	18,914	35–28–13	83
77	April 6	Vegas	3–2	Vancouver		Lankinen	18,807	35–29–13	83
78	April 8	Vancouver	6–5	Dallas	OT	Demko	18,532	36–29–13	85
79	April 10	Vancouver	4–1	Colorado		Lankinen	18,092	37–29–13	87
80	April 12	Minnesota	3–2	Vancouver	OT	Lankinen	18,844	37–29–14	88
81	April 14	San Jose	1–2	Vancouver	OT	Tolopilo	18,908	38–29–14	90
82	April 16	Vegas	4–1	Vancouver		Tolopilo	18,942	38–30–14	90

Legend: Win (2 points) Loss (0 points) Overtime/shootout loss (1 point)

== Player statistics ==
=== Skaters ===
Regular season
Player	GP	G	A	Pts	+/−	PIM
Quinn Hughes	68	16	60	76	+2	29
Brock Boeser	75	25	25	50	−25	16
Conor Garland	81	19	31	50	−13	52
Jake DeBrusk	82	28	20	48	−15	18
Pius Suter	81	25	21	46	+2	18
Elias Pettersson	64	15	30	45	−10	14
Kiefer Sherwood	78	19	21	40	−1	35
J. T. Miller^{‡}	40	9	26	35	−4	37
Filip Hronek	61	5	28	33	0	40
Teddy Blueger	82	8	18	26	−7	39
Nils Hoglander	72	8	17	25	+5	30
Tyler Myers	71	6	18	24	+2	74
Danton Heinen^{‡}	51	6	12	18	−1	31
Dakota Joshua	57	7	7	14	−13	38
Aatu Raty	33	7	4	11	−1	14
Derek Forbort	54	2	9	11	−7	45
Marcus Pettersson^{†}	31	1	10	11	+8	20
Carson Soucy^{‡}	59	3	7	10	−13	42
Drew O'Connor^{†}	31	4	5	9	−2	18
Erik Brannstrom^{‡}	28	3	5	8	−4	17
Max Sasson	29	3	4	7	+1	0
Linus Karlsson	23	3	3	6	+5	6
Jonathan Lekkerimaki	24	3	3	6	−6	2
Filip Chytil^{†}	15	2	4	6	−11	4
Phillip Di Giuseppe	20	1	5	6	−2	4
Nils Aman	19	1	5	6	−2	2
Daniel Sprong^{‡}	9	1	2	3	−2	2
Elias Pettersson	28	1	2	3	−4	17
Victor Mancini^{†}	16	1	2	3	−6	8
Vincent Desharnais^{‡}	34	0	3	3	−5	34
Arshdeep Bains	13	1	0	1	−5	0
Mark Friedman^{‡}	5	0	0	0	−4	10
Noah Juulsen	35	0	0	0	−12	21
Guillaume Brisebois	2	0	0	0	0	0
Kirill Kudryavtsev	3	0	0	0	+1	0
Ty Mueller	2	0	0	0	0	2

=== Goaltenders ===
Regular season
Player	GP	GS	TOI	W	L	OT	GA	GAA	SA	SV%	SO	G	A	PIM
Kevin Lankinen	51	49	3019:47	25	15	10	132	2.62	1,345	.902	4	0	1	0
Thatcher Demko	23	23	1301:58	10	8	3	63	2.90	569	.889	1	0	0	0
Arturs Silovs	10	9	542:31	2	6	1	33	3.65	238	.861	0	0	0	2
Nikita Tolopilo	2	1	83:39	1	1	0	3	2.15	24	.875	0	0	0	0

^{†}Denotes player spent time with another team before joining the Canucks. Stats reflect time with the Canucks only.
^{‡}Denotes player was traded mid-season. Stats reflect time with the Canucks only.
Bold/italics denotes franchise record.

== Awards and honours ==
=== Awards ===
Regular season
Player	Award	Awarded	Ref
Quinn Hughes	NHL Second Star of the Week	December 2, 2024	
Thatcher Demko	NHL Second Star of the Week	February 10, 2025	

=== Milestones ===
Regular season
Player	Milestone	Reached	Ref
J. T. Miller	800th career NHL game	October 9, 2024	
Tyler Myers	1000th career NHL game	October 19, 2024	
Arshdeep Bains	1st career NHL goal 1st career NHL point	October 26, 2024	
Derek Forbort	500th career NHL game	November 2, 2024	
Filip Hronek	400th career NHL game	November 2, 2024	
Carson Soucy	300th career NHL game	November 2, 2024	
Quinn Hughes	300th career NHL assist	November 5, 2024	
Danton Heinen	500th career NHL game	November 9, 2024	
Kiefer Sherwood	200th career NHL game	November 9, 2024	
Jonathan Lekkerimaki	1st career NHL game	November 12, 2024	
Jonathan Lekkerimaki	1st career NHL goal 1st career NHL point	November 14, 2024	
Pius Suter	300th career NHL game	November 19, 2024	
Max Sasson	1st career NHL game 1st career NHL assist 1st career NHL point	November 23, 2024	
Jake DeBrusk	2nd career NHL hat-trick	December 1, 2024	
Brock Boeser	400th career NHL point	December 6, 2024	
Brock Boeser	500th career NHL game	December 12, 2024	
Max Sasson	1st career NHL goal	December 14, 2024	
Dakota Joshua	200th career NHL game	December 16, 2024	
Kiefer Sherwood	1st career NHL hat-trick	December 16, 2024	
Jake DeBrusk	500th career NHL game	December 28, 2024	
Quinn Hughes	400th career NHL game	January 6, 2025	
Jonathan Lekkerimaki	1st career NHL assist	January 6, 2025	
Elias Pettersson (b. 2004)	1st career NHL game	January 25, 2025	
Nils Hoglander	100th career NHL point	January 25, 2025	
Phillip Di Giuseppe	300th career NHL game	January 27, 2025	
Linus Karlsson	1st career NHL goal 1st career NHL point	January 29, 2025	
Elias Pettersson (b. 2004)	1st career NHL assist 1st career NHL point	February 2, 2025	
Derek Forbort	100th career NHL point	February 8, 2025	
Jake DeBrusk	300th career NHL point	February 22, 2025	
Teddy Blueger	400th career NHL game	March 11, 2025	
Teddy Blueger	100th career NHL assist	March 18, 2025	
Brock Boeser	200th career NHL goal	March 20, 2025	
Quinn Hughes	400th career NHL point	March 22, 2025	
Elias Pettersson (b. 2004)	1st career NHL goal	April 5, 2025	
Linus Karlsson	1st career NHL assist	April 5, 2025	
Ty Mueller	1st career NHL game	April 12, 2025	
Kirill Kudryavtsev	1st career NHL game	April 14, 2025	
Nikita Tolopilo	1st career NHL game 1st career NHL win	April 14, 2025	

=== Records ===
Regular season
Player	Record	Date	Ref
Quinn Hughes	Most career assists by a Canucks defenceman	December 1, 2024	
Kevin Lankinen	Most consecutive road wins to open a season in NHL history	December 1, 2024	

== Transactions ==
The Canucks have been involved in the following transactions during the 2024–25 season.

Key:

† Contract is entry-level.
‡ Contract initially takes effect in the 2025–26 season.

=== Trades ===
Date	Details		Ref
August 18, 2024	To Edmonton Oilers Vasily Podkolzin	To Vancouver Canucks OTT 4th-round pick in 2025	
October 6, 2024	To Colorado Avalanche Tucker Poolman^{1} 4th-round pick in 2025	To Vancouver Canucks Erik Brannstrom	
November 8, 2024	To Seattle Kraken Daniel Sprong	To Vancouver Canucks Future considerations	
January 31, 2025	To New York Rangers Erik Brannstrom; Jackson Dorrington; J. T. Miller	To Vancouver Canucks Filip Chytil; Victor Mancini conditional 1st-round pick in 2025 or 2026^{2}	
January 31, 2025	To Pittsburgh Penguins Vincent Desharnais; Melvin Fernstrom; Danton Heinen; NYR 1st-round pick in 2025^{2}	To Vancouver Canucks Drew O'Connor; Marcus Pettersson	
February 7, 2025	To Nashville Predators Mark Friedman	To Vancouver Canucks Future considerations	
March 6, 2025	To New York Rangers Carson Soucy	To Vancouver Canucks SJS 3rd–round pick in 2025	
June 25, 2025	To Edmonton Oilers OTT 4th-round pick in 2025	To Vancouver Canucks Evander Kane	

Notes

- Canucks retain 20% of Poolman's remaining salary.
- This pick is top-13 protected, Pittsburgh will receive New York's first-round pick in 2025 if it's outside the top-13; otherwise it becomes a first-round pick in 2026.

=== Players acquired ===
Date	Player	Former team	Term	Via	Ref
July 1, 2024	Jake DeBrusk	Boston Bruins	7-year	Free agency	
July 1, 2024	Danton Heinen	Boston Bruins	2-year	Free agency	
July 1, 2024	Derek Forbort	Boston Bruins	1-year	Free agency	
July 1, 2024	Vincent Desharnais	Edmonton Oilers	2-year	Free agency	
July 1, 2024	Jiri Patera	Vegas Golden Knights	2-year	Free agency	
July 1, 2024	Kiefer Sherwood	Nashville Predators	2-year	Free agency	
July 1, 2024	Nathan Smith	Utah Hockey Club	1-year	Free agency	
July 20, 2024	Daniel Sprong	Detroit Red Wings	1-year	Free agency	
September 21, 2024	Kevin Lankinen	Nashville Predators	1-year	Free agency	
October 7, 2024	Jiri Patera	Boston Bruins		Waivers	
May 22, 2025	Anri Ravinskis	HPK (Liiga)	2–year†‡	Free agency	

=== Players lost ===
Date	Player	New team	Term	Via	Ref
July 1, 2024	Elias Lindholm	Boston Bruins	7-year	Free agency	
July 1, 2024	Nikita Zadorov	Boston Bruins	6-year	Free agency	
July 1, 2024	Ian Cole	Utah Hockey Club	1-year	Free agency	
July 1, 2024	Casey DeSmith	Dallas Stars	3-year	Free agency	
July 1, 2024	Sheldon Dries	Detroit Red Wings	2-year	Free agency	
July 5, 2024	Aidan McDonough	Charlotte Checkers (AHL)	1-year	Free agency	
July 7, 2024	Zach Sawchenko	Columbus Blue Jackets	1-year	Free agency	
July 18, 2024	Nick Cicek	Adler Mannheim (DEL)	1-year	Free agency	
October 2, 2024	Jiri Patera	Boston Bruins		Waivers	

=== Signings ===
Date	Player	Term	Ref
July 16, 2024	Arturs Silovs	2-year	
September 29, 2024	Vilmer Alriksson	3-year†	
October 6, 2024	Nils Hoglander	3-year‡	
February 5, 2025	Marcus Pettersson	6-year‡	
February 18, 2025	Drew O'Connor	2-year‡	
February 21, 2025	Kevin Lankinen	5-year‡	
March 14, 2025	Linus Karlsson	1–year‡	
March 18, 2025	Aku Koskenuvo	2-year†	
May 14, 2025	Tom Willander	3–year†‡	
June 3, 2025	Derek Forbort	1-year‡	

== Draft picks ==
Below are the Vancouver Canucks' selections at the 2024 NHL entry draft, which was held on June 28 to 29, 2024, at the Sphere in Las Vegas, Nevada.

Round	#	Player	Pos	Nationality	College/Junior/Club (League)
3	93	Melvin Fernstrom	RW	Sweden	Örebro HK (J20 Nationell)
4	125	Riley Patterson	C	Canada	Barrie Colts (OHL)
6	162 (Note: The San Jose Sharks' sixth-round pick will go to the Vancouver Canucks as the result of a trade on December 15, 2023, that sent Jack Studnicka to San Jose in exchange for Nick Cicek and this pick.)	Anthony Romani	RW	Canada	North Bay Battalion (OHL)
6	189	Parker Alcos	D	Canada	Edmonton Oil Kings (WHL)
7	221	Basile Sansonnens	D	Switzerland	HC Fribourg-Gottéron (U20-Elit)
