= DeBrusk =

DeBrusk is a surname. Notable people with the surname include:

- Jake DeBrusk (born 1996), Canadian ice hockey player
- Louie DeBrusk (born 1971), Canadian ice hockey player and commentator, father of Jake
