= 2024–25 Seattle Kraken season =

National Hockey League season

2024–25 Seattle Kraken
- Division: 7th Pacific
- Conference: 13th Western
- 2024–25 record: 35–41–6
- Home record: 18–18–5
- Road record: 17–23–1
- Goals for: 247
- Goals against: 265

Team information
- General manager: Ron Francis
- Coach: Dan Bylsma
- Captain: Jordan Eberle
- Alternate captains: Matty Beniers; Yanni Gourde (Oct. 8 – Mar. 5); Adam Larsson; Jaden Schwartz
- Arena: Climate Pledge Arena
- Average attendance: 17,151
- Minor league affiliates: Coachella Valley Firebirds (AHL); Kansas City Mavericks (ECHL)

Team leaders
- Goals: Jaden Schwartz (26)
- Assists: Jared McCann (39)
- Points: Jared McCann (61)
- Penalty minutes: Brandon Montour (70)
- Plus/minus: Adam Larsson (+22)
- Wins: Joey Daccord (27)
- Goals against average: Victor Ostman (0.00)

The 2024–25 Seattle Kraken season was the fourth season for the National Hockey League (NHL) franchise. They played their home games at Climate Pledge Arena. For the second consecutive season, the team did not qualify for the Stanley Cup playoffs.

Dan Bylsma was the Kraken's new head coach, replacing Dave Hakstol, who was fired after the end of the previous season. The Kraken fired Bylsma after the end of the season.

== Background ==
=== Previous season ===
During the Kraken's previous season, the team scored 217 goals, ranking 29th in the league. The team was eliminated from playoff contention on April 3, 2024. The team ended their season with a 34–35–13 record and 81 points.

=== After the end of the season (April–June) ===
On April 25, the Kraken signed a deal with Tegna, owners of Seattle NBC affiliate KING-TV and independent KONG, to air their games throughout their territory, with streaming handled by Prime Video. This was a departure from Root Sports, who had handled the Kraken's television coverage for the past three seasons. Four days later, the team's head coach, Dave Hakstol was fired, along with Kraken assistant coach Paul McFarland. This made Hakstol the 10th NHL head coach to get fired following the 2023–24 season.

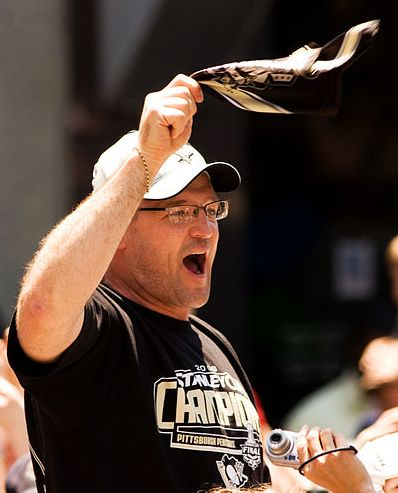
Dan Bylsma was named the Seattle Kraken's head coach on May 28, 2024.

Nearly a month later on May 28, the Kraken organization made the decision to replace Hakstol with the Kraken's American Hockey League (AHL) affiliate Coachella Valley Firebirds head coach Dan Bylsma.

One month later, the first round of the 2024 NHL entry draft held at the Sphere in Paradise, Nevada, commenced. The Kraken used their eighth-overall pick to select center Berkly Catton, selected from the Washington-based Spokane Chiefs of the Western Hockey League (WHL). Catton had been placed eighth in the final NHL North American skater rankings for the draft, mainly due to his career-best 54 goals and 62 assists for 116 points during the 2023–24 season. The next day, rounds 2–7 of the draft took place. The Kraken spent their second-round 40th overall pick on Julius Miettinen of the WHL's Everett Silvertips. Also in the second round, the Kraken selected Nathan Villeneuve 63rd overall. Villeneuve played with the Ontario Hockey League (OHL)'s Sudbury Wolves, captained by fellow Kraken prospect David Goyette. With their third-round 73rd overall pick, the Kraken selected their first defenseman of the draft Alexis Bernier, of the Baie-Comeau Drakkar of the Quebec Maritimes Junior Hockey League (QMJHL). Bernier's father, David, was drafted into the NHL twice, and played as a forward. The Kraken used another third-round selection to select their first goaltender of the draft, Kim Saarinen, 88th overall. Saarinen's 6'4" stature as well as his ability to track the puck are some of the reasons he was selected. The Kraken used their 105th overall fourth-round selection to select Ollie Josephson, who at some point was a member of Team Canada at the Hlinka Gretzky Cup, along with Berkly Catton. Before the fifth round, the Kraken traded their 169th overall (sixth round) and 201st overall (seventh round) picks to the Florida Panthers, in exchange for their 141st overall fifth-round pick. The Kraken ultimately used this pick to select Clarke Caswell, a childhood friend of Berkly Catton. The Kraken used their last pick, 202nd overall in the seventh round, to select Jakub Fibigr.

== Off-season ==
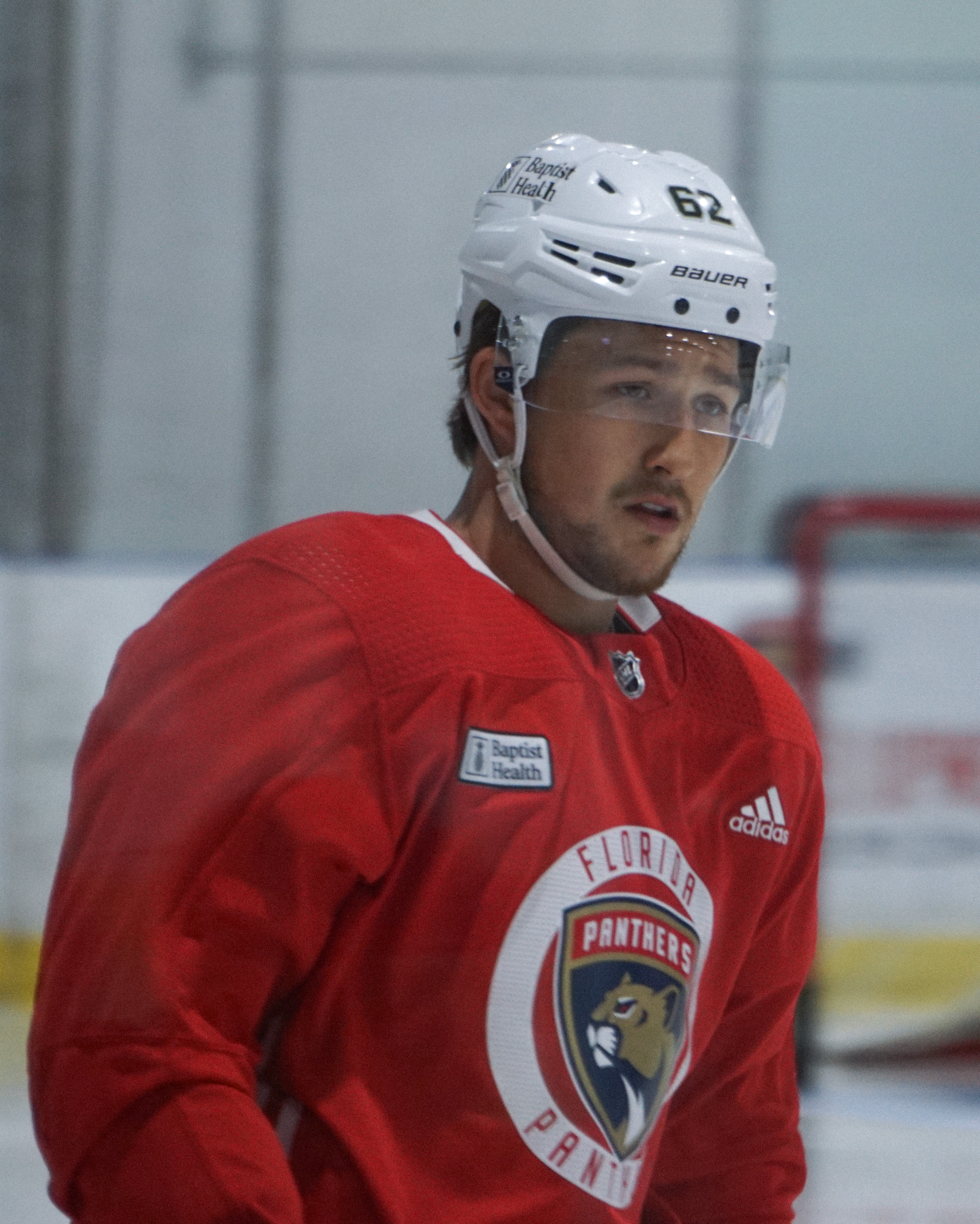
Brandon Montour

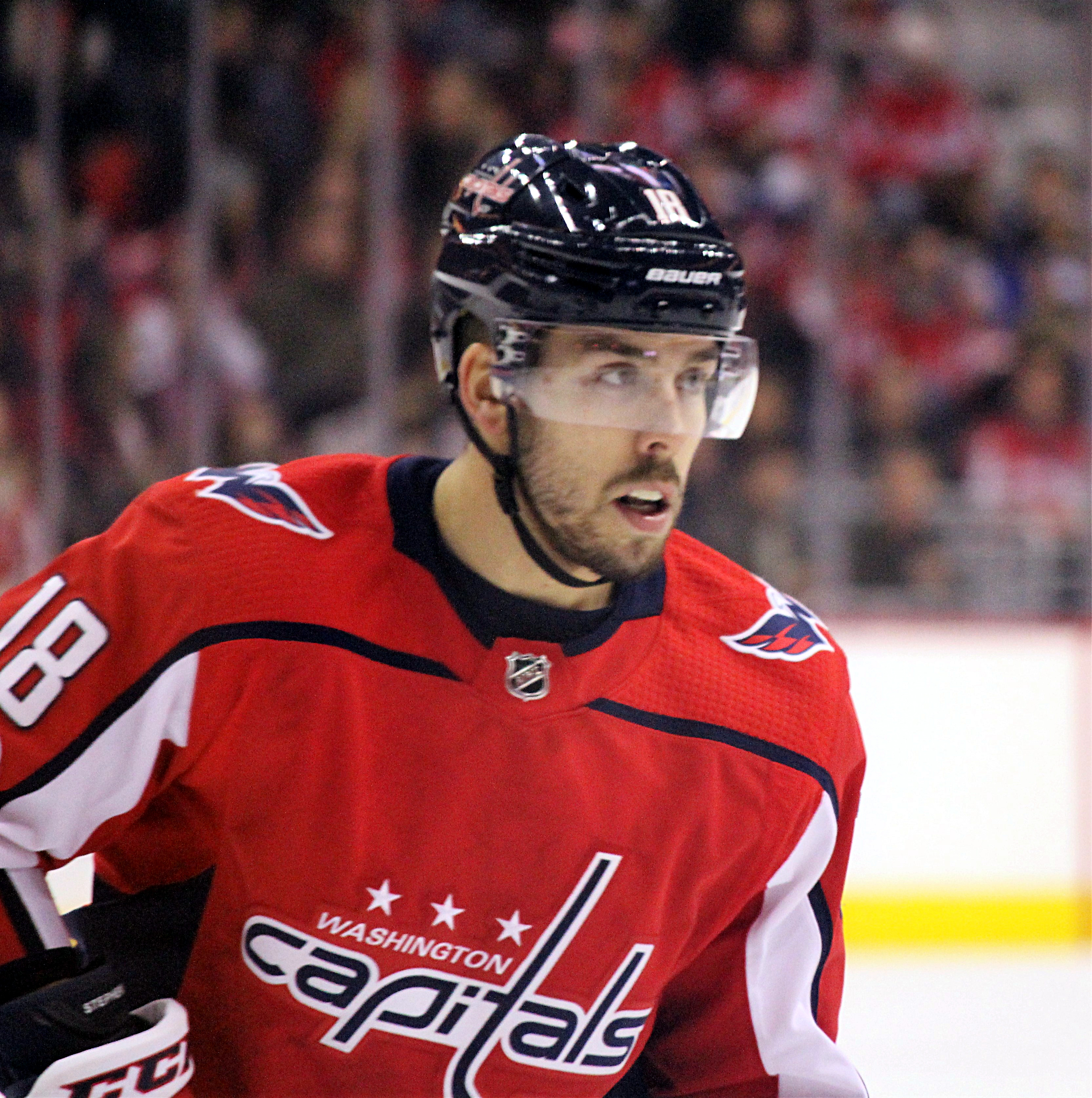
Chandler Stephenson

Brandon Montour and Chandler Stephenson seen with the Florida Panthers and Washington Capitals, respectively

On the morning of July 1, 2024, 40 minutes after the start of free agency, the Kraken signed Florida Panthers defenseman Brandon Montour to a seven-year, $50 million contract. A few hours later, the team signed Vegas Golden Knights center Chandler Stephenson to a seven-year, $43.75 million contract. In the afternoon, the Kraken signed five new players—Ben Meyers, Mitchell Stephens, Brandon Biro, Nikolas Brouillard, and Maxime Lajoie.

The next day, the team traded defenseman Brian Dumoulin to the Anaheim Ducks for a fourth-round pick in the 2026 NHL entry draft. The previous season, Dumoulin had managed 16 points through 80 games, averaging 17:01 of ice time per game.

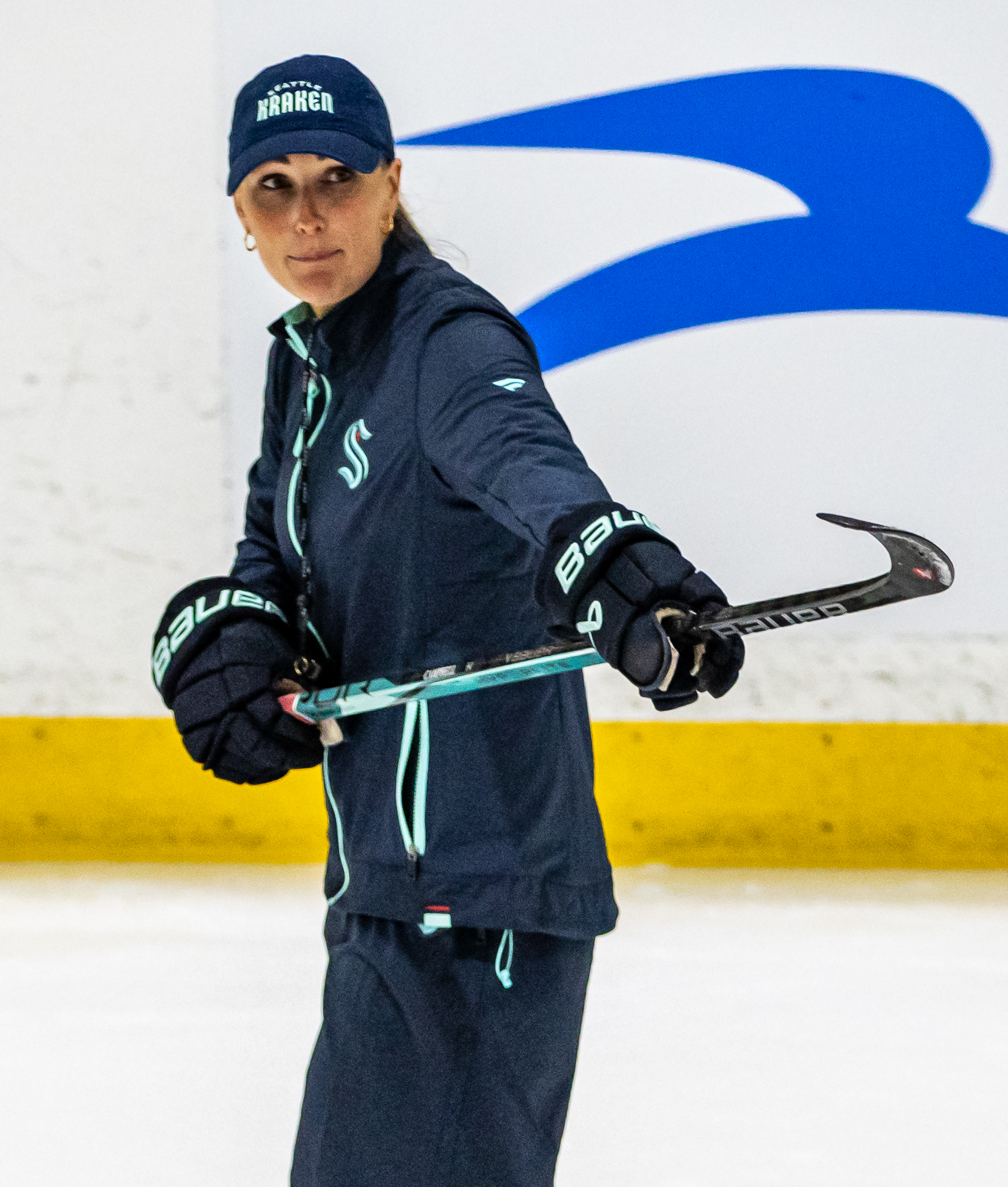
Jessica Campbell at the Seattle Kraken development camp

On the morning of July 3, the Kraken made history by hiring Jessica Campbell as an assistant coach. This made her the first woman to be in a coaching position in the NHL. Campbell had spent the previous two seasons with the Firebirds, helping them reach the Calder Cup Finals twice. Bob Woods also joined the Kraken's coaching staff, ultimately teaming him and Campbell with assistant coach Dave Lowry. Later in the day, the team signed Panthers defenseman Josh Mahura to a one-year, $775,000 contract. Kraken general manager Ron Francis himself stated that "Josh is a veteran defenseman who adds depth and experience to our blue line."

Two days later, the Kraken signed their 2024 first-round draft pick Berkly Catton to a three-year, entry-level contract. In the afternoon, the team re-signed restricted free agent Eeli Tolvanen to a two-year, $6.95 million contract.

On July 14, the Kraken signed their only goaltender selection of the 2024 draft, Kim Saarinen, to a three-year, entry-level contract.

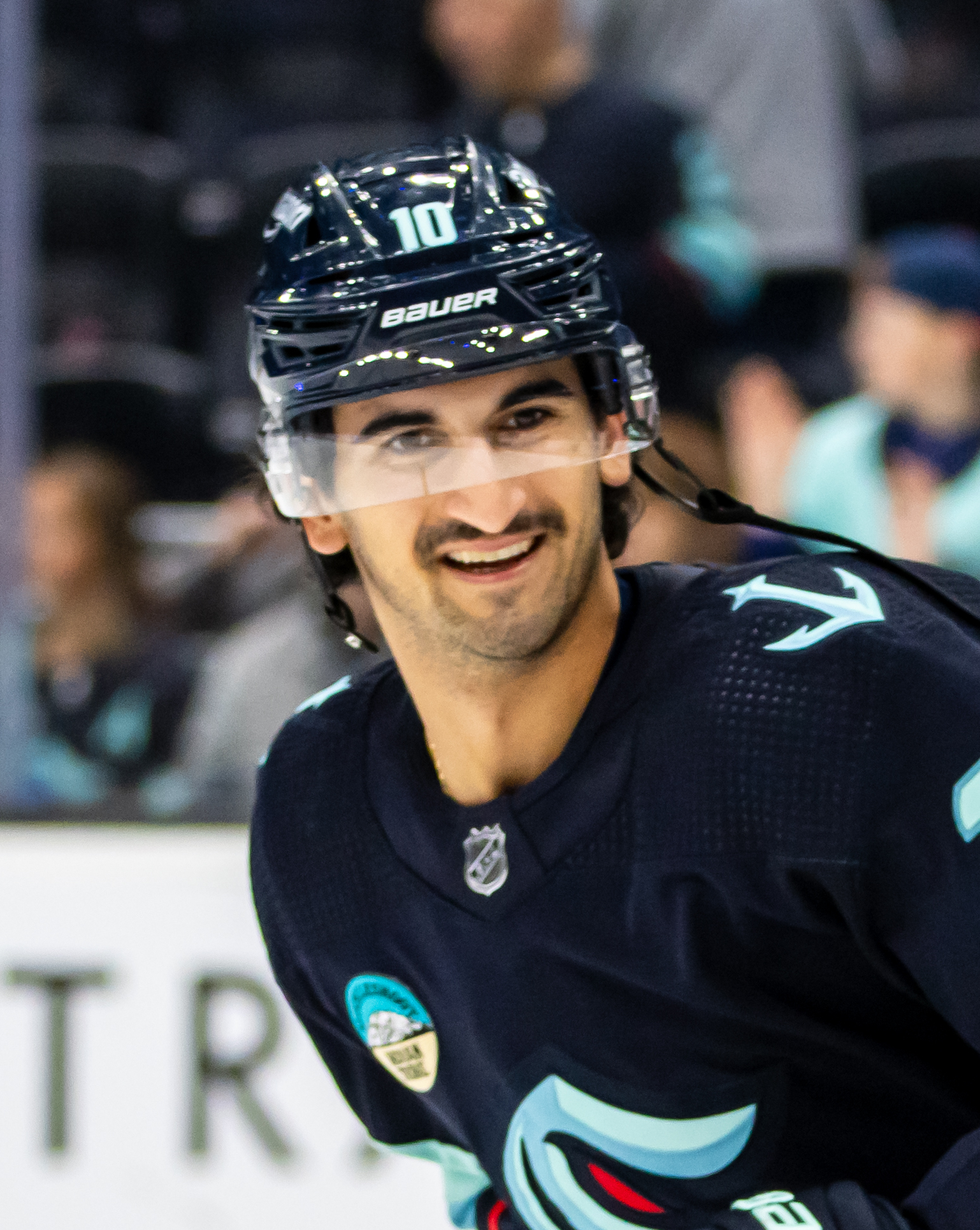
Matty Beniers seen playing with the Kraken

More than a month later on August 20, the Kraken re-signed yet another, restricted free agent, center Matty Beniers, to a seven-year, $49.98 million contract. Beniers was the franchise's first ever draft pick, and he won the Calder Memorial Trophy as NHL rookie of the year with the team after the end of the 2022–23 season.

On September 10, the Kraken re-signed defenseman Adam Larsson to a four-year, $21 million contract. The previous season, he had 18 points though 81 games.

Six days later, the team announced the Kraken Hockey Network (KHN), a television network which includes over-the-air television stations in Seattle (KING-TV and KONG), Spokane (KREM and KSKN), and Yakima (KAPP and KVEW), Washington; Eugene (KEVU and KLSR-TV) and Portland (KGW), Oregon; and Anchorage (KAUU) and Juneau (KYEX-LD), Alaska.

== Preseason ==
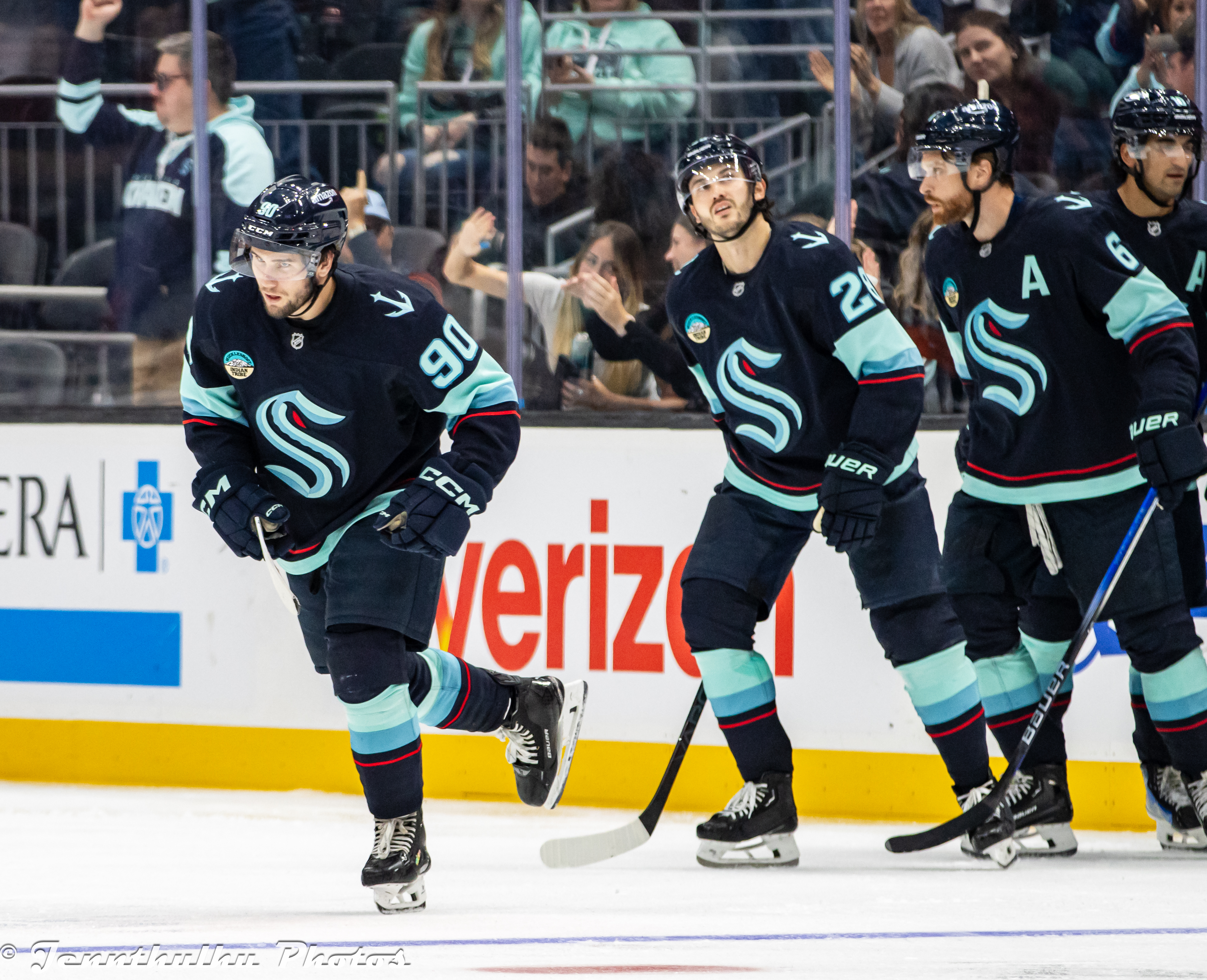
Villeneuve and others after celebrating his goal

On September 18, the Kraken began their annual training camp. On September 22, the Kraken hosted the Calgary Flames first game of their preseason. Kraken draft pick Nathan Villeneuve scored his first-ever and only preseason goal, the only Kraken goal of what would be a 6–1 loss. On September 24, the Kraken took on the host Vancouver Canucks, where the Kraken's Ben Meyers scored off a pass from Jaden Schwartz, the only Kraken goal in a 3–1 loss.

== Standings ==
=== Divisional standings ===
Pacific Division
Pos	Team	GP	W	L	OTL	RW	GF	GA	GD	Pts
1	y – Vegas Golden Knights	82	50	22	10	46	275	219	+56	110
2	x – Los Angeles Kings	82	48	25	9	43	250	206	+44	105
3	x – Edmonton Oilers	82	48	29	5	36	259	236	+23	101
4	Calgary Flames	82	41	27	14	31	225	238	−13	96
5	Vancouver Canucks	82	38	30	14	28	236	253	−17	90
6	Anaheim Ducks	82	35	37	10	24	221	263	−42	80
7	Seattle Kraken	82	35	41	6	28	247	265	−18	76
8	San Jose Sharks	82	20	50	12	14	210	315	−105	52

Source: National Hockey League
Rules for classification: 1) Fewer number of games played (GP, only during regular season); 2) Greater number of regulation wins (RW); 3) Greater number of wins in regulation and overtime, excluding shootout wins (ROW); 4) Greater number of total wins, including shootouts (W); 5) Greater number of points earned in head-to-head play; if teams played an uneven number of head-to-head games, the result of the first game on the home ice of the team with the extra home game is discarded; 6) Greater goal differential (GD); 7) Greater number of goals scored (GF)
x – Clinched playoff spot; y – Clinched division

=== Conference standings ===
Western Conference Wild Card
Pos	Div	Team	GP	W	L	OTL	RW	GF	GA	GD	Pts
1	CE	x – Minnesota Wild	82	45	30	7	33	228	239	−11	97
2	CE	x – St. Louis Blues	82	44	30	8	32	254	233	+21	96
3	PA	Calgary Flames	82	41	27	14	31	225	238	−13	96
4	PA	Vancouver Canucks	82	38	30	14	28	236	253	−17	90
5	CE	Utah Hockey Club	82	38	31	13	30	241	251	−10	89
6	PA	Anaheim Ducks	82	35	37	10	24	221	263	−42	80
7	PA	Seattle Kraken	82	35	41	6	28	247	265	−18	76
8	CE	Nashville Predators	82	30	44	8	24	214	274	−60	68
9	CE	Chicago Blackhawks	82	25	46	11	20	226	296	−70	61
10	PA	San Jose Sharks	82	20	50	12	14	210	315	−105	52

Source: National Hockey League
Rules for classification: 1) Fewer number of games played (GP, only during regular season); 2) Greater number of regulation wins (RW); 3) Greater number of wins in regulation and overtime, excluding shootout wins (ROW); 4) Greater number of total wins, including shootouts (W); 5) Greater number of points earned in head-to-head play; if teams played an uneven number of head-to-head games, the result of the first game on the home ice of the team with the extra home game is discarded; 6) Greater goal differential (GD); 7) Greater number of goals scored (GF)
x – Clinched playoff spot

== Schedule and results ==
=== Preseason ===
The Seattle Kraken's preseason schedule was released on June 26, 2024.

Seattle Kraken preseason game log featuring all six Kraken games played during the 2024–25 NHL preseason
2024 preseason game log: 2–3–1 (home: 2–1–0; road: 0–2–1)
#	Date	Visitor	Score	Home	OT	Decision	Attendance	Record	Recap
1	September 22	Calgary	6–1	Seattle		Grubauer	17,151	0–1–0
2	September 24	Seattle	1–3	Vancouver		Daccord	18,519	0–2–0
3	September 27	Vancouver	1–3	Seattle		Daccord	17,151	1–2–0
4	September 28	Seattle	4–5	Edmonton		Grubauer	14,962	1–3–0
5	September 30	Seattle	3–4	Calgary	OT	Daccord	14,605	1–3–1
6	October 2	Edmonton	2–6	Seattle		Grubauer	17,151	2–3–1

=== Regular season ===
The Seattle Kraken's regular season schedule was announced on July 2, 2024. The schedule includes a break from February 10–21, 2025, as the NHL held the 4 Nations Face-Off.

Seattle Kraken regular season game log featuring all 82 Kraken games played during the 2024–25 NHL regular season
2024–25 regular season game log: 35–41–6 (home: 18–18–5; road: 17–23–1)

October: 5–5–1 (home: 2–3–1; road: 3–2–0)
#	Date	Visitor	Score	Home	OT	Decision	Location	Attendance	Record	Pts	Recap
1	October 8	St. Louis	3–2	Seattle		Grubauer	Climate Pledge Arena	17,151	0–1–0	0
2	October 12	Seattle	5–4	Minnesota	SO	Daccord	Xcel Energy Center	18,421	1–1–0	2
3	October 13	Seattle	0–2	Dallas		Grubauer	American Airlines Center	18,532	1–2–0	2
4	October 15	Seattle	7–3	Nashville		Daccord	Bridgestone Arena	17,159	2–2–0	4
5	October 17	Philadelphia	4–6	Seattle		Grubauer	Climate Pledge Arena	17,151	3–2–0	6
6	October 19	Calgary	1–2	Seattle	OT	Daccord	Climate Pledge Arena	17,151	4–2–0	8
7	October 22	Colorado	3–2	Seattle		Grubauer	Climate Pledge Arena	17,151	4–3–0	8
8	October 24	Winnipeg	4–3	Seattle	OT	Daccord	Climate Pledge Arena	17,151	4–3–1	9
9	October 26	Carolina	4–1	Seattle		Daccord	Climate Pledge Arena	17,151	4–4–1	9
10	October 29	Seattle	8–2	Montreal		Daccord	Bell Centre	21,105	5–4–1	11
11	October 31	Seattle	1–4	Toronto		Daccord	Scotiabank Arena	18,181	5–5–1	11

November: 6–8–0 (home: 5–3–0; road: 1–5–0)
#	Date	Visitor	Score	Home	OT	Decision	Location	Attendance	Record	Pts	Recap
12	November 2	Seattle	0–3	Ottawa		Grubauer	Canadian Tire Centre	17,274	5–6–1	11
13	November 3	Seattle	0–2	Boston		Daccord	TD Garden	17,850	5–7–1	11
14	November 5	Seattle	3–6	Colorado		Grubauer	Ball Arena	18,014	5–8–1	11
15	November 8	Vegas	3–4	Seattle	OT	Daccord	Climate Pledge Arena	17,151	6–8–1	13
16	November 12	Columbus	2–5	Seattle		Daccord	Climate Pledge Arena	17,151	7–8–1	15
17	November 14	Chicago	1–3	Seattle		Daccord	Climate Pledge Arena	17,151	8–8–1	17
18	November 16	NY Islanders	2–3	Seattle		Daccord	Climate Pledge Arena	17,151	9–8–1	19
19	November 17	NY Rangers	2–0	Seattle		Grubauer	Climate Pledge Arena	17,151	9–9–1	19
20	November 20	Nashville	0–3	Seattle		Daccord	Climate Pledge Arena	17,151	10–9–1	21
21	November 23	Seattle	1–2	Los Angeles		Daccord	Crypto.com Arena	18,145	10–10–1	21
22	November 25	Seattle	3–2	Anaheim		Daccord	Honda Center	15,331	11–10–1	23
23	November 27	Anaheim	5–2	Seattle		Daccord	Climate Pledge Arena	17,151	11–11–1	23
24	November 29	Seattle	5–8	San Jose		Grubauer	SAP Center	14,795	11–12–1	23
25	November 30	San Jose	4–2	Seattle		Daccord	Climate Pledge Arena	17,151	11–13–1	23

December: 6–6–1 (home: 2–2–1; road: 4–4–0)
#	Date	Visitor	Score	Home	OT	Decision	Location	Attendance	Record	Pts	Recap
26	December 3	Seattle	4–2	Carolina		Daccord	Lenovo Center	18,700	12–13–1	25
27	December 5	Seattle	5–2	NY Islanders		Daccord	UBS Arena	14,877	13–13–1	27
28	December 6	Seattle	2–3	New Jersey		Grubauer	Prudential Center	15,582	13–14–1	27
29	December 8	Seattle	7–5	NY Rangers		Grubauer	Madison Square Garden	18,006	14–14–1	29
30	December 10	Florida	2–1	Seattle	SO	Daccord	Climate Pledge Arena	17,151	14–14–2	30
31	December 12	Boston	1–5	Seattle		Grubauer	Climate Pledge Arena	17,151	15–14–2	32
32	December 14	Tampa Bay	5–1	Seattle		Grubauer	Climate Pledge Arena	17,151	15–15–2	32
33	December 17	Ottawa	3–0	Seattle		Daccord	Climate Pledge Arena	17,151	15–16–2	32
34	December 19	Seattle	1–3	Chicago		Daccord	United Center	18,991	15–17–2	32
35	December 21	Seattle	2–6	Vegas		Grubauer	T-Mobile Arena	17,862	15–18–2	32
36	December 22	Seattle	2–5	Colorado		Daccord	Ball Arena	18,089	15–19–2	32
37	December 28	Seattle	5–4	Vancouver	OT	Grubauer	Rogers Arena	18,905	16–19–2	34
38	December 30	Utah	2–5	Seattle		Grubauer	Climate Pledge Arena	17,151	17–19–2	36

January: 6–8–1 (home: 4–4–1; road: 2–4–0)
#	Date	Visitor	Score	Home	OT	Decision	Location	Attendance	Record	Pts	Recap
39	January 2	Vancouver	4–3	Seattle	SO	Grubauer	Climate Pledge Arena	17,151	17–19–3	37
40	January 4	Edmonton	4–2	Seattle		Grubauer	Climate Pledge Arena	17,151	17–20–3	37
41	January 6	New Jersey	3–2	Seattle		Grubauer	Climate Pledge Arena	17,151	17–21–3	37
42	January 9	Seattle	2–6	Columbus		Grubauer	Nationwide Arena	15,497	17–22–3	37
43	January 11	Seattle	6–2	Buffalo		Daccord	KeyBank Center	16,759	18–22–3	39
44	January 12	Seattle	2–6	Detroit		Grubauer	Little Caesars Arena	19,515	18–23–3	39
45	January 14	Seattle	4–2	Pittsburgh		Daccord	PPG Paints Arena	16,314	19–23–3	41
46	January 16	Seattle	1–2	Winnipeg		Daccord	Canada Life Centre	13,959	19–24–3	41
47	January 18	Los Angeles	2–4	Seattle		Daccord	Climate Pledge Arena	17,151	20–24–3	43
48	January 20	Buffalo	4–6	Seattle		Daccord	Climate Pledge Arena	17,151	21–24–3	45
49	January 23	Washington	3–0	Seattle		Daccord	Climate Pledge Arena	17,151	21–25–3	45
50	January 25	Pittsburgh	1–4	Seattle		Daccord	Climate Pledge Arena	17,151	22–25–3	47
51	January 27	Seattle	2–4	Edmonton		Daccord	Rogers Place	18,347	22–26–3	47
52	January 28	Anaheim	6–4	Seattle		Grubauer	Climate Pledge Arena	17,151	22–27–3	47
53	January 30	San Jose	2–6	Seattle		Daccord	Climate Pledge Arena	17,151	23–27–3	49

February: 2–4–1 (home: 0–2–1; road: 2–2–0)
#	Date	Visitor	Score	Home	OT	Decision	Location	Attendance	Record	Pts	Recap
54	February 2	Calgary	3–2	Seattle		Daccord	Climate Pledge Arena	17,151	23–28–3	49
55	February 4	Detroit	5–4	Seattle	SO	Daccord	Climate Pledge Arena	17,151	23–28–4	50
56	February 6	Toronto	3–1	Seattle		Daccord	Climate Pledge Arena	17,151	23–29–4	50
57	February 8	Seattle	3–2	Calgary	OT	Daccord	Scotiabank Saddledome	17,795	24–29–4	52
58	February 22	Seattle	2–1	Florida		Daccord	Amerant Bank Arena	19,628	25–29–4	54
59	February 23	Seattle	1–4	Tampa Bay		Stezka	Amalie Arena	19,092	25–30–4	54
60	February 25	Seattle	2–7	St. Louis		Daccord	Enterprise Center	18,096	25–31–4	54

March: 6–7–2 (home: 4–3–1; road: 2–4–1)
#	Date	Visitor	Score	Home	OT	Decision	Location	Attendance	Record	Pts	Recap
61	March 1	Vancouver	3–6	Seattle		Daccord	Climate Pledge Arena	17,151	26–31–4	56
62	March 4	Minnesota	4–3	Seattle		Daccord	Climate Pledge Arena	17,151	26–32–4	56
63	March 6	Seattle	3–5	Nashville		Daccord	Bridgestone Arena	17,159	26–33–4	56
64	March 8	Seattle	4–1	Philadelphia		Grubauer	Wells Fargo Center	19,264	27–33–4	58
65	March 9	Seattle	2–4	Washington		Daccord	Capital One Arena	18,573	27–34–4	58
66	March 12	Montreal	4–5	Seattle	OT	Daccord	Climate Pledge Arena	17,151	28–34–4	60
67	March 14	Utah	2–4	Seattle		Grubauer	Climate Pledge Arena	17,151	29–34–4	62
68	March 16	Winnipeg	3–2	Seattle	OT	Daccord	Climate Pledge Arena	17,151	29–34–5	63
69	March 18	Seattle	6–2	Chicago		Daccord	United Center	18,505	30–34–5	65
70	March 19	Seattle	0–4	Minnesota		Grubauer	Xcel Energy Center	17,579	30–35–5	65
71	March 22	Seattle	4–5	Edmonton		Daccord	Rogers Place	18,347	30–36–5	65
72	March 25	Seattle	3–4	Calgary	OT	Daccord	Scotiabank Saddledome	14,955	30–36–6	66
73	March 27	Edmonton	1–6	Seattle		Daccord	Climate Pledge Arena	17,151	31–36–6	68
74	March 29	Dallas	5–1	Seattle		Daccord	Climate Pledge Arena	17,151	31–37–6	68
75	March 31	Dallas	3–1	Seattle		Grubauer	Climate Pledge Arena	17,151	31–38–6	68

April: 4–3–0 (home: 1–1–0; road: 3–2–0)
#	Date	Visitor	Score	Home	OT	Decision	Location	Attendance	Record	Pts	Recap
76	April 2	Seattle	5–0	Vancouver		Daccord	Rogers Arena	18,914	32–38–6	70
77	April 5	Seattle	5–1	San Jose		Daccord	SAP Center	17,435	33–38–6	72
78	April 7	Seattle	2–1	Los Angeles		Daccord	Crypto.com Arena	16,655	34–38–6	74
79	April 8	Seattle	1–7	Utah		Daccord	Delta Center	11,131	34–39–6	74
80	April 10	Seattle	1–2	Vegas		Daccord	T-Mobile Arena	17,971	34–40–6	74
81	April 12	St. Louis	3–4	Seattle	SO	Grubauer	Climate Pledge Arena	17,151	35–40–6	76
82	April 15	Los Angeles	6–5	Seattle		Daccord	Climate Pledge Arena	17,151	35–41–6	76

Legend: Win (2 points) Loss (0 points) OT/SO loss (1 point)

== Player statistics ==
=== Skaters ===
Regular season
Player	GP	G	A	Pts	+/−	PIM
Jared McCann	82	22	39	61	+8	18
Chandler Stephenson	78	13	38	51	–9	24
Jaden Schwartz	81	26	23	49	−6	24
Shane Wright	79	19	25	44	+4	18
Matty Beniers	82	20	23	43	0	14
Brandon Montour	81	18	23	41	−22	70
Vince Dunn	62	11	28	39	–3	33
Oliver Bjorkstrand^{‡}	61	16	21	37	−1	14
Andre Burakovsky	79	10	27	37	–3	12
Eeli Tolvanen	81	23	12	35	+3	23
Kaapo Kakko^{†}	49	10	20	30	–11	24
Adam Larsson	82	7	21	28	+22	31
Jordan Eberle	42	9	17	26	0	14
Ryker Evans	73	5	20	25	−12	30
Brandon Tanev^{‡}	60	9	8	17	–12	10
Yanni Gourde^{‡}	36	6	11	17	–5	36
Jamie Oleksiak	82	4	13	17	–2	34
Tye Kartye	63	6	7	13	–14	43
Josh Mahura	64	0	9	9	+5	20
Mikey Eyssimont^{†}	20	4	2	6	+1	19
Jani Nyman	12	3	3	6	–3	4
Mitchell Stephens	28	1	2	3	–8	6
Daniel Sprong^{†‡}	10	1	1	2	+1	0
John Hayden	20	1	1	2	0	31
Will Borgen^{‡}	33	1	1	2	–13	9
Ville Ottavainen	1	0	1	1	0	0
Ryan Winterton	12	0	1	1	–11	2
Cale Fleury	14	0	1	1	+1	0
Jacob Melanson	1	0	0	0	0	0
Ben Meyers	8	0	0	0	−2	2

=== Goaltenders ===
Regular season
Player	GP	GS	TOI	W	L	OT	GA	GAA	SA	SV%	SO	G	A	PIM
Joey Daccord	57	55	3,295:15	27	23	5	151	2.75	1,599	.906	2	0	2	0
Philipp Grubauer	26	26	1,460:29	8	17	1	85	3.49	628	.873	0	0	0	0
Victor Ostman	1	0	20:00	0	0	0	0	0.00	12	1.000	0	0	0	0
Nikke Kokko	1	0	29:57	0	0	0	2	4.01	6	.667	0	0	0	0
Ales Stezka	1	1	58:20	0	1	0	3	3.09	23	.870	0	0	0	0

^{†}Denotes player spent time with another team before joining the Kraken. Stats reflect time with the Kraken only.
^{‡}Denotes player was traded mid-season. Stats reflect time with the Kraken only.

== Transactions ==
The Kraken have been involved in the following transactions during the 2024–25 season.

Italics indicate contract is entry-level.

=== Trades ===
Date	Details		Ref
July 2, 2024	To Anaheim Ducks Brian Dumoulin	To Seattle Kraken 4th-round pick in 2026	
November 8, 2024	To Vancouver Canucks Future considerations	To Seattle Kraken Daniel Sprong	
December 18, 2024	To New York Rangers Will Borgen; 3rd-round pick in 2025; 6th-round pick in 2025	To Seattle Kraken Kaapo Kakko	
March 5, 2025	To Detroit Red Wings Yanni Gourde	To Seattle Kraken Kyle Aucoin	
March 5, 2025	To Tampa Bay Lightning Oliver Bjorkstrand; Kyle Aucoin; 5th-round pick in 2026	To Seattle Kraken Michael Eyssimont conditional 1st-round pick in 2026 conditional 1st-round pick in 2027; 2nd-round pick in 2025	
March 7, 2025	To Winnipeg Jets Brandon Tanev	To Seattle Kraken 2nd-round pick in 2027	
March 7, 2025	To New Jersey Devils Daniel Sprong	To Seattle Kraken 7th-round pick in 2026	
June 19, 2025	To Dallas Stars 3rd-round pick in 2026; DAL 4th-round pick in 2025	To Seattle Kraken Mason Marchment	
June 21, 2025	To Chicago Blackhawks André Burakovsky	To Seattle Kraken Joe Veleno	
June 26, 2025	To Minnesota Wild 4rd-round pick in 2025	To Seattle Kraken Frédérick Gaudreau	

=== Free agents acquired ===
Date	Player	Former team	Term	Ref
July 1, 2024	Brandon Montour	Florida Panthers	7-year	
July 1, 2024	Chandler Stephenson	Vegas Golden Knights	7-year	
July 1, 2024	Brandon Biro	Buffalo Sabres	1-year	
July 1, 2024	Nikolas Brouillard	New York Rangers	1-year	
July 1, 2024	Maxime Lajoie	Toronto Maple Leafs	1-year	
July 1, 2024	Ben Meyers	Anaheim Ducks	1-year	
July 1, 2024	Mitchell Stephens	Montreal Canadiens	2-year	
July 3, 2024	Josh Mahura	Florida Panthers	1-year	

=== Free agents lost ===
Date	Player	New team	Ref
July 1, 2024	Devin Shore	Minnesota Wild	
July 1, 2024	Connor Carrick	Edmonton Oilers	
July 1, 2024	Kole Lind	Dallas Stars	
July 1, 2024	Cameron Hughes	Dallas Stars	
July 1, 2024	Jimmy Schuldt	San Jose Sharks	
July 1, 2024	Chris Driedger	Florida Panthers	
July 2, 2024	Tomas Tatar	New Jersey Devils	
July 2, 2024	Peetro Seppala	Örebro HK (SHL)	
July 3, 2024	Andrew Poturalski	San Jose Sharks	
July 16, 2024	Mitch Reinke	Eisbären Berlin (DEL)	
October 6, 2024	Kailer Yamamoto	Utah Hockey Club	
October 23, 2024	Justin Schultz	HC Lugano (NL)	

=== Claimed via waivers ===
Player	Previous team	Date	Ref

=== Lost via waivers ===
Player	New team	Date	Ref

=== Lost via retirement ===
Date	Player	Ref

=== Other signings ===
Date	Player	Term	Ref
July 5, 2024	Eeli Tolvanen	2-year	
July 5, 2024	Berkly Catton	3-year	
July 14, 2024	Kim Saarinen	3-year	
August 20, 2024	Matty Beniers	7-year	
September 10, 2024	Adam Larsson	4-year	
October 9, 2024	Joey Daccord	5-year	
April 8, 2025	Andrei Loshko	3-year	
April 8, 2025	Nathan Villeneuve	3-year	
May 27, 2025	Tyson Jugnauth	3-year	
May 28, 2025	John Hayden	2-year	
May 30, 2025	Josh Mahura	2-year	
June 1, 2025	Kaden Hammell	3-year	
June 2, 2025	Ben Meyers	1-year	
June 20, 2025	Cale Fleury	2-year	

=== Other players lost ===
Date	Player	Term	Ref

== Draft picks ==
Below are the Seattle Krakens' selections at the 2024 NHL entry draft, which was held on June 28 to 29, 2024, at the Sphere in Las Vegas, Nevada.

Round	#	Player	Pos	Nationality	College/Junior/Club (League)
1	8	Berkly Catton	C	Canada	Spokane Chiefs (WHL)
2	40	Julius Miettinen	C	Finland	Everett Silvertips (WHL)
2	63 (Note: The New York Rangers' second-round pick went to the Seattle Kraken as the result of a trade on March 6, 2024, that sent Alexander Wennberg to New York in exchange for a conditional fourth-round pick in 2025 and this pick.)	Nathan Villeneuve	C	Canada	Sudbury Wolves (OHL)
3	73	Alexis Bernier	D	Canada	Baie-Comeau Drakkar (QMJHL)
3	88 (Note: The Toronto Maple Leafs' third-round pick went to the Kraken as the result of a trade on March 20, 2022, that sent Mark Giordano and Colin Blackwell to Toronto in exchange for a second-round pick in both 2022 and 2023 and this pick.)	Kim Saarinen	G	Finland	HPK (J20 Nationell)
4	105	Ollie Josephson	C	Canada	Red Deer Rebels (WHL)
5	141 (Note: The Florida Panthers' fifth-round pick went to the Kraken as the result of a trade that sent the Kraken's sixth round and seventh round picks to Florida in exchange for this pick.)	Clarke Caswell	LW	Canada	Swift Current Broncos (WHL)
7	202 (Note: The Calgary Flames' seventh-round pick went to the Kraken as the result of a trade on March 16, 2022, that sent Calle Jarnkrok to Calgary in exchange for Florida's second-round pick in 2022, a third-round pick in 2023 and this pick.)	Jakub Fibigr	D	Czech Republic	Mississauga Steelheads (OHL)
