= 2024–25 Calgary Flames season =

National Hockey League season

2024–25 Calgary Flames
- Division: 4th Pacific
- Conference: 9th Western
- 2024–25 record: 41–27–14
- Home record: 23–12–6
- Road record: 18–15–8
- Goals for: 225
- Goals against: 238

Team information
- General manager: Craig Conroy
- Coach: Ryan Huska
- Captain: Mikael Backlund
- Alternate captains: Rasmus Andersson; Blake Coleman; Jonathan Huberdeau; Nazem Kadri; MacKenzie Weegar
- Arena: Scotiabank Saddledome
- Average attendance: 17,655
- Minor league affiliates: Calgary Wranglers (AHL); Rapid City Rush (ECHL)

Team leaders
- Goals: Nazem Kadri (35)
- Assists: MacKenzie Weegar (38)
- Points: Nazem Kadri (67)
- Penalty minutes: Brayden Pachal (86)
- Plus/minus: MacKenzie Weegar (+15)
- Wins: Dustin Wolf (27)
- Goals against average: Dustin Wolf (2.64)

The 2024–25 Calgary Flames season was their 45th season in Calgary, and their 53rd season for the National Hockey League (NHL) franchise that was established on June 6, 1972. Their season was overshadowed by a tragedy, where their former star player Johnny Gaudreau and his brother Matthew were killed when suspected drunk driver Sean Higgins struck their bicycles from behind with his vehicle. The team dedicated the season to Johnny's memory.

Despite earning 96 points, they failed to qualify for the playoffs for the third consecutive season, tying the 2014–15 Boston Bruins, 2017–18 Florida Panthers, and 2018–19 Montreal Canadiens for the most points by a team that missed the playoffs.

== Regular season ==
=== October–December ===
Heading into the season, the Flames were expected by many to finish near the bottom of the league standings. They had traded many of their key players at the 2024 trade deadline. Rookie goaltender Dustin Wolf was expected to start many of their games. However, the Flames caught the league by surprise when they opened the season 5-0-1 in their first six games. It started when on October 9, they won their opening game in Vancouver 6-5 on Connor Zary's overtime goal after coming back from down 4-1 late in the second. They started their home opener against the Philadelphia Flyers on October 12 by holding a ceremony for the late Johnny Gaudreau. They won the game 6-3, in which Jonathan Huberdeau's two goals and two assists were the difference. This was a bright spot to start his 2024-25 campaign after two disappointing seasons in Calgary. They won their next two games vs the Edmonton Oilers and Chicago Blackhawks 3-0 and 3-1 respectively, to start the season 4-0 and match the best start in franchise history, both achieved in 2009-10 and 1993-94. They endured their first loss on October 19, when they lost 2-1 in overtime at the Seattle Kraken. Their point streak would be snapped on October 24, when they lost 4-2 to the Carolina Hurricanes. They would finish the month 5-4-1 and on a four-game losing streak.

The Flames would start November with a 3-0 victory over the New Jersey Devils in which Blake Coleman scored two goals and Daniel Vladar recorded his third career shutout. On November 11, it was announced that free-agent singing Anthony Mantha would undergo season-ending ACL surgery from an injury sustained against the Montreal Canadiens on November 5. The Flames would go 5-1-2 in their next eight games, starting with an overtime loss and a shootout loss, followed by five wins in six games, one of which was a 2-0 win over the Nashville Predators on November 15. Dustin Wolf stopped 29 shots for his first career shutout, he also improved to 6-2-1 on the season. They then lost the next two games to the Ottawa Senators and Detroit Red Wings, 4-3 in regulation and 2-1 in overtime respectively. On November 29, in an emotional game against the Columbus Blue Jackets, the other team Johnny Gaudreau played for. The Flames lost 5-2. Shootout catalyst Justin Kirkland exited the game with a lower-body injury and would later require season-ending knee surgery. Their last game in November was the following night, a 6-2 beatdown at the hands of the Pittsburgh Penguins. They finished with a 7-5-3 record in November and a 12-9-4 record overall, and like in October, a four-game losing streak.

The Flames started off December by playing the Blue Jackets once again, this time in the Scotiabank Saddledome. The two teams would hold a ceremony and a ceremonial puck drop. The Flames would claim victory in this meeting 3-0. They fell to the Dallas Stars 6-2 two games later, surrendering four goals in the third. By this point, the Flames had gone a franchise record 25 games without scoring more than three goals in regulation. Additionally, they had a grumpy 3-7-4 record on the road. The Flames would again surrender four goals in the third period four nights later on December 12 in an abysmal 8-3 loss to the Tampa Bay Lightning, their first regulation loss on home ice in over a month. They also surrendered six points to Nikita Kucherov, and a hat-trick to Jake Guentzel. They would bounce back two nights later with a 3-0 victory over Tampa Bay's rival Florida Panthers. Dustin Wolf made 32 stops in the process. The Flames would lose their next two games in overtime to the Bruins and Senators respectively. On December 21, their last game before he Christmas break, they won 6-4 over the Chicago Blackhawks after nearly blowing a 5-1 lead in the third period. The team mustered up 16-11-7 record heading into the break, and were 1 point behind the Dallas Stars for the second wild-card spot in the Western Conference. The Flames returned to play on December 28 by playing the San Jose Sharks at the SAP Center. They prevailed in a 3-1 decision, where Jonathan Huberdeau recorded two goals. They were then blanked the following night 3-0 by the Vegas Golden Knights. The Flames' final game of 2024 came on New Year's Eve, where they outlasted the Vancouver Canucks 3-1.

=== January–April ===
The Flames begun 2025 occupying the second wild-card spot and eighth seed in the West, having far exceeded expectations that were set for them. Their first game of the year was played on January 2, where they were defeated by the then-Utah Hockey Club (now Utah Mammoth) 5-3 at home. They lost again two days later, this time at the hands of the Nashville Predators 4-1. Ryan O'Reilly netted a hat-trick in that game. Three days later, they visited the Anaheim Ducks, where Huberdeau would score the overtime winner to claim victory over the Anaheim Ducks 3-2. The Flames were supposed to play in Los Angeles the following night, but the game was postponed that morning due to wildfires in the area. The game was eventually rescheduled for April 17, the final day of the regular season. On January 11, they played that same Kings team at the Saddledome, prevailing 2-1, with Wolf making 31 stops. On January 13, against the Chicago Blackhawks, rookie Rory Kerins picked up his first NHL point on his first shift when he assisted on a Jakob Pelletier goal. Kerins had two assists overall in a 5-2 win. The Flames would then lose consecultive games at St. Louis, with the scores being 2-1 and 4-1 respectively. On January 18, Dustin Wolf set a season-high, stopping 38 shots in a 3-1 victory in over the Winnipeg Jets. They would win three out of their next five games to close out the month. On the night of January 30, the Flames acquired Morgan Frost, Joel Farabee, a 2025 second-round pick, and a 2028 seventh-round pick from the Philadelphia Flyers in exchange for Jakob Pelletier and Andrei Kuzmenko.

Just like January, the Flames started February holding the second wild-card position. They split their first two games of the month. First losing 3-1 to the Detroit Red Wings, then prevailing 3-2 over the Seattle Kraken. In the latter, Morgan Frost scored his first goal with the Flames since being acquired. The Flames would then lose their next three games before the 4 Nations Face-Off. Defenseman Rasmus Andersson was the lone Flames player to go play at the tournament, representing Team Sweden. The Flames returned to play on February 23, beating the San Jose Sharks 3-2. They defeated the Washington Capitals 3-1 two days later to kickstart their six-game roadtrip. They would get blanked by the Lightning 3-0 on February 27, with Andrei Vasilevskiy making 28 saves in the process.

Entering March, the Flames were one point behind the Vancouver Canucks for the second wild-card spot, with one game in hand. They started off the month getting shutout 3-0 by the Florida Panthers, the second game in a row where they lost by that margin. They then played the Carolina Hurricanes in the latter half of a back-to-back. They lost 2-1 in overtime. The offense completely fizzled, only taking 16 shots the entire game. Two days later, they snapped their three-game losing skid by beating the Philadelphia Flyers 6-3 on the back of four first period goals, two of them coming from Connor Zary. They lost to the Dallas Stars 3-2 in overtime to conclude the roadtrip. They were leading that game 2-0 before Wyatt Johnston and Jason Robertson scored to tie it up, vefore Robertson scored again in the extra frame. Back at home on March 8, the Flames won a 1-0 goalie duel, with the lone goal coming from Joel Farabee late in the second period, and Wolf making 26 saves. With the shutout, Wolf tied a Flames rookie record. This also tied him for the rookie lead with Leevi Merilainen of the Ottawa Senators. Four days later, they lost 4-3 in a shootout to the Vancouver Canucks, with Huberdeau scoring two. The Flames would lose their next two games, 4-2 to the Colorado Avalanche and 6-2 to the Toronto Maple Leafs, respectively. They would then win all three games in their tri-state area roadtrip. Firstly, they prevailed 2-1 over the New York Rangers, with every goal coming in the first period. Backup goaltender Dan Vladar only had to make 12 saves. Two nights later, they came back to beat the New Jersey Devils 5-3, scoring four unanswered in the third. Lastly, they beat the New York Islanders 4-3. Huberdeau scoring the tying goal late, then Nazem Kadri notched the overtime winner. Back at home on March 27, the Flames got their fourth straight win, topping the Seattle Kraken 4-3 in overtime, with Nazem Kadri scoring his second overtime winner in as many games. The Flames would lose 5-2 to the Dallas Stars, with two disallowed goals. Additoinally, Nazem Kadri would have his second straight two-goal game, and would record seven goals in five games. This is the game that he would reach 30 goals. ON March 29, the Flames would fall 3-2 in overtime to the Edmonton Oilers. Leon Draisaitl would score two goals, those being the tying and overtime winning goals. In the last game of the month, Ryan Lomberg and Adam Klapka would score 32 seconds apart midway through the third, leading the way in a 3-2 shootout win over the Colorado Avalanche. This was their fifth win in seven games.

With nine games to go in their season, they sat five points behind the St. Louis Blues for the second wild-card spot, and six points behind the Minnesota Wild for the first, with two games in hand on each. In their first game of April. they lost 3-1 to the Utah Hockey Club at Delta Center. On April 3, they defeated the Anaheim Ducks 4-1, with Blake Coleman scoring two goals. They then lost 3-2 in overtime to the Vegas Golden Knights on April 5. Two days later, the Flames scored three third period goals to defeat the San Jose Sharks 3-2. On April 9, they would lose 4-3 to the Anaheim Ducks in a thriller. The Flames lead 3-1 late in the third, but Frank Vatrano and Cutter Gauthier both scored at 16:03 and 16:11 respectively to pull even, before Gauthier added another one at 1:11 of overtime to seal the game for the Ducks. Two days later, they beat the Minnesota Wild, who they were chasing, 4-2. This pulled the Flames to within three points of both the Wild and the Blues. The Flames then won 5-2 against the San Jose Sharks, again scoring three in the third, the second time in six days against them. Yegor Sharangovich scored two. On April 15, the Flames were eliminated from playoff contention before the third period of their game against the Vegas Golden Knights had started. This is because the Wild had picked up a point against the Ducks, being led by a Joel Eriksson Ek goal with 22.5 seconds remaining. Also, the Blues had beaten the Utah Hockey Club 6-1 in their game. Nevertheless, the Flames came back to beat the Knights 5-4 in a shootout. Dustin Wolf made 38 stops in the process. In Game 82 of their season, they went to Crypto.com Arena to play the Los Angeles Kings. This game was rescheduled from January 8. Star prospect Zayne Parekh, defenseman Hunter Brzustewicz, center Sam Morton, and left wing Aydar Suniev would all make their NHL debuts. Parekh and Morton would each score their first goals in a 5-1 victory. Nazem Kadri would net two. The Flames would finish the season on a four-game winning streak, with a 41-27-14 record. They tied the Blues in points, but missed out on the playoffs due to having fewer regulation wins (32-31). Their 96 points were tied for the most in NHL history to miss the playoffs, being grouped in with the 2014–15 Boston Bruins, 2017–18 Florida Panthers, and 2018–19 Montreal Canadiens.

== Standings ==
=== Divisional standings ===
Pacific Division
Pos	Team	GP	W	L	OTL	RW	GF	GA	GD	Pts
1	y – Vegas Golden Knights	82	50	22	10	46	275	219	+56	110
2	x – Los Angeles Kings	82	48	25	9	43	250	206	+44	105
3	x – Edmonton Oilers	82	48	29	5	36	259	236	+23	101
4	Calgary Flames	82	41	27	14	31	225	238	−13	96
5	Vancouver Canucks	82	38	30	14	28	236	253	−17	90
6	Anaheim Ducks	82	35	37	10	24	221	263	−42	80
7	Seattle Kraken	82	35	41	6	28	247	265	−18	76
8	San Jose Sharks	82	20	50	12	14	210	315	−105	52

Source: National Hockey League
Rules for classification: 1) Fewer number of games played (GP, only during regular season); 2) Greater number of regulation wins (RW); 3) Greater number of wins in regulation and overtime, excluding shootout wins (ROW); 4) Greater number of total wins, including shootouts (W); 5) Greater number of points earned in head-to-head play; if teams played an uneven number of head-to-head games, the result of the first game on the home ice of the team with the extra home game is discarded; 6) Greater goal differential (GD); 7) Greater number of goals scored (GF)
x – Clinched playoff spot; y – Clinched division

=== Conference standings ===
Western Conference Wild Card
Pos	Div	Team	GP	W	L	OTL	RW	GF	GA	GD	Pts
1	CE	x – Minnesota Wild	82	45	30	7	33	228	239	−11	97
2	CE	x – St. Louis Blues	82	44	30	8	32	254	233	+21	96
3	PA	Calgary Flames	82	41	27	14	31	225	238	−13	96
4	PA	Vancouver Canucks	82	38	30	14	28	236	253	−17	90
5	CE	Utah Hockey Club	82	38	31	13	30	241	251	−10	89
6	PA	Anaheim Ducks	82	35	37	10	24	221	263	−42	80
7	PA	Seattle Kraken	82	35	41	6	28	247	265	−18	76
8	CE	Nashville Predators	82	30	44	8	24	214	274	−60	68
9	CE	Chicago Blackhawks	82	25	46	11	20	226	296	−70	61
10	PA	San Jose Sharks	82	20	50	12	14	210	315	−105	52

Source: National Hockey League
Rules for classification: 1) Fewer number of games played (GP, only during regular season); 2) Greater number of regulation wins (RW); 3) Greater number of wins in regulation and overtime, excluding shootout wins (ROW); 4) Greater number of total wins, including shootouts (W); 5) Greater number of points earned in head-to-head play; if teams played an uneven number of head-to-head games, the result of the first game on the home ice of the team with the extra home game is discarded; 6) Greater goal differential (GD); 7) Greater number of goals scored (GF)
x – Clinched playoff spot

== Schedule and results ==
=== Young Stars tournament ===
As with previous years, the Flames took part in the annual Young Stars Classic, for its 11th edition, once again held in Penticton. The tournament took place from September 13 through 16, 2024.

2024 Young Stars tournament game log: 1–1–1
#	Date	Visitor	Score	Home	OT	Decision	Attendance	Record	Recap
1	September 13	Calgary	3–4	Winnipeg	OT	Murphy		0–0–1
2	September 14	Calgary	3–1	Edmonton		Ignatjew		1–0–1
3	September 16	Calgary	3–4	Vancouver		Murphy		1–1–1
Notes: Games played at the South Okanagan Events Centre in Penticton, British Columbia.

=== Preseason ===
The preseason schedule was published on June 20, 2024.

2024 preseason game log: 5–2–1 (Home: 3–1–0; Road: 2–1–1)
#	Date	Visitor	Score	Home	OT	Decision	Location	Attendance	Record	Recap
1	September 22	Calgary	6–1	Seattle		Wolf	Climate Pledge Arena	17,151	1–0–0
2^{A}	September 23	Edmonton	1–6	Calgary		Vladar	Scotiabank Saddledome	14,500	2–0–0
3^{A}	September 23	Calgary	6–3	Edmonton		Cooley	Rogers Place	13,000	3–0–0
4^{B}	September 25	Calgary	3–4	Vancouver	OT	Wolf	Abbotsford Centre	6,534	3–0–1
5	September 28	Vancouver	2–4	Calgary		Vladar	Scotiabank Saddledome	15,978	4–0–1
6	September 30	Seattle	3–4	Calgary	OT	Vladar	Scotiabank Saddledome	14,605	5–0–1
7	October 2	Calgary	2–5	Winnipeg		Wolf	Canada Life Centre	12,013	5–1–1
8	October 4	Winnipeg	3–2	Calgary		Vladar	Scotiabank Saddledome	16,311	5–2–1
Notes:^{A} Indicates split-squad. ^{B} Game played at Abbotsford.

=== Regular season ===
2024–25 game log

October: 5–4–1 (Home: 3–2–0; Road: 2–2–1)
#	Date	Visitor	Score	Home	OT	Decision	Venue	Attendance	Record	Points	Recap
1	October 9	Calgary	6–5	Vancouver	OT	Vladar	Rogers Arena	18,850	1–0–0	2
2	October 12	Philadelphia	3–6	Calgary		Wolf	Scotiabank Saddledome	19,289	2–0–0	4
3	October 13	Calgary	4–1	Edmonton		Vladar	Rogers Place	18,347	3–0–0	6
4	October 15	Chicago	1–3	Calgary		Wolf	Scotiabank Saddledome	16,242	4–0–0	8
5	October 19	Calgary	1–2	Seattle	OT	Vladar	Climate Pledge Arena	17,151	4–0–1	9
6	October 22	Pittsburgh	3–4	Calgary	SO	Wolf	Scotiabank Saddledome	17,025	5–0–1	11
7	October 24	Carolina	4–2	Calgary		Vladar	Scotiabank Saddledome	16,404	5–1–1	11
8	October 26	Winnipeg	5–3	Calgary		Wolf	Scotiabank Saddledome	16,886	5–2–1	11
9	October 28	Calgary	0–5	Vegas		Vladar	T-Mobile Arena	17,599	5–3–1	11
10	October 30	Calgary	1–5	Utah		Wolf	Delta Center	11,131	5–4–1	11

November: 7–5–3 (Home: 6–1–0; Road: 1–4–3)
#	Date	Visitor	Score	Home	OT	Decision	Venue	Attendance	Record	Points	Recap
11	November 1	New Jersey	0–3	Calgary		Vladar	Scotiabank Saddledome	16,275	6–4–1	13
12	November 3	Edmonton	4–2	Calgary		Vladar	Scotiabank Saddledome	19,289	6–5–1	13
13	November 5	Calgary	3–2	Montreal	OT	Wolf	Bell Centre	21,105	7–5–1	15
14	November 7	Calgary	3–4	Boston	OT	Wolf	TD Garden	17,850	7–5–2	16
15	November 9	Calgary	2–3	Buffalo	SO	Vladar	KeyBank Center	16,442	7–5–3	17
16	November 11	Los Angeles	1–3	Calgary		Wolf	Scotiabank Saddledome	16,920	8–5–3	19
17	November 12	Calgary	1–3	Vancouver		Vladar	Rogers Arena	18,781	8–6–3	19
18	November 15	Nashville	0–2	Calgary		Wolf	Scotiabank Saddledome	17,900	9–6–3	21
19	November 19	NY Islanders	1–2	Calgary	SO	Wolf	Scotiabank Saddledome	16,565	10–6–3	23
20	November 21	NY Rangers	2–3	Calgary		Wolf	Scotiabank Saddledome	17,033	11–6–3	25
21	November 23	Minnesota	3–4	Calgary	SO	Vladar	Scotiabank Saddledome	17,116	12–6–3	27
22	November 25	Calgary	3–4	Ottawa		Wolf	Canadian Tire Centre	17,196	12–7–3	27
23	November 27	Calgary	1–2	Detroit	OT	Vladar	Little Caesars Arena	19,515	12–7–4	28
24	November 29	Calgary	2–5	Columbus		Wolf	Nationwide Arena	17,035	12–8–4	28
25	November 30	Calgary	2–6	Pittsburgh		Vladar	PPG Paints Arena	16,060	12–9–4	28

December: 6–3–3 (Home: 3–1–3; Road: 2–2–0)
#	Date	Visitor	Score	Home	OT	Decision	Venue	Attendance	Record	Points	Recap
26	December 3	Columbus	0–3	Calgary		Vladar	Scotiabank Saddledome	17,386	13–9–4	30
27	December 5	St. Louis	4–3	Calgary	OT	Vladar	Scotiabank Saddledome	17,060	13–9–5	31
28	December 8	Calgary	2–6	Dallas		Wolf	American Airlines Center	18,532	13–10–5	31
29	December 10	Calgary	4–3	Nashville		Vladar	Bridgestone Arena	17,159	14–10–5	33
30	December 12	Tampa Bay	8–3	Calgary		Vladar	Scotiabank Saddledome	17,028	14–11–5	33
31	December 14	Florida	0–3	Calgary		Wolf	Scotiabank Saddledome	18,018	15–11–5	35
32	December 17	Boston	4–3	Calgary	OT	Wolf	Scotiabank Saddledome	17,536	15–11–6	36
33	December 19	Ottawa	3–2	Calgary	OT	Vladar	Scotiabank Saddledome	17,271	15–11–7	37
34	December 21	Chicago	4–6	Calgary		Wolf	Scotiabank Saddledome	18,760	16–11–7	39
35	December 28	Calgary	3–1	San Jose		Wolf	SAP Center	17,435	17–11–7	41
36	December 29	Calgary	0–3	Vegas		Vladar	T-Mobile Arena	18,269	17–12–7	41
37	December 31	Vancouver	1–3	Calgary		Wolf	Scotiabank Saddledome	19,289	18–12–7	43

January: 7–6–0 (Home: 3–3–0; Road: 4–3–0)
#	Date	Visitor	Score	Home	OT	Decision	Venue	Attendance	Record	Points	Recap
38	January 2	Utah	5–3	Calgary		Vladar	Scotiabank Saddledome	17,160	18–13–7	43
39	January 4	Nashville	4–1	Calgary		Wolf	Scotiabank Saddledome	17,893	18–14–7	43
40	January 7	Calgary	3–2	Anaheim	OT	Wolf	Honda Center	17,396	19–14–7	45
—	January 8	Calgary		Los Angeles	Game postponed due to the January 2025 Southern California wildfires. Makeup date: April 17
41	January 11	Los Angeles	1–2	Calgary		Wolf	Scotiabank Saddledome	18,446	20–14–7	47
42	January 13	Calgary	5–2	Chicago		Wolf	United Center	15,966	21–14–7	49
43	January 14	Calgary	1–2	St. Louis		Vladar	Enterprise Center	16,992	21–15–7	49
44	January 16	Calgary	1–4	St. Louis		Wolf	Enterprise Center	17,456	21–16–7	49
45	January 18	Calgary	3–1	Winnipeg		Wolf	Canada Life Centre	15,225	22–16–7	51
46	January 23	Buffalo	2–5	Calgary		Wolf	Scotiabank Saddledome	17,585	23–16–7	53
47	January 25	Calgary	5–4	Minnesota		Wolf	Xcel Energy Center	19,212	24–16–7	55
48	January 26	Calgary	2–5	Winnipeg		Vladar	Canada Life Centre	14,491	24–17–7	55
49	January 28	Washington	3–1	Calgary		Wolf	Scotiabank Saddledome	17,455	24–18–7	55
50	January 30	Anaheim	1–4	Calgary		Wolf	Scotiabank Saddledome	17,123	25–18–7	57

February: 3–4–1 (Home: 1–3–1; Road: 2–1–0)
#	Date	Visitor	Score	Home	OT	Decision	Venue	Attendance	Record	Points	Recap
51	February 1	Detroit	3–1	Calgary		Wolf	Scotiabank Saddledome	17,707	25–19–7	57
52	February 2	Calgary	3–2	Seattle		Vladar	Climate Pledge Arena	17,151	26–19–7	59
53	February 4	Toronto	6–3	Calgary		Wolf	Scotiabank Saddledome	18,769	26–20–7	59
54	February 6	Colorado	4–2	Calgary		Wolf	Scotiabank Saddledome	17,345	26–21–7	59
55	February 8	Seattle	3–2	Calgary	OT	Wolf	Scotiabank Saddledome	17,795	26–21–8	60
56	February 23	San Jose	2–3	Calgary		Wolf	Scotiabank Saddledome	17,686	27–21–8	62
57	February 25	Calgary	3–1	Washington		Vladar	Capital One Arena	18,573	28–21–8	64
58	February 27	Calgary	0–3	Tampa Bay		Wolf	Amalie Arena	19,092	28–22–8	64

March: 7–4–3 (Home: 2–2–1; Road: 5–2–3)
#	Date	Visitor	Score	Home	OT	Decision	Venue	Attendance	Record	Points	Recap
59	March 1	Calgary	0–3	Florida		Vladar	Amerant Bank Arena	19,416	28–23–8	64
60	March 2	Calgary	1–2	Carolina	OT	Wolf	Lenovo Center	18,700	28–23–9	65
61	March 4	Calgary	6–3	Philadelphia		Wolf	Wells Fargo Center	18,510	29–23–9	67
62	March 6	Calgary	2–3	Dallas	OT	Vladar	American Airlines Center	18,532	29–23–10	68
63	March 8	Montreal	0–1	Calgary		Wolf	Scotiabank Saddledome	19,243	30–23–10	70
64	March 12	Vancouver	4–3	Calgary	SO	Wolf	Scotiabank Saddledome	18,805	30–23–11	71
65	March 14	Colorado	4–2	Calgary		Wolf	Scotiabank Saddledome	18,717	30–24–11	71
66	March 17	Calgary	2–6	Toronto		Wolf	Scotiabank Arena	19,033	30–25–11	71
67	March 18	Calgary	2–1	NY Rangers		Vladar	Madison Square Garden	17,591	31–25–11	73
68	March 20	Calgary	5–3	New Jersey		Wolf	Prudential Center	16,027	32–25–11	75
69	March 22	Calgary	4–3	NY Islanders	OT	Vladar	UBS Arena	17,255	33–25–11	77
70	March 25	Seattle	3–4	Calgary	OT	Wolf	Scotiabank Saddledome	14,955	34–25–11	79
71	March 27	Dallas	5–2	Calgary		Wolf	Scotiabank Saddledome	17,737	34–26–11	79
72	March 29	Calgary	2–3	Edmonton	OT	Wolf	Rogers Place	18,347	34–26–12	80
73	March 31	Calgary	3–2	Colorado	SO	Vladar	Ball Arena	18,075	35–26–12	82

April: 6–1–2 (Home: 4–0–1; Road: 2–1–1)
#	Date	Visitor	Score	Home	OT	Decision	Venue	Attendance	Record	Points	Recap
74	April 1	Calgary	1–3	Utah		Wolf	Delta Center	11,131	35–27–12	82
75	April 3	Anaheim	1–4	Calgary		Wolf	Scotiabank Saddledome	17,174	36–27–12	84
76	April 5	Vegas	3–2	Calgary	OT	Wolf	Scotiabank Saddledome	18,104	36–27–13	85
77	April 7	Calgary	3–2	San Jose		Wolf	SAP Center	12,654	37–27–13	87
78	April 9	Calgary	3–4	Anaheim	OT	Wolf	Honda Center	15,134	37–27–14	88
79	April 11	Minnesota	2–4	Calgary		Wolf	Scotiabank Saddledome	18,566	38–27–14	90
80	April 13	San Jose	2–5	Calgary		Wolf	Scotiabank Saddledome	17,232	39–27–14	92
81	April 15	Vegas	4–5	Calgary	SO	Wolf	Scotiabank Saddledome	19,055	40–27–14	94
82	April 17	Calgary	5–1	Los Angeles		Vladar	Crypto.com Arena	18,145	41–27–14	96

Legend: Win (2 points) Loss (0 points) Overtime/shootout loss (1 point)

== Player statistics ==
As of April 17, 2025

=== Skaters ===
Regular season
Player	GP	G	A	Pts	+/−	PIM
Nazem Kadri	82	35	32	67	–17	72
Jonathan Huberdeau	81	28	34	62	−13	34
Matthew Coronato	77	24	23	47	+6	25
MacKenzie Weegar	81	8	39	47	+18	33
Blake Coleman	82	15	24	39	−2	36
Yegor Sharangovich	73	17	15	32	–9	8
Mikael Backlund	76	15	17	32	+4	32
Rasmus Andersson	81	11	20	31	–38	60
Connor Zary	54	13	14	27	–7	14
Martin Pospisil	81	4	21	25	+3	84
Kevin Bahl	73	3	17	20	–6	35
Andrei Kuzmenko^{‡}	37	4	11	15	–7	12
Ryan Lomberg	80	3	10	13	–5	57
Morgan Frost^{†}	32	3	9	12	–6	6
Brayden Pachal	76	3	9	12	+5	88
Jakob Pelletier^{‡}	24	4	7	11	+10	6
Adam Klapka	31	6	4	10	–3	29
Kevin Rooney	70	5	5	10	–6	14
Joel Hanley	53	2	7	9	+12	21
Daniil Miromanov	44	2	7	9	+2	12
Justin Kirkland	21	2	6	8	+6	11
Anthony Mantha	13	4	3	7	+6	11
Jake Bean	64	2	5	7	0	8
Joel Farabee^{†}	31	3	3	6	–5	8
Rory Kerins	5	0	4	4	+3	0
Tyson Barrie	13	1	2	3	–7	4
Dryden Hunt	5	0	3	3	–1	0
Clark Bishop	6	1	0	1	–2	0
Zayne Parekh	1	1	0	1	+3	2
Sam Morton	1	1	0	1	+1	0
Ilya Solovyov	5	0	1	1	–3	2
Walker Duehr^{‡}	16	0	1	1	–6	0
Hunter Brzustewicz	1	0	0	0	+2	2
Samuel Honzek	5	0	0	0	–1	2
Aydar Suniev	1	0	0	0	+2	0

=== Goaltenders ===
Regular season
Player	GP	GS	TOI	W	L	OT	GA	GAA	SA	SV%	SO	G	A	PIM
Dustin Wolf	53	53	3,182:22	29	16	8	140	2.64	1,549	.910	3	0	3	2
Daniel Vladar	30	29	1,781:02	12	11	6	83	2.80	810	.898	2	0	1	2

^{†}Denotes player spent time with another team before joining the Flames. Stats reflect time with the Flames only.
^{‡}Denotes player was traded mid-season. Stats reflect time with the Flames only.
Bold/italics denotes franchise record.

== Transactions ==
The Flames have been involved in the following transactions during the 2024–25 season.

=== Key ===
† Contract is entry-level.
‡ Contract initially takes effect in the 2025–26 season.

=== Trades ===
Date	Details		Ref
June 29, 2024	To Philadelphia Flyers NJD 4th-round pick in 2024 (#107 overall)	To Calgary Flames LAK 5th-round pick in 2024 (#150 overall); STL 6th-round pick in 2024 (#177 overall)	
January 30, 2025	To Philadelphia Flyers Andrei Kuzmenko; Jakob Pelletier; 2nd-round pick in 2025; 7th-round pick in 2028	To Calgary Flames Joel Farabee; Morgan Frost	

=== Players acquired ===
Date	Player	Former team	Term	Via	Ref
July 1, 2024	Jake Bean	Columbus Blue Jackets	2-year	Free agency	
July 1, 2024	Devin Cooley	San Jose Sharks	2-year	Free agency	
July 1, 2024	Martin Frk	SC Rapperswil-Jona Lakers (NL)	1-year	Free agency	
July 1, 2024	Ryan Lomberg	Florida Panthers	2-year	Free agency	
July 1, 2024	Anthony Mantha	Vegas Golden Knights	1-year	Free agency	
July 2, 2024	Jonathan Aspirot	Calgary Wranglers (AHL)	1-year	Free agency	
July 3, 2024	Justin Kirkland	Utah Hockey Club	1-year	Free agency	
September 10, 2024	Jarred Tinordi	Chicago Blackhawks	1-year	Free agency	
October 3, 2024	Tyson Barrie	Nashville Predators	1-year	Free agency	
April 14, 2025	Carter King	University of Denver (NCHC)	1-year†‡	Free agency	

=== Players lost ===
Date	Player	New team	Term	Via	Ref
July 1, 2024	Dennis Gilbert	Buffalo Sabres	1-year	Free agency	
July 1, 2024	A.J. Greer	Florida Panthers	2-year	Free agency	
July 1, 2024	Ben Jones	Minnesota Wild	2-year	Free agency	
July 1, 2024	Jordan Oesterle	Boston Bruins	2-year	Free agency	
July 2, 2024	Colton Poolman	Buffalo Sabres	1-year	Free agency	
August 5, 2024	Oliver Kylington	Colorado Avalanche	1-year	Free agency	
September 5, 2024	Oscar Dansk	Anaheim Ducks	1-year	Free agency	
January 22, 2025	Walker Duehr	San Jose Sharks		Waivers	

=== Signings ===
Date	Player	Term	Ref
July 5, 2024	Zayne Parekh	3-year†	
July 5, 2024	Matvei Gridin	3-year†	
April 14, 2025	Arsenii Sergeev	2-year†‡	

== Draft picks ==
Below are the Calgary Flames selections at the 2024 NHL entry draft, which was held on June 28 and 29, 2024, at Sphere in Paradise, Nevada.

Round	#	Player	Pos	Nationality	College/Junior/Club team (League)
1	9	Zayne Parekh	D	Canada	Saginaw Spirit (OHL)
1	28 (Note: The Vancouver Canucks' first-round pick went to the Calgary Flames as the result of a trade on January 31, 2024, that sent Elias Lindholm to Vancouver in exchange for Andrei Kuzmenko, Hunter Brzustewicz, Joni Jurmo, a conditional fourth-round pick in 2024 and this pick.)	Matvei Gridin	RW	Russia	Muskegon Lumberjacks (USHL)
2	41	Andrew Basha	LW	Canada	Medicine Hat Tigers (WHL)
2	62 (Note: The Dallas Stars' second-round pick went to the Flames as the result of a trade on February 28, 2024, that sent Christopher Tanev to Dallas in exchange for Artem Grushnikov, a conditional third-round pick in 2026 and this pick.)	Jacob Battaglia	RW	Canada	Kingston Frontenacs (OHL)
3	74	Henry Mews	D	Canada	Ottawa 67's (OHL)
3	84 (Note: The Vegas Golden Knights' third-round pick went to the Flames as the result of a trade on March 6, 2024, that sent Mikhail Vorobyev to Vegas in exchange for Daniil Miromanov, a conditional first-round pick in 2025 and this pick (being conditional at the time of the trade). The condition – Calgary would receive a third-round pick in 2024 if the Golden Knights do not advance to the 2024 Western Conference second round – was converted when Vegas was eliminated in the first round of the 2024 Stanley Cup playoffs on May 5, 2024.)	Kirill Zarubin	G	Russia	HC AKM (MHL)
4	106	Trevor Hoskin	C	Canada	Cobourg Cougars (OJHL)
5	150 (Note: The Los Angeles Kings' fifth-round pick went to the Flames as the result of a trade on June 29, 2024, that sent New Jersey's fourth-round pick in 2024 (107th overall) to Philadelphia in exchange for St. Louis' sixth-round pick in 2024 (177th overall) and this pick.)	Luke Misa	C	Canada	Mississauga Steelheads (OHL)
6	170	Hunter Laing	C	Canada	Prince George Cougars (WHL)
6	177 (Note: The St. Louis Blues' sixth-round pick went to the Flames as the result of a trade on June 29, 2024, that sent New Jersey's fourth-round pick in 2024 (107th overall) to Philadelphia in exchange for Los Angeles' fifth-round pick in 2024 (150th overall) and this pick.)	Eric Jamieson	D	Canada	Everett Silvertips (WHL)
