= Nikita Tolopilo =

Belarusian ice hockey player (born 2000)

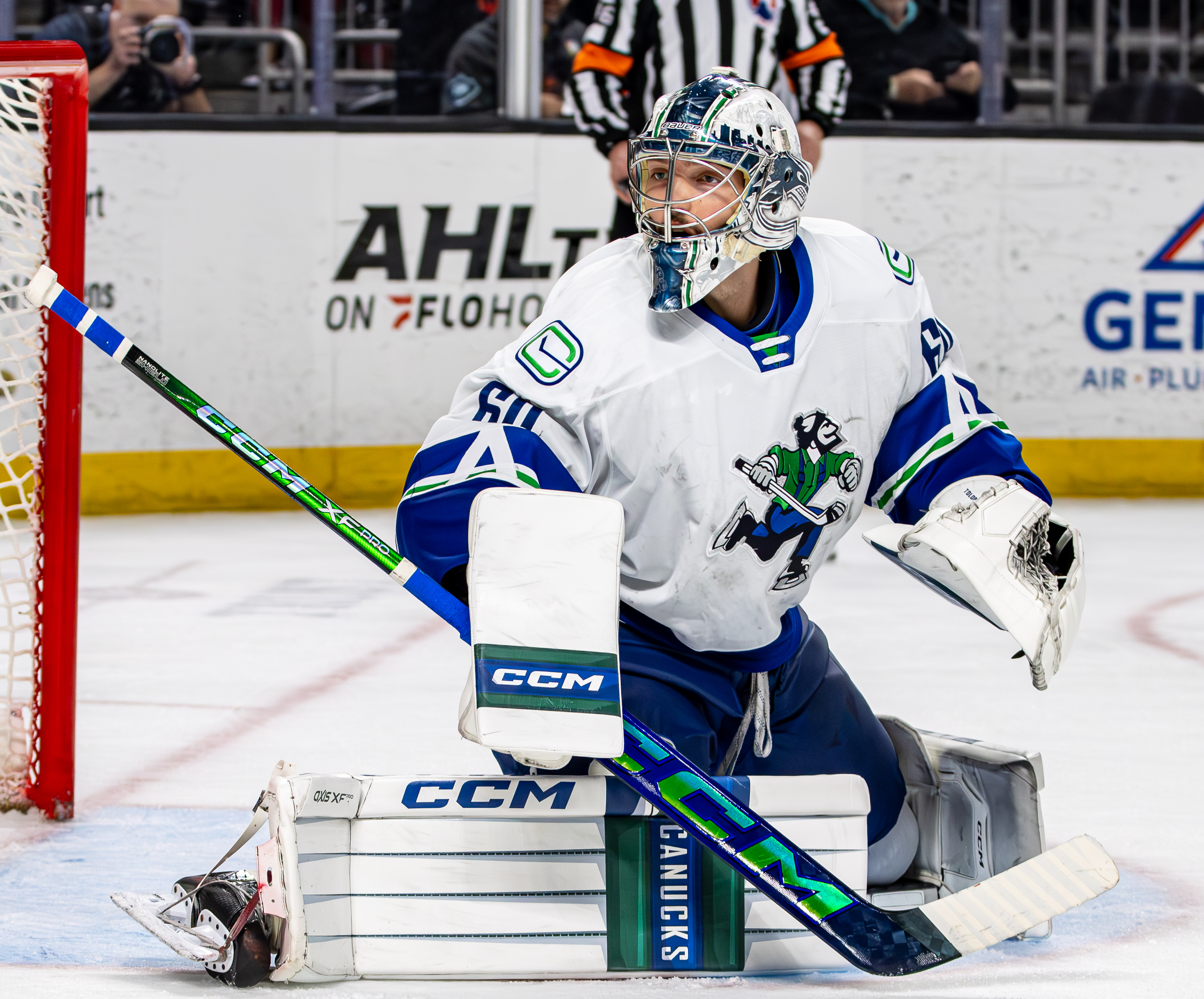
- Tolopilo with the Abbotsford Canucks in 2025.
- Born: 6 April 2000 (age 26) Minsk, Belarus
- Height: 6 ft 6 in (198 cm)
- Weight: 229 lb (104 kg; 16 st 5 lb)
- Position: Goaltender
- Catches: Left
- NHL team (P) Cur. team Former teams: Vancouver Canucks; Abbotsford Canucks (AHL); HC Dinamo Minsk
- NHL draft: Undrafted
- Playing career: 2020–present

Nikita Tolopilo (Belarusian: Мікіта Талапіла, Russian: Никита Толопило, born 6 April 2000) is a Belarusian professional ice hockey goaltender for the Abbotsford Canucks of the American Hockey League while under contract to the Vancouver Canucks of the National Hockey League (NHL). Tolopilo made his NHL debut on 14 April 2025, against the San Jose Sharks.

== Personal life ==
Tolopilo was born on 6 April 2000, in Minsk, Belarus. His younger brother Maxim also plays ice hockey.

== Playing career ==
As a free agent, Tolopilo signed a two-year, entry-level contract with the Vancouver Canucks of the National Hockey League (NHL) on 15 May 2023. After attending the training camp of Vancouver's American Hockey League (AHL) affiliate, the Abbotsford Canucks, Tolopilo was named to their 2023–24 season opening night roster. He stopped 41 shots in his league debut to earn his first AHL win on 14 October 2023 against the Laval Rocket. Tolopilo began the season sharing the starting goaltending position with Artūrs Šilovs, but took over as the team's full-time starter once Šilovs was recalled to the NHL. He maintained a 5–3–0 record through the first two months of the season, along with a .906% save percentage. Tolopilo was recalled to the NHL on 23 April 2024 during the 2024 Stanley Cup playoffs, to serve as Vancouver's emergency backup after Thatcher Demko suffered an injury in Game 1 of their first-round series versus the Nashville Predators. Following an injury to Casey DeSmith in Game 3, Tolopilo drew into the lineup and dressed as Silovs' backup in Game 4. Following the game, DeSmith returned as Silovs' backup for the remainder of Vancouver's playoff run.

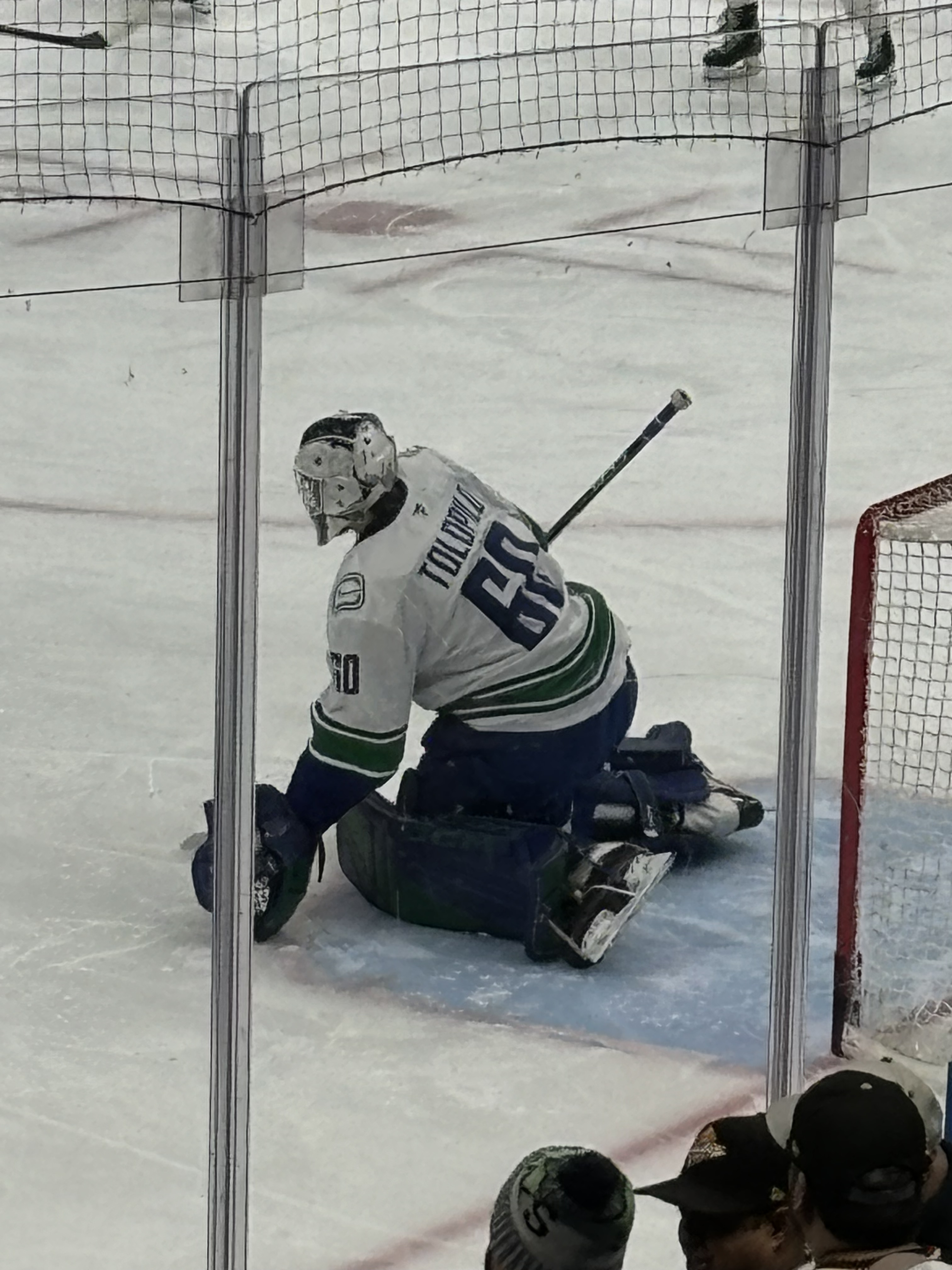
Tolopilo with Vancouver in 2026

Tolopilo was named the Abbotsford Canucks opening night roster after attending their 2024–25 training camp. He started the season with two wins through his first two starts and a .925% save percentage. He earned his first career AHL shutout on 23 November against the Henderson Silver Knights. He then became the first goaltender in franchise history to earn back-to-back shutouts following two weekend games against the Manitoba Moose in mid-December. By January, Tolopilo had a 2.67 goals-against average and .915% save percentage through 14 games. He earned his first recall of the 2024–25 season on 8 March as an emergency backup for Kevin Lankinen but was returned to the AHL the following day. Shortly after returning to Abbotsford, Tolopilo earned his fourth career shutout on 16 March against the Calgary Wranglers. By mid-April, Tolopilo had maintained a winning 18–14–2 record and a 2.68 goals against average. He was called up to the NHL on 12 April 2025 under emergency conditions and made his NHL debut on 14 April 2025. Tolopilo made 15 saves in his debut to lead the Canucks to a 2–1 win over the San Jose Sharks. Following Abbotsford's 2025 Calder Cup win, the Vancouver Canucks extended a qualifying offer to Tolopilo to retain his negotiation rights and signed him to a two-year extension on 8 July 2025.

== Career statistics ==
=== Regular season and playoffs ===
			Regular season									Playoffs
Season	Team	League	GP	W	L	OTL	MIN	GA	SO	GAA	SV%	GP	W	L	MIN	GA	SO	GAA	SV%
2019–20	Minsk Dynamo	KHL	6	2	2	0	296	18	0	3.64	.868	—	—	—	—	—	—	—	—
2020–21	Minsk Dynamo	KHL	3	0	3	0	177	8	0	2.71	.897	—	—	—	—	—	—	—	—
2021–22	Sodertalje SK	Allsv	34	11	21	0	1,947	106	1	3.27	.898	—	—	—	—	—	—	—	—
2022–23	Sodertalje SK	Allsv	45	28	17	0	2,653	93	4	2.10	.924	6	2	4	371	15	0	2.43	.919
2023–24	Abbotsford Canucks	AHL	35	20	13	1	2,039	96	0	2.83	.905	—	—	—	—	—	—	—	—
2024–25	Abbotsford Canucks	AHL	36	20	14	2	2,052	91	4	2.66	.902	1	0	1	45	2	0	2.68	.913
2024–25	Vancouver Canucks	NHL	2	1	1	0	84	3	0	2.15	.885	—	—	—	—	—	—	—	—
2025–26	Abbotsford Canucks	AHL	19	8	8	3	1,134	58	0	3.07	.897	—	—	—	—	—	—	—	—
2025–26	Vancouver Canucks	NHL	21	6	11	2	1,146	69	0	3.61	.881	—	—	—	—	—	—	—	—
KHL totals			9	2	5	0	473	26	0	3.30	.879	—	—	—	—	—	—	—	—
NHL totals			23	7	12	2	1,229	72	0	3.51	.882	—	—	—	—	—	—	—	—

== Awards and honours ==
Award	Year	Ref
AHL
Calder Cup Champion	2025	
