= Jake DeBrusk =

Canadian ice hockey player (born 1996)

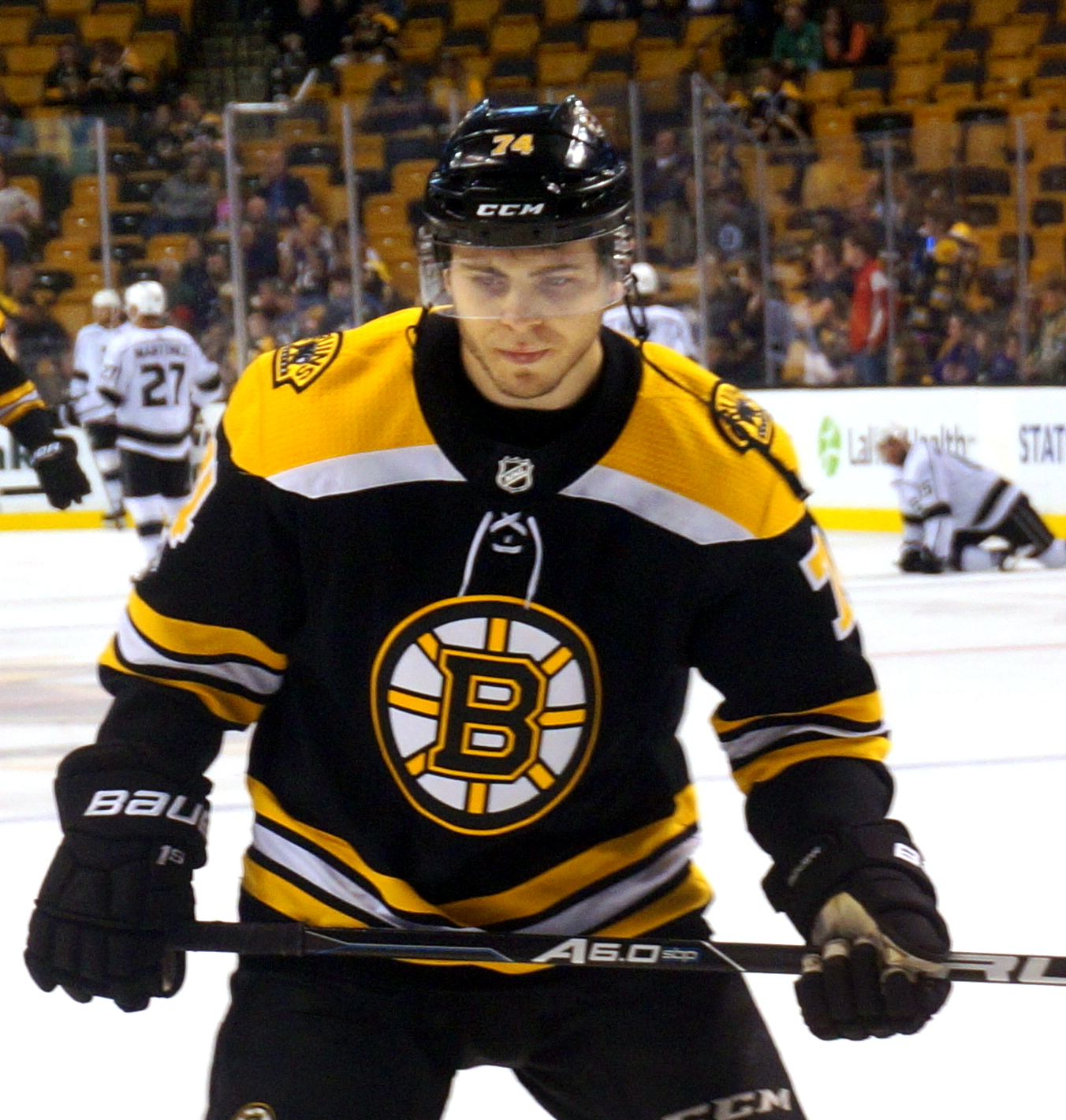
- DeBrusk with the Boston Bruins in October 2017
- Born: October 17, 1996 (age 29) Edmonton, Alberta, Canada
- Height: 6 ft 0 in (183 cm)
- Weight: 198 lb (90 kg; 14 st 2 lb)
- Position: Left wing
- Shoots: Left
- NHL team Former teams: Vancouver Canucks; Boston Bruins
- NHL draft: 14th overall, 2015; Boston Bruins
- Playing career: 2016–present

Jake DeBrusk (born October 17, 1996) is a Canadian professional ice hockey player who is a left winger for the Vancouver Canucks in the National Hockey League (NHL). He was drafted 14th overall by the Boston Bruins in the 2015 NHL entry draft. DeBrusk is the son of colour commentator and former NHL forward Louie DeBrusk.

== Playing career ==
DeBrusk was taken in the 7th round by the Swift Current Broncos at the 2011 WHL Bantam Draft. In 2015, he was selected for the CHL/NHL Top Prospects Game. DeBrusk scored 81 points in 72 games with the Swift Current Broncos during the 2014–15 WHL season. On December 26, 2015, the Broncos traded DeBrusk to the Red Deer Rebels. DeBrusk went to the 2016 Memorial Cup with the host Rebels, where they were eliminated by the Rouyn-Noranda Huskies in the semi-final match.

Ranked number 19 on the NHL Central Scouting Bureau's list of North American skaters eligible for the 2015 NHL entry draft, DeBrusk was selected in the first round, 14th overall, by the Boston Bruins.

=== Boston Bruins ===
==== Beginnings and playoff success (2016–2020) ====
DeBrusk signed a three-year entry-level contract with Boston and was assigned to the Providence Bruins for the 2016–17 season.

DeBrusk had a successful first professional season in Providence, scoring 19 goals and 30 assists in 74 games. His goalscoring ability helped lead the Bruins to the Eastern Conference Finals of the Calder Cup playoffs, where they would lose in five games to the Syracuse Crunch. DeBrusk had six goals and three assists in 17 games during the run.

DeBrusk's successful season the year prior earned him a spot on the Bruins opening night roster to start the 2017–18 season. DeBrusk made an immediate impact, scoring his first NHL goal and assist in the Bruins season opener against the Nashville Predators. His goal was the second of four goals the Bruins scored in a 4–3 home-ice win over Nashville, with his father Louie DeBrusk and family in the stands at TD Garden to witness the event. He also assisted on another Bruins goal in the game, joining fellow Bruins rookie defenseman Charlie McAvoy in garnering two points each, in each skater's first regular-season NHL game. DeBrusk accomplished the same feat just three games later against the Arizona Coyotes. DeBrusk kept improving as the season went on, showcasing his goal-scoring talent, and earning regular minutes on the Bruins second line alongside legendary Bruins center David Krejčí. DeBrusk recorded his first three point game, a goal and two assists, in a 7–2 win against the Chicago Blackhawks on December 19, 2017. He would accomplish this feat twice more later in the season, with a three assist game against the Chicago Blackhawks on March 10, 2018, and a two goal, one assist game against the Florida Panthers on April 9, 2018. DeBrusk would end his rookie season with 16 goals and 27 assists.

As the season dwindled down, DeBrusk prepared for his first taste of Stanley Cup playoff action. The Bruins were set to play the Toronto Maple Leafs in the opening series of the 2018 Stanley Cup playoffs. DeBrusk would immediately establish himself as a playoff performer during the series, scoring five goals and two assists in the Bruins seven-game series victory. DeBrusk had a point in every game of the series except Game 3, including two goals, one of which was the series-winner, in the decisive Game 7. DeBrusk would continue where he left off in Game 1 of the Bruins' second round series against the Tampa Bay Lightning, scoring another goal in the Bruins 6–2 victory. However, the goodwill would end there, as the Bruins would lose four straight the lose the series in five, with DeBrusk being held scoreless in the four losses.

With a successful rookie season and playoff run behind him, DeBrusk looked to improve and continue his success in the 2018–19 season. DeBrusk battled a few injuries throughout the season, however, this did not stop him from producing, as he crushed his previous season goal total with 27 goals, as he helped the Bruins to yet another successful season.

Heading into the playoffs, DeBrusk and the Bruins were set for a rematch with the Maple Leafs in the opening round of the 2019 Stanley Cup playoffs. In Game 2 of the series, DeBrusk was cross-checked by Leafs forward Nazem Kadri, and although there was no penalty called and DeBrusk came away uninjured, the play resulted in Kadri being suspended for the rest of the series, causing some controversy amongst Leafs fans. Although DeBrusk could not repeat the same success he had against the Leafs the previous year, only scoring a goal and an assist in the series, the Bruins were able to once again beat the Leafs in seven.

DeBrusk looked to turn on the jets as the Bruins faced off against the Columbus Blue Jackets in the second round. Although DeBrusk did not record a point in the first two games of the series, he finished off the series strong, with a goal and two assists in the final four games, helping the Bruins advance to the Eastern Conference Finals, where DeBrusk and the Bruins would take care of the Carolina Hurricanes with ease. DeBrusk had a goal and an assist in a four game sweep of the Hurricanes. With the Bruins advancing to the Stanley Cup Finals, DeBrusk looked to win the elusive Stanley Cup against the St. Louis Blues. DeBrusk had his most productive series in the Finals, with a goal and three assists. However, the Bruins would lose the Cup in heartbreaking fashion, falling in seven games.

Trying to put last season's heartbreaking loss behind them, DeBrusk and the Bruins looked to start a revenge tour in the 2019–20 season. The Bruins and DeBrusk were doing just that, with the Bruins leading the league, and DeBrusk scoring 19 goals, until the season was suddenly postponed due to the COVID-19 pandemic.

Amidst the pandemic, the NHL announced that the rest of the regular season was cancelled, and that postseason play would start up in July 2020 in a bubble. DeBrusk ended his third season in the league with 19 goals and 16 assists. In 13 postseason games, which included a three game round robin, DeBrusk scored four goals. This included a two goal game in Game 4 of the Bruins first round series against the Hurricanes. However, the Bruins would fail to avenge their loss in the Final the previous season, as they fell in five games to the Lightning the following round.

==== Struggles and resurgence (2021–2024) ====
On November 23, 2020, DeBrusk signed a two-year, $7.35 million contract with the Bruins, with an annual cap hit of $3.675 million.

Due to the late ending of the previous season's postseason, and the pandemic, the NHL season was shortened and postponed to January. However, the 2020–21 season would be one to forget for DeBrusk, as his production drastically fell off, with only five goals and nine assists in 41 games. Woes continued when DeBrusk was placed in COVID-19 protocol on March 13, 2021. However, as the playoffs rolled by, DeBrusk seemed to hit his stride. He had three points in the final four games of the season, and had a goal in each of the Bruins' first two playoff games against the Washington Capitals. After registering an assist in Game 4 of the same series, however, DeBrusk went cold, and did not register a point for the rest of the Bruins' playoff run, which ended in a six-game series loss in the second round to the New York Islanders.

DeBrusk looked to put his previous season woes behind him as he entered the 2021–22 season. However, things did not seem to be going his way as the season began, which led to DeBrusk requesting a trade from the Bruins on November 29, 2021. Between the start of the season and the end of January, DeBrusk only had seven goals and eight assists, way below his expectations.

However, as January ended, DeBrusk rediscovered his goal-scoring touch, as he scored seven goals and two assists in the month of February, including on February 28, 2022, DeBrusk scored a natural hat trick, scoring the first three goals in a 7–0 victory over the Los Angeles Kings. Amidst the hot scoring streak, and playing with Bruins stars Patrice Bergeron and Brad Marchand, questions were raised whether DeBrusk had a change of heart about his trade request earlier in the season. However, his agent later reiterated that DeBrusk still wanted to be traded. On March 21, 2022, the day of the 2022 NHL Trade deadline, DeBrusk signed a two-year, $8 million extension with the Bruins. It was speculated the signing was meant to more easily facilitate a trade from Boston, as there had been no indication his earlier trade request had been rescinded; however the deadline passed without Debrusk being moved. Despite his request not being honored, DeBrusk continued his goalscoring, and ended the season with 25 goals and 17 assists. DeBrusk's goal-scoring would continue into the playoffs, as the Bruins would once again face the Hurricanes, and DeBrusk scored two goals and two assists in the seven game series, which the Bruins lost.

On July 5, 2022, it was reported that DeBrusk rescinded his trade request. The report came shortly after the Bruins fired head coach Bruce Cassidy, leading to questions whether Cassidy was the factor in DeBrusk's trade request and the later rescinding of it. DeBrusk neither confirmed or denied these rumors when asked about it later in the offseason during a captain's practice.

DeBrusk started the 2022–23 season where he left off, scoring three goals and four assists in the opening month of October. During the 2023 NHL Winter Classic, DeBrusk scored both goals in a 2–1 victory at Fenway Park over the Pittsburgh Penguins. However, in the same game, DeBrusk suffered multiple injuries, and was placed on LTIR a few days later, on January 5, 2023. It would not be until February 18 that DeBrusk would return, and in his comeback, he scored a goal and an assist in a 6–2 victory over the New York Islanders. DeBrusk continued his goalscoring, and finished the season with career high 50 points, and tying his career high in goals, with 27, despite missing time due to injury. The Bruins had a historic 2022–23 season, setting the regular season record for wins and points. However, this success would not carry into the playoffs, as they were upset in seven games in the opening round against the Florida Panthers. Despite the crushing loss, DeBrusk performed well in the series, with four goals and two assists.

Going into the final year of his contract, expectations were once again high for DeBrusk. However, his season started off slow, as he would not score a goal until November 3, 2023. However, like he had in the previous two years, DeBrusk was able to up his playing level as the season went on. In the month of March, DeBrusk scored five goals and seven assists in 14 games, helping the Bruins in their push to repeating as Atlantic Division champions. Unfortunately, a slow end for DeBrusk and the Bruins had them missing out on the title by one point to the Panthers, and once again setting up a matchup with the Maple Leafs in round one of the playoffs. Once again, DeBrusk showed off his knack for playoff performance, scoring two goals and an assist in Game 1 of the series. Although he would cool off as the series went on, the Bruins once again defeated the Maple Leafs in seven games.

=== Vancouver Canucks (2024–present) ===
On July 1, 2024, after seven seasons with the Bruins, DeBrusk signed a seven-year, $38.5 million contract with the Vancouver Canucks. DeBrusk finished the 2024–25 season with a career-best 28 goals and 48 points, but the Canucks missed the playoffs, falling six points short of a wildcard spot.

== Personal life ==
DeBrusk is the son of former NHL player and current Hockey Night in Canada broadcaster Louie DeBrusk, who played 401 NHL games for the Edmonton Oilers, Tampa Bay Lightning, Phoenix Coyotes, and Chicago Blackhawks.

== Career statistics ==
			Regular season					Playoffs
Season	Team	League	GP	G	A	Pts	PIM	GP	G	A	Pts	PIM
2011–12	SSAC Bulldogs	AMHL	26	13	20	33	24	5	2	4	6	10
2012–13	SSAC Athletics	AMHL	34	25	27	52	26	14	7	2	9	10
2013–14	Swift Current Broncos	WHL	72	15	24	39	21	6	3	1	4	0
2014–15	Swift Current Broncos	WHL	72	42	39	81	40	3	0	0	0	10
2015–16	Swift Current Broncos	WHL	24	9	17	26	15	—	—	—	—	—
2015–16	Red Deer Rebels	WHL	37	12	27	39	32	17	8	9	17	20
2016–17	Providence Bruins	AHL	74	19	30	49	30	17	6	3	9	4
2017–18	Boston Bruins	NHL	70	16	27	43	19	12	6	2	8	8
2018–19	Boston Bruins	NHL	68	27	15	42	18	24	4	7	11	10
2019–20	Boston Bruins	NHL	65	19	16	35	14	13	4	0	4	2
2020–21	Boston Bruins	NHL	41	5	9	14	6	10	2	1	3	2
2021–22	Boston Bruins	NHL	77	25	17	42	10	7	2	2	4	2
2022–23	Boston Bruins	NHL	64	27	23	50	16	7	4	2	6	10
2023–24	Boston Bruins	NHL	80	19	21	40	18	13	5	6	11	2
2024–25	Vancouver Canucks	NHL	82	28	20	48	18	—	—	—	—	—
2025–26	Vancouver Canucks	NHL	81	23	19	42	12	—	—	—	—	—
NHL totals			628	189	167	356	131	86	27	20	47	36

== Awards and honours ==
Honours	Year	Citations
CHL/NHL Top Prospects Game	2015	
Eddie Shore Award	2019	

Awards and achievements
Preceded by Jakub Zboril	Boston Bruins first-round draft pick 2015	Succeeded by Zachary Senyshyn
