= Kevin Lankinen =

Finnish ice hockey player (born 1995)

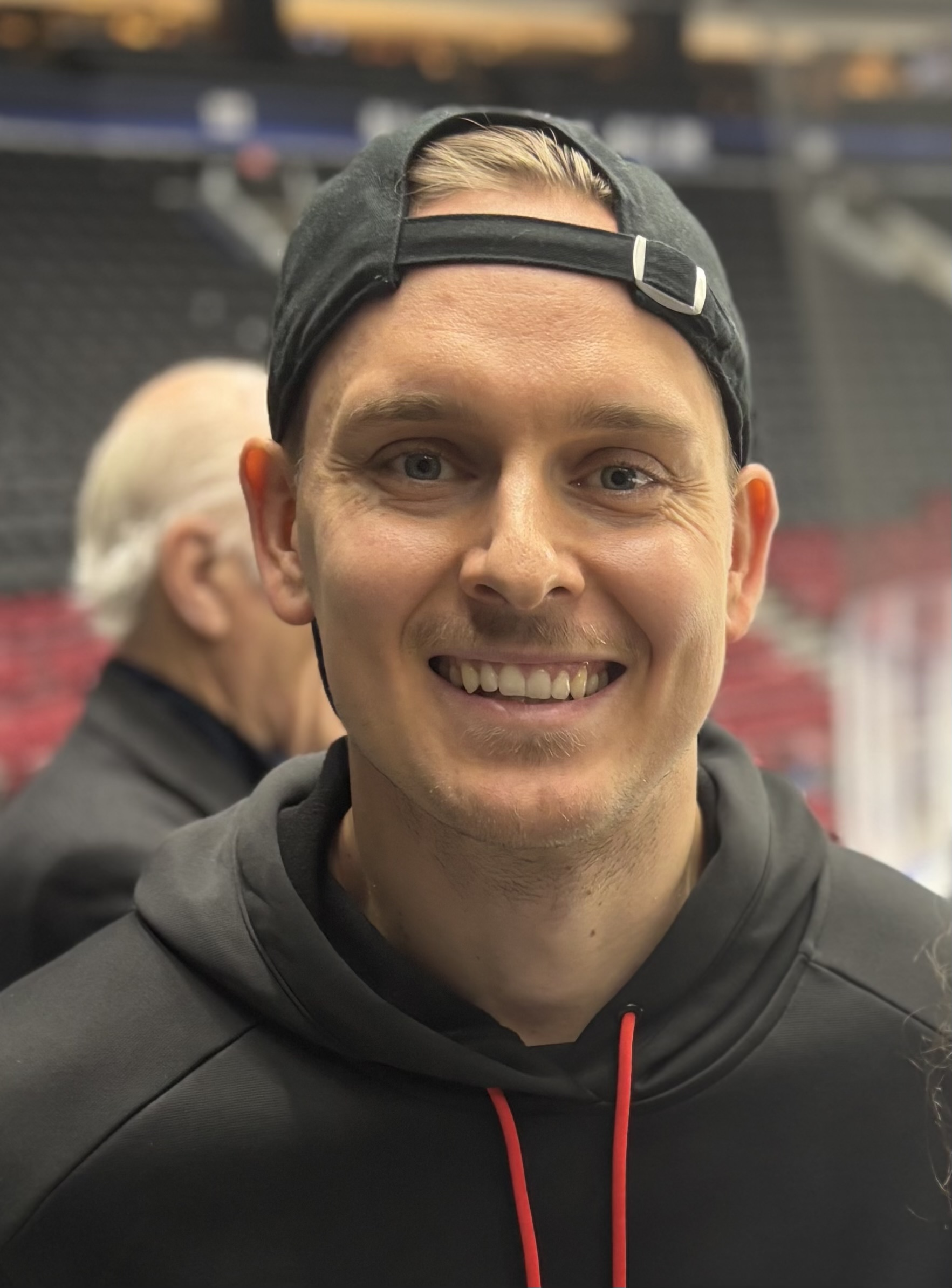
- Lankinen in 2026
- Born: 28 April 1995 (age 31) Helsinki, Finland
- Height: 6 ft 2 in (188 cm)
- Weight: 190 lb (86 kg; 13 st 8 lb)
- Position: Goaltender
- Catches: Left
- NHL team Former teams: Vancouver Canucks; Jokerit; HIFK; KooKoo; Chicago Blackhawks; Nashville Predators
- National team: Finland
- NHL draft: Undrafted
- Playing career: 2014–present

Kevin Lankinen (born 28 April 1995) is a Finnish professional ice hockey player who is a goaltender for the Vancouver Canucks of the National Hockey League (NHL). He has previously played for the Chicago Blackhawks and Nashville Predators.

== Playing career ==
=== Liiga ===
Lankinen has played primarily for HIFK of the Liiga from 2014 to 2018. He also played one match for Jokerit and two for KooKoo, and 10 for Kiekko-Vantaa of Mestis.

In 2014, Lankinen signed a three-year contract with HIFK. In the 2015 playoffs, he participated in the longest game in Liiga's history, lasting 134 minutes and 14 seconds. His team won 2–1 and advanced to the quarterfinals.

In the summer of 2015, Lankinen participated in the New York Islanders development camp.

During the 2015–16 season, Lankinen played alongside Ville Husso, playing 22 games in the regular season, as well as three in the playoffs as his team won silver medals. During the 2016–17 season, Lankinen was a secondary goaltender alongside the more experienced Niklas Bäckström, but due to Bäckström's injuries, he became the primary goaltender and played in 42 games, seven of which were shutouts, the most in the league that season.

During the 2017–18 season, Lankinen was injured and unable to play for a large portion of the season. However, he made a successful comeback by playing 15 games in the regular season with four shutouts and a save percentage of 94.58 percent. His goals against average (GAA) was 1.33, the lowest in the league that season. During the playoffs, he played as the primary goaltender for 13 games with a save percentage of 93.56 percent, helping his team win bronze medals. He was in the running for the Urpo Ylönen trophy, which is awarded to the best goaltender of the season, alongside Veini Vehviläinen from Oulun Kärpät and Dominik Hrachovina from Tappara, but the award went to Vehviläinen.

=== Chicago Blackhawks ===
On 21 May 2018, Lankinen signed a two-year, entry-level contract with the Chicago Blackhawks of the National Hockey League (NHL).

In his second season with the Blackhawks' American Hockey League (AHL) affiliate, the Rockford IceHogs, in the 2019–20 season, Lankinen made 21 appearances, earning eight wins and represented the IceHogs as the teams' lone representative at the 2020 AHL All-Star Game. On 5 March 2020, Lankinen was ruled out for the remainder of the 2019–20 season after undergoing shoulder surgery, with a recovery period of five months.

On 19 January 2021, Lankinen made his NHL debut, losing 5–4 in overtime to the Florida Panthers. On 22 January, Lankinen earned his first NHL win in a 4–1 win against the Detroit Red Wings. His first NHL shutout came on 17 February, in the Blackhawks' 2–0 win over the Detroit Red Wings. His 2020—21 season record was 17–14–5.

During the 2021—22 season, Lankinen served as the backup to Marc-André Fleury. Lankinen struggled to begin the season, not recording his first win until 7 November 2021, in a game against the Nashville Predators. After Fleury was traded to the Minnesota Wild, Lankinen became the starter, leading the team to a 5–9–3 record following the trade. He ended the season with a 8–15–6 record and a 3.50 goals against average.

=== Nashville Predators ===
As a free agent from the Blackhawks, on 14 July 2022, Lankinen was signed to a one-year, $1.5 million contract with the Nashville Predators. He was brought in to serve as a backup to Juuse Saros. On 3 March 2023, the Predators signed Lankinen to a one-year, $2 million contract extension. Across his two seasons in Nashville, Lankinen posted a 20–14–1 record and a .912 save percentage.

=== Vancouver Canucks ===
On 21 September 2024, Lankinen agreed to a one-year, $875,000 contract with the Vancouver Canucks. On 1 December, Lankinen recorded a 5–4 overtime win over the Detroit Red Wings, becoming the first goaltender in NHL history to win 10 consecutive road games to begin a season.

On 21 February 2025, Lankinen signed a five-year, $22.5 million contract extension with the Canucks.

Lankinen has proven exceptionally capable in shootouts, possessing the highest career shootout save percentage in NHL history.

== International play ==
Medal record

Men's ice hockey

Representing Finland

Olympic Games
Bronze medal – third place	2026 Milano Cortina	

World Championships
Gold medal – first place	2019 Slovakia	

Lankinen represented Finland national team in the 2019 World Championship, winning gold. Throughout the tournament, he had the second-highest save percentage of 94.20% and a goals against average of 1.50. He served as the goaltender for each playoff game.

He represented Finland at the 2026 Winter Olympics and won a bronze medal.

== Personal life ==
Lankinen likes to read and names Sapiens by Yuval Noah Harari as his favourite book. Another favourite of his is The Dirt – an autobiography of Mötley Crüe. Lankinen has opened a Facebook-based book club with Finnish publisher WSOY.

== Career statistics ==
=== Regular season and playoffs ===
			Regular season									Playoffs
Season	Team	League	GP	W	L	T/OT	MIN	GA	SO	GAA	SV%	GP	W	L	MIN	GA	SO	GAA	SV%
2011–12	Jokerit	Jr. A	2	—	—	—	—	—	—	1.00	.950	—	—	—	—	—	—	—	—
2012–13	Jokerit	Jr. A	23	—	—	—	—	—	—	2.92	.910	—	—	—	—	—	—	—	—
2013–14	Jokerit	Jr. A	36	—	—	—	—	83	—	2.33	.917	4	—	—	—	9	—	2.09	.931
2013–14	Jokerit	Liiga	1	0	0	0	17	2	0	7.16	.667	—	—	—	—	—	—	—	—
2014–15	Kiekko-Vantaa	Mestis	10	—	—	—	—	—	—	3.29	.906	—	—	—	—	—	—	—	—
2014–15	HIFK	Liiga	24	8	10	5	1,307	50	0	2.29	.911	6	3	2	414	12	0	1.74	.933
2015–16	HIFK	Liiga	22	12	5	4	1,294	51	0	2.36	.906	3	1	2	180	10	0	3.33	.891
2015–16	KooKoo	Liiga	2	0	0	2	128	5	0	2.34	.919	—	—	—	—	—	—	—	—
2016–17	HIFK	Liiga	42	13	19	9	2,443	87	7	2.14	.920	13	6	6	768	32	0	2.50	.906
2017–18	HIFK	Liiga	15	10	3	2	900	20	4	1.33	.940	13	7	5	756	25	0	1.99	.934
2017–18	Ketterä	Mestis	2	—	—	—	—	—	—	1.50	.924	—	—	—	—	—	—	—	—
2018–19	Rockford IceHogs	AHL	19	7	8	4	1,151	48	0	2.50	.910	—	—	—	—	—	—	—	—
2018–19	Indy Fuel	ECHL	6	4	2	0	358	19	0	3.18	.893	—	—	—	—	—	—	—	—
2019–20	Rockford IceHogs	AHL	21	8	10	2	1,190	60	0	3.03	.909	—	—	—	—	—	—	—	—
2020–21	Chicago Blackhawks	NHL	37	17	14	5	2,174	109	2	3.01	.909	—	—	—	—	—	—	—	—
2021–22	Chicago Blackhawks	NHL	32	8	15	6	1,816	106	0	3.50	.891	—	—	—	—	—	—	—	—
2022–23	Nashville Predators	NHL	19	9	8	1	1,070	49	0	2.75	.916	—	—	—	—	—	—	—	—
2023–24	Nashville Predators	NHL	24	11	6	0	1,191	56	1	2.82	.908	—	—	—	—	—	—	—	—
2024–25	Vancouver Canucks	NHL	51	25	15	10	3,020	132	4	2.62	.902	—	—	—	—	—	—	—	—
2025–26	Vancouver Canucks	NHL	47	11	27	5	2,592	160	0	3.70	.875	—	—	—	—	—	—	—	—
Liiga totals			105	43	37	22	6,073	213	11	2.10	.918	35	17	15	2118	79	0	2.24	.921
NHL totals			210	81	85	27	11,863	612	7	3.10	.898	—	—	—	—	—	—	—	—

=== International ===
Year	Team	Event	Result	GP	W	L	T	MIN	GA	SO	GAA	SV%
2019	Finland	WC	1st place, gold medalist(s)	8	7	1	0	481	12	2	1.50	.942
2025	Finland	4NF	4th	2	1	1	0	87	7	0	4.84	.811
Senior totals				10	8	2	0	568	19	2	2.01	.922

== Awards and honours ==
Award	Year	Ref
Jr. A
Jorma Valtonen Award	2014	
First All-Star Team	2014	
AHL
AHL All-Star Game	2020	
