= 2024–25 Dallas Stars season =

National Hockey League season

2024–25 Dallas Stars
- Division: 2nd Central
- Conference: 3rd Western
- 2024–25 record: 50–26–6
- Home record: 28–10–3
- Road record: 22–16–3
- Goals for: 277
- Goals against: 224

Team information
- General manager: Jim Nill
- Coach: Peter DeBoer
- Captain: Jamie Benn
- Alternate captains: Miro Heiskanen; Roope Hintz; Esa Lindell; Tyler Seguin
- Arena: American Airlines Center
- Average attendance: 18,392
- Minor league affiliates: Texas Stars (AHL); Idaho Steelheads (ECHL)

Team leaders
- Goals: Jason Robertson (35)
- Assists: Matt Duchene (51)
- Points: Matt Duchene (81)
- Penalty minutes: Jamie Benn (70)
- Plus/minus: Esa Lindell (+35)
- Wins: Jake Oettinger (36)
- Goals against average: Jake Oettinger (2.53)

The 2024–25 Dallas Stars season was the 58th season for the National Hockey League (NHL) franchise that was established on June 5, 1967, and the 32nd season since the franchise relocated from Minnesota prior to the start of the 1993–94 season.

On March 29, 2025, the Stars clinched a playoff spot for the fourth straight season and sixth in the last seven seasons with a win over the Seattle Kraken.

In the playoffs, the Stars defeated the Colorado Avalanche in the first round in seven games, defeated the Winnipeg Jets in the second round in six games, but lost to the Edmonton Oilers in five games in conference finals.

== Standings ==
=== Divisional standings ===
Central Division
Pos	Team	GP	W	L	OTL	RW	GF	GA	GD	Pts
1	p – Winnipeg Jets	82	56	22	4	43	277	191	+86	116
2	x – Dallas Stars	82	50	26	6	41	277	224	+53	106
3	x – Colorado Avalanche	82	49	29	4	40	277	234	+43	102
4	x – Minnesota Wild	82	45	30	7	33	228	239	−11	97
5	x – St. Louis Blues	82	44	30	8	32	254	233	+21	96
6	Utah Hockey Club	82	38	31	13	30	241	251	−10	89
7	Nashville Predators	82	30	44	8	24	214	274	−60	68
8	Chicago Blackhawks	82	25	46	11	20	226	296	−70	61

Source: National Hockey League
Rules for classification: 1) Fewer number of games played (GP, only during regular season); 2) Greater number of regulation wins (RW); 3) Greater number of wins in regulation and overtime, excluding shootout wins (ROW); 4) Greater number of total wins, including shootouts (W); 5) Greater number of points earned in head-to-head play; if teams played an uneven number of head-to-head games, the result of the first game on the home ice of the team with the extra home game is discarded; 6) Greater goal differential (GD); 7) Greater number of goals scored (GF)
p – Clinched Presidents' Trophy; x – Clinched playoff spot

=== Conference standings ===
Western Conference Wild Card
Pos	Div	Team	GP	W	L	OTL	RW	GF	GA	GD	Pts
1	CE	x – Minnesota Wild	82	45	30	7	33	228	239	−11	97
2	CE	x – St. Louis Blues	82	44	30	8	32	254	233	+21	96
3	PA	Calgary Flames	82	41	27	14	31	225	238	−13	96
4	PA	Vancouver Canucks	82	38	30	14	28	236	253	−17	90
5	CE	Utah Hockey Club	82	38	31	13	30	241	251	−10	89
6	PA	Anaheim Ducks	82	35	37	10	24	221	263	−42	80
7	PA	Seattle Kraken	82	35	41	6	28	247	265	−18	76
8	CE	Nashville Predators	82	30	44	8	24	214	274	−60	68
9	CE	Chicago Blackhawks	82	25	46	11	20	226	296	−70	61
10	PA	San Jose Sharks	82	20	50	12	14	210	315	−105	52

Source: National Hockey League
Rules for classification: 1) Fewer number of games played (GP, only during regular season); 2) Greater number of regulation wins (RW); 3) Greater number of wins in regulation and overtime, excluding shootout wins (ROW); 4) Greater number of total wins, including shootouts (W); 5) Greater number of points earned in head-to-head play; if teams played an uneven number of head-to-head games, the result of the first game on the home ice of the team with the extra home game is discarded; 6) Greater goal differential (GD); 7) Greater number of goals scored (GF)
x – Clinched playoff spot

== Schedule and results ==
=== Preseason ===
The Stars preseason schedule was released on June 20, 2024.

2024 preseason game log: 5–0–1 (Home: 3–0–0; Road: 2–0–1)

#	Date	Visitor	Score	Home	OT	Decision	Location	Attendance	Record
1	September 21	St. Louis	1–2	Dallas		Hellberg	American Airlines Center	15,765	1–0–0
2	September 23	Dallas	3–2	Colorado		Poirier	Ball Arena	15,006	2–0–0
3	September 25	Minnesota	2–5	Dallas		Oettinger	American Airlines Center	14,311	3–0–0
4	September 27	Colorado	2–4	Dallas		Kraws	American Airlines Center	15,914	4–0–0
5	September 29	Dallas	4–2	Minnesota		DeSmith	Xcel Energy Center	17,373	5–0–0
6	October 3	Dallas	3–4	St. Louis	OT	Oettinger	Enterprise Center	16,386	5–0–1

Legend: = Win = Loss = OT/SO Loss

=== Regular season ===
The Stars regular season schedule was released on July 2, 2024.

2024–25 game log
October: 7–2–0 (Home: 5–0–0; Road: 2–2–0)

#	Date	Visitor	Score	Home	OT	Decision	Location	Attendance	Record	Points	Recap
1	October 10	Dallas	4–3	Nashville		Oettinger	Bridgestone Arena	17,544	1–0–0	2	
2	October 12	NY Islanders	0–3	Dallas		Oettinger	American Airlines Center	18,532	2–0–0	4	
3	October 13	Seattle	0–2	Dallas		DeSmith	American Airlines Center	18,532	3–0–0	6	
4	October 15	San Jose	2–3	Dallas	SO	Oettinger	American Airlines Center	18,532	4–0–0	8	
5	October 17	Dallas	2–3	Washington		DeSmith	Capital One Arena	17,034	4–1–0	8	
6	October 19	Edmonton	1–4	Dallas		Oettinger	American Airlines Center	18,532	5–1–0	10	
7	October 22	Dallas	2–4	Buffalo		Oettinger	KeyBank Center	13,014	5–2–0	10	
8	October 24	Dallas	5–2	Boston		DeSmith	TD Garden	17,850	6–2–0	12	
9	October 26	Chicago	2–4	Dallas		Oettinger	American Airlines Center	18,532	7–2–0	14	

November: 7–6–0 (Home: 4–2–0; Road: 3–4–0)

#	Date	Visitor	Score	Home	OT	Decision	Location	Attendance	Record	Points	Recap
10^{A}	November 1	Florida	6–4	Dallas		Oettinger	Nokia Arena	12,786	7–3–0	14	
11^{A}	November 2	Dallas	2–4	Florida		DeSmith	Nokia Arena	12,807	7–4–0	14	
12	November 7	Chicago	1–3	Dallas		Oettinger	American Airlines Center	18,532	8–4–0	16	
13	November 9	Dallas	1–4	Winnipeg		Oettinger	Canada Life Centre	15,225	8–5–0	16	
14	November 11	Dallas	7–1	Pittsburgh		Oettinger	PPG Paints Arena	16,526	9–5–0	18	
15	November 14	Boston	2–7	Dallas		Oettinger	American Airlines Center	18,532	10–5–0	20	
16	November 16	Dallas	2–1	Minnesota		Oettinger	Xcel Energy Center	18,143	11–5–0	22	
17	November 18	Anaheim	4–2	Dallas		DeSmith	American Airlines Center	18,532	11–6–0	22	
18	November 20	San Jose	2–5	Dallas		Oettinger	American Airlines Center	18,532	12–6–0	24	
19	November 23	Dallas	4–2	Tampa Bay		Oettinger	Amalie Arena	19,092	13–6–0	26	
20	November 25	Dallas	4–6	Carolina		Oettinger	Lenovo Center	18,812	13–7–0	26	
21	November 27	Dallas	2–6	Chicago		DeSmith	United Center	19,144	13–8–0	26	
22	November 29	Colorado	3–5	Dallas		Oettinger	American Airlines Center	18,532	14–8–0	28	

December: 8–5–1 (Home: 5–3–1; Road: 3–2–0)

#	Date	Visitor	Score	Home	OT	Decision	Location	Attendance	Record	Points	Recap
23	December 1	Winnipeg	1–3	Dallas		Oettinger	American Airlines Center	18,532	15–8–0	30	
24	December 2	Dallas	2–1	Utah		DeSmith	Delta Center	11,131	16–8–0	32	
25	December 4	Dallas	2–3	Los Angeles		Oettinger	Crypto.com Arena	15,010	16–9–0	32	
26	December 6	Dallas	2–3	Vegas		Oettinger	T-Mobile Arena	17,961	16–10–0	32	
27	December 8	Calgary	2–6	Dallas		Oettinger	American Airlines Center	18,532	17–10–0	34	
28	December 12	Nashville	4–1	Dallas		Oettinger	American Airlines Center	18,532	17–11–0	34	
29	December 14	St. Louis	1–2	Dallas	OT	Oettinger	American Airlines Center	18,532	18–11–0	36	
30	December 16	Washington	1–3	Dallas		Oettinger	American Airlines Center	18,532	19–11–0	38	
31	December 18	Toronto	5–3	Dallas		Oettinger	American Airlines Center	18,532	19–12–0	38	
32	December 20	NY Rangers	3–1	Dallas		Oettinger	American Airlines Center	18,532	19–13–0	38	
33	December 23	Dallas	3–2	Utah		DeSmith	Delta Center	11,131	20–13–0	40	
34	December 27	Minnesota	3–2	Dallas	OT	Oettinger	American Airlines Center	18,532	20–13–1	41	
35	December 29	Dallas	5–1	Chicago		Oettinger	United Center	20,627	21–13–1	43	
36	December 31	Buffalo	2–4	Dallas		DeSmith	American Airlines Center	18,532	22–13–1	45	

January: 11–4–0 (Home: 5–2–0; Road: 6–2–0)

#	Date	Visitor	Score	Home	OT	Decision	Location	Attendance	Record	Points	Recap
37	January 2	Ottawa	2–4	Dallas		Oettinger	American Airlines Center	18,532	23–13–1	47	
38	January 4	Utah	2–3	Dallas	OT	Oettinger	American Airlines Center	18,532	24–13–1	49	
39	January 7	Dallas	5–4	NY Rangers	OT	Oettinger	Madison Square Garden	17,528	25–13–1	51	
40	January 9	Dallas	4–1	Philadelphia		DeSmith	Wells Fargo Center	17,941	26–13–1	53	
41	January 11	Dallas	2–1	Montreal	SO	Oettinger	Bell Centre	21,105	27–13–1	55	
42	January 12	Dallas	2–3	Ottawa		DeSmith	Canadian Tire Centre	17,653	27–14–1	55	
43	January 14	Dallas	4–1	Toronto		Oettinger	Scotiabank Arena	18,535	28–14–1	57	
44	January 16	Montreal	3–1	Dallas		Oettinger	American Airlines Center	18,532	28–15–1	57	
45	January 18	Dallas	3–6	Colorado		DeSmith	Ball Arena	18,055	28–16–1	57	
46	January 19	Detroit	1–4	Dallas		Oettinger	American Airlines Center	18,532	29–16–1	59	
47	January 21	Carolina	2–1	Dallas		Oettinger	American Airlines Center	18,532	29–17–1	59	
48	January 24	Vegas	3–4	Dallas		Oettinger	American Airlines Center	18,532	30–17–1	61	
49	January 25	Dallas	2–0	St. Louis		DeSmith	Enterprise Center	17,755	31–17–1	63	
50	January 28	Dallas	4–3	Vegas	OT	Oettinger	T-Mobile Arena	17,811	32–17–1	65	
51	January 31	Vancouver	3–5	Dallas		Oettinger	American Airlines Center	18,532	33–17–1	67	

February: 5–2–1 (Home: 2–0–0; Road: 3–2–1)

#	Date	Visitor	Score	Home	OT	Decision	Location	Attendance	Record	Points	Recap
52	February 2	Columbus	3–5	Dallas		DeSmith	American Airlines Center	18,532	34–17–1	69	
53	February 4	Dallas	1–2	Anaheim		Oettinger	Honda Center	16,714	34–18–1	69	
54	February 7	Dallas	4–5	Los Angeles	SO	Oettinger	Crypto.com Arena	18,145	34–18–2	70	
55	February 8	Dallas	8–3	San Jose		DeSmith	SAP Center	17,435	35–18–2	72	
56	February 22	Dallas	4–2	New Jersey		DeSmith	Prudential Center	16,514	36–18–2	74	
57	February 23	Dallas	4–3	NY Islanders		Oettinger	UBS Arena	16,602	37–18–2	76	
58	February 25	Dallas	4–6	Columbus		Oettinger	Nationwide Arena	16,897	37–19–2	76	
59	February 28	Los Angeles	2–6	Dallas		Oettinger	American Airlines Center	18,532	38–19–2	78	

March: 11–2–2 (Home: 6–0–1; Road: 5–2–1)

#	Date	Visitor	Score	Home	OT	Decision	Location	Attendance	Record	Points	Recap
60	March 2	St. Louis	3–6	Dallas		Oettinger	American Airlines Center	18,532	39–19–2	80	
61	March 4	New Jersey	3–4	Dallas		DeSmith	American Airlines Center	18,532	40–19–2	82	
62	March 6	Calgary	2–3	Dallas	OT	Oettinger	American Airlines Center	18,532	41–19–2	84	
63	March 8	Dallas	4–5	Edmonton		Oettinger	Rogers Place	18,347	41–20–2	84	
64	March 9	Dallas	4–1	Vancouver		DeSmith	Rogers Arena	18,656	42–20–2	86	
65	March 14	Dallas	1–4	Winnipeg		Oettinger	Canada Life Centre	15,225	42–21–2	86	
66	March 16	Dallas	3–4	Colorado	OT	Oettinger	Ball Arena	18,131	42–21–3	87	
67	March 18	Anaheim	3–4	Dallas	OT	Oettinger	American Airlines Center	18,532	43–21–3	89	
68	March 20	Tampa Bay	3–2	Dallas	SO	DeSmith	American Airlines Center	18,532	43–21–4	90	
69	March 22	Philadelphia	2–3	Dallas	OT	Oettinger	American Airlines Center	18,532	44–21–4	92	
70	March 24	Minnesota	0–3	Dallas		Oettinger	American Airlines Center	18,532	45–21–4	94	
71	March 26	Dallas	4–3	Edmonton		Oettinger	Rogers Place	18,347	46–21–4	96	
72	March 27	Dallas	5–2	Calgary		DeSmith	Scotiabank Saddledome	17,737	47–21–4	98	
73	March 29	Dallas	5–1	Seattle		Oettinger	Climate Pledge Arena	17,151	48–21–4	100	
74	March 31	Dallas	3–1	Seattle		DeSmith	Climate Pledge Arena	17,151	49–21–4	102	

April: 1–5–2 (Home: 1–3–1; Road: 0–2–1)

#	Date	Visitor	Score	Home	OT	Decision	Location	Attendance	Record	Points	Recap
75	April 3	Nashville	1–5	Dallas		Oettinger	American Airlines Center	18,532	50–21–4	104	
76	April 5	Pittsburgh	5–3	Dallas		DeSmith	American Airlines Center	18,532	50–22–4	104	
77	April 6	Dallas	2–3	Minnesota	OT	Oettinger	Xcel Energy Center	18,548	50–22–5	105	
78	April 8	Vancouver	6–5	Dallas	OT	DeSmith	American Airlines Center	18,532	50–22–6	106	
79	April 10	Winnipeg	4–0	Dallas		Oettinger	American Airlines Center	18,532	50–23–6	106	
80	April 12	Utah	5–3	Dallas		DeSmith	American Airlines Center	18,532	50–24–6	106	
81	April 14	Dallas	4–6	Detroit		Oettinger	Little Caesars Arena	18,669	50–25–6	106	
82	April 16	Dallas	1–5	Nashville		Oettinger	Bridgestone Arena	17,330	50–26–6	106	

Win (2 points) Loss (0 points) Overtime/shootout loss (1 point) ^{A} – Game played in Tampere, Finland as part of the NHL Global Series

=== Playoffs ===
2025 Stanley Cup playoffs
Western Conference first round vs. (C3) Colorado Avalanche: Dallas won 4–3

#	Date	Visitor	Score	Home	OT	Decision	Attendance	Series	Recap
1	April 19	Colorado	5–1	Dallas		Oettinger	18,532	0–1	
2	April 21	Colorado	3–4	Dallas	OT	Oettinger	18,532	1–1	
3	April 23	Dallas	2–1	Colorado	OT	Oettinger	18,109	2–1	
4	April 26	Dallas	0–4	Colorado		Oettinger	18,129	2–2	
5	April 28	Colorado	2–6	Dallas		Oettinger	18,532	3–2	
6	May 1	Dallas	4–7	Colorado		Oettinger	18,099	3–3	
7	May 3	Colorado	2–4	Dallas		Oettinger	18,532	4–3	

Western Conference second round vs. (C1) Winnipeg Jets: Dallas won 4–2

#	Date	Visitor	Score	Home	OT	Decision	Attendance	Series	Recap
1	May 7	Dallas	3–2	Winnipeg		Oettinger	15,225	1–0	
2	May 9	Dallas	0–4	Winnipeg		Oettinger	15,225	1–1	
3	May 11	Winnipeg	2–5	Dallas		Oettinger	18,532	2–1	
4	May 13	Winnipeg	1–3	Dallas		Oettinger	18,532	3–1	
5	May 15	Dallas	0–4	Winnipeg		Oettinger	15,225	3–2	
6	May 17	Winnipeg	1–2	Dallas	OT	Oettinger	18,532	4–2	

Western Conference finals vs. (P3) Edmonton Oilers: Edmonton won 4–1

#	Date	Visitor	Score	Home	OT	Decision	Attendance	Series	Recap
1	May 21	Edmonton	3–6	Dallas		Oettinger	18,532	1–0	
2	May 23	Edmonton	3–0	Dallas		Oettinger	18,532	1–1	
3	May 25	Dallas	1–6	Edmonton		Oettinger	18,347	1–2	
4	May 27	Dallas	1–4	Edmonton		Oettinger	18,347	1–3	
5	May 29	Edmonton	6–3	Dallas		DeSmith	18,532	1–4	

Legend: Win Loss

== Player statistics ==
Updated as of May 29, 2025

=== Skaters ===
Regular season
Player	GP	G	A	Pts	+/–	PIM
Matt Duchene	82	30	52	82	+13	12
Jason Robertson	82	35	45	80	+10	18
Wyatt Johnston	82	33	38	71	+2	14
Roope Hintz	76	28	39	67	+18	30
Thomas Harley	78	16	34	50	+32	16
Jamie Benn	80	16	33	49	+3	70
Mason Marchment	62	22	25	47	+15	53
Evgenii Dadonov	80	20	20	40	+1	10
Logan Stankoven^{‡}	59	9	20	29	+2	6
Esa Lindell	80	5	21	26	+34	14
Mavrik Bourque	73	11	14	25	+6	8
Sam Steel	79	6	19	25	–6	31
Miro Heiskanen	50	5	20	25	+7	10
Tyler Seguin	20	9	12	21	+15	4
Mikael Granlund^{†}	31	7	14	21	+8	8
Mikko Rantanen^{‡}	20	5	13	18	+4	22
Colin Blackwell	63	6	11	17	+4	16
Oskar Back	73	4	12	16	+1	8
Ilya Lyubushkin	80	1	13	14	+5	32
Matt Dumba	63	1	9	10	−5	60
Lian Bichsel	38	4	5	9	+2	41
Cody Ceci^{†}	31	0	9	9	+15	10
Brendan Smith	32	1	5	6	−9	33
Nils Lundkvist	39	0	5	5	+4	20
Matej Blumel	7	1	0	1	−1	0
Justin Hryckowian	5	0	1	1	+1	0
Arttu Hyry	5	0	1	1	0	0
Alex Petrovic	5	0	0	0	–2	4
Kyle Capobianco	1	0	0	0	−2	4

Playoffs
Player	GP	G	A	Pts	+/–	PIM
Mikko Rantanen	18	9	13	22	–3	10
Thomas Harley	18	4	10	14	–10	10
Roope Hintz	17	6	6	12	–2	10
Mikael Granlund	18	5	5	10	–2	8
Wyatt Johnston	18	4	6	10	–16	6
Tyler Seguin	18	4	4	8	–3	10
Sam Steel	18	1	6	7	–1	18
Jason Robertson	11	4	2	6	–5	2
Matt Duchene	18	1	5	6	–16	6
Mason Marchment	18	1	4	5	–5	18
Evgenii Dadonov	16	1	3	4	–3	2
Miro Heiskanen	8	1	3	4	–4	0
Jamie Benn	18	1	2	3	–11	26
Cody Ceci	18	0	3	3	–6	2
Ilya Lyubushkin	14	0	3	3	–7	4
Alex Petrovic	17	1	1	2	–1	4
Esa Lindell	18	1	1	2	–3	4
Oskar Back	11	0	2	2	–2	2
Colin Blackwell	11	1	0	1	–5	6
Lian Bichsel	18	0	1	1	0	28
Mavrik Bourque	3	0	0	0	–1	2

=== Goaltenders ===
Regular season
Player	GP	GS	TOI	W	L	OT	GA	GAA	SA	SV%	SO	G	A	PIM
Jake Oettinger	58	58	3,410:04	36	18	4	147	2.59	1,611	.909	2	0	1	0
Casey DeSmith	27	24	1,504:30	14	8	2	65	2.59	761	.915	2	0	1	2

Playoffs
Player	GP	GS	TOI	W	L	GA	GAA	SA	SV%	SO	G	A	PIM
Jake Oettinger	18	18	1,021:21	9	8	48	2.82	503	.905	0	0	0	2
Casey DeSmith	2	0	70:06	0	1	4	3.42	34	.882	0	0	0	0

^{†}Denotes player spent time with another team before joining the Stars. Stats reflect time with the Stars only.
^{‡}Denotes player was traded mid-season. Stats reflect time with the Stars only.
Bold/italics denotes franchise record.

== Transactions ==
The Stars have been involved in the following transactions during the 2024–25 season.

Key:

† Contract is entry-level.
‡ Contract initially takes effect in the 2025–26 season.

=== Trades ===
Date	Details		Ref
June 29, 2024	To Toronto Maple Leafs Christopher Tanev	To Dallas Stars Max Ellis; 7th-round pick in 2026	
July 2, 2024	To St. Louis Blues Radek Faksa	To Dallas Stars Future considerations	
January 25, 2025	To San Jose Sharks 1st-round pick in 2025 conditional 3rd-round pick in 2025 or WPG 4th-round pick in 2025	To Dallas Stars Cody Ceci; Mikael Granlund	
March 7, 2025	To Carolina Hurricanes Logan Stankoven conditional 1st-round pick in 2026 or 1st-round pick in 2027; 3rd-round pick in 2026; 3rd-round pick in 2027 conditional 1st-round pick in 2028 or 1st-round pick in 2029	To Dallas Stars Mikko Rantanen	

=== Players acquired ===
Date	Player	Former team	Term	Via	Ref
July 1, 2024	Kyle Capobianco	Winnipeg Jets	2-year	Free agency	
July 1, 2024	Casey DeSmith	Vancouver Canucks	3-year	Free agency	
July 1, 2024	Matt Dumba	Tampa Bay Lightning	2-year	Free agency	
July 1, 2024	Cameron Hughes	Seattle Kraken	1-year	Free agency	
July 1, 2024	Kole Lind	Seattle Kraken	1-year	Free agency	
July 1, 2024	Ilya Lyubushkin	Toronto Maple Leafs	3-year	Free agency	
July 1, 2024	Brendan Smith	New Jersey Devils	1-year	Free agency	
July 2, 2024	Colin Blackwell	Chicago Blackhawks	1-year	Free agency	
August 14, 2024	Magnus Hellberg	Florida Panthers	1-year	Free agency	

=== Players lost ===
Date	Player	New team	Term	Via	Ref
July 1, 2024	Matt Murray	Nashville Predators	2-year	Free agency	
July 1, 2024	Derrick Pouliot	Tampa Bay Lightning	1-year	Free agency	
July 1, 2024	Craig Smith	Chicago Blackhawks	2-year	Free agency	
July 1, 2024	Scott Wedgewood	Nashville Predators	2-year	Free agency	
July 2, 2024	Fredrik Karlstrom	New York Islanders	1-year	Free agency	
July 10, 2024	Ryan Suter	St. Louis Blues	1-year	Free agency	
July 16, 2024	Joe Pavelski			Retirement	
September 11, 2024	Jani Hakanpaa	Toronto Maple Leafs	1-year	Free agency	

=== Signings ===
Date	Player	Term	Ref
July 16, 2024	Emil Hemming	3-year†	
September 17, 2024	Esa Lindell	5-year‡	
October 17, 2024	Jake Oettinger	8-year‡	
January 2, 2025	Oskar Back	2-year‡	
February 14, 2025	Sam Steel	2-year‡	
March 6, 2025	Angus MacDonell	3-year†‡	
March 7, 2025	Mikko Rantanen	8-year‡	
March 8, 2025	Wyatt Johnston	5-year‡	

== Draft picks ==
Below are the Dallas Stars selections at the 2024 NHL entry draft, which was held on June 28 and 29, 2024, at the Sphere in Las Vegas, Nevada.

Round	#	Player	Pos	Nationality	College/Junior/Club (League)
1	29	Emil Hemming	RW	Finland	HC TPS (Liiga)
5	158	Niilopekka Muhonen	D	Finland	KalPa (U20 SM-sarja)
7	222	William Samuelsson	C	Sweden	Södertälje SK (J20 Nationell)
