= 2024–25 Nashville Predators season =

National Hockey League season

2024–25 Nashville Predators
- Division: 7th Central
- Conference: 14th Western
- 2024–25 record: 30–44–8
- Home record: 20–18–3
- Road record: 10–26–5
- Goals for: 214
- Goals against: 274

Team information
- General manager: Barry Trotz
- Coach: Andrew Brunette
- Captain: Roman Josi
- Alternate captains: Filip Forsberg; Ryan O'Reilly
- Arena: Bridgestone Arena
- Average attendance: 17,212
- Minor league affiliates: Milwaukee Admirals (AHL); Atlanta Gladiators (ECHL)

Team leaders
- Goals: Filip Forsberg (31)
- Assists: Filip Forsberg (43)
- Points: Filip Forsberg (74)
- Penalty minutes: Michael McCarron (102)
- Plus/minus: Kevin Gravel; Adam Wilsby (+3)
- Wins: Juuse Saros (19)
- Goals against average: Juuso Saros (3.02)

The 2024–25 Nashville Predators season was the 26th season for the National Hockey League (NHL) franchise that was established on June 25, 1997.

On March 27, 2025, the Predators were eliminated from playoff contention after a loss to the St. Louis Blues. The Predators finished with a losing record for the first time since the 2012–13 season, and their first in an 82-game season since 2002-03.

== Standings ==
=== Divisional standings ===
Central Division
Pos	Team	GP	W	L	OTL	RW	GF	GA	GD	Pts
1	p – Winnipeg Jets	82	56	22	4	43	277	191	+86	116
2	x – Dallas Stars	82	50	26	6	41	277	224	+53	106
3	x – Colorado Avalanche	82	49	29	4	40	277	234	+43	102
4	x – Minnesota Wild	82	45	30	7	33	228	239	−11	97
5	x – St. Louis Blues	82	44	30	8	32	254	233	+21	96
6	Utah Hockey Club	82	38	31	13	30	241	251	−10	89
7	Nashville Predators	82	30	44	8	24	214	274	−60	68
8	Chicago Blackhawks	82	25	46	11	20	226	296	−70	61

Source: National Hockey League
Rules for classification: 1) Fewer number of games played (GP, only during regular season); 2) Greater number of regulation wins (RW); 3) Greater number of wins in regulation and overtime, excluding shootout wins (ROW); 4) Greater number of total wins, including shootouts (W); 5) Greater number of points earned in head-to-head play; if teams played an uneven number of head-to-head games, the result of the first game on the home ice of the team with the extra home game is discarded; 6) Greater goal differential (GD); 7) Greater number of goals scored (GF)
p – Clinched Presidents' Trophy; x – Clinched playoff spot

=== Conference standings ===
Western Conference Wild Card
Pos	Div	Team	GP	W	L	OTL	RW	GF	GA	GD	Pts
1	CE	x – Minnesota Wild	82	45	30	7	33	228	239	−11	97
2	CE	x – St. Louis Blues	82	44	30	8	32	254	233	+21	96
3	PA	Calgary Flames	82	41	27	14	31	225	238	−13	96
4	PA	Vancouver Canucks	82	38	30	14	28	236	253	−17	90
5	CE	Utah Hockey Club	82	38	31	13	30	241	251	−10	89
6	PA	Anaheim Ducks	82	35	37	10	24	221	263	−42	80
7	PA	Seattle Kraken	82	35	41	6	28	247	265	−18	76
8	CE	Nashville Predators	82	30	44	8	24	214	274	−60	68
9	CE	Chicago Blackhawks	82	25	46	11	20	226	296	−70	61
10	PA	San Jose Sharks	82	20	50	12	14	210	315	−105	52

Source: National Hockey League
Rules for classification: 1) Fewer number of games played (GP, only during regular season); 2) Greater number of regulation wins (RW); 3) Greater number of wins in regulation and overtime, excluding shootout wins (ROW); 4) Greater number of total wins, including shootouts (W); 5) Greater number of points earned in head-to-head play; if teams played an uneven number of head-to-head games, the result of the first game on the home ice of the team with the extra home game is discarded; 6) Greater goal differential (GD); 7) Greater number of goals scored (GF)
x – Clinched playoff spot

== Schedule and results ==
=== Preseason ===
The preseason schedule was released on June 25, 2024.

2024–25 game log

October: 2–3–0 (home: 1–1–0; road: 1–2–0)
#	Date	Visitor	Score	Home	OT	Decision	Location	Attendance	Record	Recap
1	September 22^{A}	Nashville	2–3	Florida		Haider	Amerant Bank Arena	8,076	0–1–0
2	September 22^{A}	Nashville	2–6	Florida		Wedgewood	Amerant Bank Arena	8,076	0–2–0
–	September 27	Nashville	–	Tampa Bay	Game postponed due to the impending threat from Hurricane Helene.
3	September 28	Tampa Bay	0–6	Nashville		Saros	Bridgestone Arena	17,159	1–2–0
4	October 2	Nashville	6–4	Carolina		Wedgewood	Lenovo Center	18,700	2–2–0
5	October 5	Carolina	5–3	Nashville		Wedgewood	Bridgestone Arena	17,159	2–3–0
–	October 7	Nashville	–	Tampa Bay	Game cancelled due to the impending threat from Hurricane Milton.

Notes:
^{A} Indicates split-squad.

=== Regular season ===
The regular season schedule was announced on July 2, 2024

2024–25 game log

October: 3–6–1 (home: 2–5–0; road: 1–1–1)
#	Date	Visitor	Score	Home	OT	Decision	Location	Attendance	Record	Pts	Recap
1	October 10	Dallas	4–3	Nashville		Wedgewood	Bridgestone Arena	17,544	0–1–0	0
2	October 12	Nashville	0–3	Detroit		Saros	Little Caesars Arena	19,515	0–2–0	0
3	October 15	Seattle	7–3	Nashville		Saros	Bridgestone Arena	17,159	0–3–0	0
4	October 17	Edmonton	4–2	Nashville		Saros	Bridgestone Arena	17,159	0–4–0	0
5	October 19	Detroit	5–2	Nashville		Saros	Bridgestone Arena	17,159	0–5–0	0
6	October 22	Boston	0–4	Nashville		Saros	Bridgestone Arena	17,184	1–5–0	2
7	October 25	Nashville	3–2	Chicago		Saros	United Center	17,787	2–5–0	4
8	October 26	Columbus	3–4	Nashville	OT	Wedgewood	Bridgestone Arena	17,159	3–5–0	6
9	October 28	Nashville	2–3	Tampa Bay	OT	Saros	Amalie Arena	19,092	3–5–1	7
10	October 31	Edmonton	5–1	Nashville		Saros	Bridgestone Arena	17,159	3–6–1	7

November: 4–6–5 (home: 3–1–2; road: 1–5–3)
#	Date	Visitor	Score	Home	OT	Decision	Location	Attendance	Record	Pts	Recap
11	November 2	Colorado	2–5	Nashville		Saros	Bridgestone Arena	17,213	4–6–1	9
12	November 4	Los Angeles	3–0	Nashville		Saros	Bridgestone Arena	17,168	4–7–1	9
13	November 6	Nashville	2–3	Washington		Saros	Capital One Arena	17,177	4–8–1	9
14	November 7	Nashville	2–6	Florida		Wedgewood	Amerant Bank Arena	18,264	4–9–1	9
15	November 9	Utah	0–4	Nashville		Saros	Bridgestone Arena	17,159	5–9–1	11
16	November 11	Nashville	2–3	Colorado	OT	Saros	Ball Arena	18,016	5–9–2	12
17	November 14	Nashville	2–3	Edmonton	OT	Wedgewood	Rogers Place	18,347	5–9–3	13
18	November 15	Nashville	0–2	Calgary		Saros	Scotiabank Saddledome	17,900	5–10–3	13
19	November 17	Nashville	5–3	Vancouver		Saros	Rogers Arena	18,587	6–10–3	15
20	November 20	Nashville	0–3	Seattle		Saros	Climate Pledge Arena	17,151	6–11–3	15
21	November 23	Winnipeg	1–4	Nashville		Saros	Bridgestone Arena	17,159	7–11–3	17
22	November 25	Nashville	2–5	New Jersey		Saros	Prudential Center	16,514	7–12–3	17
23	November 27	Philadelphia	3–2	Nashville	OT	Saros	Bridgestone Arena	17,159	7–12–4	18
24	November 29	Tampa Bay	3–2	Nashville	OT	Saros	Bridgestone Arena	18,228	7–12–5	19
25	November 30	Nashville	2–3	Minnesota	OT	Saros	Xcel Energy Center	19,064	7–12–6	20

December: 4–8–1 (home: 3–1–1; road: 1–7–0)
#	Date	Visitor	Score	Home	OT	Decision	Location	Attendance	Record	Pts	Recap
26	December 4	Nashville	2–3	Toronto		Saros	Scotiabank Arena	18,611	7–13–6	20
27	December 5	Nashville	0–3	Montreal		Annunen	Bell Centre	21,105	7–14–6	20
28	December 7	Nashville	1–3	Ottawa		Saros	Canadian Tire Centre	16,741	7–15–6	20
29	December 10	Calgary	4–3	Nashville		Saros	Bridgestone Arena	17,159	7–16–6	20
30	December 12	Nashville	4–1	Dallas		Annunen	American Airlines Center	18,532	8–16–6	22
31	December 14	Nashville	2–5	Colorado		Saros	Ball Arena	18,049	8–17–6	22
32	December 17	NY Rangers	0–2	Nashville		Saros	Bridgestone Arena	17,159	9–17–6	24
33	December 19	Pittsburgh	5–4	Nashville	OT	Saros	Bridgestone Arena	17,159	9–17–7	25
34	December 21	Los Angeles	2–3	Nashville	OT	Annunen	Bridgestone Arena	17,159	10–17–7	27
35	December 23	Carolina	2–5	Nashville		Saros	Bridgestone Arena	17,159	11–17–7	29
36	December 27	Nashville	4–7	St. Louis		Saros	Enterprise Center	18,096	11–18–7	29
37	December 30	Nashville	0–3	Winnipeg		Saros	Canada Life Centre	15,225	11–19–7	29
38	December 31	Nashville	3–5	Minnesota		Annunen	Xcel Energy Center	19,145	11–20–7	29

January: 7–5–0 (home: 4–2–0; road: 3–3–0)
#	Date	Visitor	Score	Home	OT	Decision	Location	Attendance	Record	Pts	Recap
39	January 3	Nashville	3–0	Vancouver		Saros	Rogers Arena	18,894	12–20–7	31
40	January 4	Nashville	4–1	Calgary		Annunen	Scotiabank Saddledome	17,893	13–20–7	33
41	January 7	Nashville	2–5	Winnipeg		Saros	Canada Life Centre	13,105	13–21–7	33
42	January 11	Washington	4–1	Nashville		Saros	Bridgestone Arena	17,159	13–22–7	33
43	January 14	Vegas	3–5	Nashville		Annunen	Bridgestone Arena	17,159	14–22–7	35
44	January 16	Chicago	2–3	Nashville	SO	Saros	Bridgestone Arena	17,159	15–22–7	37
45	January 18	Minnesota	2–6	Nashville		Saros	Bridgestone Arena	17,615	16–22–7	39
46	January 21	San Jose	5–7	Nashville		Annunen	Bridgestone Arena	17,159	17–22–7	41
47	January 23	Nashville	6–5	San Jose		Annunen	SAP Center	11,292	18–22–7	43
48	January 25	Nashville	2–5	Anaheim		Saros	Honda Center	15,748	18–23–7	43
49	January 29	Vancouver	3–1	Nashville		Saros	Bridgestone Arena	17,159	18–24–7	43
50	January 31	Nashville	3–4	Buffalo		Annunen	KeyBank Center	18,347	18–25–7	43

February: 3–5–0 (home: 3–3–0; road: 0–2–0)
#	Date	Visitor	Score	Home	OT	Decision	Location	Attendance	Record	Pts	Recap
51	February 1	Nashville	0–3	Pittsburgh		Saros	PPG Paints Arena	18,272	18–26–7	43
52	February 3	Ottawa	5–2	Nashville		Saros	Bridgestone Arena	17,159	18–27–7	43
53	February 7	Nashville	2–6	Chicago		Saros	United Center	19,347	18–28–7	43
54	February 8	Buffalo	4–6	Nashville		Annunen	Bridgestone Arena	17,159	19–28–7	45
55	February 22	Colorado	1–2	Nashville		Saros	Bridgestone Arena	17,159	20–28–7	47
56	February 23	New Jersey	5–0	Nashville		Annunen	Bridgestone Arena	17,159	20–29–7	47
57	February 25	Florida	4–1	Nashville		Saros	Bridgestone Arena	17,159	20–30–7	47
58	February 27	Winnipeg	1–2	Nashville		Saros	Bridgestone Arena	17,159	21–30–7	49

March: 6–9–1 (home: 3–4–0; road: 3–5–1)
#	Date	Visitor	Score	Home	OT	Decision	Location	Attendance	Record	Pts	Recap
59	March 1	Nashville	4–7	NY Islanders		Saros	UBS Arena	17,255	21–31–7	49
60	March 2	Nashville	0–4	NY Rangers		Annunen	Madison Square Garden	17,336	21–32–7	49
61	March 4	Nashville	6–3	Boston		Saros	TD Garden	17,850	22–32–7	51
62	March 6	Seattle	3–5	Nashville		Saros	Bridgestone Arena	17,159	23–32–7	53
63	March 8	Chicago	2–3	Nashville	OT	Annunen	Bridgestone Arena	17,159	24–32–7	55
64	March 11	Nashville	3–2	San Jose		Saros	SAP Center	10,523	25–32–7	57
65	March 14	Nashville	1–2	Anaheim		Saros	Honda Center	14,758	25–33–7	57
66	March 15	Nashville	0–1	Los Angeles	OT	Annunen	Crypto.com Arena	18,145	25–33–8	58
67	March 18	St. Louis	4–1	Nashville		Saros	Bridgestone Arena	17,159	25–34–8	58
68	March 20	Anaheim	4–1	Nashville		Annunen	Bridgestone Arena	17,159	25–35–8	58
69	March 22	Toronto	2–5	Nashville		Saros	Bridgestone Arena	17,159	26–35–8	60
70	March 23	Nashville	1–4	St. Louis		Annunen	Enterprise Center	18,096	26–36–8	60
71	March 25	Nashville	3–1	Carolina		Saros	Lenovo Center	18,700	27–36–8	62
72	March 27	St. Louis	3–2	Nashville		Saros	Bridgestone Arena	17,159	27–37–8	62
73	March 29	Vegas	3–1	Nashville		Annunen	Bridgestone Arena	17,159	27–38–8	62
74	March 31	Nashville	1–2	Philadelphia		Annunen	Wells Fargo Center	18,858	27–39–8	62

April: 3–5–0 (home: 2–2–0; road: 1–3–0)
#	Date	Visitor	Score	Home	OT	Decision	Location	Attendance	Record	Pts	Recap
75	April 1	Nashville	4–8	Columbus		Saros	Nationwide Arena	15,605	27–40–8	62
76	April 3	Nashville	1–5	Dallas		Annunen	American Airlines Center	18,532	27–41–8	62
77	April 6	Montreal	2–1	Nashville		Saros	Bridgestone Arena	17,183	27–42–8	62
78	April 8	NY Islanders	6–7	Nashville	OT	Annunen	Bridgestone Arena	17,159	28–42–8	64
79	April 10	Nashville	4–3	Utah	SO	Saros	Delta Center	11,131	29–42–8	66
80	April 12	Nashville	3–5	Vegas		Annunen	T-Mobile Arena	18,338	29–43–8	66
81	April 14	Utah	7–3	Nashville		Saros	Bridgestone Arena	17,159	29–44–8	66
82	April 16	Dallas	1–5	Nashville		Saros	Bridgestone Arena	17,330	30–44–8	68

Legend: Win (2 points) Loss (0 points) Overtime/shootout loss (1 point)

== Player statistics ==
Updated to game played April 12, 2025

=== Skaters ===
Regular season
Player	GP	G	A	Pts	+/−	PIM
Filip Forsberg	82	31	42	73	−26	44
Jonathan Marchessault	78	21	35	56	−29	35
Ryan O'Reilly	77	19	29	48	−22	24
Roman Josi	53	9	29	38	−26	18
Steven Stamkos	82	27	26	53	−35	48
Tommy Novak^{‡}	52	13	9	22	−5	4
Gustav Nyquist^{‡}	57	9	12	21	−20	12
Brady Skjei	82	10	23	33	−20	38
Colton Sissons	72	7	14	21	−12	22
Luke Evangelista	66	9	21	30	−3	22
Zachary L'Heureux	60	5	10	15	−5	59
Cole Smith	69	4	8	12	−14	69
Fedor Svechkov	50	8	8	16	−17	14
Mark Jankowski^{‡}	40	4	5	9	+1	15
Michael McCarron	72	5	9	14	−20	100
Nick Blankenburg	58	4	12	16	+2	22
Justin Barron^{†}	24	3	4	7	−10	8
Alexandre Carrier^{‡}	28	1	6	7	−14	12
Juuso Parssinen^{‡}	15	2	3	5	−8	0
Adam Wilsby	23	1	4	5	+3	6
Marc Del Gaizo	44	2	7	9	−4	21
Luke Schenn^{‡}	61	1	4	5	−9	41
Vinnie Hinostroza	13	0	2	2	0	6
Kevin Gravel	6	0	1	1	+3	0
Philip Tomasino^{‡}	11	0	1	1	0	0
Jeremy Lauzon	28	0	1	1	−4	37
Joakim Kemell	2	0	0	0	0	0
Jake Lucchini	2	0	0	0	−3	0
Ozzy Wiesblatt	3	0	0	0	+1	0
Kieffer Bellows	5	0	0	0	−3	2
Dante Fabbro	6	0	0	0	−3	0
Andreas Englund^{†}	7	0	0	0	−5	19
Spencer Stastney	9	0	0	0	−5	0

=== Goaltenders ===
Regular season
Player	GP	GS	TOI	W	L	OT	GA	GAA	SA	SV%	SO	G	A	PIM
Juuse Saros	56	56	2,658:40	19	30	6	160	2.96	1,527	.898	4	0	1	4
Justus Annunen^{†}	23	20	713:28	9	11	1	67	3.17	596	.898	0	0	0	0
Scott Wedgewood^{‡}	5	4	260:01	1	2	1	16	3.69	131	.878	0	0	0	0

^{†}Denotes player spent time with another team before joining the Predators. Stats reflect time with the Predators only.
^{‡}Denotes player was traded mid-season. Stats reflect time with the Predators only.
Bold/italics denotes franchise record.

== Transactions ==
The Predators have been involved in the following transactions during the 2024–25 season.

Key: † Contract is entry-level.
‡ Contract initially takes effect in the 2025–26 season.

=== Trades ===
Date	Details		Ref
August 13, 2024	To Pittsburgh Penguins Cody Glass; MIN 3rd-round pick in 2025; 6th-round pick in 2026	To Nashville Predators Jordan Frasca	
August 23, 2024	To San Jose Sharks Yaroslav Askarov; Nolan Burke; COL 3rd-round pick in 2025	To Nashville Predators Magnus Chrona; David Edstrom conditional SJS 1st-round pick in 2025 or VGK 1st-round pick in 2025^{1}	
November 25, 2024	To Pittsburgh Penguins Philip Tomasino	To Nashville Predators NYR 4th-round pick in 2027	
November 27, 2024	To Chicago Blackhawks Future considerations	To Nashville Predators Ryder Rolston	
November 30, 2024	To Colorado Avalanche Scott Wedgewood	To Nashville Predators Justus Annunen; 6th-round pick in 2025	
December 18, 2024	To Montreal Canadiens Alexandre Carrier	To Nashville Predators Justin Barron	
December 28, 2024	To Colorado Avalanche Juuso Parssinen; NYR 7th-round pick in 2026	To Nashville Predators Ondrej Pavel; 3rd-round pick in 2027	
February 7, 2025	To Vancouver Canucks Future considerations	To Nashville Predators Mark Friedman	
February 26, 2025	To Tampa Bay Lightning Anthony Angello	To Nashville Predators Jesse Ylonen	
March 1, 2025	To Minnesota Wild Gustav Nyquist^{2}	To Nashville Predators 2nd-round pick in 2026	
March 5, 2025	To Pittsburgh Penguins Tommy Novak; Luke Schenn	To Nashville Predators Michael Bunting; 4th-round pick in 2026	

Notes

1. If Vegas' first-round pick falls within the top 10, San Jose has the right to transfer either its first-round pick or Vegas' first-round pick to Nashville.
2. Nashville retains 50% of Nyqvist's remaining contract.

=== Players acquired ===
Date	Player	Former team	Term	Via	Ref
July 1, 2024	Nick Blankenburg	Columbus Blue Jackets	2-year	Free agency	
July 1, 2024	Vinnie Hinostroza	Pittsburgh Penguins	2-year	Free agency	
July 1, 2024	Jake Lucchini	Minnesota Wild	2-year	Free agency	
July 1, 2024	Jonathan Marchessault	Vegas Golden Knights	5-year	Free agency	
July 1, 2024	Matt Murray	Dallas Stars	1-year	Free agency	
July 1, 2024	Brady Skjei	Carolina Hurricanes	7-year	Free agency	
July 1, 2024	Steven Stamkos	Tampa Bay Lightning	4-year	Free agency	
July 1, 2024	Scott Wedgewood	Dallas Stars	2-year	Free agency	
July 3, 2024	Kieffer Bellows	Toronto Marlies (AHL)	1-year	Free agency	

=== Players lost ===
Date	Player	New team	Term	Via	Ref
July 1, 2024	Anthony Beauvillier	Pittsburgh Penguins	1-year	Free agency	
July 1, 2024	Troy Grosenick	Minnesota Wild	1-year	Free agency	
July 1, 2024	Jimmy Huntington	Pittsburgh Penguins	1-year	Free agency	
July 1, 2024	Kiefer Sherwood	Vancouver Canucks	2-year	Free agency	
July 1, 2024	Jason Zucker	Buffalo Sabres	1-year	Free agency	
July 2, 2024	Jaret Anderson-Dolan	Winnipeg Jets	2-year	Free agency	
July 10, 2024	Liam Foudy	New York Islanders	1-year	Free agency	
September 21, 2024	Kevin Lankinen	Vancouver Canucks	1-year	Free agency	
October 3, 2024	Tyson Barrie	Calgary Flames	1-year	Free agency	
November 10, 2024	Dante Fabbro	Columbus Blue Jackets		Waivers	
February 5, 2025	Vinnie Hinostroza	Minnesota Wild		Waivers	

=== Signings ===
Date	Player	Term	Ref
July 1, 2024	Alexandre Carrier	3-year	
July 1, 2024	Juuse Saros	8-year‡	
July 18, 2024	Adam Wilsby	1-year	
July 25, 2024	Spencer Stastney	2-year	

== Draft picks ==
Below are the Nashville Predators' selections at the 2024 NHL entry draft, which was held on June 28 to 29, 2024, at Sphere in Paradise, Nevada.

Round	#	Player	Pos.	Nationality	Team (League)
1	22	Yegor Surin	C	Russia	Loko Yaroslavl (MHL)
2	55	Teddy Stiga	C	United States	U.S. NTDP (USHL)
3	77	Viggo Gustafsson	D	Sweden	HV71 (J20 Nationell)
3	87	Miguel Marques	RW	Canada	Lethbridge Hurricanes (WHL)
3	94	Hiroki Gojsic	RW	Canada	Kelowna Rockets (WHL)
4	99	Jakub Milota	G	Czech Republic	Cape Breton Eagles (QMJHL)
4	127	Victor Norringer	LW	Sweden	Frölunda HC (J20 Nationell)
7	213	Erik Pahlsson	C	Sweden	Dubuque Fighting Saints (USHL)
