= 2024–25 Los Angeles Kings season =

National Hockey League season

2024–25 Los Angeles Kings
- Division: 2nd Pacific
- Conference: 4th Western
- 2024–25 record: 48–25–9
- Home record: 31–6–4
- Road record: 17–19–5
- Goals for: 250
- Goals against: 206

Team information
- General manager: Rob Blake
- Coach: Jim Hiller
- Captain: Anze Kopitar
- Alternate captains: Phillip Danault; Drew Doughty
- Arena: Crypto.com Arena
- Average attendance: 17,196
- Minor league affiliates: Ontario Reign (AHL); Greenville Swamp Rabbits (ECHL)

Team leaders
- Goals: Kevin Fiala (35)
- Assists: Anze Kopitar (46)
- Points: Adrian Kempe (71)
- Penalty minutes: Tanner Jeannot (89)
- Plus/minus: Warren Foegele (+34)
- Wins: Darcy Kuemper (31)
- Goals against average: Erik Portillo (1.02)

The 2024–25 Los Angeles Kings season was their 58th season for the National Hockey League (NHL) franchise that was established on June 5, 1967.

On April 5, 2025, the Kings clinched a playoff berth for the fourth consecutive season after a 3–0 win against the rival Edmonton Oilers and the Calgary Flames overtime loss to the Vegas Golden Knights.

On May 1, 2025, the Kings were eliminated from the first round of the playoffs for the fourth straight year after losing to the Edmonton Oilers in six games after initially taking the first two games before dropping four straight games to end their season.

== Off-season ==
=== Rebrand ===
During the 2024 offseason, the Los Angeles Kings underwent a major rebrand. After promoting their new logo on June 20, the Kings released their new logo and jerseys on June 26. The new logo was heavily influenced by the Wayne Gretzky era branding, but the logo was modernized from purple and yellow to "enhanced silver" under the new theme: "Legacy Moves Us Forward." The jerseys were unveiled that same day with the silver font on the home jersey replaced by white and the away jersey's color font was updated to black.

== Standings ==
=== Divisional standings ===
Pacific Division
Pos	Team	GP	W	L	OTL	RW	GF	GA	GD	Pts
1	y – Vegas Golden Knights	82	50	22	10	46	275	219	+56	110
2	x – Los Angeles Kings	82	48	25	9	43	250	206	+44	105
3	x – Edmonton Oilers	82	48	29	5	36	259	236	+23	101
4	Calgary Flames	82	41	27	14	31	225	238	−13	96
5	Vancouver Canucks	82	38	30	14	28	236	253	−17	90
6	Anaheim Ducks	82	35	37	10	24	221	263	−42	80
7	Seattle Kraken	82	35	41	6	28	247	265	−18	76
8	San Jose Sharks	82	20	50	12	14	210	315	−105	52

Source: National Hockey League
Rules for classification: 1) Fewer number of games played (GP, only during regular season); 2) Greater number of regulation wins (RW); 3) Greater number of wins in regulation and overtime, excluding shootout wins (ROW); 4) Greater number of total wins, including shootouts (W); 5) Greater number of points earned in head-to-head play; if teams played an uneven number of head-to-head games, the result of the first game on the home ice of the team with the extra home game is discarded; 6) Greater goal differential (GD); 7) Greater number of goals scored (GF)
x – Clinched playoff spot; y – Clinched division

=== Conference standings ===
Western Conference Wild Card
Pos	Div	Team	GP	W	L	OTL	RW	GF	GA	GD	Pts
1	CE	x – Minnesota Wild	82	45	30	7	33	228	239	−11	97
2	CE	x – St. Louis Blues	82	44	30	8	32	254	233	+21	96
3	PA	Calgary Flames	82	41	27	14	31	225	238	−13	96
4	PA	Vancouver Canucks	82	38	30	14	28	236	253	−17	90
5	CE	Utah Hockey Club	82	38	31	13	30	241	251	−10	89
6	PA	Anaheim Ducks	82	35	37	10	24	221	263	−42	80
7	PA	Seattle Kraken	82	35	41	6	28	247	265	−18	76
8	CE	Nashville Predators	82	30	44	8	24	214	274	−60	68
9	CE	Chicago Blackhawks	82	25	46	11	20	226	296	−70	61
10	PA	San Jose Sharks	82	20	50	12	14	210	315	−105	52

Source: National Hockey League
Rules for classification: 1) Fewer number of games played (GP, only during regular season); 2) Greater number of regulation wins (RW); 3) Greater number of wins in regulation and overtime, excluding shootout wins (ROW); 4) Greater number of total wins, including shootouts (W); 5) Greater number of points earned in head-to-head play; if teams played an uneven number of head-to-head games, the result of the first game on the home ice of the team with the extra home game is discarded; 6) Greater goal differential (GD); 7) Greater number of goals scored (GF)
x – Clinched playoff spot

== Schedule and results ==
=== Preseason ===
The preseason schedule was published on June 21, 2024. Due to ongoing renovations at Crypto.com Arena, the Kings did not play preseason home games at the arena. The final two preseason games were played in Quebec City.

2024 preseason game log: 4–1–1 (Home: 2–1–0; Road: 2–0–1)

#	Date	Visitor	Score	Home	OT	Decision	Location	Attendance	Record	Recap
1	September 23	Los Angeles	2–3	Utah	OT	George	Delta Center	11,131	0–0–1	
2	September 25	Los Angeles	3–2	Vegas		Kuemper	T-Mobile Arena	17,488	1–0–1	
3	September 28	Anaheim	2–3	Los Angeles		Rittich	Toyota Arena	9,631	2–0–1	
4	September 30	Los Angeles	4–0	Anaheim		Kuemper	Honda Center	10,574	3–0–1	
5	October 3	Boston	1–4	Los Angeles		Rittich	Videotron Centre	17,334	4–0–1	
6	October 5	Florida	4–2	Los Angeles		Kuemper	Videotron Centre	17,320	4–1–1	

Legend:

Win Loss OT/SO Loss

=== Regular season ===
The regular season schedule was released on July 2, 2024.

2024–25 game log
October: 6–3–2 (Home: 3–0–0; Road: 3–3–2)

#	Date	Visitor	Score	Home	OT	Decision	Location	Attendance	Record	Points	Recap
1	October 10	Los Angeles	3–1	Buffalo		Kuemper	KeyBank Center	19,070	1–0–0	2	
2	October 12	Los Angeles	1–2	Boston	OT	Kuemper	TD Garden	17,850	1–0–1	3	
3	October 14	Los Angeles	7–8	Ottawa	OT	Kuemper	Canadian Tire Centre	16,788	1–0–2	4	
4	October 16	Los Angeles	2–6	Toronto		Rittich	Scotiabank Arena	18,852	1–1–2	4	
5	October 17	Los Angeles	4–1	Montreal		Rittich	Bell Centre	21,105	2–1–2	6	
6	October 20	Los Angeles	4–1	Anaheim		Rittich	Honda Center	16,098	3–1–2	8	
7	October 22	Los Angeles	1–6	Vegas		Rittich	T-Mobile Arena	17,767	3–2–2	8	
8	October 24	San Jose	2–3	Los Angeles		Rittich	Crypto.com Arena	18,146	4–2–2	10	
9	October 26	Utah	2–3	Los Angeles		Kuemper	Crypto.com Arena	15,116	5–2–2	12	
10	October 29	Los Angeles	2–4	San Jose		Rittich	SAP Center	10,818	5–3–2	12	
11	October 30	Vegas	3–6	Los Angeles		Kuemper	Crypto.com Arena	15,007	6–3–2	14	

November: 8–5–1 (Home: 5–2–1; Road: 3–3–0)

#	Date	Visitor	Score	Home	OT	Decision	Location	Attendance	Record	Points	Recap
12	November 2	Chicago	4–3	Los Angeles	SO	Kuemper	Crypto.com Arena	17,314	6–3–3	15	
13	November 4	Los Angeles	3–0	Nashville		Kuemper	Bridgestone Arena	17,168	7–3–3	17	
14	November 5	Los Angeles	5–1	Minnesota		Rittich	Xcel Energy Center	17,617	8–3–3	19	
15	November 7	Vancouver	4–2	Los Angeles		Kuemper	Crypto.com Arena	17,855	8–4–3	19	
16	November 9	Columbus	2–5	Los Angeles		Rittich	Crypto.com Arena	18,145	9–4–3	21	
17	November 11	Los Angeles	1–3	Calgary		Kuemper	Scotiabank Saddledome	16,920	9–5–3	21	
18	November 13	Los Angeles	2–4	Colorado		Rittich	Ball Arena	18,059	9–6–3	21	
19	November 16	Detroit	1–4	Los Angeles		Rittich	Crypto.com Arena	18,145	10–6–3	23	
20	November 20	Buffalo	1–0	Los Angeles		Rittich	Crypto.com Arena	16,778	10–7–3	23	
21	November 23	Seattle	1–2	Los Angeles		Rittich	Crypto.com Arena	18,145	11–7–3	25	
22	November 25	Los Angeles	2–7	San Jose		Rittich	SAP Center	10,713	11–8–3	25	
23	November 27	Winnipeg	1–4	Los Angeles		Rittich	Crypto.com Arena	17,395	12–8–3	27	
24	November 29	Los Angeles	2–1	Anaheim		Portillo	Honda Center	17,174	13–8–3	29	
25	November 30	Ottawa	2–5	Los Angeles		Rittich	Crypto.com Arena	16,808	14–8–3	31	

December: 7–2–2 (Home: 4–0–0; Road: 3–2–2)

#	Date	Visitor	Score	Home	OT	Decision	Location	Attendance	Record	Points	Recap
26	December 4	Dallas	2–3	Los Angeles		Rittich	Crypto.com Arena	15,010	15–8–3	33	
27	December 7	Minnesota	1–4	Los Angeles		Kuemper	Crypto.com Arena	18,145	16–8–3	35	
28	December 10	Los Angeles	3–1	NY Islanders		Kuemper	UBS Arena	15,402	17–8–3	37	
29	December 12	Los Angeles	1–3	New Jersey		Rittich	Prudential Center	15,051	17–9–3	37	
30	December 14	Los Angeles	5–1	NY Rangers		Kuemper	Madison Square Garden	18,006	18–9–3	39	
31	December 17	Los Angeles	2–3	Pittsburgh	OT	Kuemper	PPG Paints Arena	15,011	18–9–4	40	
32	December 19	Los Angeles	7–3	Philadelphia		Kuemper	Wells Fargo Center	18,551	19–9–4	42	
33	December 21	Los Angeles	2–3	Nashville	OT	Kuemper	Bridgestone Arena	17,159	19–9–5	43	
34	December 22	Los Angeles	1–3	Washington		Rittich	Capital One Arena	18,573	19–10–5	43	
35	December 28	Edmonton	3–4	Los Angeles	OT	Kuemper	Crypto.com Arena	18,145	20–10–5	45	
36	December 29	Philadelphia	4–5	Los Angeles		Rittich	Crypto.com Arena	18,145	21–10–5	47	

January: 5–7–1 (Home: 3–1–0; Road: 2–6–1)

#	Date	Visitor	Score	Home	OT	Decision	Location	Attendance	Record	Points	Recap
37	January 1	New Jersey	0–3	Los Angeles		Kuemper	Crypto.com Arena	18,145	22–10–5	49	
38	January 4	Tampa Bay	1–2	Los Angeles		Kuemper	Crypto.com Arena	18,145	23–10–5	51	
—	January 8	Calgary		Los Angeles	Game postponed due to the January 2025 Southern California wildfires. Makeup date: April 17						
39	January 10	Los Angeles	2–1	Winnipeg	OT	Kuemper	Canada Life Centre	14,218	24–10–5	53	
40	January 11	Los Angeles	1–2	Calgary		Rittich	Scotiabank Saddledome	18,446	24–11–5	53	
41	January 13	Los Angeles	0–1	Edmonton		Kuemper	Rogers Place	18,347	24–12–5	53	
42	January 16	Los Angeles	5–1	Vancouver		Kuemper	Rogers Arena	18,913	25–12–5	55	
43	January 18	Los Angeles	2–4	Seattle		Kuemper	Climate Pledge Arena	17,151	25–13–5	55	
44	January 20	Pittsburgh	5–1	Los Angeles		Rittich	Crypto.com Arena	18,145	25–14–5	55	
45	January 22	Florida	1–2	Los Angeles		Kuemper	Crypto.com Arena	15,090	26–14–5	57	
46	January 25	Los Angeles	2–3	Columbus	OT	Kuemper	Nationwide Arena	18,919	26–14–6	58	
47	January 27	Los Angeles	2–5	Detroit		Kuemper	Little Caesars Arena	17,450	26–15–6	58	
48	January 29	Los Angeles	0–3	Florida		Kuemper	Amerant Bank Arena	19,515	26–16–6	58	
49	January 30	Los Angeles	0–3	Tampa Bay		Rittich	Amalie Arena	19,092	26–17–6	58	

February: 5–1–2 (Home: 4–0–2; Road: 1–1–0)

#	Date	Visitor	Score	Home	OT	Decision	Location	Attendance	Record	Points	Recap
50	February 1	Los Angeles	4–2	Carolina		Kuemper	Lenovo Center	18,977	27–17–6	60	
51	February 5	Montreal	3–6	Los Angeles		Kuemper	Crypto.com Arena	15,584	28–17–6	62	
52	February 7	Dallas	4–5	Los Angeles	SO	Rittich	Crypto.com Arena	18,145	29–17–6	64	
53	February 8	Anaheim	2–1	Los Angeles	SO	Rittich	Crypto.com Arena	18,145	29–17–7	65	
54	February 22	Utah	3–5	Los Angeles		Kuemper	Crypto.com Arena	18,145	30–17–7	67	
55	February 24	Vegas	2–5	Los Angeles		Kuemper	Crypto.com Arena	18,145	31–17–7	69	
56	February 26	Vancouver	3–2	Los Angeles	OT	Rittich	Crypto.com Arena	15,470	31–17–8	70	
57	February 28	Los Angeles	2–6	Dallas		Kuemper	American Airlines Center	18,532	31–18–8	70	

March: 10–5–1 (Home: 8–1–1; Road: 2–4–0)

#	Date	Visitor	Score	Home	OT	Decision	Location	Attendance	Record	Points	Recap
58	March 1	Los Angeles	1–4	St. Louis		Rittich	Enterprise Center	17,713	31–19–8	70	
59	March 3	Los Angeles	1–5	Chicago		Kuemper	United Center	16,254	31–20–8	70	
60	March 5	St. Louis	3–2	Los Angeles	SO	Kuemper	Crypto.com Arena	14,055	31–20–9	71	
61	March 8	St. Louis	1–2	Los Angeles	OT	Kuemper	Crypto.com Arena	17,796	32–20–9	73	
62	March 9	Los Angeles	6–5	Vegas		Rittich	T-Mobile Arena	18,019	33–20–9	75	
63	March 11	NY Islanders	1–4	Los Angeles		Kuemper	Crypto.com Arena	15,394	34–20–9	77	
64	March 13	Washington	0–3	Los Angeles		Kuemper	Crypto.com Arena	18,145	35–20–9	79	
65	March 15	Nashville	0–1	Los Angeles	OT	Kuemper	Crypto.com Arena	18,145	36–20–9	81	
66	March 17	Los Angeles	1–3	Minnesota		Kuemper	Xcel Energy Center	18,033	36–21–9	81	
67	March 20	Los Angeles	3–1	Chicago		Kuemper	United Center	16,981	37–21–9	83	
68	March 22	Carolina	2–7	Los Angeles		Rittich	Crypto.com Arena	16,896	38–21–9	85	
69	March 23	Boston	2–7	Los Angeles		Kuemper	Crypto.com Arena	18,145	39–21–9	87	
70	March 25	NY Rangers	1–3	Los Angeles		Kuemper	Crypto.com Arena	17,022	40–21–9	89	
71	March 27	Los Angeles	0–4	Colorado		Rittich	Ball Arena	18,087	40–22–9	89	
72	March 29	Toronto	3–1	Los Angeles		Kuemper	Crypto.com Arena	18,145	40–23–9	89	
73	March 30	San Jose	1–8	Los Angeles		Rittich	Crypto.com Arena	18,145	41–23–9	91	

April: 7–2–0 (Home: 4–2–0; Road: 3–0–0)

#	Date	Visitor	Score	Home	OT	Decision	Location	Attendance	Record	Points	Recap
74	April 1	Winnipeg	1–4	Los Angeles		Kuemper	Crypto.com Arena	15,012	42–23–9	93	
75	April 3	Los Angeles	4–2	Utah		Kuemper	Delta Center	11,131	43–23–9	95	
76	April 5	Edmonton	0–3	Los Angeles		Kuemper	Crypto.com Arena	16,366	44–23–9	97	
77	April 7	Seattle	2–1	Los Angeles		Kuemper	Crypto.com Arena	16,655	44–24–9	97	
78	April 10	Anaheim	1–6	Los Angeles		Kuemper	Crypto.com Arena	18,145	45–24–9	99	
79	April 12	Colorado	4–5	Los Angeles		Kuemper	Crypto.com Arena	17,355	46–24–9	101	
80	April 14	Los Angeles	5–0	Edmonton		Kuemper	Rogers Place	18,347	47–24–9	103	
81	April 15	Los Angeles	6–5	Seattle		Rittich	Climate Pledge Arena	17,151	48–24–9	105	
82	April 17	Calgary	5–1	Los Angeles		Rittich	Crypto.com Arena	18,145	48–25–9	105	

Legend:

Win Loss OT/SO Loss

=== Playoffs ===
2025 Stanley Cup playoffs
Western Conference first round vs. (P3) Edmonton Oilers: Edmonton won 4–2

#	Date	Visitor	Score	Home	OT	Decision	Attendance	Series	Recap
1	April 21	Edmonton	5–6	Los Angeles		Kuemper	18,145	1–0	
2	April 23	Edmonton	2–6	Los Angeles		Kuemper	18,145	2–0	
3	April 25	Los Angeles	4–7	Edmonton		Kuemper	18,347	2–1	
4	April 27	Los Angeles	3–4	Edmonton	OT	Kuemper	18,347	2–2	
5	April 29	Edmonton	3–1	Los Angeles		Kuemper	18,145	2–3	
6	May 1	Los Angeles	4–6	Edmonton		Kuemper	18,347	2–4	

Legend: Win Loss

== Player statistics ==
As of end of the season

=== Skaters ===
Regular season
Player	GP	G	A	Pts	+/−	PIM
Adrian Kempe	81	35	38	73	+22	36
Anze Kopitar	81	21	46	67	+14	4
Kevin Fiala	81	35	25	60	−7	38
Quinton Byfield	81	23	31	54	+16	46
Warren Foegele	82	24	22	46	+36	24
Phillip Danault	80	8	35	43	+20	26
Alex Laferriere	77	19	23	42	+22	20
Trevor Moore	71	18	22	40	+17	14
Brandt Clarke	78	5	28	33	+13	46
Vladislav Gavrikov	82	5	25	30	+26	28
Jordan Spence	79	4	24	28	+23	16
Alex Turcotte	68	9	16	25	+6	20
Mikey Anderson	77	6	18	24	+17	28
Joel Edmundson	73	6	14	20	+25	22
Andrei Kuzmenko†	22	5	12	17	+6	2
Drew Doughty	30	4	13	17	+9	20
Tanner Jeannot	67	7	6	13	0	89
Trevor Lewis	60	6	6	12	−4	20
Jacob Moverare	49	1	7	8	+2	10
Samuel Helenius	50	4	3	7	+1	25
Akil Thomas	25	1	2	3	−4	7
Kyle Burroughs	33	0	3	3	+3	39
Andre Lee	19	1	2	3	−5	11
Jeff Malott	12	0	1	1	−1	7
Andreas Englund‡	11	1	0	1	−1	12
Taylor Ward	1	1	0	1	0	0
Caleb Jones	6	0	0	0	−1	2

Playoffs
Player	GP	G	A	Pts	+/−	PIM
Adrian Kempe	6	4	6	10	−8	4
Anze Kopitar	6	2	7	9	−6	0
Phillip Danault	6	2	6	8	+2	0
Kevin Fiala	6	3	4	7	0	2
Andrei Kuzmenko	6	3	3	6	−5	4
Quinton Byfield	6	3	1	4	−7	2
Trevor Moore	6	2	2	4	+3	0
Drew Doughty	6	1	3	4	−7	6
Warren Foegele	6	1	2	3	+1	0
Alex Laferriere	6	0	3	3	+1	2
Brandt Clarke	6	2	0	2	+1	0
Vladislav Gavrikov	6	0	2	2	−1	2
Jordan Spence	5	1	0	1	−1	0
Joel Edmundson	6	0	1	1	+2	2
Mikey Anderson	6	0	1	1	−4	2
Samuel Helenius	6	0	1	1	−1	0
Trevor Lewis	2	0	0	0	0	0
Jacob Moverare	2	0	0	0	0	0
Alex Turcotte	3	0	0	0	−2	0
Jeff Malott	6	0	0	0	−2	0

=== Goaltenders ===
Regular season
Player	GP	GS	TOI	W	L	OT	GA	GAA	SA	SV%	SO	G	A	PIM
Darcy Kuemper	50	50	2973:39	31	11	7	100	2.02	1267	.922	5	0	1	10
David Rittich	34	31	1860:28	16	14	2	88	2.84	771	.886	0	0	0	2
Erik Portillo	1	1	58:37	1	0	0	1	1.02	29	.966	0	0	0	0
Pheonix Copley	1	0	27:29	0	0	0	2	4.37	12	.833	0	0	0	0

Playoffs
Player	GP	GS	TOI	W	L	GA	GAA	SA	SV%	SO	G	A	PIM
Darcy Kuemper	6	6	369:20	2	4	23	3.74	207	.889	0	0	0	0

^{†}Denotes player spent time with another team before joining the Kings. Stats reflect time with the Kings only.
^{‡}Denotes player was traded mid-season. Stats reflect time with the Kings only.
Bold/italics denotes franchise record.

== Transactions ==
The Kings have been involved in the following transactions during the 2024–25 season.

=== Key ===
† Contract is entry-level.
‡ Contract initially takes effect in the 2025–26 season.

=== Trades ===
Date	Details		Ref
June 29, 2024	To Tampa Bay Lightning 4th-round pick in 2024; 2nd-round pick in 2025	To Los Angeles Kings Tanner Jeannot	
February 26, 2025	To Los Angeles Kings Joseph Cecconi	To Minnesota Wild Tyler Madden	
March 7, 2025	To Los Angeles Kings Andrei Kuzmenko*; 7th-round pick in 2025	To Philadelphia Flyers 3rd-round pick in 2027	

=== Players acquired ===
Date	Player	Former team	Term	Via	Ref
July 1, 2024	Joel Edmundson	Toronto Maple Leafs	4-year	Free agency	
July 1, 2024	Warren Foegele	Edmonton Oilers	3-year	Free agency	
July 1, 2024	Glenn Gawdin	Anaheim Ducks	2-year	Free agency	
July 1, 2024	Jeff Malott	Winnipeg Jets	2-year	Free agency	
July 1, 2024	Jack Studnicka	San Jose Sharks	1-year	Free agency	
July 1, 2024	Reilly Walsh	Boston Bruins	1-year	Free agency	
July 5, 2024	Caleb Jones	Colorado Avalanche	1-year	Free agency	

=== Players lost ===
Date	Player	New team	Term	Via	Ref
July 1, 2024	Viktor Arvidsson	Edmonton Oilers	2-year	Free agency	
July 1, 2024	Kevin Connauton	Utah Hockey Club	2-year	Free agency	
July 1, 2024	Blake Lizotte	Pittsburgh Penguins	2-year	Free agency	
July 1, 2024	Matt Roy	Washington Capitals	6-year	Free agency	
July 1, 2024	Steven Santini	Tampa Bay Lightning	1-year	Free agency	
July 1, 2024	Cam Talbot	Detroit Red Wings	2-year	Free agency	
July 1, 2024	T. J. Tynan	Colorado Avalanche	1-year	Free agency	
July 2, 2024	Hayden Hodgson	Ottawa Senators	1-year	Free agency	
January 6, 2025	Arthur Kaliyev	New York Rangers		Waivers	
February 10, 2025	Andreas Englund	Nashville Predators		Waivers	

=== Signings ===
Date	Player	Term	Ref
July 25, 2024	Carter George	3-year†‡	

== Draft picks ==
Below are the Kings selections at the 2024 NHL entry draft, which was held on June 28 and 29, 2024, at Sphere in Paradise, Nevada.

Round	#	Player	Pos	Nationality	College/Junior/Club team (League)
1	26	Liam Greentree	RW	Canada	Windsor Spitfires (OHL)
2	57	Carter George	G	Canada	Owen Sound Attack (OHL)
6	164	Jared Woolley	D	Canada	London Knights (OHL)
7	198	James Reeder	RW	United States	Dubuque Fighting Saints (USHL)
