= 2024–25 New Jersey Devils season =

National Hockey League season

2024–25 New Jersey Devils
- Division: 3rd Metropolitan
- Conference: 7th Eastern
- 2024–25 record: 42–33–7
- Home record: 19–17–5
- Road record: 23–16–2
- Goals for: 242
- Goals against: 222

Team information
- General manager: Tom Fitzgerald
- Coach: Sheldon Keefe
- Captain: Nico Hischier
- Alternate captains: Jack Hughes; Ondrej Palat
- Arena: Prudential Center
- Average attendance: 16,154
- Minor league affiliates: Utica Comets (AHL); Adirondack Thunder (ECHL)

Team leaders
- Goals: Nico Hischier (35)
- Assists: Jesper Bratt (67)
- Points: Jesper Bratt (88)
- Penalty minutes: Johnathan Kovacevic (72)
- Plus/minus: Jack Hughes (+12)
- Wins: Jacob Markstrom (26)
- Goals against average: Nico Daws (1.60)

The 2024–25 New Jersey Devils season was the 51st season for the National Hockey League (NHL) franchise that was established on June 11, 1974, and 43rd season since the franchise relocated from Colorado prior to the 1982–83 NHL season.

On April 9, 2025, the Devils clinched a playoff spot after missing the playoffs the previous season following the New York Rangers loss to the Philadelphia Flyers.

On April 29, the Devils were defeated by the Carolina Hurricanes in the first round of the playoffs in five games.

== Offseason ==
The Devils made numerous personnel changes prior to the start of the season. Sheldon Keefe was hired as head coach, replacing interim head coach Travis Green.

Following the draft, the Devils made a number of moves during the free agency period. The most noteworthy move came in an unexpected blockbuster deal that sent Akira Schmid to the Vegas Golden Knights, along with Alexander Holtz, in exchange for Paul Cotter.

== Standings ==
=== Divisional standings ===
Metropolitan Division
Pos	Team	GP	W	L	OTL	RW	GF	GA	GD	Pts
1	z – Washington Capitals	82	51	22	9	43	288	232	+56	111
2	x – Carolina Hurricanes	82	47	30	5	42	266	233	+33	99
3	x – New Jersey Devils	82	42	33	7	36	242	222	+20	91
4	Columbus Blue Jackets	82	40	33	9	30	273	268	+5	89
5	New York Rangers	82	39	36	7	35	256	255	+1	85
6	New York Islanders	82	35	35	12	28	224	260	−36	82
7	Pittsburgh Penguins	82	34	36	12	24	243	293	−50	80
8	Philadelphia Flyers	82	33	39	10	21	238	286	−48	76

Source: National Hockey League
Rules for classification: 1) Fewer number of games played (GP, only during regular season); 2) Greater number of regulation wins (RW); 3) Greater number of wins in regulation and overtime, excluding shootout wins (ROW); 4) Greater number of total wins, including shootouts (W); 5) Greater number of points earned in head-to-head play; if teams played an uneven number of head-to-head games, the result of the first game on the home ice of the team with the extra home game is discarded; 6) Greater goal differential (GD); 7) Greater number of goals scored (GF)
x – Clinched playoff spot; z – Clinched conference

=== Conference standings ===
Eastern Conference Wild Card
Pos	Div	Team	GP	W	L	OTL	RW	GF	GA	GD	Pts
1	AT	x – Ottawa Senators	82	45	30	7	35	243	234	+9	97
2	AT	x – Montreal Canadiens	82	40	31	11	30	245	265	−20	91
3	ME	Columbus Blue Jackets	82	40	33	9	30	273	268	+5	89
4	AT	Detroit Red Wings	82	39	35	8	30	238	259	−21	86
5	ME	New York Rangers	82	39	36	7	35	256	255	+1	85
6	ME	New York Islanders	82	35	35	12	28	224	260	−36	82
7	ME	Pittsburgh Penguins	82	34	36	12	24	243	293	−50	80
8	AT	Buffalo Sabres	82	36	39	7	29	269	289	−20	79
9	AT	Boston Bruins	82	33	39	10	26	222	272	−50	76
10	ME	Philadelphia Flyers	82	33	39	10	21	238	286	−48	76

Source: National Hockey League
Rules for classification: 1) Fewer number of games played (GP, only during regular season); 2) Greater number of regulation wins (RW); 3) Greater number of wins in regulation and overtime, excluding shootout wins (ROW); 4) Greater number of total wins, including shootouts (W); 5) Greater number of points earned in head-to-head play; if teams played an uneven number of head-to-head games, the result of the first game on the home ice of the team with the extra home game is discarded; 6) Greater goal differential (GD); 7) Greater number of goals scored (GF)
x – Clinched playoff spot

== Schedule and results ==
=== Preseason ===
The preseason schedule was published on June 17, 2024.

2024 preseason game log: 1–6–0 (home: 1–2–0; road: 0–4–0)
#	Date	Visitor	Score	Home	OT	Decision	Attendance	Record	Recap
1	September 22	NY Islanders	4–2	New Jersey		Daws	10,815	0–1–0
2	September 24	New Jersey	0–3	Montreal		Allen	20,539	0–2–0
3	September 25	Washington	5–3	New Jersey		Markstrom	7,092	0–3–0
4	September 27	New Jersey	1–5	NY Islanders		Allen	11,420	0–4–0
5	September 30	NY Rangers	1–3	New Jersey		Brodeur	13,444	1–4–0
6	October 1	New Jersey	4–5	NY Rangers		Brennan	17,110	1–5–0
7	October 3	New Jersey	4–5	Philadelphia		Poulter	12,751	1–6–0

=== Regular season ===
The regular season schedule was published on July 2, 2024.

2024–25 game log

October: 7–4–2 (home: 3–2–2; road: 4–2–0)
#	Date	Visitor	Score	Home	OT	Decision	Attendance	Record	Pts	Recap
1^{[a]}	October 4	New Jersey	4–1	Buffalo		Markstrom	16,913	1–0–0	2
2^{[a]}	October 5	Buffalo	1–3	New Jersey		Allen	16,722	2–0–0	4
3	October 10	Toronto	4–2	New Jersey		Markstrom	16,764	2–1–0	4
4	October 12	New Jersey	5–3	Washington		Markstrom	18,573	3–1–0	6
5	October 14	Utah	0–3	New Jersey		Allen	16,514	4–1–0	8
6	October 15	New Jersey	2–4	Carolina		Markstrom	18,700	4–2–0	8
7	October 17	New Jersey	3–1	Ottawa		Markstrom	15,192	5–2–0	10
8	October 19	Washington	6–5	New Jersey	OT	Markstrom	16,514	5–2–1	11
9	October 22	Tampa Bay	8–5	New Jersey		Allen	15,410	5–3–1	11
10	October 24	New Jersey	3–5	Detroit		Markstrom	19,515	5–4–1	11
11	October 25	NY Islanders	4–3	New Jersey	OT	Allen	14,870	5–4–2	12
12	October 27	Anaheim	2–6	New Jersey		Markstrom	14,344	6–4–2	14
13	October 30	New Jersey	6–0	Vancouver		Markstrom	18,717	7–4–2	16

November: 9–5–0 (home: 3–3–0; road: 6–2–0)
#	Date	Visitor	Score	Home	OT	Decision	Attendance	Record	Pts	Recap
14	November 1	New Jersey	0–3	Calgary		Markstrom	16,275	7–5–2	16
15	November 4	New Jersey	3–0	Edmonton		Allen	18,347	8–5–2	18
16	November 7	Montreal	3–5	New Jersey		Markstrom	16,514	9–5–2	20
17	November 9	New Jersey	4–3	NY Islanders	OT	Markstrom	17,255	10–5–2	22
18	November 10	San Jose	1–0	New Jersey		Allen	16,514	10–6–2	22
19	November 12	New Jersey	4–1	Florida		Markstrom	18,677	11–6–2	24
20	November 14	New Jersey	6–2	Florida		Allen	18,573	12–6–2	26
21	November 16	New Jersey	0–4	Tampa Bay		Markstrom	19,092	12–7–2	26
22	November 21	Carolina	2–4	New Jersey		Markstrom	16,086	13–7–2	28
23	November 23	New Jersey	3–2	Washington		Allen	18,573	14–7–2	30
24	November 25	Nashville	2–5	New Jersey		Markstrom	16,514	15–7–2	32
25	November 27	St. Louis	3–0	New Jersey		Markstrom	16,043	15–8–2	32
26	November 29	New Jersey	5–4	Detroit		Markstrom	19,515	16–8–2	34
27	November 30	Washington	6–5	New Jersey		Allen	16,514	16–9–2	34

December: 8–4–1 (home: 6–1–1; road: 2–3–0)
#	Date	Visitor	Score	Home	OT	Decision	Attendance	Record	Pts	Recap
28	December 2	New Jersey	5–1	NY Rangers		Markstrom	18,006	17–9–2	36
29	December 6	Seattle	2–3	New Jersey		Markstrom	15,582	18–9–2	38
30	December 8	Colorado	4–0	New Jersey		Allen	15,044	18–10–2	38
31	December 10	Toronto	2–1	New Jersey	OT	Markstrom	16,091	18–10–3	39
32	December 12	Los Angeles	1–3	New Jersey		Markstrom	15,051	19–10–3	41
33	December 14	Chicago	1–4	New Jersey		Markstrom	16,514	20–10–3	43
34	December 17	New Jersey	4–1	St. Louis		Markstrom	18,096	21–10–3	45
35	December 19	New Jersey	2–4	Columbus		Allen	15,793	21–11–3	45
36	December 21	Pittsburgh	0–3	New Jersey		Markstrom	16,514	22–11–3	47
37	December 23	NY Rangers	0–5	New Jersey		Markstrom	16,514	23–11–3	49
38	December 27	Carolina	2–4	New Jersey		Markstrom	16,629	24–11–3	51
39	December 28	New Jersey	2–5	Carolina		Allen	18,825	24–12–3	51
40	December 31	New Jersey	2–3	Anaheim		Markstrom	17,174	24–13–3	51

January: 5–5–3 (home: 3–2–1; road: 2–3–2)
#	Date	Visitor	Score	Home	OT	Decision	Attendance	Record	Pts	Recap
41	January 1	New Jersey	0–3	Los Angeles		Allen	18,145	24–14–3	51
42	January 4	New Jersey	2–3	San Jose		Markstrom	17,435	24–15–3	51
43	January 6	New Jersey	3–2	Seattle		Markstrom	17,151	25–15–3	53
44	January 9	New Jersey	2–3	NY Rangers	OT	Markstrom	18,006	25–15–4	54
45	January 11	Tampa Bay	2–3	New Jersey	OT	Markstrom	16,514	26–15–4	56
46	January 14	Florida	2–1	New Jersey	SO	Markstrom	16,514	26–15–5	57
47	January 16	New Jersey	3–4	Toronto	OT	Markstrom	18,577	26–15–6	58
48	January 18	Philadelphia	3–1	New Jersey		Allen	16,514	26–16–6	58
49	January 19	Ottawa	2–1	New Jersey		Markstrom	16,514	26–17–6	58
50	January 22	Boston	1–5	New Jersey		Allen	16,025	27–17–6	60
51	January 25	New Jersey	4–3	Montreal	OT	Allen	21,105	28–17–6	62
52	January 27	New Jersey	2–4	Philadelphia		Allen	19,380	28–18–6	62
53	January 29	Philadelphia	0–5	New Jersey		Allen	16,026	29–18–6	64

February: 3–4–0 (home: 0–2–0; road: 3–2–0)
#	Date	Visitor	Score	Home	OT	Decision	Attendance	Record	Pts	Recap
54	February 2	New Jersey	3–4	Buffalo		Allen	15,710	29–19–6	64
55	February 4	New Jersey	3–2	Pittsburgh	SO	Daws	15,916	30–19–6	66
56	February 6	Vegas	3–1	New Jersey		Allen	16,514	30–20–6	66
57	February 8	New Jersey	4–0	Montreal		Allen	21,105	31–20–6	68
58	February 22	Dallas	4–2	New Jersey		Allen	16,514	31–21–6	68
59	February 23	New Jersey	5–0	Nashville		Daws	17,159	32–21–6	70
60	February 26	New Jersey	1–5	Colorado		Allen	18,087	32–22–6	70

March: 8–7–1 (home: 3–3–1; road: 5–4–0)
#	Date	Visitor	Score	Home	OT	Decision	Attendance	Record	Pts	Recap
61	March 1	New Jersey	3–1	Utah		Daws	11,131	33–22–6	72
62	March 2	New Jersey	0–2	Vegas		Markstrom	17,941	33–23–6	72
63	March 4	New Jersey	3–4	Dallas		Markstrom	18,532	33–24–6	72
64	March 7	Winnipeg	6–1	New Jersey		Markstrom	16,088	33–25–6	72
65	March 9	New Jersey	3–1	Philadelphia		Allen	19,271	34–25–6	74
66	March 11	Columbus	3–5	New Jersey		Markstrom	15,630	35–25–6	76
67	March 13	Edmonton	2–3	New Jersey		Allen	16,514	36–25–6	78
68	March 15	New Jersey	3–7	Pittsburgh		Markstrom	15,442	36–26–6	78
69	March 17	New Jersey	2–1	Columbus		Allen	16,708	37–26–6	80
70	March 20	Calgary	5–3	New Jersey		Markstrom	16,027	37–27–6	80
71	March 22	Ottawa	3–2	New Jersey		Allen	16,514	37–28–6	80
72	March 24	Vancouver	4–3	New Jersey	SO	Markstrom	16,113	37–28–7	81
73	March 26	New Jersey	5–3	Chicago		Markstrom	17,813	38–28–7	83
74	March 28	New Jersey	0–4	Winnipeg		Allen	15,225	38–29–7	83
75	March 29	New Jersey	5–2	Minnesota		Markstrom	19,265	39–29–7	85
76	March 31	Minnesota	2–3	New Jersey	SO	Markstrom	15,468	40–29–7	87

April: 2–4–0 (home: 1–4–0; road: 1–0–0)
#	Date	Visitor	Score	Home	OT	Decision	Attendance	Record	Pts	Recap
77	April 5	NY Rangers	0–4	New Jersey		Markstrom	16,514	41–29–7	89
78	April 8	Boston	7–2	New Jersey		Markstrom	15,507	41–30–7	89
79	April 11	Pittsburgh	4–2	New Jersey		Allen	16,514	41–31–7	89
80	April 13	NY Islanders	1–0	New Jersey		Markstrom	16,514	41–32–7	89
81	April 15	New Jersey	5–4	Boston	OT	Allen	17,850	42–32–7	91
82	April 16	Detroit	5–2	New Jersey		Daws	16,514	42–33–7	91

Legend: Win (2 points) Loss (0 points) Overtime/shootout loss (1 point)
Notes:
^{a} Game played at O2 Arena in Prague, Czech Republic

=== Playoffs ===
The Devils faced the Carolina Hurricanes in the First Round and lost the series in five games.

2025 Stanley Cup playoffs

Eastern Conference First Round vs. (M2) Carolina Hurricanes: Carolina won 4–1
#	Date	Visitor	Score	Home	OT	Decision	Location	Attendance	Series	Recap
1	April 20	New Jersey	1–4	Carolina		Markstrom	Lenovo Center	18,895	0–1
2	April 22	New Jersey	1–3	Carolina		Markstrom	Lenovo Center	18,895	0–2
3	April 25	Carolina	2–3	New Jersey	2OT	Markstrom	Prudential Center	16,682	1–2
4	April 27	Carolina	5–2	New Jersey		Markstrom	Prudential Center	17,054	1–3
5	April 29	New Jersey	4–5	Carolina	2OT	Markstrom	Lenovo Center	18,933	1–4

Legend: Win Loss

== Player statistics ==
As of April 16, 2025

=== Skaters ===
Regular season
Player	GP	G	A	Pts	+/−	PIM
Jesper Bratt	81	21	67	88	+5	18
Jack Hughes	62	27	43	70	+12	18
Nico Hischier	75	35	34	69	+9	20
Timo Meier	80	26	27	53	+7	58
Luke Hughes	71	7	37	44	−9	16
Stefan Noesen	78	22	19	41	−8	54
Dougie Hamilton	64	9	31	40	+8	30
Dawson Mercer	82	19	17	36	+4	16
Ondrej Palat	77	15	13	28	−5	12
Paul Cotter	79	16	6	22	−14	62
Erik Haula	69	11	10	21	−6	39
Tomas Tatar	74	7	10	17	−7	20
Brett Pesce	72	3	14	17	−5	29
Johnathan Kovacevic	81	1	16	17	+10	72
Brenden Dillon	82	2	14	16	+8	67
Nathan Bastian	59	4	6	10	−4	31
Jonas Siegenthaler	55	2	7	9	+9	44
Seamus Casey	14	4	4	8	+3	0
Cody Glass^{†}	14	2	5	7	+4	4
Justin Dowling	52	2	5	7	−6	6
Brian Dumoulin^{†}	19	1	5	6	−3	4
Curtis Lazar	48	2	3	5	−6	14
Simon Nemec	27	2	2	4	−10	14
Daniel Sprong^{†}	11	0	2	2	0	0
Mike Hardman	2	0	1	1	0	0
Marc McLaughlin^{†}	2	0	1	1	−1	0
Nolan Foote	7	0	1	1	0	0
Kurtis MacDermid	23	0	0	0	−5	23
Dennis Cholowski^{†}	6	0	0	0	−4	0
Shane Bowers	4	0	0	0	−1	0
Daniil Misyul	1	0	0	0	−1	0
Nathan Legare	3	0	0	0	−1	0
Brian Halonen	2	0	0	0	−1	0

=== Goaltenders ===
Regular season
Player	GP	GS	TOI	W	L	OT	GA	GAA	SA	SV%	SO	G	A	PIM
Jacob Markstrom	49	49	2,903:01	26	16	6	121	2.50	1,214	.900	4	0	0	0
Jake Allen	31	29	1,738:10	13	16	1	77	2.66	819	.908	4	0	0	0
Nico Daws	6	4	262:51	3	1	0	7	1.60	114	.939	1	0	0	0

^{†} Denotes player spent time with another team before joining the Devils. Stats reflect time with the Devils only.

- ^{‡} Denotes player was traded mid-season. Stats reflect time with the Devils only.
- Bold/italics denotes franchise record.

=== Suspensions & Fines ===
Date	Player	Explanation	Length	Salary	Ref.
November 26, 2024	Timo Meier	Cross-checking Zachary L'Heureux	1 Game	$45,833	

== Transactions ==
The Devils have been involved in the following transactions during the 2024–25 season.

=== Trades ===
Trades
Date	To	From	Ref
June 29, 2024	To Utah Hockey Club John Marino; COL 5th-round pick in 2024 NHL entry draft	To New Jersey Devils WSH 2nd-round pick in 2024; EDM 2nd-round pick in 2025 NHL entry draft	
June 29, 2024	To Vegas Golden Knights Alexander Holtz; Akira Schmid	To New Jersey Devils Paul Cotter; 3rd-round pick in 2025	
June 30, 2024	To Montreal Canadiens Conditional 4th-round pick in 2026 NHL entry draft	To New Jersey Devils Johnathan Kovacevic	
March 4, 2025	To Boston Bruins Petr Hauser	To New Jersey Devils Trent Frederic*	
March 4, 2025	To Edmonton Oilers Trent Frederic*	To New Jersey Devils Shane Lachance	
March 6, 2025	To Anaheim Ducks Herman Traff; Conditional 2nd-round pick in 2025	To New Jersey Devils Brian Dumoulin*	
March 7, 2025	To Pittsburgh Penguins Max Graham; Chase Stillman; 3rd-round pick in 2027 NHL entry draft	To New Jersey Devils Cody Glass; Jonathan Gruden	
March 7, 2025	To Seattle Kraken 7th-round pick in 2026	ToNew Jersey Devils Daniel Sprong	
March 7, 2025	To New York Islanders Adam Beckman	To New Jersey Devils Dennis Cholowski	

=== Free agents ===
Free agents
Date	Player	Previous Team	Contract Terms	Ref
July 1, 2024	Mike Hardman	Chicago Blackhawks	2-year	
July 1, 2024	Brett Pesce	Carolina Hurricanes	6-year	

=== Waivers ===
Waivers
Date	Player	Team	Ref
October 6, 2024	Colton White	Placed on waivers by New Jersey Devils	
January 25, 2024	Nick DeSimone	Claimed from Calgary Flames	
January 5, 2025	Nick DeSimone	Claimed by Utah Hockey Club	

=== Contract terminations ===
Date	Player	Via	Ref

=== Signings ===
Signings
Date	Player	Contract term	Ref
March 7, 2025	Dennis Cholowski	Acquired via trade, signed for remainder of season	
March 7, 2025	Cody Glass	Acquired via trade, signed for remainder of season	
March 7, 2025	Johnathan Kovacevic	5-year	
March 7, 2025	Daniel Sprong	Acquired via trade, signed for remainder of season	

== Draft picks ==
Below are the New Jersey Devils' selections at the 2024 NHL entry draft, which was held on June 28 and 29, 2024, at the Sphere in Paradise, Nevada.

Round	#	Player	Pos	Nationality	College/junior/club team
1	10	Anton Silayev	D	Russia	Torpedo Nizhny Novgorod (KHL)
2	49	Mikhail Yegorov	G	Russia	Omaha Lancers (USHL)
3	85	Kasper Pikkarainen	RW	Finland	HC TPS (U20 SM-sarja)
3	91	Herman Traff	LW	Sweden	HV71 (J20 Nationell)
5	139	Max Graham	C	Canada	Kelowna Rockets (WHL)
5	146	Veeti Louhivaara	G	Finland	JYP (U20 SM-sarja)
6	171	Matyas Melovsky	C	Czech Republic	Baie-Comeau Drakkar (QMJHL)
