= 2024–25 St. Louis Blues season =

National Hockey League season

2024–25 St. Louis Blues
- Division: 5th Central
- Conference: 8th Western
- 2024–25 record: 44–30–8
- Home record: 24–14–3
- Road record: 20–16–5
- Goals for: 254
- Goals against: 233

Team information
- General manager: Doug Armstrong
- Coach: Drew Bannister (Oct. 8 – Nov. 24); Jim Montgomery (Nov. 24 – pres.)
- Captain: Brayden Schenn
- Alternate captains: Justin Faulk; Colton Parayko; Robert Thomas
- Average attendance: 17,724
- Minor league affiliates: Springfield Thunderbirds (AHL); Florida Everblades (ECHL)

Team leaders
- Goals: Jordan Kyrou (34)
- Assists: Robert Thomas (57)
- Points: Robert Thomas (78)
- Penalty minutes: Brayden Schenn; Nathan Walker (61)
- Plus/minus: Philip Broberg; Dylan Holloway; Jordan Kyrou (+21)
- Wins: Jordan Binnington (27)
- Goals against average: Joel Hofer (2.64)

The 2024–25 St. Louis Blues season was the 58th season for the National Hockey League (NHL) franchise that was established in 1967.

Drew Bannister signed a two-year extension to become the new head coach after taking over from Craig Berube who was fired last season.

On November 24, 2024, the Blues fired Bannister and signed former Boston Bruins head coach Jim Montgomery, who was fired from the Bruins just five days prior, to a five-year contract the same day. Montgomery had previously served as an assistant coach with the Blues from 2020–2022, under former head coach Craig Berube.

On April 15, 2025, the Blues clinched a playoff berth for the first time since the 2021–22 season following a 6–1 win over the Utah Hockey Club. They faced the Presidents' Trophy-winning Winnipeg Jets in the first round of the playoffs and lost in seven games.

== Standings ==
=== Divisional standings ===
Central Division
Pos	Team	GP	W	L	OTL	RW	GF	GA	GD	Pts
1	p – Winnipeg Jets	82	56	22	4	43	277	191	+86	116
2	x – Dallas Stars	82	50	26	6	41	277	224	+53	106
3	x – Colorado Avalanche	82	49	29	4	40	277	234	+43	102
4	x – Minnesota Wild	82	45	30	7	33	228	239	−11	97
5	x – St. Louis Blues	82	44	30	8	32	254	233	+21	96
6	Utah Hockey Club	82	38	31	13	30	241	251	−10	89
7	Nashville Predators	82	30	44	8	24	214	274	−60	68
8	Chicago Blackhawks	82	25	46	11	20	226	296	−70	61

Source: National Hockey League
Rules for classification: 1) Fewer number of games played (GP, only during regular season); 2) Greater number of regulation wins (RW); 3) Greater number of wins in regulation and overtime, excluding shootout wins (ROW); 4) Greater number of total wins, including shootouts (W); 5) Greater number of points earned in head-to-head play; if teams played an uneven number of head-to-head games, the result of the first game on the home ice of the team with the extra home game is discarded; 6) Greater goal differential (GD); 7) Greater number of goals scored (GF)
p – Clinched Presidents' Trophy; x – Clinched playoff spot

=== Conference standings ===
Western Conference Wild Card
Pos	Div	Team	GP	W	L	OTL	RW	GF	GA	GD	Pts
1	CE	x – Minnesota Wild	82	45	30	7	33	228	239	−11	97
2	CE	x – St. Louis Blues	82	44	30	8	32	254	233	+21	96
3	PA	Calgary Flames	82	41	27	14	31	225	238	−13	96
4	PA	Vancouver Canucks	82	38	30	14	28	236	253	−17	90
5	CE	Utah Hockey Club	82	38	31	13	30	241	251	−10	89
6	PA	Anaheim Ducks	82	35	37	10	24	221	263	−42	80
7	PA	Seattle Kraken	82	35	41	6	28	247	265	−18	76
8	CE	Nashville Predators	82	30	44	8	24	214	274	−60	68
9	CE	Chicago Blackhawks	82	25	46	11	20	226	296	−70	61
10	PA	San Jose Sharks	82	20	50	12	14	210	315	−105	52

Source: National Hockey League
Rules for classification: 1) Fewer number of games played (GP, only during regular season); 2) Greater number of regulation wins (RW); 3) Greater number of wins in regulation and overtime, excluding shootout wins (ROW); 4) Greater number of total wins, including shootouts (W); 5) Greater number of points earned in head-to-head play; if teams played an uneven number of head-to-head games, the result of the first game on the home ice of the team with the extra home game is discarded; 6) Greater goal differential (GD); 7) Greater number of goals scored (GF)
x – Clinched playoff spot

== Schedule and results ==
=== Preseason ===
The Blues preseason schedule was released on June 20, 2024.

2024 preseason game log: 2–5–0 (home: 2–1–0; road: 0–4–0)
#	Date	Visitor	Score	Home	OT	Decision	Location	Attendance	Record	Recap
1	September 21	St. Louis	1–2	Dallas		Ellis	American Airlines Center	15,765	0–1–0
2	September 22	St. Louis	3–5	Utah		Zherenko	Wells Fargo Arena	8,851	0–2–0
3	September 25	St. Louis	0–3	Columbus		Hofer	Nationwide Arena	10,077	0–3–0
4	September 28	Chicago	2–3	St. Louis	OT	Ellis	Enterprise Center	18,096	1–3–0
5	October 1	Columbus	3–1	St. Louis		Hofer	Enterprise Center	15,305	1–4–0
6	October 3	Dallas	3–4	St. Louis	OT	Binnington	Enterprise Center	16,386	2–4–0
7	October 5	St. Louis	2–6	Chicago		Zherenko	Fiserv Forum		2–5–0
Legend: Win Loss OT/SO Loss

=== Regular season ===
The regular season schedule was published on July 2, 2024.

2024–25 game log

October: 5–6–0 (home: 2–2–0; road: 3–4–0)
#	Date	Visitor	Score	Home	OT	Decision	Location	Attendance	Record	Pts	Recap
1	October 8	St. Louis	3–2	Seattle		Binnington	Climate Pledge Arena	17,151	1–0–0	2
2	October 10	St. Louis	5–4	San Jose	OT	Hofer	SAP Center	17,435	2–0–0	4
3	October 11	St. Louis	3–4	Vegas		Binnington	T-Mobile Arena	17,861	2–1–0	4
4	October 15	Minnesota	4–1	St. Louis		Binnington	Enterprise Center	18,096	2–2–0	4
5	October 17	NY Islanders	0–1	St. Louis	OT	Hofer	Enterprise Center	17,109	3–2–0	6
6	October 19	Carolina	3–4	St. Louis		Hofer	Enterprise Center	18,096	4–2–0	8
7	October 22	Winnipeg	3–2	St. Louis		Binnington	Enterprise Center	17,335	4–3–0	8
8	October 24	St. Louis	5–1	Toronto		Binnington	Scotiabank Arena	18,414	5–3–0	10
9	October 26	St. Louis	2–5	Montreal		Binnington	Bell Centre	21,105	5–4–0	10
10	October 29	St. Louis	1–8	Ottawa		Hofer	Canadian Tire Centre	15,784	5–5–0	10
11	October 31	St. Louis	1–2	Philadelphia		Binnington	Wells Fargo Center	14,122	5–6–0	10

November: 6–6–2 (home: 3–4–1; road: 3–2–1)
#	Date	Visitor	Score	Home	OT	Decision	Location	Attendance	Record	Pts	Recap
12	November 2	Toronto	2–4	St. Louis		Binnington	Enterprise Center	18,096	6–6–0	12
13	November 5	Tampa Bay	2–3	St. Louis		Binnington	Enterprise Center	17,161	7–6–0	14
14	November 7	Utah	4–2	St. Louis		Hofer	Enterprise Center	17,528	7–7–0	14
15	November 9	Washington	8–1	St. Louis		Binnington	Enterprise Center	18,096	7–8–0	14
16	November 12	Boston	3–2	St. Louis		Binnington	Enterprise Center	18,096	7–9–0	14
17	November 14	St. Louis	3–4	Buffalo	OT	Binnington	KeyBank Center	13,943	7–9–1	15
18	November 16	St. Louis	3–2	Boston	OT	Binnington	TD Garden	17,850	8–9–1	17
19	November 17	St. Louis	1–4	Carolina		Hofer	Lenovo Center	18,797	8–10–1	17
20	November 19	Minnesota	4–2	St. Louis		Binnington	Enterprise Center	16,463	8–11–1	17
21	November 21	San Jose	2–3	St. Louis	SO	Binnington	Enterprise Center	17,273	9–11–1	19
22	November 23	St. Louis	1–3	NY Islanders		Binnington	UBS Arena	17,255	9–12–1	19
23	November 25	St. Louis	5–2	NY Rangers		Hofer	Madison Square Garden	18,006	10–12–1	21
24	November 27	St. Louis	3–0	New Jersey		Binnington	Prudential Center	16,043	11–12–1	23
25	November 30	Philadelphia	3–2	St. Louis	OT	Binnington	Enterprise Center	16,863	11–12–2	24

December: 7–5–2 (home: 2–3–0; road: 5–2–2)
#	Date	Visitor	Score	Home	OT	Decision	Location	Attendance	Record	Pts	Recap
26	December 3	St. Louis	4–1	Winnipeg		Hofer	Canada Life Centre	13,100	12–12–2	26
27	December 5	St. Louis	4–3	Calgary	OT	Binnington	Scotiabank Saddledome	17,060	13–12–2	28
28	December 7	St. Louis	2–4	Edmonton		Binnington	Rogers Place	18,347	13–13–2	28
29	December 10	St. Louis	4–3	Vancouver	OT	Hofer	Rogers Arena	18,754	14–13–2	30
30	December 12	San Jose	4–3	St. Louis		Binnington	Enterprise Center	18,096	14–14–2	30
31	December 14	St. Louis	1–2	Dallas	OT	Binnington	American Airlines Center	18,532	14–14–3	31
32	December 15	NY Rangers	2–3	St. Louis		Hofer	Enterprise Center	17,569	15–14–3	33
33	December 17	New Jersey	4–1	St. Louis		Binnington	Enterprise Center	18,096	15–15–3	33
34	December 19	St. Louis	1–3	Tampa Bay		Binnington	Amalie Arena	19,092	15–16–3	33
35	December 20	St. Louis	1–2	Florida	OT	Hofer	Amerant Bank Arena	18,522	15–16–4	34
36	December 23	St. Louis	4–0	Detroit		Binnington	Little Caesars Arena	19,515	16–16–4	36
37	December 27	Nashville	4–7	St. Louis		Hofer	Enterprise Center	18,096	17–16–4	38
38	December 29	Buffalo	4–2	St. Louis		Binnington	Enterprise Center	18,096	17–17–4	38
39	December 31	St. Louis	6–2	Chicago		Binnington	Wrigley Field	40,933	18–17–4	40

January: 5–8–0 (home: 4–4–0; road: 1–4–0)
#	Date	Visitor	Score	Home	OT	Decision	Location	Attendance	Record	Pts	Recap
40	January 3	Ottawa	0–4	St. Louis		Binnington	Enterprise Center	18,096	19–17–4	42
41	January 4	St. Louis	4–6	Columbus		Hofer	Nationwide Arena	18,535	19–18–4	42
42	January 7	St. Louis	4–6	Minnesota		Binnington	Xcel Energy Center	18,464	19–19–4	42
43	January 9	Anaheim	2–6	St. Louis		Hofer	Enterprise Center	17,176	20–19–4	44
44	January 11	Columbus	2–1	St. Louis		Binnington	Enterprise Center	17,591	20–20–4	44
45	January 14	Calgary	1–2	St. Louis		Binnington	Enterprise Center	16,992	21–20–4	46
46	January 16	Calgary	3–5	St. Louis		Hofer	Enterprise Center	17,456	22–20–4	48
47	January 18	St. Louis	2–4	Utah		Binnington	Delta Center	11,131	22–21–4	48
48	January 20	St. Louis	5–4	Vegas	SO	Binnington	T-Mobile Arena	17,879	23–21–4	50
49	January 23	Vegas	4–2	St. Louis		Hofer	Enterprise Center	17,430	23–22–4	50
50	January 25	Dallas	2–0	St. Louis		Binnington	Enterprise Center	17,755	23–23–4	50
51	January 27	Vancouver	5–2	St. Louis		Binnington	Enterprise Center	17,445	23–24–4	50
52	January 31	St. Louis	0–5	Colorado		Hofer	Ball Arena	18,073	23–25–4	50

February: 5–1–2 (home: 3–1–2; road: 2–0–0)
#	Date	Visitor	Score	Home	OT	Decision	Location	Attendance	Record	Pts	Recap
53	February 2	St. Louis	2–1	Utah		Binnington	Delta Center	11,131	24–25–4	52
54	February 4	Edmonton	3–2	St. Louis	OT	Binnington	Enterprise Center	17,485	24–25–5	53
55	February 6	Florida	3–2	St. Louis		Hofer	Enterprise Center	17,230	24–26–5	53
56	February 8	Chicago	5–6	St. Louis	SO	Binnington	Enterprise Center	18,096	25–26–5	55
57	February 22	Winnipeg	4–3	St. Louis	SO	Hofer	Enterprise Center	17,665	25–26–6	56
58	February 23	Colorado	1–3	St. Louis		Binnington	Enterprise Center	17,806	26–26–6	58
59	February 25	Seattle	2–7	St. Louis		Binnington	Enterprise Center	18,096	27–26–6	60
60	February 27	St. Louis	5–2	Washington		Hofer	Capital One Arena	18,573	28–26–6	62

March: 12–2–1 (home: 6–0–0; road: 6–2–1)
#	Date	Visitor	Score	Home	OT	Decision	Location	Attendance	Record	Pts	Recap
61	March 1	Los Angeles	1–4	St. Louis		Binnington	Enterprise Center	17,713	29–26–6	64
62	March 2	St. Louis	3–6	Dallas		Binnington	American Airlines Center	18,532	29–27–6	64
63	March 5	St. Louis	3–2	Los Angeles	SO	Binnington	Crypto.com Arena	14,055	30–27–6	66
64	March 7	St. Louis	4–3	Anaheim		Binnington	Honda Center	15,596	31–27–6	68
65	March 8	St. Louis	1–2	Los Angeles	OT	Hofer	Crypto.com Arena	17,796	31–27–7	69
66	March 13	St. Louis	3–5	Pittsburgh		Binnington	PPG Paints Arena	15,070	31–28–7	69
67	March 15	St. Louis	5–1	Minnesota		Hofer	Xcel Energy Center	18,568	32–28–7	71
68	March 16	Anaheim	2–7	St. Louis		Binnington	Enterprise Center	17,735	33–28–7	73
69	March 18	St. Louis	4–1	Nashville		Hofer	Bridgestone Arena	17,159	34–28–7	75
70	March 20	Vancouver	3–4	St. Louis	OT	Binnington	Enterprise Center	18,096	35–28–7	77
71	March 22	Chicago	1–4	St. Louis		Hofer	Enterprise Center	18,096	36–28–7	79
72	March 23	Nashville	1–4	St. Louis		Binnington	Enterprise Center	18,096	37–28–7	81
73	March 25	Montreal	1–6	St. Louis		Binnington	Enterprise Center	18,096	38–28–7	83
74	March 27	St. Louis	3–2	Nashville		Hofer	Bridgestone Arena	17,159	39–28–7	85
75	March 29	St. Louis	2–1	Colorado		Binnington	Ball Arena	18,129	40–28–7	87

April: 4–2–1 (home: 4–0–0; road: 0–2–1)
#	Date	Visitor	Score	Home	OT	Decision	Location	Attendance	Record	Pts	Recap
76	April 1	Detroit	1–2	St. Louis	OT	Binnington	Enterprise Center	18,096	41–28–7	89
77	April 3	Pittsburgh	4–5	St. Louis	OT	Hofer	Enterprise Center	18,096	42–28–7	91
78	April 5	Colorado	4–5	St. Louis		Binnington	Enterprise Center	18,096	43–28–7	93
79	April 7	St. Louis	1–3	Winnipeg		Hofer	Canada Life Centre	15,225	43–29–7	93
80	April 9	St. Louis	3–4	Edmonton		Binnington	Rogers Place	18,347	43–30–7	93
81	April 12	St. Louis	3–4	Seattle	SO	Binnington	Climate Pledge Arena	17,151	43–30–8	94
82	April 15	Utah	1–6	St. Louis		Binnington	Enterprise Center	18,096	44–30–8	96

Legend: Win (2 points) Loss (0 points) Overtime/shootout loss (1 point)

=== Playoffs ===
2025 Stanley Cup playoffs

Western Conference First Round vs. (C1) Winnipeg Jets: Winnipeg won 4–3
#	Date	Visitor	Score	Home	OT	Decision	Location	Attendance	Record	Recap
1	April 19	St. Louis	3–5	Winnipeg		Binnington	Canada Life Centre	15,225	0–1
2	April 21	St. Louis	1–2	Winnipeg		Binnington	Canada Life Centre	15,225	0–2
3	April 24	Winnipeg	2–7	St. Louis		Binnington	Enterprise Center	18,096	1–2
4	April 27	Winnipeg	1–5	St. Louis		Binnington	Enterprise Center	18,096	2–2
5	April 30	St. Louis	3–5	Winnipeg		Binnington	Canada Life Centre	15,225	2–3
6	May 2	Winnipeg	2–5	St. Louis		Binnington	Enterprise Center	18,096	3–3
7	May 4	St. Louis	3–4	Winnipeg	2OT	Binnington	Canada Life Centre	15,225	3–4

Legend: Win Loss

== Transactions ==
The Blues have been involved in the following transactions during the 2024–25 season.

Key:

† Contract is entry-level.
‡ Contract initially takes effect in the 2025–26 season.

=== Trades ===
Date	Details		Ref
June 28, 2024	To Columbus Blue Jackets 4th-round pick in 2025	To St. Louis Blues Alexandre Texier	
June 29, 2024	To Pittsburgh Penguins Kevin Hayes; 2nd-round pick in 2025	To St. Louis Blues Future considerations	
July 2, 2024	To Dallas Stars Future considerations	To St. Louis Blues Radek Faksa	
July 2, 2024	To Ottawa Senators Future considerations	To St. Louis Blues Mathieu Joseph; 3rd-round pick in 2025	
August 20, 2024	To Edmonton Oilers Paul Fischer; 3rd-round pick in 2028	To St. Louis Blues Future considerations	
December 14, 2024	To Anaheim Ducks Jeremie Biakabutuka; 2nd-round pick in 2027	To St. Louis Blues Cam Fowler^{1} 4th-round pick in 2027	
December 18, 2024	To Pittsburgh Penguins Pierre-Olivier Joseph	To St. Louis Blues Future considerations	
January 27, 2025	To New York Islanders Scott Perunovich	To St. Louis Blues conditional 5th-round pick in 2026^{2}	
February 13, 2025	To Pittsburgh Penguins Mathias Laferriere	To St. Louis Blues Corey Andonovski	

Notes

1. Anaheim retains 38.5% of Fowler's remaining salary.
2. Conditions unknown.

=== Players acquired ===
Date	Player	Former team	Term	Via	Ref
July 1, 2024	Corey Schueneman	Colorado Avalanche	1-year	Free agency	
July 3, 2024	Pierre-Olivier Joseph	Pittsburgh Penguins	1-year	Free agency	
July 10, 2024	Ryan Suter	Dallas Stars	1-year	Free agency	
August 20, 2024	Philip Broberg	Edmonton Oilers	2-year	Offer sheet	
August 20, 2024	Dylan Holloway	Edmonton Oilers	2-year	Offer sheet	

=== Players lost ===
Date	Player	New team	Term	Via	Ref
July 1, 2024	Calle Rosen	Colorado Avalanche	1-year	Free agency	
July 2, 2024	Adam Gaudette	Ottawa Senators	1-year	Free agency	
October 7, 2024	Jakub Vrana	Washington Capitals	1-year	Free agency	
November 19, 2024	Kasperi Kapanen	Edmonton Oilers		Waivers	

=== Signings ===
Date	Player	Term	Ref
September 30, 2024	Nikita Alexandrov	1-year	
October 22, 2024	Jake Neighbours	2-year	
October 29, 2024	Alexey Toropchenko	1-year	
January 31, 2025	Corey Schueneman	1-year	
February 28, 2025	Tyler Tucker	2-year	

== Draft picks ==
Below are the St. Louis Blues' selections at the 2024 NHL entry draft, which was held on June 28 and 29, 2024, at Sphere in Paradise, Nevada.

Round	#	Player	Pos	Nationality	College/Junior/Club team (League)
1	16	Adam Jiricek	D	Czech Republic	HC Škoda Plzeň (Czech Extraliga)
2	48	Colin Ralph	D	United States	Shattuck-Saint Mary's Sabres (USHS)
2	56	Lukas Fischer	D	United States	Sarnia Sting (OHL)
3	81	Ondrej Kos	RW	Czech Republic	Ilves (U20 SM-sarja)
3	95	Adam Jecho	C	Czech Republic	Edmonton Oil Kings (WHL)
4	113	Tomas Mrsic	C	Canada	Medicine Hat Tigers (WHL)
5	145	William McIsaac	D	Canada	Spokane Chiefs (WHL)
7	209	Antoine Dorion	C	Canada	Quebec Remparts (QMJHL)
7	211	Matvei Korotky	C	Russia	SKA-1946 (MHL)
