= 2024–25 Minnesota Wild season =

National Hockey League season

2024–25 Minnesota Wild
- Division: 4th Central
- Conference: 7th Western
- 2024–25 record: 45–30–7
- Home record: 22–17–2
- Road record: 23–13–5
- Goals for: 228
- Goals against: 239

Team information
- General manager: Bill Guerin
- Coach: John Hynes
- Captain: Jared Spurgeon
- Alternate captains: Marcus Foligno; Kirill Kaprizov
- Arena: Xcel Energy Center
- Average attendance: 18,430
- Minor league affiliates: Iowa Wild (AHL); Iowa Heartlanders (ECHL)

Team leaders
- Goals: Matt Boldy (26)
- Assists: Matt Boldy (45)
- Points: Matt Boldy (71)
- Penalty minutes: Marcus Foligno; Ryan Hartman (75)
- Plus/minus: Kirill Kaprizov (+19)
- Wins: Filip Gustavsson (31)
- Goals against average: Filip Gustavsson (2.57)

The 2024–25 Minnesota Wild season was the 25th season of operation (24th season of play) of the National Hockey League (NHL) franchise that was established on June 25, 1997.

On April 15, 2025, the Wild clinched a playoff spot after an overtime win against the Anaheim Ducks. They faced the Vegas Golden Knights in the first round and were defeated in six games.

== Standings ==
=== Divisional standings ===
Central Division
Pos	Team	GP	W	L	OTL	RW	GF	GA	GD	Pts
1	p – Winnipeg Jets	82	56	22	4	43	277	191	+86	116
2	x – Dallas Stars	82	50	26	6	41	277	224	+53	106
3	x – Colorado Avalanche	82	49	29	4	40	277	234	+43	102
4	x – Minnesota Wild	82	45	30	7	33	228	239	−11	97
5	x – St. Louis Blues	82	44	30	8	32	254	233	+21	96
6	Utah Hockey Club	82	38	31	13	30	241	251	−10	89
7	Nashville Predators	82	30	44	8	24	214	274	−60	68
8	Chicago Blackhawks	82	25	46	11	20	226	296	−70	61

Source: National Hockey League
Rules for classification: 1) Fewer number of games played (GP, only during regular season); 2) Greater number of regulation wins (RW); 3) Greater number of wins in regulation and overtime, excluding shootout wins (ROW); 4) Greater number of total wins, including shootouts (W); 5) Greater number of points earned in head-to-head play; if teams played an uneven number of head-to-head games, the result of the first game on the home ice of the team with the extra home game is discarded; 6) Greater goal differential (GD); 7) Greater number of goals scored (GF)
p – Clinched Presidents' Trophy; x – Clinched playoff spot

=== Conference standings ===
Western Conference Wild Card
Pos	Div	Team	GP	W	L	OTL	RW	GF	GA	GD	Pts
1	CE	x – Minnesota Wild	82	45	30	7	33	228	239	−11	97
2	CE	x – St. Louis Blues	82	44	30	8	32	254	233	+21	96
3	PA	Calgary Flames	82	41	27	14	31	225	238	−13	96
4	PA	Vancouver Canucks	82	38	30	14	28	236	253	−17	90
5	CE	Utah Hockey Club	82	38	31	13	30	241	251	−10	89
6	PA	Anaheim Ducks	82	35	37	10	24	221	263	−42	80
7	PA	Seattle Kraken	82	35	41	6	28	247	265	−18	76
8	CE	Nashville Predators	82	30	44	8	24	214	274	−60	68
9	CE	Chicago Blackhawks	82	25	46	11	20	226	296	−70	61
10	PA	San Jose Sharks	82	20	50	12	14	210	315	−105	52

Source: National Hockey League
Rules for classification: 1) Fewer number of games played (GP, only during regular season); 2) Greater number of regulation wins (RW); 3) Greater number of wins in regulation and overtime, excluding shootout wins (ROW); 4) Greater number of total wins, including shootouts (W); 5) Greater number of points earned in head-to-head play; if teams played an uneven number of head-to-head games, the result of the first game on the home ice of the team with the extra home game is discarded; 6) Greater goal differential (GD); 7) Greater number of goals scored (GF)
x – Clinched playoff spot

== Schedule and results ==
=== Preseason ===
The preseason schedule was released on June 24, 2024.

2024–25 Minnesota Wild preseason
2024 preseason game log: 5–1–0 (Home: 2–1–0; Road: 3–0–0)

#	Date	Visitor	Score	Home	OT	Location	Attendance	Record
1	September 21	Minnesota	5–2	Winnipeg		Canada Life Centre	13,787	1–0–0
2	September 25	Minnesota	2–5	Dallas		American Airlines Center	14,311	2–0–0
3	September 27	Winnipeg	5–8	Minnesota		Xcel Energy Center	16,560	3–0–0
4	September 29	Dallas	4–2	Minnesota		Xcel Energy Center	17,373	3–1–0
5	October 1	Chicago	2–7	Minnesota		Xcel Energy Center	16,873	4–1–0
6	October 4	Minnesota	6–1	Chicago		United Center	10,292	5–1–0

Legend

Win Loss OT/SO Loss

=== Regular season ===
The regular season schedule was released on July 2, 2024.

2024–25 game log

October: 6–1–2 (Home: 1–0–1; Road: 5–1–1)
#	Date	Visitor	Score	Home	OT	Decision	Attendance	Record	Pts	Recap
1	October 10	Columbus	2–3	Minnesota		Gustavsson	18,613	1–0–0	2
2	October 12	Seattle	5–4	Minnesota	SO	Fleury	18,421	1–0–1	3
3	October 13	Minnesota	1–2	Winnipeg	OT	Gustavsson	12,916	1–0–2	4
4	October 15	Minnesota	4–1	St. Louis		Gustavsson	18,096	2–0–2	6
5	October 19	Minnesota	3–1	Columbus		Gustavsson	16,876	3–0–2	8
6	October 22	Minnesota	5–1	Florida		Gustavsson	18,264	4–0–2	10
7	October 24	Minnesota	4–2	Tampa Bay		Fleury	19,092	5–0–2	12
8	October 26	Minnesota	5–7	Philadelphia		Gustavsson	18,238	5–1–2	12
9	October 29	Minnesota	5–3	Pittsburgh		Fleury	18,195	6–1–2	14

November: 10–3–2 (Home: 5–3–0; Road: 5–0–2)
#	Date	Visitor	Score	Home	OT	Decision	Attendance	Record	Pts	Recap
10	November 1	Tampa Bay	3–5	Minnesota		Gustavsson	18,104	7–1–2	16
11	November 3	Toronto	1–2	Minnesota	OT	Gustavsson	18,096	8–1–2	18
12	November 5	Los Angeles	5–1	Minnesota		Gustavsson	17,617	8–2–2	18
13	November 7	Minnesota	5–2	San Jose		Fleury	10,526	9–2–2	20
14	November 8	Minnesota	5–2	Anaheim		Gustavsson	14,706	10–2–2	22
15	November 10	Minnesota	1–2	Chicago	OT	Gustavsson	19,657	10–2–3	23
16	November 14	Montreal	0–3	Minnesota		Gustavsson	17,012	11–2–3	25
17	November 16	Dallas	2–1	Minnesota		Gustavsson	18,143	11–3–3	25
18	November 19	Minnesota	4–2	St. Louis		Gustavsson	16,463	12–3–3	27
19	November 21	Minnesota	5–3	Edmonton		Fleury	18,347	13–3–3	29
20	November 23	Minnesota	3–4	Calgary	SO	Gustavsson	17,116	13–3–4	30
21	November 25	Winnipeg	4–1	Minnesota		Gustavsson	17,686	13–4–4	30
22	November 27	Minnesota	1–0	Buffalo		Gustavsson	17,326	14–4–4	32
23	November 29	Chicago	2–3	Minnesota		Fleury	18,532	15–4–4	34
24	November 30	Nashville	2–3	Minnesota	OT	Gustavsson	19,064	16–4–4	36

December: 7–7–0 (Home: 4–5–0; Road: 3–2–0)
#	Date	Visitor	Score	Home	OT	Decision	Attendance	Record	Pts	Recap
25	December 3	Vancouver	2–3	Minnesota	OT	Gustavsson	18,076	17–4–4	38
26	December 6	Minnesota	5–1	Anaheim		Gustavsson	15,171	18–4–4	40
27	December 7	Minnesota	1–4	Los Angeles		Fleury	18,145	18–5–4	40
28	December 10	Minnesota	5–4	Utah	SO	Gustavsson	11,131	19–5–4	42
29	December 12	Edmonton	7–1	Minnesota		Gustavsson	18,394	19–6–4	42
30	December 14	Philadelphia	1–4	Minnesota		Fleury	18,076	20–6–4	44
31	December 15	Vegas	3–2	Minnesota		Wallstedt	18,771	20–7–4	44
32	December 18	Florida	6–1	Minnesota		Fleury	17,423	20–8–4	44
33	December 20	Utah	2–1	Minnesota		Fleury	18,088	20–9–4	44
34	December 21	Minnesota	0–5	Winnipeg		Wallsedt	15,225	20–10–4	44
35	December 23	Chicago	3–4	Minnesota		Gustavsson	19,067	21–10–4	46
36	December 27	Minnesota	3–2	Dallas	OT	Gustavsson	18,532	22–10–4	48
37	December 29	Ottawa	3–1	Minnesota		Gustavsson	18,989	22–11–4	48
38	December 31	Nashville	3–5	Minnesota		Gustavsson	19,145	23–11–4	50

January: 8–6–0 (Home: 1–4–0; Road: 7–2–0)
#	Date	Visitor	Score	Home	OT	Decision	Attendance	Record	Pts	Recap
39	January 2	Minnesota	4–3	Washington	SO	Fleury	18,573	24–11–4	52
40	January 4	Minnesota	4–0	Carolina		Gustavsson	18,891	25–11–4	54
41	January 7	St. Louis	4–6	Minnesota		Fleury	18,464	26–11–4	56
42	January 9	Colorado	6–1	Minnesota		Gustavsson	18,979	26–12–4	56
43	January 11	Minnesota	3–1	San Jose		Fleury	17,435	27–12–4	58
44	January 12	Minnesota	1–4	Vegas		Gustavsson	17,921	27–13–4	58
45	January 15	Edmonton	5–3	Minnesota		Gustavsson	18,212	27–14–4	58
46	January 18	Minnesota	2–6	Nashville		Fleury	17,615	27–15–4	58
47	January 20	Minnesota	3–1	Colorado		Fleury	18,072	28–15–4	60
48	January 23	Utah	4–0	Minnesota		Gustavsson	18,071	28–16–4	60
49	January 25	Calgary	5–4	Minnesota		Fleury	19,212	28–17–4	60
50	January 26	Minnesota	4–2	Chicago		Gustavsson	18,701	29–17–4	62
51	January 29	Minnesota	3–1	Toronto		Gustavsson	18,544	30–17–4	64
52	January 30	Minnesota	4–0	Montreal		Fleury	21,105	31–17–4	66

February: 3–5–0 (Home: 2–1–0; Road: 1–4–0)
#	Date	Visitor	Score	Home	OT	Decision	Attendance	Record	Pts	Recap
53	February 1	Minnesota	0–6	Ottawa		Gustavsson	18,822	31–18–4	66
54	February 4	Minnesota	0–3	Boston		Fleury	17,850	31–19–4	66
55	February 6	Carolina	1–2	Minnesota		Gustavsson	18,273	32–19–4	68
56	February 8	NY Islanders	3–6	Minnesota		Gustavsson	18,539	33–19–4	70
57	February 22	Minnesota	4–3	Detroit	OT	Fleury	19,515	34–19–4	72
58	February 25	Detroit	3–2	Minnesota		Gustavsson	18,618	34–20–4	72
59	February 27	Minnesota	1–6	Utah		Fleury	11,131	34–21–4	72
60	February 28	Minnesota	2–5	Colorado		Gustavsson	18,091	34–22–4	72

March: 7–6–2 (Home: 6–4–1; Road: 1–2–1)
#	Date	Visitor	Score	Home	OT	Decision	Attendance	Record	Pts	Recap
61	March 2	Boston	0–1	Minnesota		Gustavsson	18,447	35–22–4	74
62	March 4	Minnesota	4–3	Seattle		Gustavsson	17,151	36–22–4	76
63	March 7	Minnesota	3–1	Vancouver		Gustavsson	18,885	36–23–4	76
64	March 9	Pittsburgh	3–1	Minnesota		Fleury	18,717	36–24–4	76
65	March 11	Colorado	1–2	Minnesota	SO	Gustavsson	18,901	37–24–4	78
66	March 13	NY Rangers	3–2	Minnesota	OT	Gustavsson	18,976	37–24–5	79
67	March 15	St. Louis	5–1	Minnesota		Gustavsson	18,568	37–25–5	79
68	March 17	Los Angeles	1–3	Minnesota		Gustavsson	18,033	38–25–5	81
69	March 19	Seattle	0–4	Minnesota		Gustavsson	17,579	39–25–5	83
70	March 22	Buffalo	1–4	Minnesota		Gustavsson	18,379	40–25–5	85
71	March 24	Minnesota	0–3	Dallas		Gustavsson	18,532	40–26–5	85
72	March 25	Vegas	5–1	Minnesota		Fleury	17,734	40–27–5	85
73	March 27	Washington	2–4	Minnesota		Gustavsson	19,108	41–27–5	87
74	March 29	New Jersey	5–2	Minnesota		Gustavsson	19,265	41–28–5	87
75	March 31	Minnesota	2–3	New Jersey	SO	Gustavsson	15,468	41–28–6	88

April: 4–2–1 (Home: 3–0–0; Road: 1–2–1)
#	Date	Visitor	Score	Home	OT	Decision	Attendance	Record	Pts	Recap
76	April 2	Minnesota	4–5	NY Rangers	OT	Gustavsson	17,492	41–28–7	89
77	April 4	Minnesota	1–3	NY Islanders		Gustavsson	15,742	41–29–7	89
78	April 6	Dallas	2–3	Minnesota	OT	Gustavsson	18,548	42–29–7	91
79	April 9	San Jose	7–8	Minnesota	OT	Fleury	18,675	43–29–7	93
80	April 11	Minnesota	2–4	Calgary		Gustavsson	18,566	43–30–7	93
81	April 12	Minnesota	3–2	Vancouver	OT	Gustavsson	18,844	44–30–7	95
82	April 15	Anaheim	2–3	Minnesota	OT	Fleury	19,029	45–30–7	97

Legend: Win (2 points) Loss (0 points) Overtime/shootout loss (1 point)

=== Playoffs ===
2025 Stanley Cup playoffs

Western Conference first round vs. (P1) Vegas Golden Knights: Vegas won 4–2
#	Date	Visitor	Score	Home	OT	Decision	Attendance	Series	Recap
1	April 20	Minnesota	2–4	Vegas		Gustavsson	18,016	0–1
2	April 22	Minnesota	5–2	Vegas		Gustavsson	18,311	1–1
3	April 24	Vegas	2–5	Minnesota		Gustavsson	19,058	2–1
4	April 26	Vegas	4–3	Minnesota	OT	Gustavsson	19,324	2–2
5	April 29	Minnesota	2–3	Vegas	OT	Fleury	18,441	2–3
6	May 1	Vegas	3–2	Minnesota		Gustavsson	19,047	2–4

Legend: Win Loss

== Transactions ==
The Wild have been involved in the following transactions during the 2024–25 season.

Key:

† Contract is entry-level.
‡ Contract initially takes effect in the 2025–26 season.

=== Trades ===
Date	Details		Ref
June 29, 2024	To Boston Bruins Vinni Lettieri; 4th-round pick in 2024	To Minnesota Wild Jakub Lauko; 4th-round pick in 2024	
November 30, 2024	To Columbus Blue Jackets Daemon Hunt conditional 1st-round pick in 2025 or 1st-round pick in 2026^{1} COL 3rd-round pick in 2026; TOR 4th-round pick in 2026; 2nd-round pick in 2027	To Minnesota Wild David Jiricek; 5th-round pick in 2025	
February 3, 2025	To Utah Hockey Club Sammy Walker	To Minnesota Wild Future considerations	
March 1, 2024	To Nashville Predators 2nd-round pick in 2026	To Minnesota Wild Gustav Nyquist^{2}	

Notes

1. This pick is top five protected, Columbus will receive a first-round pick in 2025 if Minnesota's first-round pick is outside the top five. If Minnesota's first-round pick is inside the top five then Columbus will receive a first-round pick in 2026.
2. Nashville retains 50% of Nyqvist's remaining contract.

=== Players acquired ===
Date	Player	Former team	Term	Via	Ref
July 1, 2024	Travis Boyd	Utah Hockey Club	1-year	Free agency	
July 1, 2024	Joseph Cecconi	Buffalo Sabres	1-year	Free agency	
July 1, 2024	Cameron Crotty	Utah Hockey Club	1-year	Free agency	
July 1, 2024	Brendan Gaunce	Columbus Blue Jackets	2-year	Free agency	
July 1, 2024	Troy Grosenick	Nashville Predators	1-year	Free agency	
July 1, 2024	Reese Johnson	Chicago Blackhawks	1-year	Free agency	
July 1, 2024	Ben Jones	Calgary Flames	2-year	Free agency	
July 1, 2024	Devin Shore	Seattle Kraken	1-year	Free agency	
July 1, 2024	Yakov Trenin	Colorado Avalanche	4-year	Free agency	
December 13, 2024	Travis Dermott	Edmonton Oilers		Waivers	
February 5, 2025	Vinnie Hinostroza	Nashville Predators		Waivers	

=== Players lost ===
Date	Player	New team	Term	Via	Ref
July 1, 2024	Jake Lucchini	Nashville Predators	2-year	Free agency	
July 2, 2024	Dakota Mermis	Toronto Maple Leafs	1-year	Free agency	
July 3, 2024	Mason Shaw	Winnipeg Jets	1-year	Free agency	

=== Signings ===
Date	Player	Term	Ref
July 2, 2024	Jacob Middleton	4-year‡	
July 9, 2024	Declan Chisholm	1-year	
July 9, 2024	Adam Raska	1-year	
July 11, 2024	Sammy Walker	1-year	
July 23, 2024	Graeme Clarke	1-year	
July 29, 2024	Brock Faber	8-year‡	

== Draft picks ==
Below are the Minnesota Wild selections at the 2024 NHL entry draft, which was held on June 28 and 29, 2024, at the Sphere in Paradise, Nevada.

Round	#	Player	Pos	Nationality	College/Junior/Club team (League)
1	12	Zeev Buium	D	United States	Denver Pioneers (NCHC)
2	45	Ryder Ritchie	RW	Canada	Prince Albert Raiders (WHL)
4	122	Aron Kiviharju	D	Finland	HIFK (Liiga)
5	140	Sebastian Soini	D	Finland	Ilves (U20 SM-sarja)
5	142	Chase Wutzke	G	Canada	Red Deer Rebels (WHL)
6	174	Stevie Leskovar	D	Canada	Mississauga Steelheads (OHL)
