= Jim Reeder =

American baseball player and coach (1925–1972)

James Bartlett Reeder (1925–1972) was an Ohio State University All-American who was a member of the 1943 Big Ten championship baseball team. Reeder was named a charter member of the California State University Hall of Fame at the same time as tennis great, Billie Jean King. The baseball field at California State University, Los Angeles bears Jim Reeder's name.

At Ohio State, Jim Reeder lettered in three varsity sports: football, basketball, and baseball. His athletic and academic career was interrupted by World War II, as was the case with one of his college buddies and fellow baseball players, Keo Nakama. Serving a four-year-stint as a machine gunner for the Marines in World War II, Jim Reeder earned the Purple Heart and Bronze Star. At the end of World War II, Reeder earned his B.S. degree from O.S.U. and later his M.S. from Indiana University in 1953. He taught and coached in Oberlin, Ohio, and Ypsilanti, Michigan. He mentored countless young men during his years as a coach, including American Football Coach Jim Young (Purdue, Army).

In 1955, Reeder moved his family west to Los Angeles where he became the baseball coach for the then fledgling California State University, Los Angeles. He remained Cal State's head coach and assisted major league baseball teams with scouting until his untimely death at the age of 47 in January, 1972. He coached seven All-Americans during his short life and never had a losing season at Cal State L.A.. At the time of his death, the university renamed the baseball field the Jim Reeder Memorial Field. When the field was being built, Coach Reeder used his knowledge of and familiarity with professional baseball fields to assist in the design of this field, and to this day, descriptions of Reeder Field include the fact that it is considered to be unique among college baseball fields. Upon entering the field, visitors will see a bronze plaque with a likeness of Coach Reeder with the Shakespearean quote from Julius Caesar: "Say to all the world, This was a man!"

Jim Reeder grew up in Columbus, Ohio, the middle of three sons born to Faye Bartlett Reeder, Phd., a member of D.A.R..

Plaque honoring Coach Jim Reeder for whom Cal State L.A.'s baseball field is named.
