= Oskar Bäck =

Swedish ice hockey player (born 2000)

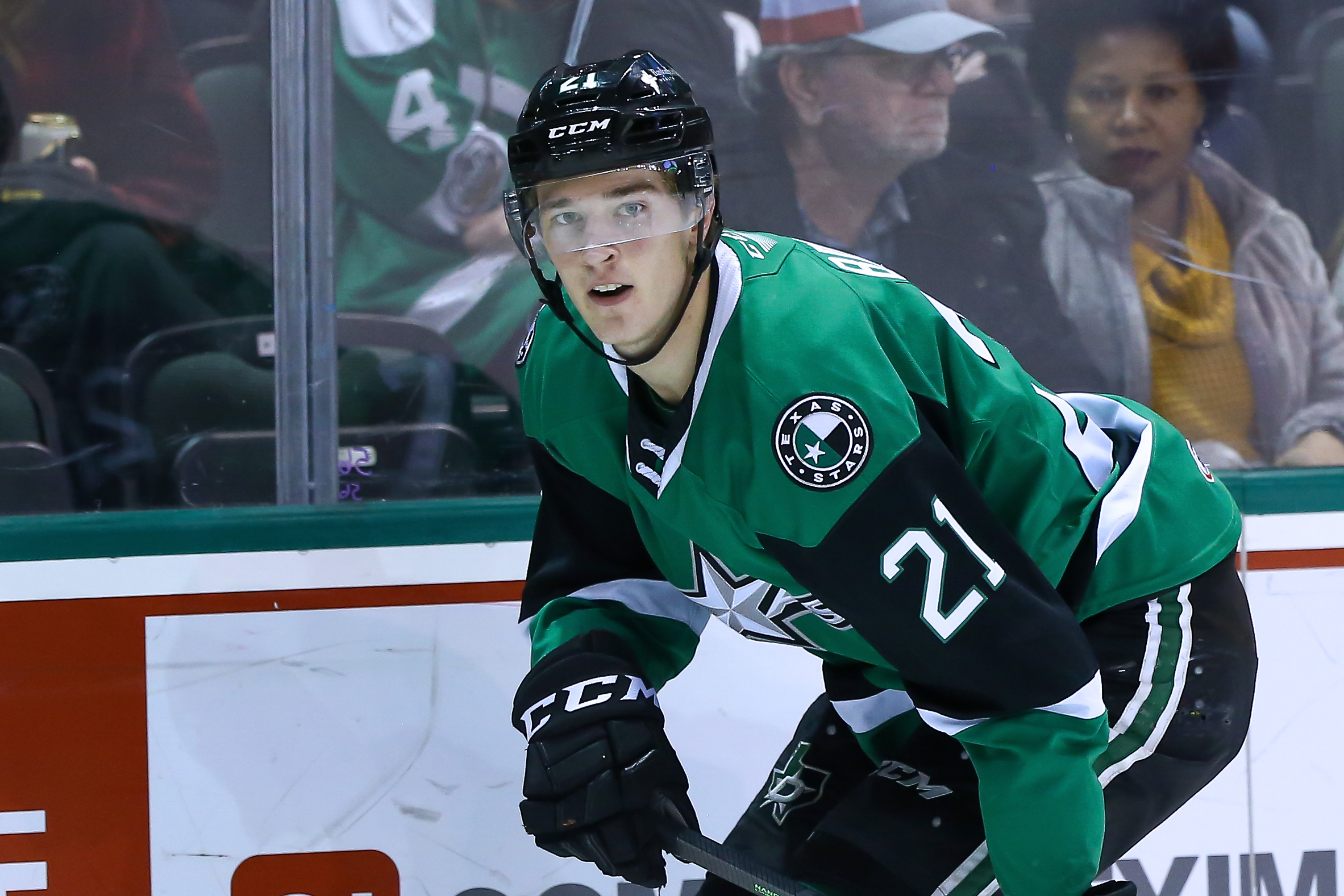
- Bäck with the Texas Stars in 2022
- Born: 12 March 2000 (age 26) Karlstad, Sweden
- Height: 6 ft 4 in (193 cm)
- Weight: 207 lb (94 kg; 14 st 11 lb)
- Position: Forward
- Shoots: Left
- NHL team Former teams: Dallas Stars; Färjestad BK BIK Karlskoga Texas Stars
- NHL draft: 75th overall, 2018; Dallas Stars
- Playing career: 2017–present

Oskar Bäck (born 12 March 2000) is a Swedish professional ice hockey player who is a forward for the Dallas Stars of the National Hockey League (NHL). Bäck was drafted in the third round, 75th overall, by the Stars in the 2018 NHL entry draft.

== Playing career ==
Bäck made his Swedish Hockey League (SHL) debut playing for Färjestad BK in 2017, playing in 14 games in the 2017–18 season.

On 9 May 2018, Bäck was signed to continue his development with BIK Karlskoga of the HockeyAllsvenskan for the duration of the 2018–19 season. Receiving heavier minutes and responsibilities, Bäck registered 16 assists and 20 points in 45 regular season games. Following BIK Karlskoga's qualification series, Bäck returned to SHL club, Färjestad BK. On 7 April 2020, Bäck was re-signed to a one-year contract by Färjestad BK.

On 21 April 2021, Bäck was signed by draft club, the Dallas Stars, to a three-year, entry-level contract. After signing an NHL contract, Bäck spent the next three seasons in the American Hockey League (AHL) playing for the Texas Stars, Dallas' AHL affiliate.

On 25 June 2024, the Stars re-signed Bäck to a one-year, two-way contract. Bäck made his NHL debut on 10 October, in a 4–3 win over the Nashville Predators. On 17 October, he recorded his first NHL point, an assist, in a 3–2 loss to the Washington Capitals. On 14 November, Bäck scored his first NHL goal and added an assist in a 7–2 win against the Boston Bruins.

== Career statistics ==
=== Regular season and playoffs ===
			Regular season					Playoffs
Season	Team	League	GP	G	A	Pts	PIM	GP	G	A	Pts	PIM
2015–16	Färjestad BK	J20	6	0	1	1	0	—	—	—	—	—
2016–17	Färjestad BK	J20	25	3	8	11	8	2	0	1	1	0
2017–18	Färjestad BK	J20	38	10	22	32	4	3	1	1	2	2
2017–18	Färjestad BK	SHL	14	0	0	0	0	—	—	—	—	—
2018–19	BIK Karlskoga	Allsv	45	4	16	20	6	5	0	3	3	0
2019–20	Färjestad BK	SHL	47	2	7	9	0	—	—	—	—	—
2020–21	Färjestad BK	SHL	52	4	10	14	6	6	1	0	1	0
2021–22	Texas Stars	AHL	71	7	18	25	8	2	0	0	0	2
2022–23	Texas Stars	AHL	66	5	22	27	6	8	2	3	5	0
2023–24	Texas Stars	AHL	59	7	29	36	12	7	2	3	5	4
2024–25	Dallas Stars	NHL	73	4	12	16	8	11	0	2	2	2
2025–26	Dallas Stars	NHL	72	5	7	12	10	6	0	1	1	0
SHL totals			113	6	17	23	6	6	1	0	1	0
NHL totals			145	9	19	28	18	17	0	3	3	2

=== International ===
Medal record

Men's ice hockey

Representing Sweden

World Junior Championships
Bronze medal – third place	2020 Czech Republic	

World U18 Championship
Bronze medal – third place	2018 Russia	

Year	Team	Event	Result	GP	G	A	Pts	PIM
2016	Sweden	U17	1st place, gold medalist(s)	6	0	5	5	0
2017	Sweden	U18	4th	7	1	0	1	2
2017	Sweden	IH18	3rd place, bronze medalist(s)	5	0	1	1	2
2018	Sweden	U18	3rd place, bronze medalist(s)	7	1	3	4	2
2019	Sweden	WJC	5th	5	0	1	1	2
2020	Sweden	WJC	3rd place, bronze medalist(s)	7	1	1	2	0
Junior totals				37	3	11	14	8

== Playing style ==
Bäck is primarily characterised as a two-way centre who has been deployed in defensive and checking roles during his professional development. The Dallas Stars' player profile describes him as a "defense-first forward" who earned trust in defensive situations while transitioning from the AHL to the NHL.

During his tenure with the Texas Stars, Bäck's usage included penalty-killing assignments and other defensive deployments; Dallas team materials note his role on the penalty kill and his steady minutes in short-handed situations during his NHL rookie campaign.

Offensively, Bäck showed progressive improvement at the AHL level, culminating in a career-high 36 points (7 goals, 29 assists) in 59 games during the 2023–24 season; this statistical development preceded his establishment on the Stars' NHL roster.

Overall, Bäck's combination of size, defensive zone responsibility, and developing playmaking ability have led clubs and analysts to project him as a bottom-six NHL centre with special-teams utility, particularly for penalty-killing and defensive matchups.
