= Adam Wilsby =

Swedish ice hockey player (born 2000)

- Born: 7 August 2000 (age 26) Stockholm, Sweden
- Height: 6 ft 0 in (183 cm)
- Weight: 183 lb (83 kg; 13 st 1 lb)
- Position: Defence
- Shoots: Left
- NHL team Former teams: Nashville Predators; Skellefteå AIK
- NHL draft: 101st overall, 2020; Nashville Predators
- Playing career: 2019–present

Adam Wilsby (born 7 August 2000) is a Swedish professional ice hockey player who is a defenceman for the Nashville Predators of the National Hockey League (NHL). Wilsby was drafted by the Predators in the fourth round of the 2020 NHL entry draft with the 101st overall pick.

Wilsby made his NHL debut for the Predators on November 27, 2024, against the Flyers in Nashville, and scored his first NHL goal on December 17, 2024, also in Nashville against the Rangers. He played in 23 NHL games in the 2024-25 season before having season-ending surgery, and made the Preds' opening night roster in 2025-26.

== Playing career ==
While playing professionally with Skellefteå AIK of the Swedish Hockey League (SHL), he was signed to a two-year, entry-level contract with the Predators on 14 April 2022.

Wilsby made his NHL debut for the Predators on November 27, 2024, against the Flyers in Nashville, and scored his first NHL goal on December 17, 2024, also in Nashville against the Rangers. He played 23 games in the 2024-25 season, posting one goal and four assists before having season-ending surgery in February shortly after signing a contract extension with the Predators.

Wilsby made the Predators opening night roster to begin the following season in October 2025, and registered his first career multi-point game with two assists in Toronto against the Maple Leafs on October 14, 2025.

== Career statistics ==
			Regular season					Playoffs
Season	Team	League	GP	G	A	Pts	PIM	GP	G	A	Pts	PIM
2016–17	Skellefteå AIK	J20	12	0	1	1	4	—	—	—	—	—
2017–18	Skellefteå AIK	J20	39	1	6	7	12	3	0	0	0	0
2018–19	Skellefteå AIK	J20	38	4	25	29	18	—	—	—	—	—
2018–19	Skellefteå AIK	SHL	9	0	0	0	2	2	0	0	0	0
2019–20	Skellefteå AIK	J20	13	6	8	14	12	—	—	—	—	—
2019–20	Skellefteå AIK	SHL	1	0	1	1	0	—	—	—	—	—
2019–20	Södertälje SK	Allsv	41	3	27	30	26	1	0	0	0	0
2020–21	Skellefteå AIK	SHL	48	6	12	18	18	12	0	2	2	2
2021–22	Skellefteå AIK	SHL	51	4	13	17	28	6	0	2	2	0
2021–22	Milwaukee Admirals	AHL	—	—	—	—	—	3	0	0	0	2
2022–23	Milwaukee Admirals	AHL	72	1	17	18	32	16	2	6	8	8
2023–24	Milwaukee Admirals	AHL	61	8	13	21	20	15	0	3	3	6
2024–25	Milwaukee Admirals	AHL	13	1	4	5	10	—	—	—	—	—
2024–25	Nashville Predators	NHL	23	1	4	5	6	—	—	—	—	—
2025–26	Nashville Predators	NHL	58	1	15	16	29	—	—	—	—	—
SHL totals			109	10	26	36	48	20	0	4	4	2
NHL totals			81	2	19	21	35	—	—	—	—	—
