= 2024–25 Tampa Bay Lightning season =

National Hockey League season

2024–25 Tampa Bay Lightning
- Division: 2nd Atlantic
- Conference: 3rd Eastern
- 2024–25 record: 47–27–8
- Home record: 29–8–4
- Road record: 18–19–4
- Goals for: 294
- Goals against: 219

Team information
- General manager: Julien BriseBois
- Coach: Jon Cooper
- Captain: Victor Hedman
- Alternate captains: Nikita Kucherov; Ryan McDonagh
- Arena: Amalie Arena
- Average attendance: 19,092
- Minor league affiliates: Syracuse Crunch (AHL); Orlando Solar Bears (ECHL)

Team leaders
- Goals: Brayden Point (42)
- Assists: Nikita Kucherov (84)
- Points: Nikita Kucherov (121)
- Penalty minutes: Emil Lilleberg (99)
- Plus/minus: Ryan McDonagh (+42)
- Wins: Andrei Vasilevskiy (37)
- Goals against average: Andrei Vasilevskiy (2.14)

The 2024–25 Tampa Bay Lightning season was the 33rd season for the National Hockey League (NHL) franchise that was established on December 16, 1991. This was their first season since 2007–08 without franchise icon Steven Stamkos, as he signed with the Nashville Predators in free agency in the 2024 off-season.

On April 5, the Lightning clinched a playoff berth for the eighth consecutive season following a loss by the New York Rangers to the New Jersey Devils.

In the first round of the 2025 playoffs, the Lightning were defeated by their intrastate rival, the reigning and eventual Stanley Cup champion Florida Panthers in five games for the second season in a row.

== Off-season ==
=== April ===
The Lightning's off-season began after losing to the Florida Panthers in the first round of the Stanley Cup playoffs in five games.

=== May ===
On May 16, 2024, the Lightning re-signed forward Mitchell Chaffee two-year contract extension that has an annual cap hit of $800k. Chaffee skated in 30 games with the Lightning this past season, recording 4 goals and 7 points. Chaffee also appeared in all five of the Lightning's playoff games in the first round series with the Florida Panthers.

The following day the Lightning re-signed forward Niko Huuhtanen to a three-year entry-level contract. Niko has played the last two seasons with Jukurit of the Liiga. Niko has recorded 36 goals and 40 assists over 100 games. He was also named the Liiga's top rookie during the 2022–23 season. This past season he also appeared in six games with the Syracuse Crunch of the American Hockey League on an ATO, recording 3 assists over 6 games.

On May 21, 2024, the Lightning reacquired Ryan McDonagh and a 4th-round pick in the 2024 NHL entry draft from the Nashville Predators in exchange for 7th-round pick in 2024, and a 2nd-round pick in the 2025 NHL entry draft. McDonagh was previously traded to the Predators after winning back-to-back championships with the Lightning and helping them reach a third straight Stanley Cup Final due to cap constraints. In the prior season McDonagh appeared in 74 games, recording 29 assists. McDonagh has two years remaining on his contract and will carry a cap hit of $6.75 million.

On May 25, 2024, the Lightning placed forward prospect Ilya Usau on unconditional waivers for purposes of mutual contract termination. Usau appeared in 42 games with the Syracuse Crunch last season, recording 7 goals and 14 points. The prior season he had 4 goals and 16 points over 57 games with the Crunch. The following day Usua cleared waivers and had his contract terminated with the team.

=== June ===
On June 6, 2024, the Lightning re-signed defenseman Declan Carlile to a two-year contract extension. Carlile made his NHL debut last season in a game against the Minnesota Wild. The majority of the season was spent with the Crunch. Carlile skated in 61 games, recording 7 goals and 27 points.

On June 10, 2024, Lightning forward Waltteri Merela signed a one-year contract with SC Bern of the National League in Switzerland. Merela appeared in 19 games with the Lightning, recording one goal. Merela also skated in 55 games with the Crunch, recording 15 goals and 34 points. Merela still could be issued a qualifying offer if the team wishes to retain his rights since he is a restricted free agent.

On June 17, 2024, the Lightning re-signed forward Gabriel Fortier to a one-year contract extension. Fortier has appeared in 11 games with the Lightning since being drafted in 2018. Fortier has primarily appeared with the Syracuse Crunch thus far in his career. He skated in 62 games, recording 13 goals and 26 points this past season. Overall he has appeared in 235 games with the Crunch, posting 44 goals and 100 points.

On June 21, 2024, the Lightning re-signed forward Gage Goncalves to a one-year contract extension. Goncalves made two appearances with the Lightning this past season. Goncavles also appeared in 69 games with the Syracuse Crunch, recording 13 goals and 58 points.

On June 29, 2024, the Lightning traded defenseman Mikhail Sergachev to the Utah Hockey Club in exchange for defenseman J.J. Moser, center prospect Conor Geekie, a 2nd-round pick in the 2025 NHL entry draft and a 7th-round pick in the 2024 NHL entry draft. Sergachev appeared 34 games, recording 19 points, prior to missing the remainder of the regular season due to injury. Sergachev was originally acquired by the Lightning from the Montreal Canadiens in 2017. Sergachev played 7-seasons with the team, recording 48 goals and 257 points. Sergachev played in 100 playoff games and helped the team win back-to-back championships in 2020 and 2021. Sergachev finishes his tenure with the team second amongst defensemen in assists (209), points (257) and blocked shots (670).

The same day, the Lightning also traded forward Tanner Jeannot to the Los Angeles Kings in exchange for a 2nd-round pick in 2025 and a 4th-round pick in 2024. Jeannot skated in 55 games with the Lightning this past season, recording 14 points.

On June 30, 2024, the Lightning traded a 3rd-round draft pick to the Carolina Hurricanes in exchange for the negotiating rights to forward Jake Guentzel. Guentzel recorded 30 goals last season between his time with the Hurricanes and the Pittsburgh Penguins. This was Guentzel's fourth time reaching the 30 goal mark, which includes him hitting 40 goals twice.

The Lightning also made another trade this day. The Lightning traded forward Bennett MacArthur to the Penguins for Lukas Svejkovsky. Svejkovsky split time the past two seasons between the Wilkes-Barre/Scranton Penguins of the American Hockey League and the Wheeling Nailers of the ECHL. Svejkovsky comes into the upcoming season on the last year of his three-year entry-level contract.

=== July ===
On July 1, 2024, the Lightning reached an agreement with forward Jake Guentzel prior to the start of free agency. Guentzel agreed to a 7-year contract that carries a cap hit of $9m a season. Guentzel was considered to be one of the more coveted forwards heading into the free agency period.

The Lightning were involved in following player signings on the first day of free agency.

The Lightning signed defensemen Tobie Paquette-Bisson to a one-year contract. Paquette-Bisson played in 69 games with Laval Rocket the past season. In that stretch he recorded 27 points. Paquette-Bisson has recorded 69 points over 214 games in the AHL. He also has skated in 132 ECHL games, recording 50 points.

The Lightning signed defenseman Derrick Pouliot to a one-year contract. This past season Pouliot appeared in 64 games with the Texas Stars, recording 9 goals and 37 assists for 46 points. Pouliot also played in 5 games with the Dallas Stars. Pouliot has appeared in 226 NHL career games across his career thus far.

The Lightning signed defensemen Steven Santini to a one-year contract. Santini spent the past season with the Ontario Reign. Santini recorded 5 goals and 15 assists in his time with the Reign. Santini previously has suited up in games with the New Jersey Devils, St. Louis Blues and Nashville Predators.

The Lightning signed forward Jesse Ylonen to a one-year contract. The contract will carry a cap hit of $775k at the NHL level. Ylonen appeared in 59 games with the Montreal Canadiens, recording 4 goals and 4 assists. Ylonen was originally second-round pick of the Canadiens in 2018. Over his career he has appeared in 111 games with the Canadiens, recording 12 goals and 17 assists.

The Lightning signed forward Zemgus Girgensons to a three-year contract that carries an annual cap hit of $2.55M. Girgensons had spent his entire career playing with the Buffalo Sabres. Over that time Girgensons appeared in 688 games with the Sabres, recording 188 points.

The biggest news of the day was that longtime captain and franchise icon Steven Stamkos left the organization as a free agent to sign with the Nashville Predators after he and the Lightning were unable to negotiate an extension. Stamkos signed a four-year contract that carries a cap hit of $8M a season. Stamkos was originally drafted by the Lightning first overall in the 2008 NHL entry draft. Stamkos captained the team to back-to-back championships in 2020 and 2021 along with appearances in the Stanley Cup Finals in 2015 and 2022. Stamkos also collected the Maurice "Rocket" Richard Trophy twice (in 2010 and 2012 while also being the runner-up in 2011, 2013 and 2015) and was the Mark Messier Leadership Award recipient in 2023. He was also a finalist for the Hart Memorial Trophy in 2012, a finalist for the Ted Lindsay Award in back-to-back years (in 2011 and 2012) and the runner-up for the Art Ross Trophy in back-to-back years (in 2012 and 2013). Stamkos finishes his Lightning tenure as the team's all-time leader in games played (1,082), goals (555) and points (1,137).

On July 2, 2024, the Lightning signed forward Cam Atkinson to a one-year contract that carries a $900k cap hit. Atkinson became a free agent after the Philadelphia Flyers opted to buy out the remainder of his contract prior to the 2024 NHL entry draft. Atkinson played his first full season after missing the prior season due to a back injury. He skated in 70 games, recording 13 goals and 28 points.

The same day the Lightning extended two members of their defensive core. First, the Lightning re-signed Victor Hedman to a four-year contract extension that will carry a $8M cap hit when it goes into effect the following season. Hedman joined the Lightning after being drafted second overall in the 2009 NHL entry draft. Since that time Hedman has helped the Lightning win back-to-back cups in 2020 and 2021. During the 2020 championship, Hedman won the Conn Smythe Trophy as the most valuable player of the Stanley Cup Playoffs. He is only one of eleven defensemen to achieve the feet thus far. Hedman has won the James Norris Memorial Trophy in 2018 and was a six-time finalist and been named to four NHL All Star games. Hedman is also only third player in franchise history to appear in over 1000 games with the team. Hedman holds most of the teams records on defense, which includes games played (1052), goals (156), assists (572) and points (728), plus/minus, even-strength goals, even-strength points, power-play points, shorthanded points, overtime goals, game winning goals, hits and blocked shots.

Second, the Lightning re-signed defenseman Emil Lilleberg to a two-year contract extension that has a cap hit of $800k. Lilleberg made his NHL debut with the Lightning his past season. He recorded five assists in 37 games after making his debut. Lilleberg also appeared in 38 games with the Syracuse Crunch, recording 2 goals and 15 points.

On July 11, 2024, the Lightning reached a two-year contract extension with defenseman J.J. Moser that will carry a $3.375M cap hit. By doing so the Lightning avoid going to salary arbitration with Moser. Moser joined the Lightning in the off season as part of the trade that sent Mikhail Sergachev to Utah. Moser skated in 80 games with the Arizona Coyotes the past season prior to their relocation. Moser recorded 5 goals and 21 assists in that season. Moser also had 16 goals and 56 assists over three seasons with the Coyotes.

== Training camp ==
=== September ===
On September 4, 2024, the Lightning announced their roster for their prospect camp and 2024 NHL Rookie Show Case. The event will take place in Bellevue, Tennessee from the 13th through the 16th. The Lightning's prospects will report to the rookie camp on September 11th. The roster will feature 13 players drafted by the team, players acquired via trade and free agent invitees. The below is the full roster of the prospect camp and rookie show case.

Forwards

Tristan Allard, Dylan Duke, Jaydon Dureau, Lucas Edmonds, Ethan Gauthier, Conor Geekie, Max Groshev, Ethan Hay, Niko Huuhtanen, Kaden Pitre, Milo Roelens, Lukas Svejkovsky and Gabriel Szturc

Defensemen

Max Crozier, Tyson Feist, Dyllan Gill, Jan Golicic, Emil Lilleberg, Roman Schmidt, Scott Walford and Jace Weir

Goaltenders

Ryan Fanti and Harrison Meneghin

On September 16, 2024, the Lightning announced their full training camp roster for the upcoming season. Training camp is scheduled to begin on September 18th. The below is makeup of the camp roster.

Forwards

Luke Glendening, Cam Atkinson, Conor Geekie, Jujhar Khaira, Nick Paul, Brayden Point, Logan Brown, Mikey Eyssimont, Zemgus Girgensons, Jaydon Dureau, Kale Kessy, Milo Roelens, Brandon Hagel, Gabriel Dumont, Mitchell Chaffee, Lukas Svejkovsky, Niko Huuhtanen, Maxim Groshev, Dylan Duke, Lucas Edmonds, Jesse Ylonen, Joel Teasdale, Jake Guentzel, Tristan Allard, Jack Finley, Anthony Cirelli, Conor Sheary, Gabriel Fortier, Kaden Pitre, Daniel Walcott, Nikita Kucherov, Ethan Gauthier, Gage Goncalves, Ethan Hay, Gabriel Szturc and Kyle Chyzowski.

Defensemen

Ryan McDonagh, Jace Weir, Darren Raddysh, Tobie Paquette-Bisson, Scott Walford, Nick Perbix, Derrick Pouliot, Jan Golicic, Dyllan Gill, Steven Santini, Max Crozier, Declan Carlile, Roman Schmidt, Victor Hedman, Emil Lilleberg, Erik Cernak and J.J. Moser.

Goaltenders

Harrison Meneghin, Ryan Fanti, Jonas Johansson, Brandon Halverson, Matt Tomkins and Andrei Vasilevskiy

On September 17, 2024, the Lightning announced that forward Kyle Chyzowski and defenseman Jace Weir had been released from the training camp roster.

Captaincy

On September 20, 2024, the Lightning announced that Victor Hedman had been named the 11th captain in franchise history. Hedman has spent his entire 15-year career with the Lightning prior to being named to the captaincy. Hedman holds the franchise record for defenseman in games played (1,052), points (728), power-play points (14), overtime goals (8), game-winning goals (28), shots on goal (2,241), hits (1,132), block shots (1,613) and takeaways (529). Hedman also has the most time on ice for any skater in franchise history (24,683:30). In addition, Hedman has also won the Conn Smythe Trophy, the Stanley Cup (2X), and James Norris Memorial Trophy. Hedman is joined in the leadership group by Ryan McDonagh and Nikita Kucherov.

On September 25, 2024, the Lightning made their first training camp cuts. The Lightning sent Jan Golicic, Ethan Hay, Kaden Pitre and Harrison Meneghin back to their junior teams.

On September 29, 2024, the Lightning reduced their training camp roster by 18 players. The Lightning reassigned Dylan Duke, Jaydon Dureau, Lucas Edmonds, Dyllan Gill, Niko Huuhtanen, Milo Roelens, Roman Schmidt, Lukas Svejkovsky and Gabriel Szturc to the Syracuse Crunch. Gabriel Dumont, Ryan Fanti, Tyson Feist, Brandon Halverson, Kale Kessey, Jujhar Khaira, Joel Teasdale, Daniel Walcott and Scott Walford were released from their PTOs and were also assigned to Syracuse.

=== October ===
On October 1, 2024, Tobie Paquette-Bisson and Derrick Pouliot cleared waivers and were assigned to the Syracuse Crunch for their training camp.

On October 2, 2024, the Lightning recalled Dylan Duke from Syracuse. The callup was in relation to injuries that the Lightning were experiencing at forward.

On October 3, 2024, Conor Geekie was suspended for one preseason game for violating NHL Rule 70.2. The rule concerns when a player leaves the bench on a legal line change for the purpose of starting an altercation. The suspension was the result of Geekie retaliating for a hit by Florida Panthers forward Josh Davies hitting Victor Hedman. Geekie ended up with 19 total minutes in penalties for the incident.

On October 4, 2024, the Lightning recalled Gabriel Szturc from Syracuse.

That same day the Lightning also played goaltender Matt Tomkins on waivers for purposes of assigning him to Syracuse. Tomkins appeared in six games with the Lightning in the prior season. Tomkins cleared waivers the following day.

On October 6, 2024, the Lightning reduced their training camp roster by nine players. Declan Carlile, Dylan Duke, Gage Goncalves, Maxim Groshev, Steven Santini, Gabriel Szturc, Matt Tomkins, and Jesse Ylonen were all assigned to Syracuse. Ethan Gauthier was assigned to his junior team in the QMJHL.

That same day the Lightning announced that their preseason game against the Nashville Predators at Amalie Arena had been canceled as a result of Hurricane Milton. The game was originally postponed due to the effects of Hurricane Helene.

On October 7, 2024, the Lightning assigned Max Crozier to Syracuse and released Logan Brown from his PTO. It is believed that the Lightning will be signing Brown to an American Hockey League contract to play with the Crunch.

On October 8, 2024, the Lightning announced their opening night roster. The below is the list of forwards, defenseman and goaltenders that will make up the opening night roster.

Forwards

Cam Atkinson, Mitchell Chaffee, Anthony Cirelli, Conor Geekie, Zemgus Girgensons, Jake Guentzel, Brandon Hagel, Nikita Kucherov, Nick Paul, Brayden Point and Conor Sheary.

Defensemen

Erik Cernak, Victor Hedman, Emil Lilleberg, Ryan McDonagh, J.J. Moser, Nick Perbix and Darren Raddysh.

Goaltenders

Andrei Vasilevskiy and Jonas Johansson.

Injured or Non-Roster Players

Mikey Eyssimont, Jack Finley and Gabriel Fortier.

== Standings ==
=== Divisional standings ===
Atlantic Division
Pos	Team	GP	W	L	OTL	RW	GF	GA	GD	Pts
1	y – Toronto Maple Leafs	82	52	26	4	41	268	231	+37	108
2	x – Tampa Bay Lightning	82	47	27	8	41	294	219	+75	102
3	x – Florida Panthers	82	47	31	4	37	252	223	+29	98
4	x – Ottawa Senators	82	45	30	7	35	243	234	+9	97
5	x – Montreal Canadiens	82	40	31	11	30	245	265	−20	91
6	Detroit Red Wings	82	39	35	8	30	238	259	−21	86
7	Buffalo Sabres	82	36	39	7	29	269	289	−20	79
8	Boston Bruins	82	33	39	10	26	222	272	−50	76

Source: National Hockey League
Rules for classification: 1) Fewer number of games played (GP, only during regular season); 2) Greater number of regulation wins (RW); 3) Greater number of wins in regulation and overtime, excluding shootout wins (ROW); 4) Greater number of total wins, including shootouts (W); 5) Greater number of points earned in head-to-head play; if teams played an uneven number of head-to-head games, the result of the first game on the home ice of the team with the extra home game is discarded; 6) Greater goal differential (GD); 7) Greater number of goals scored (GF)
x – Clinched playoff spot; y – Clinched division

=== Conference standings ===
Eastern Conference Wild Card
Pos	Div	Team	GP	W	L	OTL	RW	GF	GA	GD	Pts
1	AT	x – Ottawa Senators	82	45	30	7	35	243	234	+9	97
2	AT	x – Montreal Canadiens	82	40	31	11	30	245	265	−20	91
3	ME	Columbus Blue Jackets	82	40	33	9	30	273	268	+5	89
4	AT	Detroit Red Wings	82	39	35	8	30	238	259	−21	86
5	ME	New York Rangers	82	39	36	7	35	256	255	+1	85
6	ME	New York Islanders	82	35	35	12	28	224	260	−36	82
7	ME	Pittsburgh Penguins	82	34	36	12	24	243	293	−50	80
8	AT	Buffalo Sabres	82	36	39	7	29	269	289	−20	79
9	AT	Boston Bruins	82	33	39	10	26	222	272	−50	76
10	ME	Philadelphia Flyers	82	33	39	10	21	238	286	−48	76

Source: National Hockey League
Rules for classification: 1) Fewer number of games played (GP, only during regular season); 2) Greater number of regulation wins (RW); 3) Greater number of wins in regulation and overtime, excluding shootout wins (ROW); 4) Greater number of total wins, including shootouts (W); 5) Greater number of points earned in head-to-head play; if teams played an uneven number of head-to-head games, the result of the first game on the home ice of the team with the extra home game is discarded; 6) Greater goal differential (GD); 7) Greater number of goals scored (GF)
x – Clinched playoff spot

== Schedule and results ==
=== Preseason ===
2024 preseason game log: 2–2–2 (Home: 1–1–2; Road: 1–1–0)

Game	Date	Opponent	Score	OT	Location	Attendance	Record
1	September 24	Carolina Hurricanes	1–2		Amalie Arena	9,135	0–1–0
2	September 25	Florida Panthers	8–7		Kia Center	15,899	1–1–0
–	September 27	Nashville Predators	Game postponed due to the impending threat from Hurricane Helene. Makeup date: October 7				
3	September 28	@ Nashville Predators	0–6		Bridgestone Arena	17,159	1–2–0
4	September 30	@ Florida Panthers	3–1		Amerant Bank Arena	14,013	2–2–0
5	October 2	Florida Panthers	1–2	OT	Amalie Arena	11,270	2–2–1
6	October 4	@ Carolina Hurricanes	1–2	OT	Lenovo Center	16,005	2–2–2
–	October 7	Nashville Predators	Game cancelled due to the impending threat from Hurricane Milton.				

Lightning score listed first;

Win Loss Overtime/shootout loss

=== Regular season ===
2024–25 game log
October: 7–3–0, 14 points (Home: 4–1–0; Road: 3–2–0)

Game	Date	Opponent	Score	OT	Decision	Location	Attendance	Record	Points	Recap
1	October 11	@ Carolina Hurricanes	4–1		Vasilevskiy	Lenovo Center	18,817	1–0–0	2	
–	October 12	Carolina Hurricanes	Game postponed due to the effects of Hurricane Milton. Makeup date: January 7.							
2	October 15	Vancouver Canucks	4–1		Vasilevskiy	Amalie Arena	19,092	2–0–0	4	
3	October 17	Vegas Golden Knights	4–3		Vasilevskiy	Amalie Arena	19,092	3–0–0	6	
4	October 19	@ Ottawa Senators	4–5		Vasilevskiy	Canadian Tire Centre	16,188	3–1–0	6	
5	October 21	@ Toronto Maple Leafs	2–5		Vasilevskiy	Scotiabank Arena	18,356	3–2–0	6	
6	October 22	@ New Jersey Devils	8–5		Johansson	Prudential Center	15,410	4–2–0	8	
7	October 24	Minnesota Wild	2–4		Vasilevskiy	Amalie Arena	19,092	4–3–0	8	
8	October 26	Washington Capitals	3–0		Vasilevskiy	Amalie Arena	19,092	5–3–0	10	
9	October 28	Nashville Predators	3–2	OT	Vasilevskiy	Amalie Arena	19,092	6–3–0	12	
10	October 30	@ Colorado Avalanche	5–2		Vasilevskiy	Ball Arena	18,019	7–3–0	14	

November: 5–6–2, 12 points (Home: 3–3–1; Road: 2–3–1)

Game	Date	Opponent	Score	OT	Decision	Location	Attendance	Record	Points	Recap
11	November 1	@ Minnesota Wild	3–5		Vasilevskiy	Xcel Energy Center	18,104	7–4–0	14	
12	November 3	@ Winnipeg Jets	4–7		Johansson	Canada Life Centre	12,912	7–5–0	14	
13	November 5	@ St. Louis Blues	2–3		Vasilevskiy	Enterprise Center	17,161	7–6–0	14	
14	November 7	Philadelphia Flyers	1–2	SO	Vasilevskiy	Amalie Arena	19,092	7–6–1	15	
15	November 14	Winnipeg Jets	4–1		Vasilevskiy	Amalie Arena	19,092	8–6–1	17	
16	November 16	New Jersey Devils	4–0		Vasilevskiy	Amalie Arena	19,092	9–6–1	19	
17	November 19	@ Pittsburgh Penguins	3–2	OT	Vasilevskiy	PPG Paints Arena	16,065	10–6–1	21	
18	November 21	@ Columbus Blue Jackets	6–7	OT	Johansson	Nationwide Arena	16,260	10–6–2	22	
19	November 23	Dallas Stars	2–4		Vasilevskiy	Amalie Arena	19,092	10–7–2	22	
20	November 25	Colorado Avalanche	8–2		Vasilevskiy	Amalie Arena	19,092	11–7–2	24	
21	November 27	Washington Capitals	4–5		Vasilevskiy	Amalie Arena	19,092	11–8–2	24	
22	November 29	@ Nashville Predators	3–2	OT	Johansson	Bridgestone Arena	18,228	12–8–2	26	
23	November 30	Toronto Maple Leafs	3–5		Vasilevskiy	Amalie Arena	19,092	12–9–2	26	

December: 8–3–0, 16 points (Home: 4–2–0; Road: 4–1–0)

Game	Date	Opponent	Score	OT	Decision	Location	Attendance	Record	Points	Recap
24	December 5	San Jose Sharks	8–1		Vasilevskiy	Amalie Arena	19,092	13–9–2	28	
25	December 8	@ Vancouver Canucks	4–2		Vasilevskiy	Rogers Arena	18,290	14–9–2	30	
26	December 10	@ Edmonton Oilers	1–2		Vasilevskiy	Rogers Place	18,347	14–10–2	30	
27	December 12	@ Calgary Flames	8–3		Vasilevskiy	Scotiabank Saddledome	17,028	15–10–2	32	
28	December 14	@ Seattle Kraken	5–1		Johansson	Climate Pledge Arena	17,151	16–10–2	34	
29	December 17	Columbus Blue Jackets	5–3		Vasilevskiy	Amalie Arena	19,092	17–10–2	36	
30	December 19	St. Louis Blues	3–1		Vasilevskiy	Amalie Arena	19,092	18–10–2	38	
31	December 22	Florida Panthers	2–4		Vasilevskiy	Amalie Arena	19,092	18–11–2	38	
32	December 23	@ Florida Panthers	4–0		Johansson	Amerant Bank Arena	19,544	19–11–2	40	
33	December 28	New York Rangers	6–2		Vasilevskiy	Amalie Arena	19,091	20–11–2	42	
34	December 29	Montreal Canadiens	2–5		Johansson	Amalie Arena	19,092	20–12–2	42	

January: 7–8–1, 15 points (Home: 4–1–0; Road: 1–7–1)

Game	Date	Opponent	Score	OT	Decision	Location	Attendance	Record	Points	Recap
35	January 2	@ San Jose Sharks	1–2		Vasilevskiy	SAP Center	11,103	20–13–2	42	
36	January 4	@ Los Angeles Kings	1–2		Vasilevskiy	Crypto.com Arena	18,145	20–14–2	42	
37	January 5	@ Anaheim Ducks	1–4		Johansson	Honda Center	14,208	20–15–2	42	
38	January 7	Carolina Hurricanes	3–2		Vasilevskiy	Amalie Arena	19,092	21–15–2	44	
39	January 9	Boston Bruins	4–1		Vasilevskiy	Amalie Arena	19,092	22–15–2	46	
40	January 11	@ New Jersey Devils	2–3	OT	Vasilevskiy	Prudential Center	16,514	22–15–3	47	
41	January 12	@ Pittsburgh Penguins	5–2		Johansson	PPG Paints Arena	17,352	23–15–3	49	
42	January 14	@ Boston Bruins	2–6		Vasilevskiy	TD Garden	17,850	23–16–3	49	
43	January 16	Anaheim Ducks	4–3	SO	Vasilevskiy	Amalie Arena	19,092	24–16–3	51	
44	January 18	Detroit Red Wings	5–1		Vasilevskiy	Amalie Arena	19,092	25–16–3	53	
45	January 20	@ Toronto Maple Leafs	3–5		Johansson	Scotiabank Arena	19,123	25–17–3	53	
46	January 21	@ Montreal Canadiens	2–3		Vasilevskiy	Bell Centre	21,105	25–18–3	53	
47	January 24	@ Chicago Blackhawks	4–3	OT	Johansson	United Center	18,975	26–18–3	55	
48	January 25	@ Detroit Red Wings	0–2		Vasilevskiy	Little Caesars Arena	19,515	26–19–3	55	
49	January 28	Chicago Blackhawks	1–4		Johansson	Amalie Arena	19,092	26–20–3	55	
50	January 30	Los Angeles Kings	3–0		Vasilevskiy	Amalie Arena	19,092	27–20–3	57	

February: 7–0–1, 15 points (Home: 5–0–1; Road: 2–0–0)

Game	Date	Opponent	Score	OT	Decision	Location	Attendance	Record	Points	Recap
51	February 1	New York Islanders	2–3	OT	Vasilevskiy	Amalie Arena	19,092	27–20–4	58	
52	February 4	Ottawa Senators	4–3		Vasilevskiy	Amalie Arena	19,092	28–20–4	60	
53	February 6	Ottawa Senators	5–1		Vasilevskiy	Amalie Arena	19,092	29–20–4	62	
54	February 8	@ Detroit Red Wings	6–3		Vasilevskiy	Little Caesars Arena	19,515	30–20–4	64	
55	February 9	@ Montreal Canadiens	5–3		Vasilevskiy	Bell Centre	21,105	31–20–4	66	
League-wide break for NHL 4 Nations Face-Off (February 10–21)
56	February 23	Seattle Kraken	4–1		Vasilevskiy	Amalie Arena	19,092	32–20–4	68	
57	February 25	Edmonton Oilers	4–1		Vasilevskiy	Amalie Arena	19,092	33–20–4	70	
58	February 27	Calgary Flames	3–0		Vasilevskiy	Amalie Arena	19,092	34–20–4	72	

March: 9–5–1, 19 points (Home: 6–1–0; Road: 3–4–1)

Game	Date	Opponent	Score	OT	Decision	Location	Attendance	Record	Points	Recap
59	March 1	@ Washington Capitals	3–1		Vasilevskiy	Capital One Arena	18,573	35–20–4	74	
60	March 3	@ Florida Panthers	1–2		Vasilevskiy	Amerant Bank Arena	19,441	35–21–4	74	
61	March 4	Columbus Blue Jackets	6–2		Johansson	Amalie Arena	19,092	36–21–4	76	
62	March 6	Buffalo Sabres	6–5		Vasilevskiy	Amalie Arena	19,092	37–21–4	78	
63	March 8	Boston Bruins	0–4		Vasilevskiy	Amalie Arena	19,092	37–22–4	78	
64	March 11	@ Carolina Hurricanes	1–4		Vasilevskiy	Lenovo Center	18,700	37–23–4	78	
65	March 13	@ Philadelphia Flyers	3–4	SO	Johansson	Wells Fargo Center	18,405	37–23–5	79	
66	March 15	@ Boston Bruins	6–2		Vasilevskiy	TD Garden	17,850	38–23–5	81	
67	March 17	Philadelphia Flyers	2–0		Vasilevskiy	Amalie Arena	19,092	39–23–5	83	
68	March 20	@ Dallas Stars	3–2	SO	Vasilevskiy	American Airlines Center	18,532	40–23–5	85	
69	March 22	@ Utah Hockey Club	4–6		Halverson	Delta Center	11,131	40–24–5	85	
70	March 23	@ Vegas Golden Knights	2–4		Vasilevskiy	T-Mobile Arena	17,906	40–25–5	85	
71	March 25	Pittsburgh Penguins	6–1		Vasilevskiy	Amalie Arena	19,092	41–25–5	87	
72	March 27	Utah Hockey Club	8–0		Vasilevskiy	Amalie Arena	19,092	42–25–5	89	
73	March 29	New York Islanders	5–3		Johansson	Amalie Arena	19,092	43–25–5	91	

April: 4–2–3, 11 points (Home: 2–0–2; Road: 2–2–1)

Game	Date	Opponent	Score	OT	Decision	Location	Attendance	Record	Points	Recap
74	April 1	@ New York Islanders	4–1		Vasilevskiy	UBS Arena	14,827	44–25–5	93	
75	April 3	@ Ottawa Senators	1–2		Vasilevskiy	Canadian Tire Centre	15,187	44–26–5	93	
76	April 5	@ Buffalo Sabres	2–3	SO	Johansson	KeyBank Center	15,982	44–26–6	94	
77	April 7	@ New York Rangers	5–1		Vasilevskiy	Madison Square Garden	17,130	45–26–6	96	
78	April 9	Toronto Maple Leafs	3–4	OT	Vasilevskiy	Amalie Arena	19,092	45–26–7	97	
79	April 11	Detroit Red Wings	3–4	OT	Vasilevskiy	Amalie Arena	19,092	45–26–8	98	
80	April 13	Buffalo Sabres	7–4		Johansson	Amalie Arena	19,092	46–26–8	100	
81	April 15	Florida Panthers	5–1		Vasilevskiy	Amalie Arena	19,092	47–26–8	102	
82	April 17	@ New York Rangers	0–4		Johansson	Madison Square Garden	18,006	47–27–8	102	

Lightning score listed first;

Win Loss Overtime/shootout loss

=== Playoffs ===
2025 Stanley Cup playoffs
Eastern Conference first round vs. Florida Panthers (A3) – Florida won 4–1

Game	Date	Opponent	Score	OT	Decision	Location	Attendance	Series	Recap
1	April 22	Florida Panthers	2–6		Vasilevskiy	Amalie Arena	19,092	0–1	
2	April 24	Florida Panthers	0–2		Vasilevskiy	Amalie Arena	19,092	0–2	
3	April 26	@ Florida Panthers	5–1		Vasilevskiy	Amerant Bank Arena	19,587	1–2	
4	April 28	@ Florida Panthers	2–4		Vasilevskiy	Amerant Bank Arena	19,551	1–3	
5	April 30	Florida Panthers	3–6		Vasilevskiy	Amalie Arena	19,092	1–4	

Lightning score listed first;

Win Loss

== Player stats ==
Final

=== Skaters ===
Regular season
Player	GP	G	A	Pts	+/−	PIM
Nikita Kucherov	78	37	84	121	22	45
Brandon Hagel	82	35	55	90	33	58
Brayden Point	77	42	40	82	17	7
Jake Guentzel	80	41	39	80	18	24
Victor Hedman	79	15	51	66	18	30
Anthony Cirelli	80	27	32	59	30	28
Nick Paul	76	22	19	41	13	30
Darren Raddysh	73	6	31	37	9	14
Ryan McDonagh	82	4	27	31	43	22
Erik Cernak	76	3	18	21	29	48
Gage Goncalves	60	8	12	20	7	14
Nick Perbix	74	6	13	19	8	20
Emil Lilleberg	76	1	18	19	−1	105
Mitchell Chaffee	66	12	6	18	−3	21
Conor Geekie	52	8	6	14	−4	16
J.J. Moser	54	2	12	14	20	22
Yanni Gourde^{†}	21	1	13	14	4	16
Mikey Eyssimont^{‡}	57	5	5	10	0	44
Oliver Bjorkstrand^{†}	18	5	4	9	3	4
Cam Atkinson	39	4	5	9	−4	11
Luke Glendening	77	4	3	7	−9	10
Zemgus Girgensons	82	2	4	6	−7	47
Declan Carlile	3	1	0	1	2	0
Dylan Duke	2	1	0	1	1	0
Maxwell Crozier	5	0	0	0	0	0
Conor Sheary	5	0	0	0	−2	4
Jack Finley	1	0	0	0	1	0
Steven Santini	1	0	0	0	0	0

Playoffs
Player	GP	G	A	Pts	+/−	PIM
Jake Guentzel	5	3	3	6	–3	6
Gage Goncalves	5	1	3	4	–2	2
Nikita Kucherov	5	0	4	4	0	2
Ryan McDonagh	5	0	3	3	2	0
Victor Hedman	5	0	3	3	–6	0
Nick Paul	5	2	0	2	–4	2
Brayden Point	5	2	0	2	–4	2
Luke Glendening	5	1	1	2	2	2
Erik Cernak	5	1	0	1	1	4
Anthony Cirelli	5	1	0	1	–4	18
Mitchell Chaffee	4	1	0	1	0	0
Yanni Gourde	5	0	1	1	–3	0
Emil Lilleberg	5	0	1	1	0	4
Nick Perbix	5	0	1	1	0	4
Conor Geekie	4	0	1	1	0	2
Zemgus Girgensons	5	0	0	0	0	0
J.J. Moser	5	0	0	0	–2	0
Darren Raddysh	4	0	0	0	–5	0
Brandon Hagel	3	0	0	0	–4	5

=== Goaltenders ===
Regular season
Player	GP	GS	TOI	W	L	OT	GA	GAA	SA	SV%	SO	G	A	PIM
Andrei Vasilevskiy	63	63	3743:05	38	20	5	136	2.18	1716	.921	6	0	2	8
Jonas Johansson	19	18	1110:15	9	6	3	58	3.13	554	.895	1	0	0	0
Brandon Halverson	1	1	57:57	0	1	0	5	5.18	24	.792	0	0	0	0

Playoffs
Player	GP	GS	TOI	W	L	GA	GAA	SA	SV%	SO	G	A	PIM
Andrei Vasilevskiy	5	5	293:21	1	4	16	3.27	125	.872	0	0	0	0

^{†}Denotes player spent time with another team before joining Tampa Bay. Stats reflect time with Tampa Bay only.
^{‡}Traded from Tampa Bay mid-season.
Bold/italics denotes franchise record

== Suspensions/fines ==
Player	Explanation	Length	Salary	Date issued
Conor Geekie	Suspended for one preseason game for violating NHL Rule 70.2: Leaving the players’ bench on a legal line change for the purpose of starting an altercation. The suspension was the result of leaving the bench to engage in a fight with Florida Panthers forward Josh Davies on October 2, 2024, at Amerant Bank Arena.	1 game	–	October 3, 2024
Emil Lilleberg	Suspended for two games for interference against Detroit Red Wings forward J.T. Compher on January 25, 2025, at Little Caesars Arena.	2 games	$9,062.50	January 27, 2025
Brandon Hagel	Suspended for one playoff game for an extremely forceful body check to an unsuspecting opponent against Florida Panthers forward Aleksander Barkov on April 24, 2025, at Amerant Bank Arena.	1 game	–	April 25, 2025

== Awards and honours ==
=== Awards ===
Regular season
Player	Award	Awarded
Andrei Vasilevskiy	NHL Third Star of the Week	November 18, 2024
Brayden Point	NHL Second Star of the Week	December 9, 2024
Brandon Hagel	NHL First Star of the Week	February 10, 2025
Brandon Hagel	NHL Second Star of February	March 1, 2025
Andrei Vasilevskiy	NHL First Star of the Week	March 3, 2025
Nikita Kucherov	NHL First Star of the Week	March 31, 2025
Nikita Kucherov	2024–25 Art Ross Trophy winner	April 17, 2025
Nikita Kucherov	2024–25 Ted Lindsay Award winner	June 4, 2025

=== Milestones ===
Regular season
Player	Milestone	Reached
Conor Geekie	1st career NHL game	October 11, 2024
Nikita Kucherov	6th career NHL hat-trick	October 11, 2024
Conor Geekie	1st career NHL point 1st career NHL assist	October 22, 2024
Brandon Hagel	3rd career NHL hat-trick	October 22, 2024
Brandon Hagel	300th career NHL game	October 24, 2024
Conor Geekie	1st career NHL goal	October 26, 2024
Andrei Vasilevskiy	35th career NHL shutout	October 26, 2024
Jake Guentzel	500th career NHL point	October 28, 2024
Zemgus Girgensons	700th career NHL game	November 3, 2024
Luke Glendening	800th career NHL game	November 5, 2024
Anthony Cirelli	100th career NHL goal	November 14, 2024
Andrei Vasilevskiy	300th career NHL win	November 14, 2024
Gage Goncalves	1st career NHL point 1st career NHL assist	November 21, 2024
Nikita Kucherov	900th career NHL point	November 21, 2024
Zemgus Girgensons	100th career NHL assist	November 25, 2024
Jon Cooper	900th career NHL game	November 27, 2024
Brayden Point	5th career NHL hat-trick	November 27, 2024
Brandon Hagel	100th career NHL goal	November 29, 2024
Brayden Point	600th career NHL game	December 5, 2024
Brayden Point	300th career NHL assist	December 8, 2024
Andrei Vasilevskiy	500th career NHL game	December 12, 2024
Jake Guentzel	8th career hattrick	December 12, 2024
Declan Carlile	1st career NHL goal 1st career NHL point	December 14, 2024
Gage Goncalves	1st career NHL goal	December 19, 2024
Erik Cernak	400th career NHL game	January 5, 2025
Ryan McDonagh	400th career NHL point	January 9, 2025
Brayden Point	600th career NHL point	January 9, 2025
Jack Finley	1st career NHL game	January 14, 2025
Victor Hedman	600th career NHL assist	January 16, 2025
Nikita Kucherov	600th career NHL assist	January 18, 2025
Cam Atkinson	800th career NHL game	January 25, 2025
Victor Hedman	1100th career NHL game	January 30, 2025
Erik Cernak	100th career NHL point	February 6, 2025
Dylan Duke	1st career NHL goal 1st career NHL point 1st career NHL game	February 8, 2025
Nick Perbix	200th career NHL game	March 3, 2025
Nick Paul	100th career NHL assist	March 15, 2025
Emil Lilleberg	100th career NHL game	March 20, 2025
Anthony Cirelli	500th career NHL game	March 25, 2025
Ryan McDonagh	1000th career NHL game	March 27, 2025
Brayden Point	300th career NHL point	March 27, 2025
Andrei Vasilevskiy	40th career NHL shutout	March 27, 2025
Jake Guentzel	300th career NHL assist	April 1, 2025
Nikita Kucherov	800th career NHL game	April 11, 2025
Yanni Gourde	600th career NHL game	April 13, 2025
Emil Lilleberg	1st career NHL goal	April 13, 2025
Jake Guentzel	600th career NHL game	April 17, 2025

Playoffs
Player	Milestone	Reached
Zemgus Girgensons	1st career playoff game	April 22, 2025
Conor Geekie	1st career playoff game	April 22, 2025
J.J. Moser	1st career playoff game	April 22, 2025
Gage Goncalves	1st career playoff game 1st career playoff point 1st career playoff assist	April 22, 2025
Emil Lilleberg	1st career playoff point 1st career playoff assist	April 28, 2025
Mitchell Chaffee	1st career playoff goal 1st career playoff point	April 28, 2025
Gage Goncalves	1st career playoff goal	April 30, 2025
Conor Geekie	1st career playoff point 1st career playoff assist	April 30, 2025

=== Records ===
Regular season
Player	Record	Reached
Nikita Kucherov	Third most points in Tampa Bay Lightning history. Kucherov passed Vincent Lecavalier (874).	October 11, 2024
Nikita Kucherov	Third most hat-tricks in Tampa Bay Lightning history. Kurcherov tied Vincent Lecavalier (6).	October 11, 2024
Brayden Point	Ninth most games played in Tampa Bay Lightning history. Point passed Tyler Johnson (589).	October 30, 2024
Victor Hedman	Second most assists in Tampa Bay Lightning history. Hedman passed Steven Stamkos (582).	November 14, 2024
Andrei Vasilevskiy	First goaltender in Tampa Bay Lightning history to record 300 wins. Vasilevskiy also became the fastest player to reach 300 wins in NHL History (490 games). Vasilevskiy passed Jacques Plante (521).	November 14, 2024
Nikita Kucherov	Third player in Tampa Bay Lightning history to record 900 career points. Kucherov joined Martin St. Louis and Steven Stamkos as the only players to do so.	November 21, 2024
Brandon Hagel	First player in Tampa Bay Lightning history to record 4 assists in a single period. Hagel also tied the NHL record for most assists in the first period.	November 25, 2024
Brandon Hagel	Most assists in a single game by a Tampa Bay Lightning player. Hagel tied Mark Recchi, Martin St. Louis and Darren Raddysh (5).	November 25, 2024
Brayden Point	Third most power play goals in Tampa Bay Lightning history. Point passed Martin St. Louis (96).	November 27, 2024
Brayden Point	Fourth most hat-tricks in Tampa Bay Lightning history. Point passed Tyler Johnson (4).	November 27, 2024
Jon Cooper	First head coach in Tampa Bay Lightning history to reach 900 games coached. Cooper also had the second most wins in 900 games (536) in NHL history behind only Scotty Bowman (548).	November 27, 2024
Anthony Cirelli	Second most shorthanded goals in Tampa Bay Lightning history. Cirelli tied Rob Zamuner (14).	November 29, 2024
Victor Hedman	Most assists in Tampa Bay Lightning history. Hedman passed Martin St. Louis (588).	November 30, 2024
Nikita Kucherov	Third most assists in Tampa Bay Lightning history. Kucherov passed Steven Stamkos (582).	December 12, 2024
Nikita Kucherov	Most assists in a single game by a Tampa Bay Lightning player. Kucherov tied Mark Recchi, Martin St. Louis, Darren Raddysh and Brandon Hagel (5).	December 12, 2024
Nikita Kucherov	Most six point games in Tampa Bay Lightning history. Kucherov passed Brayden Point and Doug Crossman (1).	December 12, 2024
Andrei Vasilevskiy	First goaltender in Tampa Bay Lightning history to play in 500 career games. Vasilevskiy also set the NHL record for most wins in their first 500 games (306).	December 12, 2024
Nikita Kucherov	Second most multipoint games in Tampa Bay Lightning history. Kucherov passed Martin St. Louis (257).	December 14, 2024
Victor Hedman	Most games played in Tampa Bay Lightning history. Hedman passed Stamkos (1082).	December 28, 2024
Anthony Cirelli	Second most shorthanded goals in Tampa Bay Lightning history. Cirelli passed Rob Zamuner (14).	December 28, 2024
Nikita Kucherov	Second most assists in Tampa Bay Lightning history. Kucherov passed Martin St. Louis (588).	December 28, 2024
Victor Hedman	Seventh most goals in Tampa Bay Lightning history. Hedman passed Tyler Johnson (161).	January 11, 2025
Victor Hedman	First player in Tampa Bay Lightning history to record 600 career assists. Hedman was the fourth Swedish born defenseman to record 600 career assists. Hedman was also the 19th defenseman in NHL history to record 600 assists.	January 16, 2025
Nikita Kucherov	Second player in Tampa Bay Lightning history to record 600 career assists.	January 18, 2025
Nikita Kucherov	Most seasons with 50+ assists in Tampa Bay Lightning history. Kucherov tied Martin St. Louis for the most 50+ assist seasons (6).	January 25, 2025
Victor Hedman	First player in Tampa Bay Lightning history to appear in 1,100 games with the franchise.	January 30, 2025
Brayden Point	Eighth most games played in Tampa Bay Lightning history. Point passed Ondrej Palat (628).	February 8, 2025
Nikita Kucherov	Second most points in Tampa Bay Lightning history. Kucherov passed Martin St. Louis (953).	February 8, 2025
Nikita Kucherov	Most assists in Tampa Bay Lightning history. Kucherov passed Victor Hedman (607).	February 8, 2025
Nikita Kucherov	Most three point games in Tampa Bay Lightning history. Kucherov passed Steven Stamkos (103).	March 27, 2025
Nikita Kucherov	First player in Tampa Bay Lightning history to win the Art Ross Trophy in consecutive seasons. Kucherov also passed Martin St. Louis for most Art Ross Trophy Wins in franchise history (2).	April 17, 2025
Ryan McDonagh	Highest +/- in a single season in Tampa Bay Lightning history. McDonagh passed Nikita Kucherov and himself (+38).	April 17, 2025

== Transactions ==
The Lightning have been involved in the following transactions during the 2024–25 season.

=== Trades ===
Date	Details		Ref
June 29, 2024	To Utah Hockey Club Mikhail Sergachev	To Tampa Bay Lightning Conor Geekie; J.J. Moser; 7th-round pick in 2024; 2nd-round pick in 2025	
June 29, 2024	To Los Angeles Kings Tanner Jeannot	To Tampa Bay Lightning 4th-round pick in 2024; 2nd-round pick in 2025	
June 30, 2024	To Carolina Hurricanes 3rd-round pick in 2025	To Tampa Bay Lightning Jake Guentzel	
June 30, 2024	To Pittsburgh Penguins Bennett MacArthur	To Tampa Bay Lightning Lukas Svejkovsky	
January 25, 2025	To New York Rangers Lucas Edmonds	To Tampa Bay Lightning Ryder Korczak	
February 26, 2025	To Nashville Predators Jesse Ylonen	To Tampa Bay Lightning Anthony Angello	
March 5, 2025	To Seattle Kraken Mikey Eyssimont; 2nd-round pick in 2025; 1st-round pick in 2026; 1st-round pick in 2027	To Tampa Bay Lightning Oliver Bjorkstrand; 5th-round pick in 2025	
March 5, 2025	To Detroit Red Wings 4th-round pick in 2025	To Tampa Bay Lightning Kyle Aucoin; Yanni Gourde	
March 30, 2025	To Carolina Hurricanes 6th-round pick in 2025	To Tampa Bay Lightning Lucas Mercuri	

=== Free agents ===
Date	Player	Team	Contract term	Ref
July 1, 2024	Jake Guentzel	from Carolina Hurricanes	7-year	
July 1, 2024	Tobie Paquette-Bisson	from Montreal Canadiens	1-year	
July 1, 2024	Derrick Pouliot	from Dallas Stars	1-year	
July 1, 2024	Steven Santini	from Los Angeles Kings	1-year	
July 1, 2024	Jesse Ylonen	from Montreal Canadiens	1-year	
July 1, 2024	Zemgus Girgensons	from Buffalo Sabres	3-year	
July 1, 2024	Steven Stamkos	to Nashville Predators	4-year	
July 1, 2024	Anthony Duclair	to New York Islanders	4-year	
July 1, 2024	Calvin de Haan	to Colorado Avalanche	1-year	
July 1, 2024	Alex Barre-Boulet	to Montreal Canadiens	1-year	
July 1, 2024	Matt Dumba	to Dallas Stars	2-year	
July 1, 2024	Cole Koepke	to Boston Bruins	1-year	
July 2, 2024	Tyler Motte	to Detroit Red Wings	1-year	
July 2, 2024	Philippe Myers	to Toronto Maple Leafs	1-year	
July 2, 2024	Cam Atkinson	from Philadelphia Flyers	1-year	
May 22, 2025	Wojciech Stachowiak	from ERC Ingolstadt	1-year	
June 3, 2025	Ryan Fanti	from Syracuse Crunch	1-year	

=== Waivers ===
Date	Player	Team	Ref

=== Contract terminations ===
Date	Player	Via	Ref
October 29, 2024	Lukas Svejkovsky	Contract termination	

=== Retirement ===
Date	Player	Ref

=== Signings ===
Key:

† Contract is entry-level.

Date	Player	Contract term	Ref
July 2, 2024	Victor Hedman	4-year	
July 2, 2024	Emil Lilleberg	2-year	
July 11, 2024	J.J. Moser	2-year	
February 3, 2025	Brandon Halverson	2-year	
March 4, 2025	Logan Brown	1-year	
March 24, 2025	Cooper Flinton	2-year†	
March 30, 2025	Connor Kurth	2-year†	
March 30, 2025	Lucas Mercuri	2-year†	
May 5, 2025	Charle-Edouard D'Astous	1-year	
May 7, 2025	Jonas Johansson	2-year	
June 2, 2025	Yanni Gourde	6-year	
June 3, 2025	Steven Santini	2-year	
June 6, 2025	Max Crozier	3-year	
June 8, 2025	Jack Finley	3-year	

== Draft picks ==
Below are the Tampa Bay Lightning's selections at the 2024 NHL entry draft, which was held on June 28 and 29, 2024, at the Sphere in Las Vegas, Nevada.

Round	#	Player	Pos	Nationality	College/Junior/Club team (League)
4	118^{1}	Jan Golicic	D	Slovenia	Gatineau Olympiques (QMJHL)
4	128^{2}	Hagen Burrows	RW	United States	Minnetonka High School (MSHSL)
5	149	Joona Saarelainen	RW	Finland	KalPa (Liiga)
6	181	Kaden Pitre	RW	Canada	Flint Firebirds (OHL)
7	195^{3}	Joe Connor	LW	United States	Muskegon Lumberjacks (USHL)
7	199^{4}	Noah Steen	LW	Norway	Mora IK (Swe-1)
7	206^{5}	Harrison Meneghin	G	Canada	Lethbridge Hurricanes (WHL)

Notes:

1. Tampa Bay previously acquired this pick as the result of a trade on March 18, 2022, that sent Boris Katchouk, Taylor Raddysh, a conditional first-round pick in 2023 and 2024 to Chicago in exchange for Brandon Hagel, a fourth-round pick in 2022 and this pick.
2. The Edmonton Oilers' fourth-round pick went to the Tampa Bay Lightning as the result of a trade on May 21, 2024, that sent a seventh-round pick in 2024 and a second-round pick in 2025 to Nashville in exchange for Ryan McDonagh and this pick.
3. The Chicago Blackhawks' seventh-round pick went to the Lightning as the result of a trade on June 29, 2023, that sent Corey Perry to Chicago in exchange for this pick.
4. The Utah Hockey Club's seventh-round pick went to the Lightning as the result of a trade on June 29, 2024, that sent Mikhail Sergachev to Utah in exchange for Conor Geekie, J.J. Moser, Toronto's second-round pick in 2025, and this pick.
5. The Minnesota Wild's seventh-round pick went to the Lightning as the result of a trade on July 2, 2023, that sent Patrick Maroon and Maxim Cajkovic to Minnesota in exchange for this pick.
