= Logan Brown (ice hockey) =

American ice hockey player (born 1998)

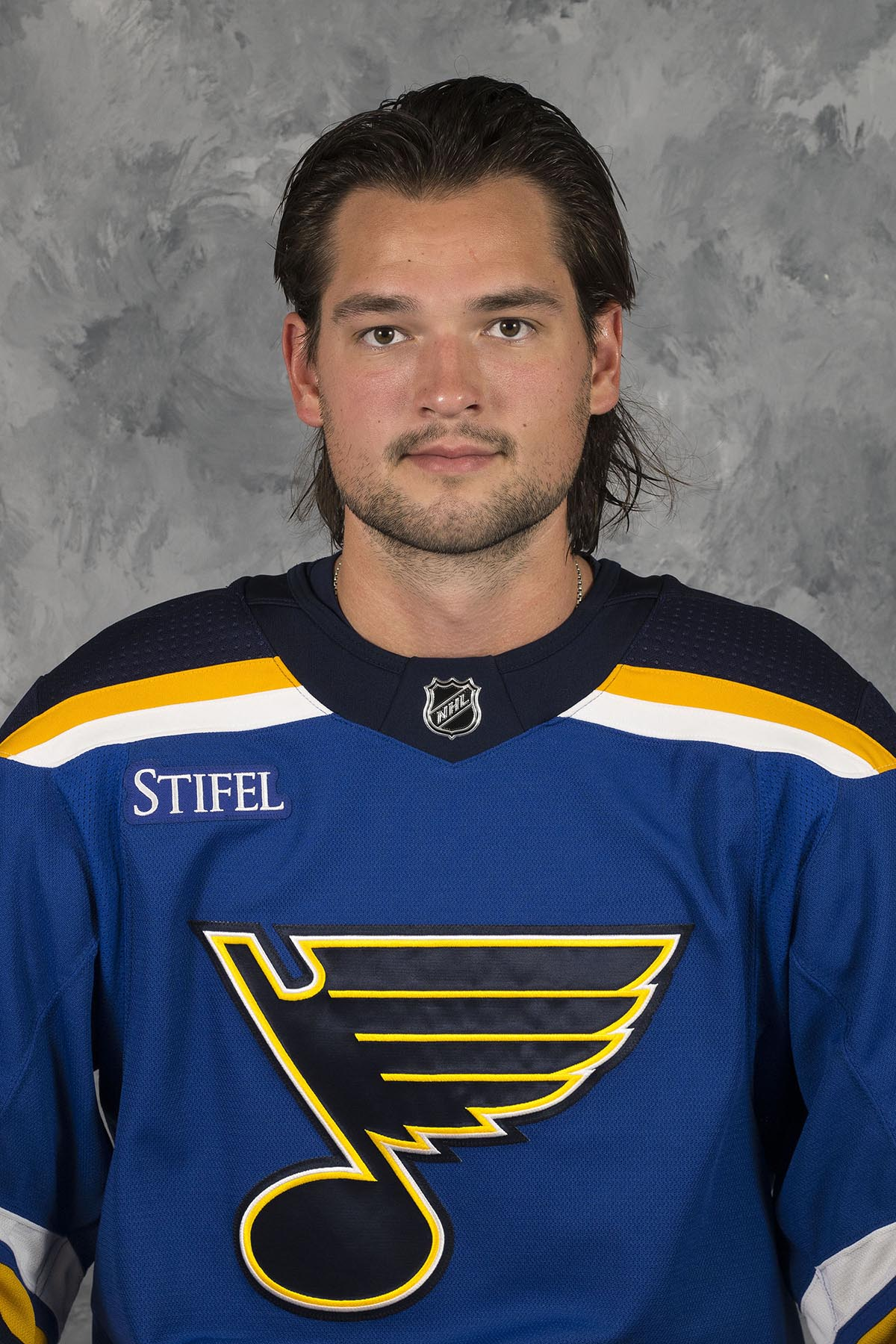
- Brown with the St. Louis Blues in 2022
- Born: March 5, 1998 (age 28) Raleigh, North Carolina, U.S.
- Height: 6 ft 6 in (198 cm)
- Weight: 229 lb (104 kg; 16 st 5 lb)
- Position: Center
- Shoots: Left
- NHL team Former teams: Free agent Ottawa Senators; St. Louis Blues
- NHL draft: 11th overall, 2016; Ottawa Senators
- Playing career: 2017–present

Logan Mathers Brown (born March 5, 1998) is an American professional ice hockey player who is currently an unrestricted free agent. He most recently played for the Ontario Reign of the American Hockey League (AHL) while under contract to the Los Angeles Kings of the National Hockey League (NHL). He was selected in the first round, 11th overall, by the Ottawa Senators in the 2016 NHL entry draft, and has also played with the St. Louis Blues.

== Playing career ==
=== Youth ===
Brown played minor ice hockey in St. Louis and Indiana where his father, former NHL All-Star Jeff Brown, was coaching. He participated in the 2010 and 2011 Quebec International Pee-Wee Hockey Tournaments with his St. Louis team.

=== Junior ===
==== Niagara IceDogs ====
Brown was selected by the Niagara IceDogs of the OHL in the first round (sixth overall) in the 2014 OHL Priority Selection. However, he was traded to the Windsor Spitfires for six draft picks.

==== Windsor Spitfires ====
Brown skated at the NTDP Evaluation Camp, but ultimately decided to play in the Ontario Hockey League for the 2014–15 season. Brown appeared in his first game with the Windsor Spitfires on September 28, 2014, scoring a goal against Justin Nichols of the Guelph Storm in a 2–1 loss. On October 9, Brown registered his first multi-point game in the OHL, recording two assists in a 5–4 win over the Peterborough Petes. On January 4, Brown recorded his first multi-goal game, scoring twice in a 5–4 victory over the Mississauga Steelheads. Overall, Brown finished his rookie season with 17 goals and 43 points in 56 games, however, the rebuilding Spitfires finished in last place in the Western Conference and failed to qualify for the playoffs.

During the 2015–16 season, Brown set a career high with four points in a game, scoring a goal and earning three assists in a 5–3 win over the Flint Firebirds on January 21, 2016. Brown would record another four point game later in the season, again scoring a goal and adding three assists in a 6–4 win over the Kitchener Rangers on March 17. On February 28, Brown recorded the first hat-trick of his career, scoring three goals against Brandon Halverson of the Sault Ste. Marie Greyhounds in a 4–3 victory. Brown finished the season with 74 points, the second highest total on the team, as he scored 21 goals and added 53 assists in 59 games. Brown appeared in his first OHL playoff game on March 24, 2016, earning an assist in a 6–5 overtime loss to the Kitchener Rangers. In the fourth game of the series, with the Spitfires facing elimination, Brown recorded four assists in a 5–4 overtime win. Overall, Brown earned six points, all assists, in five playoff games.

Injuries plagued Brown's season in 2016–17, as he appeared in only 35 games, scoring 14 goals and 40 points. Brown did earn two hat-tricks during the season, the first one on October 13, 2016, scoring three goals against Connor Hicks of the Flint Firebirds in a 7–2 victory. His second hat-trick came on January 19 against the Ottawa 67's (who were coached by his father Jeff) in a 4–0 victory. In the playoffs, Brown earned four assists in seven games as the Spitfires lost to the London Knights in the first round of the playoffs. The Spitfires hosted the 2017 Memorial Cup, and Brown made his debut on May 19, being held off the score sheet in a 3–2 win over the Saint John Sea Dogs. In his second game, Brown scored his first Memorial Cup goal against Carl Stankowski of the Seattle Thunderbirds, and added two assists, in a 7–1 victory. In the Memorial Cup final, Brown earned two assists in a 4–3 victory over the Erie Otters.

After making the team out of training camp and beginning the 2017–18 season in the NHL with Ottawa, Brown returned to the Spitfires at the end of October. On October 27, in his second game back with the club, Brown recorded two goals and four points in a 7–2 win over the Sudbury Wolves. On November 11, Brown scored a hat-trick and added an assist in a 6–5 victory over the Kitchener Rangers.

In January 2018, Brown was traded to the Kitchener Rangers along with Austin McEneny in exchange for Grayson Ladd and a package of four draft picks. In 15 games with Windsor, Brown scored 13 goals and 24 points.

==== Kitchener Rangers ====
Brown played his first game with the Kitchener Rangers on January 26, 2018, earning three assists in a 6–2 win over the Saginaw Spirit. The next day, on January 27, Brown scored his first two goals with the Rangers against Garrett Forrest on the Flint Firebirds, and added an assist in a 5–3 victory. In his third game with Kitchener, on February 2, Brown recorded four assists in a 4–3 win over the Hamilton Bulldogs. On February 27, Brown earned another four point night, scoring two goals and two assists in a 6–3 win over the Sarnia Sting. In 17 games with the Rangers, Brown scored nine goals and 24 points, helping lead the club to their first division title since 2008.

On March 23, in his playoff debut with Kitchener, Brown earned an assist in a 7–2 victory over the Guelph Storm. In game four of the series, Brown earned three assists in a 6–4 loss to Guelph. In game six, Brown scored his first two OHL playoff goals against Anthony Popovich of the Storm, and added an assist in a 5–2 series clinching win. Overall, in 19 playoff games, Brown scored five goals and 27 points, as Kitchener lost to the Sault Ste. Marie Greyhounds in the Western Conference finals.

=== Professional ===
==== Ottawa Senators ====
On August 19, 2016, Brown signed a three-year, entry-level contract with the Ottawa Senators. Brown made his NHL debut with the Senators on October 5, 2017, against the Washington Capitals. He recorded his first NHL point, an assist, on October 21, 2017, in a game against the Toronto Maple Leafs. Brown was returned to Windsor later in the month having posted one assist in four games with the Senators. After attending the 2018 training camp with the Senators, Brown was assigned to the team's farm team in the American Hockey League, the Belleville Senators. Brown spent almost all of the season with Belleville except for two games with Ottawa in February, in which he did not score a point.

During the 2019–20 season, Brown again started with Belleville. He was recalled early in the season on October 22, 2019. He played in 23 games with Senators, primarily on the fourth line, registering one goal and eight points. He scored his first NHL goal versus the New York Rangers in a 4–1 win on November 22, 2019. He was returned to Belleville on December 28 during the holiday roster freeze in order to get him more playing time. Brown remained with Belleville until a callup in May 2021 during the 2020–21 season where he played one game with Ottawa.

==== St. Louis Blues ====
On September 25, 2021, Brown was traded to the St. Louis Blues along with a conditional fourth-round 2022 draft pick in exchange for Zach Sanford. Brown scored his first goal with the Blues in his first appearance for the team. On February 8, 2022 he signed a one-year contract extension with the Blues. During the 2022–23 season Brown split time between St. Louis and the Blues' AHL affiliate, the Springfield Thunderbirds. He played in 30 games with St. Louis, registering two goals and eight points. He was injured in a 5–1 loss to the Philadelphia Flyers on November 8, 2022 that kept him out of the lineup until December 19, 2022.

==== Tampa Bay Lightning ====
As a free agent from the Blues, Brown was signed to a one-year, two-way contract with the Tampa Bay Lightning for the 2023–24 season on July 1, 2023. Brown was placed on a long-term injury reserve to begin the season suffering from an undisclosed injury that kept him out indefinitely. After missing the entirety of the season and having concluded his one-year contract, Brown continued his association with the Lightning by agreeing as a free agent to a professional tryout agreement (PTO) for Tampa's 2024 training camp. Following his PTO, on October 7, Brown signed a one-year contract with the Syracuse Crunch, Tampa Bay's AHL affiliate, for the 2024–25 season. He signed one-year contract with Tampa Bay on March 4, 2025, though he was placed on waivers in order to keep him in the AHL.

==== Los Angeles Kings ====
As a free agent from the Lightning organization, Brown was signed to a one-year, two-way contract on July 2, 2025.

== International play ==
While Brown played for Canada at the World U-17 Hockey Challenge in 2014, he chose to play with Team USA for the 2016 IIHF World U18 Championships with four of his other St. Louis friends he grew up playing hockey with. Accordingly, Brown will play international hockey with Team USA for the remainder of his career.

== Personal life ==
Brown was born in Raleigh, North Carolina when his father, Jeff Brown, was playing for the Carolina Hurricanes.

== Career statistics ==
=== Regular season and playoffs ===
			Regular season					Playoffs
Season	Team	League	GP	G	A	Pts	PIM	GP	G	A	Pts	PIM
2014–15	Windsor Spitfires	OHL	56	17	26	43	20	—	—	—	—	—
2015–16	Windsor Spitfires	OHL	59	21	53	74	40	5	0	6	6	6
2016–17	Windsor Spitfires	OHL	35	14	26	40	27	7	0	4	4	6
2017–18	Windsor Spitfires	OHL	15	13	11	24	10	—	—	—	—	—
2017–18	Kitchener Rangers	OHL	17	9	15	24	6	19	5	22	27	6
2017–18	Ottawa Senators	NHL	4	0	1	1	0	—	—	—	—	—
2018–19	Belleville Senators	AHL	56	14	28	42	24	—	—	—	—	—
2018–19	Ottawa Senators	NHL	2	0	0	0	0	—	—	—	—	—
2019–20	Belleville Senators	AHL	25	7	21	28	43	—	—	—	—	—
2019–20	Ottawa Senators	NHL	23	1	7	8	4	—	—	—	—	—
2020–21	Belleville Senators	AHL	13	2	7	9	8	—	—	—	—	—
2020–21	Ottawa Senators	NHL	1	0	0	0	2	—	—	—	—	—
2021–22	Springfield Thunderbirds	AHL	19	6	11	17	10	—	—	—	—	—
2021–22	St. Louis Blues	NHL	39	4	7	11	8	—	—	—	—	—
2022–23	St. Louis Blues	NHL	30	2	4	6	8	—	—	—	—	—
2022–23	Springfield Thunderbirds	AHL	2	0	2	2	0	—	—	—	—	—
2024–25	Syracuse Crunch	AHL	33	11	18	29	14	3	0	1	1	0
2025–26	Ontario Reign	AHL	31	1	15	16	8	5	2	0	2	0
NHL totals			99	7	19	26	22	—	—	—	—	—

=== International ===
Year	Team	Event	Result	GP	G	A	Pts	PIM
2014	Canada Red	U17	6th	5	2	2	4	2
2016	United States	U18	3rd place, bronze medalist(s)	7	3	9	12	2
2018	United States	WJC	3rd place, bronze medalist(s)	3	0	1	1	0
Junior totals				15	5	12	17	4

Awards and achievements
Preceded by Colin White	Ottawa Senators first-round draft pick 2016	Succeeded by Shane Bowers
