= Emil Lilleberg =

Norwegian ice hockey player (born 2001)

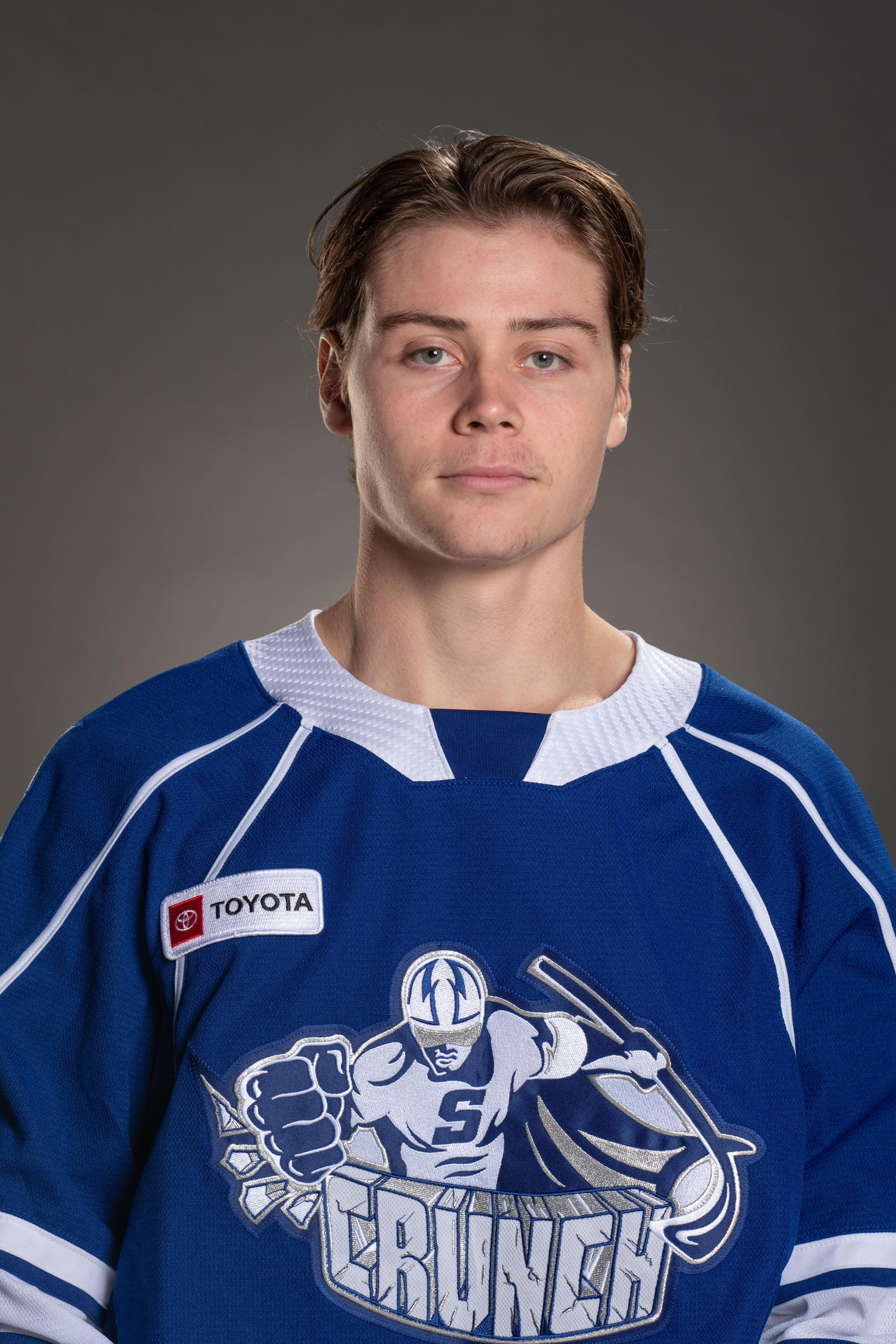
- Lilleberg with the Syracuse Crunch in 2023
- Born: 2 February 2001 (age 25) Sarpsborg, Norway
- Height: 6 ft 3 in (191 cm)
- Weight: 215 lb (98 kg; 15 st 5 lb)
- Position: Defence
- Shoots: Left
- NHL team Former teams: Tampa Bay Lightning; Sparta Warriors; IK Oskarshamn
- National team: Norway
- NHL draft: 107th overall, 2021; Arizona Coyotes
- Playing career: 2019–present

Emil Martinsen Lilleberg (born 2 February 2001) is a Norwegian ice hockey player who is a defenceman for the Tampa Bay Lightning of the National Hockey League (NHL). Internationally, Lilleberg represents the Norwegian national team. He made his NHL debut in 2024.

== Playing career ==
Lilleberg was originally drafted 107th overall in the 2021 NHL entry draft by the Arizona Coyotes.

On 5 June 2023, the Tampa Bay Lightning signed Lilleberg to a two-year deal. Lilleberg had been playing for IK Oskarshamn of the Swedish Hockey League. Lilleberg recorded 8 assists in 46 regular season games, and had one assist in three playoff games last season with IK Oskarshamn.

During his first season in North America, Lilleberg began the 2023–24 campaign with the Lightning's AHL affiliate, the Syracuse Crunch. Following 31 games with the Crunch, Lilleberg was recalled and made his NHL debut with the Lightning against the Boston Bruins at TD Garden on 6 January 2024. On 10 January 2024, Lilleberg recorded his 1st career NHL assist and point. The assist came in a 3–2 overtime win over the Los Angeles Kings at Amalie Arena.

Lilleberg was suspended for two games for interference involving contact to the head of and injury to J. T. Compher in the second period of the Lightning's 2–0 away loss to the Detroit Red Wings on 25 January 2025.

== International play ==
He represented Norway at the 2021 IIHF World Championship.

== Career statistics ==
=== Regular season and playoffs ===
			Regular season					Playoffs
Season	Team	League	GP	G	A	Pts	PIM	GP	G	A	Pts	PIM
2018–19	Sparta Sarpsborg	GET	37	1	1	2	24	6	0	0	0	4
2019–20	Sparta Sarpsborg	GET	39	0	12	12	71	—	—	—	—	—
2020–21	Sparta Sarpsborg	NOR	18	2	2	4	39	—	—	—	—	—
2021–22	IK Oskarshamn	SHL	47	0	7	7	16	10	0	0	0	2
2022–23	IK Oskarshamn	SHL	46	3	8	11	41	3	0	1	1	2
2023–24	Syracuse Crunch	AHL	33	2	11	13	45	5	0	2	2	2
2023–24	Tampa Bay Lightning	NHL	37	0	5	5	16	5	0	0	0	2
2024–25	Tampa Bay Lightning	NHL	76	1	18	19	105	5	0	1	1	4
2025–26	Tampa Bay Lightning	NHL	50	4	8	12	61	7	0	0	0	4
SHL totals			95	3	15	18	57	13	0	1	1	4
NHL totals			163	5	31	36	182	17	0	1	1	10

=== International ===
Year	Team	Event	Result	GP	G	A	Pts	PIM
2018	Norway	WJC18-D1	15th	5	0	1	1	2
2019	Norway	WJC18-D1	14th	5	0	2	2	8
2019	Norway	WJC-D1	13th	4	0	3	3	6
2020	Norway	WJC-D1	14th	5	0	2	2	4
2021	Norway	WC	13th	6	1	0	1	14
2021	Norway	OGQ	DNQ	3	0	0	0	2
2022	Norway	WC	13th	7	0	0	0	4
2023	Norway	WC	13th	7	0	0	0	4
2024	Norway	OGQ	DNQ	3	0	0	0	0
2025	Norway	WC	12th	7	0	0	0	4
Junior totals				19	0	8	8	20
Senior totals				33	1	0	1	28
