= J. J. Moser =

Swiss ice hockey player (born 2000)

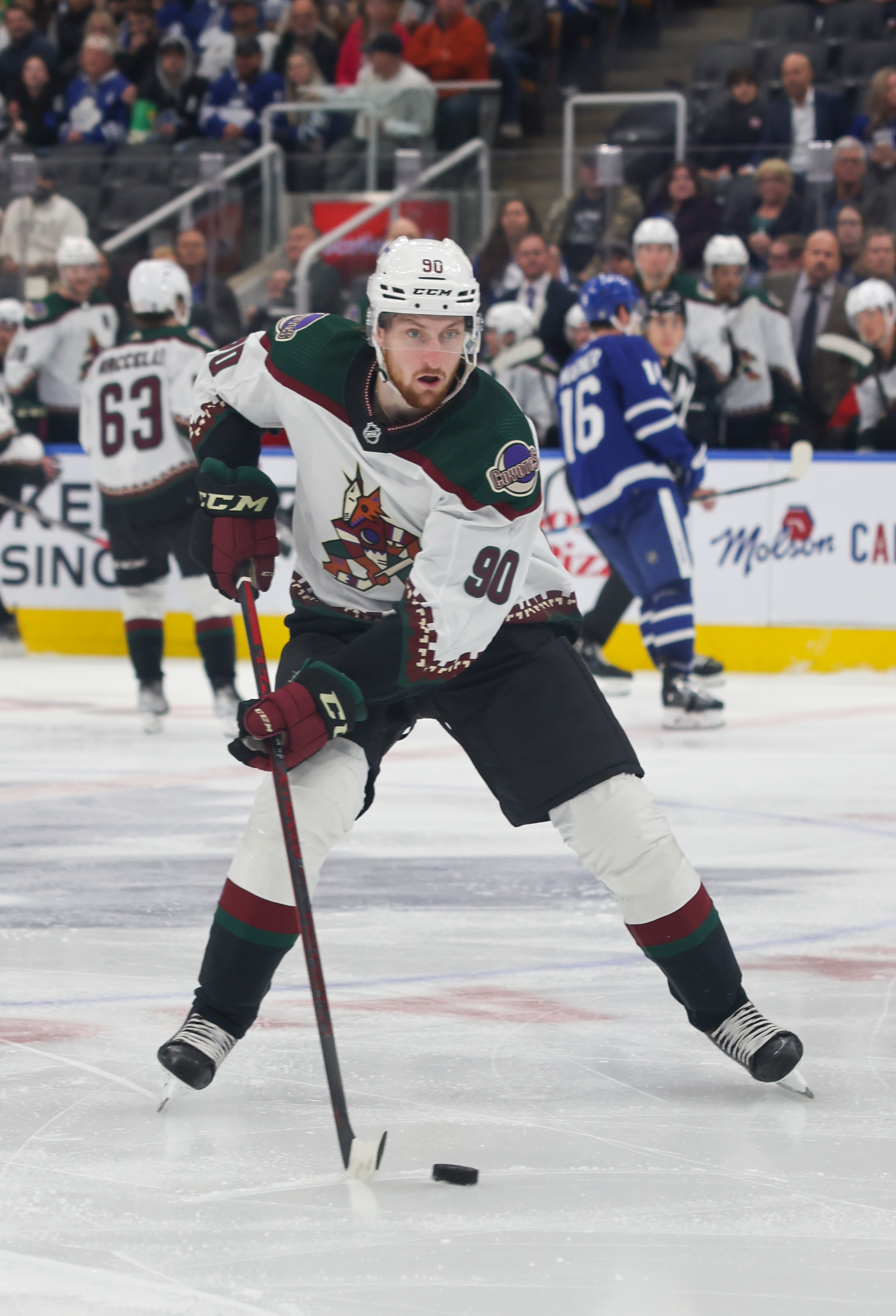
- Moser with the Arizona Coyotes in 2022
- Born: 6 June 2000 (age 26) Biel, Switzerland
- Height: 6 ft 1 in (185 cm)
- Weight: 175 lb (79 kg; 12 st 7 lb)
- Position: Defence
- Shoots: Left
- NHL team Former teams: Tampa Bay Lightning; EHC Biel; Arizona Coyotes
- National team: Switzerland
- NHL draft: 60th overall, 2021; Arizona Coyotes
- Playing career: 2018–present

Janis Jérôme Moser (born 6 June 2000) is a Swiss professional ice hockey player who is a defenceman for the Tampa Bay Lightning of the National Hockey League (NHL). He was selected 60th overall in the 2021 NHL entry draft by the Arizona Coyotes.

== Playing career ==
Moser started to play junior hockey at EHC Biel as a sixteen-year-old. He captained their Junior Elite A team during his last junior season in 2017–18 and made his National League (NL) debut that same year, appearing in two games (one assist) with EHC Biel. Moser started the 2018–19 season with Biel's NL team and played 43 games (seven assists) and 12 playoff games (two assists). At the conclusion of the 2019 playoffs, he agreed to his first professional contract with Biel, signing a two-year deal on 10 April 2019. The contract contained an National Hockey League (NHL) out clause for the 2020–21 season. On 13 October 2020, Moser agreed to an early three-year contract extension to remain with EHC Biel through the 2023–24 season.

Following his selection in the second round of the 2021 NHL entry draft, on 14 August 2021, Moser was signed to a three-year, entry-level contract by the Arizona Coyotes of the NHL. He began the 2021–22 season with Arizona's American Hockey League (AHL) affiliate, the Tucson Roadrunners. After registering 5 goals and 12 points in 18 games, he was recalled by the Coyotes in December after Jakob Chychrun was placed on injured reserve. Moser made his NHL debut on 15 December, in a 3–2 loss to the New York Rangers. Moser scored his first and second NHL goals in a 8–7 loss to the San Jose Sharks on 28 December. He remained with the Coyotes for the rest of the season. The 2022–23 season saw Moser play in all 82 games and develop into a key part of Arizona's defence.

Moser was transferred to the Utah Hockey Club, after the Coyotes became an inactive franchise following the 2023–24 season. However, on 29 June 2024, Moser was traded along with Conor Geekie, a seventh-round pick (199th overall) in the 2024 NHL entry draft, and a second-round pick in the 2025 NHL entry draft to the Tampa Bay Lightning for defenceman Mikhail Sergachev. On 11 July, Moser signed a two-year, $6.75 million contract with the Lightning. Midway through the 2025–26 season, Moser signed an eight-year, $54 million contract extension with the Lightning. At the time, he had three goals and nine assists for 12 points through 34 games.

== International play ==
J. J. Moser
Medal record

Representing Switzerland

Ice hockey

World Championships
Silver medal – second place	2025 Sweden/Denmark	
Silver medal – second place	2026 Switzerland	

Moser was named to Switzerland's under-20 team for the 2019 IIHF World Junior Championships in Vancouver, Canada. The Swiss team finished fourth in the tournament, losing the bronze medal game to Russia. He returned for the 2020 IIHF World Junior Championships held in the Czech Republic.

Moser made his senior debut with Switzerland men's national team in February 2019. He was later selected to play for Switzerland at the 2019 IIHF World Championship in Slovakia. Moser sustained a wrist injury during the third game of the world championship against Austria, forcing him to sit out the remainder of the tournament. Moser rejoined the men's national team for the 2020 and 2021 world championships. He was added to the national team roster for the 2025 IIHF World Championship late after his season with the Lightning ended. Switzerland advanced to the gold medal game, facing off against the United States. They were defeated 1–0 in overtime by the United States, earning the silver medal in the tournament.

On 7 January 2026, Moser was selected to Switzerland's roster for the 2026 Winter Olympics.

== Career statistics ==
=== Regular season and playoffs ===
			Regular season					Playoffs
Season	Team	League	GP	G	A	Pts	PIM	GP	G	A	Pts	PIM
2016–17	EHC Biel	Elite Jr. A	15	0	3	3	4	3	0	0	0	2
2017–18	EHC Biel	Elite Jr. A	41	6	16	22	22	8	3	3	6	6
2017–18	EHC Biel	NL	2	0	1	1	0	—	—	—	—	—
2018–19	EHC Biel	NL	43	0	7	7	20	12	0	2	2	6
2019–20	EHC Biel	NL	40	2	7	9	10	—	—	—	—	—
2020–21	EHC Biel	NL	48	9	21	30	10	2	0	0	0	0
2021–22	Tucson Roadrunners	AHL	18	5	7	12	11	—	—	—	—	—
2021–22	Arizona Coyotes	NHL	43	4	11	15	16	—	—	—	—	—
2022–23	Arizona Coyotes	NHL	82	7	24	31	35	—	—	—	—	—
2023–24	Arizona Coyotes	NHL	80	5	21	26	35	—	—	—	—	—
2024–25	Tampa Bay Lightning	NHL	54	2	12	14	22	5	0	0	0	0
2025–26	Tampa Bay Lightning	NHL	79	7	22	29	69	7	1	2	3	2
NL totals			133	11	36	47	40	14	0	2	2	6
NHL totals			338	25	90	115	177	12	1	2	3	2

=== International ===
Year	Team	Event	Result	GP	G	A	Pts	PIM
2017	Switzerland	IH18	7th	4	0	1	1	0
2018	Switzerland	U18	9th	6	0	0	0	2
2019	Switzerland	WJC	4th	7	0	2	2	2
2019	Switzerland	WC	8th	3	0	0	0	0
2020	Switzerland	WJC	5th	5	0	4	4	2
2021	Switzerland	WC	6th	7	0	2	2	2
2022	Switzerland	WC	5th	8	1	3	4	2
2025	Switzerland	WC	2nd place, silver medalist(s)	10	1	5	6	2
2026	Switzerland	OG	5th	5	1	3	4	4
2026	Switzerland	WC	2nd place, silver medalist(s)	10	0	5	5	4
Junior totals				22	0	7	7	6
Senior totals				43	3	18	21	14
