= Conor Geekie =

Canadian ice hockey player (born 2004)

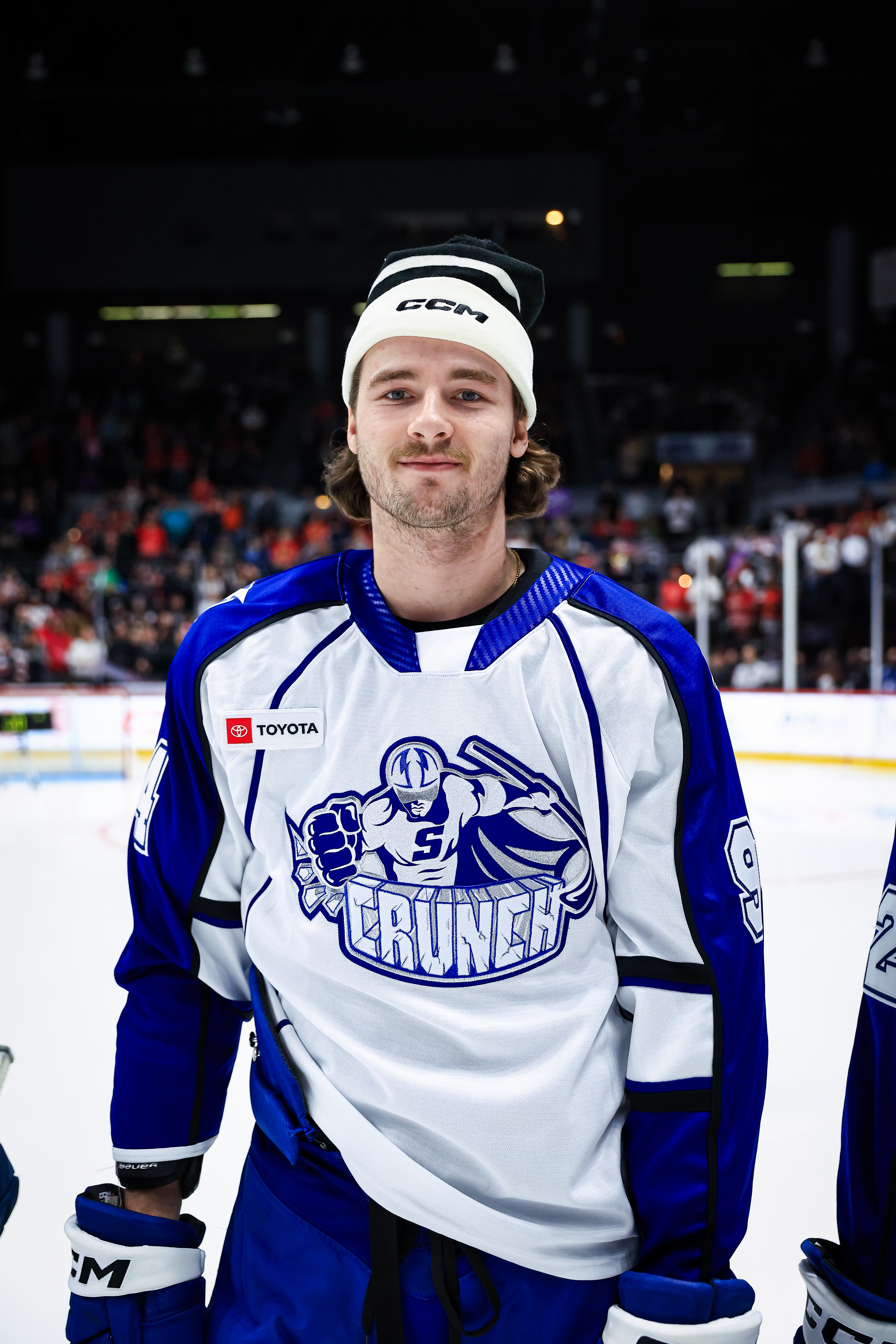
- Geekie with the Syracuse Crunch in 2026
- Born: May 5, 2004 (age 22) Strathclair, Manitoba, Canada
- Height: 6 ft 4 in (193 cm)
- Weight: 203 lb (92 kg; 14 st 7 lb)
- Position: Centre
- Shoots: Left
- NHL team: Tampa Bay Lightning
- NHL draft: 11th overall, 2022; Arizona Coyotes
- Playing career: 2024–present

Conor Geekie (born May 5, 2004) is a Canadian professional ice hockey centre for the Tampa Bay Lightning of the National Hockey League (NHL). He was drafted in the first round, 11th overall, by the Arizona Coyotes in the 2022 NHL entry draft.

== Playing career ==
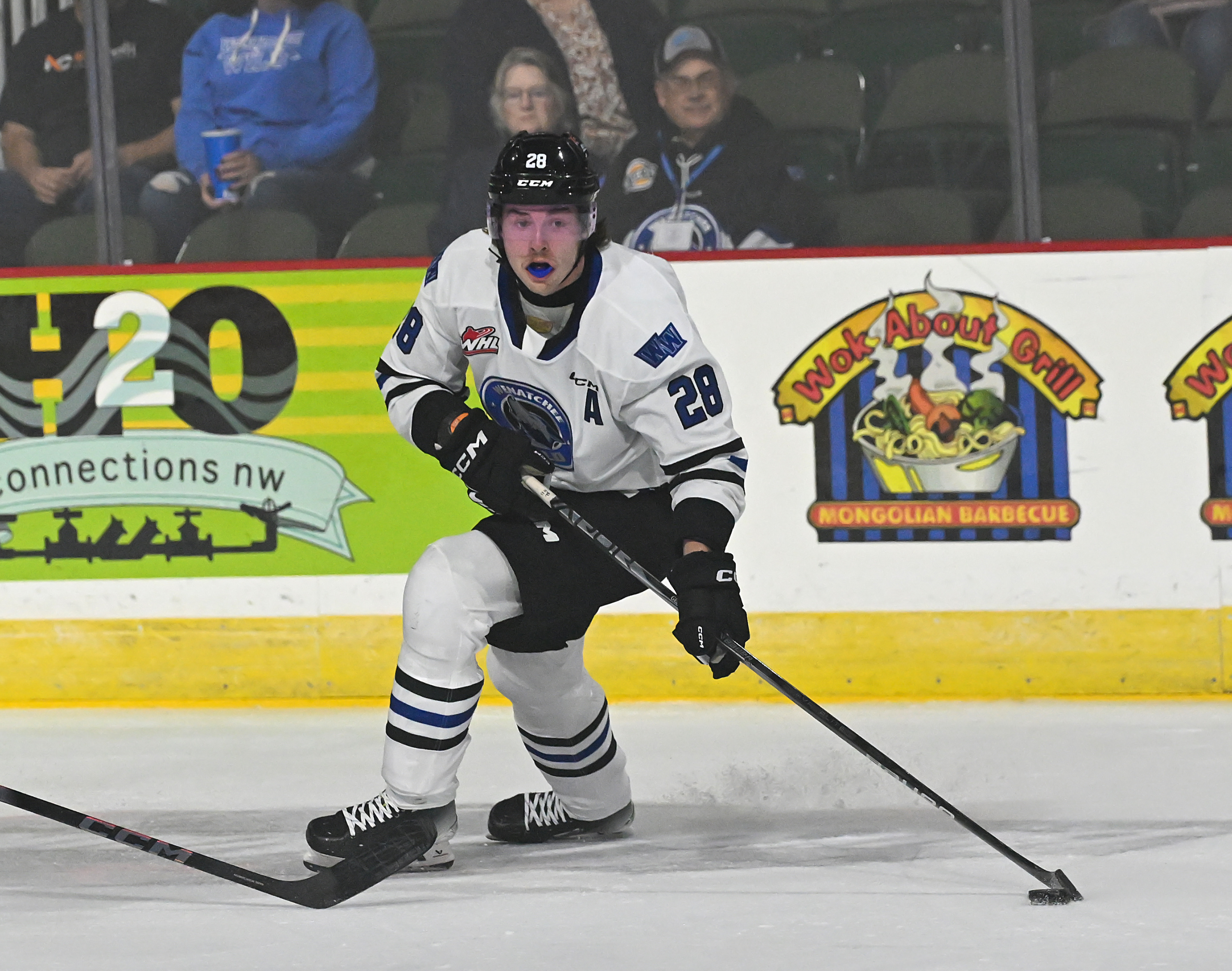
Geekie with the Wenatchee Wild in 2023

Geekie was selected by the Winnipeg Ice in the 2019 Western Hockey League (WHL) Bantam Draft. The Ice held the first overall pick, which they used to select Matthew Savoie, and two other first round picks, which they traded to select Geekie second overall.

Geekie made his WHL debut with a seven game stint in the 2019–20 season. Prior to joining the Ice, he played 18U AAA for the Yellowhead Chiefs, amassing 18 goals and 35 points in 26 games. In the pandemic-delayed 2020–21 season, Geekie's 23 points ranked second among rookies, behind only Connor Bedard.

In his first full-length WHL season in 2021–22, Geekie scored 24 goals and 70 points in 63 games to help Winnipeg to finish first in the league, as well as 11 points in the playoffs before being eliminated in the WHL conference finals. At the 2022 NHL entry draft, the Arizona Coyotes traded the 27th, 34th, and 45th overall picks to the San Jose Sharks for the 11th overall pick, with which they took Geekie. He was one of three first round picks by the Coyotes in 2022, along with Logan Cooley at third overall and Maveric Lamoureux at 29th. On July 18, 2022, Geekie was signed to a three-year, entry-level contract with the Coyotes.

In the 2022–23 season with Winnipeg, Geekie scored 35 goals and 77 points in 66 games. The following year, he remained with the Ice as they moved to Wenatchee, Washington and were rechristened the Wenatchee Wild. On January 4, 2024, Geekie was traded by the Wild to the Swift Current Broncos in exchange for three players and four draft picks, including two first round picks.

Geekie was transferred to the Utah Hockey Club, after the Coyotes became an inactive franchise following the 2023–24 season. However, on June 29, 2024, Geekie was traded along with J. J. Moser, a seventh-round pick (199th overall) in the 2024 NHL entry draft, and a second-round pick in the 2025 NHL entry draft to the Tampa Bay Lightning for defenceman Mikhail Sergachev. Geekie was named to the Lightning's opening night roster for the 2024–25 season, and made his NHL debut on October 11, in a 4–1 win over the Carolina Hurricanes. On October 22, 2024, Geekie recorded his first career NHL assist and point in an 8–5 Lightning win over the New Jersey Devils at the Prudential Center. Geekie scored his first NHL goal against the Washington Capitals on October 26, 2024 at Amalie Arena, in Tampa.

== Personal life ==
Geekie is the younger brother of Boston Bruins forward Morgan Geekie.

== International play ==
At the 2024 World Junior Championship, just 11 seconds into the final group stage match against Germany, Geekie delivered an illegal check to the head on German defenceman Samuel Schindler. Geekie was assessed a five-minute major and was ejected from the game. After a review by tournament officials, he did not face any supplemental discipline.

== Career statistics ==
=== Regular season and playoffs ===
			Regular season					Playoffs
Season	Team	League	GP	G	A	Pts	PIM	GP	G	A	Pts	PIM
2019–20	Yellowhead Chiefs	MU18HL	26	18	17	35	50	4	1	2	3	2
2019–20	Winnipeg Ice	WHL	7	0	0	0	2	—	—	—	—	—
2020–21	Virden Oil Capitals	MJHL	9	1	3	4	20	—	—	—	—	—
2020–21	Winnipeg Ice	WHL	24	9	14	23	20	—	—	—	—	—
2021–22	Winnipeg Ice	WHL	63	24	46	70	49	15	3	8	11	14
2022–23	Winnipeg Ice	WHL	66	35	42	77	53	19	6	11	17	10
2023–24	Wenatchee Wild	WHL	26	20	29	49	28	—	—	—	—	—
2023–24	Swift Current Broncos	WHL	29	23	27	50	38	9	6	3	9	4
2023–24	Tucson Roadrunners	AHL	—	—	—	—	—	2	0	0	0	0
2024–25	Tampa Bay Lightning	NHL	52	8	6	14	16	4	0	1	1	2
2024–25	Syracuse Crunch	AHL	24	11	9	20	22	1	0	0	0	0
2025–26	Tampa Bay Lightning	NHL	14	1	2	3	8	2	0	0	0	2
2025–26	Syracuse Crunch	AHL	57	17	42	59	60	—	—	—	—	—
NHL totals			66	9	8	17	24	6	0	1	1	4

=== International ===
Year	Team	Event	Result	GP	G	A	Pts	PIM
2024	Canada	WJC	5th	5	2	1	3	27
Junior totals				5	2	1	3	27

Awards and achievements
Preceded by Logan Cooley	Arizona Coyotes first-round draft pick 2022	Succeeded by Maveric Lamoureux
