= Mikhail Sergachev =

Russian ice hockey player (born 1998)

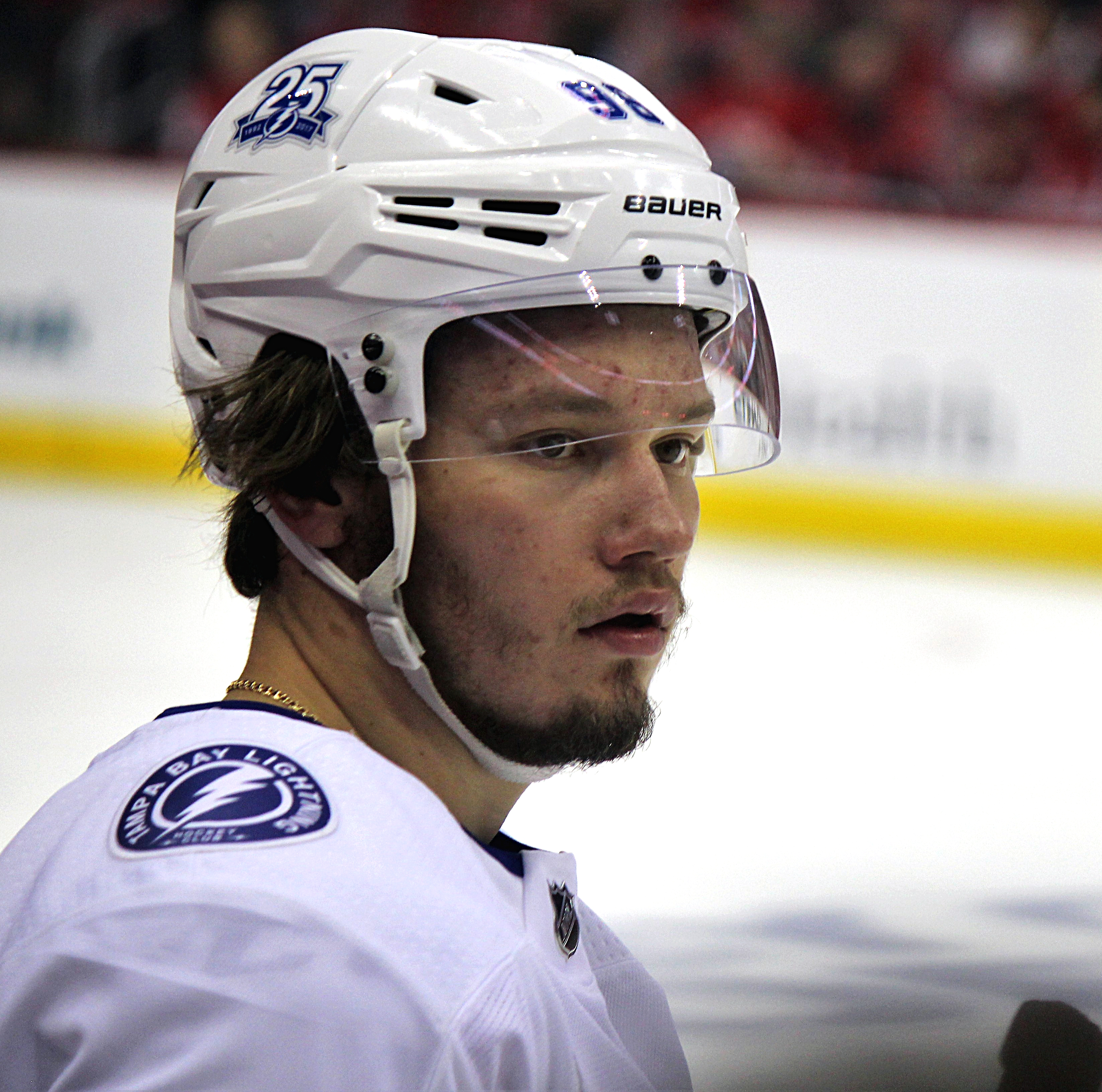
- Sergachev with the Tampa Bay Lightning in May 2018
- Born: 25 June 1998 (age 28) Nizhnekamsk, Russia
- Height: 6 ft 3 in (191 cm)
- Weight: 212 lb (96 kg; 15 st 2 lb)
- Position: Defence
- Shoots: Left
- NHL team Former teams: Utah Mammoth; Montreal Canadiens; Tampa Bay Lightning
- National team: Russia
- NHL draft: 9th overall, 2016; Montreal Canadiens
- Playing career: 2016–present

Mikhail Aleksandrovich Sergachev (Russian: Михаил Александрович Сергачёв, romanized: Mihail Aleksandrovich Sergachyov; born 25 June 1998) is a Russian professional ice hockey player who is a defenceman and alternate captain for the Utah Mammoth of the National Hockey League (NHL). He was selected ninth overall by the Montreal Canadiens in the 2016 NHL entry draft. Sergachev won the Stanley Cup back-to-back with the Tampa Bay Lightning in 2020 and 2021.

== Playing career ==
=== Juniors ===
Sergachev began his junior career in Russia, where he played for Irbis Kazan of the Molodezhnaya Hokkeinaya Liga (MHL). Sergachev was drafted sixth overall in the CHL Import Draft, selected by the Windsor Spitfires of the Ontario Hockey League (OHL). He committed to the Spitfires on 8 July 2015, stating that playing in the OHL offered him the best of chance of achieving his dream of playing in the NHL.

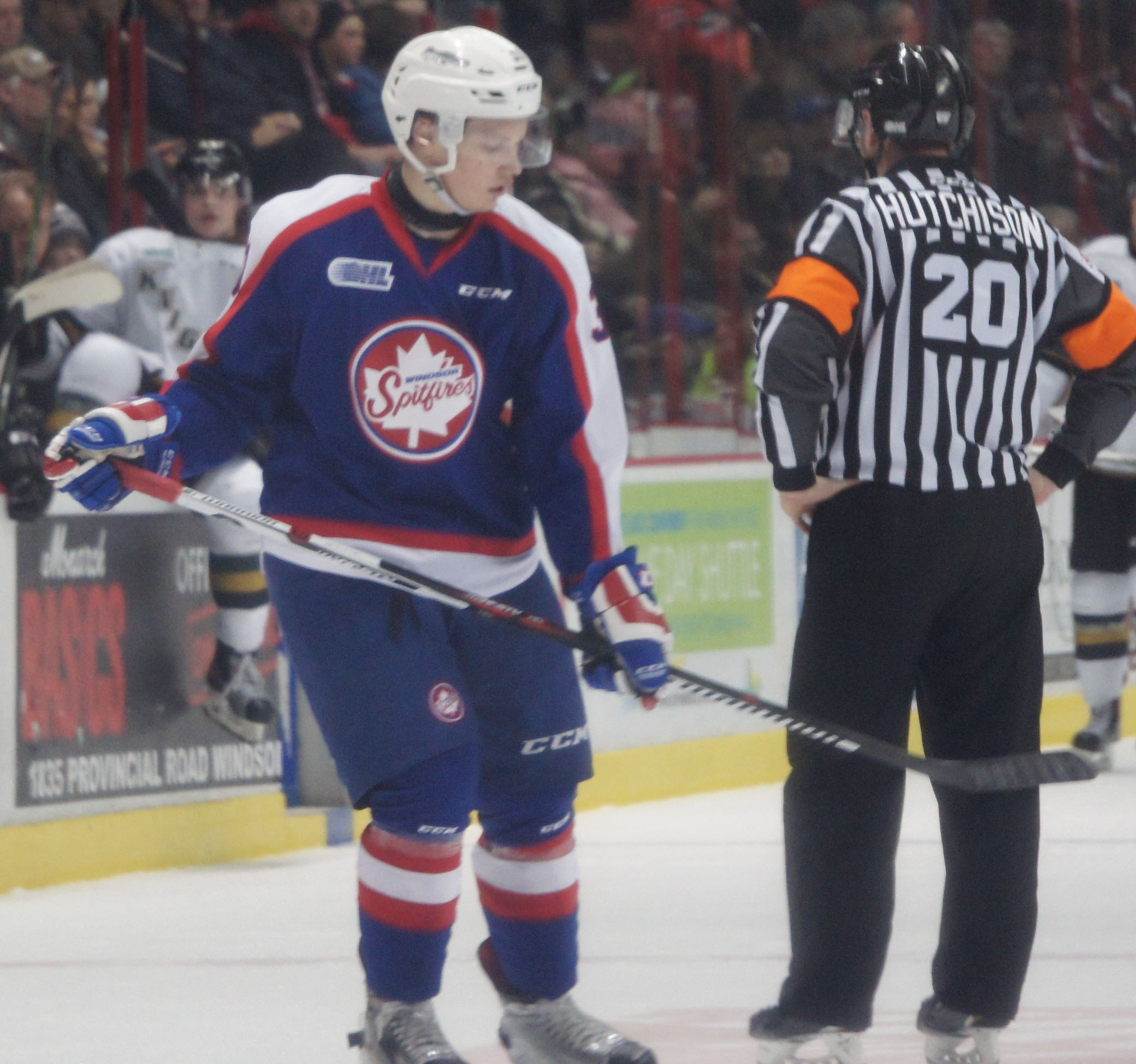
With the Spitfires in January 2016

In his rookie OHL season, Sergachev emerged as a top defenceman, finishing third in scoring amongst defenceman and winning the Max Kaminsky Trophy as the OHL's most outstanding defenceman.

Leading up to the 2016 NHL entry draft, Sergachev was highly regarded by scouts and was considered one of the top defencemen available in the draft. Ultimately, he was selected by the Montreal Canadiens ninth overall, the second defenceman drafted behind Olli Juolevi of the Vancouver Canucks. On 1 July 2016, the Canadiens announced they had signed Sergachev to a three-year, entry-level contract.

On 28 May 2017, Sergachev helped the Windsor Spitfires to capture their third Memorial Cup championship in franchise history. Sergachev was also named as an All-Star of the Memorial Cup tournament.

=== Professional (2016–present) ===
==== Montreal Canadiens (2016–2017) ====
After attending his first Canadiens' training camp, Sergachev impressively made the opening night roster for the 2016–17 season. He made his NHL debut with Montreal in a 4–1 victory over the Buffalo Sabres on 13 October 2016. He appeared in four games with the Canadiens before he was returned to continue his development with junior club, the Windsor Spitfires, on 31 October 2016.

==== Tampa Bay Lightning (2017–2024) ====
On 15 June 2017, the Canadiens traded Sergachev (along with a conditional second-round pick in the 2018 NHL entry draft) to the Tampa Bay Lightning in exchange for forward Jonathan Drouin and a conditional sixth-round draft pick in the same draft.

On 6 October 2017, Sergachev made his Lightning debut, where he also recorded his first career NHL assist and point on a goal by Nikita Kucherov in a 5–3 victory over the visiting Florida Panthers. On 19 October, Sergachev scored his first and second career NHL goals against the Columbus Blue Jackets at Nationwide Arena, which came in a 2–0 Lightning victory. The two goals also made Sergachev the youngest Lightning defenceman (and second-youngest Russian-born defenceman) to record a multi-goal game. On 16 December, Sergachev recorded the game-winning goal in Lightning's 6–5 win over the Colorado Avalanche at the Pepsi Center. This was Sergachev's fifth game-winning goal of the season, which made him the fourth rookie defenceman in NHL history to score five game-winning goals in their rookie season. On 12 April 2018, Sergachev made his Stanley Cup playoff debut in a 5–2 Lightning win over the visiting New Jersey Devils. Sergachev also recorded his first career playoff assist (and point) in the Lightning victory. On 21 April 2018, Sergachev recorded his first career playoff goal in a 3–1 series clinching win over the New Jersey Devils at Amalie Arena. With the goal he also became the youngest player in Lightning history to record a playoff goal.

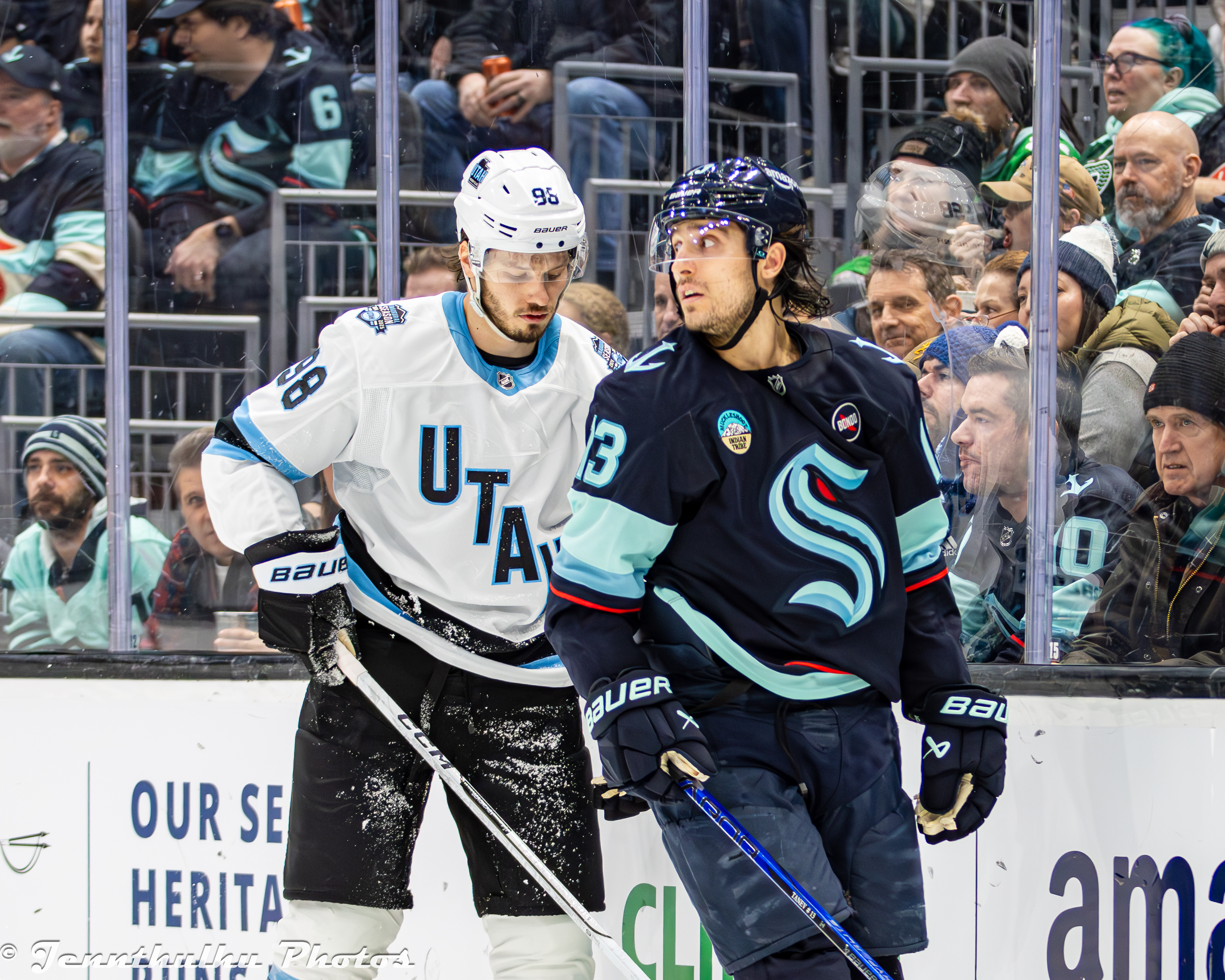
Sergachev (left) while with the Utah Hockey Club in December 2024.

On 13 January 2019, the NHL Department of Player Safety fined Sergachev $2,403.67 for cross-checking Johan Larsson during the game against the Buffalo Sabres the night before at KeyBank Center.

On 26 August 2020, Sergachev recorded a goal and two assists to help the Lightning to a 7–1 Lightning victory over the Boston Bruins in game three of their second round series. Sergachev joined Eric Brewer and Victor Hedman as the only Lightning defensemen to record three points in a single playoff game.

On 25 November 2020, Sergachev signed a three-year, $14.4 million contract with the Lightning.

On 13 July 2022, Sergachev signed an eight-year, $60 million contract extension with the Lightning. His teammates Anthony Cirelli and Erik Černák also signed eight-year extensions with the team that same day.

==== Utah Mammoth (2024–present) ====
On 29 June 2024, the Tampa Bay Lightning traded Sergachev to the Utah Hockey Club (now the Utah Mammoth) for Conor Geekie, J.J. Moser, a 2025 second-round pick, and a 2024 seventh-round pick (no. 199 overall).

== Personal life ==
Sergachev and his wife Liza have one son. They also have a backyard chicken coop at their home in Utah, and he brings the excess eggs to work to give away to his Mammoth teammates.

Sergachev's English language press interviews, and his increasing fluency over the years, have been cited by Canadian author Rachel Reid as the primary inspiration for the speech patterns of her character Ilya Rozanov in her Game Changers novel series, which were later adapted into the television series Heated Rivalry.

== Career statistics ==
=== Regular season and playoffs ===
			Regular season					Playoffs
Season	Team	League	GP	G	A	Pts	PIM	GP	G	A	Pts	PIM
2014–15	Irbis Kazan	MHL	25	2	6	8	18	2	0	0	0	0
2015–16	Windsor Spitfires	OHL	67	17	40	57	56	5	2	3	5	8
2016–17	Windsor Spitfires	OHL	50	10	33	43	71	7	1	2	3	10
2016–17	Montreal Canadiens	NHL	4	0	0	0	0	—	—	—	—	—
2017–18	Tampa Bay Lightning	NHL	79	9	31	40	38	17	2	3	5	12
2018–19	Tampa Bay Lightning	NHL	75	6	26	32	28	4	1	1	2	0
2019–20	Tampa Bay Lightning	NHL	70	10	24	34	58	25	3	7	10	26
2020–21	Tampa Bay Lightning	NHL	56	4	26	30	30	23	0	3	3	18
2021–22	Tampa Bay Lightning	NHL	78	7	31	38	59	23	2	8	10	18
2022–23	Tampa Bay Lightning	NHL	79	10	54	64	53	6	1	2	3	16
2023–24	Tampa Bay Lightning	NHL	34	2	17	19	16	2	0	1	1	0
2024–25	Utah Hockey Club	NHL	77	15	38	53	32	—	—	—	—	—
2025–26	Utah Mammoth	NHL	78	10	49	59	44	6	0	5	5	4
NHL totals			630	73	296	369	358	106	9	30	39	94

Medal record

Men's ice hockey

Representing Russia

World Championships
Bronze medal – third place	2019 Slovakia	

World Junior Championships
Bronze medal – third place	2017 Canada	

=== International ===
Year	Team	Event	Result	GP	G	A	Pts	PIM
2014	Russia	U17	1st place, gold medalist(s)	6	1	0	1	8
2015	Russia	U18	5th	5	0	0	0	0
2016	Russia	U18	6th	5	0	0	0	8
2017	Russia	WJC	3rd place, bronze medalist(s)	7	1	0	1	4
2019	Russia	WC	3rd place, bronze medalist(s)	10	1	6	7	0
Junior totals				23	2	0	2	20
Senior totals				10	1	6	7	0

== Awards and honours ==
Award	Year
OHL
CHL Top Prospects Game	2016
First All-Rookie Team	2016
First All-Star Team	2016
Max Kaminsky Trophy	2016
Memorial Cup champion	2017
Memorial Cup All-Star Team	2017
NHL
Stanley Cup champion	2020, 2021

Awards and achievements
Preceded by Noah Juulsen	Montreal Canadiens first-round draft pick 2016	Succeeded by Ryan Poehling
