= Declan Carlile =

American ice hockey player (born 2000)

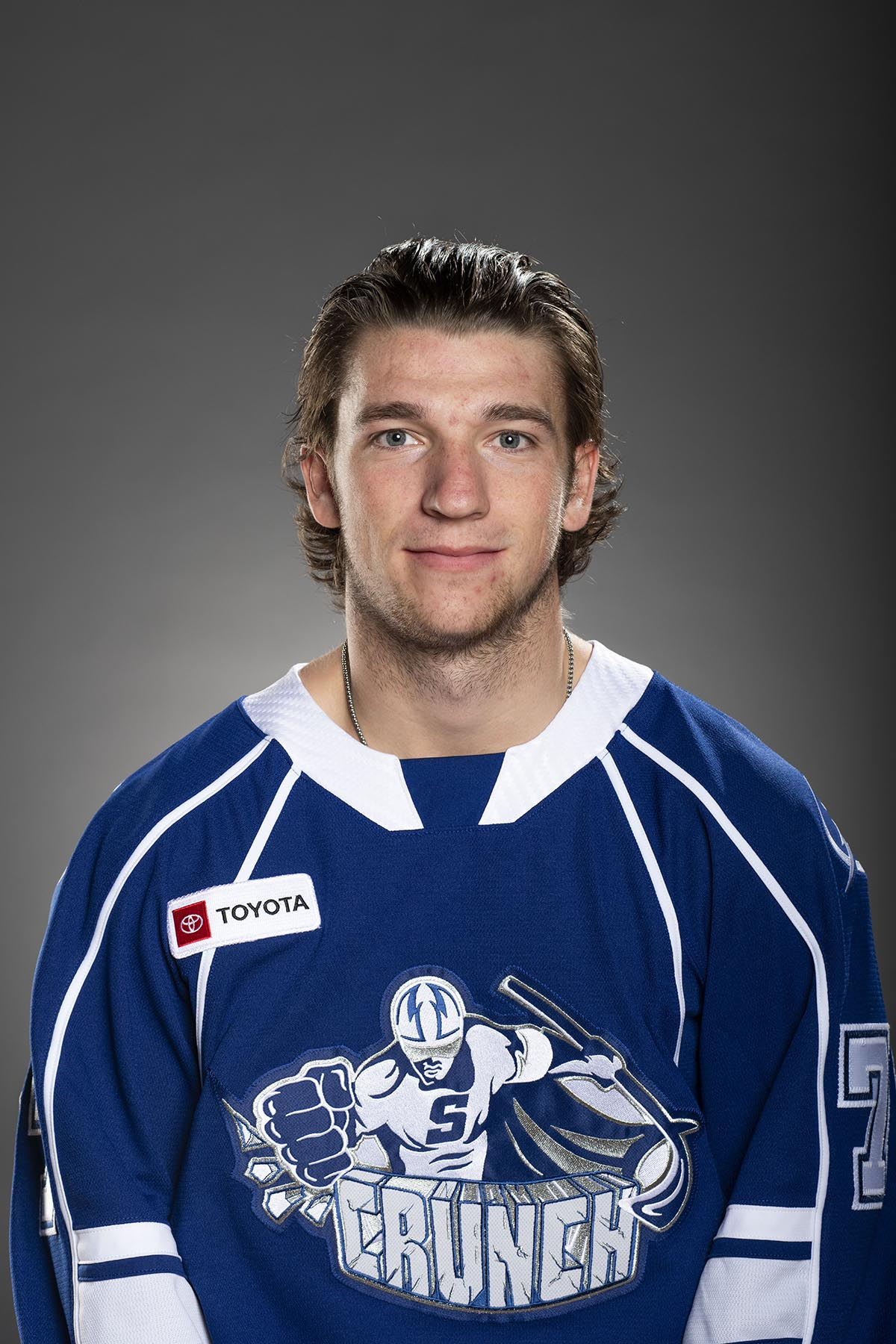
- Carlile with the Syracuse Crunch in 2022
- Born: May 18, 2000 (age 26) Hartland, Michigan, U.S.
- Height: 6 ft 2 in (188 cm)
- Weight: 190 lb (86 kg; 13 st 8 lb)
- Position: Defense
- Shoots: Left
- NHL team Former teams: Pittsburgh Penguins; Tampa Bay Lightning
- National team: United States
- NHL draft: Undrafted
- Playing career: 2022–present

Declan Carlile (born May 18, 2000) is an American professional ice hockey player who is a defenseman for the Pittsburgh Penguins of the National Hockey League (NHL).

== Playing career ==
Carlile was named to the Hockey East All-Rookie team and was a finalist for the Hockey East Rookie of the year award after completing his freshman season with Merrimack College. He would later be named the Merrimack rookie of the year.

On February 1, 2021, Carlile was named as a nominee for the Hobey Baker Award.

Carlile decided to turn pro after three seasons at Merrimack College and going undrafted in the NHL entry draft. Carlile had two years of eligibility remaining to continue playing college hockey.

On March 16, 2022, the Tampa Bay Lightning signed Carlile as an undrafted free agent out of Merrimack College. Carlile posted 13 goals and 56 points in his career with the Warriors.

During the 2023–24 season, on January 4, 2024, Carlile made his NHL debut with the Lightning against the Minnesota Wild at the Xcel Energy Center. The Lightning defeated the Wild 4–1 that night.

On June 6, 2024, Carlile signed a two-year, two-way contract extension with the Lightning.

On December 14, 2024, Carlile scored his first NHL goal, against Seattle Kraken goaltender Philipp Grubauer in a 5–1 Lightning win.

After four seasons within the Lightning organization, Carlile left as a free agent and was signed to a two-year, $3 million contract with the Pittsburgh Penguins on July 1, 2026.

== International play ==
Carlile represented the United States national team at the 2026 IIHF World Championship.

== Personal life ==
Carlile's father is Canadian.

Carlile got engaged to his fiancée, Rachel, in June 2026.

== Career statistics ==
=== Regular season and playoffs ===
			Regular season					Playoffs
Season	Team	League	GP	G	A	Pts	PIM	GP	G	A	Pts	PIM
2018–19	Lincoln Stars	USHL	32	3	11	14	35	—	—	—	—	—
2018–19	Muskegon Lumberjacks	USHL	27	1	4	5	26	8	0	2	2	16
2019–20	Merrimack College	HE	34	4	18	22	22	—	—	—	—	—
2020–21	Merrimack College	HE	14	2	8	10	10	—	—	—	—	—
2021–22	Merrimack College	HE	35	7	17	24	8	—	—	—	—	—
2021–22	Syracuse Crunch	AHL	10	1	2	3	2	4	0	0	0	2
2022–23	Syracuse Crunch	AHL	69	8	16	24	39	5	2	0	2	4
2023–24	Syracuse Crunch	AHL	61	7	20	27	26	8	1	4	5	4
2023–24	Tampa Bay Lightning	NHL	1	0	0	0	0	—	—	—	—	—
2024–25	Syracuse Crunch	AHL	55	6	10	16	52	—	—	—	—	—
2024–25	Tampa Bay Lightning	NHL	3	1	0	1	0	—	—	—	—	—
2025–26	Syracuse Crunch	AHL	16	2	9	11	27	—	—	—	—	—
2025–26	Tampa Bay Lightning	NHL	42	1	2	3	40	2	0	0	0	0
NHL totals			46	2	2	4	40	2	0	0	0	0

=== International ===
Year	Team	Event	Result	GP	G	A	Pts	PIM
2026	United States	WC	8th	5	1	2	3	0
Senior totals				5	1	2	3	0
