= Steven Santini =

American ice hockey player (born 1995)

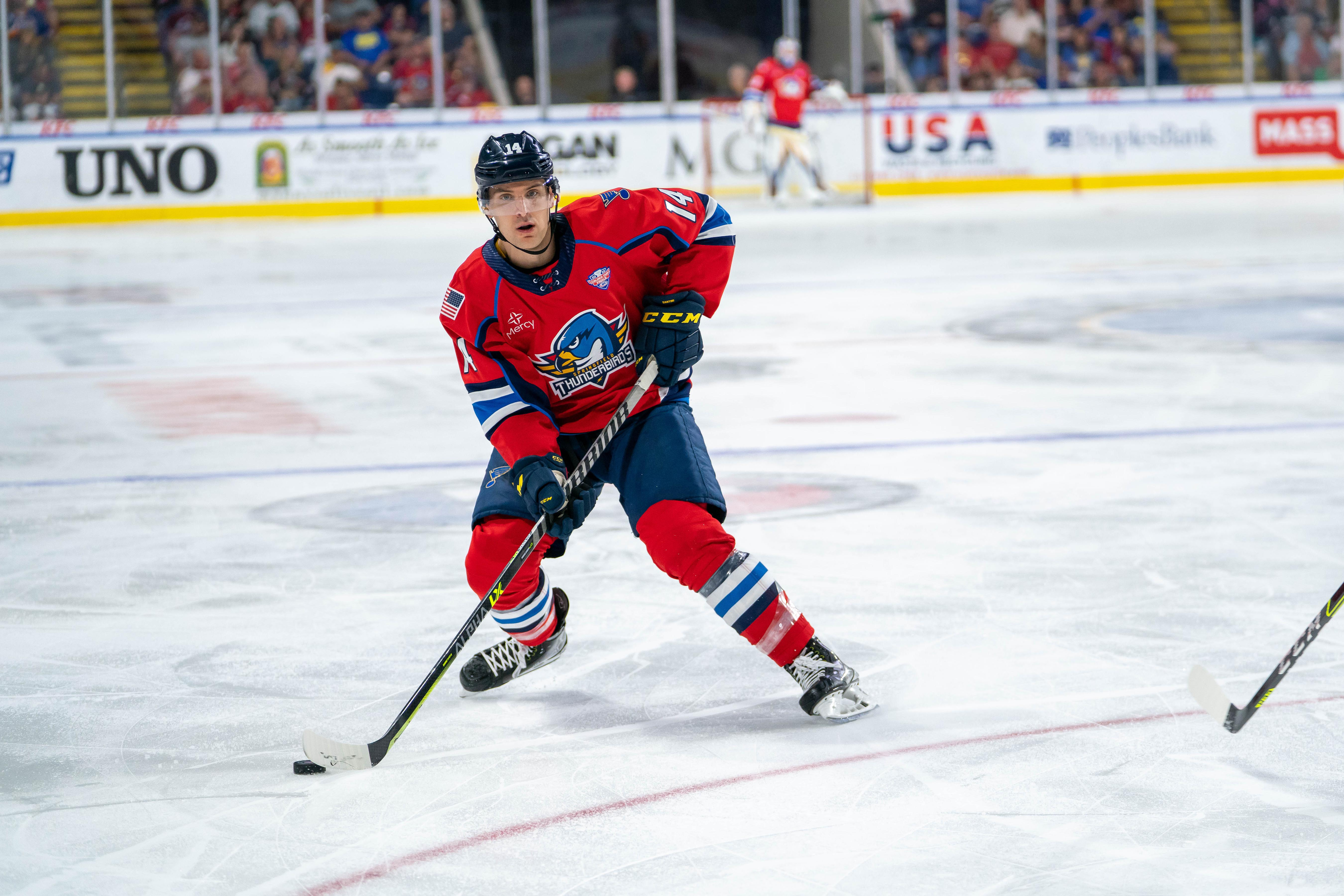
- Born: March 7, 1995 (age 31) Bronxville, New York, U.S.
- Height: 6 ft 2 in (188 cm)
- Weight: 207 lb (94 kg; 14 st 11 lb)
- Position: Defense
- Shoots: Right
- NHL team (P) Cur. team Former teams: Tampa Bay Lightning; Syracuse Crunch (AHL); New Jersey Devils; Nashville Predators; St. Louis Blues
- National team: United States
- NHL draft: 42nd overall, 2013; New Jersey Devils
- Playing career: 2016–present

Steven Michael Santini (born March 7, 1995) is an American professional ice hockey defenseman and captain of the Syracuse Crunch of the American Hockey League (AHL) while under contract to the Tampa Bay Lightning of the National Hockey League (NHL). He has also played for the New Jersey Devils and the Nashville Predators. He played for the Boston College Eagles men's ice hockey team of the NCAA Hockey East conference. Santini was selected by the New Jersey Devils in the 2nd round (42nd overall) of the 2013 NHL entry draft.

== Playing career ==
=== Amateur ===
Santini spent his first two years of high school at John F. Kennedy Catholic High School in Somers, New York before moving to Ann Arbor, Michigan to participate in the USA Hockey National Team Development Program.

As a youth, Santini played in the 2008 Quebec International Pee-Wee Hockey Tournament with the New York Rangers minor ice hockey team.

Santini was rated as a top prospect who had been projected as a first round selection of the 2013 NHL entry draft. He trained with the USA Hockey National Team Development Program team from 2011 to 2013, and won a Silver Medal with Team USA at the 2013 IIHF World U18 Championships where he was named the tournament's best defenseman.

In his first season at Boston College, Santini earned his role as a top-4 defensemen with the Eagles, garnering a reputation as a hard-hitting, shut-down defenseman, while also producing 3 goals and 11 points on the season. He was named to Hockey East's All-Rookie team. He also played at the 2014 World Juniors for the United States.

Santini started his sophomore campaign paired with freshman Noah Hanifin as the top-2 defenseman for the Eagles, however, he only played in four games to start the season before being shut down due to a wrist injury. He underwent surgery, missed 16 games and returned to the lineup after the New Year's break.

He scored one goal and assisted on 19 as a junior, while helping the BC Eagles to a Frozen Four appearance where they fell short to Quinnipiac.

=== Professional ===
He signed a three-year entry-level deal with the New Jersey Devils of the National Hockey League on April 9, 2016. He played his first NHL game later that night against the Toronto Maple Leafs.

Santini scored his first NHL point in his 2016–17 NHL debut, during a 3-0 win over the Boston Bruins on January 2, 2017. He scored his first NHL goal on January 12, 2017, against the Edmonton Oilers, due to a puck deflecting off his elbow. The Devils ended up losing in overtime 3–2.

As a restricted free agent, Santini signed a three-year, $4.25 million contract with the Devils on August 14, 2018.

On June 22, 2019, Santini was traded by the Devils along with prospect Jérémy Davies and draft picks to the Nashville Predators in exchange for P. K. Subban. In the following 2019–20 season, Santini struggled to make an impression with the Predators, appearing in just 2 games over the course of the season while playing the majority of the campaign in the AHL with affiliate, the Milwaukee Admirals.

On October 7, 2020, Santini was placed on unconditional waivers by the Predators for the purpose to buyout the remaining year of his contract. On October 10, Santini signed as a free agent to a one-year, two-way contract with the St. Louis Blues.

Following three seasons within the Blues organization, Santini left as a free agent and was signed to a one-year, two-way contract with the Los Angeles Kings on July 1, 2023. In the 2023–24 season, Santini played exclusively with the Kings AHL affiliate, the Ontario Reign, placing second on the team in scoring from the blueline with 5 goals and 20 points through 64 regular season games.

Leaving the Kings at the conclusion of his contract, Santini was signed to a one-year, two-way contract with the Tampa Bay Lightning on July 1, 2024.

== Personal life ==
Santini's grandfather, Bob, coached hockey at Mount Saint Michael Academy in the Bronx and founded the Catholic High School Hockey League which became part of New York's Catholic High School Athletic Association. Santini's father, Steve, played college hockey at Maine and his uncle, Rob, played at Iona. Steve and Rob later opened Brewster Ice Arena in Brewster, New York where Santini grew up playing hockey. Santini's three sisters also attended John F. Kennedy Catholic High School.

Santini is Catholic and his decision to attend Boston College was based in part on its being a Jesuit institution.

== Career statistics ==
=== Regular season and playoffs ===
			Regular season					Playoffs
Season	Team	League	GP	G	A	Pts	PIM	GP	G	A	Pts	PIM
2009–10	Brewster Bulldogs	EmJHL	17	1	5	6	42	—	—	—	—	—
2010–11	New York Apple Core	EJHL	44	3	14	17	26	5	0	1	1	0
2011–12	U.S. National Development Team	USHL	36	1	4	5	41	2	0	1	1	0
2012–13	U.S. National Development Team	USHL	25	0	5	5	6	—	—	—	—	—
2013–14	Boston College	HE	35	3	8	11	52	—	—	—	—	—
2014–15	Boston College	HE	22	1	4	5	20	—	—	—	—	—
2015–16	Boston College	HE	41	1	18	19	50	—	—	—	—	—
2015–16	New Jersey Devils	NHL	1	0	0	0	2	—	—	—	—	—
2016–17	New Jersey Devils	NHL	38	2	5	7	14	—	—	—	—	—
2016–17	Albany Devils	AHL	20	0	2	2	35	4	0	2	2	0
2017–18	New Jersey Devils	NHL	36	2	8	10	21	—	—	—	—	—
2017–18	Binghamton Devils	AHL	27	3	3	6	8	—	—	—	—	—
2018–19	New Jersey Devils	NHL	39	1	3	4	16	—	—	—	—	—
2018–19	Binghamton Devils	AHL	3	0	0	0	0	—	—	—	—	—
2019–20	Milwaukee Admirals	AHL	54	2	10	12	39	—	—	—	—	—
2019–20	Nashville Predators	NHL	2	0	0	0	2	—	—	—	—	—
2020–21	Utica Comets	AHL	5	1	1	2	4	—	—	—	—	—
2020–21	St. Louis Blues	NHL	3	0	1	1	0	2	0	0	0	0
2021–22	Springfield Thunderbirds	AHL	66	2	16	18	24	18	1	4	5	24
2021–22	St. Louis Blues	NHL	—	—	—	—	—	1	0	0	0	0
2022–23	Springfield Thunderbirds	AHL	64	2	8	10	32	2	0	0	0	0
2022–23	St. Louis Blues	NHL	4	0	1	1	2	—	—	—	—	—
2023–24	Ontario Reign	AHL	64	5	15	20	24	8	0	0	0	2
2024–25	Syracuse Crunch	AHL	58	6	11	17	20	3	0	1	1	0
2024–25	Tampa Bay Lightning	NHL	1	0	0	0	0	—	—	—	—	—
2025–26	Syracuse Crunch	AHL	33	0	6	6	10	4	0	0	0	6
2025–26	Tampa Bay Lightning	NHL	12	0	1	1	2	—	—	—	—	—
NHL totals			136	5	19	24	59	3	0	0	0	0

=== International ===
Year	Team	Event	Result	GP	G	A	Pts	PIM
2012	United States	U17	2nd place, silver medalist(s)	5	1	0	1	16
2013	United States	U18	2nd place, silver medalist(s)	7	0	0	0	0
2014	United States	WJC	5th	5	1	0	1	4
2016	United States	WC	4th	10	0	0	0	2
Junior totals				17	2	0	2	20
Senior totals				10	0	0	0	2

== Awards and honours ==
Award	Year
College
All-Hockey East Rookie Team	2013–14
Hockey East Best Defensive Defenseman	2015–16
International
IIHF World U18 Championship Best Defenseman	2013

Awards and achievements
Preceded by Mike Paliotta	Hockey East Best Defensive Defenseman; 2015–16	Succeeded by Dennis Gilbert
