= Brandon Halverson =

American ice hockey player (born 1996)

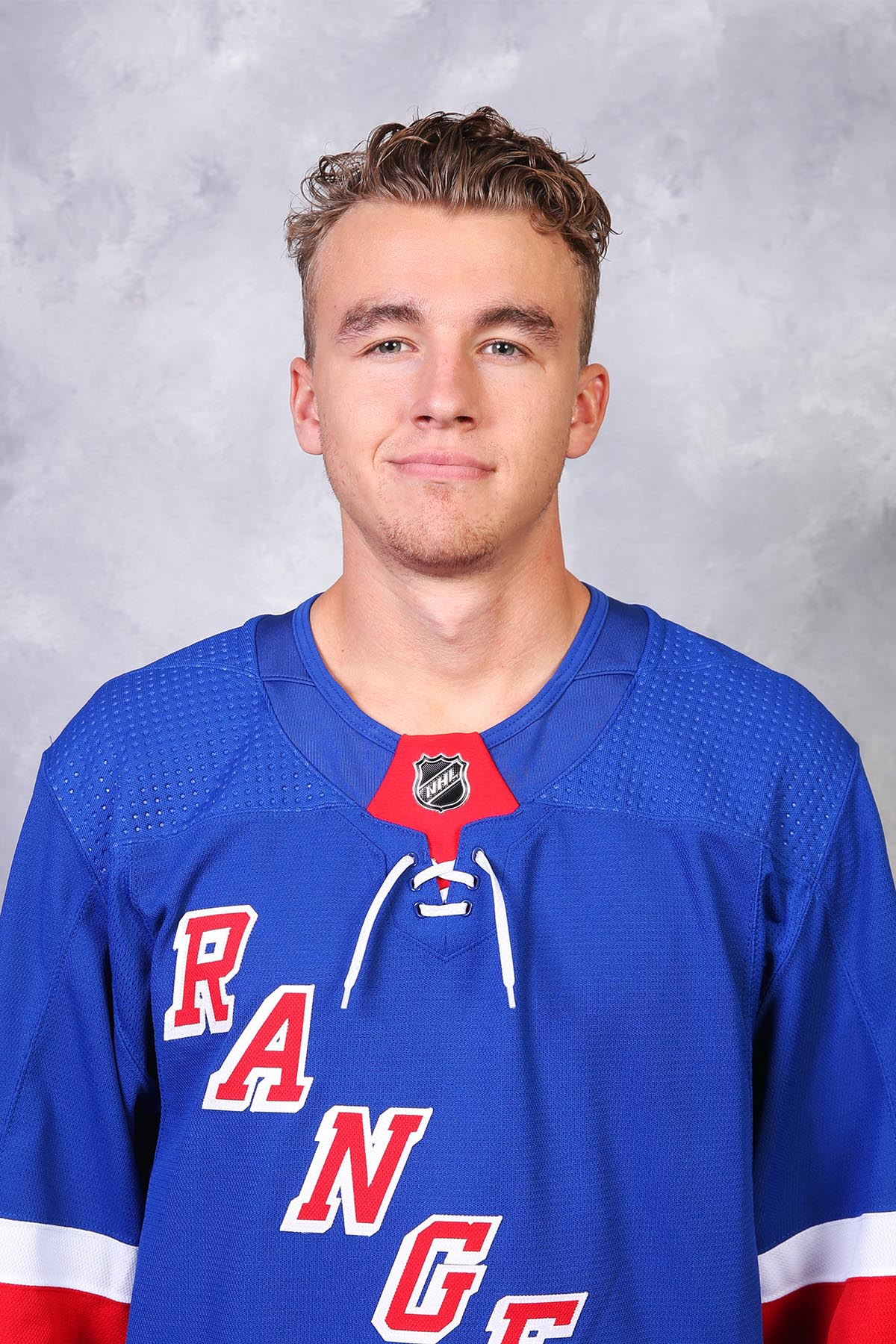
- Halverson with the New York Rangers in 2018
- Born: March 29, 1996 (age 30) Traverse City, Michigan, U.S.
- Height: 6 ft 5 in (196 cm)
- Weight: 235 lb (107 kg; 16 st 11 lb)
- Position: Goaltender
- Catches: Left
- NHL team (P) Cur. team Former teams: Dallas Stars; Texas Stars (AHL); New York Rangers; Tampa Bay Lightning
- NHL draft: 59th overall, 2014; New York Rangers
- Playing career: 2016–present

Brandon Halverson (born March 29, 1996) is an American professional ice hockey goaltender for the Texas Stars of the American Hockey League (AHL), while under contract with the Dallas Stars of the National Hockey League (NHL). He was selected by the New York Rangers 59th overall in the 2014 NHL entry draft.

== Playing career ==
Halverson played major junior hockey with the Sault Ste. Marie Greyhounds of the Ontario Hockey League (OHL). On July 2, 2015, the New York Rangers signed Halverson to an entry-level contract.

During the 2017–18 season, on February 17, 2018, Halverson made his NHL debut with the Rangers, stopping five shots and allowing one goal, in a 6–3 loss to the Ottawa Senators in relief of Henrik Lundqvist, who had been pulled from the game after allowing five goals on 27 shots.

Following the conclusion of his entry-level contract, Halverson was not tendered a qualifying offer, releasing him as a free agent from the Rangers. Leading into the 2019–20 season, Halverson continued in the ECHL, securing a contract with the Norfolk Admirals on October 4, 2019. Halverson made 19 appearances with the Admirals collecting five wins, while also loaned to the AHL with the Providence Bruins and Tucson Roadrunners, appearing in two games with the latter.

As a free agent, Halverson opted to continue in the ECHL, securing a contract with the Wheeling Nailers on November 27, 2020. Limited to just four games with the Nailers in the 2020–21 season, Halverson left the club as a free agent and agreed to join fellow ECHL outfit, the Florida Everblades, on September 4, 2021. He was later released from his contract with the Everblades prior to the 2021–22 season.

Halverson missed a season due to a broken wrist.

Spending most of the 2024–25 season with the Syracuse Crunch in the AHL, Halverson was a co-recipient of the Harry "Hap" Holmes Memorial Award, the Crunch and the Laval Rocket having tied for the fewest goals allowed in the league. He had a 22–11–8 record in 43 appearances for the Crunch, with a 2.22 goals-against average, and a .915 save percentage. He also made one appearance in goal for the Tampa Bay Lightning on March 22, 2025.During the 2025–26 season, Halverson set the Crunch franchise record in shutouts with his twelfth career shutout with the team.

As a free agent from the Lightning, Halverson was signed to a one-year, two-way contract with the Dallas Stars for the 2026–27 season on July 1, 2026.

== Career statistics ==
=== Regular season and playoffs ===
			Regular season									Playoffs
Season	Team	League	GP	W	L	OT	MIN	GA	SO	GAA	SV%	GP	W	L	MIN	GA	SO	GAA	SV%
2012–13	Oakland Jr. Grizzlies	T1EHL	21	9	9	2	1069	57	0	2.88	.906	4	2	2	209	6	0	1.46	.953
2013–14	Sault Ste. Marie Greyhounds	OHL	19	12	6	1	1136	56	2	2.96	.904	—	—	—	—	—	—	—	—
2014–15	Sault Ste. Marie Greyhounds	OHL	50	40	5	2	2784	122	6	2.63	.913	14	10	4	796	39	1	2.94	.893
2015–16	Sault Ste. Marie Greyhounds	OHL	43	20	17	4	2517	126	0	3.00	.907	12	5	7	744	40	0	3.23	.905
2016–17	Greenville Swamp Rabbits	ECHL	9	4	5	0	471	27	1	3.43	.897	—	—	—	—	—	—	—	—
2016–17	Hartford Wolf Pack	AHL	26	9	16	0	1443	83	0	3.45	.887	—	—	—	—	—	—	—	—
2017–18	Greenville Swamp Rabbits	ECHL	24	8	11	3	1330	83	0	3.74	.902	—	—	—	—	—	—	—	—
2017–18	Hartford Wolf Pack	AHL	5	1	4	0	298	17	0	3.42	.906	—	—	—	—	—	—	—	—
2017–18	New York Rangers	NHL	1	0	0	0	13	1	0	4.78	.833	—	—	—	—	—	—	—	—
2018–19	Maine Mariners	ECHL	30	15	13	1	1750	78	1	2.67	.924	—	—	—	—	—	—	—	—
2018–19	Hartford Wolf Pack	AHL	19	8	8	3	1075	57	0	3.18	.893	—	—	—	—	—	—	—	—
2019–20	Norfolk Admirals	ECHL	19	5	11	3	1148	63	0	3.29	.904	—	—	—	—	—	—	—	—
2019–20	Tucson Roadrunners	AHL	2	0	1	1	38	5	0	7.90	.762	—	—	—	—	—	—	—	—
2020–21	Wheeling Nailers	ECHL	4	0	3	0	213	15	0	4.23	.860	—	—	—	—	—	—	—	—
2022–23	Bayreuth Tigers	DEL2	17	6	10	0	1018	60	0	3.54	.909	3	0	3	176	9	0	3.09	.902
2023–24	Orlando Solar Bears	ECHL	32	14	12	4	1785	84	1	2.82	.913	—	—	—	—	—	—	—	—
2023–24	Syracuse Crunch	AHL	14	7	3	3	715	26	1	2.18	.913	7	3	4	466	17	0	2.19	.916
2024–25	Syracuse Crunch	AHL	43	22	11	8	2436	90	5	2.22	.915	3	0	3	171	9	0	3.15	.883
2024–25	Tampa Bay Lightning	NHL	1	0	1	0	58	5	0	5.18	.792	—	—	—	—	—	—	—	—
2025–26	Syracuse Crunch	AHL	43	24	11	6	2509	101	5	2.42	.905	4	1	2	276	7	0	1.52	.947
2025–26	Tampa Bay Lightning	NHL	2	0	1	0	56	4	0	4.22	.810	—	—	—	—	—	—	—	—
NHL totals			4	0	2	0	127	6	0	4.71	.804	—	—	—	—	—	—	—	—

=== International ===
Year	Team	Event	Result	GP	W	L	OT	MIN	GA	SO	GAA	SV%
2015	United States	WJC	5th	1	1	0	0	60	0	1	0.00	1.000
2016	United States	WJC	3rd place, bronze medalist(s)	2	1	0	0	92	1	0	0.65	.972
Junior totals				3	2	0	0	152	1	1	0.39	.980
