= 2024–25 NHL season =

National Hockey League season

- League: National Hockey League
- Sport: Ice hockey
- Duration: October 4, 2024 – June 17, 2025
- Games: 82
- Teams: 32
- TV partner(s): Sportsnet/SN1/SN360, Citytv, CBC, TVA Sports (Canada); ESPN/ABC/ESPN2, TNT/TBS/truTV (United States)
- Streaming partner(s): Sportsnet+, Amazon Prime Video (Canada); ESPN+/Hulu/Disney+, Max (United States)

Draft
- Top draft pick: Macklin Celebrini
- Picked by: San Jose Sharks

Regular season
- Presidents' Trophy: Winnipeg Jets
- Season MVP: Connor Hellebuyck (Jets)
- Top scorer: Nikita Kucherov (Lightning)

Playoffs
- Playoffs MVP: Sam Bennett (Panthers)

Stanley Cup
- Champions: Florida Panthers
- Runners-up: Edmonton Oilers

NHL seasons
- 2023–24 2025–26

The 2024–25 NHL season was the 108th season of operation (107th season of play) of the National Hockey League (NHL). The regular season started on October 4, 2024, when the Buffalo Sabres and New Jersey Devils played the first of two games in Prague, Czech Republic, as a part of the 2024 NHL Global Series. The Stanley Cup playoffs began on April 19, 2025 and ended on June 17, with the Florida Panthers winning back-to-back Stanley Cups. This season was the first for the expansion Utah Hockey Club (officially named the Utah Mammoth at the close of the 2024–25 regular season), who were established with the hockey assets of the Arizona Coyotes following the latter team's deactivation.

== League business ==
=== Utah expansion and Arizona Coyotes deactivation ===
On April 13, 2024, it was reported that, with the NHL's permission, the Arizona Coyotes were making efforts to relocate to Salt Lake City, Utah, following concerns about an indefinite timeframe on a new arena and the effects of continued play at the 4,600-seat Mullett Arena. The sale, which involved the NHL buying the franchise from Coyotes owner Alex Meruelo, then reselling it to Ryan Smith, owner of the Utah Jazz of the National Basketball Association (NBA), was finalized on April 18, after the NHL Board of Governors voted to establish a team in Utah, with the Coyotes' hockey assets; however, rather than formally relocate, the Coyotes franchise was instead marked "inactive", with the Utah Hockey Club considered an expansion team in a similar situation to the Cleveland Browns and Baltimore Ravens of the National Football League (NFL). Meruelo subsequently remained on the NHL Board of Governors as an observer, retaining the rights to the Coyotes brand with a five-year window to complete a new arena and "reactivate" the Coyotes as an expansion team. Of the reported US$1.2 billion sale price, 1 billion was paid to Meruelo, with $200 million paid to the NHL's other owners as a relocation fee. In June, the auction was canceled, and Meruelo left the ownership, ceasing the Coyotes. The league has not yet indicated whether the Coyotes would fold outright, the league would keep the franchise inactive for a prospective new Arizona owner, or transfer its history, records and intellectual property to the Utah Hockey Club.

The Utah Hockey Club played its inaugural season without an official name, mascot, or colors, while a full identity was developed in time for 2025–26. After being leaked the previous week, the team officially announced its permanent branding as the Utah Mammoth on May 7, 2025.

=== Rule changes ===
On June 26, 2024, the league announced that following rule changes for the 2024–25 season:

- The puck-over-glass delay-of-game penalty has been added to the list of plays that can go under video review. This only applies to determine whether the puck instead deflected off a player, stick, the glass or the boards. The judgment call on how the puck left the defensive zone cannot be reviewed. A failed coach's challenge would thus essentially result in a double-minor: both the original puck-over-glass penalty and the failed coach's challenge penalty.
- The defensive team cannot make a line change after its goaltender accidentally dislodges the net.
- Following an icing, offensive centers receive a warning for a faceoff violation, just like defensive players.
- A team that has players sitting on the boards with their skates exposed on the play first receive a warning, and then be assessed an unsportsmanlike conduct bench minor penalty for subsequent violations.

=== Entry draft ===
The 2024 NHL entry draft took place on June 28–29, 2024, at the Sphere in Paradise, Nevada.

=== Salary cap ===
The salary cap ceiling was increased to US$88 million per team for 2024–25, an increase of US$4.5 million from the previous season. The salary cap floor was increased to US$65 million per team.

== Coaching changes ==
Coaching changes
Off-season
Team	2023–24 coach	2024–25 coach	Notes
Buffalo Sabres	Don Granato	Lindy Ruff	On April 16, 2024, one day after the conclusion of their season, the Sabres fired Granato. In just over three-and-a-half seasons with Buffalo, Granato totaled a 122–125–27 record, with no playoff appearances. Ruff, who had previously coached Buffalo from 1997 to 2013, and most recently served as head coach of the New Jersey Devils from 2020 to 2024, was named head coach on April 22.
Columbus Blue Jackets	Pascal Vincent	Dean Evason	On June 17, 2024, two months after the conclusion of the Blue Jackets' season, Vincent was fired by Columbus. In his single season as head coach, the Blue Jackets posted a 27–43–12 record, finishing last in the Metropolitan Division. Evason, most recently the head coach of the Minnesota Wild from 2020 to 2024, was named head coach on July 22.
Los Angeles Kings	Todd McLellan; Jim Hiller*	Jim Hiller	McLellan was fired on February 2, 2024, with the Kings holding a record of 23–15–10; despite a 20–7–4 start to the season, the team went 3–8–6 in the 17 games preceding his dismissal. In four and a half seasons with Los Angeles, McLellan posted a 164–130–44 record, reaching the playoffs twice but failing to advance past the first round. Hiller, an assistant coach, was promoted to interim head coach, before being named full-time head coach on May 22.
New Jersey Devils	Lindy Ruff; Travis Green*	Sheldon Keefe	Ruff was fired on March 4, 2024, after the Devils started 30–27–4. In just over three-and-a-half seasons with New Jersey, Ruff totaled a 128–125–28 record, with one playoff appearance. Green, the associate coach, and previously head coach of the Vancouver Canucks from 2017 to 2021, was promoted to interim head coach the same day. Green finished out the season 8–12–1, failing to make the playoffs, and was subsequently hired by the Ottawa Senators following the season. Keefe, most recently the head coach of the Toronto Maple Leafs from 2019 to 2024, was named head coach on May 23.
Ottawa Senators	D. J. Smith; Jacques Martin*	Travis Green	Smith was fired on December 18, 2023, after the Senators started the season 11–15–0. In just over four seasons with Ottawa, Smith compiled a 131–154–32 record, with no playoff appearances. Martin, a senior advisor to the coaching staff who previously served as the team's head coach from 1996 to 2004, and most recently served as head coach of the Montreal Canadiens from 2009 to 2011, was promoted to interim head coach. Martin subsequently finished out the season 26–26–4, failing to reach the playoffs. Green, most recently the interim head coach of the New Jersey Devils, and previously head coach of the Vancouver Canucks from 2017 to 2021, was named head coach on May 7, 2024.
San Jose Sharks	David Quinn	Ryan Warsofsky	On April 24, 2024, one week after the conclusion of their season, the Sharks fired Quinn. In two seasons with San Jose, Quinn posted a 41–98–25 record, with no playoff appearances. Warsofsky, an assistant coach, was promoted to head coach on June 13.
Seattle Kraken	Dave Hakstol	Dan Bylsma	Hakstol was fired on April 29, 2024, a week and a half after the conclusion of Seattle's season. The franchise's first head coach, Hakstol recorded a 107–112–27 record in three seasons with the Kraken, leading the franchise to its first playoff appearance in 2023. Bylsma, most recently head coach of Seattle's American Hockey League (AHL) affiliate, the Coachella Valley Firebirds, and previously head coach of the Pittsburgh Penguins and Buffalo Sabres, was promoted to head coach on May 28.
St. Louis Blues	Craig Berube; Drew Bannister*	Drew Bannister	Berube was fired on December 12, 2023, after the Blues started the season 13–14–1. In parts of six seasons with St. Louis, Berube compiled a 206–132–44 record with four playoff appearances, leading the franchise to its first Stanley Cup championship in 2019. Bannister, previously the head coach of the Blues' AHL affiliate, the Springfield Thunderbirds, was promoted to interim head coach, before signing a two-year contract to become the full-time head coach on May 7, 2024.
Toronto Maple Leafs	Sheldon Keefe	Craig Berube	On May 9, 2024, five days following Toronto's first-round elimination from the 2024 Stanley Cup playoffs, Keefe was fired after four-and-a-half seasons with the team. Under Keefe, the team went 212–97–40, winning the North Division title in 2021 and making the playoffs every season, but only reaching the second round once. Berube, most recently head coach of the St. Louis Blues from 2018 to 2023, and who played for the Maple Leafs during the 1991–92 season, was named head coach on May 17.
Utah Hockey Club	Expansion team; hockey assets transferred from Arizona Coyotes	Andre Tourigny	Alongside the other hockey assets of the Arizona Coyotes, Tourigny's contract was transferred to the new Utah Hockey Club, who retained him as head coach.
Winnipeg Jets	Rick Bowness	Scott Arniel	Bowness announced his retirement from coaching on May 6, 2024. In two seasons with Winnipeg, Bowness compiled a 98–57–9 record, with two playoff appearances. Arniel, an associate coach, and formerly head coach of the Columbus Blue Jackets from 2010 to 2012, was promoted to head coach on May 24.
In-season
Team	Outgoing coach	Incoming coach	Notes
Boston Bruins	Jim Montgomery	Joe Sacco*	Montgomery was fired on November 19, 2024, after the Bruins started the season 8–9–3. In just over two seasons with the Bruins, Montgomery totaled a 120–41–23 record with two playoff appearances, including a Presidents' Trophy in 2023 following one of the greatest regular seasons in NHL history. Sacco, a Bruins assistant coach, and formerly head coach of the Colorado Avalanche from 2009 to 2013, was named interim head coach the same day.
Chicago Blackhawks	Luke Richardson	Anders Sorensen*	Richardson was fired on December 5, 2024, after the Blackhawks began the season 8–16–2. In just over two seasons with Chicago, Richardson totaled a 57–118–15 record, failing to reach the playoffs in either completed year. Sorensen, previously the head coach of the Blackhawks' AHL affiliate, the Rockford IceHogs, was named interim head coach the same day. Sorensen became the first Swedish-born head coach in NHL history.
Detroit Red Wings	Derek Lalonde	Todd McLellan	Lalonde was fired on December 26, 2024, after the Red Wings started the season 13–17–4. In just over two seasons with Detroit, Lalonde posted an 89–86–23 record, with no playoff appearances. McLellan, most recently head coach of the Los Angeles Kings from 2019 to 2024, and previously an assistant coach with Detroit, was named head coach the same day.
Philadelphia Flyers	John Tortorella	Brad Shaw*	Tortorella was fired on March 27, 2025, with the Flyers holding a 28–36–9 record, and after a 1–10–1 record in their 12 games prior to Tortorella's dismissal. In just under three seasons with Philadelphia, Tortorella posted a 97–107–33 record, with no playoff appearances. Shaw, previously an assistant coach, was named interim head coach the same day.
St. Louis Blues	Drew Bannister	Jim Montgomery	Bannister was fired on November 24, 2024, after the Blues started the season 9–12–1. In parts of two seasons with the Blues, Bannister totaled a 39–31–6 record, missing the playoffs in his only completed year. Montgomery, most recently head coach of the Boston Bruins from 2022 until his firing five days prior, and formerly a player and assistant coach with the Blues, was named head coach the same day.

(*) Indicates interim

== Front office changes ==
General managers
Off-season
Team	2023–24 general manager	2024–25 general manager	Notes
Carolina Hurricanes	Don Waddell	Eric Tulsky	Waddell announced his resignation on May 24, 2024, eight days after Carolina's elimination from the playoffs. Having joined the Hurricanes' organization in 2014 and serving as general manager since 2018, Waddell oversaw six consecutive playoff appearances, three division championships, and two trips to the Eastern Conference finals. Tulsky, the assistant GM, was named interim general manager, before being promoted to full-time general manager on June 18, 2024.
Columbus Blue Jackets	Jarmo Kekäläinen; John Davidson*	Don Waddell	Kekäläinen was fired on February 15, 2024, after the Blue Jackets began the season 16–26–10. Kekäläinen had served as general manager of the Blue Jackets since 2013, overseeing five playoff appearances, including the franchise's first playoff series win in 2019. Davidson, the president of hockey operations, was named interim general manager. Waddell, most recently general manager of the Carolina Hurricanes from 2018 to 2024, and who had resigned from the Hurricanes four days prior, was named general manager on May 28, 2024, also assuming the roles of president of hockey operations and alternate governor.
Edmonton Oilers	Ken Holland	Jeff Jackson*; Stan Bowman	On June 27, 2024, three days after the Oilers' loss in the 2024 Stanley Cup Final, and with his contract expiring, the team and Holland mutually agreed to part ways. Holland had served as general manager since 2019, with the Oilers qualifying for the playoffs every season of his term, including two trips to the Western Conference finals and the aforementioned Stanley Cup Final appearance. Jackson, the CEO of hockey operations, assumed the role of interim general manager. Bowman, most recently general manager of the Chicago Blackhawks from 2009 to 2021, and who had been reinstated from a suspension relating to the Blackhawks' sexual assault scandal three weeks prior, was named general manager on July 24, 2024.
Utah Hockey Club	Expansion team; hockey assets transferred from Arizona Coyotes	Bill Armstrong	Alongside the other hockey assets of the Arizona Coyotes, Armstrong's contract was transferred to the new Utah Hockey Club, who retained him as general manager.
Washington Capitals	Brian MacLellan	Chris Patrick	Patrick was promoted to general manager on July 8, 2024. MacLellan remained president of hockey operations, having held the role since 2023.

(*) Indicates interim

== Arena changes ==
- The Carolina Hurricanes' home arena, PNC Arena, was renamed Lenovo Center on September 12, 2024, as part of a naming rights agreement with Lenovo.
- The Utah Hockey Club began playing home games at the NBA's Utah Jazz's home arena, Delta Center. Renovations were required to make it the team's permanent home, similar to the renovations made to Climate Pledge Arena before the Seattle Kraken began play in the NHL.

== Regular season ==
The regular season ran from October 4, 2024, to April 17, 2025.

=== International games ===
The Buffalo Sabres and New Jersey Devils played their first two regular season games against each other on October 4 and 5, 2024, at O2 Arena in Prague, Czech Republic. The Dallas Stars and Florida Panthers played two games on November 1 and 2, at Nokia Arena in Tampere, Finland.

=== Outdoor games ===
The league scheduled the following outdoor games:

- The 2025 Winter Classic was held on December 31, 2024, at Wrigley Field in Chicago, with the Chicago Blackhawks hosting the St. Louis Blues.
- The 2025 Stadium Series was held on March 1, 2025, at Ohio Stadium on the campus of the Ohio State University in Columbus, Ohio, with the Columbus Blue Jackets hosting the Detroit Red Wings.

=== 4 Nations Face-Off ===
Instead of the All-Star Game, the league held a new 4 Nations Face-Off tournament as a preview for the NHL's return to Olympic participation in 2026. Four teams representing NHL players from Canada, Finland, Sweden, and the United States played a total of seven games from February 12 to 20. Games were held at Boston's TD Garden and Montreal's Bell Centre.

=== Postponed games ===
- The Tampa Bay Lightning home opener against the Carolina Hurricanes, scheduled for October 12, 2024, was postponed to January 7, 2025, due to the effects of Hurricane Milton, which struck the Tampa Bay region three days prior.
- The Los Angeles Kings home game against the Calgary Flames scheduled for January 8, 2025, was postponed to April 17, 2025, due to wildfires in the Los Angeles area.

== Standings ==
=== Eastern Conference ===
Top 3 (Metropolitan Division)
Pos	Team	GP	W	L	OTL	RW	GF	GA	GD	Pts
1	z – Washington Capitals	82	51	22	9	43	288	232	+56	111
2	x – Carolina Hurricanes	82	47	30	5	42	266	233	+33	99
3	x – New Jersey Devils	82	42	33	7	36	242	222	+20	91

Source: National Hockey League
Rules for classification: 1) Fewer number of games played (GP, only during regular season); 2) Greater number of regulation wins (RW); 3) Greater number of wins in regulation and overtime, excluding shootout wins (ROW); 4) Greater number of total wins, including shootouts (W); 5) Greater number of points earned in head-to-head play; if teams played an uneven number of head-to-head games, the result of the first game on the home ice of the team with the extra home game is discarded; 6) Greater goal differential (GD); 7) Greater number of goals scored (GF)
x – Clinched playoff spot; z – Clinched conference

Top 3 (Atlantic Division)
Pos	Team	GP	W	L	OTL	RW	GF	GA	GD	Pts
1	y – Toronto Maple Leafs	82	52	26	4	41	268	231	+37	108
2	x – Tampa Bay Lightning	82	47	27	8	41	294	219	+75	102
3	x – Florida Panthers	82	47	31	4	37	252	223	+29	98

Source: National Hockey League
Rules for classification: 1) Fewer number of games played (GP, only during regular season); 2) Greater number of regulation wins (RW); 3) Greater number of wins in regulation and overtime, excluding shootout wins (ROW); 4) Greater number of total wins, including shootouts (W); 5) Greater number of points earned in head-to-head play; if teams played an uneven number of head-to-head games, the result of the first game on the home ice of the team with the extra home game is discarded; 6) Greater goal differential (GD); 7) Greater number of goals scored (GF)
x – Clinched playoff spot; y – Clinched division

Eastern Conference Wild Card
Pos	Div	Team	GP	W	L	OTL	RW	GF	GA	GD	Pts
1	AT	x – Ottawa Senators	82	45	30	7	35	243	234	+9	97
2	AT	x – Montreal Canadiens	82	40	31	11	30	245	265	−20	91
3	ME	Columbus Blue Jackets	82	40	33	9	30	273	268	+5	89
4	AT	Detroit Red Wings	82	39	35	8	30	238	259	−21	86
5	ME	New York Rangers	82	39	36	7	35	256	255	+1	85
6	ME	New York Islanders	82	35	35	12	28	224	260	−36	82
7	ME	Pittsburgh Penguins	82	34	36	12	24	243	293	−50	80
8	AT	Buffalo Sabres	82	36	39	7	29	269	289	−20	79
9	AT	Boston Bruins	82	33	39	10	26	222	272	−50	76
10	ME	Philadelphia Flyers	82	33	39	10	21	238	286	−48	76

Source: National Hockey League
Rules for classification: 1) Fewer number of games played (GP, only during regular season); 2) Greater number of regulation wins (RW); 3) Greater number of wins in regulation and overtime, excluding shootout wins (ROW); 4) Greater number of total wins, including shootouts (W); 5) Greater number of points earned in head-to-head play; if teams played an uneven number of head-to-head games, the result of the first game on the home ice of the team with the extra home game is discarded; 6) Greater goal differential (GD); 7) Greater number of goals scored (GF)
x – Clinched playoff spot

=== Western Conference ===
Top 3 (Central Division)
Pos	Team	GP	W	L	OTL	RW	GF	GA	GD	Pts
1	p – Winnipeg Jets	82	56	22	4	43	277	191	+86	116
2	x – Dallas Stars	82	50	26	6	41	277	224	+53	106
3	x – Colorado Avalanche	82	49	29	4	40	277	234	+43	102

Source: National Hockey League
Rules for classification: 1) Fewer number of games played (GP, only during regular season); 2) Greater number of regulation wins (RW); 3) Greater number of wins in regulation and overtime, excluding shootout wins (ROW); 4) Greater number of total wins, including shootouts (W); 5) Greater number of points earned in head-to-head play; if teams played an uneven number of head-to-head games, the result of the first game on the home ice of the team with the extra home game is discarded; 6) Greater goal differential (GD); 7) Greater number of goals scored (GF)
p – Clinched Presidents' Trophy; x – Clinched playoff spot

Top 3 (Pacific Division)
Pos	Team	GP	W	L	OTL	RW	GF	GA	GD	Pts
1	y – Vegas Golden Knights	82	50	22	10	46	275	219	+56	110
2	x – Los Angeles Kings	82	48	25	9	43	250	206	+44	105
3	x – Edmonton Oilers	82	48	29	5	36	259	236	+23	101

Source: National Hockey League
Rules for classification: 1) Fewer number of games played (GP, only during regular season); 2) Greater number of regulation wins (RW); 3) Greater number of wins in regulation and overtime, excluding shootout wins (ROW); 4) Greater number of total wins, including shootouts (W); 5) Greater number of points earned in head-to-head play; if teams played an uneven number of head-to-head games, the result of the first game on the home ice of the team with the extra home game is discarded; 6) Greater goal differential (GD); 7) Greater number of goals scored (GF)
x – Clinched playoff spot; y – Clinched division

Western Conference Wild Card
Pos	Div	Team	GP	W	L	OTL	RW	GF	GA	GD	Pts
1	CE	x – Minnesota Wild	82	45	30	7	33	228	239	−11	97
2	CE	x – St. Louis Blues	82	44	30	8	32	254	233	+21	96
3	PA	Calgary Flames	82	41	27	14	31	225	238	−13	96
4	PA	Vancouver Canucks	82	38	30	14	28	236	253	−17	90
5	CE	Utah Hockey Club	82	38	31	13	30	241	251	−10	89
6	PA	Anaheim Ducks	82	35	37	10	24	221	263	−42	80
7	PA	Seattle Kraken	82	35	41	6	28	247	265	−18	76
8	CE	Nashville Predators	82	30	44	8	24	214	274	−60	68
9	CE	Chicago Blackhawks	82	25	46	11	20	226	296	−70	61
10	PA	San Jose Sharks	82	20	50	12	14	210	315	−105	52

Source: National Hockey League
Rules for classification: 1) Fewer number of games played (GP, only during regular season); 2) Greater number of regulation wins (RW); 3) Greater number of wins in regulation and overtime, excluding shootout wins (ROW); 4) Greater number of total wins, including shootouts (W); 5) Greater number of points earned in head-to-head play; if teams played an uneven number of head-to-head games, the result of the first game on the home ice of the team with the extra home game is discarded; 6) Greater goal differential (GD); 7) Greater number of goals scored (GF)
x – Clinched playoff spot

== Playoffs ==
=== Bracket ===
In each round, teams compete in a best-of-seven series following a 2–2–1–1–1 format (scores in the bracket indicate the number of games won in each best-of-seven series). The team with home ice advantage plays at home for games one and two (and games five and seven, if necessary), and the other team is at home for games three and four (and game six, if necessary). The top three teams in each division make the playoffs, along with two wild cards in each conference, for a total of eight teams from each conference.

In the first round, the lower seeded wild card in each conference was played against the division winner with the best record while the other wild card was played against the other division winner, and both wild cards were de facto #4 seeds. The other series matched the second and third-place teams from the divisions. In the first two rounds, home ice advantage was awarded to the team with the better seed. In the conference finals and Stanley Cup Final, home ice advantage was awarded to the team with the better regular season record.

First round	Second round
A1	Toronto	4
WC1	Ottawa	2
A1	Toronto	3
A3	Florida	4
A2	Tampa Bay	1
A3	Florida	4
Eastern Conference
M1	Washington	4
WC2	Montreal	1
M1	Washington	1
M2	Carolina	4
M2	Carolina	4
M3	New Jersey	1
C1	Winnipeg	4
WC2	St. Louis	3
C1	Winnipeg	2
C2	Dallas	4
C2	Dallas	4
C3	Colorado	3
Western Conference
P1	Vegas	4
WC1	Minnesota	2
P1	Vegas	1
P3	Edmonton	4
P2	Los Angeles	2
P3	Edmonton	4

Conference finals
A3	Florida	4
M2	Carolina	1
C2	Dallas	1
P3	Edmonton	4

Stanley Cup Final
A3	Florida	4
P3	Edmonton	2

== Statistics ==
=== Scoring leaders ===
The following players led the league in regular season points at the completion of games played on April 17, 2025.

Player	Team	GP	G	A	Pts	+/–	PIM
Nikita Kucherov	Tampa Bay Lightning	78	37	84	121	+22	45
Nathan MacKinnon	Colorado Avalanche	79	32	84	116	+25	41
Leon Draisaitl	Edmonton Oilers	71	52	54	106	+32	34
David Pastrnak	Boston Bruins	82	43	63	106	0	42
Mitch Marner	Toronto Maple Leafs	81	27	75	102	+18	14
Connor McDavid	Edmonton Oilers	67	26	74	100	+20	37
Kyle Connor	Winnipeg Jets	82	41	56	97	+17	25
Jack Eichel	Vegas Golden Knights	77	28	66	94	+32	8
Cale Makar	Colorado Avalanche	80	30	62	92	+28	14
Sidney Crosby	Pittsburgh Penguins	80	33	58	91	–20	31

=== Leading goaltenders ===
The following goaltenders led the league in regular season goals against average at the completion of games played on April 17, 2025, while playing at least 1,800 minutes.

Player	Team	GP	TOI	W	L	OTL	GA	SO	SV%	GAA
Connor Hellebuyck	Winnipeg Jets	63	3,741:22	47	12	3	125	8	.925	2.00
Darcy Kuemper	Los Angeles Kings	50	2,973:39	31	11	7	100	5	.922	2.02
Anthony Stolarz	Toronto Maple Leafs	34	1,986:54	21	8	3	71	4	.926	2.14
Andrei Vasilevskiy	Tampa Bay Lightning	63	3,743:05	38	20	5	136	6	.921	2.18
Sergei Bobrovsky	Florida Panthers	54	3,199:59	33	19	2	130	5	.906	2.44
Adin Hill	Vegas Golden Knights	50	2,940:13	32	13	5	121	4	.906	2.47
Logan Thompson	Washington Capitals	43	2,535:09	31	6	6	105	2	.910	2.49
Jacob Markstrom	New Jersey Devils	49	2,903:01	26	16	6	121	4	.900	2.50
Mackenzie Blackwood	San Jose/Colorado	56	3,223:38	28	21	6	137	4	.912	2.55
Filip Gustavsson	Minnesota Wild	58	3,423:35	31	19	6	146	5	.914	2.56

== NHL awards ==
Voting concluded immediately after the end of the regular season. Statistics-based awards such as the Art Ross Trophy, Maurice "Rocket" Richard Trophy, William M. Jennings Trophy and the Presidents' Trophy are announced at the end of the regular season. The Stanley Cup and the Conn Smythe Trophy are presented at the end of the Stanley Cup Final.

The Hart Memorial Trophy and Vezina Trophy were announced in an hour-long NHL Awards special on June 12, airing on TNT (U.S.) and Sportsnet (Canada) before game 4 of the Stanley Cup Final. The other awards were announced in the days leading up to the special. The Jim Gregory General Manager of the Year Award is presented prior to the NHL entry draft.

2024–25 NHL awards
Award	Recipient(s)	Runner(s)-up/Finalists	Ref
Presidents' Trophy (best regular-season record)	Winnipeg Jets	Washington Capitals	
Prince of Wales Trophy (Eastern Conference playoff champion)	Florida Panthers	Carolina Hurricanes	
Clarence S. Campbell Bowl (Western Conference playoff champion)	Edmonton Oilers	Dallas Stars	
Art Ross Trophy (player with most points)	Nikita Kucherov (Tampa Bay Lightning)	Nathan MacKinnon (Colorado Avalanche)	
Bill Masterton Memorial Trophy (perseverance, sportsmanship, and dedication)	Sean Monahan (Columbus Blue Jackets)	Marc-Andre Fleury (Minnesota Wild); Gabriel Landeskog (Colorado Avalanche)	
Calder Memorial Trophy (best first-year player)	Lane Hutson (Montreal Canadiens)	Macklin Celebrini (San Jose Sharks); Dustin Wolf (Calgary Flames)	
Conn Smythe Trophy (most valuable player, playoffs)	Sam Bennett (Florida Panthers)	Brad Marchand (Florida Panthers)	
Frank J. Selke Trophy (best defensive forward)	Aleksander Barkov (Florida Panthers)	Anthony Cirelli (Tampa Bay Lightning); Sam Reinhart (Florida Panthers)	
Hart Memorial Trophy (most valuable player, regular season)	Connor Hellebuyck (Winnipeg Jets)	Leon Draisaitl (Edmonton Oilers); Nikita Kucherov (Tampa Bay Lightning)	
Jack Adams Award (best coach)	Spencer Carbery (Washington Capitals)	Scott Arniel (Winnipeg Jets); Martin St. Louis (Montreal Canadiens)	
James Norris Memorial Trophy (best defenseman)	Cale Makar (Colorado Avalanche)	Quinn Hughes (Vancouver Canucks); Zach Werenski (Columbus Blue Jackets)	
King Clancy Memorial Trophy (leadership and humanitarian contribution)	Aleksander Barkov (Florida Panthers)	N/A	
Lady Byng Memorial Trophy (sportsmanship and excellence)	Anze Kopitar (Los Angeles Kings)	Jack Eichel (Vegas Golden Knights); Brayden Point (Tampa Bay Lightning)	
Ted Lindsay Award (outstanding player)	Nikita Kucherov (Tampa Bay Lightning)	Nathan MacKinnon (Colorado Avalanche); Cale Makar (Colorado Avalanche)	
Mark Messier Leadership Award (leadership and community activities)	Alexander Ovechkin (Washington Capitals)	N/A	
Maurice "Rocket" Richard Trophy (top goal-scorer)	Leon Draisaitl (Edmonton Oilers)	William Nylander (Toronto Maple Leafs)	
Jim Gregory General Manager of the Year Award (top general manager)	Jim Nill (Dallas Stars)	Kevin Cheveldayoff (Winnipeg Jets); Bill Zito (Florida Panthers)	
Vezina Trophy (best goaltender)	Connor Hellebuyck (Winnipeg Jets)	Darcy Kuemper (Los Angeles Kings); Andrei Vasilevskiy (Tampa Bay Lightning)	
William M. Jennings Trophy (goaltender(s) of team with fewest goals against)	Connor Hellebuyck (Winnipeg Jets)	Darcy Kuemper and David Rittich (Los Angeles Kings)	

=== All-Star teams ===
Position	First Team	Second Team	Position	All-Rookie
G	Connor Hellebuyck, Winnipeg Jets	Andrei Vasilevskiy, Tampa Bay Lightning	G	Dustin Wolf, Calgary Flames
D	Cale Makar, Colorado Avalanche	Victor Hedman, Tampa Bay Lightning	D	Lane Hutson, Montreal Canadiens
D	Zach Werenski, Columbus Blue Jackets	Quinn Hughes, Vancouver Canucks	D	Denton Mateychuk, Columbus Blue Jackets
C	Nathan MacKinnon, Colorado Avalanche	Leon Draisaitl, Edmonton Oilers	F	Macklin Celebrini, San Jose Sharks
RW	Nikita Kucherov, Tampa Bay Lightning	David Pastrnak, Boston Bruins	F	Cutter Gauthier, Anaheim Ducks
LW	Kyle Connor, Winnipeg Jets	Brandon Hagel, Tampa Bay Lightning	F	Matvei Michkov, Philadelphia Flyers

== Uniforms ==
This is the first season for Fanatics as the official apparel provider of the NHL under a ten-year contract, replacing Adidas, which was the official apparel provider on a seven-year contract since the 2017–18 season.

=== Wholesale team changes ===
- The Anaheim Ducks unveiled a new logo and uniforms, introducing a modernized version of their Mighty Ducks-era primary logo previously utilized from 1993 to 2006, but re-colored in their current orange, black, and gold color scheme. Their new uniforms feature an orange base, with matching helmets and pants.
- The Boston Bruins wore a special commemorative uniform, inspired by their 1974–1995 uniforms, for their centennial game against the Montreal Canadiens on December 1, the 100th anniversary of their first-ever game.
- The Los Angeles Kings unveiled a new logo, consisting of a modernized version of their logo utilized from 1988 to 1998, with the crown from their original 1967 logo. The Kings also revealed new jerseys, similarly based on their 1988–98 set, and featuring a new matte black helmet.
- The Utah Hockey Club revealed their temporary logo, colors, and uniforms for their inaugural season. The logo depicts a roundel with a "Utah" wordmark in the center, ringed with "Hockey Club" and colored with mountain blue, rock black, and salt white. The home uniforms consisted of a black base with a diagonal "UTAH" wordmark across the front, with blue and white striping, with the road uniforms utilizing a white base with black and blue striping.
- The Washington Capitals re-introduced their black "Screaming Eagle" 2022–23 Reverse Retro uniforms as their new alternate uniforms.

=== Outdoor game uniforms ===
- The Chicago Blackhawks and St. Louis Blues introduced uniforms for the Winter Classic. The Blackhawks' uniforms include elements of their own history, the flag of Chicago, and Wrigley Field, while the Blues' uniforms invoke St. Louis' ice hockey heritage, and utilize elements from an unworn prototype jersey that previously inspired their 2022–23 Reverse Retro uniforms.
- The Columbus Blue Jackets and Detroit Red Wings unveiled uniforms for the Stadium Series. The Blue Jackets' uniforms are inspired by the uniforms of the Union Army and their home state of Ohio, with a new cannon crest, while Detroit's pay tribute to the city's automotive industry, and feature a script "Detroit" logo with a winged helmet design.

== Milestones ==
=== First games ===
The following is a list of notable players who played their first NHL game during the 2024–25 season, listed with their first team.

Player	Team	Notability
Macklin Celebrini	San Jose Sharks	First overall pick in the 2024 draft

=== Last games ===
The following is a list of players of note who played their last NHL game in 2024–25, listed with their team:

Player	Team	Notability
Cam Atkinson	Tampa Bay Lightning	Two-time NHL All-Star
Marc-Andre Fleury	Minnesota Wild	Over 1,000 games played, first overall pick in the 2003 draft, Vezina Trophy winner, William M. Jennings Trophy winner, one-time NHL All-Star team selection, 2010s All-Decade Team selection, five-time NHL All-Star, second among goaltenders in games played (1,051) and wins (575)
Erik Johnson	Colorado Avalanche	Over 1,000 games played, first overall pick in the 2006 draft, one-time NHL All-Star
Jack Johnson	Columbus Blue Jackets	Over 1,200 games played
Trevor Lewis	Los Angeles Kings	Over 1,000 games played
Max Pacioretty	Toronto Maple Leafs	Bill Masterton Memorial Trophy winner, one-time NHL All-Star

=== Major milestones reached ===
- On October 8, 2024, the Seattle Kraken named Jordan Eberle their new captain, marking the first season since 2010–11 in which every NHL franchise has a captain. This would last until New York Rangers captain Jacob Trouba was traded to the Anaheim Ducks on December 6, 2024.
- On October 9, 2024, Winnipeg Jets forward Kyle Connor scored a goal in Winnipeg's first game for the seventh consecutive year, setting a new NHL record for consecutive season-openers with a goal.
- On October 14, 2024, New Jersey Devils goaltender Jake Allen recorded a 3–0 win over the Utah Hockey Club, becoming the first goaltender in NHL history to record a win over 33 different franchises.
- On October 15, 2024, Minnesota Wild goaltender Filip Gustavsson became the 15th goaltender in NHL history to score a goal in an NHL game. (Note: Gustavsson and Nedeljkovic scored their goals directly, with a shot on goal; conversely, Sorokin was credited with a goal after being the last Islanders player to touch the puck prior to an own goal.)
- On October 16, 2024, Pittsburgh Penguins forward Sidney Crosby recorded his 1,600th point, becoming the 10th player to reach the mark.
- On October 16, 2024, Pittsburgh Penguins forward Evgeni Malkin scored his 500th goal, becoming the 48th player to reach the mark.
- On October 17, 2024, Nashville Predators defenseman Luke Schenn played his 1,000th NHL game, becoming the 399th player to reach the mark.
- On October 19, 2024, Vancouver Canucks defenseman Tyler Myers played his 1,000th NHL game, becoming the 400th player to reach the mark.
- On October 24, 2024, Florida Panthers goaltender Sergei Bobrovsky recorded his 400th win, becoming the 14th goaltender to reach the mark. Bobrovsky also became the fastest goaltender to reach 400 wins in NHL history, doing so in his 707th NHL game.
- On November 1, 2024, Calgary Flames forward Mikael Backlund played his 1,000th NHL game, becoming the 401st player to reach the mark.
- On November 3, 2024, Winnipeg Jets forward Nikolaj Ehlers recorded his 474th point, setting a new all-time record for points among Danish players, and surpassing the record previously held by Frans Nielsen.
- On November 7, 2024, the Winnipeg Jets recorded their 13th win in their 14th game, becoming the second team in NHL history to win 13 of their first 14 games (alongside the 2007–08 Ottawa Senators). Two days later on November 9, the Jets recorded their 14th win in their 15th game, setting the NHL record for best start to a season.
- On November 13, 2024, Toronto Maple Leafs defenseman Oliver Ekman-Larsson played his 1,000th NHL game, becoming the 402nd player to reach the mark.
- On November 14, 2024, Tampa Bay Lightning goaltender Andrei Vasilevskiy recorded his 300th win, becoming the 40th goaltender to reach the mark. Vasilevskiy also became the fastest goaltender to reach 300 wins in NHL history, doing so in his 490th NHL game, and surpassing the record previously held by Jacques Plante.
- On November 14, 2024, Edmonton Oilers forward Connor McDavid recorded his 1,000th point, becoming the 99th player to reach the mark. McDavid also became the fourth-fastest to accomplish the milestone, doing so in 659 games.
- On November 16, 2024, Philadelphia Flyers defenseman Erik Johnson played his 1,000th NHL game, becoming the 403rd player to reach the mark.
- On November 21, 2024, New Jersey Devils goaltender Jacob Markstrom played his 500th game, becoming the 81st goaltender to reach the mark.
- On November 23, 2024, Pittsburgh Penguins forward Sidney Crosby scored his 600th goal, becoming the 21st player to reach the mark.
- On November 29, 2024, Detroit Red Wings goaltender Cam Talbot played his 500th game, becoming the 82nd goaltender to reach the mark.
- On December 1, 2024, Vancouver Canucks goaltender Kevin Lankinen recorded a 5–4 win over the Detroit Red Wings in overtime, becoming the first goaltender in NHL history to win 10 consecutive road games to begin a season.
- On December 12, 2024, Tampa Bay Lightning goaltender Andrei Vasilevskiy played his 500th game, becoming the 83rd goaltender to reach the mark.
- On December 17, 2024, Kevin He signed a three-year, entry-level contract with the Winnipeg Jets, becoming the first Chinese-born player to sign an NHL contract.
- On December 28, 2024, Carolina Hurricanes head coach Rod Brind'Amour recorded his 300th win in his 488th game coached, becoming the fastest coach in NHL history to 300 wins, and surpassing the record previously held by Bruce Boudreau.
- On December 31, 2024, St. Louis Blues defenseman Cam Fowler played his 1,000th NHL game, becoming the 404th player to reach the mark. Fowler also became the first player in NHL history to play his 1,000th game in an outdoor game, doing so in the 2025 Winter Classic.
- On January 4, 2025, Los Angeles Kings forward Trevor Lewis played his 1,000th NHL game, becoming the 405th player to reach the mark.
- On January 7, 2025, Winnipeg Jets goaltender Connor Hellebuyck recorded his 300th win, becoming the 41st goaltender to reach the mark.
- On January 16, 2025, Washington Capitals forward Alexander Ovechkin scored a goal against Ottawa Senators goaltender Leevi Merilainen, setting a new record for total goaltenders scored against with 179, and surpassing the record previously held by Jaromir Jagr.
- On January 17, 2025, Pittsburgh Penguins goaltender Alex Nedeljkovic became the 16th goaltender in NHL history to score a goal in an NHL game. Nedeljkovic also became the first goaltender in NHL history to score a goal and record an assist in the same game, as well as the first goaltender to score goals in the NHL, American Hockey League (AHL), and ECHL.
- On January 18, 2025, St. Louis Blues defenseman Ryan Suter played his 500th consecutive NHL game, becoming the 26th player to reach the mark.
- On January 19, 2025, Montreal Canadiens goaltender Jakub Dobes recorded his fifth consecutive win in his fifth game played, becoming the 13th goaltender in NHL history to begin a career with five consecutive wins.
- On January 20, 2025, Carolina Hurricanes goaltender Frederik Andersen played his 500th game, becoming the 84th goaltender to reach the mark.
- On January 23, 2025, Carolina Hurricanes goaltender Frederik Andersen recorded his 300th win, becoming the 42nd goaltender to reach the mark.
- On January 29, 2025, Florida Panthers defenseman Dmitry Kulikov played his 1,000th NHL game, becoming the 406th player to reach the mark.
- On February 1, 2025, Florida Panthers head coach Paul Maurice recorded his 900th win, becoming the fourth coach to reach the mark.
- On February 2, 2025, New York Rangers goaltender Jonathan Quick recorded his 400th win, becoming the 15th overall and first American-born goaltender to reach the mark.
- On February 4, 2025, Anaheim Ducks goaltender John Gibson played his 500th game, becoming the 85th goaltender to reach the mark.
- On February 8, 2025, St. Louis Blues defenseman Ryan Suter played his 1,500th NHL game, becoming the 22nd player to reach the mark.
- On February 22, 2025, Carolina Hurricanes defenseman Brent Burns played his 900th consecutive NHL game, becoming the sixth player to reach the mark.
- On February 27, 2025, St. Louis Blues forward Brayden Schenn played his 1,000th NHL game, becoming the 407th player to reach the mark. Additionally, Schenn joined his brother Luke as the first pair of brothers to each record their 1,000th game played in the same season, with Luke having achieved the milestone four months prior.
- On March 1, 2025, New York Islanders goaltender Ilya Sorokin became the 17th goaltender in NHL history to be credited with a goal in an NHL game.
- On March 4, 2025, San Jose Sharks defenseman Marc-Edouard Vlasic blocked his 2,165th shot, becoming the all-time leader in blocked shots since the statistic began to be tracked, and surpassing the record previously held by Mark Giordano.
- On March 9, 2025, Washington Capitals forward Alexander Ovechkin recorded his 1,600th point, becoming the 11th player to reach the mark.
- On March 10, 2025, Colorado Avalanche forward Nathan MacKinnon recorded his 1,000th point, becoming the 100th player to reach the mark.
- On March 12, 2025, Seattle Kraken defenseman Brandon Montour scored a game-winning overtime goal only four seconds into the overtime period, setting a new record for the fastest overtime goal in NHL history, and tying the record for fastest period-opening goal.
- On March 18, 2025, Washington Capitals forward Aliaksei Protas recorded his 60th point of the season, setting a new single-season record for points among Belarusian players, and surpassing the record previously held by Yegor Sharangovich.
- On March 22, 2025, Vancouver Canucks forward Kiefer Sherwood recorded his 384th hit of the season, setting a new single-season record for hits, and surpassing the record previously held by Jeremy Lauzon.
- On March 25, 2025, Buffalo Sabres head coach Lindy Ruff won his 600th game as head coach of the Sabres, becoming the second coach to win 600 games with one franchise.
- On March 27, 2025, Pittsburgh Penguins forward Sidney Crosby recorded his 80th point of the season, securing his 20th season averaging at least one point per game, setting a new record for point-per-game seasons, and surpassing the record previously held by Wayne Gretzky.
- On March 27, 2025, Tampa Bay Lightning defenseman Ryan McDonagh played his 1,000th NHL game, becoming the 408th player to reach the mark.
- On April 4, 2025, Washington Capitals forward Alexander Ovechkin scored his 894th goal, tying the all-time record for goals held by Wayne Gretzky. Ovechkin also recorded his 136th game-winning goal, setting a new record for game-winning goals, and surpassing the record previously held by Jaromir Jagr.
- On April 6, 2025, Washington Capitals forward Alexander Ovechkin scored his 895th goal, setting a new record for goals, and surpassing the record previously held by Wayne Gretzky.
- On April 17, 2025, Buffalo Sabres head coach Lindy Ruff won his 900th game as an NHL head coach, becoming the fifth head coach in NHL history to reach the mark.
- On April 29, 2025, Minnesota Wild goaltender Marc-Andre Fleury entered game 5 of the Wild's first-round playoff series, marking the 18th playoff season of his career, setting a new record among goaltenders for playoff seasons, and surpassing the record previously jointly held by Martin Brodeur, Patrick Roy, and himself.
- On May 29, 2025, the Edmonton Oilers won the Western Conference finals series, making head coach Kris Knoblauch the sixth coach in NHL history to reach the Stanley Cup Final in each of their first two seasons as head coach.
- On June 12, 2025, Edmonton Oilers forward Leon Draisaitl scored his fourth overtime goal of the 2025 Stanley Cup playoffs to win game 4 of the 2025 Stanley Cup Final, setting a new record for overtime goals in a single playoff season, and surpassing the record previously held in a five-way tie.
- On June 17, 2025, Florida Panthers forward Sam Reinhart scored four goals in game 6 of the 2025 Stanley Cup Final, becoming the first player to score four goals in a Cup Final game since Maurice Richard in 1957. Reinhart also became the first player to score four goals in a Stanley Cup-clinching game since Babe Dye in 1922, over 100 years before.

== Media rights ==
=== National ===
==== Canada ====
This was the 11th season of the 12-year Canadian national broadcast rights deal with Sportsnet. This included Sportsnet's sub-licensing agreements to air Saturday Hockey Night in Canada (HNIC) games on CBC Television and French-language broadcasts on TVA Sports. On April 2, 2025, Sportsnet agreed to a new deal to keep the Canadian national rights through the 2037–38 season.

Amazon Prime Video signed a two-year sub-licensing agreement for Monday Night Hockey, replacing Rogers Monday Night Hockey on Sportsnet with the re-branded Prime Monday Night Hockey. Prime Video also aired a weekly whiparound studio show, NHL Coast To Coast, on Thursday nights.

Sportsnet continued to air Wednesday Night Hockey, the Winter Classic, and the Stadium Series, as well as the 4 Nations Face-Off tournament, and this season's Hockey Day in Canada games on January 18. Saturday HNIC games aired on CBC, one or more of the four Sportsnet feeds, Sportsnet One, Sportsnet 360, or Citytv; decisions on network assignments were made on a week-by-week basis, and select games may simulcast on multiple networks. Sportsnet+ streamed games depending on the tier, with national games available on the Standard level, out-of-market games on the Premium tier, and via authenticated streaming on participating teams.

TVA Sports' schedule included Saturday La super soirée LNH (lit. 'NHL Super Evening') games, as well as French-language broadcasts of the Winter Classic, Stadium Series, among others.

==== United States ====
This was the fourth season of the league's seven-year U.S. national broadcast rights deals with the ESPN family of networks and TNT Sports.

ESPN broadcast select Tuesday-night games throughout the regular season, including an opening day tripleheader on October 8. ESPN2 aired a doubleheader on Friday, December 27, then ESPN televised select Thursday–Sunday night games from December 29 to the last regular season night on April 17. ABC's schedule included Hockey Saturday on 11 Saturdays between January and April, and a Sunday game on January 5. ESPN+ and Hulu then exclusive streamed games on select days throughout the season, with most of them on Tuesdays and Thursdays. ESPN+ also streamed all of ABC's games, selected ESPN's games, and the NHL Power Play on ESPN+ out-of-market package. Unlike previous seasons, the 2025 NHL Stadium Series was on ESPN instead of ABC. The ESPN networks later flexed-in selected March and April Washington Capitals games to showcase Alexander Ovechkin's quest to break the league's career goals record; some of these games were non-exclusive broadcasts, allowing the Capitals' local broadcast to co-exist with ESPN's broadcast.

TNT had games on Wednesday nights throughout the regular season, and on select Sunday afternoons between February 23 and April 13. TNT also aired the Thanksgiving Showdown on November 29, and the Winter Classic on December 31. Some of TNT's games were also simulcast on TruTV. Not all of TNT's Wednesday and Sunday regular season games were exclusive broadcasts and were thus subject to blackout in local markets. As per the rotation, TNT aired the Stanley Cup Final this season. Max streamed all TNT Sports-produced games.

The 4 Nations Face-Off tournament was split between ESPN and TNT: TNT had the round-robin games on February 12 and 17, ABC televised the February 15 round-robin doubleheader, and ESPN aired the United States–Finland game on February 13 and the final on February 20.

=== Local ===
- Sportsnet West signed an 11-year extension to continue televising Calgary Flames and Edmonton Oilers games through the 2034–35 season.
  - Following the death of Sportsnet analyst and former NHL goaltender Greg Millen, Sportsnet declined to produce its own broadcast of a Flames road game on April 7 against the San Jose Sharks. The network instead carried a simulcast of NBC Sports California, the Sharks' home network.
- The Chicago Blackhawks, the NBA's Chicago Bulls, MLB's Chicago White Sox, and Standard Media launched the Chicago Sports Network, replacing NBC Sports Chicago as their regional broadcaster. CHSN is available as a digital multicast television network within the team's broadcast territory, with WJYS in Hammond, Indiana serving as flagship affiliate for the Chicago market.
- The Colorado Avalanche's broadcaster, Altitude Sports and Entertainment, reached an agreement with Tegna Inc. to simulcast 20 games on its Denver MyNetworkTV station KTVD, with selected games on parent NBC station KUSA.
- The Seattle Kraken's regional broadcasts moved from Root Sports Northwest to the Kraken Hockey Network, as part of a multi-year agreement between the team and Tegna. Its Seattle independent station KONG serves as flagship station, with selected games on parent NBC station KING-TV. Games also stream on Amazon Prime Video and are syndicated to broadcast stations, both within the team's broadcast territory.
- The Utah Hockey Club's regional broadcasts are produced by Smith Entertainment Group's broadcasting arm SEG Media; the team adopted a similar broadcast model to the sister Utah Jazz, with games streaming on the subscription-based UtahHC+ (as an expansion of SEG's partnership with Kiswe), and being syndicated to a network of broadcast stations. The team maintained the Coyotes' broadcasting relationship with the E. W. Scripps Company, naming KUPX in Salt Lake City—which had been televising Coyotes and Vegas Golden Knights games—as the Utah Hockey Club's flagship station. Arizona's former television territory was granted to the Golden Knights, with Scripps sister stations KASW/Phoenix and KWBA/Tucson airing a mix of Utah and Vegas games.

==== Diamond Sports Group bankruptcy ====
Diamond Sports Group, the parent company of the Bally Sports regional sports networks, has been under Chapter 11 bankruptcy protection since March 2023.

On July 2, 2024, the Florida Panthers and Bally Sports Florida mutually agreed to end their broadcast partnership. The Panthers then signed a multi-year agreement with Scripps Sports to broadcast games on three Scripps-owned stations: WSFL-TV in Miami/Fort Lauderdale, WHDT in West Palm Beach, and WFTX-DT3 in Fort Myers.

On July 5, Bally Sports terminated its contract with the Dallas Stars through bankruptcy court. The Stars subsequently announced a new digital platform known as Victory+ as part of a partnership with A Parent Media Co., to carry the team's ancillary video content, and stream regionally-televised games in-market for free. In March 2025, the Stars announced that four games would also air over-the-air on Fox Television Stations' owned KDFW or KDFI in Dallas.

On August 23, 2024, Diamond Sports announced a long-term agreement with nine of the teams to which it holds broadcast rights, committing to televise their games through at least the 2024–25 season with an approximately 20% reduction in rights fees. The agreement was set to extend to future seasons pending the approval of Diamond's bankruptcy plan by the court.

Despite being part of the announced deals, the Anaheim Ducks announced on August 27 that it would instead move to Victory+. Games were also be simulcast on Fox Television Stations' KTTV or KCOP-TV in Los Angeles.

On September 20, 2024, the St. Louis Blues announced four of its five preseason games would air on Victory+; regular season games continued to air on Bally Sports. On January 7, 2025, the Blues announced an agreement with Gray Media to exclusively air three regular season games over-the-air. All of the games were aired on Matrix Midwest, while KMOV in St. Louis, also simulcast two games. The games were streamed on Victory+.

On October 18, 2024, Diamond announced a new sponsorship agreement with FanDuel, which re-branded Bally Sports as FanDuel Sports Network on October 21. The naming rights were paid for via an annual rights fee, and advertising commitments. FanDuel also had the option to acquire a 5% equity stake in Diamond once it exits Chapter 11 bankruptcy.

Along with airing on FanDuel Sports Network, the Blue Jackets, Hurricanes, Predators and Red Wings announced agreements to simulcast a limited number of games on local over-the-air stations. The Blue Jackets simulcast five games on local stations owned by the Sinclair Broadcast Group and Gray Television. The Hurricanes simulcast two games in November on local stations owned by Capitol Broadcasting Company and Gray Television. The Predators simulcast three games on WTVF, which is owned by the E. W. Scripps Company. The Red Wings simulcast five games on WJBK, which is owned by Fox Television Stations.

On January 2, 2025, Diamond emerged from Chapter 11 bankruptcy and rebranded as Main Street Sports Group.

==== Personnel ====
- Prime Monday Night Hockey featured a new broadcast team, led by John Forslund on play-by-play, and Thomas Hickey, Shane Hnidy, and Jody Shelley on color commentary.
- The Calgary Flames hired Jon Abbott to be the new TV play-by-play announcer this season after Rick Ball left to become the Chicago Blackhawks' TV play-by-play announcer. Abbott was previously the backup TV play-by-play announcer for the Ottawa Senators.
- The Boston Bruins hired Judd Sirott to be the new TV play-by-play announcer this season following the retirement of Jack Edwards. Sirott was previously the team's radio play-by-play announcer. Ryan Johnston was then hired to replace Sirott on the radio booth.
- The Chicago Blackhawks hired Rick Ball to replace Chris Vosters as the team's TV play-by-play announcer. Ball was previously the lead TV play-by-play announcer for the Calgary Flames and occasional announcer of Sportsnet's national NHL broadcasts.
- The Columbus Blue Jackets hired Steve Mears to be the new TV play-by-play announcer this season following the retirement of Jeff Rimer. Mears was previously the play-by-play announcer for the Pittsburgh Penguins, spending six seasons on television before moving to radio last season.
- Los Angeles Kings play-by-play announcer Nick Nickson announced his impending retirement after this season. Nickson joined the Kings in the 1981–82 season, initially as the television and radio color commentator with Bob Miller, before becoming the exclusive radio play-by-play announcer by the 1990–91 season. Nickson spent the last two seasons doing play-by-play on both television and radio alongside analysts Jim Fox and Daryl Evans.
- New York Rangers TV play-by-play announcer Sam Rosen announced his impending retirement after this season. Rosen called Rangers games since the 1977–78 season, and became the full-time lead TV announcer starting with the 1984–85 season. Rosen also called national radio games of the Stanley Cup Final for NHL Radio from 1996 to 2008. On April 9, TNT assigned Rosen and long-time partner John Davidson to call the New York Rangers–Philadelphia Flyers game on the network. On May 1, Rangers TV analyst Joe Micheletti also announced his retirement. Micheletti served as Rosen's broadcast partner starting with the 2006–07 season, and also served as a TV analyst and reporter locally with the St. Louis Blues, Minnesota North Stars and New York Islanders, and nationally with Fox and NBC.
- The Ottawa Senators hired Matt Cullen to replace Jon Abbott as the team's backup TV play-by-play announcer, typically filling in during Gord Miller's national TSN assignments. Cullen has called games for the Oakville Blades of the Ontario Junior Hockey League, the Mississauga Steelheads of the Ontario Hockey League, and various events for CBC Olympic broadcasts, among others. The Senators later added Kenzie Lalonde as part of a play-by-play rotation with Miller and Cullen.
- The Pittsburgh Penguins hired Joe Brand to replace Mears as their radio play-by-play announcer. Brand was previously the Chicago Blackhawks' radio studio host and backup play-by-play announcer.
- The San Jose Sharks promoted Drew Remenda to primary TV color commentator following Bret Hedican stepping down to take a role with the San Diego Gulls. Remenda had previously been the main commentator with Randy Hahn from 2000 to 2006, and 2007 to 2014, and had been serving as a backup to Hedican since 2022. Jason Demers, Jamal Mayers and Alex Stalock joined Scott Hannan as alternate color commentators, with the four of them and Remenda cycling as the radio color commentator alongside Dan Rusanowsky.
- The Utah Hockey Club hired former Arizona Coyotes play-by-play announcer Matt McConnell for the same position, with former ESPN analyst Dominic Moore and Seattle Kraken color analyst Nick Olczyk hired as TV analysts.

== See also ==
- 2024–25 NHL transactions
- 2024–25 NHL suspensions and fines
- List of 2024–25 NHL Three Star Awards
- 2024 in sports
- 2025 in sports
- 2025 in ice hockey
