= History of the Anaheim Ducks =

History of the Hockey team Anaheim Ducks

Alternate logo used by the Mighty Ducks from 2004 to 2006.

The history of the Anaheim Ducks begins when the team joined the National Hockey League (NHL) in 1993 as the Mighty Ducks of Anaheim. Founded as an expansion team in 1993 along with the Florida Panthers, the Ducks were originally owned by The Walt Disney Company, which named the franchise after its film The Mighty Ducks. Since their inception, the team has played at the Honda Center (formerly known as the Arrowhead Pond), located in Anaheim, California, close to both Disneyland and Angel Stadium.

After initially struggling in their first two seasons, the Mighty Ducks improved under the leadership of center Paul Kariya, who led the team to their first two Stanley Cup playoffs appearances in 1997 and 1999 while forming a potent line with Teemu Selanne, and later rode the strong goaltending of Jean-Sebastien Giguere to a Cinderella run to the franchise's first Stanley Cup Final appearance in 2003, losing to the New Jersey Devils in seven games. Once Disney sold the franchise in 2005 to Henry and Susan Samueli, the team's name was changed to the Anaheim Ducks before the 2006–07 season, where the Ducks won the Stanley Cup in five games over the Ottawa Senators.

== 1993–2004: The Disney era ==
The Mighty Ducks of Anaheim were founded in 1993 by The Walt Disney Company. The franchise was awarded by the NHL in December 1992, along with the rights to a Miami team that became the Florida Panthers. An entrance fee of $50 million was required, half of which Disney paid to the Los Angeles Kings as compensation for sharing the Southern California NHL market. On March 1, 1993, at the brand-new Anaheim Arena – located a short distance east of Disneyland and across the Orange Freeway from Anaheim Stadium (which Disney was a minority owner) – the team received its name, inspired by the 1992 Disney movie The Mighty Ducks, based on a group of misfit kids who turn their losing youth hockey team into a winning team. Disney President Michael Eisner had already said on the December press conference that the film's success served as "our market research". As a result of the name adoption, the arena was named "The Pond", and Disney subsequently made an animated series called Mighty Ducks, featuring a fictional Mighty Ducks of Anaheim team consisting of anthropomorphized ducks led by the Mighty Duck Wild Wing.

Philadelphia-arena management specialist Tony Tavares was chosen to be team president, and Jack Ferreira, who previously helped create the San Jose Sharks, became the Ducks' general manager. The Ducks selected Ron Wilson to be their first head coach in team history. The Ducks and the expansion Florida Panthers team filled out their rosters in the 1993 NHL expansion draft and the 1993 NHL entry draft. In the former, a focus on defense led to goaltenders Guy Hebert and Glenn Healy being the first picks, followed by Alexei Kasatonov and Steven King. In the latter, the Ducks selected Paul Kariya as the fourth overall pick, who began play in only 1994 and became the face of the franchise for many years. The resulting roster had the lowest payroll of the NHL at only $7.9 million.

The franchise's first game was played at home on October 8, 1993, against the Detroit Red Wings, preceded by a 20-minute pregame show at the cost of $450,000. The Ducks lost 7–2. Two games later, on October 13, 1993, also on home ice, the Ducks won the first game in franchise history 4–3 over the Edmonton Oilers. The team won 14 of their first 38 games, including four road games in a row in November against Canadian Western Conference teams, and their first shut out in team history on December 15, 1993, a 1–0 win against the Toronto Maple Leafs. Led by captain Troy Loney, the Ducks entered February 1994 in eighth place in the Western Conference. However, any realistic chance the Ducks had of making the Stanley Cup playoffs ended with a 6–0 loss to the San Jose Sharks on April 1. The Ducks' finished the season 33–46–5, a record-breaking number of wins for an expansion team, which the Florida Panthers also achieved. The Ducks sold out 27 of 41 home games, including the last 25, and filled the Arrowhead Pond to 98.9% of its season capacity. Ducks licensed merchandise shot to number one in sales among NHL clubs, helped by their presence in Disney's theme parks and Disney Stores. Near the end of the season, Disney President Frank Wells died in a helicopter accident on April 3, 1994. They honored him by wearing Mickey Mouse patches with the initials "FGW" on them. Steve Rucchin was selected second overall in the 1994 supplemental draft.

With the 1994–95 NHL lockout in place, the Mighty Ducks did not play on the ice again until January 20, 1995. The shortened season marked the debut of Paul Kariya, who played in 47 of the team's 48 games that year, scoring 18 goals and 21 assists for 39 points. The Ducks had another respectable season, going 16–27–5. The 1995–96 season marked a big change for the team, especially for second-year superstar Kariya. During the season, he was chosen to play for the Western Conference in the 1996 NHL All-Star Game as the lone Ducks representative. At the time of his selection, January 1996, he was ranked 14th in the NHL scoring with 51 points (23 goals and 28 assists) over 42 games. However, despite his efforts, the Ducks were a low-scoring team.

=== Taste of success ===
On February 7, 1996, the Mighty Ducks made a blockbuster deal with the Winnipeg Jets, sending Chad Kilger, Oleg Tverdovsky and a third-round draft pick to the Jets in exchange for Marc Chouinard, a fourth-round draft pick and, most notably, star right winger Teemu Selanne. Following the trade, Ducks centre Steve Rucchin commented, "Paul [Kariya] had a lot of pressure on him... He singlehandedly won some games for us this year... Now that we have Teemu, there's no way everybody can just key on Paul." These three players formed one of the most potent lines of their time. Although the trade proved to be an important effort in the team, they still finished short of the playoffs, losing the eight spot in the West to the Jets based on the number of wins.

During the 1996–97 season, Kariya became team captain following Randy Ladouceur's retirement in the off-season, and led the Ducks to their first post-season appearance, after recording the franchise's first winning record of 36–33–13, good enough for home ice in first-round playoff series as the number four seed against the Phoenix Coyotes. Selanne ended the season second in the NHL with 109 points—which remains a team record—while Kariya ended the season third with 99 points. The Ducks won the first two games at home but then lost the next three. Game 6 went to overtime, where Kariya tied the series with a slapshot that beat goaltender Nikolai Khabibulin. The Mighty Ducks went on to win Game 7 at home to win their inaugural playoff series. However, Anaheim was swept by the eventual Stanley Cup champion Detroit Red Wings in the second round. Despite the four-game sweep, all four games were closely contested in the series; three went into overtime, including one that went into double overtime and one went into triple overtime.

The 1997–98 season was the worst in Mighty Ducks history as the team finished with a disappointing 26–43–13 record. Kariya was injured and Selanne provided the only real source of offense for the Ducks. Despite the team's lack of success, Selanne finished the season tied for first in the NHL in goals with 52, still a team record, and eighth in the NHL in points with 86.

The 1998–99 season was a marked improvement for the Mighty Ducks, as Kariya was once again healthy and the team was a strong contender for the 1999 playoffs. Late in the season, Anaheim had the chance to face Phoenix, a team they played well against that season, in the first round due to Phoenix holding fourth seed and the Mighty Ducks holding fifth. However, a late-season cold streak dropped the Ducks to sixth, matching them up with third-seeded Detroit, whom they did not play well against. Selanne won the inaugural Maurice "Rocket" Richard Trophy—awarded to the individual with the most goals in the NHL–after scoring 47. Additionally, Kariya ended the season third in the NHL with 62 assists, while Selanne placed fourth, with 60. Selanne finished the season second in the NHL with 107 points with Kariya following in third with 101 points. However, the Mighty Ducks were again swept by the Red Wings, this time in a more convincing manner than in 1997, ending with a 3–0 loss on home ice.

Once again the Mighty Ducks regressed during the 1999–2000 season, finishing with a mediocre 34–33–12–3 record (83 points), putting them in last place in the Pacific. They missed the playoffs by four points, as the rival San Jose Sharks took eighth place that year with 87 points. Despite this, the Mighty Ducks scored more goals than the Western Conference champion Dallas Stars. Kariya finished fourth in the NHL in goals, with 42, while Selanne seventh in assists, with 52. Points-wise, Kariya and Selanne finished fourth (86) and fifth (85), respectively. During the subsequent off-season, the Mighty Ducks made a trade that paid major dividends in later years—the team sent a second-round draft pick to the Calgary Flames in exchange for goaltender Jean-Sebastien Giguere.

The 2000–01 season saw Anaheim finish last in the Division with a 25–41–11–5 record (66 points). Late in the season, on March 5, 2001, fan-favorite and prolific scorer Teemu Selanne was traded to the San Jose Sharks in exchange for Jeff Friesen, Steve Shields and a second-round draft pick.

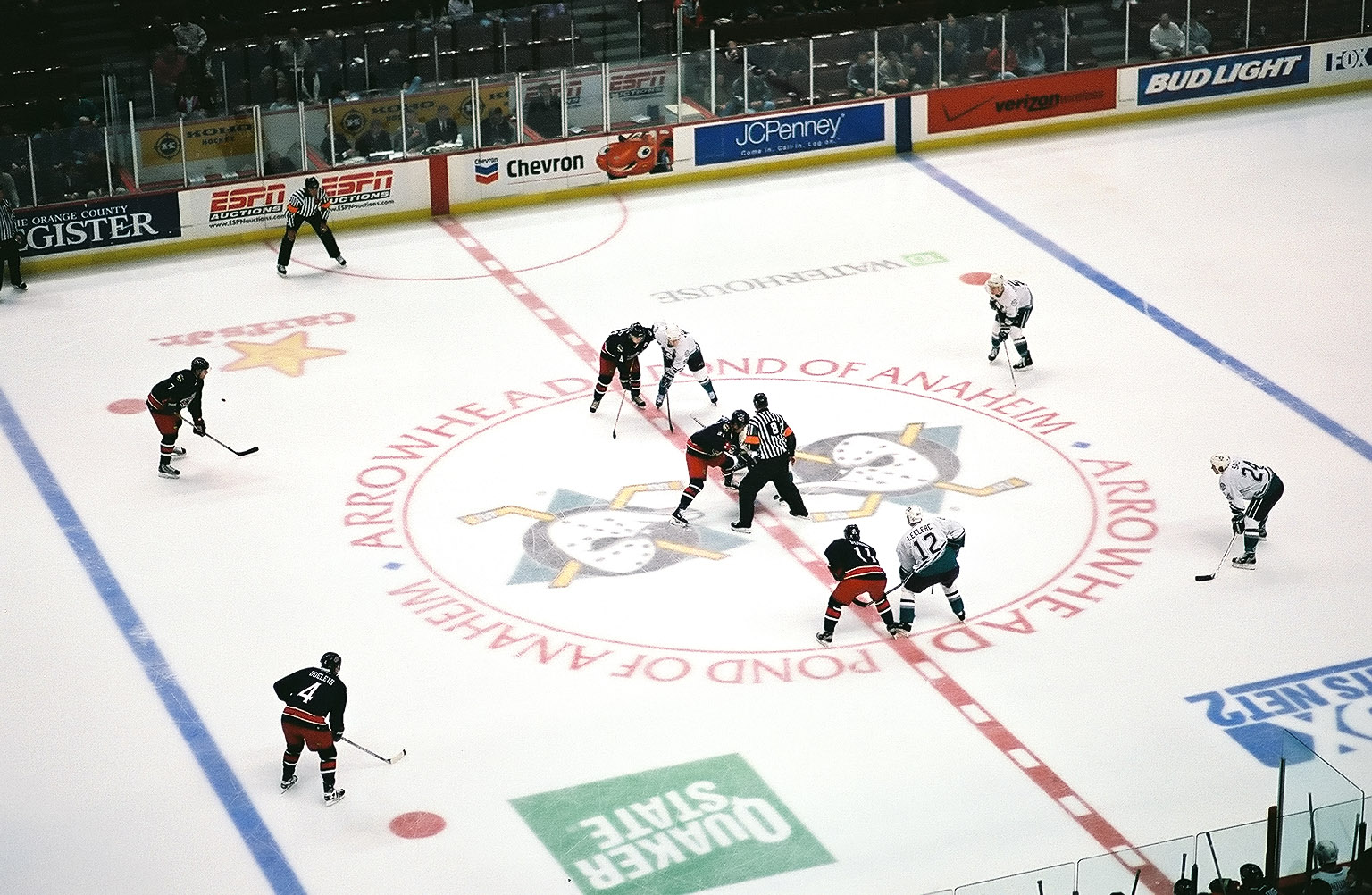
A game between the Mighty Ducks and the Columbus Blue Jackets at the Arrowhead Pond March 2002.

During the 2001–02 season, the Mighty Ducks once again finished last in the Pacific Division after posting a 29–42–8–3 record for 69 points. During the off-season, the team signed unrestricted free agent Adam Oates, also trading Jeff Friesen and Oleg Tverdovsky to the New Jersey Devils in exchange for Petr Sykora, Mike Commodore and Jean-Francois Damphousse. The trade later became valuable for both teams.

=== 2002–03 season: A trip to the Final ===
The 2002–03 was a different story for Anaheim. With a new head coach in Mike Babcock, the Mighty Ducks were one of the best teams during the second half of the season, finishing with a record of 40–27–9–6 for 95 points. At the NHL trade deadline, the team sent Jean-Francois Damphousse and Mike Commodore to Calgary in exchange for Rob Niedermayer. The Mighty Ducks also picked up Steve Thomas from the Chicago Blackhawks for a fifth-round draft pick. After a three-year playoff hiatus, Anaheim qualified for the 2003 playoffs. However, for the third-straight post-season in which they participated in, the Mighty Ducks met the defending Stanley Cup champion Red Wings as the seventh seed. This time, Anaheim shocked the hockey world as they swept Detroit in the series, with Steve Rucchin's series-clincher on goaltender Curtis Joseph coming in overtime of game four. The Ducks then defeated the top-seeded Dallas Stars in six games in the Western Conference Semifinals, which was noted for game one being the fourth-longest game in NHL history, with the Ducks winning in the fifth overtime period from a Petr Sykora goal. In the Conference Finals, the Ducks made quick work of the upstart Minnesota Wild, allowing only one goal the entire series, to earn their first-ever Western Conference championship and berth in the Stanley Cup Final. Jean-Sebastien Giguere became a celebrity in Southern California with his outstanding play. Giguere posted a shutout streak in the Western Conference Finals of 217 minutes, 54 seconds. In between the Conference Finals and the Stanley Cup Final, Giguere appeared on The Tonight Show with Jay Leno.

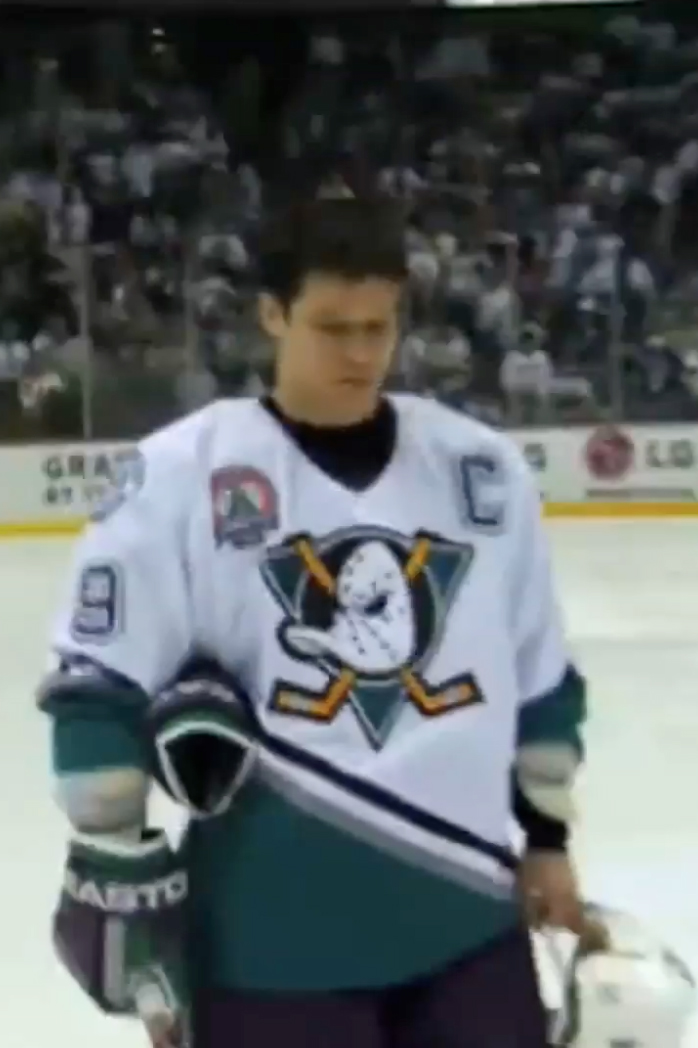
Mighty Ducks captain Paul Kariya during the 2003 Stanley Cup Final.

The 2003 Stanley Cup Final against the New Jersey Devils was a battle between two elite goaltenders, Martin Brodeur for New Jersey and Giguere for Anaheim. It was also noted for two brothers, Rob Niedermayer for the Ducks, and his older brother Scott Niedermayer for the Devils, competing for the same prize. Quite possibly the most memorable moment of the series occurred during game six in Anaheim. At center ice, Kariya received a fierce, blind side body check from New Jersey captain Scott Stevens. Kariya was knocked out and sent to the dressing room. However, 11 minutes later, Kariya returned from the dressing room and scored the fourth goal of the game to help the Ducks tie the series with a 5–2 victory. Despite drawing even in the series, Anaheim could not complete their Cinderella run, losing a hard-fought game seven tilt to the Devils, 3–0. The series was also noted because every game was won by the home team. For his fine play during the post-season, Giguere won the Conn Smythe Trophy as Most Valuable Player of the playoffs, becoming just the fifth player, and fourth goaltender, in NHL history to have won the Trophy as a member of the losing team. Giguere had 15–6 record—7–0 in games going into overtime—with a 1.62 goals against average (GAA), a .945 save percentage and an NHL-record 168-minute, 27-second shutout streak in overtime. This was the third coast-to-coast Final, following 1982 and 1994; both times, the Vancouver Canucks had Cinderella runs halted; in 1982 by the New York Islanders and in 1994 by the New York Rangers. However, this was the first coast-to-coast Final played entirely in the United States.

At the following 2003 NHL entry draft, the Ducks traded to get two first round draft picks. With those picks, the team selected Ryan Getzlaf 19th overall and Corey Perry 28th overall, two eventual franchise cornerstones.

=== 2003–04 season: Disappointment ===
During the off-season, the Mighty Ducks were dealt a major blow after their captain Paul Kariya opted to sign a free agent contract with the Colorado Avalanche. In so doing, Kariya reunited with Teemu Selanne, who had also signed with Colorado after two seasons with San Jose in an attempt to win the Stanley Cup. However, the Mighty Ducks did fill Kariya's gap by signing star free agent Sergei Fedorov from Detroit and Vaclav Prospal from the Tampa Bay Lightning. Despite the signings and high expectations from the previous year, the 2003–04 was a major disappointment for the Ducks and Conn Smythe Jean-Sebastien Giguere, as the Ducks failed to make the playoffs after amassing a record of 29–35–10–8 (76 points) for a fourth-place finish in the Pacific Division. The team also suffered low attendance figures despite their deep playoff run the previous year.

== 2004–present: The Samueli era ==
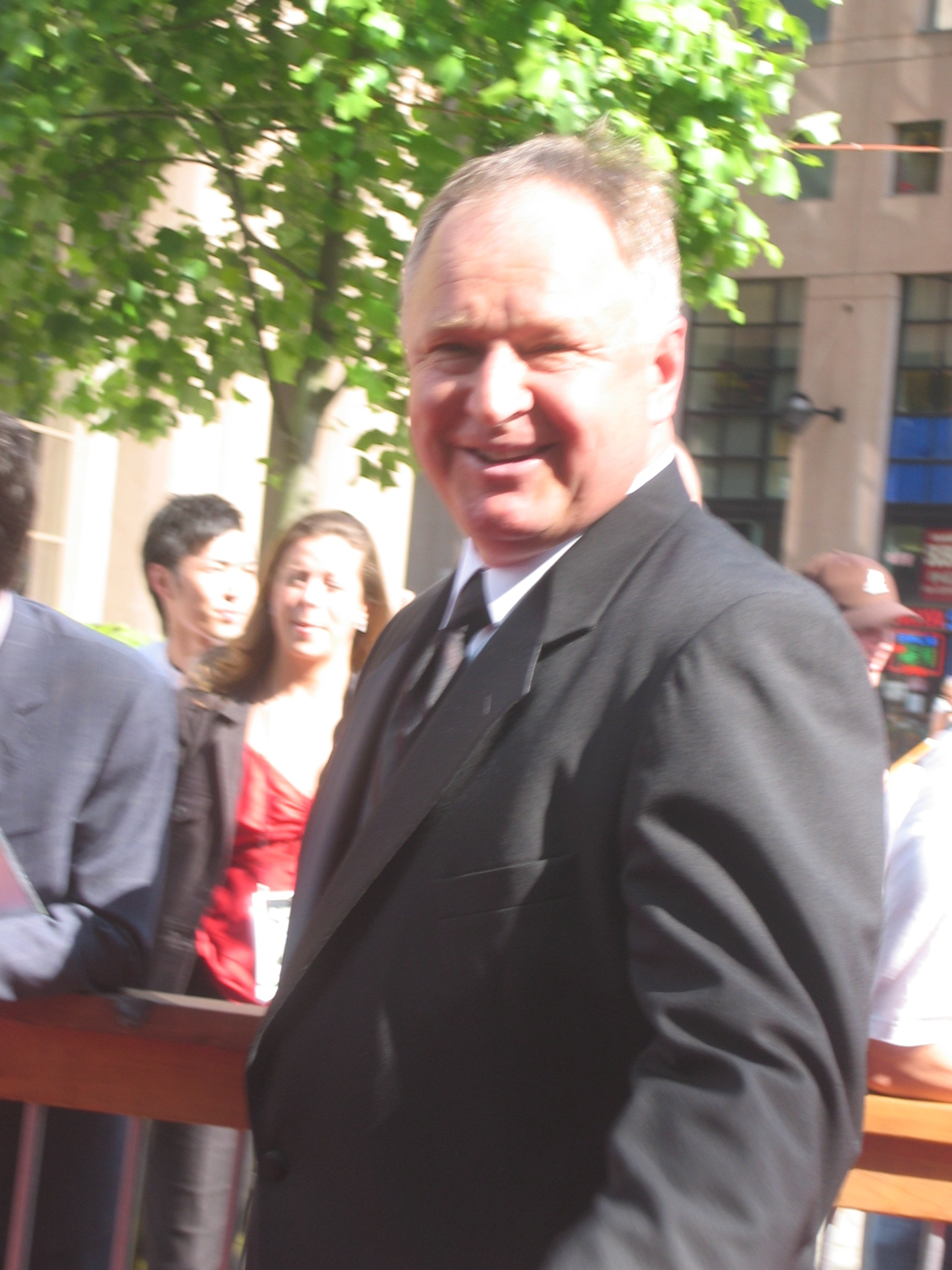
Randy Carlyle in June 2006, a year after he named the Anaheim's head coach.

During the summer of 2004, as the NHL and the National Hockey League Players' Association (NHLPA)'s labor dispute was headed towards a season-long lockout, Disney tried to sell the team, but received a low offer of US$40 million, less than the franchise's original price. In 2005, Broadcom Corporation co-founder Henry Samueli of Irvine, California, and his wife Susan bought the Mighty Ducks from The Walt Disney Company for a reported US$75 million. The Samuelis pledged to keep the team in Anaheim, unlike Arturo Moreno did when he purchased the Los Angeles Angels of Anaheim from Disney and decided to turn the team into a Los Angeles-based franchise (though still based in Anaheim at Angel Stadium).

Brian Burke, former president and general manager of the Vancouver Canucks, was subsequently appointed the general manager and executive vice-president of the Mighty Ducks on June 20, 2005. On August 1, 2005, former James Norris Memorial Trophy-winning defenceman Randy Carlyle was hired as the seventh coach in team history. Burke was familiar with Carlyle's coaching ability, as the latter had coached the Manitoba Moose from 1996 to 2001 (International Hockey League) and 2004–05 (American Hockey League); the Moose had been the Canucks' farm club since 2001. Carlyle replaced Mike Babcock, who later signed on to serve as head coach of the Detroit Red Wings.

The NHL held the 2005 NHL entry draft in July after the lockout had ended. This was dubbed the "Sidney Crosby Draft" and all 30 NHL organizations were given the opportunity to obtain the number one pick via a "draft lottery". The Ducks came close, receiving the second overall pick, which they used to selected American forward Bobby Ryan from the Owen Sound Attack.

Also during the summer of 2005, Anaheim brought back fan favorite Teemu Selanne after an injury-filled season with Colorado. A rejuvenated Selanne scored 40 goals, the most he had scored since the 1998–99 season in which he scored 47. The team also made their first big free agency splash under Brian Burke when he signed defenceman Scott Niedermayer—the 2004 Norris Trophy winner and older brother of Ducks forward Rob Niedermayer—to a four-year contract.

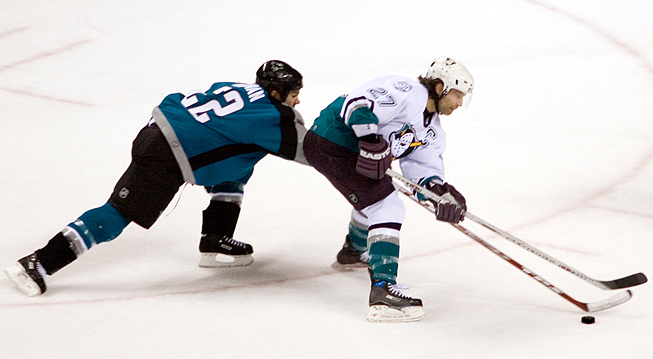
Scott Hannan chases Scott Niedermayer during the 2004–05 season, Niedermayer's first with the Mighty Ducks.

The 2005–06 season saw the Ducks trade away big-name players with big contracts, including Petr Sykora and Sergei Fedorov, in favor of younger players, such as former first round picks Ryan Getzlaf, Corey Perry and Joffrey Lupul, as well college free agent signing Chris Kunitz. However, the Ducks had a rough start to the season, but the plan was ultimately successful. The Ducks became one of the best teams in the NHL down the stretch and earned the sixth seed in the West and playoff matchup with the Calgary Flames. In an interesting playoff where the bottom four seeds all eliminated the top four seeds, the Ducks defeated the heavily favored Flames in seven games. The Mighty Ducks shut-out the Flames 3–0 in Game 7 in Calgary. In the second round, the Ducks then swept the Colorado Avalanche, riding the outstanding play of backup goaltender Ilya Bryzgalov. (Bryzgalov had previously taken over for Giguere during the first round due to an injury to the Mighty Ducks' starting goaltender, and went on to break Giguere's 2003 shutout streak.) The Mighty Ducks had home ice advantage in their second Western Conference Final against the equally surprising eighth-seeded Edmonton Oilers. However, the Mighty Ducks dropped the first three games of the series, won game four but then lost the series in game five at home. Selanne won the Bill Masterton Memorial Trophy at the end of the season for his dedication to the sport of hockey.

On January 26, 2006, the team announced, effective with the 2006–07 season, a name change to the Anaheim Ducks. This included logo and team color changes which were unveiled at a ceremony five months later. Many Ducks fans successfully petitioned the Samuelis to keep Wild Wing as the current mascot because of the team's recent success and as a link to the past. Along with the new name, their home ice (the Arrowhead Pond of Anaheim) was renamed Honda Center, as Arrowhead Water's naming rights had expired.

=== 2006–07: The Stanley Cup arrives in Anaheim ===
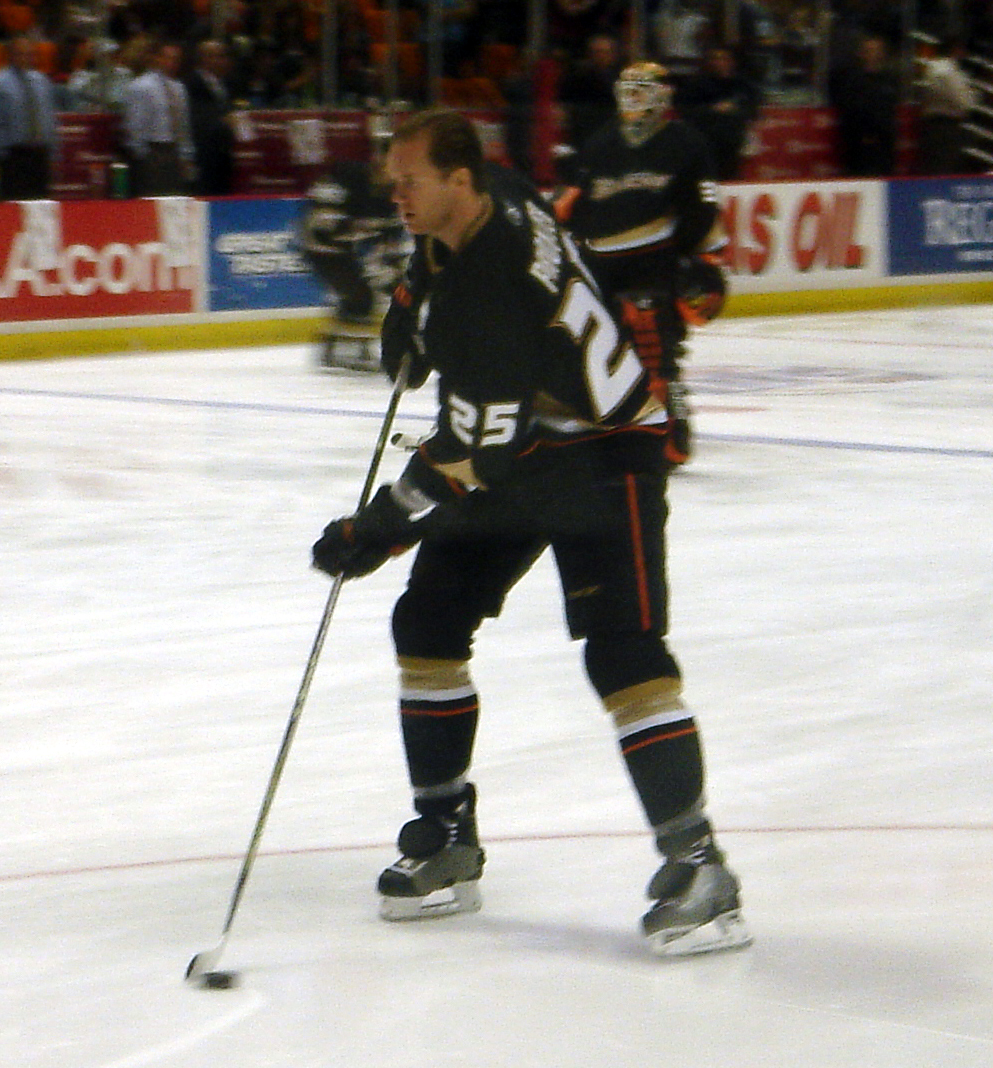
Chris Pronger was acquired through a trade with the Edmonton Oilers in July 2006.

On July 3, 2006, the Ducks traded young sniper Joffrey Lupul, defensive prospect Ladislav Šmid, a 2007 first-round draft pick, a second-round choice in 2008 and a conditional first-round selection in 2008 to the Edmonton Oilers in exchange for star defenceman Chris Pronger, who had publicly requested a trade from the Oilers ten days earlier citing personal reasons, with many speculating his wife was unhappy living in Edmonton.

With stars Pronger and Scott Niedermayer on defense, the Ducks were picked by several publications as a favorite to win the 2007 Stanley Cup, and they began the 2006–07 season on fire. On November 9, 2006, the Ducks defeated the Vancouver Canucks 6–0 at General Motors Place to improve their season record to 12–0–4. The win set an NHL open-era record by remaining undefeated in regulation for the first 16 games of the season, eclipsing the previous mark set by the 1983–84 Edmonton Oilers. They were subsequently shut-out by Calgary the following game, 3–0, ending their streak. On December 12, the Ducks defeated the Florida Panthers on the road, 5–4, breaking a franchise record for their sixth-straight road win. They also improved their record that night to 24–3–6 for 54 points; no team having played 33 games had ever reached 54 points since the 1979 Philadelphia Flyers. The next night, the Ducks beat the Atlanta Thrashers to improve their road record to 12–1–2, with their 26 points form away games setting the NHL record for the most points on the road through 15 games. The previous record-holders, the 1951–52 Detroit Red Wings, had 25 points (10–0–5).

On January 16, 2007, the Ducks played in their franchise's 1,000th regular season game , and on March 11, the Ducks recorded their franchise's 1,000th point with a 4–2 win over Vancouver, which improved their franchise all-time record to 423–444–155 (1,001 points) . On April 7, the Ducks won their first Pacific Division title in franchise history when Vancouver defeated the second-place San Jose Sharks at HP Pavilion in the Sharks' final game of the season. Anaheim also played their last game of the 2006–07 season that day against the Columbus Blue Jackets, winning 4–3 and finishing the season with a total of 110 points for the first 100-point season in franchise history. This was good enough for the fourth-best record in the NHL, behind the Buffalo Sabres, Detroit Red Wings and Nashville Predators. Although the team had three fewer wins than the Predators, the Ducks were seeded second in the Western Conference playoffs by virtue of their Pacific Division title. Selanne finished the season third in the NHL in goals with 48, the most he had scored since the 1997–98.

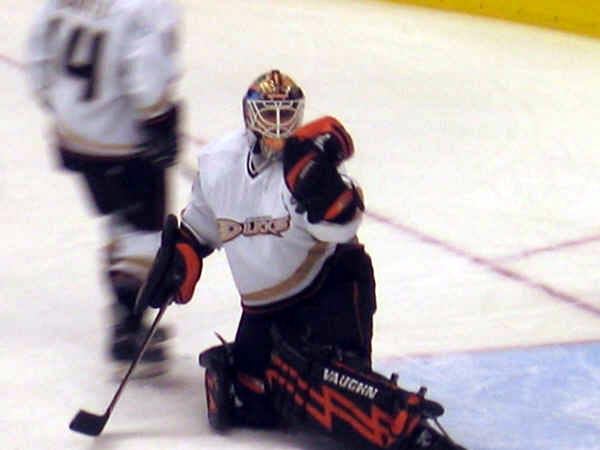
Ilya Bryzgalov warms up before a Stanley Cup playoffs game.

In the 2007 Western Conference Quarterfinals, the Ducks met the Minnesota Wild, prevailing four games to one in the series. The team then faced Vancouver, the Northwest Division champions, in the Semifinals. After a split in Anaheim, the Ducks won Game 3 on a Corey Perry goal and Game 4 on an overtime goal by Travis Moen. Game 5 also went to double overtime. In the second overtime period, Rob Niedermayer laid a hit in the Canucks zone, where Scott Niedermayer collected the puck at the point and beat Roberto Luongo to win the series four games to one.

In their third Western Conference Final, they faced Detroit for the fourth time in the playoffs. The Ducks lost Game 1, 2–1, on a shot that deflected off of the glove of Francois Beauchemin, though in Game 2, the Ducks won in overtime on a shot by Scott Niedermayer. Game 3, at home, was perhaps the team's worst of the playoffs as they were routed 5–0. Chris Pronger was involved in a hit with Rob Niedermayer on Tomas Holmstrom, where he was later given a one-game suspension by the NHL. Without Pronger, the Ducks stepped up in game four and won 4–3. Game five in Detroit was a defensive battle. With the Red Wings up 1–0 in the third period, head coach Randy Carlyle pulled Jean-Sebastien Giguere on a power play and with less than a minute to play, Scott Niedermayer banked in the tying goal off the stick of Nicklas Lidstrom. In overtime, Andy McDonald caused a turnover in front of the Detroit net, where Selanne quickly scored the game winner over Dominik Hasek. In game six, the Ducks held on to win 4–3 to earn their second Western Conference championship.

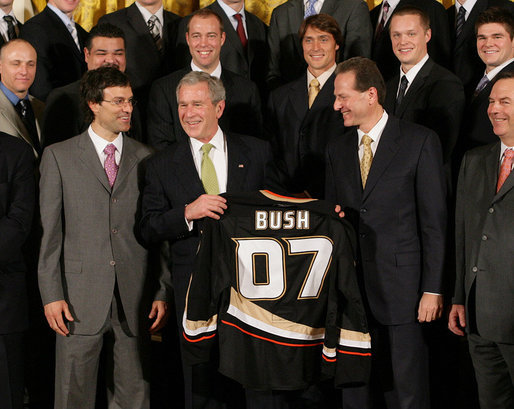
The champion Ducks are received by U.S. President George W. Bush at the White House.

The 2007 Stanley Cup Final pitted the Ducks against the Ottawa Senators. Ottawa was making their first appearance in the Finals. The Ducks fell behind 2–1 in game one at home, but in the third period, Ryan Getzlaf tied the game and with few minutes remaining, Rob Niedermayer fed Travis Moen in the slot for the game winner. Game two was a low-scoring but exciting game. The only goal came off the stick of Samuel Pahlsson to give the Ducks a two-game series lead. Game three saw the Ducks lose 5–3 on a controversial goal by Daniel Alfredsson; it appeared on replays Alfredsson kicked the puck into the net, but the officials ruled it a goal. However, once again Chris Pronger was suspended one game, this time for an elbow to the head of Dean McAmmond. Game four was tied at the end of the second period when more controversy arose—Senators captain Daniel Alfredsson appeared to shoot the puck intentionally at Scott Niedermayer, which set off a brawl at the end of the period. In the third period, Dustin Penner scored a goal from a Selanne pass to score the eventual game-winner in a 3–2 victory. On June 6, the Ducks defeated the Senators 6–2 at Honda Center to claim their first-ever Stanley Cup in franchise history. Scott Niedermayer was awarded the Conn Smythe Trophy as playoff MVP, the second Duck to win the award after Giguere did so in 2003. After their championship victory, the Ducks became the first Californian team, and the first West Coast team since the 1925 Victoria Cougars, to win the Stanley Cup.

=== 2007–08 season: Defending the Cup ===
After winning the Stanley Cup, Scott Niedermayer and Teemu Selanne stated their uncertainty about their return to the team for the 2007–08, both contemplating retirement. As a result of this indecision, general manager Brian Burke was active in the free agent market, eventually signing two veteran players in high-scoring defenseman Mathieu Schneider and gritty forward Todd Bertuzzi to two-year contracts to replace both Niedermayer and Selanne should the pair retire. Later on, Oilers general manager Kevin Lowe signed Dustin Penner to a restricted free agent offer sheet for $4.25 million per year over the next five. Burke called out Lowe, describing the action as a "classless move made by a desperate GM trying to save his job". Burke opted not to match the offer and in return, the Ducks received the Oilers' first-, second- and third-round draft picks as compensation.

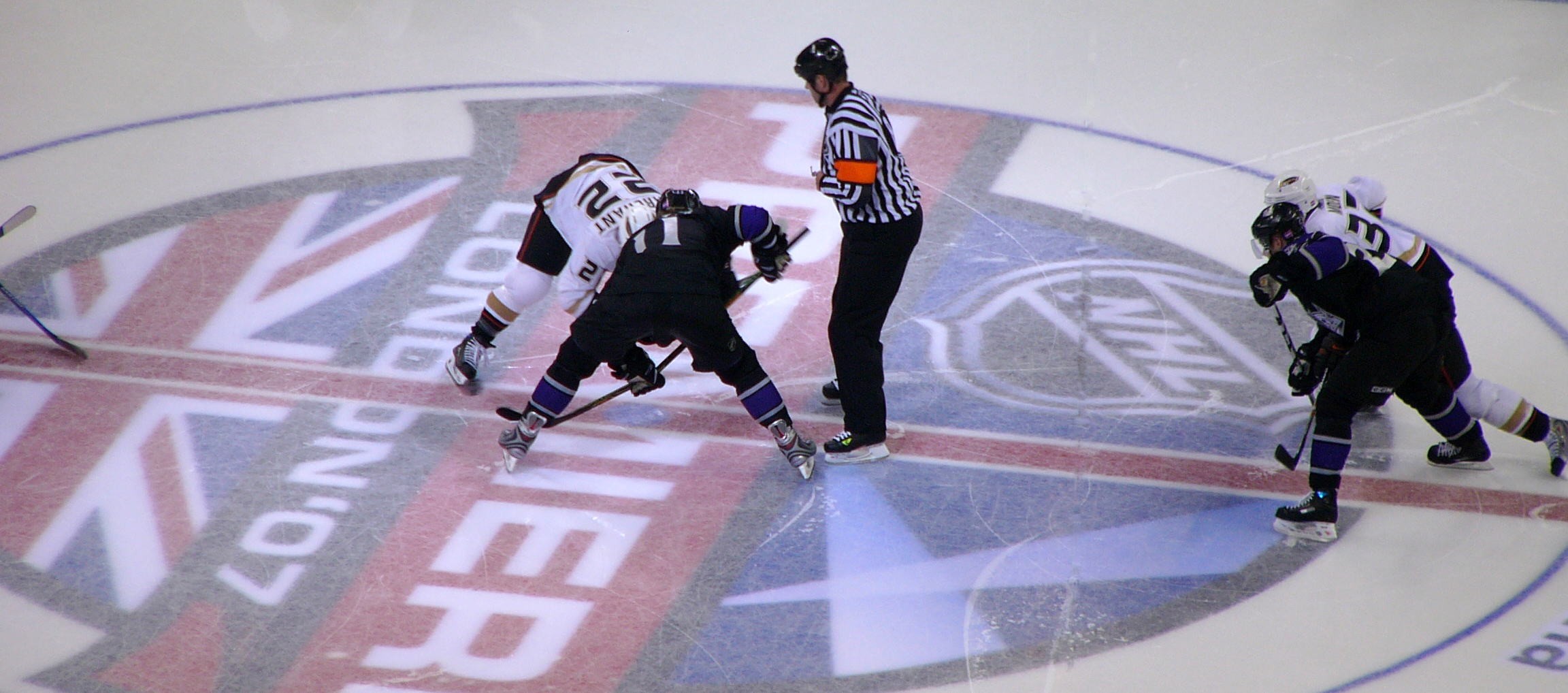
Face off during the first of a two-game set in London, United Kingdom, October 2007.

The Ducks began their Cup defense against the Los Angeles Kings for a two-game set in London, United Kingdom, without Niedermayer and Selanne (who were still pondering retirement) and an injured Pahlsson and Giguere, splitting the series. Highly touted prospect Bobby Ryan scored his first career NHL goal during the series. However, Ryan played only 23 games with the big club during the season, primarily playing in the AHL. On October 10, against the Boston Bruins, the Ducks raised their Pacific Division, Western Conference and Stanley Cup championship banners. However, it was a rough start overall for the Ducks, as they made minor trades to try and stay alive in the West. Burke said he would eventually let goaltender Ilya Bryzgalov go because he felt he deserved to have a starting position in the NHL. Burke ultimately made good on his promise and placed Bryzgalov on waivers, where he was acquired by the Phoenix Coyotes.

The drama surrounding Scott Niedermayer finally brought positive news for the Ducks, as Burke announced his return on December 5. December 14 marked an important event in Ducks history, as Burke dealt first line center Andy McDonald to the St. Louis Blues in exchange for Doug Weight, Michal Birner and a seventh-round draft pick in an attempt to clear salary cap space for Niedermayer, whereupon on December 16, Niedermayer made his return to the Ducks' lineup. The team immediately improved and reentered the playoff and Pacific Division pictures. For the 2008 NHL All-Star Game, Ryan Getzlaf and Chris Pronger were selected to participate. Later, Corey Perry and Scott Niedermayer were named as injury replacements, setting a Ducks franchise record for players representing the team at an All-Star Game, with four.

The Ducks received more good news on January 28, 2008, as Teemu Selanne opted not to retire and subsequently signed a one-year contract with Anaheim. The Ducks won nine out of their first ten games with Selanne in the line-up. At the trade deadline, the Ducks acquired defenseman Marc-Andre Bergeron from the New York Islanders and Jean-Sebastien Aubin from Los Angeles. With nine games to go in the regular season, Chris Pronger was suspended for the third time in an Anaheim uniform, receiving an eight-game ban for stomping on the leg of Vancouver's Ryan Kesler. The Ducks finished fourth in the Western Conference and began their defense of the Cup against Pacific Divisions rivals Dallas Stars. The Stars won the first two games, the Ducks won game three, and the Stars won again in game four. After an Anaheim win at Honda Center in game five, the Stars won game six, thus ending the Ducks' chance of a repeat Cup.

=== 2008–09 season: More playoff success ===
With the Ducks having a longer off-season than of the recent two seasons, they often found themselves in the middle of media headlines.

Off the ice, the feud between general manager Brian Burke and former Oilers general manager Kevin Lowe heated, as once again words were thrown between both in the media. NHL commissioner Gary Bettman ordered the feud to "cease and desist". Moreover, Ducks team owner Henry Samueli was imprisoned for lying to the Securities and Exchange Commission judge about a fraudulent business operation. Bettman gave interim ownership of the team to Anaheim Ducks CEO Michael Schulman, as the Samuelis were banned from any contact with the Ducks whatsoever.

Later on, the Ducks placed Todd Bertuzzi on waivers, where he failed to be claimed by any team and subsequently became an unrestricted free agent, eventually signing with the Calgary Flames. Entering the off-season, the Ducks were looking to fill the void left on the second-line center position ever since Andy McDonald was traded to St. Louis. The team opted to sign the Vancouver Canucks center Brendan Morrison to a one-year deal. More good news abounded, as Scott Niedermayer announced his return for another season. The Ducks also signed Corey Perry to a six-year contract extension. However, despite all the off-season moves, the Ducks were still in a vice cap-wise, and in turn dealt Mathieu Schneider to the Atlanta Thrashers in exchange for Ken Klee, Brad Larsen and minor-leaguer Chad Painchaud. Moving Schneider to Atlanta freed-up enough cap room to re-sign Teemu Selanne, who was previously signed to a professional tryout contract in the pre-season to ensure no team would send a counter offer in his direction. Veteran defenseman Sean O'Donnell was dealt to Los Angeles for a conditional third-round draft pick a few days into the pre-season in what Brian Burke called a cap-related move.

After a franchise-record 6–1–1 pre-season, the Ducks opened the regular season in San Jose, taking on the Sharks in a 4–1 loss for the Ducks. Days later, the Ducks held their home opener on October 12, 2008, as they hosted a young and refreshed Phoenix Coyotes team. The Ducks dropped the game 4–2 in front of a sold-out home crowd.

The Ducks struggled to start the season, going 1–5, but reversed the sluggish start with a sweep of a four-game road trip, winning games in Toronto, Ottawa, Montreal and Columbus. The Ducks won eight of nine games from there before adversity struck. Defenseman Francois Beauchemin suffered a torn anterior cruciate ligament (ACL) after taking a slapshot off the ankle in a game against Nashville. Days later, Brian Burke resigned from his position as general manager, handing over the reigns to right-hand man Bob Murray as the former leave to take the same position with the Toronto Maple Leafs just days later. Young forward Bobby Ryan was then called up to the team from the Iowa Chops, the Ducks' AHL affiliate. Reports indicated Ryan was good enough to make the team out of camp but was sent down only due to salary cap restraints. The Ducks continued to play better, but went only 9–13–2 heading to the All-Star break. Three Anaheim Ducks players, Ryan Getzlaf, Jean-Sebastien Giguere and Scott Niedermayer, were all named starters for the NHL All-Star Game, held in Montreal. However, the Ducks' fortunes, did not change much after the break, as the team lost four out of their next six games.

As the NHL trade deadline approached, the Ducks were considered one of the more interesting teams because they were right on the cusp of being a seller. Several high-profile players were said to be on the trading block, including defensemen Chris Pronger and Scott Niedermayer. In the end, neither was ultimately dealt but the Ducks did make one move before the deadline; Chris Kunitz, as well as prospect Eric Tangradi, was sent to the Pittsburgh Penguins on February 27 in exchange for defenseman Ryan Whitney. General manager Bob Murray explained the team needed to "re-tool the defense with a good puck moving defenseman". On trade deadline day, the Ducks were busy. The team placed center Brian Morrison on waivers—where he was claimed by Dallas—acquired forward Erik Christensen from Atlanta for prospect Eric O'Dell and they traded Samuel Pahlsson to the Chicago Blackhawks for defenseman James Wisniewski and prospect Petri Kontiola. Anaheim also traded Travis Moen and defenseman Kent Huskins to San Jose in exchange for prospect Nick Bonino and goaltending prospect Timo Pielmeier; Steve Montador was also moved, going to Boston in exchange for Finnish forward Petteri Nokelainen.

With the core of the team still intact, a re-vamped defense, a new top line consisting of Bobby Ryan, Ryan Getzlaf and Corey Perry and a whole new bottom-six forward set-up, the Ducks dug-in in an attempt to make the playoffs for the fourth-straight year. On March 18, the Ducks found themselves 13th place in the West, but a strong 10–2–1 finish catapulted the team into the playoffs, all culminating with a 4–3 shootout victory against Dallas. The team finished with a 42–33–7 record with 91 points to place them second in the Pacific and eighth in the West, earning them a matchup with the Presidents' Trophy-winning San Jose Sharks. At the end of the regular season, Getzlaf broke the team record for most assists in a year, with 66, while Ryan broke a Ducks rookie record and led all NHL rookies with 31 goals, as well as with 57 points.

The Ducks–Sharks Conference Quarterfinals was only the second series in NHL history to pit two Californian teams against one another; the first took place in 1968–69 between the Los Angeles Kings and the Oakland Seals. The Ducks stunned the Sharks by winning the first two games in San Jose 2–0 and 3–2. Jonas Hiller took over the starting job from Giguere and recorded his first NHL playoff shutout. Back at home for game three, the game was tied at three in the third period when Corey Perry took a hooking penalty and Patrick Marleau scored on the ensuing power play to win the game. Game four was completely dominated by the Ducks, prevailing 4–0. The first chance for the Ducks to eliminate the Sharks came in game five at San Jose which went into overtime where once again Marleau was the hero after scoring the game-winner. In game six, the Ducks received goals from Perry, Selanne, Beauchemin and Getzlaf to win the game 4–1 and the series four games to two. The Ducks became just the fourth team to beat the Presidents' Trophy winner in the playoffs' first round. In the Conference Semifinals, the Ducks faced a familiar foe in the Detroit Red Wings. In game one, Nicklas Lidstrom scored in the final minute to win it for Detroit, 3–2. In game two, Todd Marchant scored in triple overtime to even the series at one game apiece. It was the first playoff game to go at least three overtimes for the Ducks since game one of the 2003 Conference Semifinals against Dallas. (That game had ended after five overtime periods.) The Ducks won game three on a controversial goal scored by Marian Hossa. The referee claimed to have blown the whistle before the puck went in. Game four was all Detroit by a final score of 6–3. Hiller was pulled in the third period after giving up five goals. A pivotal game five was won by the Red Wings, 4–1. However, the Ducks evened the series at three with a 2–1 win the game six. In the Ducks' first game seven since the 2006 Conference Quarterfinals against Calgary, Detroit got out to a 2–0 lead. Selanne then scored a power play goal to cut the lead, but Detroit scored again to make it 3–1. Perry scored next to trim the lead to 3–2 and in the third period, Ryan scored to tie the game at 3–3. However, Detroit's Daniel Cleary scored with three minutes left in regulation to end the Ducks' season.

=== 2009–10 season: New team, new look ===
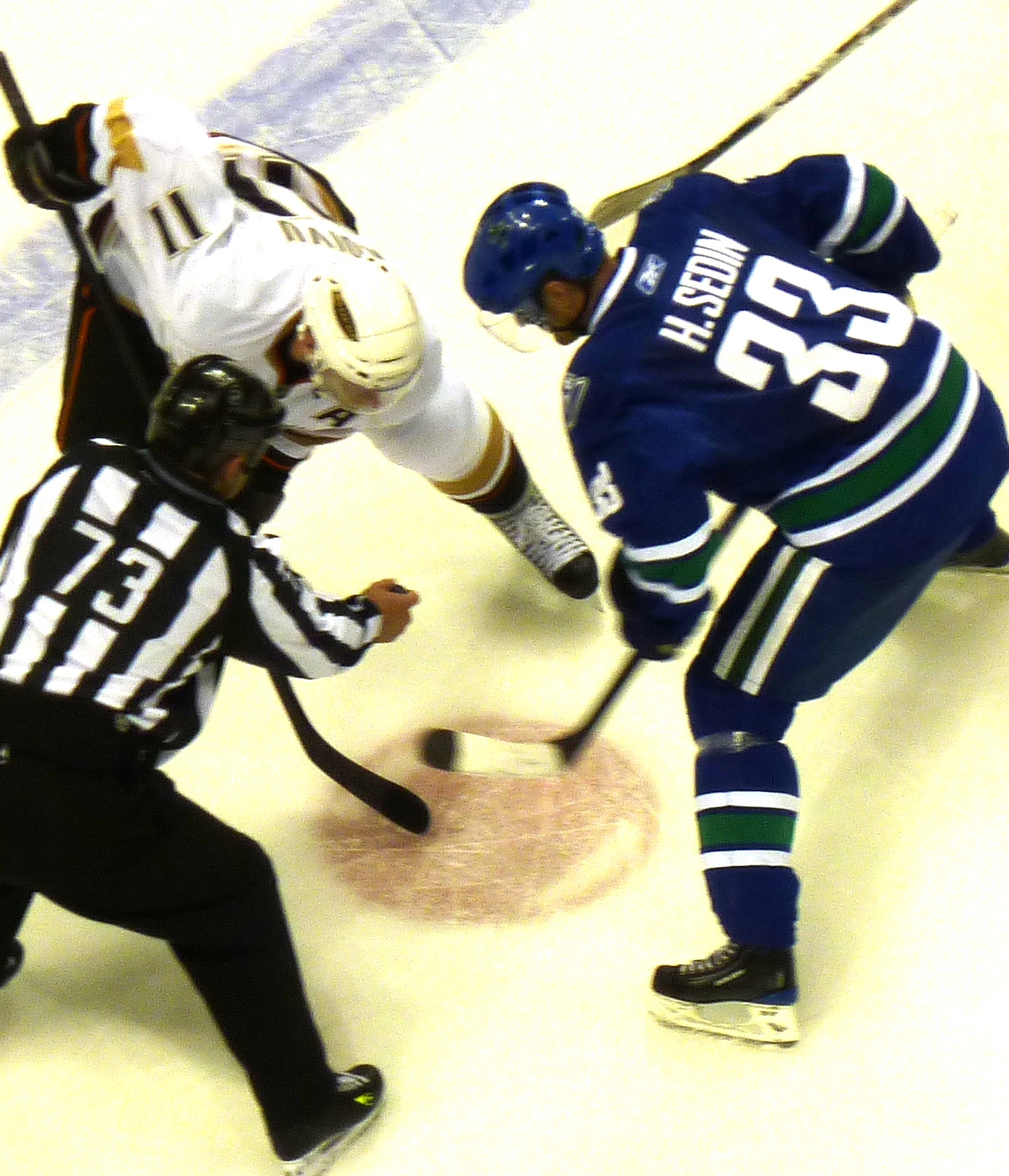
Saku Koivu prepares to take a face off against Henrik Sedin of the Vancouver Canucks, December 2009.

With news on draft day that Scott Niedermayer signed a one-year contract extension and that Teemu Selanne intended to fulfill the last year of his contract, the Ducks traded Chris Pronger to the Philadelphia Flyers in exchange for Joffery Lupul, defenseman Luca Sbisa and the Flyers' first-round pick in 2009 and 2010. On July 8, the Ducks signed former Montreal Canadiens captain Saku Koivu to a one-year contract. Another slow start doomed the Ducks. Before the trade deadline, the Ducks traded Giguere to the Toronto Maple Leafs in exchange for Jason Blake and Vesa Toskala after signing Hiller to a contract extension. The trade deadline saw the Ducks trade Ryan Whitney to Edmonton for offensive defenseman Lubomir Visnovsky, as well as the acquisitions of defenseman Aaron Ward from the Carolina Hurricanes and goaltender Curtis McElhinney from the Calgary Flames. The Ducks played through frequent injuries and picked up play in the second half of the season, but struggled coming out of the Olympic break. For the first time since the lockout, the Ducks failed to make the playoffs with a 39–32–11 record. The 2010 off-season was also busy for the Ducks, as Scott Niedermayer announced his retirement in a June press conference. Niedermayer decided to stay a member of the Ducks as a team consultant. The Ducks resigned Saku Koivu for two years and signed free agent defenseman Toni Lydman to a three-year contract. In addition to Lydman, the Ducks were able to get defenseman Cam Fowler via the draft, and 35-year-old strong-willed defenseman Andy Sutton signed to a two-year deal. Restricted free agent Bobby Ryan was signed to a five-year contract.

=== 2010–2018 ===
The 2010–11 season did not begin well for the Ducks, who lost their first three games. They maintained a .500 throughout record through the first half of the season, but found their rhythm and finished 47–30–5, good for 99 points and fourth place in the Western Conference. Corey Perry and Jonas Hiller represented the Ducks at the All-Star Game, and Corey Perry went on to have a 50-goal, 98-point season, which won him the Maurice "Rocket" Richard Trophy and Hart Memorial Trophy. He became the first-ever Duck to win the Hart, as well as the first Richard winner as a Duck since Teemu Selänne won the award in 1999. However, Hiller was injured at the All-Star Game and missed the rest of the season. Even though the Ducks had a great season led by Perry, Hiller, Selänne, Lubomir Visnovsky and Ryan Getzlaf, they lost in the first round of the 2011 playoffs to the fifth-seeded Nashville Predators.

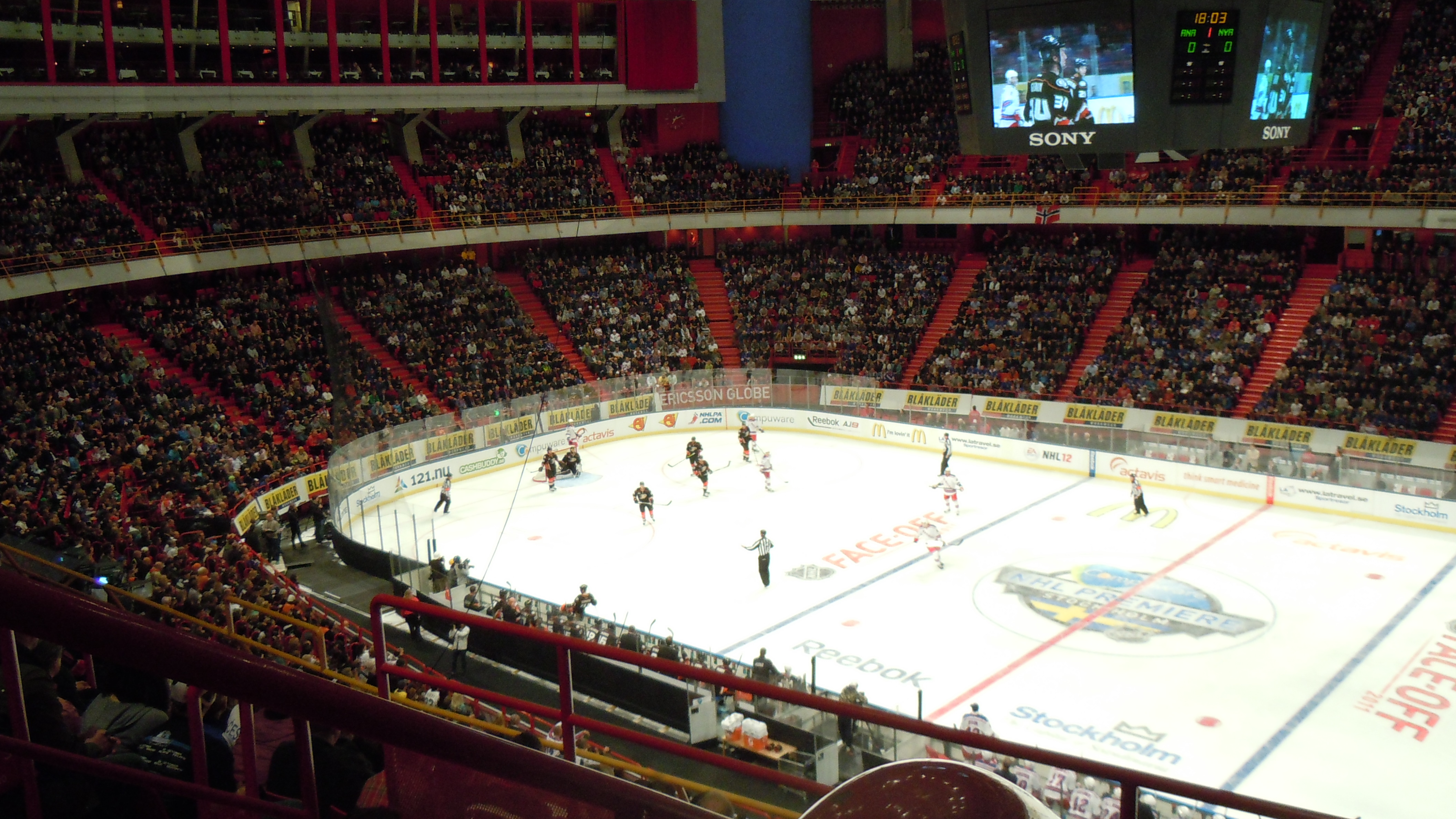
The Ducks played the New York Rangers in Stockholm to open the 2011 season.

Before the 2011–12 season began, the team mourned the loss of former Mighty Duck Ruslan Salei, who died in a plane crash with several other former NHL players of Kontinental Hockey League (KHL) club Lokomotiv Yaroslavl. The team wore a black patch with his former jersey number, 24, in current team numbering. The Ducks started the season with NHL Premiere games in Helsinki and Stockholm. This was the third time in franchise history that they started the regular season with games in Europe. They lost 4–1 to the Buffalo Sabres in Helsinki but defeated the New York Rangers 2–1 after a shootout in Stockholm. After a slow start to the season, the Ducks replaced head coach Randy Carlyle with former Washington Capitals head coach Bruce Boudreau. The rest of the season was mostly forgettable, as the Ducks could not get out of the hole they dug themselves in the first half of the season, and ultimately failed to reach the playoffs in the 2011–12 season.

The 2012–13 season was shortened to 48 games due to a labor lockout. When play resumed in January 2013 after a new NHL collective bargaining agreement was signed, the Ducks opened the season by sweeping a two-game Canadian road trip with a decisive 7–3 victory against the Vancouver Canucks on January 19, followed by a 5–4 decision against the Calgary Flames on January 21. Their home opener came on January 25, also against the Canucks, who prevailed 5–0. The distinction of the Ducks' longest homestand was split between two five-game stretches from March 18–25 and from April 3–10. Anaheim's lengthiest road trip was a six-game haul from February 6–16. Due to the shortened season and the compacted game scheduling, all games were to be played against the Ducks' own Western Conference opponents, and no games were played against Eastern Conference teams. The Ducks finished the season with a 30–12–6 record and won their second Pacific Division title in franchise history. In the Western Conference Quarterfinals, they lost to the seventh-seeded Detroit Red Wings in seven games, despite holding a 3–2 series lead after game five.

Entering the 2013–14 season, it was announced Teemu Selanne would be playing in his final NHL season. The Ducks made arguably the biggest move of the off-season when they traded star forward Bobby Ryan to the Ottawa Senators in exchange for forwards Jakob Silfverberg, Stefan Noesen and Ottawa's first-round pick in the 2014 NHL entry draft. The 2013–14 season marked the 20th anniversary of the franchise, and as such, all Ducks jerseys were embroidered with a commemorative patch. The 2013–14 season also marked the first time since the 1997–98 season that all NHL teams would play one another both home and away. Prior to the start of the season, it was announced Ducks defenceman Sheldon Souray would miss the entire season due to complications stemming from his off-season wrist surgery. To mitigate the loss, the Ducks signed free-agent defenceman Mark Fistric to a one-year, $900,000 contract. The Ducks also acquired center Mathieu Perreault from the Washington Capitals in exchange for minor-league forward John Mitchell and a fourth-round pick in 2014. In a move surprising many, former Stanley Cup-winning Duck and free agent Dustin Penner was brought back on a one-year contract, with the idea he would fill Bobby Ryan's spot on the Ducks' top-line alongside Ryan Getzlaf and Corey Perry and reunite the former "Kid Line" that was so successful during the 2006–07 season.

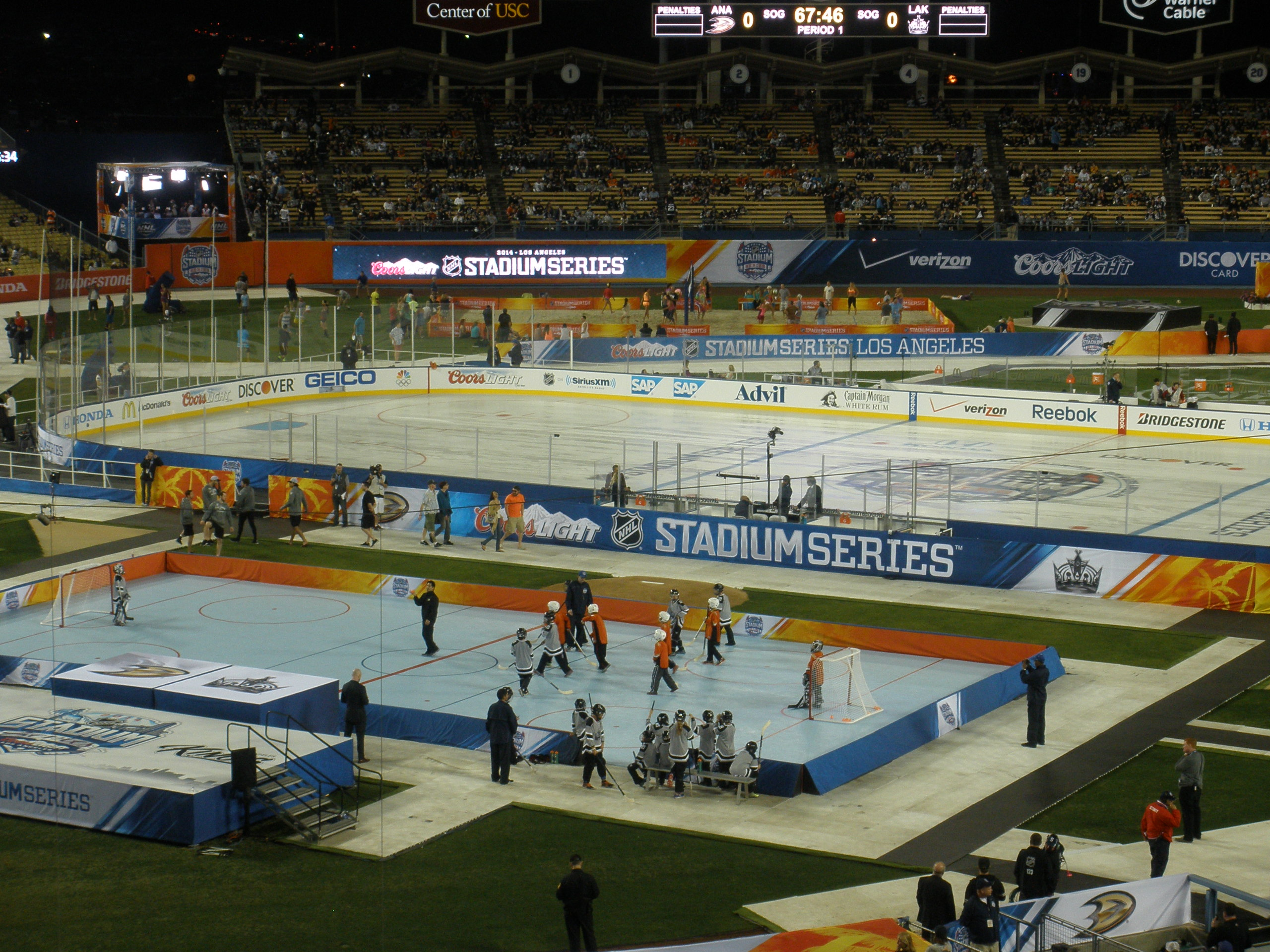
The Ducks participated in the 2014 Stadium Series, playing the Los Angeles Kings at Dodgers Stadium, January 2014.

The 2013–14 season was a record-setting one for the Ducks, but one which began with a 6–1 mauling at the hands of the Colorado Avalanche, which saw respective head coaches Bruce Boudreau and Patrick Roy almost come to blows at the game's conclusion. The Ducks responded with seven-straight wins, a run which was repeated and surpassed twice more during the season, including a franchise-record setting ten consecutive wins from December 6 to 28, 2013. At one point of the season, the Ducks won 18 of 19 games, the longest run of one-loss play in the NHL for 45 years. A 9–1 victory over the Vancouver Canucks on January 15 saw Anaheim establish a 20–0–2 record at the Honda Center, which matched the longest season-opening home points streak in 34 years, as well as setting a franchise-record for goals scored in a game (9) and powerplay goals scored in a game (6). Dustin Penner was eventually traded to the Washington Capitals, and prior to the NHL trade deadline, the Ducks acquired veteran defenseman Stephane Robidas from the Dallas Stars. Behind a Hart Trophy-caliber season from club captain Ryan Getzlaf, solid depth scoring, a steady if unspectacular defence and solid goaltending in the form of Jonas Hiller and rookie sensation Frederik Andersen, many felt the Ducks were primed to be a top contender for the Stanley Cup.

The Ducks remained towards the top of the NHL standings for the entire season, ending the regular season with a franchise-best 54–20–8 record (116 points) and eventually finishing one point behind the Boston Bruins in the race for the Presidents' Trophy, awarded to the team who finishes the regular season with the best record. The Ducks secured a second consecutive Pacific Division title and the number one seed in the Western Conference. Anaheim faced the eighth-seeded Dallas Stars in the Western Conference Quarterfinals, and were victorious in six games, marking the first time since 2009 the Ducks had won a playoff series. In the Western Conference Semifinals, the Ducks faced their geographic rival and eventual Stanley Cup champion Los Angeles Kings for the first time ever in the playoffs. In a hotly contested series, the Ducks ultimately went down in seven games to their rivals, losing game seven by a score of 6–2 at the Honda Center.

On May 19, 2014, the team announced a four-year contract extension for general manager Bob Murray to keep him under contract through to the 2019–20 season. Murray later won the NHL General Manager of the Year Award, while Ryan Getzlaf received his first-ever nominations for both the Hart Trophy and the Ted Lindsay Award, finishing as the unanimous runner-up to Pittsburgh captain Sidney Crosby.

On June 27, 2014, the Ducks acquired center Ryan Kesler (as well as a third-round pick in 2015) from the Vancouver Canucks in exchange for Nick Bonino, Luca Sbisa and a first- and third-round pick in 2014. In the following season, they won their third-straight Pacific Division title and finished as the top seed in the West with 109 points. In the 2015 playoffs, they swept the Winnipeg Jets in the first round. In Round 2, the Western Conference Semifinals, they extended a 19-game losing streak the Calgary Flames held at the Honda Center (presently at 22 games) by winning the first two games, but lost game three in Calgary in overtime. They then rallied together to win their next two games to win the series four games to one and to set up a Western Conference Final against the Chicago Blackhawks. After taking a three games to two series lead on the strong play of goaltender Frederik Andersen, the Ducks lost the final two games, including game seven on home ice. This marked the third straight season the Ducks had lost a series in game seven at home after leading the series three games to two. Andersen allowed four or more goals in each of the final four games of the series; the Ducks lost three of those four games and allowed 19 goals over that span. The Ducks scored three goals in a span of 37 seconds in game four of the series against the Blackhawks, the second fastest time in playoff history.

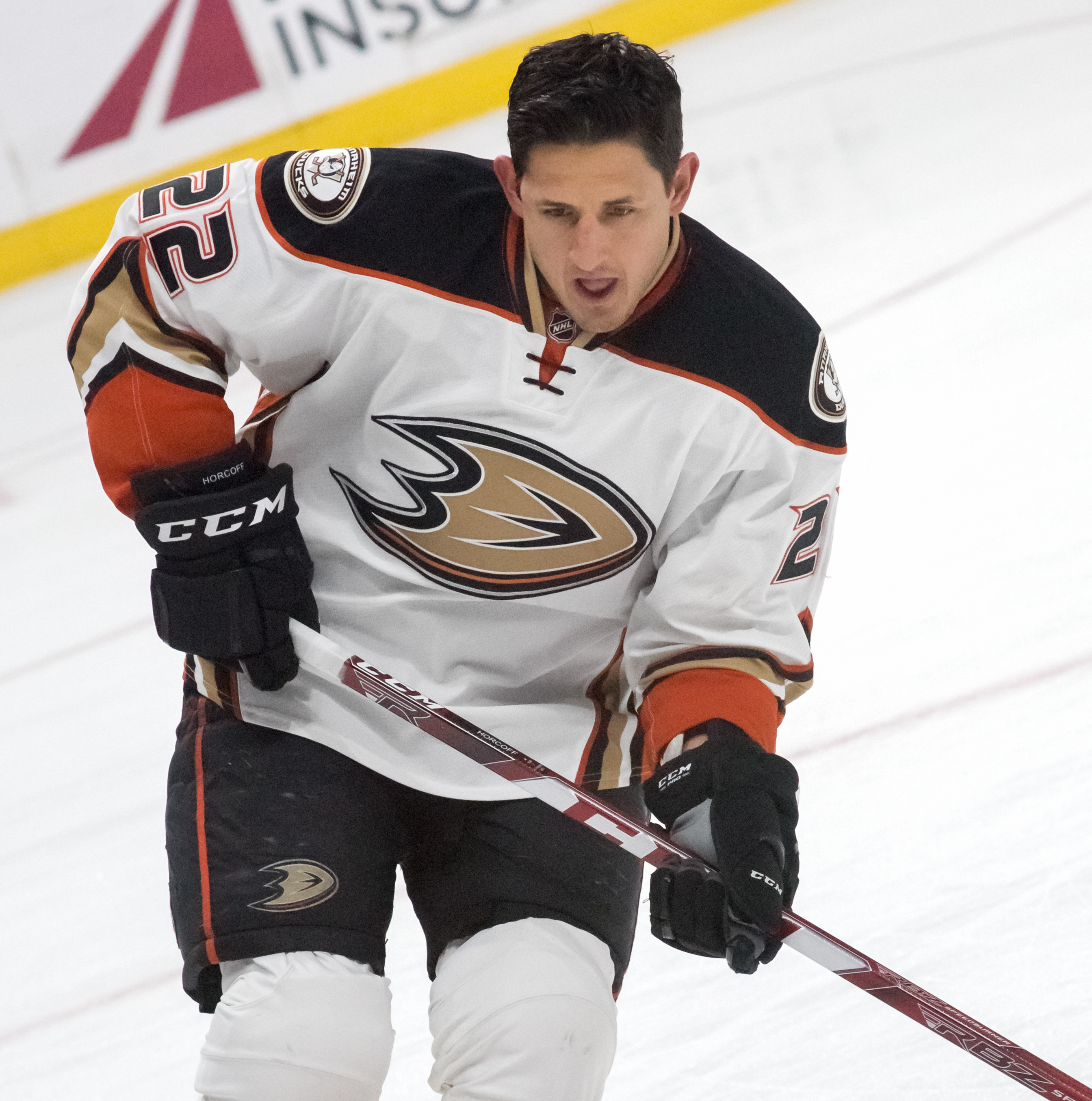
Shawn Horcoff signed with the Ducks during the 2015 off-season.

On July 15, 2015, the Ducks signed Ryan Kesler to a six-year contract extension totaling a reported $41.25 million. Just prior to the 2015 NHL entry draft, the Ducks sent Emerson Etem and a draft pick to the New York Rangers in exchange for speedy left-wing Carl Hagelin. They also traded for Vancouver Canucks defensemen Kevin Bieksa, whilst adding veterans Shawn Horcoff, Chris Stewart and Mike Santorelli. Entering the 2015–16 NHL season, many analysts pegged the Ducks as Stanley Cup favorites. However, scoring struggles led to a slow start, with the team still out of a playoff spot in December. The team improved afterwards riding the goaltending of John Gibson. On March 6, 2016, the Ducks set a franchise record with an 11-game winning streak which ended the following night. On March 24, 2016, the Ducks clinched a playoff spot in a 6–5 overtime loss to the Maple Leafs. However, in the first round of the playoffs, they fell in seven games to the Nashville Predators, which led to the firing of head coach Bruce Boudreau. On June 14, 2016, the Ducks announced they re-hired former head coach Randy Carlyle.

The Ducks finished first in the Pacific Division in 2017 and swept the wild-card Calgary Flames in the first round. On May 10, 2017, the Ducks ended their game seven losing streak when they defeated the Edmonton Oilers, winning the series 4–3 and advancing to the Western Conference finals for the second time in three seasons. They would fall to the Nashville Predators in game six, ending their playoff run. In the following season, the Ducks failed to win the Pacific Division for the first time since the 2011–12 season. They clinched the playoffs, but were swept by the San Jose Sharks in the First Round.

=== 2018–present ===
In 2019, the Ducks fired Carlyle and replaced him with Bob Murray as interim, however the Ducks missed the playoffs. On June 17, 2019, the team named Dallas Eakins as the franchise's tenth head coach.

On November 9, 2021, Murray was placed on administrative leave by the Ducks pending the results of an ongoing investigation. The investigation is reportedly focused on Murray's alleged history of verbal abuse to players and staff members. Assistant general manager Jeff Solomon was initially named as acting general manager but was then named interim general manager when Murray resigned on November 10. Pat Verbeek was named general manager on February 3, 2022. In 2023, Eakins left as head coach, and the team hired Greg Cronin as the next coach.
