= 2025–26 San Jose Sharks season =

NHL team season

2025–26 San Jose Sharks
- Division: 5th Pacific
- Conference: 11th Western
- 2025–26 record: 39–35–8
- Home record: 21–14–6
- Road record: 18–21–2
- Goals for: 251
- Goals against: 292

Team information
- General manager: Mike Grier
- Coach: Ryan Warsofsky
- Captain: Vacant
- Alternate captains: Macklin Celebrini; Mario Ferraro; Barclay Goodrow; Tyler Toffoli; Alexander Wennberg
- Arena: SAP Center
- Average attendance: 16,173
- Minor league affiliates: San Jose Barracuda (AHL); Wichita Thunder (ECHL)

Team leaders
- Goals: Macklin Celebrini (45)
- Assists: Macklin Celebrini (70)
- Points: Macklin Celebrini (115)
- Penalty minutes: Barclay Goodrow (73)
- Plus/minus: Macklin Celebrini (+8)
- Wins: Yaroslav Askarov (21)
- Goals against average: Alex Nedeljkovic (2.87)

The 2025–26 San Jose Sharks season was the 35th season for the National Hockey League (NHL) franchise that was established on May 9, 1990.

On April 13, 2026, the Sharks were eliminated from playoff contention for the seventh consecutive season following a win by the Los Angeles Kings against the Seattle Kraken. Nonetheless, the season marked an improvement over the previous year and was the Sharks’ best points-wise since the 2018–19 season, with the team remaining in playoff contention until the very end.

== Standings ==
=== Divisional standings ===
Pacific Division
Pos	Team	GP	W	L	OTL	RW	GF	GA	GD	Pts
1	y – Vegas Golden Knights	82	39	26	17	30	265	250	+15	95
2	x – Edmonton Oilers	82	41	30	11	32	282	269	+13	93
3	x – Anaheim Ducks	82	43	33	6	26	273	288	−15	92
4	x – Los Angeles Kings	82	35	27	20	22	225	247	−22	90
5	San Jose Sharks	82	39	35	8	27	251	292	−41	86
6	Seattle Kraken	82	34	37	11	26	226	263	−37	79
7	Calgary Flames	82	34	39	9	27	212	259	−47	77
8	Vancouver Canucks	82	25	49	8	15	216	316	−100	58

Source: National Hockey League
Rules for classification: 1) Fewer number of games played (GP, only during regular season); 2) Greater number of regulation wins (RW); 3) Greater number of wins in regulation and overtime, excluding shootout wins (ROW); 4) Greater number of total wins, including shootouts (W); 5) Greater number of points earned in head-to-head play; if teams played an uneven number of head-to-head games, the result of the first game on the home ice of the team with the extra home game is discarded; 6) Greater goal differential (GD); 7) Greater number of goals scored (GF)
x – Clinched playoff spot; y – Clinched division

=== Conference standings ===
Western Conference Wild Card
Pos	Div	Team	GP	W	L	OTL	RW	GF	GA	GD	Pts
1	CE	x – Utah Mammoth	82	43	33	6	33	268	240	+28	92
2	PA	x – Los Angeles Kings	82	35	27	20	22	225	247	−22	90
3	CE	St. Louis Blues	82	37	33	12	33	231	258	−27	86
4	CE	Nashville Predators	82	38	34	10	28	247	269	−22	86
5	PA	San Jose Sharks	82	39	35	8	27	251	292	−41	86
6	CE	Winnipeg Jets	82	35	35	12	28	231	260	−29	82
7	PA	Seattle Kraken	82	34	37	11	26	226	263	−37	79
8	PA	Calgary Flames	82	34	39	9	27	212	259	−47	77
9	CE	Chicago Blackhawks	82	29	39	14	22	213	275	−62	72
10	PA	Vancouver Canucks	82	25	49	8	15	216	316	−100	58

Source: National Hockey League
Rules for classification: 1) Fewer number of games played (GP, only during regular season); 2) Greater number of regulation wins (RW); 3) Greater number of wins in regulation and overtime, excluding shootout wins (ROW); 4) Greater number of total wins, including shootouts (W); 5) Greater number of points earned in head-to-head play; if teams played an uneven number of head-to-head games, the result of the first game on the home ice of the team with the extra home game is discarded; 6) Greater goal differential (GD); 7) Greater number of goals scored (GF)
x – Clinched playoff spot

== Schedule ==
=== Preseason ===
The preseason schedule was announced on June 20, 2025.

Preseason game log

2025 preseason game log: 2–4–0 (home: 1–2–0; away: 1–2–0)
#	Date	Visitor	Score	Home	OT	Decision	Attendance	Record	Recap
1	September 21	Vegas	0–3	San Jose		Nedeljkovic	11,613	1–0–0	Recap
2	September 26	Vegas	2–1	San Jose		Askarov	11,143	1–1–0	Recap
3	September 29	San Jose	2–3	Anaheim		Skarek	11,777	1–2–0	Recap
4	October 1	Anaheim	5–2	San Jose		Askarov	10,487	1–3–0	Recap
5	October 3	San Jose	4–1	Vegas		Nedeljkovic	17,488	2–3–0	Recap
6	October 4	San Jose	4–6	Utah		Askarov	12,478	2–4–0	Recap

Legend: Win Loss Overtime/shootout loss

=== Regular season ===
The schedule was announced on July 16, 2025.

2025–26 game log: 39–35–8 (home: 21–14–6; away: 18–21–2)

October: 3–6–2 (home: 1–3–2; away: 2–3–0)
#	Date	Visitor	Score	Home	OT	Decision	Attendance	Record	Pts	Recap
1	October 9	Vegas	4–3	San Jose	OT	Nedeljkovic	17,435	0–0–1	1	Recap
2	October 11	Anaheim	7–6	San Jose	OT	Askarov	17,435	0–0–2	2	Recap
3	October 14	Carolina	5–1	San Jose		Nedeljkovic	12,786	0–1–2	2	Recap
4	October 17	San Jose	3–6	Utah		Askarov	12,478	0–2–2	2	Recap
5	October 18	Pittsburgh	3–0	San Jose		Nedeljkovic	17,435	0–3–2	2	Recap
6	October 21	San Jose	3–4	NY Islanders		Askarov	15,832	0–4–2	2	Recap
7	October 23	San Jose	6–5	NY Rangers	OT	Nedeljkovic	18,006	1–4–2	4	Recap
8	October 24	San Jose	1–3	New Jersey		Askarov	16,514	1–5–2	4	Recap
9	October 26	San Jose	6–5	Minnesota	OT	Askarov	17,101	2–5–2	6	Recap
10	October 28	Los Angeles	4–3	San Jose		Askarov	12,804	2–6–2	6	Recap
11	October 30	New Jersey	2–5	San Jose		Nedeljkovic	12,390	3–6–2	8	Recap

November: 9–5–1 (home: 7–0–1; away: 2–5–0)
#	Date	Visitor	Score	Home	OT	Decision	Attendance	Record	Pts	Recap
12	November 1	Colorado	2–3	San Jose	OT	Askarov	16,406	4–6–2	10	Recap
13	November 2	Detroit	3–2	San Jose	SO	Nedeljkovic	14,876	4–6–3	11	Recap
14	November 5	San Jose	6–1	Seattle		Askarov	17,151	5–6–3	13	Recap
15	November 7	Winnipeg	1–2	San Jose		Nedeljkovic	13,053	6–6–3	15	Recap
16	November 8	Florida	1–3	San Jose		Askarov	15,895	7–6–3	17	Recap
17	November 11	San Jose	2–1	Minnesota	OT	Askarov	16,253	8–6–3	19	Recap
18	November 13	San Jose	0–2	Calgary		Askarov	17,551	8–7–3	19	Recap
19	November 15	San Jose	1–4	Seattle		Nedeljkovic	17,151	8–8–3	19	Recap
20	November 18	Utah	2–3	San Jose	OT	Askarov	12,101	9–8–3	21	Recap
21	November 20	Los Angeles	3–4	San Jose	SO	Askarov	16,387	10–8–3	23	Recap
22	November 22	Ottawa	3–2	San Jose		Nedeljkovic	17,435	10–9–3	23	Recap
23	November 23	Boston	3–1	San Jose		Askarov	17,435	11–9–3	25	Recap
24	November 26	San Jose	0–6	Colorado		Askarov	18,117	11–10–3	25	Recap
25	November 28	Vancouver	2–3	San Jose		Askarov	17,435	12–10–3	27	Recap
26	November 29	San Jose	3–4	Vegas		Nedeljkovic	17,919	12–11–3	27	Recap

December: 8–6–0 (home: 3–3–0; away: 5–3–0)
#	Date	Visitor	Score	Home	OT	Decision	Attendance	Record	Pts	Recap
27	December 1	Utah	3–6	San Jose		Askarov	11,241	13–11–3	29	Recap
28	December 3	Washington	7–1	San Jose		Askarov	15,466	13–12–3	29	Recap
29	December 5	San Jose	1–4	Dallas		Askarov	18,532	13–13–3	29	Recap
30	December 7	San Jose	4–1	Carolina		Nedeljkovic	18,299	14–13–3	31	Recap
31	December 9	San Jose	1–4	Philadelphia		Nedeljkovic	17,497	14–14–3	31	Recap
32	December 11	San Jose	3–2	Toronto	OT	Nedeljkovic	18,674	15–14–3	33	Recap
33	December 13	San Jose	6–5	Pittsburgh	OT	Askarov	17,059	16–14–3	35	Recap
34	December 16	Calgary	3–6	San Jose		Askarov	14,261	17–14–3	37	Recap
35	December 18	Dallas	5–3	San Jose		Nedelijkovic	15,808	17–15–3	37	Recap
36	December 20	Seattle	4–2	San Jose		Askarov	17,435	17–16–3	37	Recap
37	December 23	San Jose	2–7	Vegas		Askarov	18,092	17–17–3	37	Recap
38	December 27	San Jose	6–3	Vancouver		Askarov	18,992	18–17–3	39	Recap
39	December 29	San Jose	5–4	Anaheim		Askarov	16,214	19–17–3	41	Recap
40	December 31	Minnesota	3–4	San Jose	SO	Askarov	17,435	20–17–3	43	Recap

January: 7–5–1 (home: 3–2–0; away: 4–3–1)
#	Date	Visitor	Score	Home	OT	Decision	Attendance	Record	Pts	Recap
41	January 3	Tampa Bay	7–3	San Jose		Nedeljkovic	17,435	20–18–3	43	Recap
42	January 6	Columbus	2–5	San Jose		Nedeljkovic	16,258	21–18–3	45	Recap
43	January 7	San Jose	4–3	Los Angeles	OT	Askarov	17,473	22–18–3	47	Recap
44	January 10	Dallas	4–5	San Jose	OT	Nedeljkovic	17,435	23–18–3	49	Recap
45	January 11	Vegas	7–2	San Jose		Askarov	17,435	23–19–3	49	Recap
46	January 15	San Jose	3–2	Washington		Nedeljkovic	18,347	24–19–3	51	Recap
47	January 16	San Jose	2–4	Detroit		Askarov	19,515	24–20–3	51	Recap
48	January 19	San Jose	4–1	Florida		Nedeljkovic	19,191	25–20–3	53	Recap
49	January 20	San Jose	1–4	Tampa Bay		Askarov	19,092	25–21–3	53	Recap
50	January 23	NY Rangers	1–3	San Jose		Nedeljkovic	17,435	26–21–3	55	Recap
51	January 27	San Jose	5–2	Vancouver		Askarov	18,964	27–21–3	57	Recap
52	January 29	San Jose	3–4	Edmonton	OT	Askarov	18,347	27–21–4	58	Recap
53	January 31	San Jose	2–3	Calgary		Nedeljkovic	18,490	27–22–4	58	Recap

February: 1–3–0 (home: 1–1–0; away: 0–2–0)
#	Date	Visitor	Score	Home	OT	Decision	Attendance	Record	Pts	Recap
54	February 2	San Jose	3–6	Chicago		Askarov	20,130	27–23–4	58	Recap
55	February 4	San Jose	2–4	Colorado		Askarov	18,136	27–24–4	58	Recap
56	February 26	Calgary	4–1	San Jose		Askarov	17,435	27–25–4	58	Recap
57	February 28	Edmonton	4–5	San Jose		Askarov	17,435	28–25–4	60	Recap

March: 6–6–3 (home: 3–2–2; away: 3–4–1)
#	Date	Visitor	Score	Home	OT	Decision	Attendance	Record	Pts	Recap
58	March 1	Winnipeg	1–2	San Jose	OT	Nedeljkovic	17,435	29–25–4	62	Recap
59	March 3	Montreal	5–7	San Jose		Askarov	17,435	30–25–4	64	Recap
60	March 6	St. Louis	3–2	San Jose	OT	Nedeljkovic	17,435	30–25–5	65	Recap
61	March 7	NY Islanders	2–1	San Jose	OT	Askarov	17,435	30–25–6	66	Recap
62	March 10	San Jose	3–6	Buffalo		Askarov	19,070	30–26–6	66	Recap
63	March 12	San Jose	4–2	Boston		Nedeljkovic	17,850	31–26–6	68	Recap
64	March 14	San Jose	4–2	Montreal		Nedeljkovic	20,962	32–26–6	70	Recap
65	March 15	San Jose	4–7	Ottawa		Brossoit	18,764	32–27–6	70	Recap
66	March 17	San Jose	3–5	Edmonton		Nedeljkovic	18,347	32–28–6	70	Recap
67	March 19	Buffalo	5–0	San Jose		Nedeljkovic	17,435	32–29–6	70	Recap
68	March 21	Philadelphia	4–1	San Jose		Nedeljkovic	17,435	32–30–6	70	Recap
69	March 24	San Jose	3–6	Nashville		Nedeljkovic	17,159	32–31–6	70	Recap
70	March 26	San Jose	1–2	St. Louis	OT	Nedeljkovic	18,096	32–31–7	71	Recap
71	March 28	San Jose	3–2	Columbus		Nedelijkovic	18,874	33–31–7	73	Recap
72	March 30	St. Louis	4–5	San Jose		Askarov	16,031	34–31–7	75	Recap

April: 5–4–1 (home: 3–2–1; away: 2–2–0)
#	Date	Visitor	Score	Home	OT	Decision	Attendance	Record	Pts	Recap
73	April 1	Anaheim	3–4	San Jose		Askarov	16,146	35–31–7	77	Recap
74	April 2	Toronto	1–4	San Jose		Nedeljkovic	15,180	36–31–7	79	Recap
75	April 4	Nashville	6–3	San Jose		Askarov	17,435	36–32–7	79	Recap
76	April 6	Chicago	2–3	San Jose		Nedeljkovic	16,204	37–32–7	81	Recap
77	April 8	Edmonton	5–2	San Jose		Nedeljkovic	15,683	37–33–7	81	Recap
78	April 9	San Jose	1–6	Anaheim		Askarov	16,628	37–34–7	81	Recap
79	April 11	Vancouver	4–3	San Jose	SO	Askarov	17,435	37–34–8	82	Recap
80	April 13	San Jose	3–2	Nashville		Nedeljkovic	17,388	38–34–8	84	Recap
81	April 15	San Jose	2–5	Chicago		Askarov	20,397	38–35–8	84	Recap
82	April 16	San Jose	6–1	Winnipeg		Nedeljkovic	15,225	39–35–8	86	Recap

Legend: Win Loss Overtime/shootout loss

== Player statistics ==
Updated to games played April 16, 2026

=== Skaters ===
Regular season
Player	GP	G	A	Pts	+/-	PIM
Macklin Celebrini	82	45	70	115	+8	44
Will Smith	69	24	35	59	+1	16
Alexander Wennberg	80	18	37	55	−25	18
William Eklund	78	15	38	53	−31	32
Tyler Toffoli	79	19	30	49	−12	10
Collin Graf	81	21	25	46	+6	12
Dmitry Orlov	82	3	34	37	−28	48
John Klingberg	56	10	17	27	−13	24
Adam Gaudette	66	17	8	25	−9	20
Mario Ferraro	82	7	16	23	−1	35
Michael Misa	45	9	12	21	−2	10
Philipp Kurashev	43	7	13	20	+1	16
Igor Chernyshov	28	9	10	19	+2	6
Sam Dickinson	72	1	13	14	−5	22
Jeff Skinner^{‡}	32	6	7	13	−8	14
Kiefer Sherwood^{†}	27	6	7	13	−8	28
Shakir Mukhamadullin	50	5	7	12	−3	22
Barclay Goodrow	82	5	7	12	−18	73
Ty Dellandrea	46	2	9	11	−18	22
Timothy Liljegren^{‡}	43	1	10	11	−7	27
Pavol Regenda	24	9	1	10	−4	20
Zack Ostapchuk	59	4	3	7	−11	45
Nick Leddy	32	1	6	7	−9	6
Vincent Desharnais	53	1	6	7	+7	68
Ryan Reaves	50	3	0	3	−12	37
Vincent Iorio^{‡}	21	0	3	3	−4	12
Ethan Cardwell	7	1	0	1	−3	2
Patrick Giles	3	0	1	1	+1	0
Luca Cagnoni	3	0	0	0	0	2

=== Goaltenders ===
Regular season
Player	GP	GS	TOI	W	L	OT	GA	GAA	SA	SV%	SO	G	A	Pts	PIM
Yaroslav Askarov	47	47	2596:29	21	20	4	157	3.63	1341	.884	0	0	0	0	2
Alex Nedeljkovic	40	34	2277:58	18	14	4	109	2.87	1048	.896	0	0	1	1	9
Laurent Brossoit	1	1	59:09	0	1	0	6	6.09	23	.783	0	0	0	0	0

^{†}Denotes player spent time with another team before joining the Sharks. Stats reflect time with the Sharks only.
^{‡}Denotes player was traded mid-season. Stats reflect time with the Sharks only.
Bold/italics denotes franchise record.

== Transactions ==
The Sharks have been involved in the following transactions during the 2025–26 season.

Key:

† Contract is entry-level.
‡ Contract initially takes effect in the 2026–27 season.

=== Trades ===
Date	Details		Ref
July 1, 2025	To Pittsburgh Penguins 3rd-round pick in 2028	To San Jose Sharks Alex Nedeljkovic	
July 2, 2025	To New Jersey Devils Thomas Bordeleau	To San Jose Sharks Shane Bowers	
July 10, 2025	To Toronto Maple Leafs Henry Thrun	To San Jose Sharks Ryan Reaves	
July 25, 2025	To Colorado Avalanche Danil Gushchin	To San Jose Sharks Oskar Olausson	
September 5, 2025	To Montreal Canadiens Gannon Laroque	To San Jose Sharks Carey Price; 5th-round pick in 2026	
October 5, 2025	To Philadelphia Flyers Carl Grundstrom; Artem Guryev	To San Jose Sharks Ryan Ellis conditional 6th-round pick in 2026	
October 17, 2025	To Minnesota Wild Oskar Olausson	To San Jose Sharks Kyle Masters	
January 8, 2026	To Chicago Blackhawks Ryan Ellis; Jake Furlong; 4th-round pick in 2028	To San Jose Sharks Laurent Brossoit; Nolan Allan; 7th-round pick in 2028	
January 16, 2026	To Carolina Hurricanes Kyle Masters; 4th-round pick in 2026	To San Jose Sharks 5th-round pick in 2027	
January 19, 2026	To Vancouver Canucks Cole Clayton; 2nd-round pick in 2026; 2nd-round pick in 2027	To San Jose Sharks Kiefer Sherwood	
March 5, 2026	To Vancouver Canucks Jack Thompson	To San Jose Sharks Jett Woo	
March 6, 2026	To Washington Capitals Timothy Liljegren	To San Jose Sharks 4th-round pick in 2026	
June 17, 2026	To Buffalo Sabres 1st-round pick in 2026	To San Jose Sharks Michael Kesselring; 1st-round pick in 2026	
June 18, 2026	To Boston Bruins 4th-round pick in 2026; 5th-round pick in 2026	To San Jose Sharks Andre Gasseau; 4th-round pick in 2026	
June 23, 2026	To Ottawa Senators William Eklund; Kasper Halttunen; Brandon Svoboda	To San Jose Sharks 1st-round pick in 2026	

=== Players acquired ===
Date	Player	Former team	Term	Via	Ref
July 1, 2025	Adam Gaudette	Ottawa Senators	2-year	Free agency	
July 1, 2025	John Klingberg	Edmonton Oilers	1-year	Free agency	
July 1, 2025	Philipp Kurashev	Chicago Blackhawks	1-year	Free agency	
July 2, 2025	Jimmy Huntington	Wilkes-Barre/Scranton Penguins (AHL)	1-year	Free agency	
July 2, 2025	Samuel Laberge	Utica Comets (AHL)	1-year	Free agency	
July 2, 2025	Cole Clayton	Cleveland Monsters (AHL)	1-year	Free agency	
July 3, 2025	Nick Leddy	St. Louis Blues		Waivers	
July 3, 2025	Dmitry Orlov	Carolina Hurricanes	2-year	Free agency	
July 10, 2025	Jakub Skarek	New York Islanders	1-year	Free agency	
July 11, 2025	Jeff Skinner	Edmonton Oilers	1-year	Free agency	
October 16, 2025	Vincent Iorio	Washington Capitals		Waiver	

=== Players lost ===
Date	Player	New team	Term	Via	Ref
June 26, 2025	Marc-Edouard Vlasic			Bought out	
July 2, 2025	Walker Duehr	Winnipeg Jets	1-year	Free agency	
July 2, 2025	Jimmy Schuldt	Vancouver Canucks	2-year	Free agency	
July 13, 2025	Scott Sabourin	Tampa Bay Lightning	1-year	Free agency	
July 13, 2025	Nikolai Kovalenko	CSKA Moscow (KHL)	2-year	Free agency	
August 25, 2025	Jan Rutta	Genève-Servette HC (NL)	2-year	Free agency	
September 12, 2025	Alexandar Georgiev	Buffalo Sabres	1-year	Free agency	
October 7, 2025	Noah Gregor	Florida Panthers	1-year	Free agency	
October 8, 2025	Georgi Romanov	St. Louis Blues	1-year	Free agency	
November 3, 2025	Klim Kostin	Avangard Omsk (KHL)	1-year	Free agency	
January 31, 2026	Vincent Iorio	New York Rangers		Waivers	
February 16, 2026	Jeff Skinner			Waivers	

=== Signings ===
Date	Player	Term	Ref
June 29, 2025	Gabriel Carriere	1-year	
July 1, 2025	William Eklund	3-year	
July 1, 2025	Colin White	1-year	
July 2, 2025	Pavol Regenda	1-year	
July 14, 2025	Jack Thompson	1-year	
September 10, 2025	Michael Misa	3-year†	
January 4, 2026	Alexander Wennberg	3-year	
March 4, 2026	Kiefer Sherwood	5-year‡	
March 6, 2026	Alex Nedeljkovic	2-year‡	
March 13, 2026	Ty Dellandrea	2-year‡	
April 16, 2026	Eric Pohlkamp	2-year†	
May 5, 2026	Patrick Giles	2-year	
May 13, 2026	Carson Wetsch	3-year‡†	
May 27, 2026	Jimmy Huntington	1-year‡†	
May 28, 2026	Phillip Sinn	2-year‡†	
June 23, 2026	Nolan Allan	2-year	
June 25, 2026	Ethan Cardwell	1-year	

== Draft picks ==
Below are the San Jose Sharks' selections at the 2025 NHL entry draft, which was held on June 27 and 28, 2025, at the Peacock Theater in Los Angeles, California.

Round	#	Player	Pos	Nationality	College/Junior/Club (League)
1	2	Michael Misa	C	Canada	Saginaw Spirit (OHL)
1	30 (Note: The Dallas Stars' first-round pick went to the San Jose Sharks as the result of a trade on February 1, 2025, that sent Cody Ceci and Mikael Granlund to Dallas in exchange for a conditional third-round pick in 2025 and this pick.)	Joshua Ravensbergen	G	Canada	Prince George Cougars (WHL)
2	33	Haoxi Wang	D	China	Oshawa Generals (OHL)
2	53 (Note: The Ottawa Senators' second-round pick went to San Jose as the result of a trade on March 7, 2025, that sent Tristen Robins, Fabian Zetterlund and a fourth-round pick in 2025 to Ottawa in exchange for Noah Gregor, Zack Ostapchuk and this pick.)	Cole McKinney	C	United States	U.S. NTDP (USHL)
3	95 (Note: The Edmonton Oilers' third-round pick went to San Jose as the result of a trade on August 18, 2024, that sent Ty Emberson to Edmonton in exchange for Cody Ceci and this pick.)	Teddy Mutryn	C	United States	Chicago Steel (USHL)
4	115 (Note: The St. Louis Blues' fourth-round pick went to San Jose as the result of a trade on March 7, 2025, that sent Luke Kunin to Columbus in exchange for this pick.)	Ilyas Magomedsultanov	D	Russia	Lokomotiv Yaroslavl Jr. (JHL)
4	124 (Note: The Winnipeg Jets' fourth-round pick went to San Jose as the result of a trade on February 1, 2025, that sent Cody Ceci and Mikael Granlund to Dallas in exchange for a first-round pick in 2025 and this pick (being conditional at the time of the trade). The condition – San Jose will receive Winnipeg's fourth-round pick in 2025 if Dallas fails to qualify for the 2025 Stanley Cup Final – was converted when Dallas was eliminated from the 2025 Stanley Cup playoffs on May 29, 2025.)	Zachary Sharp	D	United States	Western Michigan Broncos (NCHC)
5	150 (Note: The Colorado Avalanche's fifth-round pick went to San Jose as the result of a trade on December 9, 2024, that sent Mackenzie Blackwood, Givani Smith and a fifth-round pick in 2027 to Colorado in exchange for Alexandar Georgiev, Nikolai Kovalenko, a second-round pick in 2026 and this pick.)	Max Heise	C	Canada	Penticton Vees (BCHL)
7	210 (Note: The New Jersey Devils' seventh-round pick went to San Jose as the result of a trade on March 8, 2024, that sent Kaapo Kahkonen to New Jersey in exchange for Vitek Vanecek and this pick.)	Richard Gallant	C	United States	U.S. NTDP (USHL)

== Awards ==
Regular season
Player	Award	Awarded
Macklin Celebrini	First Star of the Week; Third Star of the Week; Third Star of the Month	October 26, 2025; November 23, 2025; December 2025
Philipp Kurashev	Third Star of the Week	November 2, 2025
