= 2025–26 New York Rangers season =

National Hockey League season

2025–26 New York Rangers
- Division: 8th Metropolitan
- Conference: 16th Eastern
- 2025–26 record: 34–39–9
- Home record: 14–20–7
- Road record: 20–19–2
- Goals for: 238
- Goals against: 250

Team information
- General manager: Chris Drury
- Coach: Mike Sullivan
- Captain: J. T. Miller
- Alternate captains: Adam Fox; Artemi Panarin (Oct. 7 – Feb. 4); Vincent Trocheck; Mika Zibanejad
- Arena: Madison Square Garden
- Minor league affiliates: Hartford Wolf Pack (AHL); Bloomington Bison (ECHL)

Team leaders
- Goals: Mika Zibanejad (34)
- Assists: Mika Zibanejad (44); Adam Fox (44)
- Points: Mika Zibanejad (78)
- Penalty minutes: Will Cuylle (65)
- Plus/minus: Taylor Raddysh (+5); Adam Fox (+5)
- Wins: Igor Shesterkin (25)
- Goals against average: Igor Shesterkin (2.50); Dylan Garand (1.62)

The Rangers' 100th anniversary logo

The 2025–26 New York Rangers season was the franchise's 99th season of play and their 100th overall season. This was the first season under head coach Mike Sullivan.

On March 25, 2026, the Rangers were eliminated from playoff contention for the second consecutive season for the first time since the 2017–18 season and the 2018–19 season after a 4–3 loss to the Toronto Maple Leafs.

== Standings ==
=== Divisional standings ===
Metropolitan Division
Pos	Team	GP	W	L	OTL	RW	GF	GA	GD	Pts
1	z – Carolina Hurricanes	82	53	22	7	39	296	240	+56	113
2	x – Pittsburgh Penguins	82	41	25	16	34	293	268	+25	98
3	x – Philadelphia Flyers	82	43	27	12	27	250	243	+7	98
4	Washington Capitals	82	43	30	9	37	263	244	+19	95
5	Columbus Blue Jackets	82	40	30	12	28	253	253	0	92
6	New York Islanders	82	43	34	5	29	233	241	−8	91
7	New Jersey Devils	82	42	37	3	29	230	254	−24	87
8	New York Rangers	82	34	39	9	25	238	250	−12	77

Source: National Hockey League
Rules for classification: 1) Fewer number of games played (GP, only during regular season); 2) Greater number of regulation wins (RW); 3) Greater number of wins in regulation and overtime, excluding shootout wins (ROW); 4) Greater number of total wins, including shootouts (W); 5) Greater number of points earned in head-to-head play; if teams played an uneven number of head-to-head games, the result of the first game on the home ice of the team with the extra home game is discarded; 6) Greater goal differential (GD); 7) Greater number of goals scored (GF)
x – Clinched playoff spot; z – Clinched conference

=== Conference standings ===
Eastern Conference Wild Card
Pos	Div	Team	GP	W	L	OTL	RW	GF	GA	GD	Pts
1	AT	x – Boston Bruins	82	45	27	10	33	272	250	+22	100
2	AT	x – Ottawa Senators	82	44	27	11	38	278	246	+32	99
3	ME	Washington Capitals	82	43	30	9	37	263	244	+19	95
4	AT	Detroit Red Wings	82	41	31	10	30	241	258	−17	92
5	ME	Columbus Blue Jackets	82	40	30	12	28	253	253	0	92
6	ME	New York Islanders	82	43	34	5	29	233	241	−8	91
7	ME	New Jersey Devils	82	42	37	3	29	230	254	−24	87
8	AT	Florida Panthers	82	40	38	4	32	251	276	−25	84
9	AT	Toronto Maple Leafs	82	32	36	14	23	253	299	−46	78
10	ME	New York Rangers	82	34	39	9	25	238	250	−12	77

Source: National Hockey League
Rules for classification: 1) Fewer number of games played (GP, only during regular season); 2) Greater number of regulation wins (RW); 3) Greater number of wins in regulation and overtime, excluding shootout wins (ROW); 4) Greater number of total wins, including shootouts (W); 5) Greater number of points earned in head-to-head play; if teams played an uneven number of head-to-head games, the result of the first game on the home ice of the team with the extra home game is discarded; 6) Greater goal differential (GD); 7) Greater number of goals scored (GF)
x – Clinched playoff spot

== Schedule and results ==
=== Preseason ===
The preseason schedule was published on June 24, 2025.

2025 preseason game log: 2–3–1 (home: 0–3–1; road: 2–1–0)

Game	Date	Opponent	Score	OT	Decision	Location	Attendance	Record
1	September 21	@ New Jersey	5–3		Garand	Prudential Center	13,309	1–0–0
2	September 23	Boston	4–5	OT	Boyko	Madison Square Garden	16,149	1–0–1
3	September 25	NY Islanders	4–5		Garand	Madison Square Garden	17,246	1–1–1
4	September 29	@ NY Islanders	3–2	OT	Garand	UBS Arena	12,877	2–1–1
5	October 2	New Jersey	1–3		Quick	Madison Square Garden	17,049	2–2–1
6	October 4	@ Boston	1–4		Shesterkin	TD Garden	17,850	2–3–1

=== Regular season ===
The regular season schedule was published on July 16, 2025.

2025–26 game log
October: 5–5–2, 12 points (home: 0–4–1; road: 5–1–1)

Game	Date	Opponent	Score	OT	Decision	Location	Attendance	Record	Points	Recap
1	October 7	Pittsburgh	0–3		Shesterkin	Madison Square Garden	18,006	0–1–0	0	
2	October 9	@ Buffalo	4–0		Shesterkin	KeyBank Center	19,070	1–1–0	2	
3	October 11	@ Pittsburgh	6–1		Shesterkin	PPG Paints Arena	16,716	2–1–0	4	
4	October 12	Washington	0–1		Quick	Madison Square Garden	17,479	2–2–0	4	
5	October 14	Edmonton	0–2		Shesterkin	Madison Square Garden	16,497	2–3–0	4	
6	October 16	@ Toronto	1–2	OT	Shesterkin	Scotiabank Arena	18,267	2–3–1	5	
7	October 18	@ Montreal	4–3		Quick	Bell Centre	20,962	3–3–1	7	
8	October 20	Minnesota	1–3		Shesterkin	Madison Square Garden	18,006	3–4–1	7	
9	October 23	San Jose	5–6	OT	Shesterkin	Madison Square Garden	18,006	3–4–2	8	
10	October 26	@ Calgary	1–5		Shesterkin	Scotiabank Saddledome	17,196	3–5–2	8	
11	October 28	@ Vancouver	2–0		Quick	Rogers Arena	18,919	4–5–2	10	
12	October 30	@ Edmonton	4–3	OT	Shesterkin	Rogers Place	17.787	5–5–2	12	

November: 8–7–0, 16 points (home: 2–4–0; road: 6–3–0)

Game	Date	Opponent	Score	OT	Decision	Location	Attendance	Record	Points	Recap
13	November 1	@ Seattle	3–2	OT	Shesterkin	Climate Pledge Arena	17,151	6–5–2	14	
14	November 4	Carolina	0–3		Shesterkin	Madison Square Garden	17,147	6–6–2	14	
15	November 7	@ Detroit	4–1		Quick	Little Caesars Arena	19,515	7–6–2	16	
16	November 8	NY Islanders	0–5		Shesterkin	Madison Square Garden	18,006	7–7–2	16	
17	November 10	Nashville	6–3		Shesterkin	Madison Square Garden	18,006	8–7–2	18	
18	November 12	@ Tampa Bay	7–3		Shesterkin	Benchmark International Arena	19,092	9–7–2	20	
19	November 15	@ Columbus	2–1	SO	Shesterkin	Nationwide Arena	16,298	10–7–2	22	
20	November 16	Detroit	1–2		Quick	Madison Square Garden	18,006	10–8–2	22	
21	November 18	@ Vegas	2–3		Shesterkin	T-Mobile Arena	18,008	10–9–2	22	
22	November 20	@ Colorado	3–6		Shesterkin	Ball Arena	18,080	10–10–2	22	
23	November 22	@ Utah	2–3		Quick	Delta Center	12,478	10–11–2	22	
24	November 24	St. Louis	3–2		Shesterkin	Madison Square Garden	18,006	11–11–2	24	
25	November 26	@ Carolina	4–2		Shesterkin	Lenovo Center	18,299	12–11–2	26	
26	November 28	@ Boston	6–2		Shesterkin	TD Garden	17,850	13–11–2	28	
27	November 29	Tampa Bay	1–4		Shesterkin	Madison Square Garden	18,006	13–12–2	28	

December: 6–6–3, 14 points (home: 3–2–2; road: 3–4–1)

Game	Date	Opponent	Score	OT	Decision	Location	Attendance	Record	Points	Recap
28	December 2	Dallas	3–2	OT	Shesterkin	Madison Square Garden	16,950	14–12–2	30	
29	December 4	@ Ottawa	4–2		Shesterkin	Canadian Tire Centre	15,533	15–12–2	32	
30	December 6	Colorado	2–3	OT	Shesterkin	Madison Square Garden	17,647	15–12–3	33	
31	December 7	Vegas	2–3	OT	Quick	Madison Square Garden	17,486	15–12–4	34	
32	December 10	@ Chicago	0–3		Shesterkin	United Center	19,709	15–13–4	34	
33	December 13	Montreal	5–4	OT	Shesterkin	Madison Square Garden	18,006	16–13–4	36	
34	December 15	Anaheim	1–4		Shesterkin	Madison Square Garden	18,006	16–14–4	36	
35	December 16	Vancouver	0–3		Quick	Madison Square Garden	17,452	16–15–4	36	
36	December 18	@ St. Louis	2–1	OT	Shesterkin	Enterprise Center	18,096	17–15–4	38	
37	December 20	Philadelphia	5–4	SO	Shesterkin	Madison Square Garden	18,006	18–15–4	40	
38	December 21	@ Nashville	1–2		Quick	Bridgestone Arena	17,159	18–16–4	40	
39	December 23	@ Washington	7–3		Shesterkin	Capital One Arena	18,347	19–16–4	42	
40	December 27	@ NY Islanders	0–2		Shesterkin	UBS Arena	17,255	19–17–4	42	
41	December 29	@ Carolina	2–3	OT	Shesterkin	Lenovo Center	18,309	19–17–5	43	
42	December 31	@ Washington	3–6		Quick	Capital One Arena	18,347	19–18–5	43	

January: 3–10–1, 7 points (home: 1–4–1; road: 2–6–0)

Game	Date	Opponent	Score	OT	Decision	Location	Attendance	Record	Points	Recap
43	January 2	@ Florida	5–1		Shesterkin	LoanDepot Park	36,153 (outdoors)	20–18–5	45	
44	January 5	Utah	2–3	OT	Quick	Madison Square Garden	17,503	20–18–6	46	
45	January 8	Buffalo	2–5		Quick	Madison Square Garden	18,006	20–19–6	46	
46	January 10	@ Boston	2–10		Quick	TD Garden	17,850	20–20–6	46	
47	January 12	Seattle	2–4		Quick	Madison Square Garden	18,006	20–21–6	46	
48	January 14	Ottawa	4–8		Quick	Madison Square Garden	17,776	20–22–6	46	
49	January 17	@ Philadelphia	6–3		Martin	Xfinity Mobile Arena	19,669	21–22–6	48	
50	January 19	@ Anaheim	3–5		Martin	Honda Center	16,214	21–23–6	48	
51	January 20	@ Los Angeles	3–4		Quick	Crypto.com Arena	18,145	21–24–6	48	
52	January 23	@ San Jose	1–3		Martin	SAP Center	17,435	21–25–6	48	
53	January 26	Boston	4–3	OT	Quick	Madison Square Garden	17,469	22–25–6	50	
54	January 28	@ NY Islanders	2–5		Martin	UBS Arena	17,255	22–26–6	50	
55	January 29	NY Islanders	1–2		Quick	Madison Square Garden	18,006	22–27–6	50	
56	January 31	@ Pittsburgh	5–6		Quick	PPG Paints Arena	18,370	22–28–6	50	

February: 1–1–1, 3 points (home: 1–1–1; road: 0–0–0)

Game	Date	Opponent	Score	OT	Decision	Location	Attendance	Record	Points	Recap
57	February 5	Carolina	0–2		Quick	Madison Square Garden	17,288	22–29–6	50	
58	February 26	Philadelphia	2–3	OT	Shesterkin	Madison Square Garden	16,867	22–29–7	51	
59	February 28	Pittsburgh	3–2	SO	Shesterkin	Madison Square Garden	17,889	23–29–7	53	

March: 8–6–2, 18 points (home: 5–3–1; road: 3–3–1)

Game	Date	Opponent	Score	OT	Decision	Location	Attendance	Record	Points	Recap
60	March 2	Columbus	4–5	OT	Shesterkin	Madison Square Garden	16,790	23–29–8	54	
61	March 5	Toronto	6–2		Shesterkin	Madison Square Garden	17,262	24–29–8	56	
62	March 7	@ New Jersey	3–6		Quick	Prudential Center	16,514	24–30–8	56	
63	March 9	@ Philadelphia	6–2		Shesterkin	Xfinity Mobile Arena	19,557	25–30–8	58	
64	March 10	Calgary	4–0		Quick	Madison Square Garden	16,669	26–30–8	60	
65	March 12	@ Winnipeg	6–3		Shesterkin	Canada Life Centre	13,763	27–30–8	62	
66	March 14	@ Minnesota	4–2		Shesterkin	Grand Casino Arena	18,925	28–30–8	64	
67	March 16	Los Angeles	1–4		Shesterkin	Madison Square Garden	17,752	28–31–8	64	
68	March 18	New Jersey	3–6		Quick	Madison Square Garden	17,307	28–32–8	64	
69	March 19	@ Columbus	3–6		Shesterkin	Nationwide Arena	15,829	28–33–8	64	
70	March 22	Winnipeg	2–3	SO	Garand	Madison Square Garden	17,349	28–33–9	65	
71	March 23	Ottawa	1–2		Shesterkin	Madison Square Garden	17,204	28–34–9	65	
72	March 25	@ Toronto	3–4		Shesterkin	Scotiabank Arena	18,397	28–34–9	65	
73	March 27	Chicago	6–1		Garand	Madison Square Garden	18,006	29–34–9	67	
74	March 29	Florida	3–1		Shesterkin	Madison Square Garden	17,244	30–34–9	69	
75	March 31	New Jersey	4–1		Shesterkin	Madison Square Garden	17,422	31–34–9	71	

April: 3–4–0, 6 points (home: 2–2–0; road: 1–2–0)

Game	Date	Opponent	Score	OT	Decision	Location	Attendance	Record	Points	Recap
76	April 2	Montreal	2–3		Shesterkin	Madison Square Garden	17,424	31–35–9	71	
77	April 4	Detroit	4–1		Quick	Madison Square Garden	17,292	32–35–9	73	
78	April 5	Washington	8–1		Shesterkin	Madison Square Garden	17,335	33–35–9	75	
79	April 8	Buffalo	3–5		Shesterkin	Madison Square Garden	18,006	33–36–9	75	
80	April 11	@ Dallas	0–2		Shesterkin	American Airlines Center	18,532	33–37–9	75	
81	April 13	@ Florida	2–3		Quick	Amerant Bank Arena	19,707	33–38–9	75	
82	April 15	@ Tampa Bay	4–2		Garand	Benchmark International Arena	19,092	34–38–9	77	

Legend: Win (2 points) Loss (0 points) Overtime/shootout loss (1 point)

== Player statistics ==
=== Skaters ===
As of April 15, 2026

Regular season
Player	GP	G	A	Pts	+/−	PIM
Mika Zibanejad	81	34	44	78	–20	14
Alexis Lafreniere	82	24	33	57	–7	20
Artemi Panarin^{‡}	52	19	38	57	–16	14
J. T. Miller	68	17	36	53	–30	33
Vincent Trocheck	67	16	37	53	–16	64
Adam Fox	55	9	44	53	+5	20
Will Cuylle	82	20	18	38	–12	65
Vladislav Gavrikov	82	14	21	35	–8	50
Gabe Perreault	49	12	15	27	0	10
Noah Laba	74	9	15	24	+2	31
Taylor Raddysh	68	9	10	19	+5	12
Conor Sheary	62	7	11	18	+1	14
Matthew Robertson	72	6	12	18	–1	38
Braden Schneider	82	2	16	18	–5	26
Jonny Brodzinski	55	6	10	16	–1	12
Will Borgen	75	5	10	15	+3	41
Tye Kartye^{†}	24	5	9	14	0	17
Sam Carrick^{‡}	60	4	6	10	–2	53
Carson Soucy^{‡}	46	3	5	8	+4	18
Jaroslav Chmelar	28	4	2	6	–2	11
Urho Vaakanainen	34	0	6	6	0	14
Scott Morrow	29	0	6	6	–5	4
Adam Edstrom	35	3	2	5	+1	2
Adam Sykora	11	3	1	4	0	5
Juuso Parssinen	20	2	1	3	+4	10
Drew Fortescue	9	0	2	2	+4	4
Matt Rempe	26	1	0	1	–4	11
Brennan Othmann^{‡}	17	1	0	1	–4	11
Anton Blidh	4	0	1	1	+1	0
Brendan Brisson	3	0	1	1	–1	0
Justin Dowling	2	0	0	0	–1	0
Connor Mackey	3	0	0	0	–3	4
Brett Berard	13	0	0	0	–1	6
Vincent Iorio^{†}	6	0	0	0	0	0

=== Goaltenders ===
Regular season
Player	GP	GS	TOI	W	L	OT	GA	GAA	SA	SV%	SO	G	A	PIM
Igor Shesterkin	51	51	3024:13	25	19	6	126	2.50	1425	.912	1	0	0	4
Jonathan Quick	25	24	1418:00	6	17	2	73	3.09	671	.891	2	0	1	14
Dylan Garand	3	3	185:00	2	0	1	5	1.62	96	.948	0	0	0	0
Spencer Martin	6	4	290:39	1	3	0	20	4.13	147	.864	0	0	0	0

- ^{†} Denotes player spent time with another team before joining the Rangers. Stats reflect time with the Rangers only.
- ^{‡} Denotes player was traded mid-season. Stats reflect time with the Rangers only.
- Bold/italics denotes franchise record.

== Awards and honors ==
=== Awards ===
Regular season
Player	Award	Date
Mika Zibanejad	Steven McDonald Extra Effort Award	March 31, 2026

=== Milestones ===
Regular season
Player	Milestone	Reached
New York Rangers Franchise	100th NHL season	October 7, 2025
Noah Laba	1st NHL career game	October 7, 2025
Noah Laba	1st NHL career point	October 11, 2025
Matthew Robertson	1st NHL career goal	October 19, 2025
Noah Laba	1st NHL career goal	October 26, 2025
Gabriel Perreault	1st NHL career point	November 10, 2025
Gabriel Perreault	1st NHL career goal	December 18, 2025
Mike Sullivan	500th NHL career win	January 17, 2026
Brennan Othmann	1st NHL career goal	January 17, 2026
Matthew Robertson	1st NHL career overtime goal	January 26, 2026
Jaroslav Chmelař	1st NHL career goal	March 5, 2026
Dylan Garand	1st NHL career start	March 22, 2026
Mika Zibanejad	1,000th career game	March 23, 2026
Adam Sykora	1st NHL career game	March 25, 2026
Drew Fortescue	1st NHL career game 1st NHL career point	March 28, 2026
Adam Sykora	1st NHL career goal	March 28, 2026
Dylan Garand	1st NHL career win	March 28, 2026
Gabriel Perreault	1st NHL career hat-trick	April 4, 2026
Will Cuylle	1st NHL career hat-trick	April 5, 2026

=== Records ===
Regular season
Mika Zibanejad	117th NHL career power play goal (All-time leader in franchise history)	January 17, 2026
Mika Zibanejad	1st NHL career hat-trick ever in an outdoor game 1st 5-point game outdoors by an NHL player (3 goals, 2 assists)	January 2, 2026
Alexis Lafrenière	Tied NHL record for most career assists (3) in an outdoor game (3-way tie with Noah Dobson, Marián Hossa, and Henrik Zetterberg)	January 2, 2026

== Transactions ==
The Rangers have been involved in the following transactions during the 2025–26 season.

=== Trades ===
Date	Details		Ref
July 1, 2025	To Carolina Hurricanes K'Andre Miller	To New York Rangers Scott Morrow conditional 1st-round pick in 2026 or 1st-round pick in 2027; 2nd-round pick in 2026	
January 26, 2026	To New York Islanders Carson Soucy	To New York Rangers 3rd-round pick in 2026	
February 4, 2026	To Los Angeles Kings Artemi Panarin*	To New York Rangers Liam Greentree conditional CBJ 2nd-round pick in 2026 or LAK 2nd-round pick in 2026 or DAL 3rd-round pick in 2026 or LAK 3rd-round pick in 2026 conditional DAL 4th-round pick in 2028	
March 6, 2026	To Buffalo Sabres Sam Carrick	To New York Rangers 3rd-round pick in 2026; CHI 6th-round pick in 2026	
March 6, 2026	To Chicago Blackhawks Derrick Pouliot	To New York Rangers Aidan Thompson	
March 6, 2026	To Calgary Flames Brennan Othmann	To New York Rangers Jacob Battaglia	

=== Free agents ===
Date	Player	Team	Contract term	Ref
July 1, 2025	Alex Belzile	to Montreal Canadiens	1-year	
July 1, 2025	Justin Dowling	from New Jersey Devils	2-year	
July 1, 2025	Vladislav Gavrikov	from Los Angeles Kings	7-year	
July 1, 2025	Benoit-Olivier Groulx	to Toronto Maple Leafs	2-year	
July 1, 2025	Zac Jones	to Buffalo Sabres	1-year	
July 1, 2025	Derrick Pouliot	from Tampa Bay Lightning	2-year	
July 1, 2025	Taylor Raddysh	from Washington Capitals	2-year	
July 2, 2025	Nicolas Aube-Kubel	to Minnesota Wild	1-year	
July 2, 2025	Arthur Kaliyev	to Ottawa Senators	1-year	
July 3, 2025	Trey Fix-Wolansky	from Columbus Blue Jackets	1-year	
July 16, 2025	Jake Leschyshyn	to Buffalo Sabres	1-year	
October 6, 2025	Conor Sheary	from Tampa Bay Lightning	1-year	
November 12, 2025	Spencer Martin	from HC CSKA Moscow (KHL)	2-year	

=== Waivers ===
Date	Player	Team	Ref
January 31, 2026	Vincent Iorio	San Jose Sharks	
February 27, 2026	Tye Kartye	Seattle Kraken	

=== Contract terminations ===
Date	Player	Via	Ref

=== Retirement ===
Date	Player	Ref
July 8, 2025	Riley Nash	
August 12, 2025	Chad Ruhwedel	

=== Signings ===
Date	Player	Term	Ref
July 1, 2025	K'Andre Miller	8-year	
July 1, 2025	Will Cuylle	2-year	
October 23, 2025	Nathan Aspinall	3-year†	
March 13, 2026	Brody Lamb	2-year†	
March 21, 2026	Drew Fortescue	3-year†	

==== Key ====
† Contract is entry-level.

‡ Contract takes effect in the 2026–27 season.

== Draft picks ==
Below are the New York Rangers' selections at the 2025 NHL entry draft, which was held on June 27 and 28, 2025, at the Peacock Theater in Los Angeles, California.

Round	#	Player	Pos	Nationality	College/junior/club team
2	43	Malcolm Spence	LW	Canada	Erie Otters (OHL)
3	70	Sean Barnhill	D	United States	Dubuque Fighting Saints (USHL)
3	89	Artyom Gonchar	D	Russia	Magnitogorsk Stalnye Lisy (MHL)
4	111	Mikkel Eriksen	C	Norway	Färjestad BK J20 (J20 Nationell)
5	139	Zeb Lindgren	D	Sweden	Skellefteå AIK J20 (J20 Nationell)
6	166	Samuel Jung	RW	Czech Republic	Kärpät U20 (U20 SM-sarja)
6	171	Evan Passmore	D	Canada	Barrie Colts (OHL)
7	203	Felix Farhammer	D	Sweden	Örebro HK (SHL)
