= 2025–26 Carolina Hurricanes season =

Season of play of professional ice hockey team

2025–26 Carolina Hurricanes
- Stanley Cup champions
- Eastern Conference champions
- Metropolitan Division champions
- Division: 1st Metropolitan
- Conference: 1st Eastern
- 2025–26 record: 53–22–7
- Home record: 29–10–2
- Road record: 24–12–5
- Goals for: 296
- Goals against: 240

Team information
- General manager: Eric Tulsky
- Coach: Rod Brind'Amour
- Captain: Jordan Staal
- Alternate captains: Sebastian Aho; Jordan Martinook; Jaccob Slavin
- Arena: Lenovo Center
- Minor league affiliates: Chicago Wolves (AHL); Greensboro Gargoyles (ECHL)

Team leaders
- Goals: Seth Jarvis (32)
- Assists: Sebastian Aho (53)
- Points: Sebastian Aho (80)
- Penalty minutes: Andrei Svechnikov (66)
- Plus/minus: Alexander Nikishin (+17)
- Wins: Brandon Bussi (31)
- Goals against average: Pyotr Kochetkov (2.33)

The 2025–26 Carolina Hurricanes season was the 47th season (46th season of play) for the National Hockey League (NHL) franchise that was established in June 1979, and the 28th season since the franchise relocated from the Hartford Whalers to start the 1997–98 season. The Hurricanes defeated the Vegas Golden Knights in the 2026 Stanley Cup Final, ending a 20-year Stanley Cup championship drought.

On April 2, 2026, the Hurricanes clinched their eighth consecutive playoff spot after a 5–1 win against the Columbus Blue Jackets. Five days later, on April 7, Carolina won its fourth division title in six seasons, and on April 13, clinched the best record in the Eastern Conference.

In the playoffs, the Hurricanes became the first team since the 1984–85 Edmonton Oilers and the first since the four-round, seven-game format was implemented in 1987 to start the playoffs 8–0, sweeping the Ottawa Senators and Philadelphia Flyers, before defeating the Montreal Canadiens in the Eastern Conference final in five games, and advancing to the Stanley Cup Final for the first time since 2006, where they defeated the Vegas Golden Knights in six games to win their second Stanley Cup in franchise history. Out of a possible 28 games (if every series required seven games to decide a winner), Carolina only took 19 games to win the Stanley Cup, finishing the playoffs with a record of 16–3, the fewest losses by a champion since the 1987–88 Oilers. The Hurricanes also became the first team from the Metropolitan Division to reach the Stanley Cup Final since the 2017–18 Washington Capitals.

== Standings ==
=== Divisional standings ===
Metropolitan Division
Pos	Team	GP	W	L	OTL	RW	GF	GA	GD	Pts
1	z – Carolina Hurricanes	82	53	22	7	39	296	240	+56	113
2	x – Pittsburgh Penguins	82	41	25	16	34	293	268	+25	98
3	x – Philadelphia Flyers	82	43	27	12	27	250	243	+7	98
4	Washington Capitals	82	43	30	9	37	263	244	+19	95
5	Columbus Blue Jackets	82	40	30	12	28	253	253	0	92
6	New York Islanders	82	43	34	5	29	233	241	−8	91
7	New Jersey Devils	82	42	37	3	29	230	254	−24	87
8	New York Rangers	82	34	39	9	25	238	250	−12	77

Source: National Hockey League
Rules for classification: 1) Fewer number of games played (GP, only during regular season); 2) Greater number of regulation wins (RW); 3) Greater number of wins in regulation and overtime, excluding shootout wins (ROW); 4) Greater number of total wins, including shootouts (W); 5) Greater number of points earned in head-to-head play; if teams played an uneven number of head-to-head games, the result of the first game on the home ice of the team with the extra home game is discarded; 6) Greater goal differential (GD); 7) Greater number of goals scored (GF)
x – Clinched playoff spot; z – Clinched conference

=== Conference standings ===
Eastern Conference Wild Card
Pos	Div	Team	GP	W	L	OTL	RW	GF	GA	GD	Pts
1	AT	x – Boston Bruins	82	45	27	10	33	272	250	+22	100
2	AT	x – Ottawa Senators	82	44	27	11	38	278	246	+32	99
3	ME	Washington Capitals	82	43	30	9	37	263	244	+19	95
4	AT	Detroit Red Wings	82	41	31	10	30	241	258	−17	92
5	ME	Columbus Blue Jackets	82	40	30	12	28	253	253	0	92
6	ME	New York Islanders	82	43	34	5	29	233	241	−8	91
7	ME	New Jersey Devils	82	42	37	3	29	230	254	−24	87
8	AT	Florida Panthers	82	40	38	4	32	251	276	−25	84
9	AT	Toronto Maple Leafs	82	32	36	14	23	253	299	−46	78
10	ME	New York Rangers	82	34	39	9	25	238	250	−12	77

Source: National Hockey League
Rules for classification: 1) Fewer number of games played (GP, only during regular season); 2) Greater number of regulation wins (RW); 3) Greater number of wins in regulation and overtime, excluding shootout wins (ROW); 4) Greater number of total wins, including shootouts (W); 5) Greater number of points earned in head-to-head play; if teams played an uneven number of head-to-head games, the result of the first game on the home ice of the team with the extra home game is discarded; 6) Greater goal differential (GD); 7) Greater number of goals scored (GF)
x – Clinched playoff spot

== Schedule and results ==
=== Preseason ===
The Carolina Hurricanes preseason schedule was released on June 24, 2025.

2025 preseason game log: 1–3–2 (Home: 1–2–0; Road: 0–1–2)

Game	Date	Opponent	Score	OT	Decision	Location	Attendance	Record	Recap
1	September 22	Tampa Bay	1–2		Primeau	Lenovo Center	13,925	0–1–0	
2	September 24	Florida	2–4		Miftakhov	Lenovo Center	18,299	0–2–0	
3	September 26	@ Tampa Bay	5–6		Miftakhov	Benchmark International Arena	13,449	0–3–0	
4	September 28	Nashville	4–2		Primeau	Lenovo Center	14,211	1–3–0	
5	September 29	@ Florida	3–4	OT	Quapp	Amerant Bank Arena	15,895	1–3–1	
6	October 4	@ Nashville	2–3	OT	Kochetkov	Bridgestone Arena	17,724	1–3–2	

Win Loss Overtime/shootout loss

=== Regular season ===
The Carolina Hurricanes regular season schedule was released on July 16, 2025.

2025–26 game log
October: 7–3–0 (Home: 3–1–0; Road: 4–2–0)

Game	Date	Opponent	Score	OT	Decision	Location	Attendance	Record	Points	Recap
1	October 9	New Jersey	6–3		Andersen	Lenovo Center	18,404	1–0–0	2	
2	October 11	Philadelphia	4–3	OT	Andersen	Lenovo Center	18,357	2–0–0	4	
3	October 14	@ San Jose	5–1		Bussi	SAP Center	12,786	3–0–0	6	
4	October 16	@ Anaheim	4–1		Andersen	Honda Center	16,145	4–0–0	8	
5	October 18	@ Los Angeles	4–3	OT	Bussi	Crypto.com Arena	18,145	5–0–0	10	
6	October 20	@ Vegas	1–4		Andersen	T-Mobile Arena	17,682	5–1–0	10	
7	October 23	@ Colorado	5–4	SO	Andersen	Ball Arena	18,092	6–1–0	12	
8	October 25	@ Dallas	2–3		Bussi	American Airlines Center	18,532	6–2–0	12	
9	October 28	Vegas	3–6		Andersen	Lenovo Center	18,299	6–3–0	12	
10	October 30	NY Islanders	6–2		Bussi	Lenovo Center	18,299	7–3–0	14	

November: 9–4–2 (Home: 5–2–1; Road: 4–2–1)

Game	Date	Opponent	Score	OT	Decision	Location	Attendance	Record	Points	Recap
11	November 1	@ Boston	1–2		Andersen	TD Garden	17,850	7–4–0	14	
12	November 4	@ NY Rangers	3–0		Kochetkov	Madison Square Garden	17,147	8–4–0	16	
13	November 6	Minnesota	4–3		Andersen	Lenovo Center	18,299	9–4–0	18	
14	November 8	Buffalo	6–3		Kochetkov	Lenovo Center	18,299	10–4–0	20	
15	November 9	@ Toronto	5–4		Bussi	Scotiabank Arena	18,395	11–4–0	22	
16	November 11	Washington	1–4		Andersen	Lenovo Center	18,299	11–5–0	22	
17	November 14	Vancouver	4–3	OT	Kochetkov	Lenovo Center	18,299	12–5–0	24	
18	November 15	Edmonton	3–4	OT	Andersen	Lenovo Center	18,299	12–5–1	25	
19	November 17	@ Boston	3–1		Kochetkov	TD Garden	17,850	13–5–1	27	
20	November 19	@ Minnesota	3–4	SO	Andersen	Grand Casino Arena	16,087	13–5–2	28	
21	November 21	@ Winnipeg	4–3		Bussi	Canada Life Centre	15,225	14–5–2	30	
22	November 23	@ Buffalo	1–4		Andersen	KeyBank Center	18,027	14–6–2	30	
23	November 26	NY Rangers	2–4		Andersen	Lenovo Center	18,299	14–7–2	30	
24	November 28	Winnipeg	5–1		Bussi	Lenovo Center	18,312	15–7–2	32	
25	November 30	Calgary	1–0	OT	Bussi	Lenovo Center	18,299	16–7–2	34	

December: 8–5–1 (Home: 5–3–0; Road: 3–2–1)

Game	Date	Opponent	Score	OT	Decision	Location	Attendance	Record	Points	Recap
26	December 4	Toronto	1–5		Andersen	Lenovo Center	18,299	16–8–2	34	
27	December 6	Nashville	6–3		Bussi	Lenovo Center	18,299	17–8–2	36	
28	December 7	San Jose	1–4		Kochetkov	Lenovo Center	18,299	17–9–2	36	
29	December 9	Columbus	4–1		Bussi	Lenovo Center	18,299	18–9–2	38	
30	December 11	@ Washington	3–2	SO	Bussi	Capital One Arena	18,185	19–9–2	40	
31	December 13	@ Philadelphia	4–3	SO	Kochetkov	Xfinity Mobile Arena	17,726	20–9–2	42	
32	December 14	Philadelphia	3–2	SO	Bussi	Lenovo Center	18,125	21–9–2	44	
33	December 17	@ Nashville	4–1		Kochetkov	Bridgestone Arena	17,159	22–9–2	46	
34	December 19	@ Florida	3–4	SO	Bussi	Amerant Bank Arena	19,217	22–9–3	47	
35	December 20	@ Tampa Bay	4–6		Kochetkov	Benchmark International Arena	19,092	22–10–3	47	
36	December 23	Florida	2–5		Andersen	Lenovo Center	18,318	22–11–3	47	
37	December 27	Detroit	5–2		Bussi	Lenovo Center	18,321	23–11–3	49	
38	December 29	NY Rangers	3–2	OT	Bussi	Lenovo Center	18,309	24–11–3	51	
39	December 30	@ Pittsburgh	1–5		Andersen	PPG Paints Arena	16,011	24–12–3	51	

January: 9–3–3 (Home: 6–2–1; Road: 3–1–2)

Game	Date	Opponent	Score	OT	Decision	Location	Attendance	Record	Points	Recap
40	January 1	Montreal	7–5		Bussi	Lenovo Center	18,299	24–13–3	51	
41	January 3	Colorado	3–5		Andersen	Lenovo Center	18,351	24–14–3	51	
42	January 4	@ New Jersey	3–1		Bussi	Prudential Center	16,092	25–14–3	53	
43	January 6	Dallas	6–3		Bussi	Lenovo Center	18,299	26–14–3	55	
44	January 8	Anaheim	5–2		Andersen	Lenovo Center	18,299	27–14–3	57	
45	January 10	Seattle	3–2		Bussi	Lenovo Center	18,310	28–14–3	59	
46	January 12	@ Detroit	3–4	OT	Andersen	Little Caesars Arena	19,515	28–14–4	60	
47	January 13	@ St. Louis	0–3		Bussi	Enterprise Center	18,096	28–15–4	60	
48	January 16	Florida	9–1		Bussi	Lenovo Center	18,319	29–15–4	62	
49	January 17	@ New Jersey	4–1		Andersen	Prudential Center	16,514	30–15–4	64	
50	January 19	Buffalo	2–1		Bussi	Lenovo Center	18,321	31–15–4	66	
51	January 22	Chicago	3–4	SO	Andersen	Lenovo Center	18,323	31–15–5	67	
52	January 24	@ Ottawa	4–1		Bussi	Canadian Tire Centre	17,155	32–15–5	69	
53	January 29	Utah	5–4		Bussi	Lenovo Center	18,302	33–15–5	71	
54	January 31	@ Washington	3–4	OT	Andersen	Capital One Arena	18,347	33–15–6	72	

February: 5–0–0 (Home: 4–0–0; Road: 1–0–0)

Game	Date	Opponent	Score	OT	Decision	Location	Attendance	Record	Points	Recap
55	February 1	Los Angeles	3–2	OT	Bussi	Lenovo Center	18,299	34–15–6	74	
56	February 3	Ottawa	4–3		Bussi	Lenovo Center	18,299	35–15–6	76	
57	February 5	@ NY Rangers	2–0		Bussi	Madison Square Garden	17,288	36–15–6	78	
58	February 26	Tampa Bay	5–4		Bussi	Lenovo Center	18,565	37–15–6	80	
59	February 28	Detroit	5–2		Andersen	Lenovo Center	18,571	38–15–6	82	

March: 9–6–0 (Home: 3–2–0; Road: 6–4–0)

Game	Date	Opponent	Score	OT	Decision	Location	Attendance	Record	Points	Recap
60	March 2	@ Seattle	1–2		Andersen	Climate Pledge Arena	17,151	38–16–6	82	
61	March 4	@ Vancouver	6–4		Bussi	Rogers Arena	18,004	39–16–6	84	
62	March 6	@ Edmonton	6–3		Andersen	Rogers Place	18,347	40–16–6	86	
63	March 7	@ Calgary	4–5		Bussi	Scotiabank Saddledome	18,302	40–17–6	86	
64	March 10	Pittsburgh	5–4	SO	Andersen	Lenovo Center	18,569	41–17–6	88	
65	March 12	St. Louis	3–1		Bussi	Lenovo Center	18,562	41–18–6	88	
66	March 14	@ Tampa Bay	4–2		Andersen	Benchmark International Arena	19,092	42–18–6	90	
67	March 17	@ Columbus	1–5		Bussi	Nationwide Arena	16,156	42–19–6	90	
68	March 18	Pittsburgh	6–5	OT	Andersen	Lenovo Center	18,581	43–19–6	92	
69	March 20	@ Toronto	4–3	OT	Bussi	Scotiabank Arena	18,329	44–19–6	94	
70	March 22	@ Pittsburgh	5–1		Andersen	PPG Paints Arena	18,048	45–19–6	96	
71	March 24	@ Montreal	2–5		Andersen	Bell Centre	20,962	45–20–6	96	
72	March 28	New Jersey	5–2		Bussi	Lenovo Center	18,579	46–20–6	98	
73	March 29	Montreal	1–3		Andersen	Lenovo Center	18,551	46–21–6	98	
74	March 31	@ Columbus	5–2		Bussi	Nationwide Arena	18,293	47–21–6	100	

April: 6–1–1 (Home: 3–0–0; Road: 3–1–1)

Game	Date	Opponent	Score	OT	Decision	Location	Attendance	Record	Points	Recap
75	April 2	Columbus	5–1		Andersen	Lenovo Center	18,556	48–21–6	102	
76	April 4	NY Islanders	4–3		Bussi	Lenovo Center	18,567	49–21–6	104	
77	April 5	@ Ottawa	3–6		Andersen	Canadian Tire Centre	16,857	49–22–6	104	
78	April 7	Boston	6–5	OT	Bussi	Lenovo Center	18,571	50–22–6	106	
79	April 9	@ Chicago	7–2		Andersen	United Center	18,039	51–22–6	108	
80	April 11	@ Utah	4–1		Andersen	Delta Center	12,478	52–22–6	110	
81	April 13	@ Philadelphia	2–3	SO	Bussi	Xfinity Mobile Arena	19,795	52–22–7	111	
82	April 14	@ NY Islanders	2–1		Bussi	UBS Arena	15,231	53–22–7	113	

Win (2 points) Loss (0 points) Overtime/shootout loss (1 point)

=== Playoffs ===
2026 Stanley Cup playoffs
Eastern Conference first round vs. (WC2) Ottawa Senators: Carolina won 4–0

Game	Date	Opponent	Score	OT	Decision	Location	Attendance	Series	Recap
1	April 18	Ottawa	2–0		Andersen	Lenovo Center	18,588	1–0	
2	April 20	Ottawa	3–2	2OT	Andersen	Lenovo Center	18,591	2–0	
3	April 23	@ Ottawa	2–1		Andersen	Canadian Tire Centre	18,753	3–0	
4	April 25	@ Ottawa	4–2		Andersen	Canadian Tire Centre	18,793	4–0	

Eastern Conference second round vs. (M3) Philadelphia Flyers: Carolina won 4–0

Game	Date	Opponent	Score	OT	Decision	Location	Attendance	Series	Recap
1	May 2	Philadelphia	3–0		Andersen	Lenovo Center	18,620	1–0	
2	May 4	Philadelphia	3–2	OT	Andersen	Lenovo Center	18,647	2–0	
3	May 7	@ Philadelphia	4–1		Andersen	Xfinity Mobile Arena	19,970	3–0	
4	May 9	@ Philadelphia	3–2	OT	Andersen	Xfinity Mobile Arena	19,394	4–0	

Eastern Conference final vs. (A3) Montreal Canadiens: Carolina won 4–1

Game	Date	Opponent	Score	OT	Decision	Location	Attendance	Series	Recap
1	May 21	Montreal	2–6		Andersen	Lenovo Center	18,723	0–1	
2	May 23	Montreal	3–2	OT	Andersen	Lenovo Center	18,819	1–1	
3	May 25	@ Montreal	3–2	OT	Andersen	Bell Centre	20,962	2–1	
4	May 27	@ Montreal	4–0		Andersen	Bell Centre	20,962	3–1	
5	May 29	Montreal	6–1		Andersen	Lenovo Center	18,931	4–1	

Stanley Cup Final vs. (P1) Vegas Golden Knights: Carolina won 4–2

Game	Date	Opponent	Score	OT	Decision	Location	Attendance	Series	Recap
1	June 2	Vegas	4–5		Andersen	Lenovo Center	18,738	0–1	
2	June 4	Vegas	4–3	OT	Andersen	Lenovo Center	18,710	1–1	
3	June 6	@ Vegas	4–5	2OT	Bussi	T-Mobile Arena	18,233	1–2	
4	June 9	@ Vegas	5–3		Bussi	T-Mobile Arena	18,339	2–2	
5	June 11	Vegas	4–2		Bussi	Lenovo Center	18,761	3–2	
6	June 14	@ Vegas	3–0		Bussi	T-Mobile Arena	18,354	4–2	

Legend: Win Loss

== Player statistics ==
As of game played on June 9, 2026

=== Skaters ===
Regular season
Player	GP	G	A	Pts	+/−	PIM
Sebastian Aho	79	27	53	80	+11	46
Nikolaj Ehlers	82	26	45	71	+8	14
Andrei Svechnikov	79	31	39	70	+1	66
Seth Jarvis	71	32	34	66	+6	23
Jackson Blake	81	22	31	53	+4	40
Shayne Gostisbehere	55	13	37	50	+11	22
Taylor Hall	80	18	30	48	+6	44
Logan Stankoven	81	21	23	44	+12	25
K'Andre Miller	72	8	29	37	+7	56
Jordan Staal	75	20	16	36	+5	29
Alexander Nikishin	81	11	22	33	+18	33
Sean Walker	81	9	22	31	+6	59
Jordan Martinook	77	12	17	29	+6	35
Mark Jankowski	68	11	10	21	+7	16
Eric Robinson	67	12	6	18	+7	8
William Carrier	70	7	11	18	+5	18
Jalen Chatfield	72	2	15	17	+15	18
Joel Nystrom	38	1	9	10	+6	6
Jesperi Kotkaniemi	42	2	7	9	+3	8
Mike Reilly	42	1	8	9	+11	26
Jaccob Slavin	39	1	7	8	+8	4
Bradly Nadeau	12	3	0	3	+1	2
Charles-Alexis Legault	12	1	1	2	+5	15
Nicolas Deslauriers^{†}	7	0	1	1	0	5
Justin Robidas	2	0	1	1	0	0
Felix Unger Sörum	1	0	1	1	+1	0
Skyler Brind'Amour	4	0	0	0	−2	2
Josiah Slavin	2	0	0	0	+1	2
Noah Philp^{†}	2	0	0	0	0	0
Domenick Fensore	1	0	0	0	−2	0
Ronan Seeley	1	0	0	0	0	0

Playoffs
Player	GP	G	A	Pts	+/−	PIM
Jackson Blake	19	7	13	20	+8	24
Taylor Hall	19	7	12	19	+14	14
Nikolaj Ehlers	18	8	10	18	+9	6
Logan Stankoven	19	11	5	16	+8	8
Jordan Staal	19	8	4	12	+6	13
Sebastian Aho	19	5	7	12	+4	10
Shayne Gostisbehere	19	3	9	12	+2	14
Seth Jarvis	19	4	7	11	+3	4
Andrei Svechnikov	19	6	5	11	−2	24
K'Andre Miller	19	0	9	9	+12	10
Eric Robinson	19	3	5	8	+5	16
Jalen Chatfield	19	1	7	8	+8	12
Mark Jankowski	19	1	4	5	+2	16
Jordan Martinook	19	2	3	5	+1	14
Jaccob Slavin	19	0	5	5	+4	0
William Carrier	19	0	4	4	+3	0
Sean Walker	19	0	3	3	+11	16
Mike Reilly	2	0	2	2	+2	2
Alexander Nikishin	17	0	1	1	-1	2
Nicolas Deslauriers	1	0	0	0	0	4

=== Goaltenders ===
Regular season
Player	GP	GS	TOI	W	L	OT	GA	GAA	SA	SV%	SO	G	A	PIM
Brandon Bussi	39	39	2360:49	31	6	2	97	2.47	912	.895	2	0	1	2
Frederik Andersen	35	35	2101:52	16	14	5	107	3.05	849	.874	0	0	1	4
Pyotr Kochetkov	9	8	490:09	6	2	0	19	2.33	189	.899	1	0	0	0

Playoffs
Player	GP	GS	TOI	W	L	GA	GAA	SA	SV%	SO	G	A	PIM
Frederik Andersen	16	16	1014:18	13	2	32	1.89	354	.910	3	0	0	2
Brandon Bussi	4	3	225:26	3	1	6	1.60	87	.931	1	0	0	0

^{†}Denotes player spent time with another team before joining the Hurricanes. Stats reflect time with the Hurricanes only.
^{‡}Denotes player was traded mid-season. Stats reflect time with the Hurricanes only.
Bold/italics denotes franchise record.

== Transactions ==
The Hurricanes have been involved in the following transactions during the 2025–26 season.

Key:

† Contract is entry-level.
‡ Contract initially takes effect in the 2026–27 season.

=== Trades ===
Date	Details		Ref
June 30, 2025	To Montreal Canadiens 7th-round pick in 2026	To Carolina Hurricanes Cayden Primeau	
July 1, 2025	To New York Rangers 1st-round pick in 2026 (conditional); 2nd-round pick in 2026; Scott Morrow	To Carolina Hurricanes K'Andre Miller	
January 5, 2026	To Utah Mammoth Future considerations	To Carolina Hurricanes Juuso Valimaki	
January 16, 2026	To San Jose Sharks 5th-round pick in 2027	To Carolina Hurricanes Kyle Masters; 4th-round pick in 2026	
January 24, 2026	To Buffalo Sabres Gavin Bayreuther	To Carolina Hurricanes Viktor Neuchev	
March 6, 2026	To Philadelphia Flyers 7th-round pick in 2027 (conditional)	To Carolina Hurricanes Nicolas Deslauriers	

=== Players acquired ===
Date	Player	Former team	Term	Via	Ref
July 1, 2025	Mike Reilly	New York Islanders	1-year	Free agency	
July 1, 2025	Amir Miftakhov	Ak Bars Kazan (KHL)	1-year	Free agency	
July 3, 2025	Nikolaj Ehlers	Winnipeg Jets	6-year	Free agency	
July 11, 2025	Gavin Bayreuther	Lausanne HC (NL)	1-year	Free agency	
October 3, 2025	Givani Smith	Philadelphia Flyers	1-year	Free agency	
October 5, 2025	Brandon Bussi	Florida Panthers		Waivers	
November 8, 2025	Cayden Primeau	Toronto Maple Leafs		Waivers	

=== Players lost ===
Date	Player	New team	Term	Via	Ref
July 1, 2025	Riley Stillman	Edmonton Oilers	2-year	Free agency	
July 2, 2025	Brent Burns	Colorado Avalanche	1-year	Free agency	
July 2, 2025	Spencer Martin	HC CSKA Moscow (KHL)	2-year	Free agency	
July 3, 2025	Dmitry Orlov	San Jose Sharks	2-year	Free agency	
July 16, 2025	Ty Smith	HC Dinamo Minsk (KHL)	1-year	Free agency	
July 23, 2025	Yaniv Perets	Lehigh Valley Phantoms (AHL)	1-year	Free agency	
October 1, 2025	Tyson Jost	Nashville Predators		Waivers	
October 6, 2025	Cayden Primeau	Toronto Maple Leafs		Waivers	
October 8, 2025	Jack Roslovic	Edmonton Oilers	1-year	Free agency	

=== Signings ===
Date	Player	Term	Ref
June 20, 2025	Eric Robinson	4-year	
June 26, 2025	Juha Jaaska	2-year	
July 1, 2025	Logan Stankoven	8-year‡	
July 2, 2025	Tyson Jost	1-year	
July 11, 2025	Noel Gunler	1-year	
July 16, 2025	Skyler Brind'Amour	1-year	
July 16, 2025	Domenick Fensore	1-year	
July 21, 2025	Ronan Seeley	1-year	
July 21, 2025	Ryan Suzuki	1-year	
July 24, 2025	Jackson Blake	8-year‡	
August 27, 2025	Ivan Ryabkin	3-year†	
May 12, 2026	Charlie Cerrato	3-year†	
May 20, 2026	Noel Fransén	3-year†	

== Draft picks ==
Below are the Carolina Hurricanes selections at the 2025 NHL entry draft, which was held on June 27 and 28, 2025, at the Peacock Theater in Los Angeles.

Round	#	Player	Pos	Nationality	College/Junior/Club team (League)
2	41	Semyon Frolov	G	Russia	JHC Spartak (MHL)
2	49	Charlie Cerrato	C	United States	Penn State (B1G)
2	62	Ivan Ryabkin	C	Russia	Muskegon Lumberjacks (USHL)
3	67	Kurban Limatov	D	Russia	MHC Dynamo Moscow (MHL)
3	87	Roman Bausov	D	Russia	HC Dinamo Saint Petersburg U20 (MHL)
6	183	Viggo Nordlund	LW	Sweden	Skellefteå AIK J20 (J20 Nationell)
7	221	Filip Ekberg	RW	Sweden	Ottawa 67's (OHL)
