= 2025–26 Buffalo Sabres season =

National Hockey League season

2025–26 Buffalo Sabres
- Atlantic Division champions
- Division: 1st Atlantic
- Conference: 2nd Eastern
- 2025–26 record: 50–23–9
- Home record: 26–10–5
- Road record: 24–13–4
- Goals for: 288
- Goals against: 241

Team information
- General manager: Kevyn Adams (Oct 9 – Dec 15); Jarmo Kekäläinen (Dec 15 – May 18)
- Coach: Lindy Ruff
- Captain: Rasmus Dahlin
- Alternate captains: Mattias Samuelsson; Tage Thompson; Alex Tuch
- Arena: KeyBank Center
- Average attendance: 17,428
- Minor league affiliates: Rochester Americans (AHL); Jacksonville Icemen (ECHL)

Team leaders
- Goals: Tage Thompson (40)
- Assists: Rasmus Dahlin (55)
- Points: Tage Thompson (81)
- Penalty minutes: Peyton Krebs (78)
- Plus/minus: Mattias Samuelsson (+41)
- Wins: Ukko-Pekka Luukkonen (22)
- Goals against average: Ukko-Pekka Luukkonen (2.52)

The 2025–26 Buffalo Sabres season was the 56th season of play for the Sabres in the National Hockey League (NHL). It was their second season since head coach Lindy Ruff returned to the team.

On December 15, 2025, after a 14–14–4 start to the season, the Sabres fired general manager Kevyn Adams after more than five seasons and replaced him with Jarmo Kekäläinen. The team then embarked on a string of sustained success, with separate win streaks of 10 and 8 games within a 32–6–2 run, the best 40-game run by any team since 1996 and tied for the fourth best in NHL history. The Sabres improved on their 36–39–7 record from the previous season after a 5–1 win on March 5, 2026, against the Pittsburgh Penguins. The streak helped Buffalo clinch just its second winning season since the beginning of the team's playoff drought, which began with the 2011–12 season, and helped the Sabres go from last place in the division in December to first place in the conference by March. Following a win over the New York Islanders on March 31, Buffalo reached 100 points for the first time since the 2009–10 season.

The Sabres ended their 14-season playoff drought when they clinched a playoff spot – for the first time since 2011 – on April 4, after the New York Rangers defeated the Detroit Red Wings. It was the longest such drought in NHL history, and was tied with the New York Jets (whose streak remains ongoing) for the longest active drought in the four major North American sports leagues. Following a 5–1 win over the Chicago Blackhawks on April 13 and Tampa Bay Lightning's 3–2 overtime win over the Detroit Red Wings, the Sabres clinched their first division title since 2009–10. They defeated the Boston Bruins in the first round of the playoffs 4–2, advancing to the second round for the first time since 2007, where they faced the Montreal Canadiens, losing in 7 games.

== Standings ==
=== Divisional standings ===
Atlantic Division
Pos	Team	GP	W	L	OTL	RW	GF	GA	GD	Pts
1	y – Buffalo Sabres	82	50	23	9	42	288	241	+47	109
2	x – Tampa Bay Lightning	82	50	26	6	40	290	231	+59	106
3	x – Montreal Canadiens	82	48	24	10	34	283	256	+27	106
4	x – Boston Bruins	82	45	27	10	33	272	250	+22	100
5	x – Ottawa Senators	82	44	27	11	38	278	246	+32	99
6	Detroit Red Wings	82	41	31	10	30	241	258	−17	92
7	Florida Panthers	82	40	38	4	32	251	276	−25	84
8	Toronto Maple Leafs	82	32	36	14	23	253	299	−46	78

Source: National Hockey League
Rules for classification: 1) Fewer number of games played (GP, only during regular season); 2) Greater number of regulation wins (RW); 3) Greater number of wins in regulation and overtime, excluding shootout wins (ROW); 4) Greater number of total wins, including shootouts (W); 5) Greater number of points earned in head-to-head play; if teams played an uneven number of head-to-head games, the result of the first game on the home ice of the team with the extra home game is discarded; 6) Greater goal differential (GD); 7) Greater number of goals scored (GF)
x – Clinched playoff spot; y – Clinched division

=== Conference standings ===
Eastern Conference Wild Card
Pos	Div	Team	GP	W	L	OTL	RW	GF	GA	GD	Pts
1	AT	x – Boston Bruins	82	45	27	10	33	272	250	+22	100
2	AT	x – Ottawa Senators	82	44	27	11	38	278	246	+32	99
3	ME	Washington Capitals	82	43	30	9	37	263	244	+19	95
4	AT	Detroit Red Wings	82	41	31	10	30	241	258	−17	92
5	ME	Columbus Blue Jackets	82	40	30	12	28	253	253	0	92
6	ME	New York Islanders	82	43	34	5	29	233	241	−8	91
7	ME	New Jersey Devils	82	42	37	3	29	230	254	−24	87
8	AT	Florida Panthers	82	40	38	4	32	251	276	−25	84
9	AT	Toronto Maple Leafs	82	32	36	14	23	253	299	−46	78
10	ME	New York Rangers	82	34	39	9	25	238	250	−12	77

Source: National Hockey League
Rules for classification: 1) Fewer number of games played (GP, only during regular season); 2) Greater number of regulation wins (RW); 3) Greater number of wins in regulation and overtime, excluding shootout wins (ROW); 4) Greater number of total wins, including shootouts (W); 5) Greater number of points earned in head-to-head play; if teams played an uneven number of head-to-head games, the result of the first game on the home ice of the team with the extra home game is discarded; 6) Greater goal differential (GD); 7) Greater number of goals scored (GF)
x – Clinched playoff spot

== Season summary ==
=== Off-season ===
This season marked significant change in their goaltending lineup, which started with them not resigning their veteran backup goalie from last season, James Reimer, who became their starter late in the season. In July 2025, the team decided to sign journeyman goalie Alex Lyon to become their backup goalie. A few days before the season began, the Sabres signed goaltender Colten Ellis off of waivers from the St. Louis Blues and he became their tertiary option for the rest of the season, with Colten Ellis playing his first ever NHL games during this time period.

The planned starting goaltender, Ukko-Pekka Luukkonen, suffered an injury during a preseason game against the Pittsburgh Penguins, which caused him to miss regular season playing time and resulted in Alex Lyon starting for the first few regular season games. Luukkonen was also injured later in the season, suffering a lower body injury that caused him to miss his planned Olympic starts.

=== Regular season ===
The Sabres began their season on October 9, 2025, starting off by scoring only two goals in their first three games. For the second year in a row, the Sabres lost their first three games of the season, all three losses being in regulation. They were the only team in the NHL without a road win before their comeback win in Detroit on November 15, 2025.

On October 22, 2025, Colten Ellis started his first NHL game on home ice against the Detroit Red Wings. He stopped 27 shots en route to a regulation win, becoming the first goaltender from Cape Breton Island to play in the NHL, the eighth from Nova Scotia, and the ninth Sabres goaltender to win in their debut.

On December 15, 2025, the Sabres fired general manager Kevyn Adams after reportedly failing to meet a Thanksgiving deadline to show that the team was better compared to last season, with the team having a 9–10–4 record by that point. This firing caused season-wide impact, as the team would go on multiple winning streaks and ultimately return to the playoffs for the first time since 2011.

All three goalies recorded a shutout during the regular season. Lyon shut out the Florida Panthers on October 18, 2025, winning 3–0, the New York Islanders on January 24, 2026, winning 5–0, and the San Jose Sharks on March 19, 2026, winning 5–0. Luukkonen shut out the Vegas Golden Knights on March 17, 2026, winning 2–0. Ellis shut out the Columbus Blue Jackets on April 9, 2026, winning 5–0.

On March 7, 2026, the Sabres played the Tampa Bay Lightning at home for what Sports Illustrated, USA Today, and The New York Times have called "the most eventful NHL game in decades". The teams combined for 15 goals and 28 penalties (the most since 1993) along with 102 penalty minutes (the most since 1989). There were multiple comebacks during the game. The Sabres led 3–0 and then 4–1 until the Lightning scored five straight, putting them down 6–4, then later 7–5, only to have a multi-goal comeback of their own to win 8–7 in regulation.

Sam Carrick, a veteran centre, was traded to the Buffalo Sabres by the New York Rangers and made an immediate impact upon his arrival. In the 13 regular season games he played, he earned 6 points. On March 31, 2026, Carrick injured his left arm during a fight with Anders Lee, which would cause him to miss the first round series against the Bruins.

=== Playoffs ===
==== Eastern Conference first round: vs. (WC1) Boston Bruins ====
The Sabres qualified for the playoffs for the first time since 2011 and played the Boston Bruins in the Eastern Conference first round. The Sabres–Bruins series marked the ninth time, and first since 2010, the teams have met in the playoffs, tying the most of any Sabres opponent with the Philadelphia Flyers.

The first game occurred on April 19, 2026. Despite trailing 2–0 early in the 3rd period and being given a 5.8% chance of winning, they tied the game with 4 minutes left, with Tage Thompson scoring both goals. Mattias Samuelsson scored with 3 minutes left to take Buffalo's first lead of the game, which they held on to, winning their first playoff game since 2011. The Sabres joined the New York Americans, with this comeback win, as the only team to win a playoff game in this fashion (the Americans doing so in Game 2 of the 1940 quarterfinals).

In Game 2, after Luukkonen allowed four goals in two periods, Alex Lyon took over his position in relief for his first playoff appearance the 2022–23 season. The Sabres would eventually lose this game 4–2, resulting in their first home regulation loss since March 27, 2026. Following this game, Lyon was given netminding duties for Game 3, marking his first playoff start since April 21, 2023. Noah Ostlund earned his first ever playoff point in his first ever playoff game, assisting on a goal from Bowen Byram, and later earned his first ever playoff goal, scoring an empty netter to seal the victory for the Sabres. Ostlund became the first Sabres rookie to earn multiple points in their first playoff game since 1993.

In the fourth game, Owen Power, with his assist on a goal from Bowen Byram, became the first player in franchise history with an assist in each of their first four career playoff games. Josh Doan, Peyton Krebs, Zach Benson, and Byram were the four Sabres who scored during the first period, becoming the first team since the Hartford Whalers in 1991 to score four goals against the Bruins in the first period of a playoff game. Beck Malenstyn and Alex Tuch each scored a goal during the third period, marking Malenstyn's first ever playoff goal, making the final score of the game 6–1.

Before the game began, a group of Sabres fans nicknamed the "Blade Gang", who have been at every playoff game with rollerblades and full gear, were outside TD Garden and rolling through North Station. Clips of these fans went viral on TikTok and Ruff commented on the group after the conclusion of the game, "I've seen the Blade Gang come to town — pretty cool. I'd actually like to play with those guys. I think it's the number of years where our fans are really enjoying this. It's great to see". These fans would later be invited by the team to bang the game drum for Game 5.

Before the fifth game began, Sabres anthem singer Cami Clune was performing “O Canada” when her microphone repeatedly cut out. In response to the technical issue, the home crowd loudly sang the anthem. After the moment went viral on social media, Canadian based brewery Molson Brewery collaborated with local bars in the area to make their beers free during the sixth game as thanks.

During the fifth game, Rasmus Dahlin earned his first career playoff goal after converting on a power play early in the first period. He would be the only goal scorer during the game, and they would eventually lose 2–1 in overtime.

Josh Norris scored his first career playoff goal on an empty net as the Sabres beat the Boston Bruins 4–1 to advance to the second round for the first time since 2007. This marked the first time since the 2006 Eastern Conference semifinals that the Sabres won all their road games in a series.

==== Eastern Conference second round: vs. (A3) Montreal Canadiens ====
Sam Carrick was originally listed as unavailable for the second round along with Noah Ostlund, with Lindy Ruff saying, "I don't believe either will be available in this series yet". However, Carrick was cleared by doctors a few days before the second round began, much faster than originally anticipated. Carrick returned to practice the following morning and played during Game 3.

Josh Doan and Zach Benson had points on both Sabres goals scored in the first period, with Doan scoring the first of the game and Ryan McLeod later scoring a power play goal. Jordan Greenway would score his first career playoff goal during the second period. The Sabres would go on to win this game 4–2, marking their first win in the second round since May 6, 2007.

The Sabres struggled in Game 2. A goal from Benson would be the only offensive output for the team, as they would go on to lose 5–1. The Sabres, trying to make up for this loss, would see Thompson score 53 seconds into Game 3. This was the fastest time for the Sabres to score a playoff goal since 2007. Despite the fast start, however, the team would lose hold of the game, giving up 3 goals in the second period and eventually losing 6–2.

Konsta Helenius, playing his first ever NHL playoff game, and Luke Schenn, playing his first ever playoff game for the Sabres, replaced Logan Stanley and Sam Carrick. Additionally, Ukko-Pekka Luukkonen replaced Alex Lyon as starting goaltender. Mattias Samuelsson opened up the scoring early in the first period, with a disallowed Jack Quinn goal almost giving the Sabres a 2–0 lead. After giving up 2 goals late in the first period, Tage Thompson tied the game in the second when he dumped a puck off the corner boards, hitting a glass stanchion that made the puck bounce towards the net awkwardly, hitting the surprised Canadiens goalie on the back of the leg which sent it into the net. Zach Benson, celebrating his 21st birthday, scored the game winning goal on the power play early into the third period. Sabres were able to hold on to the lead and win the game 3–2 to tie the series at 2–2.

The Sabres returned home for Game 5 on May 14. Helenius would eventually score his first ever playoff goal in the first period. Buffalo would score 2 more goals in the period and would lead 3–2 after the first. However, they would allow 4 consecutive goals the rest of the game, including three in the second period, en route to a 6–3 loss to push them to the brink of elimination. Game 6 would see a similar outcome, however this time in favor of the Sabres, as they would score seven consecutive goals after going down 3–1 early in the game to win 8–3 in Montreal and force Game 7. Zach Metsa, playing his first NHL playoff game, scored his first playoff goal late into the third period. Dahlin, who recorded four assists and one goal, became the first defenseman in NHL history with five points in an elimination game and the first player overall to earn that honor since 2018.

In Game 7, the Sabres would go down 2–0 after quick goals in the first period by the Canadiens. However, they would slowly claw back during the second and third periods to tie the game, off goals from Greenway and Dahlin. This would allow them to force overtime in Game 7, though they would ultimately fall to the Canadiens after Alex Newhook scored 11 minutes into the extra period, ending their season.

== Schedule and results ==
=== Preseason ===
The preseason schedule was published on June 24, 2025.

2025 preseason game log: 3–2–1 (Home: 2–1–0; Road: 1–1–1)
#	Date	Visitor	Score	Home	OT	Decision	Attendance	Record	Recap
1	September 22	Buffalo	4–0	Columbus		Georgiev	9,778	1–0
2	September 23	Columbus	1–2	Buffalo		Levi	9,903	2–0
3	September 25	Buffalo	2–5	Detroit		Georgiev	16,347	2–1
4	September 27	Detroit	2–5	Buffalo		Lyon	11,872	3–1
5	October 1	Pittsburgh	5–3	Buffalo		Georgiev	11,591	3–2
6	October 3	Buffalo	4–5	Pittsburgh	OT	Georgiev	11,528	3–3

=== Regular season ===
The regular season schedule was published on July 16, 2025.

2025–26 game log

October: 4–4–3: 11 points (Home: 4–2–1; Road: 0–2–2)
#	Date	Visitor	Score	Home	OT	Decision	Logo	Attendance	Record	Points	Recap
1	October 9	NY Rangers	4–0	Buffalo		Lyon (0–1–0)	Main	19,070	0–1–0	0
2	October 11	Buffalo	1–3	Boston		Lyon (0–2–0)	Main	17,850	0–2–0	0
3	October 13	Colorado	3–1	Buffalo		Lyon (0–3–0)	Main	16,462	0–3–0	0
4	October 15	Ottawa	4–8	Buffalo		Lyon (1–3–0)	Main	13,993	1–3–0	2
5	October 18	Florida	0–3	Buffalo		Lyon (2–3–0)	Main	16,015	2–3–0	4
6	October 20	Buffalo	2–4	Montreal		Lyon (2–4–0)	Main	20,962	2–4–0	4
7	October 22	Detroit	2–4	Buffalo		Ellis (1–0–0)	Main	15,104	3–4–0	6
8	October 24	Toronto	3–5	Buffalo		Lyon (3–4–0)	Alt	17,211	4–4–0	8
9	October 25	Buffalo	3–4	Toronto	OT	Luukkonen (0–0–1)	Main	18,792	4–4–1	9
10	October 28	Columbus	4–3	Buffalo	OT	Lyon (3–4–1)	Main	15,059	4–4–2	10
11	October 30	Buffalo	3–4	Boston	OT	Lyon (3–4–2)	Main	17,850	4–4–3	11

November: 6–7–1: 13 points (Home: 4–3–1; Road: 2–4–0)
#	Date	Visitor	Score	Home	OT	Decision	Logo	Attendance	Record	Points	Recap
12	November 1	Washington	3–4	Buffalo	SO	Luukkonen (1–0–1)	Main	19,070	5–4–3	13
13	November 4	Utah	2–1	Buffalo	OT	Lyon (3–4–3)	Main	16,202	5–4–4	14
14	November 6	St. Louis	3–0	Buffalo		Luukkonen (1–1–1)	Main	16,020	5–5–4	14
15	November 8	Buffalo	3–6	Carolina		Lyon (3–5–3)	Alt	18,299	5–6–4	14
16	November 12	Buffalo	2–5	Utah		Ellis (1–1–0)	Main	12,478	5–7–4	14
17	November 13	Buffalo	3–6	Colorado		Luukkonen (1–2–1)	Main	18,101	5–8–4	14
18	November 15	Buffalo	5–4	Detroit	OT	Ellis (2–1–0)	Main	19,515	6–8–4	16
19	November 17	Edmonton	1–5	Buffalo		Ellis (3–1–0)	Main	16,394	7–8–4	18
20	November 19	Calgary	6–2	Buffalo		Ellis (3–2–0)	Main	15,213	7–9–4	18
21	November 21	Chicago	3–9	Buffalo		Luukkonen (2–2–1)	Main	17,058	8–9–4	20
22	November 23	Carolina	1–4	Buffalo		Luukkonen (3–2–1)	Main	18,027	9–9–4	22
23	November 26	Buffalo	2–4	Pittsburgh		Luukkonen (3–3–1)	Alt	17,543	9–10–4	22
24	November 28	New Jersey	5–0	Buffalo		Lyon (3–6–3)	Alt	19,070	9–11–4	22
25	November 29	Buffalo	3–2	Minnesota	SO	Ellis (4–2–0)	Main	17,233	10–11–4	24

December: 11–3–0: 22 points (Home: 4–0–0; Road: 7–3–0)
#	Date	Visitor	Score	Home	OT	Decision	Logo	Attendance	Record	Points	Recap
26	December 1	Winnipeg	1–5	Buffalo		Luukkonen (4–3–1)	Main	15,758	11–11–4	26
27	December 3	Buffalo	2–5	Philadelphia		Ellis (4–3–0)	Alt	17,116	11–12–4	26
28	December 5	Buffalo	1–4	Winnipeg		Luukkonen (4–4–1)	Main	13,682	11–13–4	26
29	December 8	Buffalo	4–7	Calgary		Luukkonen (4–5–1)	Main	16,278	11–14–4	26
30	December 9	Buffalo	4–3	Edmonton	OT	Lyon (4–6–3) (Note: Ellis was the starter, but he left in the first period due to an upper body injury.)	Main	17,622	12–14–4	28
31	December 11	Buffalo	3–2	Vancouver		Lyon (5–6–3)	Main	18,606	13–14–4	30
32	December 14	Buffalo	3–1	Seattle		Lyon (6–6–3)	Main	17,151	14–14–4	32
33	December 18	Philadelphia	3–5	Buffalo		Lyon (7–6–3)	Alt	16,055	15–14–4	34
34	December 20	NY Islanders	2–3	Buffalo	SO	Lyon (8–6–3)	Main	19,070	16–14–4	36
35	December 21	Buffalo	3–1	New Jersey		Luukkonen (5–5–1)	Main	16,886	17–14–4	38
36	December 23	Buffalo	3–2	Ottawa	OT	Lyon (9–6–3)	Main	17,753	18–14–4	40
37	December 27	Boston	1–4	Buffalo		Luukkonen (6–5–1)	Alt	19,070	19–14–4	42
38	December 29	Buffalo	4–2	St. Louis		Lyon (10–6–3)	Main	18,096	20–14–4	44
39	December 31	Buffalo	4–1	Dallas		Luukkonen (7–5–1)	Main	18,532	21–14–4	46

January: 10–4–1: 21 points (Home: 5–2–1; Road: 5–2–0)
#	Date	Visitor	Score	Home	OT	Decision	Logo	Attendance	Record	Points	Recap
40	January 3	Buffalo	1–5	Columbus		Luukkonen (7–6–1)	Main	18,809	21–15–4	46
41	January 6	Vancouver	3–5	Buffalo		Luukkonen (8–6–1)	Main	17,036	22–15–4	48
42	January 8	Buffalo	5–2	NY Rangers		Ellis (5–3–0)	Main	18,006	23–15–4	50
43	January 10	Anaheim	3–5	Buffalo		Luukkonen (9–6–1)	Alt	19,070	24–15–4	52
44	January 12	Florida	4–3	Buffalo		Ellis (5–4–0)	Main	16,343	24–16–4	52
45	January 14	Philadelphia	2–5	Buffalo		Luukkonen (10–6–1)	Main	16,363	25–16–4	54
46	January 15	Montreal	3–5	Buffalo		Ellis (6–4–0)	Alt	19,070	26–16–4	56
47	January 17	Minnesota	5–4	Buffalo	OT	Luukkonen (10–6–2)	Main	19,070	26–16–5	57
48	January 19	Buffalo	1–2	Carolina		Luukkonen (10–7–2)	Main	18,321	26–17–5	57
49	January 20	Buffalo	5–3	Nashville		Lyon (11–6–3)	Main	17,159	27–17–5	59
50	January 22	Buffalo	4–2	Montreal		Luukkonen (11–7–2)	Main	20,962	28–17–5	61
51	January 24	Buffalo	5–0	NY Islanders		Lyon (12–6–3)	Main	17,255	29–17–5	63
52	January 27	Buffalo	7–4	Toronto		Ellis (7–4–0) (Note: Luukkonen was the starter, but he left in the first period due to a lower-body injury.)	Main	18,996	30–17–5	65
53	January 29	Los Angeles	1–4	Buffalo		Lyon (13–6–3)	Alt	19,070	31–17–5	67
54	January 31	Montreal	4–2	Buffalo		Lyon (13–7–3)	Main	19,070	31–18–5	67

February: 4–1–1: 9 points (Home: 0–1–0; Road: 4–0–1)
#	Date	Visitor	Score	Home	OT	Decision	Team Logo	Attendance	Record	Points	Recap
55	February 2	Buffalo	5–3	Florida		Lyon (14–7–3)	Main	19,474	32–18–5	69
56	February 3	Buffalo	3–4	Tampa Bay	OT	Ellis (7–4–1)	Main	19,092	32–18–6	70
57	February 5	Pittsburgh	5–2	Buffalo		Lyon (14–8–3)	Alt	19,070	32–19–6	70
58	February 25	Buffalo	2–1	New Jersey		Luukkonen (12–7–2)	Main	16,514	33–19–6	72
59	February 27	Buffalo	3–2	Florida		Lyon (15–8–3)	Main	19,783	34–19–6	74
60	February 28	Buffalo	6–2	Tampa Bay		Luukkonen (13–7–2)	Main	19,092	35–19–6	76

March: 11–2–2: 24 points (Home: 7–2–1; Road: 4–0–1)
#	Date	Visitor	Score	Home	OT	Decision	Logo	Attendance	Record	Points	Recap
61	March 3	Vegas	2–3	Buffalo		Lyon (16–8–3)	Main	19,070	36–19–6	78
62	March 5	Buffalo	5–1	Pittsburgh		Luukkonen (14–7–2)	Main	17,572	37–19–6	80
63	March 7	Nashville	2–3	Buffalo		Lyon (17–8–3)	Main	19,070	38–19–6	82
64	March 8	Tampa Bay	7–8	Buffalo		Luukkonen (15–7–2)	Alt	19,070	39–19–6	84
65	March 10	San Jose	3–6	Buffalo		Lyon (18–8–3)	Main	19,070	40–19–6	86
66	March 12	Washington	2–1	Buffalo		Luukkonen (15–8–2)	Alt	19,070	40–20–6	86
67	March 14	Toronto	2–3	Buffalo	SO	Lyon (19–8–3)	Main	19,070	41–20–6	88
68	March 17	Buffalo	2–0	Vegas		Luukkonen (16–8–2)	Main	17,844	42–20–6	90
69	March 19	Buffalo	5–0	San Jose		Lyon (20–8–3)	Main	17,435	43–20–6	92
70	March 21	Buffalo	4–1	Los Angeles		Luukkonen (17–8–2)	Main	18,145	44–20–6	94
71	March 22	Buffalo	5–6	Anaheim	OT	Lyon (20–8–4)	Main	16,817	44–20–7	95
72	March 25	Boston	4–3	Buffalo	OT	Luukkonen (17–8–3)	Main	19,070	44–20–8	96
73	March 27	Detroit	5–2	Buffalo		Lyon (20–9–4)	Main	19,070	44–21–8	96
74	March 28	Seattle	2–3	Buffalo	SO	Luukkonen (18–8–3)	Alt	19,070	45–21–8	98
75	March 31	NY Islanders	3–4	Buffalo		Luukkonen (19–8–3)	Main	19,070	46–21–8	100

April: 4–2–1: 9 points (Home: 2–0–1; Road: 2–2–0)
#	Date	Visitor	Score	Home	OT	Decision	Logo	Attendance	Record	Points	Recap
76	April 2	Buffalo	1–4	Ottawa		Luukkonen (19–9–3)	Main	17,086	46–22–8	100
77	April 4	Buffalo	2–6	Washington		Lyon (20–10–4) (Note: Lyon was the starter, but was replaced in the first period by Ellis due to poor play.)	Main	18,347	46–23–8	100
78	April 6	Tampa Bay	2–4	Buffalo		Luukkonen (20–9–3)	Alt	19,070	47–23–8	102
79	April 8	Buffalo	5–3	NY Rangers		Luukkonen (21–9–3)	Main	18,006	48–23–8	104
80	April 9	Columbus	0–5	Buffalo		Ellis (8–4–1)	Alt	19,070	49–23–8	106
81	April 13	Buffalo	5–1	Chicago		Luukkonen (22–9–3)	Main	17,056	50–23–8	108
82	April 15	Dallas	4–3	Buffalo	SO	Ellis (8–4–2)	Main	19,070	50–23–9	109

Legend: Win (2 points) Loss (0 points) Overtime/shootout loss (1 point)

=== Playoffs ===
2026 Stanley Cup playoffs

Eastern Conference first round vs. (WC1) Boston Bruins: Buffalo won 4–2
#	Date	Visitor	Score	Home	OT	Decision	Attendance	Record	Recap
1	April 19	Boston	3–4	Buffalo		Luukkonen (1–0)	19,070	1–0
2	April 21	Boston	4–2	Buffalo		Luukkonen (1–1)	19,070	1–1
3	April 23	Buffalo	3–1	Boston		Lyon (1–0)	17,850	2–1
4	April 26	Buffalo	6–1	Boston		Lyon (2–0)	17,850	3–1
5	April 28	Boston	2–1	Buffalo	OT	Lyon (2–1)	19,070	3–2
6	May 1	Buffalo	4–1	Boston		Lyon (3–1)	17,850	4–2

Eastern Conference second round vs. (A3) Montreal Canadiens: Montreal won 4–3
#	Date	Visitor	Score	Home	OT	Decision	Attendance	Record	Recap
1	May 6	Montreal	2–4	Buffalo		Lyon (4–1)	19,070	1–0
2	May 8	Montreal	5–1	Buffalo		Lyon (4–2)	19,070	1–1
3	May 10	Buffalo	2–6	Montreal		Lyon (4–3)	20,962	1–2
4	May 12	Buffalo	3–2	Montreal		Luukkonen (2–1)	20,962	2–2
5	May 14	Montreal	6–3	Buffalo		Luukkonen (2–2)	19,070	2–3
6	May 16	Buffalo	8–3	Montreal		Luukkonen (3–2)	20,962	3–3
7	May 18	Montreal	3–2	Buffalo	OT	Luukkonen (3–3)	19,070	3–4

Legend: Win Loss

== Player statistics ==
=== Skaters ===
Regular season
Player	GP	G	A	Pts	+/−	PIM
Tage Thompson	81	40	41	81	−6	35
Rasmus Dahlin	77	19	55	74	+18	76
Alex Tuch	79	33	33	66	+24	57
Ryan McLeod	81	14	40	54	+25	16
Josh Doan	82	25	27	52	−4	25
Jack Quinn	82	20	31	51	+4	18
Jason Zucker	62	24	21	45	−5	23
Zach Benson	65	13	30	43	+27	42
Bowen Byram	82	11	31	42	+15	48
Mattias Samuelsson	78	13	28	41	+41	28
Peyton Krebs	82	12	27	39	+13	78
Josh Norris	44	13	21	34	+11	28
Owen Power	81	8	21	29	+9	16
Noah Ostlund	60	11	16	27	+11	14
Beck Malenstyn	81	7	7	14	0	38
Conor Timmins	39	0	8	8	−8	18
Isak Rosen‡	16	3	4	7	−3	0
Sam Carrick†	13	5	1	6	+4	12
Tyson Kozak	46	2	4	6	−1	2
Zach Metsa	43	2	4	6	+16	8
Jordan Greenway	40	1	5	6	−10	29
Jiri Kulich	12	3	2	5	−4	4
Jacob Bryson‡	35	2	3	5	−1	8
Logan Stanley†	17	0	5	5	+5	29
Josh Dunne	34	1	3	4	−7	38
Konsta Helenius	9	1	3	4	+1	0
Tanner Pearson†	4	0	2	2	+2	2
Michael Kesselring	34	0	2	2	0	50
Luke Schenn†	4	0	0	0	−1	11
Mason Geertsen	5	0	0	0	−1	12
Justin Danforth	4	0	0	0	−2	2
Ryan Johnson	3	0	0	0	0	2
Trevor Kuntar	1	0	0	0	−1	0

Playoffs
Player	GP	G	A	Pts	+/−	PIM
Tage Thompson	13	5	10	15	0	22
Rasmus Dahlin	13	4	10	14	+4	20
Josh Doan	13	3	7	10	+6	8
Zach Benson	13	5	4	9	+6	64
Alex Tuch	13	4	3	7	0	8
Bowen Byram	13	4	3	7	0	12
Mattias Samuelsson	13	3	4	7	+4	2
Jack Quinn	13	2	5	7	−2	0
Peyton Krebs	13	2	4	6	+3	22
Owen Power	13	0	6	6	+5	0
Ryan McLeod	13	1	4	5	−7	2
Jason Zucker	13	2	2	4	−4	4
Jordan Greenway	13	2	1	3	−1	6
Beck Malenstyn	13	1	2	3	0	8
Josh Norris	10	1	2	3	+2	6
Konsta Helenius	4	2	0	2	+1	0
Noah Ostlund	3	1	1	2	+3	2
Conor Timmins	13	0	2	2	0	8
Zach Metsa	2	1	0	1	−1	0
Tyson Kozak	6	0	1	1	+2	0
Luke Schenn	2	0	0	0	−1	0
Sam Carrick	1	0	0	0	0	2
Logan Stanley	8	0	0	0	−2	19
Michael Kesselring	1	0	0	0	0	0
Josh Dunne	2	0	0	0	+1	0

=== Goaltenders ===
Regular season
Player	GP	GS	TOI	W	L	OT	GA	GAA	SA	SV%	SO	G	A	PIM
Ukko-Pekka Luukkonen	35	34	2,027:46	22	9	3	85	2.52	930	.910	1	0	1	4
Alex Lyon	36	34	1,992:01	20	10	4	92	2.77	979	.907	3	0	1	4
Colten Ellis	16	14	911:20	8	4	2	44	2.90	455	.903	1	0	1	0

Playoffs
Player	GP	GS	TOI	W	L	GA	GAA	SA	SV%	SO	G	A	PIM
Alex Lyon	10	8	463:26	4	3	20	2.59	209	.904	0	0	0	0
Ukko-Pekka Luukkonen	6	5	321:12	3	3	17	3.18	137	.876	0	0	0	0

^{†}Denotes player spent time with another team before joining the Sabres. Stats reflect time with the Sabres only.
^{‡}Denotes player was traded mid-season. Stats reflect time with the Sabres only.
Bold/italics denotes franchise record.

== Transactions ==
The Sabres have been involved in the following transactions during the 2025–26 season.

Key:

† Contract is entry-level.
‡ Contract initially takes effect in the 2026–27 season.

=== Trades ===
Date	Details		Ref
June 28, 2025	To Pittsburgh Penguins Connor Clifton; 2nd-round pick in 2025	To Buffalo Sabres Isaac Belliveau; Conor Timmins	
July 1, 2025	To Chicago Blackhawks Sam Lafferty	To Buffalo Sabres 6th-round pick in 2026	
January 24, 2026	To Carolina Hurricanes Viktor Neuchev	To Buffalo Sabres Gavin Bayreuther	
March 5, 2026	To Winnipeg Jets Jacob Bryson; Isak Rosen conditional BUF or EDM 4th-round pick in 2026^{1} 2nd-round pick in 2027	To Buffalo Sabres Luke Schenn*; Logan Stanley	
March 6, 2026	To New York Rangers 3rd-round pick in 2026; CHI 6th-round pick in 2026	To Buffalo Sabres Sam Carrick	
March 6, 2026	To Winnipeg Jets 7th-round pick in 2026	To Buffalo Sabres Tanner Pearson	

Notes

- Winnipeg will receive the higher of Buffalo's or Edmonton's 4th-round pick. Winnipeg also retains 50% of Schenn's contract

=== Players acquired ===
Date	Player	Former team	Term	Via	Ref
July 1, 2025	Justin Danforth	Columbus Blue Jackets	2-year	Free agency	
July 1, 2025	Mason Geertsen	Vegas Golden Knights	2-year	Free agency	
July 1, 2025	Alex Lyon	Detroit Red Wings	2-year	Free agency	
July 2, 2025	Riley Fiddler-Schultz	Rochester Americans	2-year‡	Free agency	
July 2, 2025	Zac Jones	New York Rangers	1-year	Free agency	
July 2, 2025	Zach Metsa	Rochester Americans	2-year	Free agency	
July 2, 2025	Carson Meyer	Rochester Americans	2-year	Free agency	
July 16, 2025	Jake Leschyshyn	New York Rangers	1-year	Free agency	
September 11, 2025	Alexandar Georgiev	San Jose Sharks	1-year	Free agency	
October 6, 2025	Colten Ellis	St. Louis Blues		Waivers	

=== Players lost ===
Date	Player	New team	Term	Via	Ref
July 1, 2025	Jacob Bernard-Docker	Detroit Red Wings	1-year	Free agency	
July 1, 2025	Kale Clague	Winnipeg Jets	1-year	Free agency	
July 24, 2025	Aleksandr Kisakov	HC Dynamo Moscow (KHL)		Free agency	
September 24, 2025	Felix Sandstrom	Oulun Kärpät (Liiga)		Free agency	
November 24, 2025	Alexandar Georgiev			Contract termination	
January 12, 2026	James Reimer	Ottawa Senators	1-year	Free agency	

=== Signings ===
Date	Player	Term	Ref
June 27, 2025	Jack Quinn	2-year	
July 1, 2025	Ryan Johnson	3-year	
July 1, 2025	Tyson Kozak	3-year	
July 1, 2025	Ryan McLeod	4-year	
July 1, 2025	Jack Rathbone	2-year	
July 14, 2025	Bowen Byram	2-year	
July 15, 2025	Radim Mrtka	3-year†	
July 27, 2025	Conor Timmins	2-year	
July 31, 2025	Devon Levi	2-year	
January 21, 2026	Josh Doan	7-year	

==== Key ====
† Contract is entry-level.

== Draft picks ==
Below are the Buffalo Sabres' selections at the 2025 NHL entry draft, which was held on June 27 and 28, 2025, at the Peacock Theater in Los Angeles.

Round	#	Player	Pos	Nationality	Team (league)
1	9	Radim Mrtka	D	Czechia	Seattle Thunderbirds (WHL)
3	71	David Bedkowski	D	Canada	Owen Sound Attack (OHL)
4	103	Matous Kurcharcik	C	Czechia	HC Slavia Praha U20 (Czechia U20)
4	116 (Note: The Minnesota Wild's fourth-round pick went to the Buffalo Sabres as the result of a trade on August 18, 2023, that sent Ilya Lyubushkin to Anaheim in exchange for this pick.)	Samuel Meloche	G	Canada	Rouyn-Noranda Huskies (QMJHL)
5	135	Noah Laberge	D	Canada	Acadie–Bathurst Titan (QMJHL)
6	167	Ashton Schultz	C	United States	Chicago Steel (USHL)
7	195 (Note: The Nashville Predators' seventh-round pick went to the Buffalo Sabres as the result of a trade on March 3, 2023, that sent Rasmus Asplund to Nashville in exchange for this pick.)	Melvin Novotny	LW	Sweden	Muskegon Lumberjacks (USHL)
7	199	Yevgeni Prokhorov	G	Belarus	Dinamo-Shinnik Bobruysk (MHL)
7	219 (Note: The Washington Capitals' seventh-round pick went to the Buffalo Sabres as the result of a trade on March 8, 2024, that sent Devin Cooley to San Jose in exchange for this pick.)	Ryan Rucinski	C	United States	Youngstown Phantoms (USHL)
