= 2025–26 Anaheim Ducks season =

National Hockey League season

2025–26 Anaheim Ducks
- Division: 3rd Pacific
- Conference: 7th Western
- 2025–26 record: 43–33–6
- Home record: 24–13–4
- Road record: 19–20–2
- Goals for: 273
- Goals against: 288

Team information
- General manager: Pat Verbeek
- Coach: Joel Quenneville
- Captain: Radko Gudas
- Alternate captains: Leo Carlsson; Alex Killorn; Jackson LaCombe; Mason McTavish; Ryan Strome (Oct.–Mar.)
- Arena: Honda Center
- Minor league affiliates: San Diego Gulls (AHL); Tulsa Oilers (ECHL)

Team leaders
- Goals: Cutter Gauthier (41)
- Assists: Jackson LaCombe (48)
- Points: Cutter Gauthier (69)
- Penalty minutes: Ross Johnston (107)
- Plus/minus: Troy Terry (+11)
- Wins: Lukas Dostal (30)
- Goals against average: Lukas Dostal (3.10)

The 2025–26 Anaheim Ducks season was the 33rd season of operation, and the 32nd season of play, for the National Hockey League (NHL) franchise that was established on June 15, 1993.

This is the first season under head coach Joel Quenneville, and three new assistant coaches.

On April 13, 2026, the Ducks qualified for the playoffs for the first time since the 2017–18 season following the San Jose Sharks defeating the Nashville Predators. In the first round, they defeated the two-time defending Western Conference champion Edmonton Oilers in six games before losing to the Vegas Golden Knights in the second round, also in six games.

== Off-season ==
=== Coaching staff ===
On April 19, 2025, it was announced that Anaheim head coach Greg Cronin would not return after two seasons and a record of 62–87–15. On May 8, the team announced Joel Quenneville would fill the role. Quenneville was a coach with the St. Louis Blues from 1996 to 2004, taking the Blues to seven playoff appearances with the best being in 2001. He would next coach the Colorado Avalanche from 2005 to 2008 taking the Colorado to two playoff appearances, losing in the conference semifinals in both 2006 to Anaheim, and 2008 to Detroit. He next would coach the Chicago Blackhawks from 2008 to 2019 taking the Blackhawks to nine playoff appearances and winning three Stanley Cups in 2010 against Philadelphia, 2013 against Boston and 2015 against Tampa Bay. He would last coach the Florida Panthers from 2019 to 2022 taking the Panthers to two straight playoff appearances in 2020 and 2021, before being resigned of his coaching duties as a result of the fallout from the 2010 Chicago Blackhawks sexual assault scandal on October 28, 2021.

On July 1, 2025, the team announced the hiring of three new assistant coaches, Jay Woodcroft, Ryan McGill, and Andrew Brewer. Woodcroft, the former head coach of the division rival Edmonton Oilers posted a 79–41–13 record between 2022 and 2024 seasons. Under Woodcroft, Edmonton went to the playoffs twice and made one conference finals appearance. McGill was an assistant with the New Jersey Devils and Vegas Golden Knights, while Brewer is a former AHL assistant who also held the role as video coach under Quenneville in 2020–21.

== Standings ==
=== Divisional standings ===
Pacific Division
Pos	Team	GP	W	L	OTL	RW	GF	GA	GD	Pts
1	y – Vegas Golden Knights	82	39	26	17	30	265	250	+15	95
2	x – Edmonton Oilers	82	41	30	11	32	282	269	+13	93
3	x – Anaheim Ducks	82	43	33	6	26	273	288	−15	92
4	x – Los Angeles Kings	82	35	27	20	22	225	247	−22	90
5	San Jose Sharks	82	39	35	8	27	251	292	−41	86
6	Seattle Kraken	82	34	37	11	26	226	263	−37	79
7	Calgary Flames	82	34	39	9	27	212	259	−47	77
8	Vancouver Canucks	82	25	49	8	15	216	316	−100	58

Source: National Hockey League
Rules for classification: 1) Fewer number of games played (GP, only during regular season); 2) Greater number of regulation wins (RW); 3) Greater number of wins in regulation and overtime, excluding shootout wins (ROW); 4) Greater number of total wins, including shootouts (W); 5) Greater number of points earned in head-to-head play; if teams played an uneven number of head-to-head games, the result of the first game on the home ice of the team with the extra home game is discarded; 6) Greater goal differential (GD); 7) Greater number of goals scored (GF)
x – Clinched playoff spot; y – Clinched division

=== Conference standings ===
Western Conference Wild Card
Pos	Div	Team	GP	W	L	OTL	RW	GF	GA	GD	Pts
1	CE	x – Utah Mammoth	82	43	33	6	33	268	240	+28	92
2	PA	x – Los Angeles Kings	82	35	27	20	22	225	247	−22	90
3	CE	St. Louis Blues	82	37	33	12	33	231	258	−27	86
4	CE	Nashville Predators	82	38	34	10	28	247	269	−22	86
5	PA	San Jose Sharks	82	39	35	8	27	251	292	−41	86
6	CE	Winnipeg Jets	82	35	35	12	28	231	260	−29	82
7	PA	Seattle Kraken	82	34	37	11	26	226	263	−37	79
8	PA	Calgary Flames	82	34	39	9	27	212	259	−47	77
9	CE	Chicago Blackhawks	82	29	39	14	22	213	275	−62	72
10	PA	Vancouver Canucks	82	25	49	8	15	216	316	−100	58

Source: National Hockey League
Rules for classification: 1) Fewer number of games played (GP, only during regular season); 2) Greater number of regulation wins (RW); 3) Greater number of wins in regulation and overtime, excluding shootout wins (ROW); 4) Greater number of total wins, including shootouts (W); 5) Greater number of points earned in head-to-head play; if teams played an uneven number of head-to-head games, the result of the first game on the home ice of the team with the extra home game is discarded; 6) Greater goal differential (GD); 7) Greater number of goals scored (GF)
x – Clinched playoff spot

== Schedule and results ==
=== Preseason ===
The Anaheim Ducks preseason schedule was released on June 20, 2025.

2025 preseason game log: 4–2–1 (home: 2–1–0; road: 2–1–1)

#	Date	Visitor	Score	Home	OT	Decision	Location	Attendance	Record
1^{A}	September 21	Anaheim	1–3	Los Angeles		Husso (0–1–0)	Toyota Arena	9,533	0–1–0
2	September 22	Utah	1–6	Anaheim		Mrazek (1–0–0)	Honda Center	10,155	1–1–0
3	September 24	Los Angeles	3–0	Anaheim		Dostal (0–1–0)	Honda Center	11,517	1–2–0
4^{B}	September 27	Anaheim	5–3	Los Angeles		Mrazek (2–0–0)	Dignity Health Arena	--	2–2–0
5	September 29	San Jose	2–3	Anaheim		Husso (1–1–0)	Honda Center	11,777	3–2–0
6	October 1	Anaheim	5–2	San Jose		Clang (1–0–0)	SAP Center	10,487	4–2–0
7	October 4	Anaheim	4–5	Los Angeles	OT	Dostal (0–1–1)	Crypto.com Arena	11,151	4–2–1

Legend:

Win Loss OT/SO Loss ^{A} – Game played in Ontario, California ^{B} – Game played in Bakersfield, California

=== Regular season ===
The Anaheim Ducks regular season schedule was released on July 16, 2025

2025–26 game log: 43–33–6 (home: 24–13–4; road: 19–20–2), 92 points
October: 6–3–1 (home: 2–1–0; road: 4–2–1), 13 points

#	Date	Visitor	Score	Home	OT	Decision	Location	Attendance	Record	Points	Recap
1	October 9	Anaheim	1–3	Seattle		Dostal (0–1–0)	Climate Pledge Arena	17,161	0–1–0	0	
2	October 11	Anaheim	7–6	San Jose	OT	Mrazek (1–0–0)	SAP Center	17,435	1–1–0	2	
3	October 14	Pittsburgh	3–4	Anaheim		Dostal (1–1–0)	Honda Center	17,622	2–1–0	4	
4	October 16	Carolina	4–1	Anaheim		Dostal (1–2–0)	Honda Center	16,145	2–2–0	4	
5	October 19	Anaheim	1–2	Chicago	OT	Dostal (1–2–1)	United Center	16,262	2–2–1	5	
6	October 21	Anaheim	5–2	Nashville		Dostal (2–2–1)	Bridgestone Arena	17,159	3–2–1	7	
7	October 23	Anaheim	7–5	Boston		Mrazek (2–0–0)	TD Garden	17,850	4–2–1	9	
8	October 25	Anaheim	3–4	Tampa Bay		Dostal (2–3–1)	Benchmark International Arena	19,092	4–3–1	9	
9	October 28	Anaheim	3–2	Florida	SO	Dostal (3–3–1)	Amerant Bank Arena	19,274	5–3–1	11	
10	October 31	Detroit	2–5	Anaheim		Dostal (4–3–1)	Honda Center	13,195	6–3–1	13	

November: 9–6–0 (home: 7–2–0; road: 2–4–0), 18 points

#	Date	Visitor	Score	Home	OT	Decision	Location	Attendance	Record	Points	Recap
11	November 2	New Jersey	1–4	Anaheim		Dostal (5–3–1)	Honda Center	17,174	7–3–1	15	
12	November 4	Florida	3–7	Anaheim		Dostal (6–3–1)	Honda Center	14,514	8–3–1	17	
13	November 6	Anaheim	7–5	Dallas		Dostal (7–3–1)	American Airlines Center	18,532	9–3–1	19	
14	November 8	Anaheim	4–3	Vegas	OT	Mrazek (3–0–0)	T-Mobile Arena	17,977	10–3–1	21	
15	November 9	Winnipeg	1–4	Anaheim		Dostal (8–3–1)	Honda Center	15,286	11–3–1	23	
16	November 11	Anaheim	1–4	Colorado		Dostal (8–4–1)	Ball Arena	18,098	11–4–1	23	
17	November 13	Anaheim	3–6	Detroit		Dostal (8–5–1)	Little Caesars Arena	19,515	11–5–1	23	
18	November 15	Anaheim	0–2	Minnesota		Mrazek (3–1–0)	Grand Casino Arena	17,458	11–6–1	23	
19	November 17	Utah	2–3	Anaheim	OT	Dostal (9–5–1)	Honda Center	15,177	12–6–1	25	
20	November 19	Boston	3–4	Anaheim		Dostal (10–5–1)	Honda Center	14,067	13–6–1	27	
21	November 20	Ottawa	3–2	Anaheim		Mrazek (3–2–0)	Honda Center	14,564	13–7–1	27	
22	November 22	Vegas	3–4	Anaheim	OT	Dostal (11–5–1)	Honda Center	17,174	14–7–1	29	
23	November 26	Vancouver	5–4	Anaheim		Mrazek (3–3–0)	Honda Center	16,781	14–8–1	29	
24	November 28	Los Angeles	4–5	Anaheim	SO	Husso (1–0–0)	Honda Center	17,174	15–8–1	31	
25	November 30	Anaheim	3–5	Chicago		Husso (1–1–0)	United Center	19,912	15–9–1	31	

December: 6–7–2 (home: 3–4–1; road: 3–3–1), 14 points

#	Date	Visitor	Score	Home	OT	Decision	Location	Attendance	Record	Points	Recap
26	December 1	Anaheim	4–1	St. Louis		Husso (2–1–0)	Enterprise Center	16,229	16–9–1	33	
27	December 3	Utah	7–0	Anaheim		Husso (2–2–0)	Honda Center	12,547	16–10–1	33	
28	December 5	Washington	3–4	Anaheim	SO	Husso (3–2–0)	Honda Center	16,122	17–10–1	35	
29	December 7	Chicago	1–7	Anaheim		Husso (4–2–0)	Honda Center	15,511	18–10–1	37	
30	December 9	Anaheim	4–3	Pittsburgh	SO	Husso (5–2–0)	PPG Paints Arena	15,165	19–10–1	39	
31	December 11	Anaheim	2–5	NY Islanders		Husso (5–3–0)	UBS Arena	14,527	19–11–1	39	
32	December 13	Anaheim	1–4	New Jersey		Dostal (11–6–1)	Prudential Center	15,755	19–12–1	39	
33	December 15	Anaheim	4–1	NY Rangers		Dostal (12–6–1)	Madison Square Garden	18,006	20–12–1	41	
34	December 16	Anaheim	3–4	Columbus	OT	Husso (5–3–1)	Nationwide Arena	14,120	20–12–2	42	
35	December 19	Dallas	8–3	Anaheim		Dostal (12–7–1)	Honda Center	14,262	20–13–2	42	
36	December 20	Columbus	3–4	Anaheim		Dostal (13–7–1)	Honda Center	15,897	21–13–2	44	
37	December 22	Seattle	3–1	Anaheim		Dostal (13–8–1)	Honda Center	16,214	21–14–2	44	
38	December 27	Anaheim	1–6	Los Angeles		Dostal (13–9–1)	Crypto.com Arena	18,145	21–15–2	44	
39	December 29	San Jose	5–4	Anaheim		Mrazek (3–4–0)	Honda Center	16,214	21–16–2	44	
40	December 31	Tampa Bay	4–3	Anaheim	OT	Dostal (13–9–2)	Honda Center	16,214	21–16–3	45	

January: 7–7–0 (home: 3–1–0; road: 4–6–0), 14 points

#	Date	Visitor	Score	Home	OT	Decision	Location	Attendance	Record	Points	Recap
41	January 2	Minnesota	5–2	Anaheim		Dostal (13–10–2)	Honda Center	16,214	21–17–3	45	
42	January 5	Anaheim	4–7	Washington		Mrazek (3–5–0)	Capital One Arena	17,560	21–18–3	45	
43	January 6	Anaheim	2–5	Philadelphia		Dostal (13–11–2)	Xfinity Mobile Arena	19,415	21–19–3	45	
44	January 8	Anaheim	2–5	Carolina		Husso (5–4–1)	Lenovo Center	18,299	21–20–3	45	
45	January 10	Anaheim	3–5	Buffalo		Dostal (13–12–2)	KeyBank Center	19,070	21–21–3	45	
46	January 13	Dallas	1–3	Anaheim		Dostal (14–12–2)	Honda Center	16,214	22–21–3	47	
47	January 16	Anaheim	3–2	Los Angeles	SO	Dostal (15–12–2)	Crypto.com Arena	18,145	23–21–3	49	
48	January 17	Los Angeles	1–2	Anaheim	OT	Husso (6–4–1)	Honda Center	16,214	24–21–3	51	
49	January 19	NY Rangers	3–5	Anaheim		Dostal (16–12–2)	Honda Center	16,214	25–21–3	53	
50	January 21	Anaheim	2–1	Colorado	SO	Dostal (17–12–2)	Ball Arena	18,109	26–21–3	55	
51	January 23	Anaheim	4–2	Seattle		Dostal (18–12–2)	Climate Pledge Arena	17,151	27–21–3	57	
52	January 25	Anaheim	4–3	Calgary	OT	Dostal (19–12–2)	Scotiabank Saddledome	16,444	28–21–3	59	
53	January 26	Anaheim	4–7	Edmonton		Husso (6–5–1)	Rogers Place	18,347	28–22–3	59	
54	January 29	Anaheim	0–2	Vancouver		Dostal (19–13–2)	Rogers Arena	18,774	28–23–3	59	

February: 4–0–0 (home: 4–0–0; road: 0–0–0), 8 points

#	Date	Visitor	Score	Home	OT	Decision	Location	Attendance	Record	Points	Recap
55	February 1	Vegas	3–4	Anaheim		Dostal (20–13–2)	Honda Center	16,214	29–23–3	61	
56	February 3	Seattle	2–4	Anaheim		Dostal (21–13–2)	Honda Center	16,214	30–23–3	63	
February 6–22		2026 Winter Olympics									
57	February 25	Edmonton	5–6	Anaheim		Dostal (22–13–2)	Honda Center	16,214	31–23–3	65	
58	February 27	Winnipeg	4–5	Anaheim	OT	Dostal (23–13–2)	Honda Center	16,210	32–23–3	67	

March: 9–5–2 (home: 4–2–2; road: 5–3–0), 20 points

#	Date	Visitor	Score	Home	OT	Decision	Location	Attendance	Record	Points	Recap
59	March 1	Calgary	2–3	Anaheim	SO	Dostal (24–13–2)	Honda Center	16,214	33–23–3	69	
60	March 3	Colorado	5–1	Anaheim		Dostal (24–14–2)	Honda Center	14,369	33–24–3	69	
61	March 4	NY Islanders	1–5	Anaheim		Husso (7–5–1)	Honda Center	14,196	34–24–3	71	
62	March 6	Montreal	5–6	Anaheim	SO	Dostal (25–14–2)	Honda Center	14,470	35–24–3	73	
63	March 8	St. Louis	4–0	Anaheim		Husso (7–6–1)	Honda Center	16,214	35–25–3	73	
64	March 10	Anaheim	4–1	Winnipeg		Dostal (26–14–2)	Canada Life Centre	13,249	36–25–3	75	
65	March 12	Anaheim	4–6	Toronto		Dostal (26–15–2)	Scotiabank Arena	18,456	36–26–3	75	
66	March 14	Anaheim	0–2	Ottawa		Husso (7–7–1)	Canadian Tire Centre	18,381	36–27–3	75	
67	March 15	Anaheim	4–3	Montreal		Dostal (27–15–2)	Bell Centre	20,962	37–27–3	77	
68	March 18	Philadelphia	3–2	Anaheim	OT	Dostal (27–15–3)	Honda Center	16,214	37–27–4	78	
69	March 20	Anaheim	4–1	Utah		Dostal (28–15–3)	Delta Center	12,478	38–27–4	80	
70	March 22	Buffalo	5–6	Anaheim	OT	Husso (8–7–1)	Honda Center	16,817	39–27–4	82	
71	March 24	Anaheim	5–3	Vancouver		Dostal (29–15–3)	Rogers Arena	18,001	40–27–4	84	
72	March 26	Anaheim	3–2	Calgary	OT	Husso (9–7–1)	Scotiabank Saddledome	17,047	41–27–4	86	
73	March 28	Anaheim	2–4	Edmonton		Dostal (29–16–3)	Rogers Place	18,347	41–28–4	86	
74	March 30	Toronto	5–4	Anaheim	OT	Husso (9–7–2)	Honda Center	15,375	41–28–5	87	

April: 2–5–1 (home: 1–3–1; road: 1–2–0), 5 points

#	Date	Visitor	Score	Home	OT	Decision	Location	Attendance	Record	Points	Recap
75	April 1	Anaheim	3–4	San Jose		Dostal (29–17–3)	SAP Center	17,435	41–29–5	87	
76	April 3	St. Louis	6–2	Anaheim		Dostal (29–18–3)	Honda Center	14,010	41–30–5	87	
77	April 4	Calgary	5–3	Anaheim		Husso (9–8–2)	Honda Center	14,104	41–31–5	87	
78	April 7	Nashville	5–0	Anaheim		Dostal (29–19–3)	Honda Center	15,556	41–32–5	87	
79	April 9	San Jose	1–6	Anaheim		Dostal (30–19–3)	Honda Center	16,628	42–32–5	89	
80	April 12	Vancouver	4–3	Anaheim	OT	Dostal (30–19–4)	Honda Center	16,731	42–32–6	90	
81	April 14	Anaheim	2–3	Minnesota		Dostal (30–20–4)	Grand Casino Arena	19,008	42–33–6	90	
82	April 16	Anaheim	5–4	Nashville		Husso (10–8–2)	Bridgestone Arena	17,332	43–33–6	92	

Legend: Win Loss OT/SO Loss

=== Playoffs ===
2026 Stanley Cup playoffs
Western Conference first round vs. (P2) Edmonton Oilers: Anaheim won 4–2

#	Date	Visitor	Score	Home	OT	Decision	Attendance	Location	Series	Recap
1	April 20	Anaheim	3–4	Edmonton		Dostal	18,347	Rogers Place	0–1	
2	April 22	Anaheim	6–4	Edmonton		Dostal	18,347	Rogers Place	1–1	
3	April 24	Edmonton	4–7	Anaheim		Dostal	16,735	Honda Center	2–1	
4	April 26	Edmonton	3–4	Anaheim	OT	Dostal	16,816	Honda Center	3–1	
5	April 28	Anaheim	1–4	Edmonton		Dostal	18,347	Rogers Place	3–2	
6	April 30	Edmonton	2–5	Anaheim		Dostal	16,820	Honda Center	4–2	

Western Conference second round vs (P1) Vegas Golden Knights: Vegas won 4–2

#	Date	Visitor	Score	Home	OT	Decision	Attendance	Location	Series	Recap
1	May 4	Anaheim	1–3	Vegas		Dostal	17,838	T-Mobile Arena	0–1	
2	May 6	Anaheim	3–1	Vegas		Dostal	18,018	T-Mobile Arena	1–1	
3	May 8	Vegas	6–2	Anaheim		Dostal	16,826	Honda Center	1–2	
4	May 10	Vegas	3–4	Anaheim		Dostal	16,800	Honda Center	2–2	
5	May 12	Anaheim	2–3	Vegas	OT	Dostal	18,089	T-Mobile Arena	2–3	
6	May 14	Vegas	5–1	Anaheim		Dostal	16,778	Honda Center	2–4	

Legend: Win Loss

== Player statistics ==
As of May 14, 2026

=== Skaters ===
Regular season
Player	GP	G	A	Pts	+/−	PIM
Cutter Gauthier	76	41	28	69	−2	28
Leo Carlsson	70	29	38	67	+4	33
Beckett Sennecke	82	23	37	60	−12	62
Jackson LaCombe	82	10	48	58	−2	19
Troy Terry	61	19	38	57	+11	14
Chris Kreider	75	22	28	50	−4	34
Mikael Granlund	58	19	22	41	−9	18
Mason McTavish	75	17	24	41	−15	42
Ryan Poehling	75	11	25	36	+8	12
Jacob Trouba	81	10	25	35	−1	31
Alex Killorn	82	15	18	33	−2	40
Pavel Mintyukov	73	8	14	22	−3	17
Olen Zellweger	76	7	15	22	+4	34
Drew Helleson	60	2	13	15	−4	20
John Carlson^{†}	16	4	10	14	−2	6
Ross Johnston	62	3	11	14	0	107
Radko Gudas	56	2	11	13	−2	67
Ian Moore	67	4	8	12	−14	24
Jeffrey Viel^{†}	35	3	7	10	−2	49
Frank Vatrano	50	5	4	9	−15	40
Ryan Strome^{‡}	33	3	6	9	−5	27
Nikita Nesterenko	29	1	8	9	−2	8
Jansen Harkins	44	3	5	8	−6	28
Tim Washe	39	2	3	5	−6	14
Sam Colangelo	9	1	0	1	−3	4
Tristan Luneau	1	1	0	1	+2	0
Tyson Hinds	6	0	0	0	+1	2
Nathan Gaucher	3	0	0	0	−1	0

Playoffs
Player	GP	G	A	Pts	+/−	PIM
Cutter Gauthier	12	4	8	12	−3	4
Leo Carlsson	12	4	7	11	+1	0
Troy Terry	12	3	8	11	+1	0
Mikael Granlund	12	5	5	10	−3	4
Jackson LaCombe	12	1	9	10	0	4
Alex Killorn	12	4	5	9	−10	8
Chris Kreider	12	2	5	7	0	0
Beckett Sennecke	12	5	1	6	−7	4
Mason McTavish	10	1	5	6	+1	2
John Carlson	12	0	6	6	−5	4
Ryan Poehling	11	4	1	5	−1	4
Jeffrey Viel	12	2	2	4	+1	17
Olen Zellweger	3	1	1	2	+2	0
Jansen Harkins	3	1	0	1	0	0
Ian Moore	10	1	0	1	−1	2
Jacob Trouba	12	1	0	1	+1	4
Drew Helleson	8	0	1	1	+1	2
Tyson Hinds	9	0	1	1	−1	0
Tim Washe	12	0	1	1	−2	4
Radko Gudas	1	0	0	0	−1	0
Ross Johnston	5	0	0	0	−2	4
Pavel Mintyukov	12	0	0	0	−5	4

=== Goaltenders ===
Regular season
Player	GP	GS	TOI	W	L	OT	GA	GAA	SA	SV%	SO	G	A	PIM
Lukas Dostal	56	55	3267:56	30	20	4	169	3.10	1513	.888	0	0	1	8
Ville Husso	20	19	1145:38	10	8	2	62	3.25	534	.884	0	0	0	2
Petr Mrazek	10	8	515:53	3	5	0	35	4.07	247	.858	0	0	0	0
Vyacheslav Buteyets	1	0	20:00	0	0	0	3	9.00	13	.769	0	0	0	0

Playoffs
Player	GP	GS	TOI	W	L	GA	GAA	SA	SV%	SO	G	A	PIM
Lukas Dostal	12	12	627:44	6	6	37	3.54	284	.870	0	0	0	0
Ville Husso	2	0	85:03	0	0	3	2.12	30	.900	0	0	0	2

^{†}Denotes player spent time with another team before joining the Ducks. Stats reflect time with the Ducks only.
^{‡}Denotes player was traded mid-season. Stats reflect time with the Ducks only.
Bold/italics denotes franchise record.

== Transactions ==
The Ducks have been involved in the following transactions during the 2025–26 season.

=== Key ===
† Entry-Level Contract
‡ Contract initially takes effect in the 2026–27 season

=== Trades ===
Date	Details		Ref
January 16, 2026	To Boston Bruins conditional (Note: Boston will receive the earlier of Detroit or Philadelphia's fourth-round picks in 2026.) DET 4th-round pick in 2026 or PHI 4th-round pick in 2026	To Anaheim Ducks Jeffrey Viel	
March 6, 2026	To Washington Capitals Conditional 1st-round pick in 2026; 3rd-round pick in 2027	To Anaheim Ducks John Carlson	
March 6, 2026	To Calgary Flames Ryan Strome	To Anaheim Ducks 7th-round pick in 2027	
June 26, 2026	To Buffalo Sabres Olen Zellweger	To Anaheim Ducks Anton Wahlberg; 2nd-round pick in 2026	
June 27, 2026	To St. Louis Blues Mason McTavish	To Anaheim Ducks 1st-round pick in 2026; 1st-round pick in 2026	
June 27, 2026	To Carolina Hurricanes John Carlson	To Anaheim Ducks Kyle Masters; 6th-round pick in 2026	
June 29, 2026	To Florida Panthers Radko Gudas	To Anaheim Ducks A. J. Greer	
June 30, 2026	To Carolina Hurricanes Kyle Masters	To Anaheim Ducks Noah Philp	

=== Players acquired ===
Date	Player	Former team	Term	Via	Ref
July 1, 2025	Mikael Granlund	Dallas Stars	3-year	Free agency	

=== Players lost ===
Date	Player	New team	Term	Via	Ref
July 1, 2025	Judd Caulfield	San Diego Gulls (AHL)	1-year	Free agency	
July 1, 2025	Isac Lundestrom	Columbus Blue Jackets	2-year	Free agency	
July 1, 2025	Carson Meyer	Buffalo Sabres	2-year	Free agency	
July 14, 2025	Justin Bailey	San Diego Gulls (AHL)	1-year	Free agency	
September 9, 2025	Rodwin Dionicio	EHC Biel (NL)	2-year	Free agency	
October 1, 2025	Oscar Dansk	Rytíři Kladno (ELH)	1-year	Free agency	
October 16, 2025	Josh Lopina	Savannah Ghost Pirates (ECHL)	1-year	Free agency	
October 18, 2025	Oliver Kylington	Djurgårdens IF (SHL)	1-year	Free agency	
October 27, 2025	Brett Leason	Washington Capitals	1-year	Free agency	
December 10, 2025	Robby Fabbri	St. Louis Blues	1-year	Free agency	
June 14, 2026	Calle Clang	Rögle BK (SHL)	2-year	Free agency	
June 16, 2026	Jan Myšák	HV71 (SHL)	2-year	Free agency	

=== Retirement ===
Date	Player	Ref

=== Signings ===
Date	Player	Term	Ref
July 15, 2025	Calle Clang	1-year	
July 15, 2025	Jan Mysak	1-year	
July 17, 2025	Lukas Dostal	5-year	
July 18, 2025	Drew Helleson	2-year	
August 4, 2025	Sam Colangelo	2-year	
August 4, 2025	Tim Washe	2-year	
September 27, 2025	Mason McTavish	6-year	
October 2, 2025	Jackson LaCombe	8-year‡	
March 6, 2026	Ryan Poehling	4-year‡	
March 22, 2026	Herman Traff	3-year†‡	
April 18, 2026	Roger McQueen	3-year†‡	
April 21, 2026	Ethan Procyszyn	3-year†‡	
June 25, 2026	Ian Moore	2-year‡	
June 30, 2026	AJ Greer	4-year‡	

== Draft picks ==
Below are the Anaheim Ducks selections at the 2025 NHL entry draft, which was held on June 27 and 28, at the Peacock Theater in Los Angeles, California.

Round	#	Player	Pos	Nationality	College/Junior/Club team	League
1	10	Roger McQueen	C	Canada	Brandon Wheat Kings	WHL
2	45	Eric Nilson	C	Sweden	Djurgårdens IF J20	J20 Nationell
2	60	Lasse Boelius	D	Finland	HC Ässät Pori J20	U20 SM-sarja
3	72	Noah Read	C	Canada	London Knights	OHL
4	101	Drew Schock	D	United States	U.S. NTDP	USHL
4	104	Elijah Neuenschwander	G	Switzerland	HC Fribourg-Gottéron	National League
5	136	Alexis Mathieau	D	Canada	Baie-Comeau Drakkar	QMJHL
5	159	Émile Guité	LW	Canada	Chicoutimi Saguenéens	QMJHL
6	168	Anthony Allain-Samaké	D	Canada	Sioux City Musketeers	USHL
7	200	Brady Turko	RW	Canada	Brandon Wheat Kings	WHL
