= Vincent Iorio =

Canadian ice hockey player (born 2002)

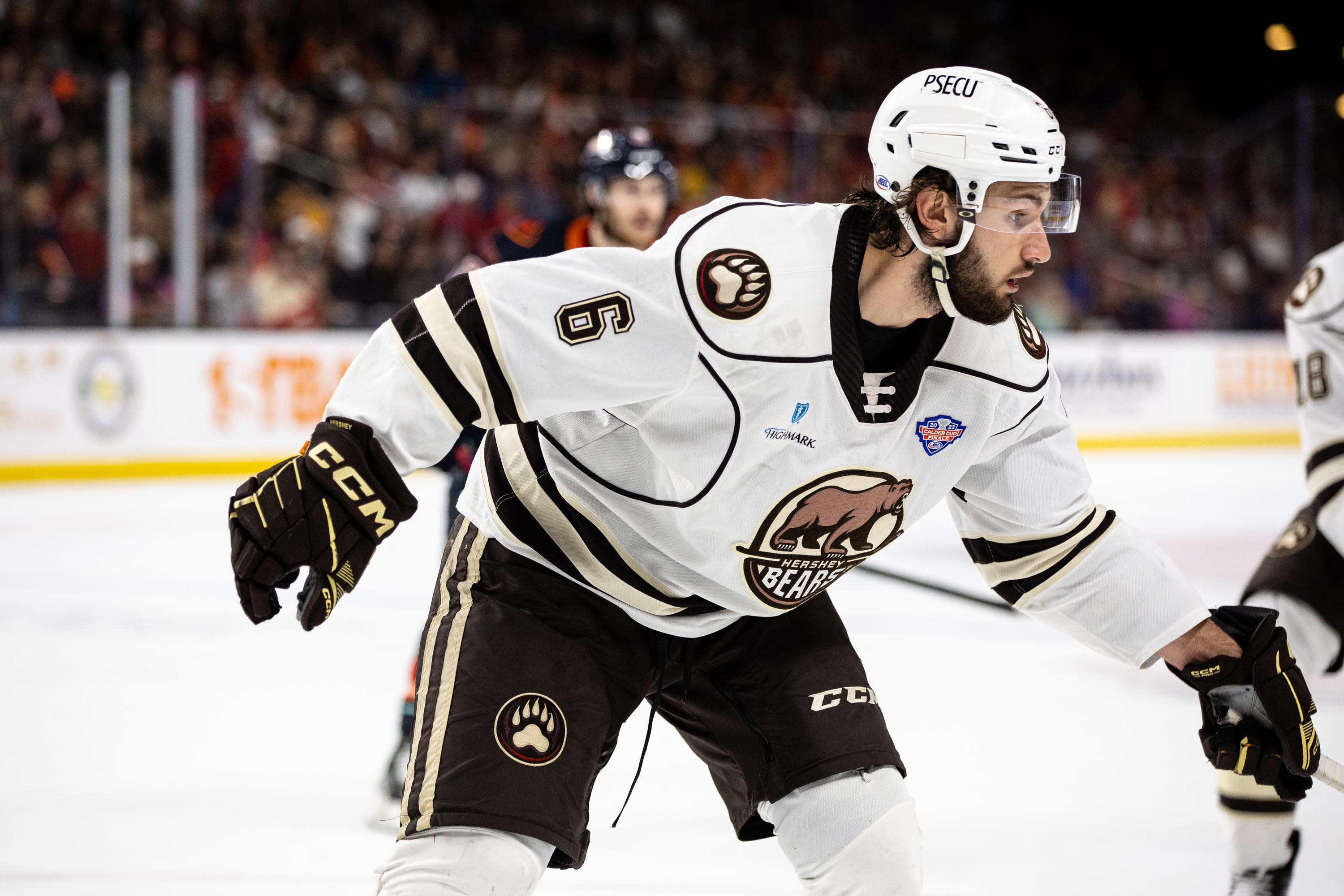
- Iorio with the Hershey Bears in 2023
- Born: November 14, 2002 (age 23) Coquitlam, British Columbia, Canada
- Height: 6 ft 4 in (193 cm)
- Weight: 210 lb (95 kg; 15 st 0 lb)
- Position: Defence
- Shoots: Right
- NHL team (P) Cur. team Former teams: New York Rangers; Hartford Wolf Pack (AHL); Washington Capitals; San Jose Sharks
- NHL draft: 55th overall, 2021; Washington Capitals
- Playing career: 2022–present

Vincent Iorio (born November 14, 2002) is a Canadian professional ice hockey player who is a defenceman for Hartford Wolf Pack of the American Hockey League as a prospect of the New York Rangers of the National Hockey League (NHL). Before playing professionally, Iorio spent four seasons with the Brandon Wheat Kings of the Western Hockey League (WHL).

== Early life ==
Iorio was born on November 14, 2002, in Coquitlam, British Columbia, to parents Mario and Jennifer. He grew up alongside his younger sister Olivia. Although he first played soccer, Iorio started playing ice hockey at around six years old. He began as a forward but was soon shifted to defence due to his ability to make plays with the puck.

== Playing career ==
=== Amateur ===
While growing up in Coquitlam, Iorio spent one season with the Burnaby Winter Club before enrolling at Shattuck-Saint Mary's in Minnesota for his bantam seasons. As he was expected to enrol in an American university following bantam, few Western Hockey League (WHL) teams were interested in drafting him. He was eventually selected in the second round, 27th overall, by the Brandon Wheat Kings in the 2017 WHL bantam draft. Iorio was also selected to represent Team British Columbia at the 2017 WHL Cup in Calgary. Iorio returned to Shattuck St. Mary's for the 2017–18 season before joining the Wheat Kings. He was also drafted 269th overall in the 2018 United States Hockey League (USHL) draft by the Green Bay Gamblers.

Due to his late birthday, Iorio began playing for the Wheat Kings at the age of 15 in his rookie season. He was the third-youngest player in the WHL at the start of the 2018–19 season. Iorio missed a few games after suffering an upper body injury during practice, and finished with five points over 50 regular season games. Iorio scored his first WHL goal on February 23, 2019, against the Prince Albert Raiders. He significantly improved offensively in his second season with the Wheat Kings, and finished with four goals and 17 assists through 59 games in the 2019–20 regular season. He was named the Wheat Kings' 2020 Most Sportsmanlike Player and the Maggie Janz Scholastic Player of the Year.

Due to the COVID-19 pandemic, the 2020–21 season was shortened from 68 to 24 games. Iorio recorded five goals and seven assists for 12 points through 22 games. Leading up to the 2021 NHL entry draft, Iorio was ranked 71st among all draft eligible North American skaters by the NHL Central Scouting Bureau. However, his place in the draft was not unanimous as he earned a higher ranking from Bob McKenzie of The Sports Network. Before the draft, Iorio was invited to Hockey Canada's national under-20 training camp. On July 24, Iorio was drafted in the second round, 55th overall, by the Washington Capitals.

Before the start of the 2021–22 season, Iorio was invited to the Capitals' rookie camp, and signed a three-year, entry-level contract with the team on October 4, 2021. Iorio set numerous personal bests upon rejoining the Wheat Kings, including a career-high 11 goals and 33 assists.

=== Professional ===
Iorio was reassigned to the Capitals' American Hockey League (AHL) affiliate, the Hershey Bears, on May 4, 2022, for the remainder of the 2021–22 season. He appeared in 53 games with the Hershey Bears before being called up to the Capitals on March 3, 2023. Iorio subsequently made his NHL debut the following night against the San Jose Sharks and recorded his first NHL point, an assist, while skating 14:48 of ice time.

Iorio made his NHL playoffs' debut in game 1 of the 2024 Stanley Cup playoffs against the New York Rangers. However, he was injured in the second period and was forced to leave the game. Iorio missed over a month of playing to recover before rejoining the Hershey Bears for the second round of the Calder Cup playoffs.

At the start of the 2025–26 season, on October 16, 2025, Iorio was waived by the Capitals and subsequently claimed by the San Jose Sharks. He made his Sharks' debut the next day against the Utah Mammoth. Iorio made 21 appearances with the Sharks, collecting three assists, before he was returned to waivers and claimed by the New York Rangers on January 31, 2026.

Prior to the start of the 2026-27 season he was assigned to the Hartford Wolf Pack, the Rangers' American Hockey League affiliate.

== Personal life ==
Iorio serves as a stunt double for Belmont Cameli in the 2026 Amazon Prime Video series Off Campus.

== Career statistics ==
			Regular season					Playoffs
Season	Team	League	GP	G	A	Pts	PIM	GP	G	A	Pts	PIM
2018–19	Brandon Wheat Kings	WHL	50	1	4	5	20	—	—	—	—	—
2019–20	Brandon Wheat Kings	WHL	59	4	17	21	31	—	—	—	—	—
2020–21	Brandon Wheat Kings	WHL	22	5	7	12	16	—	—	—	—	—
2021–22	Brandon Wheat Kings	WHL	60	11	33	44	49	6	1	1	2	0
2022–23	Hershey Bears	AHL	63	2	20	22	10	15	1	4	5	6
2022–23	Washington Capitals	NHL	3	0	1	1	0	—	—	—	—	—
2023–24	Hershey Bears	AHL	60	4	10	14	30	8	0	0	0	4
2023–24	Washington Capitals	NHL	6	0	0	0	0	1	0	0	0	0
2024–25	Hershey Bears	AHL	67	5	15	20	27	8	0	2	2	6
2025–26	San Jose Sharks	NHL	21	0	3	3	12	—	—	—	—	—
2025–26	San Jose Barracuda	AHL	6	0	7	7	4	—	—	—	—	—
2025–26	New York Rangers	NHL	6	0	0	0	0	—	—	—	—	—
NHL totals			36	0	4	4	12	1	0	0	0	0

== Awards and honours ==
Award	Year	Ref
AHL
Calder Cup	2023, 2024	
