= 2025–26 Minnesota Wild season =

National Hockey League season

2025–26 Minnesota Wild
- Division: 3rd Central
- Conference: 3rd Western
- 2025–26 record: 46–24–12
- Home record: 23–10–8
- Road record: 23–14–4
- Goals for: 262
- Goals against: 227

Team information
- General manager: Bill Guerin
- Coach: John Hynes
- Captain: Jared Spurgeon
- Alternate captains: Marcus Foligno; Kirill Kaprizov
- Arena: Grand Casino Arena
- Minor league affiliates: Iowa Wild (AHL); Iowa Heartlanders (ECHL)

Team leaders
- Goals: Kirill Kaprizov (45)
- Assists: Quinn Hughes (48)
- Points: Kirill Kaprizov (89)
- Penalty minutes: Jacob Middleton (74)
- Plus/minus: Marcus Johansson (+20)
- Wins: Filip Gustavsson (28)
- Goals against average: Jesper Wallstedt (2.63)

The 2025–26 Minnesota Wild season was the 26th season of operation (25th season of play) of the National Hockey League (NHL) franchise that was established on June 25, 1997.

On April 2, 2026, the Wild clinched their second consecutive playoff spot after a win against the Vancouver Canucks. In the playoffs, Minnesota Wild defeated the Dallas Stars in six games of the first round to advance to the second round for the first time since 2015. They would then lose to the Colorado Avalanche in five games in the second round, blowing a 3-0 lead in Game 5 to lose 4-3 in overtime to end their season.

== Standings ==
=== Divisional standings ===
Central Division
Pos	Team	GP	W	L	OTL	RW	GF	GA	GD	Pts
1	p – Colorado Avalanche	82	55	16	11	48	302	203	+99	121
2	x – Dallas Stars	82	50	20	12	38	279	226	+53	112
3	x – Minnesota Wild	82	46	24	12	31	272	240	+32	104
4	x – Utah Mammoth	82	43	33	6	33	268	240	+28	92
5	St. Louis Blues	82	37	33	12	33	231	258	−27	86
6	Nashville Predators	82	38	34	10	28	247	269	−22	86
7	Winnipeg Jets	82	35	35	12	28	231	260	−29	82
8	Chicago Blackhawks	82	29	39	14	21	213	275	−62	72

Source: National Hockey League
Rules for classification: 1) Fewer number of games played (GP, only during regular season); 2) Greater number of regulation wins (RW); 3) Greater number of wins in regulation and overtime, excluding shootout wins (ROW); 4) Greater number of total wins, including shootouts (W); 5) Greater number of points earned in head-to-head play; if teams played an uneven number of head-to-head games, the result of the first game on the home ice of the team with the extra home game is discarded; 6) Greater goal differential (GD); 7) Greater number of goals scored (GF)
p – Clinched Presidents' Trophy; x – Clinched playoff spot

=== Conference standings ===
Western Conference Wild Card
Pos	Div	Team	GP	W	L	OTL	RW	GF	GA	GD	Pts
1	CE	x – Utah Mammoth	82	43	33	6	33	268	240	+28	92
2	PA	x – Los Angeles Kings	82	35	27	20	22	225	247	−22	90
3	CE	St. Louis Blues	82	37	33	12	33	231	258	−27	86
4	CE	Nashville Predators	82	38	34	10	28	247	269	−22	86
5	PA	San Jose Sharks	82	39	35	8	27	251	292	−41	86
6	CE	Winnipeg Jets	82	35	35	12	28	231	260	−29	82
7	PA	Seattle Kraken	82	34	37	11	26	226	263	−37	79
8	PA	Calgary Flames	82	34	39	9	27	212	259	−47	77
9	CE	Chicago Blackhawks	82	29	39	14	22	213	275	−62	72
10	PA	Vancouver Canucks	82	25	49	8	15	216	316	−100	58

Source: National Hockey League
Rules for classification: 1) Fewer number of games played (GP, only during regular season); 2) Greater number of regulation wins (RW); 3) Greater number of wins in regulation and overtime, excluding shootout wins (ROW); 4) Greater number of total wins, including shootouts (W); 5) Greater number of points earned in head-to-head play; if teams played an uneven number of head-to-head games, the result of the first game on the home ice of the team with the extra home game is discarded; 6) Greater goal differential (GD); 7) Greater number of goals scored (GF)
x – Clinched playoff spot

== Schedule and results ==
=== Preseason ===
The preseason schedule was released on July 13, 2025.

2025–26 Minnesota Wild preseason
2025 preseason game log: 3–2–1 (Home: 1–2–0; Road: 2–0–1)

#	Date	Visitor	Score	Home	OT	Location	Attendance	Record	Recap
1	September 21	Minnesota	3–2	Winnipeg	OT	Canada Life Centre	14,481	1–0–0	
2	September 23	Minnesota	2–3	Dallas	OT	American Airlines Center	14,514	1–0–1	
3	September 25	Dallas	5–2	Minnesota		Grand Casino Arena	16,755	1–1–1	
4	September 28	Chicago	4–1	Minnesota		Grand Casino Arena	17,808	1–2–1	
5	September 30	Winnipeg	2–3	Minnesota		Grand Casino Arena	16,487	2–2–1	
6	October 3	Minnesota	3–2	Chicago		United Center	9,569	3–2–1	

Legend

Win Loss OT/SO Loss

=== Regular season ===
The regular season schedule was released on July 16, 2025.

2025–26 game log

October: 3–6–3 (Home: 1–3–2; Road: 2–3–1)
#	Date	Visitor	Score	Home	OT	Decision	Attendance	Record	Pts	Recap
1	October 9	Minnesota	5–0	St. Louis		Gustavsson	18,096	1–0–0	2
2	October 11	Columbus	7–4	Minnesota		Gustavsson	18,836	1–1–0	2
3	October 13	Los Angeles	3–4	Minnesota	SO	Wallstedt	17,102	2–1–0	4
4	October 14	Minnesota	2–5	Dallas		Gustavsson	18,532	2–2–0	4
5	October 17	Minnesota	1–5	Washington		Gustavsson	17,482	2–3–0	4
6	October 18	Minnesota	1–2	Philadelphia	OT	Wallstedt	17,011	2–3–1	5
7	October 20	Minnesota	3–1	NY Rangers		Gustavsson	18,006	3–3–1	7
8	October 22	Minnesota	1–4	New Jersey		Gustavsson	16,434	3–4–1	7
9	October 25	Utah	6–2	Minnesota		Gustavsson	18,088	3–5–1	7
10	October 26	San Jose	6–5	Minnesota	OT	Wallstedt	17,101	3–5–2	8
11	October 28	Winnipeg	4–3	Minnesota	OT	Gustavsson	16,102	3–5–3	9
12	October 30	Pittsburgh	4–1	Minnesota		Gustavsson	16,203	3–6–3	9

November: 11–1–2 (Home: 7–0–2; Road: 4–1–0)
#	Date	Visitor	Score	Home	OT	Decision	Attendance	Record	Pts	Recap
13	November 1	Vancouver	2–5	Minnesota		Gustavsson	17,216	4–6–3	11
14	November 4	Nashville	2–3	Minnesota	OT	Gustavsson	16,253	5–6–3	13
15	November 6	Minnesota	3–4	Carolina		Gustavsson	18,299	5–7–3	13
16	November 7	Minnesota	5–2	NY Islanders		Wallstedt	15,792	6–7–3	15
17	November 9	Calgary	0–2	Minnesota		Wallstedt	17,090	7–7–3	17
18	November 11	San Jose	2–1	Minnesota	OT	Gustavsson	16,253	7–7–4	18
19	November 15	Anaheim	0–2	Minnesota		Wallstedt	17,458	8–7–4	20
20	November 16	Vegas	2–3	Minnesota	OT	Gustavsson	17,439	9–7–4	22
21	November 19	Carolina	3–4	Minnesota	SO	Wallstedt	16,087	10–7–4	24
22	November 21	Minnesota	5–0	Pittsburgh		Gustavsson	17,527	11–7–4	26
23	November 23	Minnesota	3–0	Winnipeg		Wallstedt	14,368	12–7–4	28
24	November 26	Minnesota	4–3	Chicago	OT	Gustavsson	18,933	13–7–4	30
25	November 28	Colorado	2–3	Minnesota	SO	Wallstedt	19,044	14–7–4	32
26	November 29	Buffalo	3–2	Minnesota	SO	Gustavsson	17,233	14–7–5	33

December: 10–3–2 (Home: 5–1–1; Road: 5–2–1)
#	Date	Visitor	Score	Home	OT	Decision	Attendance	Record	Pts	Recap
27	December 2	Minnesota	1–0	Edmonton		Wallstedt	19,173	15–7–5	35
28	December 4	Minnesota	1–4	Calgary		Gustavsson	16,924	15–8–5	35
29	December 6	Minnesota	2–4	Vancouver		Wallstedt	18,629	15–9–5	35
30	December 8	Minnesota	4–1	Seattle		Gustavsson	17,151	16–9–5	37
31	December 11	Dallas	2–5	Minnesota		Gustavsson	17,109	17–9–5	39
32	December 13	Ottawa	2–3	Minnesota		Wallstedt	18,058	18–9–5	41
33	December 14	Boston	2–6	Minnesota		Gustavsson	18,322	19–9–5	43
34	December 16	Washington	0–5	Minnesota		Gustavsson	18,044	20–9–5	45
35	December 18	Minnesota	5–2	Columbus		Wallstedt	14,845	21–9–5	47
36	December 20	Edmonton	2–5	Minnesota		Gustavsson	19,025	22–9–5	49
37	December 21	Colorado	5–1	Minnesota		Wallstedt	19,146	22–10–5	49
38	December 23	Nashville	3–2	Minnesota	OT	Gustavsson	19,033	22–10–6	50
39	December 27	Minnesota	4–3	Winnipeg	OT	Wallstedt	15,225	23–10–6	52
40	December 29	Minnesota	5–2	Vegas		Gustavsson	18,102	24–10–6	54
41	December 31	Minnesota	3–4	San Jose	SO	Wallstedt	17,435	24–10–7	55

January: 8–4–3 (Home: 3–2–2; Road: 5–2–1)
#	Date	Visitor	Score	Home	OT	Decision	Attendance	Record	Pts	Recap
42	January 2	Minnesota	6–2	Anaheim		Gustavsson	16,214	25–10–7	57
43	January 3	Minnesota	4–5	Los Angeles	SO	Wallstedt	18,145	25–10–8	58
44	January 5	Minnesota	2–4	Los Angeles		Gustavsson	16,874	25–11–8	58
45	January 8	Minnesota	3–2	Seattle	OT	Wallstedt	17,151	26–11–8	60
46	January 10	NY Islanders	4–3	Minnesota	OT	Gustavsson	19,036	26–11–9	61
47	January 12	New Jersey	5–2	Minnesota		Wallstedt	18,747	26–12–9	61
48	January 15	Winnipeg	6–2	Minnesota		Wallstedt	18,275	26–13–9	61
49	January 17	Minnesota	5–4	Buffalo	OT	Gustavsson	19,070	27–13–9	63
50	January 19	Minnesota	6–3	Toronto		Gustavsson	18,742	28–13–9	65
51	January 20	Minnesota	3–4	Montreal		Wallstedt	21,962	28–14–9	65
52	January 22	Detroit	3–4	Minnesota	OT	Gustavsson	18,067	29–14–9	67
53	January 24	Florida	4–3	Minnesota	OT	Gustavsson	19,103	29–14–10	68
54	January 27	Chicago	3–4	Minnesota	SO	Wallstedt	18,011	30–14–10	70
55	January 29	Calgary	1–4	Minnesota		Gustavsson	17,278	31–14–10	72
56	January 31	Minnesota	7–3	Edmonton		Wallstedt	18,347	32–14–10	74

February: 3–1–0 (Home: 1–0–0; Road: 2–1–0)
#	Date	Visitor	Score	Home	OT	Decision	Attendance	Record	Pts	Recap
57	February 2	Montreal	3–4	Minnesota	OT	Gustavsson	18,228	33–14–10	76
58	February 4	Minnesota	6–5	Nashville	OT	Gustavsson	17,235	34–14–10	78
59	February 26	Minnesota	5–2	Colorado		Gustavsson	18,148	35–14–10	80
60	February 27	Minnesota	2–5	Utah		Wallstedt	12,478	35–15–10	80

March: 6–6–2 (Home: 3–4–1; Road: 3–2–1)
#	Date	Visitor	Score	Home	OT	Decision	Attendance	Record	Pts	Recap
61	March 1	St. Louis	3–1	Minnesota		Gustavsson	19,121	35–16–10	80
62	March 3	Tampa Bay	1–5	Minnesota		Gustavsson	18,101	36–16–10	82
63	March 6	Minnesota	4–2	Vegas		Gustavsson	18,116	37–16–10	84
64	March 8	Minnesota	2–3	Colorado	SO	Wallstedt	18,148	37–16–11	85
65	March 10	Utah	0–5	Minnesota		Gustavsson	18,078	38–16–11	87
66	March 12	Philadelphia	3–2	Minnesota	SO	Wallstedt	18,515	38–16–12	88
67	March 14	NY Rangers	4–2	Minnesota		Gustavsson	18,925	38–17–12	88
68	March 15	Toronto	4–2	Minnesota		Wallstedt	17,663	38–18–12	88
69	March 17	Minnesota	4–3	Chicago	OT	Gustavsson	20,668	39–18–12	90
70	March 19	Chicago	2–1	Minnesota		Wallstedt	19,086	39–19–12	90
71	March 21	Dallas	1–2	Minnesota	OT	Gustavsson	19,229	40–19–12	92
72	March 24	Minnesota	3–6	Tampa Bay		Gustavsson	19,092	40–20–12	92
73	March 26	Minnesota	3–2	Florida		Wallstedt	18,979	41–20–12	94
74	March 28	Minnesota	3–6	Boston		Gustavsson	17,850	41–21–12	94

April: 5–3–0 (Home: 3–0–0; Road: 2–3–0)
#	Date	Visitor	Score	Home	OT	Decision	Attendance	Record	Pts	Recap
75	April 2	Vancouver	2–5	Minnesota		Gustavsson	19,156	42–21–12	96
76	April 4	Minnesota	4–1	Ottawa		Wallstedt	18,482	43–21–12	98
77	April 5	Minnesota	5–4	Detroit		Gustavsson	17,892	44–21–12	100
78	April 7	Seattle	2–5	Minnesota		Wallstedt	19,089	45–21–12	102
79	April 9	Minnesota	4–5	Dallas		Gustavsson	18,532	45–22–12	102
80	April 11	Minnesota	1–2	Nashville		Wallstedt	17,761	45–23–12	102
81	April 13	Minnesota	3–6	St. Louis		Gustavsson	18,096	45–24–12	102
82	April 14	Anaheim	2–3	Minnesota		Wallstedt	19,008	46–24–12	104

Legend: Win (2 points) Loss (0 points) Overtime/shootout loss (1 point)

=== Playoffs ===
2026 Stanley Cup playoffs

Western Conference first round vs. (C2) Dallas Stars: Minnesota won 4–2
#	Date	Visitor	Score	Home	OT	Decision	Attendance	Series	Recap
1	April 18	Minnesota	6–1	Dallas		Wallstedt	18,532	1–0
2	April 20	Minnesota	2–4	Dallas		Wallstedt	18,532	1–1
3	April 22	Dallas	4–3	Minnesota	2OT	Wallstedt	19,244	1–2
4	April 25	Dallas	2–3	Minnesota	OT	Wallstedt	19,274	2–2
5	April 28	Minnesota	4–2	Dallas		Wallstedt	18,532	3–2
6	April 30	Dallas	2–5	Minnesota		Wallstedt	19,273	4–2

Western Conference second round vs (C1) Colorado Avalanche: Colorado won 4–1
#	Date	Visitor	Score	Home	OT	Decision	Attendance	Series	Recap
1	May 3	Minnesota	6–9	Colorado		Wallstedt	18,148	0–1
2	May 5	Minnesota	2–5	Colorado		Gustavsson	18,154	0–2
3	May 9	Colorado	1–5	Minnesota		Wallstedt	19,236	1–2
4	May 11	Colorado	5–2	Minnesota		Wallstedt	19,136	1–3
5	May 13	Minnesota	3–4	Colorado	OT	Wallstedt	18,159	1–4

Legend: Win Loss

== Player statistics ==
As of May 13, 2026

=== Skaters ===
Regular season
Player	GP	G	A	Pts	+/−	PIM
Kirill Kaprizov	78	45	44	89	+10	28
Matt Boldy	76	42	43	85	+18	30
Mats Zuccarello	59	15	39	54	−5	20
Quinn Hughes^{†}	48	5	48	53	+6	20
Joel Eriksson Ek	70	19	32	51	+16	32
Brock Faber	80	15	36	51	+18	39
Marcus Johansson	75	15	34	49	+18	12
Vladimir Tarasenko	75	23	24	47	−11	10
Ryan Hartman	76	23	20	43	−1	48
Danila Yurov	73	12	15	27	−7	28
Yakov Trenin	82	6	17	23	+13	38
Jared Spurgeon	79	6	16	22	+2	14
Jonas Brodin	62	4	14	18	+19	16
Jake Middleton	75	2	14	16	+2	76
Zeev Buium^{‡}	31	3	11	14	−9	8
Marcus Foligno	56	8	5	13	−12	67
Marco Rossi^{‡}	17	4	9	13	−6	2
Nico Sturm	49	5	6	11	0	16
Vinnie Hinostroza^{‡}	48	3	7	10	−8	15
Zach Bogosian	41	2	4	6	+8	18
Daemon Hunt	32	0	6	6	−3	6
Michael McCarron^{†}	20	3	2	5	−1	20
Bobby Brink^{†}	13	2	2	4	−2	4
Nick Foligno^{†}	17	1	3	4	0	17
Ben Jones	28	1	2	3	−10	0
Tyler Pitlick	32	2	0	2	−4	24
Hunter Haight	9	1	1	2	−5	4
Nicolas Aube-Kubel	6	0	2	2	+1	6
Robby Fabbri^{†}	6	1	0	1	−1	4
Jeff Petry^{†}	9	0	1	1	−5	2
Matt Kiersted	6	0	1	1	0	0
Carson Lambos	1	0	0	0	+1	0
David Jiricek^{‡}	25	0	0	0	0	14
Liam Ohgren^{‡}	18	0	0	0	−3	0
David Spacek	2	0	0	0	−1	0
Viking Gustafsson Nyberg	2	0	0	0	+1	0

Playoffs
Player	GP	G	A	Pts	+/−	PIM
Kirill Kaprizov	11	4	11	15	+10	2
Quinn Hughes	11	4	11	15	+10	4
Matt Boldy	11	7	6	13	+5	4
Brock Faber	11	4	6	10	+11	10
Mats Zuccarello	8	2	7	9	−3	2
Ryan Hartman	11	3	4	7	−2	18
Joel Eriksson Ek	6	3	2	5	+7	6
Vladimir Tarasenko	11	2	3	5	+2	2
Nico Sturm	8	1	4	5	0	0
Marcus Johansson	11	4	0	4	0	2
Michael McCarron	11	2	2	4	+2	0
Nick Foligno	11	2	1	3	+2	6
Marcus Foligno	11	2	1	3	+1	8
Danila Yurov	9	1	2	3	0	8
Yakov Trenin	9	0	2	2	+2	6
Jared Spurgeon	11	0	1	1	−2	4
Jonas Brodin	5	0	1	1	+2	4
Jake Middleton	11	0	1	1	−2	2
Bobby Brink	4	0	1	1	0	4
Daemon Hunt	5	0	1	1	+1	0
Jeff Petry	3	0	0	0	+1	0
Zach Bogosian	9	0	0	0	−2	4

=== Goaltenders ===
Regular season
Player	GP	GS	TOI	W	L	OT	GA	GAA	SA	SV%	SO	G	A	PIM
Filip Gustavsson	50	49	2967:55	28	15	6	133	2.69	1377	.904	4	0	2	0
Jesper Wallstedt	35	33	1996:39	18	9	6	87	2.61	1020	.916	4	0	1	2

Playoffs
Player	GP	GS	TOI	W	L	GA	GAA	SA	SV%	SO	G	A	PIM
Jesper Wallstedt	10	10	650:55	5	5	30	2.77	329	.909	0	0	0	0
Filip Gustavsson	1	1	57:08	0	1	4	4.20	22	.818	0	0	0	0

^{†}Denotes player spent time with another team before joining the Wild. Stats reflect time with the Wild only.
^{‡}Denotes player was traded mid-season. Stats reflect time with the Wild only.
Bold/italics denotes franchise record.

== Transactions ==
The Wild have been involved in the following transactions during the 2025–26 season.

Key:

† Contract is entry-level.
‡ Contract initially takes effect in the 2026–27 season.

=== Trades ===
Date	Details		Ref
June 26, 2025	To Seattle Kraken Frederick Gaudreau	To Minnesota Wild 4th-round pick in 2025	
June 26, 2025	To Columbus Blue Jackets Brendan Gaunce	To Minnesota Wild Cameron Butler	
December 12, 2025	To Vancouver Canucks Zeev Buium; Liam Ohgren; Marco Rossi; 1st-round pick in 2026	To Minnesota Wild Quinn Hughes	
March 1, 2026	To Philadelphia Flyers Roman Schmidt	To Minnesota Wild Boris Katchouk	
March 3, 2026	To Nashville Predators 2nd-round pick in 2028	To Minnesota Wild Michael McCarron	
March 5, 2026	To Florida Panthers conditional 5th-round pick in 2026 or 7th-round pick in 2026	To Minnesota Wild Jeff Petry	
March 6, 2026	To Chicago Blackhawks Future Considerations	To Minnesota Wild Nick Foligno	
March 6, 2026	To Florida Panthers Vinnie Hinostroza	To Minnesota Wild Future considerations	
March 6, 2026	To Philadelphia Flyers David Jiricek	To Minnesota Wild Bobby Brink	

=== Players acquired ===
Date	Player	Former team	Term	Via	Ref
July 1, 2025	Nico Sturm	Florida Panthers	2-year	Free agency	
July 2, 2025	Nicolas Aube-Kubel	New York Rangers	1-year	Free agency	
July 2, 2025	Ben Gleason	Philadelphia Flyers	1-year	Free agency	
July 2, 2025	Matt Kiersted	Florida Panthers	2-year	Free agency	
July 2, 2025	Cal Petersen	Philadelphia Flyers	1-year	Free agency	
July 2, 2025	Tyler Pitlick	Boston Bruins	2-year	Free agency	
March 2, 2026	Robby Fabbri	St. Louis Blues	Waivers		

=== Players lost ===
Date	Player	New team	Term	Via	Ref
July 1, 2025	Travis Boyd	Toronto Maple Leafs	1-year	Free agency	
July 1, 2025	Justin Brazeau	Pittsburgh Penguins	2-year	Free agency	
July 2, 2025	Graeme Clarke	Washington Capitals	1-year	Free agency	
July 2, 2025	Gustav Nyquist	Winnipeg Jets	1-year	Free agency	
August 25, 2025	Cameron Crotty	Ottawa Senators	2-year	Free agency	

=== Signings ===
Date	Player	Term	Ref
June 2, 2025	Marcus Johansson	1-year	
August 22, 2025	Marco Rossi	3-year	
September 30, 2025	Kirill Kaprizov	8-year‡	
October 4, 2025	Filip Gustavsson	5-year‡	

== Milestones ==
Regular season
Player	Milestone	Reached
Marcus Foligno	900th NHL game played	December 18, 2025
Marcus Johansson	1000th NHL game played	November 9, 2025
Jared Spurgeon	1000th NHL game played	March 13, 2026

== Draft picks ==
Below are the Minnesota Wild selections at the 2025 NHL entry draft, which was held on June 27 and 28, 2025, at the Peacock Theater in Los Angeles.

Round	#	Player	Pos	Nationality	College/Junior/Club team (League)
2	52	Theodor Hallquisth	D	Sweden	Örebro HK J20 (J20 Nationell)
4	102	Adam Benak	C	Czech Republic	Youngstown Phantoms (USHL)
4	121	Lirim Amidovski	RW	Canada	North Bay Battalion (OHL)
4	123	Carter Klippenstein	C	Canada	Brandon Wheat Kings (WHL)
5	141	Justin Kipkie	D	Canada	Victoria Royals (WHL)
