= 2025–26 Columbus Blue Jackets season =

National Hockey League season

2025–26 Columbus Blue Jackets
- Division: 5th Metropolitan
- Conference: 11th Eastern
- 2025–26 record: 40–30–12
- Home record: 20–13–8
- Road record: 20–17–4
- Goals for: 253
- Goals against: 253

Team information
- General manager: Don Waddell
- Coach: Dean Evason (Oct. 9 – Jan. 12); Rick Bowness (Jan. 12 – Apr. 14)
- Captain: Boone Jenner
- Alternate captains: Erik Gudbranson; Zach Werenski
- Arena: Nationwide Arena
- Minor league affiliate: Cleveland Monsters (AHL)

Team leaders
- Goals: Kirill Marchenko (27)
- Assists: Zach Werenski (59)
- Points: Zach Werenski (81)
- Penalty minutes: Mathieu Olivier (101)
- Plus/minus: Mason Marchment (+21)
- Wins: Jet Greaves (26)
- Goals against average: Jet Greaves (2.60)

The 2025–26 Columbus Blue Jackets season was the 26th season for the National Hockey League (NHL) franchise that was established on June 25, 1997.

On April 13, 2026, the Blue Jackets were eliminated from playoff contention for the sixth consecutive season for the first time since the 2001–02 season and the 2007–08 season following a 3–2 shootout win by the Philadelphia Flyers against the Carolina Hurricanes.

== Standings ==
=== Divisional standings ===
Metropolitan Division
| Pos | Team | GP | W | L | OTL | RW | GF | GA | GD | Pts |
|---|---|---|---|---|---|---|---|---|---|---|
| 1 | z – Carolina Hurricanes | 82 | 53 | 22 | 7 | 39 | 296 | 240 | +56 | 113 |
| 2 | x – Pittsburgh Penguins | 82 | 41 | 25 | 16 | 34 | 293 | 268 | +25 | 98 |
| 3 | x – Philadelphia Flyers | 82 | 43 | 27 | 12 | 27 | 250 | 243 | +7 | 98 |
| 4 | Washington Capitals | 82 | 43 | 30 | 9 | 37 | 263 | 244 | +19 | 95 |
| 5 | Columbus Blue Jackets | 82 | 40 | 30 | 12 | 28 | 253 | 253 | 0 | 92 |
| 6 | New York Islanders | 82 | 43 | 34 | 5 | 29 | 233 | 241 | −8 | 91 |
| 7 | New Jersey Devils | 82 | 42 | 37 | 3 | 29 | 230 | 254 | −24 | 87 |
| 8 | New York Rangers | 82 | 34 | 39 | 9 | 25 | 238 | 250 | −12 | 77 |

Source: National Hockey League
Rules for classification: 1) Fewer number of games played (GP, only during regular season); 2) Greater number of regulation wins (RW); 3) Greater number of wins in regulation and overtime, excluding shootout wins (ROW); 4) Greater number of total wins, including shootouts (W); 5) Greater number of points earned in head-to-head play; if teams played an uneven number of head-to-head games, the result of the first game on the home ice of the team with the extra home game is discarded; 6) Greater goal differential (GD); 7) Greater number of goals scored (GF)
x – Clinched playoff spot; z – Clinched conference

=== Conference standings ===
Eastern Conference Wild Card
| Pos | Div | Team | GP | W | L | OTL | RW | GF | GA | GD | Pts |
|---|---|---|---|---|---|---|---|---|---|---|---|
| 1 | AT | x – Boston Bruins | 82 | 45 | 27 | 10 | 33 | 272 | 250 | +22 | 100 |
| 2 | AT | x – Ottawa Senators | 82 | 44 | 27 | 11 | 38 | 278 | 246 | +32 | 99 |
| 3 | ME | Washington Capitals | 82 | 43 | 30 | 9 | 37 | 263 | 244 | +19 | 95 |
| 4 | AT | Detroit Red Wings | 82 | 41 | 31 | 10 | 30 | 241 | 258 | −17 | 92 |
| 5 | ME | Columbus Blue Jackets | 82 | 40 | 30 | 12 | 28 | 253 | 253 | 0 | 92 |
| 6 | ME | New York Islanders | 82 | 43 | 34 | 5 | 29 | 233 | 241 | −8 | 91 |
| 7 | ME | New Jersey Devils | 82 | 42 | 37 | 3 | 29 | 230 | 254 | −24 | 87 |
| 8 | AT | Florida Panthers | 82 | 40 | 38 | 4 | 32 | 251 | 276 | −25 | 84 |
| 9 | AT | Toronto Maple Leafs | 82 | 32 | 36 | 14 | 23 | 253 | 299 | −46 | 78 |
| 10 | ME | New York Rangers | 82 | 34 | 39 | 9 | 25 | 238 | 250 | −12 | 77 |

Source: National Hockey League
Rules for classification: 1) Fewer number of games played (GP, only during regular season); 2) Greater number of regulation wins (RW); 3) Greater number of wins in regulation and overtime, excluding shootout wins (ROW); 4) Greater number of total wins, including shootouts (W); 5) Greater number of points earned in head-to-head play; if teams played an uneven number of head-to-head games, the result of the first game on the home ice of the team with the extra home game is discarded; 6) Greater goal differential (GD); 7) Greater number of goals scored (GF)
x – Clinched playoff spot

== Schedule and results ==
=== Preseason ===
The Columbus Blue Jackets preseason schedule was released on June 24, 2025.

2025 preseason game log: 2–5–0 (home: 2–2–0; road: 0–3–0)
| # | Date | Visitor | Score | Home | OT | Decision | Attendance | Record | Recap |
|---|---|---|---|---|---|---|---|---|---|
| 1 | September 21 | St. Louis | 1–4 | Columbus | | Fedotov | 12,066 | 1–0–0 |
| 2 | September 22 | Buffalo | 4–0 | Columbus | | Greaves | 9,778 | 1–1–0 |
| 3 | September 23 | Columbus | 1–2 | Buffalo | | Fedotov | 9,903 | 1–2–0 |
| 4 | September 24 | Pittsburgh | 1–4 | Columbus | | Greaves | 11,185 | 2–2–0 |
| 5 | September 27 | Columbus | 1–4 | Pittsburgh | | Merzlikins | 18,333 | 2–3–0 |
| 6 | September 30 | Washington | 4–3 | Columbus | | Greaves | 11,128 | 2–4–0 |
| 7 | October 4 | Columbus | 1–2 | Washington | | Merzlikins | 12,131 | 2–5–0 |

=== Regular season ===
The Columbus Blue Jackets regular season schedule was released on July 16, 2025.

2025–26 game log

October: 6–4–0 (home: 2–3–0; road: 4–1–0)
| # | Date | Visitor | Score | Home | OT | Decision | Attendance | Record | Pts | Recap |
|---|---|---|---|---|---|---|---|---|---|---|
| 1 | October 9 | Columbus | 1–2 | Nashville | | Greaves | 17,244 | 0–1–0 | 0 |
| 2 | October 11 | Columbus | 7–4 | Minnesota | | Merzlikins | 18,836 | 1–1–0 | 2 |
| 3 | October 13 | New Jersey | 3–2 | Columbus | | Greaves | 18,627 | 1–2–0 | 2 |
| 4 | October 16 | Colorado | 4–1 | Columbus | | Merzlikins | 17,249 | 1–3–0 | 2 |
| 5 | October 18 | Tampa Bay | 2–3 | Columbus | | Greaves | 15,822 | 2–3–0 | 4 |
| 6 | October 21 | Columbus | 5–1 | Dallas | | Merzlikins | 18,532 | 3–3–0 | 6 |
| 7 | October 24 | Washington | 5–1 | Columbus | | Greaves | 17,714 | 3–4–0 | 6 |
| 8 | October 25 | Columbus | 5–4 | Pittsburgh | SO | Merzlikins | 15,261 | 4–4–0 | 8 |
| 9 | October 28 | Columbus | 4–3 | Buffalo | OT | Greaves | 15,059 | 5–4–0 | 10 |
| 10 | October 29 | Toronto | 3–6 | Columbus | | Merzlikins | 16,558 | 6–4–0 | 12 |

November: 5–5–5 (home: 3–0–3; road: 2–5–2)
| # | Date | Visitor | Score | Home | OT | Decision | Attendance | Record | Pts | Recap |
|---|---|---|---|---|---|---|---|---|---|---|
| 11 | November 1 | St. Louis | 2–3 | Columbus | | Greaves | 17,130 | 7–4–0 | 14 |
| 12 | November 2 | Columbus | 2–3 | NY Islanders | | Merzlikins | 14,984 | 7–5–0 | 14 |
| 13 | November 5 | Columbus | 1–5 | Calgary | | Greaves | 16,802 | 7–6–0 | 14 |
| 14 | November 8 | Columbus | 3–4 | Vancouver | | Merzlikins | 18,763 | 7–7–0 | 14 |
| 15 | November 10 | Columbus | 4–5 | Edmonton | OT | Greaves | 18,247 | 7–7–1 | 15 |
| 16 | November 11 | Columbus | 2–1 | Seattle | SO | Greaves | 17,151 | 8–7–1 | 17 |
| 17 | November 13 | Edmonton | 4–5 | Columbus | | Greaves | 18,749 | 9–7–1 | 19 |
| 18 | November 15 | NY Rangers | 2–1 | Columbus | SO | Greaves | 16,298 | 9–7–2 | 20 |
| 19 | November 17 | Montreal | 3–4 | Columbus | SO | Greaves | 14,811 | 10–7–2 | 22 |
| 20 | November 18 | Columbus | 2–5 | Winnipeg | | Merzlikins | 13,847 | 10–8–2 | 22 |
| 21 | November 20 | Columbus | 3–2 | Toronto | OT | Greaves | 18,438 | 11–8–2 | 24 |
| 22 | November 22 | Columbus | 3–4 | Detroit | OT | Greaves | 19,515 | 11–8–3 | 25 |
| 23 | November 24 | Columbus | 5–1 | Washington | | Greaves | 17,337 | 11–9–3 | 25 |
| 24 | November 26 | Toronto | 2–1 | Columbus | OT | Greaves | 16,632 | 11–9–4 | 26 |
| 25 | November 28 | Pittsburgh | 4–3 | Columbus | OT | Greaves | 18,194 | 11–9–5 | 27 |

December: 6–7–1 (home: 3–4–0; road: 3–3–1)
| # | Date | Visitor | Score | Home | OT | Decision | Attendance | Record | Pts | Recap |
|---|---|---|---|---|---|---|---|---|---|---|
| 26 | December 1 | Columbus | 5–3 | New Jersey | | Merzlikins | 13,381 | 12–9–5 | 29 |
| 27 | December 4 | Detroit | 5–6 | Columbus | SO | Merzlikins | 16,818 | 13–9–5 | 31 |
| 28 | December 6 | Columbus | 6–7 | Florida | OT | Merzlikins | 19,269 | 13–9–6 | 32 |
| 29 | December 7 | Columbus | 0–2 | Washington | | Greaves | 17,312 | 13–10–6 | 32 |
| 30 | December 9 | Columbus | 1–4 | Carolina | | Greaves | 18,299 | 13–11–6 | 32 |
| 31 | December 11 | Ottawa | 6–3 | Columbus | | Greaves | 15,059 | 13–12–6 | 32 |
| 32 | December 13 | Vegas | 3–2 | Columbus | | Greaves | 16,965 | 13–13–6 | 32 |
| 33 | December 16 | Anaheim | 3–4 | Columbus | OT | Greaves | 14,120 | 14–13–6 | 34 |
| 34 | December 18 | Minnesota | 5–2 | Columbus | | Greaves | 14,845 | 14–14–6 | 34 |
| 35 | December 20 | Columbus | 3–4 | Anaheim | | Merzlikins | 15,897 | 14–15–6 | 34 |
| 36 | December 22 | Columbus | 3–1 | Los Angeles | | Greaves | 18,145 | 15–15–6 | 36 |
| 37 | December 28 | NY Islanders | 2–4 | Columbus | | Greaves | 18,223 | 16–15–6 | 38 |
| 38 | December 29 | Columbus | 4–1 | Ottawa | | Greaves | 17,902 | 17–15–6 | 40 |
| 39 | December 31 | New Jersey | 3–2 | Columbus | | Greaves | 17,163 | 17–16–6 | 40 |

January: 7–4–1 (home: 5–1–1; road: 2–3–0)
| # | Date | Visitor | Score | Home | OT | Decision | Attendance | Record | Pts | Recap |
|---|---|---|---|---|---|---|---|---|---|---|
| 40 | January 3 | Buffalo | 1–5 | Columbus | | Greaves | 18,809 | 18–16–6 | 42 |
| 41 | January 4 | Pittsburgh | 5–4 | Columbus | OT | Greaves | 18,212 | 18–16–7 | 43 |
| 42 | January 6 | Columbus | 2–5 | San Jose | | Greaves | 16,258 | 18–17–7 | 43 |
| 43 | January 8 | Columbus | 3–5 | Vegas | | Greaves | 17,614 | 18–18–7 | 43 |
| 44 | January 10 | Columbus | 0–4 | Colorado | | Merzlikins | 18,127 | 18–19–7 | 43 |
| 45 | January 11 | Columbus | 3–2 | Utah | OT | Greaves | 12,478 | 19–19–7 | 45 |
| 46 | January 13 | Calgary | 3–5 | Columbus | | Greaves | 13,385 | 20–19–7 | 47 |
| 47 | January 15 | Vancouver | 1–4 | Columbus | | Merzlikins | 14,918 | 21–19–7 | 49 |
| 48 | January 17 | Columbus | 4–3 | Pittsburgh | SO | Merzlikins | 18,296 | 22–19–7 | 51 |
| 49 | January 20 | Ottawa | 4–1 | Columbus | | Merzlikins | 13,278 | 22–20–7 | 51 |
| 50 | January 22 | Dallas | 0–1 | Columbus | | Greaves | 14,372 | 23–20–7 | 53 |
| 51 | January 24 | Tampa Bay | 5–8 | Columbus | | Greaves | 16,852 | 24–20–7 | 55 |
| — | January 26 | Los Angeles | | Columbus | Game postponed due to severe weather. Makeup date: March 9 |
| 52 | January 28 | Philadelphia | 3–5 | Columbus | | Merzlikins | 15,244 | 25–20–7 | 57 |
| 53 | January 30 | Columbus | 4–2 | Chicago | | Merzlikins | 20,247 | 26–20–7 | 59 |
| 54 | January 31 | Columbus | 5–3 | St. Louis | | Greaves | 18,096 | 27–20–7 | 61 |

February: 2–1–1 (home: 1–0–1; road: 1–1–0)
| # | Date | Visitor | Score | Home | OT | Decision | Attendance | Record | Pts | Recap |
|---|---|---|---|---|---|---|---|---|---|---|
| 55 | February 3 | Columbus | 3–0 | New Jersey | | Merzlikins | 15,551 | 28–20–7 | 63 |
| 56 | February 4 | Chicago | 0–4 | Columbus | | Greaves | 18,575 | 29–20–7 | 65 |
| 57 | February 26 | Columbus | 2–4 | Boston | | Merzlikins | 17,850 | 29–21–7 | 65 |
| 58 | February 28 | NY Islanders | 4–3 | Columbus | OT | Greaves | 18,925 | 29–21–8 | 65 |

March: 9–4–4 (home: 5–2–3; road: 4–2–1)
| # | Date | Visitor | Score | Home | OT | Decision | Attendance | Record | Pts | Recap |
|---|---|---|---|---|---|---|---|---|---|---|
| 59 | March 2 | Columbus | 5–4 | NY Rangers | OT | Merzlikins | 16,790 | 30–21–8 | 68 |
| 60 | March 3 | Nashville | 2–3 | Columbus | | Greaves | 16,526 | 31–21–8 | 70 |
| 61 | March 5 | Florida | 2–4 | Columbus | | Greaves | 16,669 | 32–21–8 | 72 |
| 62 | March 7 | Utah | 5–4 | Columbus | OT | Merzlikins | 18,668 | 32–21–9 | 73 |
| 63 | March 9 | Los Angeles | 5–4 | Columbus | OT | Greaves | 14,838 | 32–21–10 | 74 |
| 64 | March 10 | Columbus | 5–2 | Tampa Bay | | Merzlikins | 19,092 | 33–21–10 | 76 |
| 65 | March 12 | Columbus | 1–2 | Florida | OT | Merzlikins | 18,686 | 33–21–11 | 77 |
| 66 | March 14 | Columbus | 2–1 | Philadelphia | SO | Greaves | 19,645 | 34–21–11 | 79 |
| 67 | March 17 | Carolina | 1–5 | Columbus | | Greaves | 16,156 | 35–21–11 | 81 |
| 68 | March 19 | NY Rangers | 3–6 | Columbus | | Greaves | 15,829 | 36–21–11 | 83 |
| 69 | March 21 | Seattle | 2–5 | Columbus | | Merzlikins | 18,864 | 37–21–11 | 85 |
| 70 | March 22 | Columbus | 0–1 | NY Islanders | | Greaves | 17,255 | 37–22–11 | 85 |
| 71 | March 24 | Columbus | 3–2 | Philadelphia | | Greaves | 19,304 | 38–22–11 | 87 |
| 72 | March 26 | Columbus | 1–2 | Montreal | | Greaves | 20,962 | 38–23–11 | 87 |
| 73 | March 28 | San Jose | 3–2 | Columbus | | Merzlikins | 18,874 | 38–24–11 | 87 |
| 74 | March 29 | Boston | 4–3 | Columbus | SO | Greaves | 18,684 | 38–24–12 | 88 |
| 75 | March 31 | Carolina | 5–2 | Columbus | | Greaves | 18,293 | 38–25–12 | 88 |

April: 2–4–0 (home: 0–3–0; road: 2–1–0)
| # | Date | Visitor | Score | Home | OT | Decision | Attendance | Record | Pts | Recap |
|---|---|---|---|---|---|---|---|---|---|---|
| 76 | April 2 | Columbus | 1–5 | Carolina | | Merzlikins | 18,556 | 38–26–12 | 88 |
| 77 | April 4 | Winnipeg | 2–1 | Columbus | | Greaves | 18,272 | 38–27–12 | 88 |
| 78 | April 7 | Columbus | 4–3 | Detroit | SO | Greaves | 17,687 | 39–27–12 | 90 |
| 79 | April 9 | Columbus | 0–5 | Buffalo | | Greaves | 19,070 | 39–28–12 | 90 |
| 80 | April 11 | Columbus | 5–2 | Montreal | | Greaves | 20,962 | 40–28–12 | 92 |
| 81 | April 12 | Boston | 3–2 | Columbus | | Greaves | 18,532 | 40–29–12 | 92 |
| 82 | April 14 | Washington | 2–1 | Columbus | | Greaves | 18,244 | 40–30–12 | 92 |

Legend: Win (2 points) Loss (0 points) Overtime/shootout loss (1 point)

== Player statistics ==
As of April 14, 2026

=== Skaters ===
Regular season
| Player | GP | G | A | Pts | +/− | PIM |
|---|---|---|---|---|---|---|
| Zach Werenski | 75 | 22 | 59 | 81 | +7 | 18 |
| Kirill Marchenko | 76 | 27 | 40 | 67 | +7 | 32 |
| Adam Fantilli | 82 | 24 | 35 | 59 | −13 | 38 |
| Charlie Coyle | 82 | 20 | 38 | 58 | +3 | 14 |
| Boone Jenner | 67 | 13 | 25 | 38 | +3 | 44 |
| Sean Monahan | 78 | 13 | 23 | 36 | −1 | 12 |
| Cole Sillinger | 81 | 8 | 25 | 33 | +2 | 37 |
| Dmitri Voronkov | 63 | 17 | 15 | 32 | −1 | 59 |
| Mason Marchment^{†} | 39 | 15 | 17 | 32 | +21 | 30 |
| Damon Severson | 71 | 8 | 24 | 32 | +18 | 45 |
| Denton Mateychuk | 75 | 13 | 18 | 31 | +12 | 8 |
| Ivan Provorov | 82 | 9 | 22 | 31 | +14 | 32 |
| Mathieu Olivier | 61 | 15 | 11 | 26 | +13 | 101 |
| Kent Johnson | 76 | 7 | 15 | 22 | −8 | 20 |
| Miles Wood | 54 | 8 | 6 | 14 | −10 | 26 |
| Isac Lundestrom | 68 | 4 | 8 | 12 | −2 | 4 |
| Dante Fabbro | 74 | 5 | 6 | 11 | −16 | 33 |
| Danton Heinen^{†} | 33 | 5 | 5 | 10 | +6 | 8 |
| Conor Garland^{†} | 21 | 5 | 2 | 7 | −6 | 4 |
| Egor Chinakhov^{‡} | 29 | 3 | 3 | 6 | −6 | 6 |
| Brendan Gaunce | 25 | 2 | 4 | 6 | −1 | 12 |
| Zach Aston-Reese | 27 | 1 | 4 | 5 | −1 | 12 |
| Erik Gudbranson | 37 | 1 | 2 | 3 | +6 | 19 |
| Jake Christiansen | 40 | 0 | 3 | 3 | −7 | 8 |
| Brendan Smith | 15 | 0 | 2 | 2 | −1 | 11 |
| Egor Zamula^{†} | 20 | 0 | 2 | 2 | +2 | 0 |
| Mikael Pyyhtia | 5 | 1 | 0 | 1 | −1 | 0 |
| Dysin Mayo | 3 | 0 | 1 | 1 | +1 | 0 |
| Luca Del Bel Belluz | 14 | 0 | 1 | 1 | −2 | 4 |
| Luca Pinelli | 3 | 0 | 0 | 0 | −1 | 0 |

=== Goaltenders ===
Regular season
| Player | GP | GS | TOI | W | L | OT | GA | GAA | SA | SV% | SO | G | A | PIM |
|---|---|---|---|---|---|---|---|---|---|---|---|---|---|---|
| Jet Greaves | 55 | 53 | 3276:06 | 26 | 19 | 9 | 142 | 2.60 | 1539 | .908 | 2 | 0 | 1 | 0 |
| Elvis Merzlikins | 30 | 29 | 1678:37 | 14 | 11 | 3 | 95 | 3.40 | 812 | .883 | 1 | 0 | 2 | 0 |

^{†}Denotes player spent time with another team before joining the Blue Jackets. Stats reflect time with the Blue Jackets only.
^{‡}Denotes player was traded mid-season. Stats reflect time with the Blue Jackets only.
Bold/italics denotes franchise record.

== Transactions ==
=== Trades ===
| Date | Details | | Ref |
|---|---|---|---|
| June 27, 2025 | To Colorado Avalanche Gavin Brindley; 3rd-round pick in 2025 conditional CBJ 2nd-round pick in 2027 or MIN 2nd-round pick in 2027 | To Columbus Blue Jackets Charlie Coyle; Miles Wood | |
| June 28, 2025 | To Detroit Red Wings 4th-round pick in 2025 (#109 overall); 4th-round pick in 2026 | To Columbus Blue Jackets 3rd-round pick in 2025 (#76 overall) | |
| June 28, 2025 | To Seattle Kraken 7th-round pick in 2025 (#205 overall); VGK 7th-round pick in 2025 (#218 overall) | To Columbus Blue Jackets 7th-round pick in 2025 (#198 overall) | |
| September 14, 2025 | To Philadelphia Flyers 6th-round pick in 2026 | To Columbus Blue Jackets Ivan Fedotov | |
| December 20, 2025 | To Seattle Kraken NYR 4th-round pick in 2026; 2nd-round pick in 2027 | To Columbus Blue Jackets Mason Marchment | |
| December 29, 2025 | To Pittsburgh Penguins Egor Chinakhov | To Columbus Blue Jackets Danton Heinen; STL 2nd-round pick in 2026; WSH 3rd-round pick in 2027 | |
| March 6, 2026 | To Vancouver Canucks 3rd-round pick in 2026; 2nd-round pick in 2028 | To Columbus Blue Jackets Conor Garland | |

=== Players acquired ===
| Date | Player | New team | Term | Via | Ref |
|---|---|---|---|---|---|
| July 1, 2025 | Christian Jaros | HC CSKA Moscow (KHL) | 1-year | Free agency | |
| July 1, 2025 | Isac Lundestrom | Anaheim Ducks | 2-year | Free agency | |
| July 16, 2025 | Dysin Mayo | Vegas Golden Knights | 1-year | Free agency | |
| August 18, 2025 | Hudson Fasching | New York Islanders | 1-year | Free agency | |
| November 24, 2025 | Brendan Smith | Dallas Stars | 1-year | Free agency | |

=== Players lost ===
| Date | Player | New team | Term | Via | Ref |
|---|---|---|---|---|---|
| July 1, 2025 | Cole Clayton | San Jose Sharks | 1-year | Free agency | |
| July 1, 2025 | Justin Danforth | Buffalo Sabres | 2-year | Free agency | |
| July 1, 2025 | Jordan Harris | Boston Bruins | 1-year | Free agency | |
| July 1, 2025 | Sean Kuraly | Boston Bruins | 2-year | Free agency | |
| July 1, 2025 | Joseph LaBate | Vancouver Canucks | 1-year | Free agency | |
| July 1, 2025 | James van Riemsdyk | Detroit Red Wings | 1-year | Free agency | |
| July 3, 2025 | Trey Fix-Wolansky | New York Rangers | 1-year | Free agency | |
| August 22, 2025 | Luke Kunin | Florida Panthers | 1-year | Free agency | |
| October 1, 2025 | Christian Jaros | HC Spartak Moscow (KHL) | | Waivers | |
| October 3, 2025 | Daemon Hunt | Minnesota Wild | | Waivers | |

=== Signings ===
| Date | Player | Term | Ref |
|---|---|---|---|
| July 1, 2025 | Ivan Provorov | 7-year | |
| July 1, 2025 | Owen Sillinger | 1-year | |
| July 5, 2025 | Dmitri Voronkov | 2-year | |
| August 13, 2025 | Mikael Pyyhtia | 1-year | |
| August 15, 2025 | Daemon Hunt | 1-year | |

== Draft picks ==
Below are the Columbus Blue Jackets' selections at the 2025 NHL entry draft, which was held on June 27 and 28, 2025, at the Peacock Theater in Los Angeles, California.

| Round | # | Player | Pos. | Nationality | Team (League) |
|---|---|---|---|---|---|
| 1 | 14 | Jackson Smith | D | Canada | Tri-City Americans (WHL) |
| 1 | 20 (Note: The Minnesota Wild's first-round pick went to the Columbus Blue Jackets as the result of a trade on November 30, 2024, that sent David Jiricek and a fifth-round pick in 2025 to Minnesota in exchange for Daemon Hunt a third and fourth-round pick in 2026, a second-round pick in 2027 and this pick (being conditional at the time of the trade). The condition – Columbus will receive a first-round pick in 2025 if Minnesota's first-round pick in 2025 is outside of the top five selections – was converted when the Wild qualified for the 2025 Stanley Cup playoffs on April 15, 2025.) | Pyotr Andreyanov | G | Russia | Krasnaya Armiya (MHL) |
| 3 | 76 (Note: The Detroit Red Wings' third-round pick went to the Blue Jackets as the result of a trade on June 28, 2025, that sent a fourth-round pick in 2025 (109th overall) and 2026 to Detroit in exchange for this pick.) | Malte Vass | D | Sweden | Farjestad BK J20 (J20 Nationell) |
| 5 | 160 (Note: The Florida Panthers' fifth-round pick went to the Blue Jackets as the result of a trade on June 26, 2025, that sent Daniil Tarasov to Florida in exchange for this pick.) | Owen Griffin | C | Canada | Oshawa Generals (OHL) |
| 6 | 173 | Victor Hedin Raftheim | D | Sweden | Brynas J20 (J20 Nationell) |
| 7 | 198 (Note: The Seattle Kraken's seventh-round pick went to the Blue Jackets as the result of a trade on June 28, 2025, that sent a seventh-round pick in 2025 (205th overall) and Vegas's seventh-round pick in 2025 (218th overall) to Seattle in exchange for this pick.) | Jeremy Loranger | C | Canada | Sherwood Park Crusaders (BCHL) |
