= 2025–26 Winnipeg Jets season =

Canadian ice hockey team season

2025–26 Winnipeg Jets
- Division: 7th Central
- Conference: 12th Western
- 2025–26 record: 35–35–12
- Home record: 19–16–6
- Road record: 16–19–6
- Goals for: 231
- Goals against: 260

Team information
- General manager: Kevin Cheveldayoff
- Coach: Scott Arniel
- Captain: Adam Lowry
- Alternate captains: Josh Morrissey; Mark Scheifele
- Arena: Canada Life Centre
- Minor league affiliate: Manitoba Moose (AHL)

Team leaders
- Goals: Kyle Connor (39)
- Assists: Mark Scheifele (67)
- Points: Mark Scheifele (103)
- Penalty minutes: Logan Stanley (99)
- Plus/minus: Dylan DeMelo; Tanner Pearson (+7)
- Wins: Connor Hellebuyck (23)
- Goals against average: Connor Hellebuyck (2.86)

The 2025–26 Winnipeg Jets season was the 43rd season of play for the National Hockey League (NHL) franchise that was established on June 22, 1979, 51st season for the organization overall, and the 15th in Winnipeg, since the franchise relocated from Atlanta prior to the start of the 2011–12 NHL season. The team entered the 2025–26 season as the defending Presidents' Trophy winners.

On April 13, 2026, the Jets were eliminated from playoff contention for the first time since the 2021–22 season after both the Los Angeles Kings win against the Seattle Kraken and losing 6–2 to the Vegas Golden Knights. The Jets became the fifth defending Presidents' Trophy winners to miss the playoffs after the 1992–93 New York Rangers, 2007–08 Buffalo Sabres, 2014–15 Boston Bruins and 2024–25 New York Rangers. In addition, this marks the first time in league history that the defending Presidents' Trophy winners failed to make the playoffs in consecutive years.

== Standings ==
=== Divisional standings ===
Central Division
Pos	Team	GP	W	L	OTL	RW	GF	GA	GD	Pts
1	p – Colorado Avalanche	82	55	16	11	48	302	203	+99	121
2	x – Dallas Stars	82	50	20	12	38	279	226	+53	112
3	x – Minnesota Wild	82	46	24	12	31	272	240	+32	104
4	x – Utah Mammoth	82	43	33	6	33	268	240	+28	92
5	St. Louis Blues	82	37	33	12	33	231	258	−27	86
6	Nashville Predators	82	38	34	10	28	247	269	−22	86
7	Winnipeg Jets	82	35	35	12	28	231	260	−29	82
8	Chicago Blackhawks	82	29	39	14	21	213	275	−62	72

Source: National Hockey League
Rules for classification: 1) Fewer number of games played (GP, only during regular season); 2) Greater number of regulation wins (RW); 3) Greater number of wins in regulation and overtime, excluding shootout wins (ROW); 4) Greater number of total wins, including shootouts (W); 5) Greater number of points earned in head-to-head play; if teams played an uneven number of head-to-head games, the result of the first game on the home ice of the team with the extra home game is discarded; 6) Greater goal differential (GD); 7) Greater number of goals scored (GF)
p – Clinched Presidents' Trophy; x – Clinched playoff spot

=== Conference standings ===
Western Conference Wild Card
Pos	Div	Team	GP	W	L	OTL	RW	GF	GA	GD	Pts
1	CE	x – Utah Mammoth	82	43	33	6	33	268	240	+28	92
2	PA	x – Los Angeles Kings	82	35	27	20	22	225	247	−22	90
3	CE	St. Louis Blues	82	37	33	12	33	231	258	−27	86
4	CE	Nashville Predators	82	38	34	10	28	247	269	−22	86
5	PA	San Jose Sharks	82	39	35	8	27	251	292	−41	86
6	CE	Winnipeg Jets	82	35	35	12	28	231	260	−29	82
7	PA	Seattle Kraken	82	34	37	11	26	226	263	−37	79
8	PA	Calgary Flames	82	34	39	9	27	212	259	−47	77
9	CE	Chicago Blackhawks	82	29	39	14	22	213	275	−62	72
10	PA	Vancouver Canucks	82	25	49	8	15	216	316	−100	58

Source: National Hockey League
Rules for classification: 1) Fewer number of games played (GP, only during regular season); 2) Greater number of regulation wins (RW); 3) Greater number of wins in regulation and overtime, excluding shootout wins (ROW); 4) Greater number of total wins, including shootouts (W); 5) Greater number of points earned in head-to-head play; if teams played an uneven number of head-to-head games, the result of the first game on the home ice of the team with the extra home game is discarded; 6) Greater goal differential (GD); 7) Greater number of goals scored (GF)
x – Clinched playoff spot

== Schedule and results ==
=== Preseason ===
The Winnipeg Jets 2025 pre-season schedule was released on June 26, 2025.

2025 preseason: 2–3–1 (home: 1–1–1; road: 1–2–0)

Game	Date	Visitor	Score	Home	OT	Decision	Location	Attendance	Record	Recap
1	September 21	Minnesota	3–2	Winnipeg	OT	Poulter	Canada Life Centre	14,481	0–0–1	
2	September 23	Edmonton	3–2	Winnipeg		Comrie	Canada Life Centre	12,968	0–1–1	
3	September 26	Winnipeg	0–4	Edmonton		DiVincentiis	Rogers Place	16,491	0–2–1	
4	September 27	Calgary	2–4	Winnipeg		Comrie	Canada Life Centre	14,007	1–2–1	
5	September 30	Winnipeg	2–3	Minnesota		Hellebuyck	Grand Casino Arena	16,487	1–3–1	
6	October 3	Winnipeg	5–4	Calgary	SO	Hellebuyck	Scotiabank Saddledome	15,923	2–3–1	

=== Regular season ===
The Winnipeg Jets' 2025–26 regular season schedule was released on July 16, 2025.

2025–26 game log
October: 8–3–0 (home: 4–3–0; road: 4–0–0)

Game	Date	Visitor	Score	Home	OT	Decision	Location	Attendance	Record	Points	Recap
1	October 9	Dallas	5–4	Winnipeg		Hellebuyck	Canada Life Centre	14,917	0–1–0	0	
2	October 11	Los Angeles	2–3	Winnipeg		Hellebuyck	Canada Life Centre	14,204	1–1–0	2	
3	October 13	Winnipeg	5–2	NY Islanders		Comrie	UBS Arena	13,287	2–1–0	4	
4	October 16	Winnipeg	5–2	Philadelphia		Hellebuyck	Xfinity Mobile Arena	16,170	3–1–0	6	
5	October 18	Nashville	1–4	Winnipeg		Hellebuyck	Canada Life Centre	14,309	4–1–0	8	
6	October 20	Winnipeg	2–1	Calgary		Hellebuyck	Scotiabank Saddledome	16,800	5–1–0	10	
7	October 23	Seattle	3–0	Winnipeg		Hellebuyck	Canada Life Centre	13,690	5–2–0	10	
8	October 24	Calgary	3–5	Winnipeg		Comrie	Canada Life Centre	13,967	6–2–0	12	
9	October 26	Utah	3–2	Winnipeg		Hellebuyck	Canada Life Centre	13,678	6–3–0	12	
10	October 28	Winnipeg	4–3	Minnesota	OT	Hellebuyck	Grand Casino Arena	16,102	7–3–0	14	
11	October 30	Chicago	3–6	Winnipeg		Hellebuyck	Canada Life Centre	13,682	8–3–0	16	

November: 5–8–0 (home: 2–2–0; road: 3–6–0)

Game	Date	Visitor	Score	Home	OT	Decision	Location	Attendance	Record	Points	Recap
12	November 1	Pittsburgh	2–5	Winnipeg		Comrie	Canada Life Centre	14,262	9–3–0	18	
13	November 4	Winnipeg	0–3	Los Angeles		Hellebuyck	Crypto.com Arena	14,671	9–4–0	18	
14	November 7	Winnipeg	1–2	San Jose		Hellebuyck	SAP Center	13,053	9–5–0	18	
15	November 9	Winnipeg	1–4	Anaheim		Comrie	Honda Center	15,286	9–6–0	18	
16	November 11	Winnipeg	5–3	Vancouver		Hellebuyck	Rogers Arena	18,725	10–6–0	20	
17	November 13	Winnipeg	3–5	Seattle		Hellebuyck	Climate Pledge Arena	17,151	10–7–0	20	
18	November 15	Winnipeg	4–3	Calgary	SO	Hellebuyck	Scotiabank Saddledome	17,494	11–7–0	22	
19	November 18	Columbus	2–5	Winnipeg		Comrie	Canada Life Centre	13,847	12–7–0	24	
20	November 21	Carolina	4–3	Winnipeg		Comrie	Canada Life Centre	15,225	12–8–0	24	
21	November 23	Minnesota	3–0	Winnipeg		Comrie	Canada Life Centre	14,368	12–9–0	24	
22	November 26	Winnipeg	3–4	Washington		Comrie	Capital One Arena	18,347	12–10–0	24	
23	November 28	Winnipeg	1–5	Carolina		Milic	Lenovo Center	18,312	12–11–0	24	
24	November 29	Winnipeg	5–2	Nashville		Comrie	Bridgestone Arena	17,159	13–11–0	26	

December: 2–8–4 (home: 2–3–2; road: 0–5–2)

Game	Date	Visitor	Score	Home	OT	Decision	Location	Attendance	Record	Points	Recap
25	December 1	Winnipeg	1–5	Buffalo		Comrie	KeyBank Center	15,758	13–12–0	26	
26	December 3	Winnipeg	2–3	Montreal	SO	Comrie	Bell Centre	20,962	13–12–1	27	
27	December 5	Buffalo	1–4	Winnipeg		Comrie	Canada Life Centre	13,682	14–12–1	29	
28	December 6	Winnipeg	2–6	Edmonton		Comrie	Rogers Place	18,347	14–13–1	29	
29	December 9	Dallas	4–3	Winnipeg		Comrie	Canada Life Centre	13,675	14–14–1	29	
30	December 11	Boston	6–3	Winnipeg		Comrie	Canada Life Centre	13,158	14–15–1	29	
31	December 13	Washington	1–5	Winnipeg		Hellebuyck	Canada Life Centre	14,096	15–15–1	31	
32	December 15	Ottawa	3–2	Winnipeg	OT	Hellebuyck	Canada Life Centre	13,566	15–15–2	32	
33	December 17	Winnipeg	0–1	St. Louis		Hellebuyck	Enterprise Center	16,953	15–16–2	32	
34	December 19	Winnipeg	2–3	Colorado		Hellebuyck	Ball Arena	18,098	15–17–2	32	
35	December 21	Winnipeg	3–4	Utah	OT	Hellebuyck	Delta Center	12,478	15–17–3	33	
36	December 27	Minnesota	4–3	Winnipeg	OT	Hellebuyck	Canada Life Centre	15,225	15–17–4	34	
37	December 29	Edmonton	3–1	Winnipeg		Hellebuyck	Canada Life Centre	15,225	15–18–4	34	
38	December 31	Winnipeg	1–2	Detroit		Hellebuyck	Little Caesars Arena	19,515	15–19–4	34	

January: 7–6–3 (home: 4–2–3; road: 3–4–0)

Game	Date	Visitor	Score	Home	OT	Decision	Location	Attendance	Record	Points	Recap
39	January 1	Winnipeg	5–6	Toronto		Comrie	Scotiabank Arena	18,860	15–20–4	34	
40	January 3	Winnipeg	2–4	Ottawa		Hellebuyck	Canadian Tire Centre	16,872	15–21–4	34	
41	January 6	Vegas	4–3	Winnipeg	OT	Hellebuyck	Canada Life Centre	13,951	15–21–5	35	
42	January 8	Edmonton	4–3	Winnipeg		Hellebuyck	Canada Life Centre	14,373	15–22–5	35	
43	January 9	Los Angeles	1–5	Winnipeg		Comrie	Canada Life Centre	14,412	16–22–5	37	
44	January 11	New Jersey	3–4	Winnipeg		Hellebuyck	Canada Life Centre	14,165	17–22–5	39	
45	January 13	NY Islanders	4–5	Winnipeg		Hellebuyck	Canada Life Centre	14,114	18–22–5	41	
46	January 15	Winnipeg	6–2	Minnesota		Hellebuyck	Grand Casino Arena	18,275	19–22–5	43	
47	January 17	Toronto	4–3	Winnipeg	OT	Hellebuyck	Canada Life Centre	15,225	19–22–6	44	
48	January 19	Winnipeg	0–2	Chicago		Hellebuyck	United Center	19,894	19–23–6	44	
49	January 20	St. Louis	1–3	Winnipeg		Comrie	Canada Life Centre	13,661	20–23–6	46	
50	January 22	Florida	2–1	Winnipeg	SO	Hellebuyck	Canada Life Centre	14,106	20–23–7	47	
51	January 24	Detroit	5–1	Winnipeg		Hellebuyck	Canada Life Centre	15,225	20–24–7	47	
52	January 27	Winnipeg	4–3	New Jersey		Hellebuyck	Prudential Center	15,454	21–24–7	49	
53	January 29	Winnipeg	1–4	Tampa Bay		Hellebuyck	Benchmark International Arena	19,092	21–25–7	49	
54	January 31	Winnipeg	2–1	Florida		Comrie	Amerant Bank Arena	19,895	22–25–7	51	

February: 1–1–2 (home: 0–1–0; road: 1–0–2)

Game	Date	Visitor	Score	Home	OT	Decision	Location	Attendance	Record	Points	Recap
55	February 2	Winnipeg	3–4	Dallas	OT	Hellebuyck	American Airlines Center	18,532	22–25–8	52	
56	February 4	Montreal	5–1	Winnipeg		Hellebuyck	Canada Life Centre	15,225	22–26–8	52	
57	February 25	Winnipeg	3–2	Vancouver	OT	Comrie	Rogers Arena	18,139	23–26–8	54	
58	February 27	Winnipeg	4–5	Anaheim	OT	Hellebuyck	Honda Center	16,000	23–26–9	55	

March: 9–4–3 (home: 6–3–1; road: 3–1–2)

Game	Date	Visitor	Score	Home	OT	Decision	Location	Attendance	Record	Points	Recap
59	March 1	Winnipeg	1–2	San Jose	OT	Hellebuyck	SAP Center	17,435	23–26–10	56	
60	March 3	Chicago	2–3	Winnipeg	OT	Hellebuyck	Canada Life Centre	13,929	24–26–10	58	
61	March 5	Tampa Bay	1–4	Winnipeg		Hellebuyck	Canada Life Centre	13,473	25–26–10	60	
62	March 7	Vancouver	2–3	Winnipeg	OT	Hellebuyck	Canada Life Centre	14,294	26–26–10	62	
63	March 10	Anaheim	4–1	Winnipeg		Hellebuyck	Canada Life Centre	13,249	26–27–10	62	
64	March 12	NY Rangers	6–3	Winnipeg		Hellebuyck	Canada Life Centre	13,763	26–28–10	62	
65	March 14	Colorado	1–3	Winnipeg		Hellebuyck	Canada Life Centre	14,756	27–28–10	64	
66	March 15	St. Louis	2–3	Winnipeg		Comrie	Canada Life Centre	14,082	28–28–10	66	
67	March 17	Nashville	4–3	Winnipeg	SO	Hellebuyck	Canada Life Centre	13,559	28–28–11	67	
68	March 19	Winnipeg	1–6	Boston		Hellebuyck	TD Garden	17,850	28–29–11	67	
69	March 21	Winnipeg	4–5	Pittsburgh	SO	Hellebuyck	PPG Paints Arena	18,360	28–29–12	68	
70	March 22	Winnipeg	3–2	NY Rangers	SO	Comrie	Madison Square Garden	17,349	29–29–12	70	
71	March 24	Vegas	1–4	Winnipeg		Hellebuyck	Canada Life Centre	13,478	30–29–12	72	
72	March 26	Colorado	3–2	Winnipeg		Hellebuyck	Canada Life Centre	14,357	30–30–12	72	
73	March 28	Winnipeg	4–2	Colorado		Hellebuyck	Ball Arena	18,149	31–30–12	74	
74	March 31	Winnipeg	4–3	Chicago	OT	Hellebuyck	United Center	18,726	32–30–12	76	

April: 3–5–0 (home: 1–2–0; road: 2–3–0)

Game	Date	Visitor	Score	Home	OT	Decision	Location	Attendance	Record	Points	Recap
75	April 2	Winnipeg	0–3	Dallas		Hellebuyck	American Airlines Center	18,532	32–31–12	76	
76	April 4	Winnipeg	2–1	Columbus		Hellebuyck	Nationwide Arena	18,272	33–31–12	78	
77	April 6	Seattle	2–6	Winnipeg		Hellebuyck	Canada Life Centre	14,430	34–31–12	80	
78	April 9	Winnipeg	3–2	St. Louis		Hellebuyck	Enterprise Center	18,096	35–31–12	82	
79	April 11	Philadelphia	7–1	Winnipeg		Hellebuyck	Canada Life Centre	15,225	35–32–12	82	
80	April 13	Winnipeg	2–6	Vegas		Hellebuyck	T-Mobile Arena	17,936	35–33–12	82	
81	April 14	Winnipeg	3–5	Utah		Comrie	Delta Center	12,478	35–34–12	82	
82	April 16	San Jose	6–1	Winnipeg		Comrie	Canada Life Centre	15,225	35–35–12	82	

Win (2 Points) Loss (0 points) Overtime/shootout loss (1 point)

== Player statistics ==
Key:

† Denotes player spent time with another team before joining the Jets. Stats reflect time with the Jets only.
‡ Denotes player was traded mid-season. Stats reflect time with the Jets only.

=== Skaters ===
Regular season
Player	GP	G	A	Pts	+/−	PIM
Mark Scheifele	82	36	67	103	0	43
Kyle Connor	82	39	53	92	–2	16
Gabriel Vilardi	82	33	39	72	–12	24
Josh Morrissey	77	19	52	71	6	30
Cole Perfetti	68	19	36	55	16	20
Alex Iafallo	79	17	37	54	3	14
Jonathan Toews	82	11	18	29	–20	38
Morgan Barron	65	11	12	23	5	31
Logan Stanley^{‡}	59	9	12	21	–2	99
Adam Lowry	70	5	16	21	–6	32
Nino Niederreiter	61	8	11	19	–7	18
Dylan DeMelo	82	3	16	19	7	40
Cole Koepke	66	8	9	17	1	16
Vladislav Namestnikov	60	8	6	14	–13	28
Dylan Samberg	66	1	13	14	5	14
Tanner Pearson^{‡}	52	7	6	13	7	25
Neal Pionk	51	3	9	12	1	37
Gustav Nyquist	51	1	11	12	–8	10
Luke Schenn^{‡}	46	1	6	7	–11	32
Brad Lambert	25	3	3	6	–5	6
Elias Salomonsson	32	1	4	5	–6	12
Haydn Fleury	38	2	2	4	–18	12
Isak Rosen^{†}	21	3	0	3	–2	0
Jacob Bryson^{†}	15	0	3	3	–8	2
Colin Miller	18	0	2	12	–8	6
Danil Zhilkin	6	0	1	1	3	0
Parker Ford	15	0	1	1	–2	4
Ville Heinola	5	0	0	0	0	0
Isaak Phillips	3	0	0	0	0	2
Walker Duehr	3	0	0	0	–1	0
Nikita Chibrikov	11	0	0	0	0	14
Brayden Yager	3	0	0	0	0	2

=== Goaltenders ===
Regular season
Player	GP	GS	TOI	W	L	OT	GA	GAA	SA	SV%	SO	G	A	PIM
Connor Hellebuyck	57	57	3401:27	23	23	11	162	2.86	1547	.895	0	0	0	4
Eric Comrie	25	24	1381:30	12	11	1	72	3.13	654	.890	0	0	0	0
Thomas Milic	3	1	138:38	0	1	0	8	3.46	62	.871	0	0	0	2

== Transactions ==
The Jets have been involved in the following transactions during the 2025–26 season.

Key:

† Contract is entry-level.
‡ Contract initially takes effect in the 2026–27 season.

=== Trades ===
Date	Details		Ref
March 6, 2026	To Buffalo Sabres Luke Schenn* (Note: Winnipeg retained 50% of Schenn's contract.); Logan Stanley	To Winnipeg Jets Jacob Bryson; Isak Rosen conditional (Note: Winnipeg will receive the higher of Buffalo or Edmonton's fourth-round picks in 2026.) BUF 4th-round pick in 2026 or EDM 4th-round pick in 2026; 2nd-round pick in 2027	
March 6, 2026	To Buffalo Sabres Tanner Pearson	To Winnipeg Jets 7th-round pick in 2026	
June 29, 2026	To Pittsburgh Penguins David Gustafsson	To Winnipeg Jets Jack St. Ivany	

=== Players acquired ===
Date	Player	Former team	Term	Via	Ref
July 1, 2025	Cole Koepke	Boston Bruins	1-year	Free agency	
July 1, 2025	Tanner Pearson	Vegas Golden Knights	1-year	Free agency	
July 1, 2025	Jonathan Toews	Chicago Blackhawks	1-year	Free agency	
July 2, 2025	Kale Clague	Buffalo Sabres	1-year	Free agency	
July 2, 2025	Phillip Di Giuseppe	Vancouver Canucks	1-year	Free agency	
July 2, 2025	Walker Duehr	San Jose Sharks	1-year	Free agency	
July 2, 2025	Samuel Fagemo	Los Angeles Kings	1-year	Free agency	
July 2, 2025	Gustav Nyquist	Minnesota Wild	1-year	Free agency	
July 2, 2025	Isaac Poulter	New Jersey Devils	1-year	Free agency	

=== Players lost ===
Date	Player	New team	Term	Via	Ref
July 1, 2025	Dylan Coghlan	Vegas Golden Knights	1-year	Free agency	
July 1, 2025	Simon Lundmark	Tampa Bay Lightning	2-year	Free agency	
July 1, 2025	Brandon Tanev	Utah Mammoth	3-year	Free agency	
July 1, 2025	Dominic Toninato	Chicago Blackhawks	2-year	Free agency	
July 2, 2025	Mason Appleton	Detroit Red Wings	2-year	Free agency	
July 3, 2025	Nikolaj Ehlers	Carolina Hurricanes	6-year	Free agency	
June 19, 2026	Jonathan Toews			Retirement	

=== Signings ===
Date	Player	Term	Ref
June 14, 2025	Alfons Freij	3-year†	
June 28, 2025	Haydn Fleury	2-year	
July 3, 2025	Mason Shaw	1-year	
July 11, 2025	Isaak Phillips	2-year	
July 18, 2025	Gabriel Vilardi	6-year	
October 5, 2025	Nikita Chibrikov	2-year	
October 8, 2025	Kyle Connor	8-year‡	
November 19, 2025	Adam Lowry	5-year‡	
March 25, 2026	Lucas Wahlin	1-year‡	
June 15, 2026	Walker Duehr	2-year	
June 18, 2026	Isaac Poulter	1-year	
June 24, 2026	Isak Rosén	2-year	

== Draft picks ==
Below are the Winnipeg Jets' selections at the 2025 NHL entry draft, which was held on June 27 to 28, 2025, at Peacock Theater in Los Angeles, California.

Round	#	Player	Pos.	Nationality	Team (League)
1	28	Sascha Boumedienne	D	Sweden	Boston University Terriers (Hockey East)
3	92	Owen Martin	C	Canada	Spokane Chiefs (WHL)
5	156	Viktor Klingsell	RW	Sweden	Skellefteå AIK J20 (J20 Nationell)
6	188	Edison Engle	D	United States	Des Moines Buccaneers (USHL)
7	220	Jacob Cloutier	RW	Canada	Saginaw Spirit (OHL)
