= 2025–26 Colorado Avalanche season =

National Hockey League season

2025–26 Colorado Avalanche
- Presidents' Trophy winners
- Central Division champions
- Division: 1st Central
- Conference: 1st Western
- 2025–26 record: 55–16–11
- Home record: 25–9–6
- Road record: 27–7–5
- Goals for: 302
- Goals against: 203

Team information
- General manager: Chris MacFarland
- Coach: Jared Bednar
- Captain: Gabriel Landeskog
- Alternate captains: Nathan MacKinnon; Cale Makar
- Arena: Ball Arena
- Minor league affiliates: Colorado Eagles (AHL); Utah Grizzlies (ECHL)

Team leaders
- Goals: Nathan MacKinnon (53)
- Assists: Nathan MacKinnon (74)
- Points: Nathan MacKinnon (127)
- Penalty minutes: Josh Manson (91)
- Plus/minus: Nathan MacKinnon (+57)
- Wins: Scott Wedgewood (29)
- Goals against average: Trent Miner (2.03)

The 2025–26 Colorado Avalanche season was the 47th season for the Avalanche as the National Hockey League (NHL) franchise that joined the league in 1979, and their 30th playing season since the franchise relocated from Quebec City to Denver before the start of the 1995–96 season. To commemorate the previous iteration of the franchise, the Avalanche wore Quebec Nordiques jerseys in eight games in 2025–26 as part of the franchise's 30th season.

After a 3–0 victory against the Nashville Predators on November 22, 2025, and a 1–0 victory over the Chicago Blackhawks on November 23, the Avalanche recorded back-to-back shutouts on consecutive days for the first time in franchise history.

Following a win over the Vancouver Canucks on December 2, and having compiled an 19–1–6 record, the Avalanche joined the 1979–80 Philadelphia Flyers as the only two teams in NHL history with one regulation loss through 26 games.

After a 5–3 comeback win over the Carolina Hurricanes on January 3, 2026, the Avalanche became the first team in NHL history to have only two regulation losses in the first 40 games.

On March 20, the Avalanche became the first team to qualify for the Stanley Cup playoffs following a 4–1 win over the Chicago Blackhawks, making it to the postseason for the ninth consecutive season. With the Toronto Maple Leafs missing the playoffs for the first time since 2015–16, the Avalanche alongside the Tampa Bay Lightning now hold the longest active playoff streak in the NHL.

In the playoffs, the Avalanche swept the Los Angeles Kings in the first round, and defeated the Minnesota Wild in five games in the second round. They entered the Western Conference final as heavy favorites against the Vegas Golden Knights, who only won 39 games in the regular season. However, the series quickly became a disaster for Colorado (including a blown three-goal lead in game 3) as Vegas upset the Avalanche in a sweep and advanced to the 2026 Stanley Cup Final.

== Standings ==
=== Divisional standings ===
Central Division
Pos	Team	GP	W	L	OTL	RW	GF	GA	GD	Pts
1	p – Colorado Avalanche	82	55	16	11	48	302	203	+99	121
2	x – Dallas Stars	82	50	20	12	38	279	226	+53	112
3	x – Minnesota Wild	82	46	24	12	31	272	240	+32	104
4	x – Utah Mammoth	82	43	33	6	33	268	240	+28	92
5	St. Louis Blues	82	37	33	12	33	231	258	−27	86
6	Nashville Predators	82	38	34	10	28	247	269	−22	86
7	Winnipeg Jets	82	35	35	12	28	231	260	−29	82
8	Chicago Blackhawks	82	29	39	14	21	213	275	−62	72

Source: National Hockey League
Rules for classification: 1) Fewer number of games played (GP, only during regular season); 2) Greater number of regulation wins (RW); 3) Greater number of wins in regulation and overtime, excluding shootout wins (ROW); 4) Greater number of total wins, including shootouts (W); 5) Greater number of points earned in head-to-head play; if teams played an uneven number of head-to-head games, the result of the first game on the home ice of the team with the extra home game is discarded; 6) Greater goal differential (GD); 7) Greater number of goals scored (GF)
p – Clinched Presidents' Trophy; x – Clinched playoff spot

=== Conference standings ===
Western Conference Wild Card
Pos	Div	Team	GP	W	L	OTL	RW	GF	GA	GD	Pts
1	CE	x – Utah Mammoth	82	43	33	6	33	268	240	+28	92
2	PA	x – Los Angeles Kings	82	35	27	20	22	225	247	−22	90
3	CE	St. Louis Blues	82	37	33	12	33	231	258	−27	86
4	CE	Nashville Predators	82	38	34	10	28	247	269	−22	86
5	PA	San Jose Sharks	82	39	35	8	27	251	292	−41	86
6	CE	Winnipeg Jets	82	35	35	12	28	231	260	−29	82
7	PA	Seattle Kraken	82	34	37	11	26	226	263	−37	79
8	PA	Calgary Flames	82	34	39	9	27	212	259	−47	77
9	CE	Chicago Blackhawks	82	29	39	14	22	213	275	−62	72
10	PA	Vancouver Canucks	82	25	49	8	15	216	316	−100	58

Source: National Hockey League
Rules for classification: 1) Fewer number of games played (GP, only during regular season); 2) Greater number of regulation wins (RW); 3) Greater number of wins in regulation and overtime, excluding shootout wins (ROW); 4) Greater number of total wins, including shootouts (W); 5) Greater number of points earned in head-to-head play; if teams played an uneven number of head-to-head games, the result of the first game on the home ice of the team with the extra home game is discarded; 6) Greater goal differential (GD); 7) Greater number of goals scored (GF)
x – Clinched playoff spot

== Schedule and results ==
=== Preseason ===
The Avalanche's preseason schedule was released on June 20, 2025.

2025 preseason game log: 4–2–0 (home: 3–0–0; road: 1–2–0)

#	Date	Visitor	Score	Home	OT	Decision	Arena	Attendance	Record	Recap
1^{A}	September 21	Colorado	5–1	Utah		Posch	Magness Arena	6,315	1–0–0	
2^{A}	September 21	Utah	2–3	Colorado		Keyser	Ball Arena	12,869	2–0–0	
3	September 27	Dallas	1–4	Colorado		Miner	Ball Arena	15,389	3–0–0	
4	September 30	Vegas	2–4	Colorado		Miner	Ball Arena	13,150	4–0–0	
5	October 1	Colorado	1–2	Vegas		Wedgewood	T-Mobile Arena	17,409	4–1–0	
6	October 4	Colorado	2–3	Dallas		Wedgewood	American Airlines Center	16,376	4–2–0	

Legend

Win Loss OT/SO Loss ^{A} – Split Squad

=== Regular season ===
The regular season schedule was released on July 16, 2025.

2025–26 game log

October: 7–1–4 (home: 3–0–2; road: 4–1–2)
#	Date	Opponent	Score	OT	Decision	Attendance	Record	Pts	Recap
1	October 7	@ Los Angeles	4–1		Wedgewood	18,145	1–0–0	2
2	October 9	Utah	2–1		Wedgewood	18,087	2–0–0	4
3	October 11	Dallas	4–5	SO	Wedgewood	18,129	2–0–1	5
4	October 13	@ Buffalo	3–1		Wedgewood	16,462	3–0–1	7
5	October 16	@ Columbus	4–1		Wedgewood	17,249	4–0–1	9
6	October 18	Boston	4–1		Wedgewood	18,131	5–0–1	11
7	October 21	@ Utah	3–4	OT	Wedgewood	12,478	5–0–2	12
8	October 23	Carolina	4–5	SO	Miner	18,092	5–0–3	13
9	October 25	@ Boston	2–3		Wedgewood	17,850	5–1–3	13
10	October 26	@ New Jersey	3–4	OT	Miner	16,514	5–1–4	14
11	October 28	New Jersey	8–4		Wedgewood	18,095	6–1–4	16
12	October 31	@ Vegas	4–2		Wedgewood	17,889	7–1–4	18

November: 11–0–2 (home: 7–0–0; road: 4–0–2)
#	Date	Opponent	Score	OT	Decision	Attendance	Record	Pts	Recap
13	November 1	@ San Jose	2–3	OT	Blackwood	16,406	7–1–5	19
14	November 4	Tampa Bay	3–2		Wedgewood	18,071	8–1–5	21
15	November 8	@ Edmonton	9–1		Wedgewood	18,347	9–1–5	23
16	November 9	@ Vancouver	5–4	OT	Blackwood	18,643	10–1–5	25
17	November 11	Anaheim	4–1		Wedgewood	18,098	11–1–5	27
18	November 13	Buffalo	6–3		Blackwood	18,101	12–1–5	29
19	November 16	NY Islanders	4–1		Wedgewood	18,109	13–1–5	31
20	November 20	NY Rangers	6–3		Wedgewood	18,080	14–1–5	33
21	November 22	@ Nashville	3–0		Blackwood	17,457	15–1–5	35
22	November 23	@ Chicago	1–0		Wedgewood	20,441	16–1–5	37
23	November 26	San Jose	6–0		Blackwood	18,117	17–1–5	39
24	November 28	@ Minnesota	2–3	SO	Wedgewood	19,044	17–1–6	40
25	November 29	Montreal	7–2		Blackwood	18,112	18–1–6	42

December: 12–1–1 (home: 7–0–0; road: 5–1–1)
#	Date	Opponent	Score	OT	Decision	Attendance	Record	Pts	Recap
26	December 2	Vancouver	3–1		Blackwood	18,103	19–1–6	44
27	December 4	@ NY Islanders	3–6		Blackwood	14,497	19–2–6	44
28	December 6	@ NY Rangers	3–2	OT	Blackwood	17,647	20–2–6	46
29	December 7	@ Philadelphia	3–2		Blackwood	18,606	21–2–6	48
30	December 9	@ Nashville	3–4	SO	Wedgewood	17,159	21–2–7	49
31	December 11	Florida	6–2		Blackwood	18,112	22–2–7	51
32	December 13	Nashville	4–2		Wedgewood	18,130	23–2–7	53
33	December 16	@ Seattle	5–3		Blackwood	17,151	24–2–7	55
34	December 19	Winnipeg	3–2		Wedgewood	18,098	25–2–7	57
35	December 21	@ Minnesota	5–1		Blackwood	19,146	26–2–7	59
36	December 23	Utah	1–0		Wedgewood	18,127	27–2–7	61
37	December 27	@ Vegas	6–5	SO	Wedgewood	18,168	28–2–7	63
38	December 29	Los Angeles	5–2		Blackwood	18,143	29–2–7	65
39	December 31	St. Louis	6–1		Blackwood	18,149	30–2–7	67

January: 6–6–2 (home: 3–2–2; road: 3–4–0)
#	Date	Opponent	Score	OT	Decision	Attendance	Record	Pts	Recap
40	January 3	@ Carolina	5–3		Wedgewood	18,351	31–2–7	69
41	January 4	@ Florida	1–2		Wedgewood	19,654	31–3–7	69
42	January 6	@ Tampa Bay	2–4		Wedgewood	19,092	31–4–7	69
43	January 8	Ottawa	8–2		Wedgewood	18,092	32–4–7	71
44	January 10	Columbus	4–0		Miner	18,127	33–4–7	73
45	January 12	Toronto	3–4	OT	Miner	18,084	33–4–8	74
46	January 16	Nashville	3–7		Blackwood	18,143	33–5–8	74
47	January 19	Washington	5–2		Wedgewood	18,136	34–5–8	76
48	January 21	Anaheim	2–1	SO	Wedgewood	18,109	34–5–9	77
49	January 23	Philadelphia	3–7		Blackwood	18,141	34–6–9	77
50	January 25	@ Toronto	4–1		Blackwood	18,348	35–6–9	79
51	January 28	@ Ottawa	2–5		Blackwood	17,007	35–7–9	79
52	January 29	@ Montreal	3–7		Wedgewood	20,962	35–8–9	79
53	January 31	@ Detroit	5–0		Blackwood	19,515	36–8–9	81

February: 3–2–0 (home: 2–2–0; road: 1–0–0)
#	Date	Opponent	Score	OT	Decision	Attendance	Record	Pts	Recap
54	February 2	Detroit	0–2		Blackwood	18,145	36–9–9	81
55	February 4	San Jose	4–2		Blackwood	18,136	37–9–9	83
56	February 25	@ Utah	4–2		Wedgewood	12,478	38–9–9	85
57	February 26	Minnesota	2–5		Blackwood	18,148	38–10–9	85
58	February 28	Chicago	3–1		Blackwood	18,152	39–10–9	87

March: 10–4–1 (home: 2–3–1; road: 8–1–0)
#	Date	Opponent	Score	OT	Decision	Attendance	Record	Pts	Recap
59	March 2	@ Los Angeles	4–2		Blackwood	15,492	40–10–9	89
60	March 3	@ Anaheim	5–1		Wedgewood	14,369	41–10–9	91
61	March 6	@ Dallas	5–4	SO	Wedgewood	18,532	42–10–9	93
62	March 8	Minnesota	3–2	SO	Wedgewood	18,148	43–10–9	95
63	March 10	Edmonton	3–4		Blackwood	18,122	43–11–9	95
64	March 12	@ Seattle	5–1		Wedgewood	17,151	44–11–9	97
65	March 14	@ Winnipeg	1–3		Blackwood	14,756	44–12–9	97
66	March 16	Pittsburgh	2–7		Wedgewood	18,121	44–13–9	97
67	March 18	Dallas	1–2	SO	Wedgewood	18,146	44–13–10	98
68	March 20	@ Chicago	4–1		Blackwood	20,539	45–13–10	100
69	March 22	@ Washington	3–2	OT	Blackwood	18,347	46–13–10	102
70	March 24	@ Pittsburgh	6–2		Wedgewood	18,307	47–13–10	104
71	March 26	@ Winnipeg	3–2		Blackwood	14,357	48–13–10	106
72	March 28	Winnipeg	2–4		Wedgewood	18,149	48–14–10	106
73	March 30	Calgary	9–2		Wedgewood	18,097	49–14–10	108

April: 6–2–1 (home: 2–2–1; road: 4–0–0)
#	Date	Opponent	Score	OT	Decision	Attendance	Record	Pts	Recap
74	April 1	Vancouver	6–8		Wedgewood	18,103	49–15–10	108
75	April 4	@ Dallas	2–0		Wedgewood	18,532	50–15–10	110
76	April 5	St. Louis	2–3		Blackwood	18,101	50–16–10	110
77	April 7	@ St. Louis	3–1		Wedgewood	18,096	51–16–10	112
78	April 9	Calgary	3–1		Blackwood	18,146	52–16–10	114
79	April 11	Vegas	2–3	OT	Blackwood	18,152	52–16–11	115
80	April 13	@ Edmonton	2–1	SO	Wedgewood	18,347	53–16–11	117
81	April 14	@ Calgary	3–1		Blackwood	17,560	54–16–11	119
82	April 16	Seattle	2–0		Wedgewood	18,155	55–16–11	121

Legend: Win (2 points) Loss (0 points) OT/SO loss (1 point)

=== Playoffs ===
2026 Stanley Cup playoffs

Western Conference first round vs (WC2) Los Angeles Kings: Colorado won 4–0
#	Date	Opponent	Score	OT	Decision	Attendance	Series	Recap
1	April 19	Los Angeles	2–1		Wedgewood	18,101	1–0
2	April 21	Los Angeles	2–1	OT	Wedgewood	18,142	2–0
3	April 23	@ Los Angeles	4–2		Wedgewood	18,145	3–0
4	April 26	@ Los Angeles	5–1		Wedgewood	18,145	4–0

Western Conference second round vs (C3) Minnesota Wild: Colorado won 4–1
#	Date	Opponent	Score	OT	Decision	Attendance	Series	Recap
1	May 3	Minnesota	9–6		Wedgewood	18,148	1–0
2	May 5	Minnesota	5–2		Wedgewood	18,154	2–0
3	May 9	@ Minnesota	1–5		Wedgewood	19,236	2–1
4	May 11	@ Minnesota	5–2		Blackwood	19,136	3–1
5	May 13	Minnesota	4–3	OT	Wedgewood	18,159	4–1

Western Conference final vs (P1) Vegas Golden Knights: Vegas won 4–0
#	Date	Opponent	Score	OT	Decision	Attendance	Series	Recap
1	May 20	Vegas	2–4		Wedgewood	18,109	0–1
2	May 22	Vegas	1–3		Wedgewood	18,147	0–2
3	May 24	@ Vegas	3–5		Wedgewood	18,212	0–3
4	May 26	@ Vegas	1–2		Blackwood	18,188	0–4

Legend: Win Loss

== Player statistics ==
As of May 26, 2026

=== Skaters ===
Regular season
Player	GP	G	A	Pts	+/–	PIM
Nathan MacKinnon	80	53	74	127	+57	39
Martin Necas	78	38	62	100	+47	30
Cale Makar	75	20	59	79	+32	24
Brock Nelson	81	33	32	65	+15	36
Valeri Nichushkin	72	17	32	49	+9	26
Artturi Lehkonen	70	21	27	48	+32	16
Sam Malinski	82	8	32	40	+43	22
Parker Kelly	82	21	14	35	+18	30
Gabriel Landeskog	60	14	21	35	+29	47
Brent Burns	82	12	23	35	+33	32
Josh Manson	79	5	26	31	+42	91
Jack Drury	82	10	17	27	+15	31
Victor Olofsson^{†}	60	11	14	25	+6	6
Ross Colton	73	9	15	24	+9	13
Devon Toews	68	3	21	24	+37	32
Gavin Brindley	56	6	7	13	+2	8
Sam Girard^{‡}	40	3	9	12	+12	15
Zakhar Bardakov	60	1	9	10	+6	14
Nazem Kadri^{†}	16	4	5	9	−3	6
Joel Kiviranta	51	3	6	9	+7	8
Nicolas Roy^{†}	15	3	2	5	0	13
Nick Blankenburg^{†}	12	2	1	3	+1	0
Ilya Solovyov^{‡}	16	1	2	3	−1	6
Brett Kulak^{†}	27	0	3	3	+1	10
Logan O'Connor	13	0	2	2	−1	4
Jack Ahcan	11	0	2	2	+2	2
Keaton Middleton	3	0	1	1	−1	4
Alex Barre-Boulet	2	0	1	1	0	0
Tristen Nielsen	4	0	1	1	+1	0
Ivan Ivan	9	0	1	1	+1	2
T. J. Tynan	1	0	0	0	+1	0
Taylor Makar	12	0	0	0	0	4
Jason Polin	4	0	0	0	+1	0

Playoffs
Player	GP	G	A	Pts	+/–	PIM
Nathan MacKinnon	13	7	8	15	+5	6
Martin Necas	13	1	12	13	+6	6
Gabriel Landeskog	13	6	5	11	+4	14
Devon Toews	13	2	9	11	+6	2
Nazem Kadri	13	3	6	9	+1	4
Artturi Lehkonen	11	3	3	6	+8	2
Nicolas Roy	13	3	3	6	−1	4
Cale Makar	11	4	1	5	+5	4
Jack Drury	13	3	2	5	0	4
Ross Colton	11	2	3	5	−2	16
Brett Kulak	13	1	4	5	+1	6
Valeri Nichushkin	12	2	2	4	+1	0
Parker Kelly	13	2	2	4	−1	8
Brent Burns	13	0	4	4	+9	6
Brock Nelson	13	2	1	3	−1	10
Sam Malinski	11	1	2	3	+3	0
Josh Manson	9	0	3	3	−1	10
Logan O'Connor	13	1	1	2	−5	0
Nick Blankenburg	5	1	0	1	−2	2
Joel Kiviranta	5	0	0	0	+4	0
Jack Ahcan	3	0	0	0	−3	0

=== Goaltenders ===
Regular season
Player	GP	GS	TOI	W	L	OT	GA	GAA	SA	SV%	SO	G	A	PIM
Scott Wedgewood	45	43	2,549:04	31	6	6	86	2.02	1,093	.921	4	0	1	2
Mackenzie Blackwood	39	36	2,155:41	23	10	2	90	2.51	933	.904	3	0	0	0
Trent Miner	4	3	236:34	1	0	3	8	2.03	104	.933	1	0	0	0

Playoffs
Player	GP	GS	TOI	W	L	GA	GAA	SA	SV%	SO	G	A	PIM
Scott Wedgewood	11	10	606:07	7	4	25	2.47	260	.904	0	0	0	0
Mackenzie Blackwood	4	3	170:21	1	1	8	2.82	73	.890	0	0	0	0

^{†}Denotes player spent time with another team before joining the Avalanche. Stats reflect time with the Avalanche only.
^{‡}Denotes player was traded mid-season. Stats reflect time with the Avalanche only.
Bold/italics denotes franchise record.

== Transactions ==
The Avalanche have been involved in the following transactions during the 2025–26 season.

Key:

- † Contract is entry-level.
- ‡ Contract initially takes effect in the 2026–27 season.

=== Trades ===
Date	Details		Ref
June 27, 2025	To Colorado Avalanche Gavin Brindley; 3rd-round pick in 2025 conditional CBJ 2nd-round pick in 2027 or MIN 2nd-round pick in 2027	To Columbus Blue Jackets Charlie Coyle; Miles Wood	
July 25, 2025	To Colorado Avalanche Danil Gushchin	To San Jose Sharks Oskar Olausson	
January 20, 2026	To Colorado Avalanche Valtteri Puustinen; 7th-round pick in 2026	To Pittsburgh Penguins Ilya Solovyov	
February 24, 2026	To Colorado Avalanche Brett Kulak	To Pittsburgh Penguins Sam Girard; 2nd-round pick in 2028	
March 4, 2026	To Colorado Avalanche Nick Blankenburg	To Nashville Predators 5th-round pick in 2027	
March 5, 2026	To Colorado Avalanche Nicolas Roy	To Toronto Maple Leafs conditional (Note: Toronto will receive the lowest of Colorado's, Boston's, or Philadelphia's fifth-round picks in 2026.) BOS 5th-round pick in 2026 or COL 5th-round pick in 2026 or PHI 5th-round pick in 2026 conditional (Note: Toronto will receive Colorado's first-round pick in 2027 if the pick is outside of the top 10, and has not been previously conveyed to the New York Islanders per an earlier trade; otherwise, Toronto will receive Colorado's first-round pick in 2028.) 1st-round pick in 2027 or 1st-round pick in 2028	
March 6, 2026	To Colorado Avalanche Nazem Kadri* (Note: Calgary retained 20% of Kadri's contract.); 4th-round pick in 2027	To Calgary Flames Max Curran; Victor Olofsson conditional (Note: Conditions unknown.) 2nd-round pick in 2027 conditional (Note: Conditions unknown.) 1st-round pick in 2028	
June 16, 2026	To Colorado Avalanche Magnus Chrona; 3rd-round pick in 2026; COL 3rd-round pick in 2027	To Nashville Predators Ross Colton; Isak Posch	

=== Players acquired ===
Date	Player	Former team	Term	Via	Ref
July 1, 2025	Ronnie Attard	Edmonton Oilers	1-year	Free agency	
July 2, 2025	Brent Burns	Carolina Hurricanes	1-year	Free agency	
July 4, 2025	Alex Barre-Boulet	Laval Rocket (AHL)	1-year	Free agency	

=== Players lost ===
Date	Player	New team	Term	Via	Ref
July 1, 2025	Jonathan Drouin	New York Islanders	2-year	Free agency	
July 1, 2025	Ryan Lindgren	Seattle Kraken	4-year	Free agency	
July 2, 2025	Calle Rosen	Washington Capitals	1-year	Free agency	
October 1, 2025	Erik Johnson			Retirement	

=== Signings ===
Date	Player	Term	Ref
June 30, 2025	Sam Malinski	1-year	
June 30, 2025	Trent Miner	2-year	
July 1, 2025	Jack Ahcan	1-year	
July 1, 2025	Parker Kelly	4-year	
July 1, 2025	T. J. Tynan	1-year	
July 10, 2025	Josh Manson	2-year	
August 8, 2025	Joel Kiviranta	1-year	
August 18, 2025	Alex Gagne	2-year†	
August 20, 2025	Victor Olofsson	1-year	
October 27, 2025	Tristen Nielsen	2-year	
October 30, 2025	Martin Necas	8-year‡	
November 13, 2025	Scott Wedgewood	1-year	
January 27, 2026	Sam Malinski	4-year‡	
March 13, 2026	Gustav Stjernberg	2-year†‡	
March 30, 2026	Matthew DiMarsico	2-year†‡	

== Draft picks ==
Below are the Colorado Avalanche's selections at the 2025 NHL entry draft, which will be held on June 27 and 28, 2025, at the Peacock Theater in Los Angeles, California.

Round	#	Player	Pos	Nationality	College/Junior/Club team	League
3	77 (Note: The Columbus Blue Jackets' third-round pick went to the Colorado Avalanche as the result of a trade on June 27, 2025, that sent Charlie Coyle and Miles Wood to Columbus in exchange for Gavin Brindley, a conditional second-round pick in 2027 and this pick.)	Francesco Dell'Elce	D	Canada	UMass Minutemen	Hockey East
4	118	Linus Funck	D	Sweden	Luleå HF J20	J20 Nationell
7	214	Nolan Roed	C	United States	Tri-City Storm	USHL
