= 2025–26 New York Islanders season =

National Hockey League season

2025–26 New York Islanders
- Division: 6th Metropolitan
- Conference: 12th Eastern
- 2025–26 record: 43–34–5
- Home record: 22–16–2
- Road record: 21–18–3
- Goals for: 233
- Goals against: 241

Team information
- General manager: Mathieu Darche
- Coach: Patrick Roy (Oct. 9 – Apr. 5); Peter DeBoer (Apr. 5 – Apr. 14)
- Captain: Anders Lee
- Alternate captains: Bo Horvat; Kyle Palmieri; Ryan Pulock
- Arena: UBS Arena
- Minor league affiliates: Bridgeport Islanders (AHL); Worcester Railers (ECHL)

Team leaders
- Goals: Bo Horvat (31)
- Assists: Mathew Barzal (53)
- Points: Mathew Barzal (72)
- Penalty minutes: Scott Mayfield (83)
- Plus/minus: Matthew Schaefer (+13)
- Wins: Ilya Sorokin (29)
- Goals against average: Ilya Sorokin (2.68)

The 2025–26 New York Islanders season was the 54th season in the franchise's history. It was their fifth season in UBS Arena.

On April 5, 2026, head coach Patrick Roy was fired with four games remaining in the season, after a 42–31–5 start and having lost seven of the last 10 games prior to his dismissal. Veteran NHL coach Peter DeBoer was named as his replacement the same day.

On April 12, the Islanders were eliminated from playoff contention for the second consecutive season after a 4–1 loss to the Montreal Canadiens.

The main story of the season centered around rookie defenceman, Matthew Schaefer, who was drafted first overall by the team in the 2025 NHL entry draft. Schaefer finished the season with 23 goals, tying Brian Leetch's single season record for most goals scored by a rookie defenceman. This culminated in Schaefer winning the 2025-26 Calder Memorial Trophy, becoming the 1st player since Teemu Selanne in the 1992–93 season to win the award unanimously.

== Standings ==
=== Divisional standings ===
Metropolitan Division
Pos	Team	GP	W	L	OTL	RW	GF	GA	GD	Pts
1	z – Carolina Hurricanes	82	53	22	7	39	296	240	+56	113
2	x – Pittsburgh Penguins	82	41	25	16	34	293	268	+25	98
3	x – Philadelphia Flyers	82	43	27	12	27	250	243	+7	98
4	Washington Capitals	82	43	30	9	37	263	244	+19	95
5	Columbus Blue Jackets	82	40	30	12	28	253	253	0	92
6	New York Islanders	82	43	34	5	29	233	241	−8	91
7	New Jersey Devils	82	42	37	3	29	230	254	−24	87
8	New York Rangers	82	34	39	9	25	238	250	−12	77

Source: National Hockey League
Rules for classification: 1) Fewer number of games played (GP, only during regular season); 2) Greater number of regulation wins (RW); 3) Greater number of wins in regulation and overtime, excluding shootout wins (ROW); 4) Greater number of total wins, including shootouts (W); 5) Greater number of points earned in head-to-head play; if teams played an uneven number of head-to-head games, the result of the first game on the home ice of the team with the extra home game is discarded; 6) Greater goal differential (GD); 7) Greater number of goals scored (GF)
x – Clinched playoff spot; z – Clinched conference

=== Conference standings ===
Eastern Conference Wild Card
Pos	Div	Team	GP	W	L	OTL	RW	GF	GA	GD	Pts
1	AT	x – Boston Bruins	82	45	27	10	33	272	250	+22	100
2	AT	x – Ottawa Senators	82	44	27	11	38	278	246	+32	99
3	ME	Washington Capitals	82	43	30	9	37	263	244	+19	95
4	AT	Detroit Red Wings	82	41	31	10	30	241	258	−17	92
5	ME	Columbus Blue Jackets	82	40	30	12	28	253	253	0	92
6	ME	New York Islanders	82	43	34	5	29	233	241	−8	91
7	ME	New Jersey Devils	82	42	37	3	29	230	254	−24	87
8	AT	Florida Panthers	82	40	38	4	32	251	276	−25	84
9	AT	Toronto Maple Leafs	82	32	36	14	23	253	299	−46	78
10	ME	New York Rangers	82	34	39	9	25	238	250	−12	77

Source: National Hockey League
Rules for classification: 1) Fewer number of games played (GP, only during regular season); 2) Greater number of regulation wins (RW); 3) Greater number of wins in regulation and overtime, excluding shootout wins (ROW); 4) Greater number of total wins, including shootouts (W); 5) Greater number of points earned in head-to-head play; if teams played an uneven number of head-to-head games, the result of the first game on the home ice of the team with the extra home game is discarded; 6) Greater goal differential (GD); 7) Greater number of goals scored (GF)
x – Clinched playoff spot

== Schedule and results ==
=== Preseason ===
The New York Islanders preseason schedule was released on June 24, 2025.

2025 preseason game log: 2–2–2 (home: 0–1–2; road: 2–1–0)

#	Date	Visitor	Score	Home	OT	Decision	Location	Attendance	Record
1	September 21	Philadelphia	3–2	NY Islanders	SO	Gahagen	UBS Arena	8,348	0–0–1
2	September 23	NY Islanders	2–6	New Jersey		Hogberg	Prudential Center	8,076	0–1–1
3	September 25	NY Islanders	5–4	NY Rangers		Hogberg	Madison Square Garden	17,246	1–1–1
4	September 26	New Jersey	4–2	NY Islanders		Sorokin	UBS Arena	10,130	1–2–1
5	September 29	NY Rangers	2–3	NY Islanders	OT	Rittich	UBS Arena	12,877	1–2–2
6	October 2	NY Islanders	4–3	Philadelphia		Sorokin	Xfinity Mobile Arena	12,530	2–2–2

Legend:

= Win = Loss = OT/SO Loss

=== Regular season ===
The regular season schedule was published on July 16, 2025.

2025–26 game log
October: 5–5–1 (home: 3–2–0; road: 2–3–1)

#	Date	Visitor	Score	Home	OT	Decision	Location	Attendance	Record	Points	Recap
1	October 9	NY Islanders	3–4	Pittsburgh		Sorokin	PPG Paints Arena	16,107	0–1–0	0	
2	October 11	Washington	4–2	NY Islanders		Sorokin	UBS Arena	17,255	0–2–0	0	
3	October 13	Winnipeg	5–2	NY Islanders		Sorokin	UBS Arena	13,287	0–3–0	0	
4	October 16	Edmonton	2–4	NY Islanders		Rittich	UBS Arena	14,837	1–3–0	2	
5	October 18	NY Islanders	5–4	Ottawa		Sorokin	Canadian Tire Centre	15,929	2–3–0	4	
6	October 21	San Jose	3–4	NY Islanders		Sorokin	UBS Arena	15,832	3–3–0	6	
7	October 23	Detroit	2–7	NY Islanders		Rittich	UBS Arena	14,495	4–3–0	8	
8	October 25	NY Islanders	3–4	Philadelphia	SO	Sorokin	Xfinity Mobile Arena	16,640	4–3–1	9	
9	October 28	NY Islanders	2–5	Boston		Sorokin	TD Garden	17,850	4–4–1	9	
10	October 30	NY Islanders	2–6	Carolina		Rittich	Lenovo Center	18,299	4–5–1	9	
11	October 31	NY Islanders	3–1	Washington		Sorokin	Capital One Arena	16,471	5–5–1	11	

November: 8–5–2 (home: 2–4–2; road: 6–1–0)

#	Date	Visitor	Score	Home	OT	Decision	Location	Attendance	Record	Points	Recap
12	November 2	Columbus	2–3	NY Islanders		Riitich	UBS Arena	14,984	6–5–1	13	
13	November 4	Boston	4–3	NY Islanders	SO	Sorokin	UBS Arena	15,585	6–5–2	14	
14	November 7	Minnesota	5–2	NY Islanders		Riitich	UBS Arena	15,792	6–6–2	14	
15	November 8	NY Islanders	5–0	NY Rangers		Sorokin	Madison Square Garden	18,006	7–6–2	16	
16	November 10	NY Islanders	3–2	New Jersey	OT	Sorokin	Prudential Center	16,514	8–6–2	18	
17	November 13	NY Islanders	4–3	Vegas	OT	Sorokin	T-Mobile Arena	17,733	9–6–2	20	
18	November 14	NY Islanders	3–2	Utah	OT	Rittich	Delta Center	12,478	10–6–2	22	
19	November 16	NY Islanders	1–4	Colorado		Sorokin	Ball Arena	18,109	10–7–2	22	
20	November 18	NY Islanders	3–2	Dallas		Rittich	American Airlines Center	18,532	11–7–2	24	
21	November 20	NY Islanders	5–0	Detroit		Sorokin	Little Caesars Arena	18,918	12–7–2	26	
22	November 22	St. Louis	2–1	NY Islanders		Sorokin	UBS Arena	17,255	12–8–2	26	
23	November 23	Seattle	0–1	NY Islanders	SO	Rittich	UBS Arena	17,255	13–8–2	28	
24	November 26	Boston	3–1	NY Islanders		Sorokin	UBS Arena	17,255	13–9–2	28	
25	November 28	Philadelphia	4–3	NY Islanders	SO	Rittich	UBS Arena	17,255	13–9–3	29	
26	November 30	Washington	4–1	NY Islanders		Sorokin	UBS Arena	15,648	13–10–3	29	

December: 9–4–1 (home: 7–1–0; road: 2–3–1)

#	Date	Visitor	Score	Home	OT	Decision	Location	Attendance	Record	Points	Recap
27	December 2	Tampa Bay	1–2	NY Islanders		Sorokin	UBS Arena	13,014	14–10–3	31	
28	December 4	Colorado	3–6	NY Islanders		Sorokin	UBS Arena	14,497	15–10–3	33	
29	December 6	NY Islanders	2–0	Tampa Bay		Sorokin	Benchmark International Arena	19,092	16–10–3	35	
30	December 7	NY Islanders	1–4	Florida		Rittich	Amerant Bank Arena	19,334	16–11–3	35	
31	December 9	Vegas	4–5	NY Islanders	SO	Sorokin	UBS Arena	13,514	17–11–3	37	
32	December 11	Anaheim	2–5	NY Islanders		Rittich	UBS Arena	14,527	18–11–3	39	
33	December 13	Tampa Bay	2–3	NY Islanders	SO	Sorokin	UBS Arena	17,255	19–11–3	41	
34	December 16	NY Islanders	2–3	Detroit		Sorokin	Little Caesars Arena	19,515	19–12–3	41	
35	December 19	Vancouver	4–1	NY Islanders		Sorokin	UBS Arena	17,255	19–13–3	41	
36	December 20	NY Islanders	2–3	Buffalo	SO	Rittich	KeyBank Center	19,070	19–13–4	42	
37	December 23	New Jersey	1–2	NY Islanders		Rittich	UBS Arena	17,255	20–13–4	44	
38	December 27	NY Rangers	0–2	NY Islanders		Rittich	UBS Arena	17,255	21–13–4	46	
39	December 28	NY Islanders	2–4	Columbus		Rittich	Nationwide Arena	18,223	21–14–4	46	
40	December 30	NY Islanders	3–2	Chicago	SO	Rittich	United Center	19,603	22–14–4	48	

January: 8–6–1 (home: 3–3–0; road: 5–3–1)

#	Date	Visitor	Score	Home	OT	Decision	Location	Attendance	Record	Points	Recap
41	January 1	Utah	7–2	NY Islanders		Rittich	UBS Arena	17,255	22–15–14	48	
42	January 3	Toronto	3–4	NY Islanders	OT	Rittich	UBS Arena	17,255	23–15–4	50	
43	January 6	New Jersey	0–9	NY Islanders		Sorokin	UBS Arena	17,255	24–15–4	52	
44	January 8	NY Islanders	1–2	Nashville	SO	Rittich	Bridgestone Arena	17,159	24–15–5	53	
45	January 10	NY Islanders	4–3	Minnesota	OT	Sorokin	Grand Casino Arena	19,036	25–15–5	55	
46	January 13	NY Islanders	4–5	Winnipeg		Sorokin	Canada Life Centre	14,114	25–16–5	55	
47	January 15	NY Islanders	1–0	Edmonton		Sorokin	Rogers Place	18,144	26–16–5	57	
48	January 17	NY Islanders	2–4	Calgary		Rittich	Scotiabank Saddledome	17,358	26–17–5	57	
49	January 19	NY Islanders	4–3	Vancouver		Sorokin	Rogers Arena	18,503	27–17–5	59	
50	January 21	NY Islanders	1–4	Seattle		Sorokin	Climate Pledge Arena	17,151	27–18–5	59	
51	January 24	Buffalo	5–0	NY Islanders		Rittich	UBS Arena	17,255	27–19–5	59	
52	January 26	NY Islanders	4–0	Philadelphia		Sorokin	Xfinity Mobile Arena	17,942	28–19–5	61	
53	January 28	NY Rangers	2–5	NY Islanders		Rittich	UBS Arena	17,255	29–19–5	63	
54	January 29	NY Islanders	2–1	NY Rangers		Sorokin	Madison Square Garden	18,006	30–19–5	65	
55	January 31	Nashville	4–3	NY Islanders		Sorokin	UBS Arena	17,255	30–20–5	65	

February: 4–1–0 (home: 1–0–0; road: 3–1–0)

#	Date	Visitor	Score	Home	OT	Decision	Location	Attendance	Record	Points	Recap
56	February 2	NY Islanders	1–4	Washington		Rittich	Capital One Arena	17,545	30–21–5	65	
57	February 3	Pittsburgh	4–5	NY Islanders	OT	Sorokin	UBS Arena	17,255	31–21–5	67	
58	February 5	NY Islanders	3–1	New Jersey		Sorokin	Prudential Center	16,514	32–21–5	69	
59	February 26	NY Islanders	4–3	Montreal	OT	Sorokin	Bell Centre	20,962	33–21–5	71	
60	February 28	NY Islanders	4-3	Columbus	OT	Sorokin	Nationwide Arena	18,925	34–21–5	73	

March: 8–8–0 (home: 5–3–0; road: 3–5–0)

#	Date	Visitor	Score	Home	OT	Decision	Location	Attendance	Record	Points	Recap
61	March 1	Florida	4–5	NY Islanders		Rittich	UBS Arena	17,255	35–21–5	75	
62	March 4	NY Islanders	1–5	Anaheim		Rittich	Honda Center	14,196	35–22–5	75	
63	March 5	NY Islanders	3–5	Los Angeles		Sorokin	Crypto.com Arena	17,078	35–23–5	75	
64	March 7	NY Islanders	2–1	San Jose	OT	Sorokin	SAP Center	17,435	36–23–5	77	
65	March 10	NY Islanders	4–3	St. Louis	OT	Sorokin	Enterprise Center	18,096	37–23–5	79	
66	March 13	Los Angeles	3–2	NY Islanders		Sorokin	UBS Arena	17,255	37–24–5	79	
67	March 14	Calgary	2–3	NY Islanders		Rittich	UBS Arena	17,255	38–24–5	81	
68	March 17	NY Islanders	3–1	Toronto		Sorokin	Scotiabank Arena	18,949	39–24–5	83	
69	March 19	NY Islanders	2–3	Ottawa		Sorokin	Canadian Tire Centre	16,785	39–25–5	83	
70	March 21	NY Islanders	3–7	Montreal		Sorokin	Bell Centre	20,962	39–26–5	83	
71	March 22	Columbus	0–1	NY Islanders		Sorokin	UBS Arena	17,255	40–26–5	85	
72	March 24	Chicago	4–3	NY Islanders		Sorokin	UBS Arena	17,255	40–27–5	85	
73	March 26	Dallas	1–2	NY Islanders		Sorokin	UBS Arena	17,255	41–27–5	87	
74	March 28	Florida	2–5	NY Islanders		Sorokin	UBS Arena	17,225	42–27–5	89	
75	March 30	Pittsburgh	8–3	NY Islanders		Sorokin	UBS Arena	17,255	42–28–5	89	
76	March 31	NY Islanders	3–4	Buffalo		Sorokin	KeyBank Center	19,070	42–29–5	89	

April: 1–5–0 (home: 1–4–0; road: 0–1–0)

#	Date	Visitor	Score	Home	OT	Decision	Location	Attendance	Record	Points	Recap
77	April 3	Philadelphia	4–1	NY Islanders		Sorokin	UBS Arena	17,255	42–30–5	89	
78	April 4	NY Islanders	3–4	Carolina		Sorokin	Lenovo Center	18,567	42–31–5	89	
79	April 9	Toronto	3–5	NY Islanders		Sorokin	UBS Arena	17,255	43–31–5	91	
80	April 11	Ottawa	3–0	NY Islanders		Sorokin	UBS Arena	17,255	43–32–5	91	
81	April 12	Montreal	4–1	NY Islanders		Sorokin	UBS Arena	16,918	43–33–5	91	
82	April 14	Carolina	2–1	NY Islanders		Rittich	UBS Arena	15,231	43–34–5	91	

Legend: Win (2 points) Loss (0 points) OT/SO loss (1 point)

== Player statistics ==
=== Skaters ===
Regular season
Player	GP	G	A	Pts	+/−	PIM
Mathew Barzal	81	19	53	72	10	61
Matthew Schaefer	82	23	36	59	13	38
Bo Horvat	68	31	26	57	8	40
Anders Lee	82	19	23	42	0	44
Simon Holmstrom	79	19	22	41	4	16
Jean-Gabriel Pageau	74	17	18	35	0	4
Tony DeAngelo	76	5	30	35	-5	43
Emil Heineman	82	22	9	31	–13	18
Calum Ritchie	65	13	17	30	–14	22
Anthony Duclair	62	12	15	27	0	12
Ryan Pulock	76	3	24	27	9	16
Jonathan Drouin^{‡}	55	3	18	21	–3	19
Casey Cizikas	81	10	8	18	-3	20
Kyle Palmieri	25	6	12	18	–2	8
Maxim Shabanov	44	5	13	18	–5	2
Adam Pelech	82	4	12	16	4	50
Scott Mayfield	80	2	13	15	–11	83
Brayden Schenn^{†}	19	6	5	11	–5	19
Marc Gatcomb	49	3	4	7	-3	10
Kyle MacLean	59	2	5	7	–6	40
Ondrej Palat^{†}	29	1	4	5	-6	2
Carson Soucy^{†}	30	2	2	4	–10	20
Adam Boqvist	28	0	4	4	–9	8
Marshall Warren	8	0	3	3	0	4
Maxim Tsyplakov^{‡}	27	1	1	2	–9	6
Travis Mitchell	9	1	0	1	0	6
Alexander Romanov	15	0	1	1	–7	6
Isaiah George	2	0	1	1	0	0
Victor Eklund	1	0	1	1	0	0
Liam Foudy	1	0	0	0	0	0
Cole McWard	3	0	0	0	1	0

=== Goaltenders ===
Regular season
Player	GP	GS	TOI	W	L	OT	GA	GAA	SA	SV%	SO	G	A	PIM
Ilya Sorokin	55	54	3226:10	29	24	2	144	2.68	1530	.906	7	0	1	4
David Rittich	30	28	1651:21	14	10	3	76	2.76	720	.894	2	0	0	0
Marcus Hogberg	1	0	13:29	0	0	0	2	8.90	7	.714	0	0	0	0

- ^{†} Denotes player spent time with another team before joining the Islanders. Stats reflect time with the Islanders only.
- ^{‡} Denotes player was traded mid-season. Stats reflect time with the Islanders only.
- Bold/italics denotes franchise record.

== Awards and honors ==
=== Awards ===
Regular season
Player	Award	Date
Matthew Schaefer	Calder Memorial Trophy	May 13, 2026

=== Milestones ===
Regular season
Player	Milestone	Date
Matthew Schaefer	1st NHL Game	October 9, 2025
Matthew Schaefer	1st NHL Assist/Point	October 9, 2025
Maxim Shabanov	1st NHL Game	October 9, 2025
Maxim Shabanov	1st NHL Goal/Point	October 9, 2025
Matthew Schaefer	1st NHL Goal	October 11, 2025
Casey Cizikas	900th NHL Game	October 13, 2026
Jean-Gabriel Pageau	800th NHL Game	October 13, 2026
Maxim Shabanov	1st NHL Assist	October 18, 2025
Scott Mayfield	100th NHL Assist	October 23, 2025
Marshall Warren	1st NHL Game	October 25, 2025
Marshall Warren	1st NHL Assist/Point	October 25, 2025
Bo Horvat	300th NHL Assist	November 10, 2025
Calum Ritchie	1st NHL Assist	November 20, 2025
Adam Boqvist	100th NHL Point	November 20, 2025
Travis Mitchell	1st NHL Game	November 28, 2025
Travis Mitchell	1st NHL Goal/Point	December 11, 2025
Emil Heineman	100th NHL Game	December 16, 2025
Ryan Pulock	600th NHL Game	December 30, 2025
Adam Pelech	600th NHL Game	December 30, 2025
Maxim Tsyplakov	100th NHL Game	January 3, 2026
Simon Holmstrom	100th NHL Point	January 10, 2026
Mathew Barzal	500th NHL Point	January 15, 2026
Anders Lee	300th NHL Goal	January 17, 2026
Bo Horvat	600th NHL Point	February 5, 2026
Anders Lee	900th NHL Game	February 26, 2026
Tony DeAngelo	200th NHL Assist	March 1, 2026
Scott Mayfield	600th NHL Game	March 14, 2026
Mathew Barzal	600th NHL Game	March 22, 2026
Ilya Sorokin	300th NHL Game	March 27, 2026
Ondrej Palat	900th NHL Game	March 31, 2026
Jean-Gabriel Pageau	400th NHL Point	April 4, 2026
Brayden Schenn	1100th NHL Game	April 11, 2026
Bo Horvat	300th NHL Goal	April 14, 2026
Victor Eklund	1st NHL Game	April 14, 2026
Victor Eklund	1st NHL Assist/Point	April 14, 2026

=== Records ===
Regular season
Player	Milestone	Date
Ilya Sorokin	Most Shutouts in New York Islanders History	January 6, 2026

== Transactions ==
The Islanders have been involved in the following transactions during the 2025–26 season.

Key:

† Contract is entry-level.
‡ Contract initially takes effect in the 2026–27 season.

=== Trade ===
Date	Details		Ref
June 27, 2025	To Montreal Canadiens Noah Dobson	To New York Islanders Emil Heineman; 1st-round pick in 2025; CGY 1st-round pick in 2025	
January 26, 2025	To New York Islanders Carson Soucy	To New York Rangers 3rd-round pick in 2026	
January 27, 2026	To New Jersey Devils Maxim Tsyplakov	To New York Islanders Ondrej Palat; 3rd-round pick in 2026; 6th-round pick in 2027	
February 24, 2026	To New York Islanders Matt Luff	To St. Louis Blues Julien Gauthier	
March 6, 2026	To New York Islanders Brayden Schenn	To St. Louis Blues Jonathan Drouin; Marcus Gidlof; COL 1st-round pick in 2026; NJD 3rd-round pick in 2026	
June 27, 2026	To New York Islanders Ryan Healey	To Minnesota Wild Future Considerations	

=== Free agents ===
Date	Player	Team	Contract term	Ref
July 1, 2025	Ethan Bear	from Washington Capitals	1-year	
July 1, 2025	Jonathan Drouin	from Colorado Avalanche	2-year	
July 1, 2025	Matthew Highmore	from Ottawa Senators	1-year	
July 1, 2025	Cole McWard	from Vancouver Canucks	1-year	
July 1, 2025	David Rittich	from Los Angeles Kings	1-year	
July 1, 2025	Scott Perunovich	to Utah Mammoth	1-year	
July 1, 2025	Mike Reilly	to Carolina Hurricanes	1-year	
July 2, 2025	Maxim Shabanov	from Traktor Chelyabinsk (KHL)	1-year†	
July 2, 2025	Samuel Bolduc	to Los Angeles Kings	1-year	
July 10, 2025	Jakub Skarek	to San Jose Sharks	1-year	
August 18, 2025	Hudson Fasching	to Columbus Blue Jackets	1-year	
April 29, 2026	Marcus Högberg	to Linköping HC	3-year	

=== Waivers ===
Date	Player	Team	Ref

=== Contract terminations ===
Date	Player	Via	Ref

=== Retirement ===
Date	Player	Ref

=== Signings ===
Date	Player	Contract term	Ref
June 29, 2025	Julien Gauthier	1-year	
June 29, 2025	Liam Foudy	1-year	
June 30, 2025	Alexander Romanov	8-year	
July 1, 2025	Simon Holmstrom	2-year	
July 1, 2025	Tony DeAngelo	1-year	
July 2, 2025	Emil Heineman	2-year	
July 6, 2025	Marc Gatcomb	1-year	
July 14, 2025	Victor Eklund	3-year†	
July 25, 2025	Maxim Tsyplakov	2-year	
August 4, 2025	Matthew Schaefer	3-year†	
September 2, 2025	Daniil Prokhorov	3-year†	
March 6, 2026	Jean-Gabriel Pageau	3-year‡	
March 17, 2026	Kashawn Aitcheson	3-year†‡	
March 18, 2026	Cole Eiserman	3-year†‡	
March 24, 2026	Josh Kotai	2-year†‡	
April 15, 2026	Quinn Finley	2-year†‡	
May 26, 2026	Liam Foudy	1-year‡	
June 5, 2026	Marshall Warren	1-year‡	
June 11, 2026	Daylan Kuefler	2-year‡	
June 15, 2026	Ethan Bear	1-year‡	
June 26, 2026	Tony DeAngelo	2-year‡	

==== Key ====
† Contract is entry-level.

‡ Contract takes effect in the 2026–27 season.

== Draft picks ==
Below are the New York Islanders' selections at the 2025 NHL entry draft, which was held on June 27 and 28, 2025, at the Peacock Theater in Los Angeles, California.

Round	#	Player	Pos	Nationality	College/junior/club team
1	1	Matthew Schaefer	D	Canada	Erie Otters (OHL)
1	16	Victor Eklund	RW	Sweden	Djurgårdens IF (HockeyAllsvenskan)
1	17	Kashawn Aitcheson	D	Canada	Barrie Colts (OHL)
2	42	Daniil Prokhorov	RW	Russia	HC Dinamo Saint Petersburg (MHL)
3	74	Luca Romano	C	Canada	Kitchener Rangers (OHL)
4	104	Tomas Poletin	LW	Czech Republic	Lahti Pelicans (Liiga)
5	138	Sam Laurila	D	United States	Fargo Force (USHL)
6	170	Burke Hood	G	Canada	Vancouver Giants (WHL)
7	202	Jacob Kvasnicka	RW	United States	U.S. NTDP (USHL)
