= Jesper Wallstedt =

Swedish ice hockey player (born 2002)

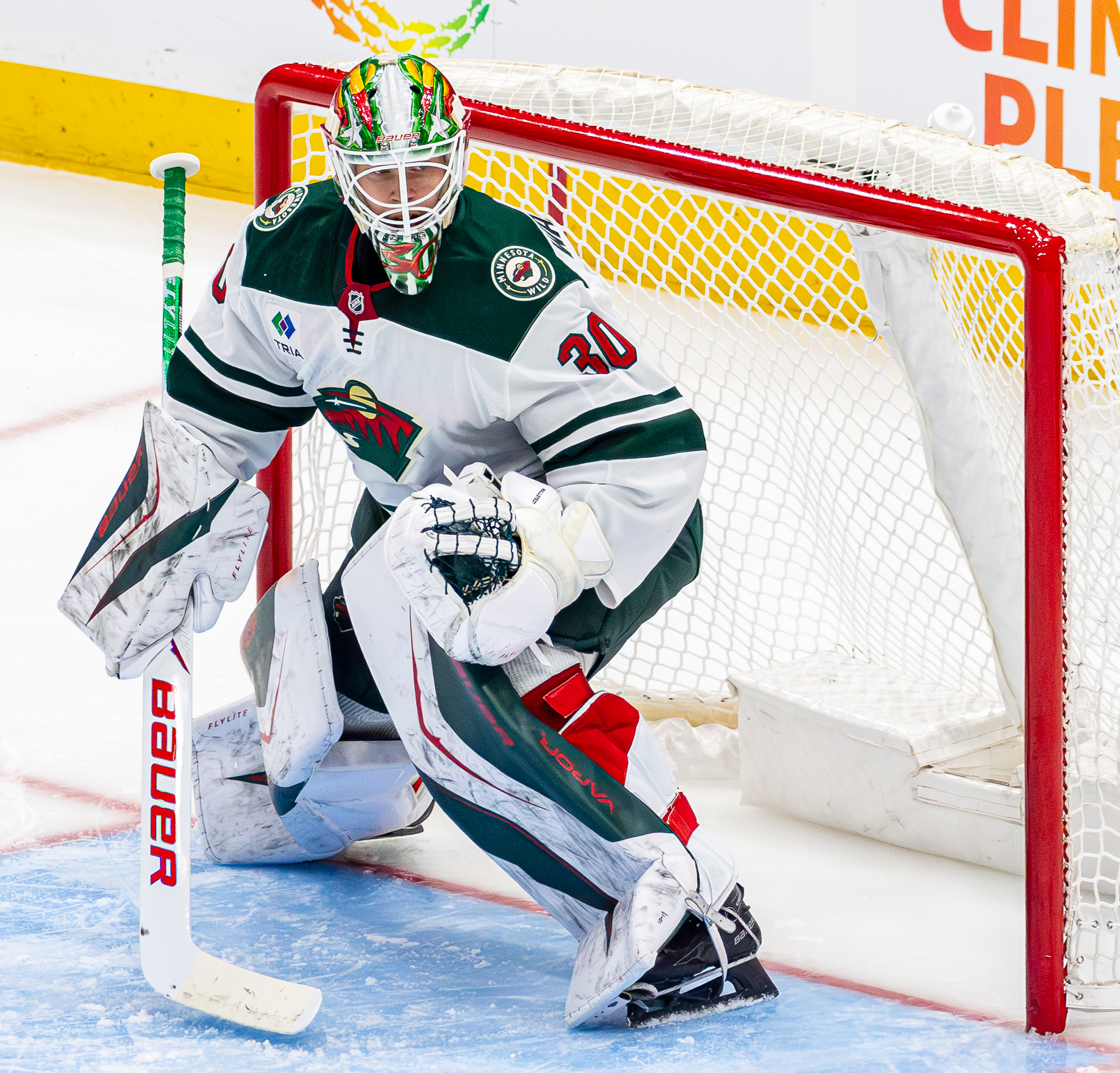
- Wallstedt in 2026
- Born: 14 November 2002 (age 23) Västerås, Sweden
- Height: 6 ft 3 in (191 cm)
- Weight: 214 lb (97 kg; 15 st 4 lb)
- Position: Goaltender
- Catches: Left
- NHL team Former teams: Minnesota Wild; Luleå HF
- National team: Sweden
- NHL draft: 20th overall, 2021; Minnesota Wild
- Playing career: 2020–present

Jesper Wallstedt (born 14 November 2002) is a Swedish professional ice hockey player who is a goaltender for the Minnesota Wild of the National Hockey League (NHL). Wallstedt was drafted by the Wild in the first round, 20th overall, in the 2021 NHL entry draft. Following a historic streak of shutouts as a rookie, he was nicknamed "the Wall of St. Paul" by the media.

== Playing career ==
Wallstedt played junior ice hockey with his hometown club, Västerås IK, before joining Luleå HF organization for the 2018–19 season. Wallstedt made his Swedish Hockey League (SHL) debut during the 2019–20 SHL season, playing in a game against HV71. He entered in the second period of the game in relief of David Rautio, and allowed one goal as Luleå HF lost 2–1 to HV71.

On 17 May 2022, Wallstedt was signed by the Minnesota Wild to a three-year, entry-level contract.

On 12 November 2022, Wallstedt recorded his first North American win, along with scoring an empty net goal, to secure a 5–2 Iowa Wild win over the Chicago Wolves.

During the 2023–24 season, on 10 January 2024, Wallstedt made his NHL debut in a 7–2 loss to the Dallas Stars, also becoming the youngest goaltender in the Wild's history. Later that season, on 7 April, Wallstedt made his second NHL start and earned his first NHL shutout in a 4–0 win over the Chicago Blackhawks.

On 2 December 2025, Wallstedt was named NHL's best rookie for November after he won all six games, also recording a league-best 1.14 goals against average (GAA), .967 save percentage (SV%) and three shutouts during the month.

Following the finish to the 2025–26 season Wallstedt finished sixth in Calder Memorial Trophy voting.

== Career statistics ==
=== Regular season and playoffs ===
			Regular season									Playoffs
Season	Team	League	GP	W	L	T	MIN	GA	SO	GAA	SV%	GP	W	L	MIN	GA	SO	GAA	SV%
2017–18	Västerås IK	J20	25	15	8	0	1,418	54	1	2.28	.921	3	1	2	183	8	0	2.62	.922
2018–19	Luleå HF	J20	21	12	8	0	1,222	54	1	2.65	.901	3	1	2	180	13	0	4.33	.870
2019–20	Luleå HF	J20	28	16	11	0	1,590	67	2	2.53	.923	—	—	—	—	—	—	—	—
2019–20	Luleå HF	SHL	1	0	1	0	38	1	0	1.55	.944	—	—	—	—	—	—	—	—
2020–21	Luleå HF	SHL	22	11	8	3	1,317	49	2	2.23	.908	2	0	1	71	4	0	3.36	.871
2020–21	Luleå HF	J20	1	1	0	0	60	0	1	0.00	1.000	—	—	—	—	—	—	—	—
2021–22	Luleå HF	SHL	22	12	10	0	1,303	43	3	1.98	.918	1	0	0	19	0	0	0.00	1.000
2021–22	Luleå HF	J20	—	—	—	—	—	—	—	—	—	1	0	1	60	5	0	5.00	.800
2022–23	Iowa Wild	AHL	38	18	15	5	2,262	101	1	2.68	.908	2	0	2	126	7	0	3.35	.897
2023–24	Iowa Wild	AHL	45	22	19	4	2,671	120	2	2.70	.910	—	—	—	—	—	—	—	—
2023–24	Minnesota Wild	NHL	3	2	1	0	179	9	1	3.01	.897	—	—	—	—	—	—	—	—
2024–25	Iowa Wild	AHL	27	9	14	4	1,556	93	1	3.59	.879	—	—	—	—	—	—	—	—
2024–25	Minnesota Wild	NHL	2	0	2	0	117	8	0	4.09	.843	—	—	—	—	—	—	—	—
2025–26	Minnesota Wild	NHL	35	18	9	6	1,997	87	4	2.61	.916	10	5	5	651	30	0	2.77	.909
SHL totals			45	24	19	3	2,658	93	5	2.10	.913	3	0	1	90	4	0	2.65	.892
NHL totals			40	20	12	6	2,293	104	5	2.72	.911	10	5	5	651	30	0	2.77	.909

=== International ===
Medal record

Men's ice hockey

Representing Sweden

World Championships
Bronze medal – third place	2024 Czechia	

World Junior Championships
Bronze medal – third place	2022 Canada	

World U18 Championships
Gold medal – first place	2019 Sweden	

Year	Team	Event	Result	GP	W	L	T	MIN	GA	SO	GAA	SV%
2018	Sweden	IH18	2nd place, silver medalist(s)	2	1	1	0	118	6	0	3.05	.893
2018	Sweden	U17	3rd place, bronze medalist(s)	5	3	2	0	311	15	0	2.90	.919
2019	Sweden	U18	1st place, gold medalist(s)	2	2	0	0	120	3	0	1.50	.936
2019	Sweden	IH18	3rd place, bronze medalist(s)	3	1	2	0	194	8	0	2.47	.936
2021	Sweden	WJC	5th	2	0	1	0	99	4	0	2.40	.923
2022	Sweden	WJC	3rd place, bronze medalist(s)	5	3	2	0	297	8	0	1.62	.940
2023	Sweden	WC	6th	3	3	0	0	180	2	1	0.67	.947
Junior totals				19	10	8	0	1,139	44	0	2.32	—
Senior totals				3	3	0	0	180	2	1	0.67	.947

Awards and achievements
Preceded by Marco Rossi	Minnesota Wild first-round draft pick 2021	Succeeded by Carson Lambos
