= Isaak Phillips =

Canadian ice hockey player (born 2001)

- Born: September 28, 2001 (age 24) Barrie, Ontario, Canada
- Height: 6 ft 3 in (191 cm)
- Weight: 205 lb (93 kg; 14 st 9 lb)
- Position: Defence
- Shoots: Left
- NHL team (P) Cur. team Former teams: Winnipeg Jets; Manitoba Moose (AHL); Chicago Blackhawks
- NHL draft: 141st overall, 2020; Chicago Blackhawks
- Playing career: 2021–present

Isaak Phillips (born September 28, 2001) is a Canadian professional ice hockey defenceman currently playing for the Manitoba Moose in the American Hockey League (AHL) as a prospect under contract with the Winnipeg Jets of the National Hockey League (NHL).

== Personal life ==
Phillips was born in Barrie and has a diverse heritage, with Afro-Vincentian roots through his paternal grandparents, who came from St. Vincent, and Finnish ancestry from his mother.

== Playing career ==
Phillips played major junior hockey with the Sudbury Wolves in the Ontario Hockey League (OHL). He was selected by the Chicago Blackhawks in the fifth round, 141st overall, of the 2020 NHL entry draft. The Blackhawks signed him to a three-year entry-level deal on March 31, 2021.

Phillips played his first NHL game on October 29, 2021, in a 6–3 loss to the Carolina Hurricanes, where he did not register a point. He went on to appear in four games for the Chicago Blackhawks during the 2021–22 season, spending most of his time with their American Hockey League (AHL) affiliate, the Rockford IceHogs. On January 14, 2023, he netted his first NHL goal in an 8–5 defeat against the Seattle Kraken.

On January 15, 2025, Phillips was traded to the Winnipeg Jets in a transaction that saw defenceman Dmitry Kuzmin sent to the Chicago Blackhawks in return.

On July 11, 2025, Phillips re-signed with Winnipeg for a two-year, two-way contract.

== International play ==
Phillips played for Team Jamaica at the 2018 Team Elite Hockey Prospect Showcase, helping the team win the tournament. While he doesn't have Jamaican heritage himself, the roster featured players from various West Indian backgrounds.

== Career statistics ==
			Regular season					Playoffs
Season	Team	League	GP	G	A	Pts	PIM	GP	G	A	Pts	PIM
2017–18	Stouffville Spirit	OJHL	52	3	8	11	40	—	—	—	—	—
2018–19	Sudbury Wolves	OHL	68	3	11	14	54	8	0	1	1	6
2019–20	Sudbury Wolves	OHL	63	9	17	26	27	—	—	—	—	—
2020–21	Rockford IceHogs	AHL	27	2	7	9	14	—	—	—	—	—
2021–22	Rockford IceHogs	AHL	64	10	15	25	46	5	0	2	2	4
2021–22	Chicago Blackhawks	NHL	4	0	0	0	4	—	—	—	—	—
2022–23	Rockford IceHogs	AHL	51	6	17	23	80	5	1	2	3	2
2022–23	Chicago Blackhawks	NHL	16	1	4	5	5	—	—	—	—	—
2023–24	Rockford IceHogs	AHL	29	4	10	14	20	4	0	2	2	4
2023–24	Chicago Blackhawks	NHL	33	0	6	6	22	—	—	—	—	—
2024–25	Rockford IceHogs	AHL	28	1	7	8	54	—	—	—	—	—
2024–25	Chicago Blackhawks	NHL	3	1	0	1	0	—	—	—	—	—
2024–25	Manitoba Moose	AHL	39	3	5	8	20	—	—	—	—	—
2025–26	Manitoba Moose	AHL	67	10	19	29	45	7	0	0	0	2
2025–26	Winnipeg Jets	NHL	3	0	0	0	2	—	—	—	—	—
NHL totals			59	2	10	12	33	—	—	—	—	—
