= Daemon Hunt =

Canadian ice hockey player (born 2002)

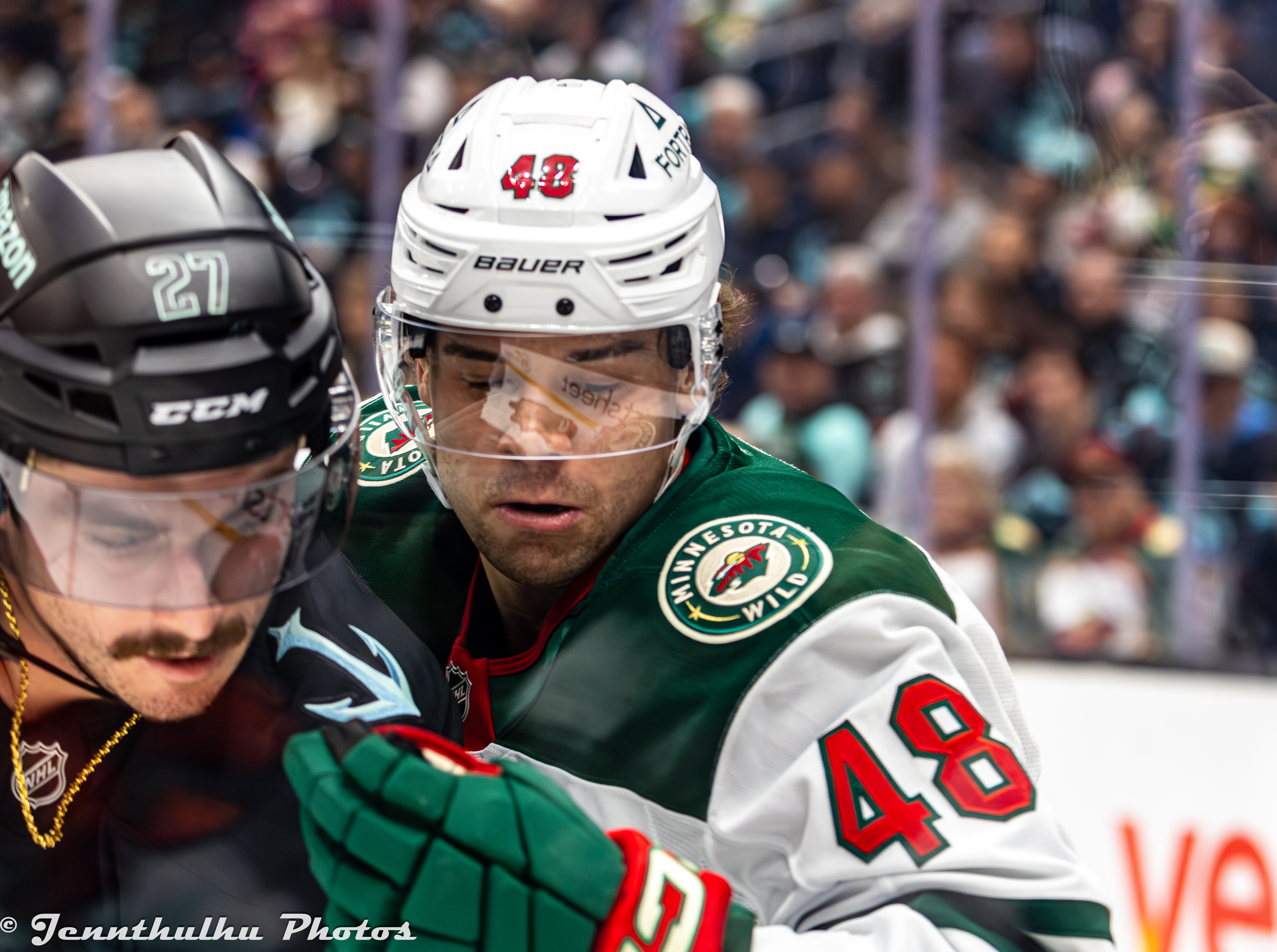
- Hunt with the Minnesota Wild in 2025
- Born: May 15, 2002 (age 24) Brandon, Manitoba, Canada
- Height: 6 ft 1 in (185 cm)
- Weight: 193 lb (88 kg; 13 st 11 lb)
- Position: Defence
- Shoots: Left
- NHL team Former teams: Nashville Predators; Minnesota Wild
- NHL draft: 65th overall, 2020; Minnesota Wild
- Playing career: 2021–present

Daemon Hunt (born May 15, 2002) is a Canadian professional ice hockey player who is a defenceman for the Nashville Predators of the National Hockey League (NHL).

== Playing career ==
As a youth in 2011–12, Hunt played six games and scored two points for the Saskatchewan Junior Pats in the Brick Invitational tournament. He was a member of the under-15 team of the Brandon Wheat Kings in 2015–16 and 2016–17 before joining their under-18 squad for the 2017–18 season. He scored 60 points in the 2016–17 season and was selected in the first round with the 15th overall pick of the 2017 WHL bantam draft by the Moose Jaw Warriors. He had 36 assists and four goals in 40 games with the Wheat Kings in 2017–18 and also played nine games that season with Moose Jaw, scoring a goal and having an assist. In the 2018–19 season with the Warriors, Hunt appeared in 57 games and scored 20 points on seven goals and 13 assists. He became an alternate captain for the team in 2019–20 and scored 15 points in 28 games.

Hunt was selected in the third round of the 2020 NHL entry draft with the 65th overall pick by the Minnesota Wild. Before the 2020–21 season, he played briefly on loan for the Virden Oil Capitals of the Manitoba Junior Hockey League (MJHL) and then had a three-game stay with the Iowa Wild of the American Hockey League (AHL), after which he returned to the Warriors and served as their team captain, scoring 18 points in 23 games. He played three further games for the Iowa Wild after the WHL season finished.

On May 6, 2021, Hunt signed a three-year, entry-level contract with the Minnesota Wild. He remained with Moose Jaw as team captain in the 2021–22 season, playing 46 games and scoring 39 points. He finished his WHL career with 163 games played and 94 points scored (33 goals, 61 assists). He played with the AHL Iowa Wild in the 2022–23 season and appeared in 59 games while totaling 11 points (two goals, nine assists). He had two game-winning goals, placing first among the league's rookie defencemen.

Hunt was injured in a Minnesota Wild preseason game in 2023–24 and was then sent back to Iowa. After four games with Iowa, he was called up to Minnesota on October 23, 2023, and made his NHL debut in a 3–2 loss to the Washington Capitals. He played two games for Minnesota, posting one shot on goal, before being reassigned to Iowa on October 30.

During the 2024–25 season, Hunt was traded by the Wild alongside four draft picks to the Columbus Blue Jackets in exchange for David Jiříček on November 30, 2024. Hunt had spent the rest of the season at the AHL affiliate Cleveland Monsters where he posted 2 goals and 12 assists for 14 points in 48 games.

On October 2, 2025, Hunt was placed on waivers by the Blue Jackets, and was claimed by his original team, the Minnesota Wild, the following day. In the 2025–26 season, Hunt established career highs with 6 assists in 34 games played, as the depth defenceman on the blueline. He was re-signed by the Wild to a one-year, $900,000 contract extension on July 6, 2026.

In the 2026–27 season, Hunt opened the season with the Wild, going scoreless through 11 appearances, before he was placed on waivers and subsequently claimed by the Nashville Predators on October 24, 2026.

== International play ==
Hunt played for the Canada team at the 2018 World U-17 Hockey Challenge. He played at the 2019 IIHF World U18 Championships, recording one assist in seven games while having a plus–minus rating of plus-five. Hunt was also selected to the 2019 Hlinka Gretzky Cup and played five games, helping Canada win the silver medal. He was in the World Junior selection camp in 2020 but did not make the final cut after contracting COVID-19. Hunt was selected to the 2022 World Junior roster again for team Canada, but was injured in a pre tournament game prior to the tournament beginning. Canada won the gold medal at the 2022 World Junior Ice Hockey Championships.

== Personal life ==
Hunt was born on May 15, 2002, in Brandon, Manitoba. He grew up in Moosomin, Saskatchewan. but eventually moved back to Brandon, Manitoba to play hockey. He is a cousin with former NHL player Matt Calvert.

== Career statistics ==
=== Regular season and playoffs ===
| | | | Regular season | | | | | Playoffs |
| Season | Team | League | GP | G | A | Pts | PIM | GP | G | A | Pts | PIM |
|---|---|---|---|---|---|---|---|---|---|---|---|---|
| 2017–18 | Brandon Wheat Kings U18 | MMHL | 40 | 4 | 36 | 40 | 32 | 9 | 0 | 1 | 1 | 2 |
| 2017–18 | Moose Jaw Warriors | WHL | 9 | 1 | 1 | 2 | 2 | 2 | 0 | 0 | 0 | 0 |
| 2018–19 | Moose Jaw Warriors | WHL | 57 | 7 | 13 | 20 | 10 | 4 | 0 | 0 | 0 | 0 |
| 2019–20 | Moose Jaw Warriors | WHL | 28 | 0 | 15 | 15 | 17 | — | — | — | — | — |
| 2020–21 | Virden Oil Capitals | MJHL | 3 | 3 | 2 | 5 | 2 | — | — | — | — | — |
| 2020–21 | Iowa Wild | AHL | 6 | 1 | 0 | 1 | 0 | — | — | — | — | — |
| 2020–21 | Moose Jaw Warriors | WHL | 23 | 8 | 10 | 18 | 11 | — | — | — | — | — |
| 2021–22 | Moose Jaw Warriors | WHL | 46 | 17 | 22 | 39 | 41 | 1 | 0 | 0 | 0 | 0 |
| 2022–23 | Iowa Wild | AHL | 59 | 2 | 9 | 11 | 14 | 2 | 0 | 1 | 1 | 0 |
| 2023–24 | Iowa Wild | AHL | 51 | 3 | 26 | 29 | 29 | — | — | — | — | — |
| 2023–24 | Minnesota Wild | NHL | 12 | 0 | 1 | 1 | 0 | — | — | — | — | — |
| 2024–25 | Iowa Wild | AHL | 9 | 0 | 4 | 4 | 5 | — | — | — | — | — |
| 2024–25 | Minnesota Wild | NHL | 1 | 0 | 0 | 0 | 0 | — | — | — | — | — |
| 2024–25 | Cleveland Monsters | AHL | 48 | 2 | 12 | 14 | 16 | — | — | — | — | — |
| 2025–26 | Minnesota Wild | NHL | 32 | 0 | 6 | 6 | 6 | 5 | 0 | 1 | 1 | 0 |
| 2026–27 | Minnesota Wild | NHL | 11 | 0 | 0 | 0 | 4 | — | — | — | — | — |
| NHL totals | | | 56 | 0 | 7 | 7 | 10 | 5 | 0 | 1 | 1 | 0 |

=== International ===
| Year | Team | Event | Result | GP | G | A | Pts | PIM |
|---|---|---|---|---|---|---|---|---|
| 2018 | Canada Black | U17 | 5th | 5 | 0 | 2 | 2 | 0 |
| 2019 | Canada | U18 | 4th | 7 | 0 | 1 | 1 | 0 |
| 2019 | Canada | HG18 | 2nd place, silver medalist(s) | 5 | 0 | 0 | 0 | 0 |
| Junior totals | | | | 17 | 0 | 3 | 3 | 0 |
