= 2025–26 Florida Panthers season =

National Hockey League season

2025–26 Florida Panthers
- Division: 7th Atlantic
- Conference: 14th Eastern
- 2025–26 record: 40–38–4
- Home record: 23–15–3
- Road record: 17–23–1
- Goals for: 251
- Goals against: 276

Team information
- General manager: Bill Zito
- Coach: Paul Maurice
- Captain: Aleksander Barkov
- Alternate captains: Aaron Ekblad; Matthew Tkachuk
- Arena: Amerant Bank Arena
- Minor league affiliates: Charlotte Checkers (AHL); Savannah Ghost Pirates (ECHL)

Team leaders
- Goals: Sam Reinhart (29)
- Assists: Sam Reinhart (32)
- Points: Sam Reinhart (61)
- Penalty minutes: A. J. Greer (113)
- Plus/minus: A. J. Greer (+6)
- Wins: Sergei Bobrovsky (26)
- Goals against average: Sergei Bobrovsky (3.00)

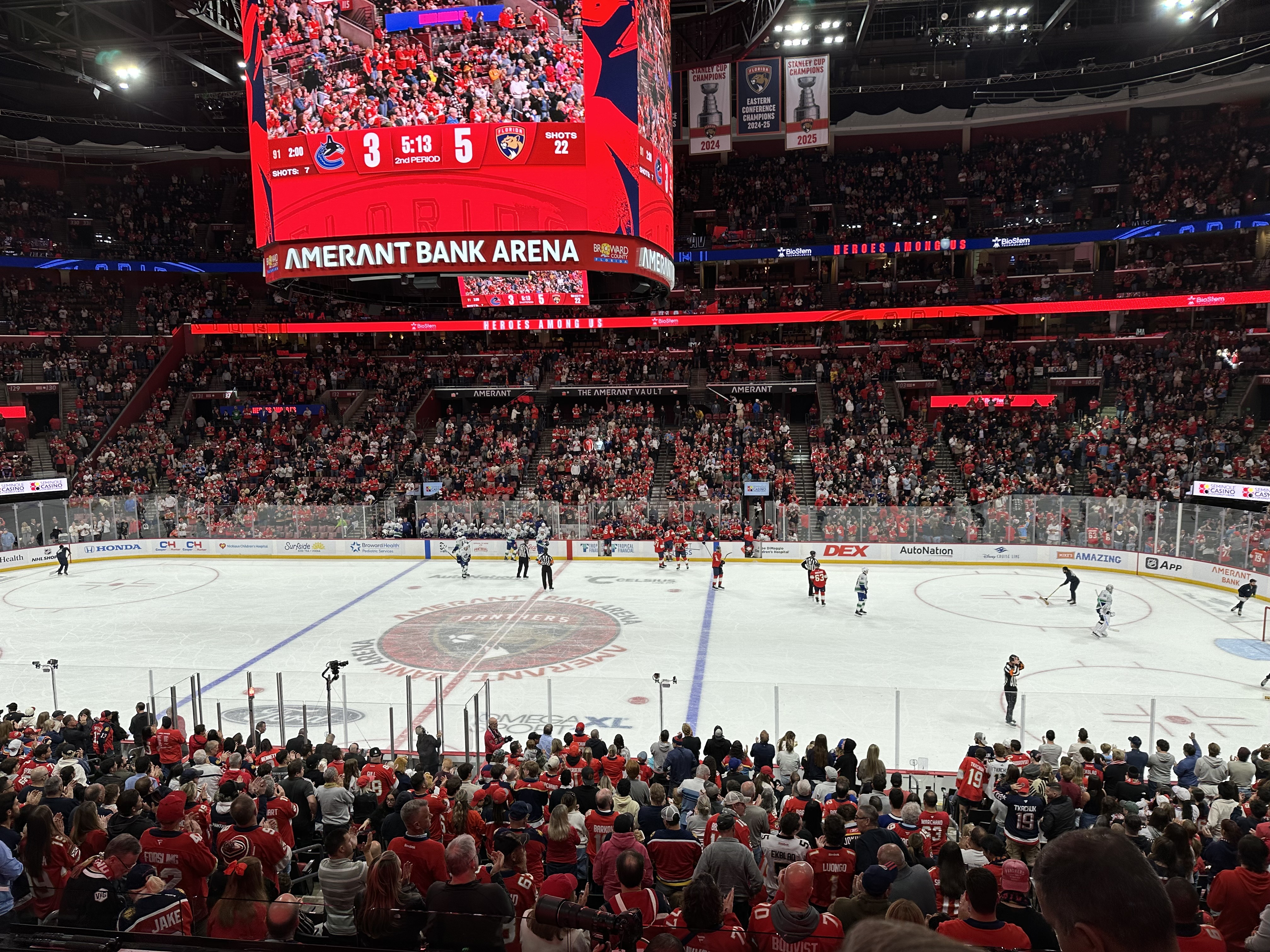
Amerant Bank Arena during a game in November 2025 between the Panthers and the Vancouver Canucks.

The 2025–26 Florida Panthers season was the 32nd season for the National Hockey League (NHL) franchise that was established in 1993. The Panthers entered the season as the three-time defending Eastern Conference champions and two-time defending Stanley Cup champions, having defeated the Edmonton Oilers in six games in the 2025 Stanley Cup Final.

The Panthers were the subject of criticism after a violent preseason brawl with the Tampa Bay Lightning that resulted in heavy fines and suspensions for Tampa Bay but only a minimal fine for Panthers player A. J. Greer, a disparity that commentators said raised questions about the NHL's disciplinary consistency. The Guardian reported that the episode revived concerns that the league's disciplinary system may favour certain clubs because of personal and institutional connections within NHL administration. The article also highlighted scrutiny of team owner Vincent Viola and minority owner Douglas Cifu over political associations, and a politically-charged social media exchange by Cifu that later resulted in his suspension by the NHL.

The Panthers struggled throughout the season with injuries to key players, including captain Aleksander Barkov missing the entire season after suffering a knee injury in the preseason, and were eliminated from playoff contention on April 4, for the first time since the 2018–19 season, following a loss to the Pittsburgh Penguins, becoming the first defending champion to miss the playoffs since the 2014–15 Los Angeles Kings, and also became the first two-time defending champion to miss the playoffs since the 1969–70 Montreal Canadiens. Coincidentally; the Panthers happened to miss the playoffs outright after three straight trips to the Stanley Cup Final similar to how the Kansas City Chiefs of the NFL missed the playoffs after three straight Super Bowl appearances themselves, marking a rare occurrence of such a circumstance across the sports leagues.

== Standings ==
=== Divisional standings ===
Atlantic Division
Pos	Team	GP	W	L	OTL	RW	GF	GA	GD	Pts
1	y – Buffalo Sabres	82	50	23	9	42	288	241	+47	109
2	x – Tampa Bay Lightning	82	50	26	6	40	290	231	+59	106
3	x – Montreal Canadiens	82	48	24	10	34	283	256	+27	106
4	x – Boston Bruins	82	45	27	10	33	272	250	+22	100
5	x – Ottawa Senators	82	44	27	11	38	278	246	+32	99
6	Detroit Red Wings	82	41	31	10	30	241	258	−17	92
7	Florida Panthers	82	40	38	4	32	251	276	−25	84
8	Toronto Maple Leafs	82	32	36	14	23	253	299	−46	78

Source: National Hockey League
Rules for classification: 1) Fewer number of games played (GP, only during regular season); 2) Greater number of regulation wins (RW); 3) Greater number of wins in regulation and overtime, excluding shootout wins (ROW); 4) Greater number of total wins, including shootouts (W); 5) Greater number of points earned in head-to-head play; if teams played an uneven number of head-to-head games, the result of the first game on the home ice of the team with the extra home game is discarded; 6) Greater goal differential (GD); 7) Greater number of goals scored (GF)
x – Clinched playoff spot; y – Clinched division

=== Conference standings ===
Eastern Conference Wild Card
Pos	Div	Team	GP	W	L	OTL	RW	GF	GA	GD	Pts
1	AT	x – Boston Bruins	82	45	27	10	33	272	250	+22	100
2	AT	x – Ottawa Senators	82	44	27	11	38	278	246	+32	99
3	ME	Washington Capitals	82	43	30	9	37	263	244	+19	95
4	AT	Detroit Red Wings	82	41	31	10	30	241	258	−17	92
5	ME	Columbus Blue Jackets	82	40	30	12	28	253	253	0	92
6	ME	New York Islanders	82	43	34	5	29	233	241	−8	91
7	ME	New Jersey Devils	82	42	37	3	29	230	254	−24	87
8	AT	Florida Panthers	82	40	38	4	32	251	276	−25	84
9	AT	Toronto Maple Leafs	82	32	36	14	23	253	299	−46	78
10	ME	New York Rangers	82	34	39	9	25	238	250	−12	77

Source: National Hockey League
Rules for classification: 1) Fewer number of games played (GP, only during regular season); 2) Greater number of regulation wins (RW); 3) Greater number of wins in regulation and overtime, excluding shootout wins (ROW); 4) Greater number of total wins, including shootouts (W); 5) Greater number of points earned in head-to-head play; if teams played an uneven number of head-to-head games, the result of the first game on the home ice of the team with the extra home game is discarded; 6) Greater goal differential (GD); 7) Greater number of goals scored (GF)
x – Clinched playoff spot

== Schedule and results ==
=== Preseason ===
The preseason schedule was published on June 24, 2025.

2025 preseason game log: 3–4–0 (Home: 2–0–0; Road: 1–4–0)
#	Date	Visitor	Score	Home	OT	Decision	Attendance	Record	Recap
1^{A}	September 21	Florida	0–5	Nashville		Bussi	5,496	0–1–0
2^{A}	September 21	Florida	3–5	Nashville		Black	17,059	0–2–0
3	September 24	Florida	4–2	Carolina		Tarasov	18,299	1–2–0
4	September 29	Carolina	3–4	Florida	OT	Bobrovsky	15,895	2–2–0
5^{B}	September 30	Florida	2–3	Tampa Bay		Bussi	15,334	2–3–0
6	October 2	Florida	2–5	Tampa Bay		Tarasov	13,200	2–4–0
7	October 4	Tampa Bay	0–7	Florida		Bobrovsky	17,862	3–4–0
Notes:^{A} Indicates split-squad. ^{B} Played at Kia Center in Orlando, Florida.

=== Regular season ===
The regular season schedule was published on July 16, 2025.

2025–26 game log

October: 5–5–1 (Home: 4–1–1; Road: 1–4–0)
#	Date	Visitor	Score	Home	OT	Decision	Attendance	Record	Pts	Recap
1	October 7	Chicago	2–3	Florida		Bobrovsky	19,655	1–0–0	2
2	October 9	Philadelphia	1–2	Florida		Bobrovsky	19,431	2–0–0	4
3	October 11	Ottawa	2–6	Florida		Bobrovsky	19,704	3–0–0	6
4	October 13	Florida	2–5	Philadelphia		Tarasov	19,421	3–1–0	6
5	October 15	Florida	1–4	Detroit		Bobrovsky	18,655	3–2–0	6
6	October 16	Florida	1–3	New Jersey		Tarasov	16,514	3–3–0	6
7	October 18	Florida	0–3	Buffalo		Bobrovsky	16,015	3–4–0	6
8	October 21	Florida	4–3	Boston		Bobrovsky	17,850	4–4–0	8
9	October 23	Pittsburgh	5–3	Florida		Bobrovsky	19,373	4–5–0	8
10	October 25	Vegas	0–3	Florida		Bobrovsky	19,558	5–5–0	10
11	October 28	Anaheim	3–2	Florida	SO	Tarasov	19,274	5–5–1	11

November: 7–6–0 (Home: 4–4–0; Road: 3–2–0)
#	Date	Visitor	Score	Home	OT	Decision	Attendance	Record	Pts	Recap
12	November 1	Dallas	3–4	Florida	SO	Bobrovsky	19,386	6–5–1	13
13	November 4	Florida	3–7	Anaheim		Bobrovsky	14,514	6–6–1	13
14	November 6	Florida	5–2	Los Angeles		Bobrovsky	16,909	7–6–1	15
15	November 8	Florida	1–3	San Jose		Tarasov	15,895	7–7–1	15
16	November 10	Florida	3–2	Vegas		Bobrovsky	17,812	8–7–1	17
17	November 13	Washington	3–6	Florida		Tarasov	19,650	9–7–1	19
18	November 15	Tampa Bay	3–1	Florida		Bobrovsky	19,894	9–8–1	19
19	November 17	Vancouver	5–8	Florida		Bobrovsky	19,260	10–8–1	21
20	November 20	New Jersey	0–1	Florida		Bobrovsky	19,473	11–8–1	23
21	November 22	Edmonton	6–3	Florida		Bobrovsky	19,534	11–9–1	23
22	November 24	Florida	8–3	Nashville		Tarasov	17,431	12–9–1	25
23	November 26	Philadelphia	4–2	Florida		Bobrovsky	19,729	12–10–1	25
24	November 28	Calgary	5–3	Florida		Tarasov	19,664	12–11–1	25

December: 9–4–2 (Home: 5–3–2; Road: 4–1–0)
#	Date	Visitor	Score	Home	OT	Decision	Attendance	Record	Pts	Recap
25	December 2	Toronto	4–1	Florida		Bobrovsky	19,268	12–12–1	25
26	December 4	Nashville	2–1	Florida	OT	Bobrovsky	19,340	12–12–2	26
27	December 6	Columbus	6–7	Florida	OT	Bobrovsky	19,269	13–12–2	28
28	December 7	NY Islanders	1–4	Florida		Tarasov	19,334	14–12–2	30
29	December 10	Florida	4–3	Utah		Bobrovsky	12,478	15–12–2	32
30	December 11	Florida	2–6	Colorado		Tarasov	18,112	15–13–2	32
31	December 13	Florida	4–0	Dallas		Bobrovsky	18,532	16–13–2	34
32	December 15	Florida	5–2	Tampa Bay		Bobrovsky	19,092	17–13–2	36
33	December 17	Los Angeles	2–3	Florida		Tarasov	19,612	18–13–2	38
34	December 19	Carolina	3–4	Florida	SO	Bobrovsky	19,217	19–13–2	40
35	December 20	St. Louis	6–2	Florida		Tarasov	19,081	19–14–2	40
36	December 23	Florida	5–2	Carolina		Bobrovsky	18,318	20–14–2	42
37	December 27	Tampa Bay	4–2	Florida		Bobrovsky	19,651	20–15–2	42
38	December 29	Washington	3–5	Florida		Bobrovsky	19,421	21–15–2	44
39	December 30	Montreal	3–2	Florida	OT	Tarasov	19,646	21–15–3	45

January: 7–8–0 (Home: 1–4–0; Road: 6–4–0)
#	Date	Visitor	Score	Home	OT	Decision	Attendance	Record	Pts	Recap
40	January 2	NY Rangers	5–1	Florida		Bobrovsky	36,153 (outdoors)	21–16–3	45
41	January 4	Colorado	1–2	Florida		Tarasov	19,654	22–16–3	47
42	January 6	Florida	1–4	Toronto		Bobrovsky	18,911	22–17–3	47
43	January 8	Florida	2–6	Montreal		Bobrovsky	20,962	22–18–3	47
44	January 10	Florida	3–2	Ottawa		Bobrovsky	17,085	23–18–3	49
45	January 12	Florida	4–3	Buffalo		Bobrovsky	16,343	24–18–3	51
46	January 16	Florida	1–9	Carolina		Bobrovsky	18,319	24–19–3	51
47	January 17	Florida	5–2	Washington		Tarasov	18,347	25–19–3	53
48	January 19	San Jose	4–1	Florida		Bobrovsky	19,191	25–20–3	53
49	January 22	Florida	2–1	Winnipeg	SO	Tarasov	14,106	26–20–3	54
50	January 24	Florida	4–3	Minnesota	OT	Bobrovsky	19,103	27–20–3	57
51	January 25	Florida	5–1	Chicago		Tarasov	19,313	28–20–3	59
52	January 27	Utah	4–3	Florida		Bobrovsky	20,073	28–21–3	59
53	January 29	Florida	4–5	St. Louis		Tarasov	18,096	28–22–3	59
54	January 31	Winnipeg	2–1	Florida		Bobrovsky	19,895	28–23–3	59

February: 2–3–0 (Home: 2–2–0; Road: 0–1–0)
#	Date	Visitor	Score	Home	OT	Decision	Attendance	Record	Pts	Recap
55	February 2	Buffalo	5–3	Florida		Bobrovsky	19,474	28–24–3	59
56	February 4	Boston	4–5	Florida	SO	Bobrovsky	18,843	29–24–3	61
57	February 5	Florida	1–6	Tampa Bay		Tarasov	19,092	29–25–3	61
58	February 26	Toronto	1–5	Florida		Bobrovsky	19,372	30–25–3	63
59	February 27	Buffalo	3–2	Florida		Tarasov	19,783	30–26–3	63

March: 6–9–0 (Home: 4–1–0; Road: 2–8–0)
#	Date	Visitor	Score	Home	OT	Decision	Attendance	Record	Pts	Recap
60	March 1	Florida	4–5	NY Islanders		Bobrovsky	17,255	30–27–3	63
61	March 3	Florida	1–5	New Jersey		Bobrovsky	15,080	30–28–3	63
62	March 5	Florida	2–4	Columbus		Tarasov	16,669	30–29–3	63
63	March 6	Florida	3–1	Detroit		Bobrovsky	19,515	31–29–3	65
64	March 10	Detroit	3–4	Florida		Tarasov	19,528	32–29–3	67
65	March 12	Columbus	1–2	Florida	OT	Bobrovsky	18,686	33–29–3	69
66	March 15	Florida	2–6	Seattle		Tarasov	17,151	33–30–3	69
67	March 17	Florida	2–5	Vancouver		Bobrovsky	18,355	33–31–3	69
68	March 19	Florida	4–0	Edmonton		Bobrovsky	18,347	34–31–3	71
69	March 20	Florida	1–4	Calgary		Tarasov	18,272	34–32–3	71
70	March 24	Seattle	4–5	Florida	SO	Bobrovsky	19,043	35–32–3	73
71	March 26	Minnesota	3–2	Florida		Tarasov	18,979	35–33–3	73
72	March 28	Florida	2–5	NY Islanders		Tarasov	17,225	35–34–3	73
73	March 29	Florida	1–3	NY Rangers		Bobrovsky	17,244	35–35–3	73
74	March 31	Ottawa	3–6	Florida		Tarasov	17,672	36–35–3	75

April: 4–3–1 (Home: 3–0–0; Road: 1–3–1)
#	Date	Visitor	Score	Home	OT	Decision	Attendance	Record	Pts	Recap
75	April 2	Boston	1–2	Florida		Bobrovsky	19,823	37–35–3	77
76	April 4	Florida	4–9	Pittsburgh		Bobrovsky	18,336	37–36–3	77
77	April 5	Florida	2–5	Pittsburgh		Tarasov	17,028	37–37–3	77
78	April 7	Florida	3–4	Montreal	SO	Tarasov	20,962	37–37–4	78
79	April 9	Florida	1–5	Ottawa		Bobrovsky	17,483	37–38–4	78
80	April 11	Florida	6–2	Toronto		Tarasov	18,327	38–38–4	80
81	April 13	NY Rangers	2–3	Florida		Tarasov	19,707	39–38–4	82
82	April 15	Detroit	1–8	Florida		Tarasov	19,403	40–38–4	84

Legend: Win (2 points) Loss (0 points) Overtime/shootout loss (1 point)

=== Milestones ===
Regular season
Player	Milestone	Reached
Paul Maurice	2,000 NHL Games Coached	March 24, 2026

== Player statistics ==
=== Skaters ===
Regular season
Player	GP	G	A	Pts	+/−	PIM
Sam Reinhart	64	29	32	61	−18	10
Sam Bennett	76	26	32	58	−10	82
Carter Verhaeghe	77	25	30	55	−14	32
Brad Marchand	52	27	27	54	−16	38
Anton Lundell	64	18	26	44	−8	34
Matthew Tkachuk	31	13	21	34	−6	48
Eetu Luostarinen	73	11	22	33	+4	32
A.J. Greer	78	17	15	32	+14	113
Mackie Samoskevich	77	12	20	32	−5	30
Seth Jones	52	7	25	32	−3	18
Evan Rodrigues	69	11	20	31	−16	38
Gustav Forsling	80	2	26	28	−5	51
Aaron Ekblad	72	4	22	26	−5	55
Uvis Balinskis	54	5	10	15	−13	30
Jesper Boqvist	73	4	9	13	−11	16
Niko Mikkola	68	3	8	11	−1	47
Luke Kunin	62	4	6	10	−6	47
Noah Gregor	37	4	5	9	−10	26
Cole Reinhardt^{†}	15	6	2	8	+4	2
Vinnie Hinostroza^{†}	17	3	5	8	−4	16
Jeff Petry^{‡}	58	0	8	8	−10	22
Donovan Sebrango^{†}	40	0	8	8	−4	63
Cole Schwindt	29	5	2	7	+2	2
Mike Benning	18	2	4	6	−4	2
Sandis Vilmanis	19	3	2	5	−1	4
Tomas Nosek	21	2	2	4	−8	4
Tobias Bjornfot	19	2	2	4	+1	2
Jonah Gadjovich	10	0	3	3	+2	7
Marek Alscher	4	0	3	3	+4	0
Wilmer Skoog	3	0	2	2	+3	4
Nolan Foote	12	1	0	1	−4	6
Ludvig Jansson	4	0	1	1	+2	0
Mikulas Hovorka	4	0	1	1	−1	0
Dmitry Kulikov	19	0	0	0	−5	10
Jack Studnicka	19	0	0	0	−6	4
Jack Devine	6	0	0	0	−3	2

=== Goaltenders ===
Regular season
Player	GP	GS	TOI	W	L	OT	GA	GAA	SA	SV%	SO	G	A	PIM
Sergei Bobrovsky	52	51	3009:39	27	23	1	154	3.07	1250	.877	4	0	2	9
Daniil Tarasov	33	31	1905:40	13	15	3	97	3.05	925	.895	0	0	0	0

- ^{†}Denotes player spent time with another team before joining the Panthers. Stats reflect time with the Panthers only.
- ^{‡}Denotes player was traded mid-season. Stats reflect time with the Panthers only.
- Bold/italics denotes franchise record.

== Transactions ==
The Panthers have been involved in the following transactions during the 2025–26 season.

Key:

† Contract is entry-level.
‡ Contract initially takes effect in the 2026–27 season.

=== Trades ===
Date	Details		Ref
June 28, 2025	To Chicago Blackhawks 7th-round pick in 2026	To Florida Panthers BOS 7th-round pick in 2025 (#197 overall)	
March 5, 2026	To Minnesota Wild Jeff Petry	To Florida Panthers conditional 5th-round pick in 2026 or 7th-round pick in 2026	
March 6, 2026	To Minnesota Wild Future considerations	To Florida Panthers Vinnie Hinostroza	
June 13, 2026	To Pittsburgh Penguins Oliver Okuliar	To Florida Panthers Emil Pieniniemi	
June 21, 2026	To Seattle Kraken Mackie Samoskevich	To Florida Panthers TBL 1st-round pick in 2026 conditional (Note: Florida will receive the better of Columbus' or Winnipeg's second-round pick in 2027.) CBJ 2nd-round pick in 2027 or WPG 2nd-round pick in 2027	
June 21, 2026	To Ottawa Senators 1st-round pick in 2026; TBL 1st-round pick in 2026; 2nd-round pick in 2027 conditional (Note: Ottawa will receive Florida's 1st-round pick in 2029 if it is outside of the top-10; otherwise, Ottawa will receive Florida's first-round pick in 2030.) 1st-round pick in 2029 or 1st-round pick in 2030	To Florida Panthers Brady Tkachuk	
June 25, 2026	To Philadelphia Flyers 5th-round pick in 2026; 4th-round pick in 2027	To Florida Panthers Garnet Hathaway* (Note: Philadelphia retained 50% of Hathaway's contract.); 6th-round pick in 2026	

=== Players acquired ===
Date	Player	Former team	Term	Via	Ref
July 1, 2025	Brandon Bussi	Boston Bruins	1-year	Free agency	
July 1, 2025	Nolan Foote	New Jersey Devils	1-year	Free agency	
July 1, 2025	Jeff Petry	Detroit Red Wings	1-year	Free agency	
July 1, 2025	Jack Studnicka	Los Angeles Kings	1-year	Free agency	
August 22, 2025	Luke Kunin	Columbus Blue Jackets	1-year	Free agency	
October 3, 2025	Cole Schwindt	Vegas Golden Knights		Waivers	
October 7, 2025	Noah Gregor	San Jose Sharks	1-year	Free agency	
October 15, 2025	Donovan Sebrango	Ottawa Senators		Waivers	
March 6, 2026	Cole Reinhardt	Vegas Golden Knights		Waivers	

=== Players lost ===
Date	Player	New team	Term	Via	Ref
July 1, 2025	Rasmus Asplund	HC Davos (NL)	2-year	Free agency	
July 1, 2025	Kaapo Kahkonen	Montreal Canadiens	1-year	Free agency	
July 1, 2025	Nate Schmidt	Utah Mammoth	3-year	Free agency	
July 1, 2025	Nico Sturm	Minnesota Wild	2-year	Free agency	
July 1, 2025	Vitek Vanecek	Utah Mammoth	1-year	Free agency	
July 1, 2025	Jaycob Megna	Vegas Golden Knights	2-year	Free agency	
July 2, 2025	Matt Kiersted	Minnesota Wild	2-year	Free agency	
July 7, 2025	Zac Dalpe			Retirement	
October 5, 2025	Brandon Bussi	Carolina Hurricanes		Waivers	

=== Signings ===
Date	Player	Term	Ref
June 30, 2025	Aaron Ekblad	8-year	
July 1, 2025	Kirill Gerasimyuk	2-year†	
July 1, 2025	Brad Marchand	6-year	
July 1, 2025	Tomáš Nosek	1-year	
July 1, 2025	Daniil Tarasov	1-year	
July 3, 2025	MacKenzie Entwistle	2-year	
July 10, 2025	Mackie Samoskevich	1-year	
July 14, 2025	Tobias Björnfot	1-year	
July 14, 2025	Wilmer Skoog	1-year	
August 14, 2025	Mike Benning	1-year	
October 2, 2025	Niko Mikkola	8-year‡	
October 12, 2025	Jonah Gadjovich	2-year‡	
March 4, 2026	Louis Domingue	1-year	

== Draft picks ==
Below are the Florida Panthers' selections at the 2025 NHL entry draft, which was held on June 27 and 28, 2025, at the Peacock Theater in Los Angeles.

Round	#	Player	Pos	Nationality	Team (league)
4	112 (Note: The Calgary Flames' fourth-round pick went to the Florida Panthers as the result of a trade on July 22, 2022, that sent Jonathan Huberdeau, Cole Schwindt, MacKenzie Weegar and a conditional first-round pick in 2025 to Calgary in exchange for Matthew Tkachuk and this pick (being conditional at the time of the trade). The condition – Florida will receive a fourth-round pick in 2025 if Calgary receives Florida's first-round pick in 2025 – was converted when the Panthers qualified for the 2025 Stanley Cup playoffs on April 5, 2025.)	Mads Kongsbak Klyvo	LW	Denmark	Frolunda HC J20 (J20 Nationell)
4	128	Shea Busch	LW	Canada	Everett Silvertips (WHL)
5	129 (Note: The San Jose Sharks' fifth-round pick went to Florida as the result of a trade on July 1, 2023, that sent Anthony Duclair to San Jose in exchange for Steven Lorentz and this pick.)	Shamar Moses	RW	Canada	North Bay Battalion (OHL)
6	192	Arvid Drott	RW	Sweden	Djurgardens IF J20 (J20 Nationell)
7	197 (Note: The Boston Bruins' seventh-round pick went to Florida as the result of a trade on June 28, 2025, that sent a sixth-round pick in 2026 to Chicago in exchange for this pick.)	Brendan Dunphy	D	United States	Wenatchee Wild (WHL)
7	224	Yegor Midlak	G	Russia	JHC Spartak (MHL)
