= 2025–26 Vegas Golden Knights season =

National Hockey League season

2025–26 Vegas Golden Knights
- Western Conference champions
- Pacific Division champions
- Division: 1st Pacific
- Conference: 4th Western
- 2025–26 record: 39–26–17
- Home record: 20–12–9
- Road record: 19–14–8
- Goals for: 265
- Goals against: 250

Team information
- General manager: Kelly McCrimmon
- Coach: Bruce Cassidy (Oct. 8 – Mar. 29); John Tortorella (Mar. 29 – Jun. 16)
- Captain: Mark Stone
- Alternate captains: Jack Eichel; William Karlsson; Alex Pietrangelo
- Arena: T-Mobile Arena
- Minor league affiliates: Henderson Silver Knights (AHL); Tahoe Knight Monsters (ECHL)

Team leaders
- Goals: Pavel Dorofeyev (37)
- Assists: Jack Eichel (63)
- Points: Jack Eichel (90)
- Penalty minutes: Jeremy Lauzon (89)
- Plus/minus: Mark Stone (+26)
- Wins: Akira Schmid (16)
- Goals against average: Akira Schmid (2.59)

The 2025–26 Vegas Golden Knights season was the ninth season for the National Hockey League (NHL) franchise that started playing in the 2017–18 season.

On March 29, 2026, head coach Bruce Cassidy was fired with eight games remaining in the season, after a 32–26–16 start and a 3–5–2 record in the 10 games prior to his dismissal. Veteran NHL coach John Tortorella was named his replacement the same day.

On April 11, the Golden Knights clinched a playoff berth for the eighth time in nine seasons after a 3–2 overtime win against the Colorado Avalanche. Four days later, Vegas clinched their second consecutive and fifth overall Pacific Division title with a 4–1 win over the Seattle Kraken. In the Stanley Cup playoffs, the Golden Knights advanced to the Western Conference finals for the fifth time in their nine seasons, where they defeated the Presidents' Trophy-winning Avalanche in a four-game sweep to reach their third Stanley Cup Final. Taking on the Carolina Hurricanes, Las Vegas opened the series with a 1–0 and a 2–1 lead after Game 3, but the team would eventually lose in six games, concluding with a 3–0 shutout loss. Just a few days following the team's defeat, Vegas announced the team was parting ways with Tortorella.

== Standings ==
=== Divisional standings ===
Pacific Division
Pos	Team	GP	W	L	OTL	RW	GF	GA	GD	Pts
1	y – Vegas Golden Knights	82	39	26	17	30	265	250	+15	95
2	x – Edmonton Oilers	82	41	30	11	32	282	269	+13	93
3	x – Anaheim Ducks	82	43	33	6	26	273	288	−15	92
4	x – Los Angeles Kings	82	35	27	20	22	225	247	−22	90
5	San Jose Sharks	82	39	35	8	27	251	292	−41	86
6	Seattle Kraken	82	34	37	11	26	226	263	−37	79
7	Calgary Flames	82	34	39	9	27	212	259	−47	77
8	Vancouver Canucks	82	25	49	8	15	216	316	−100	58

Source: National Hockey League
Rules for classification: 1) Fewer number of games played (GP, only during regular season); 2) Greater number of regulation wins (RW); 3) Greater number of wins in regulation and overtime, excluding shootout wins (ROW); 4) Greater number of total wins, including shootouts (W); 5) Greater number of points earned in head-to-head play; if teams played an uneven number of head-to-head games, the result of the first game on the home ice of the team with the extra home game is discarded; 6) Greater goal differential (GD); 7) Greater number of goals scored (GF)
x – Clinched playoff spot; y – Clinched division

=== Conference standings ===
Western Conference Wild Card
Pos	Div	Team	GP	W	L	OTL	RW	GF	GA	GD	Pts
1	CE	x – Utah Mammoth	82	43	33	6	33	268	240	+28	92
2	PA	x – Los Angeles Kings	82	35	27	20	22	225	247	−22	90
3	CE	St. Louis Blues	82	37	33	12	33	231	258	−27	86
4	CE	Nashville Predators	82	38	34	10	28	247	269	−22	86
5	PA	San Jose Sharks	82	39	35	8	27	251	292	−41	86
6	CE	Winnipeg Jets	82	35	35	12	28	231	260	−29	82
7	PA	Seattle Kraken	82	34	37	11	26	226	263	−37	79
8	PA	Calgary Flames	82	34	39	9	27	212	259	−47	77
9	CE	Chicago Blackhawks	82	29	39	14	22	213	275	−62	72
10	PA	Vancouver Canucks	82	25	49	8	15	216	316	−100	58

Source: National Hockey League
Rules for classification: 1) Fewer number of games played (GP, only during regular season); 2) Greater number of regulation wins (RW); 3) Greater number of wins in regulation and overtime, excluding shootout wins (ROW); 4) Greater number of total wins, including shootouts (W); 5) Greater number of points earned in head-to-head play; if teams played an uneven number of head-to-head games, the result of the first game on the home ice of the team with the extra home game is discarded; 6) Greater goal differential (GD); 7) Greater number of goals scored (GF)
x – Clinched playoff spot

== Schedule and results ==
=== Preseason ===
The 2025 preseason schedule was published on June 20, 2025.

2025 preseason game log: 3–4–0 (home: 2–2–0; road: 1–2–0)
#	Date	Visitor	Score	Home	OT	Decision	Attendance	Record	Recap
1	September 21	Vegas	0–3	San Jose		Lindbom	11,613	0–1–0
2	September 23	Los Angeles	3–1	Vegas		Schmid	17,439	0–2–0
3	September 25	Utah	2–3	Vegas	OT	Hill	17,383	1–2–0
4	September 26	Vegas	2–1	San Jose		Schmid	11,143	2–2–0
5	September 30	Vegas	2–4	Colorado		Lindbom	13,150	2–3–0
6	October 1	Colorado	1–2	Vegas		Schmid	17,409	3–3–0
7	October 3	San Jose	4–1	Vegas		Hill	17,488	3–4–0

=== Regular season ===
The regular season schedule was published on July 16, 2025.

2025–26 game log

October: 6–2–3 (home: 3–1–1; road: 3–1–2)
#	Date	Visitor	Score	Home	OT	Decision	Attendance	Record	Pts	Recap
1	October 8	Los Angeles	6–5	Vegas	SO	Hill	18,393	0–0–1	1
2	October 9	Vegas	4–3	San Jose	OT	Schmid	17,435	1–0–1	3
3	October 11	Vegas	1–2	Seattle	OT	Hill	17,151	1–0–2	4
4	October 14	Vegas	4–2	Calgary		Schmid	16,553	2–0–2	6
5	October 16	Boston	5–6	Vegas		Schmid	17,927	3–0–2	8
6	October 18	Calgary	1–6	Vegas		Hill	17,811	4–0–2	10
7	October 20	Carolina	1–4	Vegas		Schmid	17,682	5–0–2	12
8	October 25	Vegas	0–3	Florida		Schmid	19,558	5–1–2	12
9	October 26	Vegas	1–2	Tampa Bay	OT	Lindbom	19,092	5–1–3	13
10	October 28	Vegas	6–3	Carolina		Schmid	18,299	6–1–3	15
11	October 31	Colorado	4–2	Vegas		Lindbom	17,889	6–2–3	15

November: 5–4–5 (home: 3–3–3; road: 2–1–2)
#	Date	Visitor	Score	Home	OT	Decision	Attendance	Record	Pts	Recap
12	November 4	Detroit	0–1	Vegas		Schmid	18,025	7–2–3	17
13	November 6	Tampa Bay	6–3	Vegas		Lindbom	17,717	7–3–3	17
14	November 8	Anaheim	4–3	Vegas	OT	Schmid	17,977	7–3–4	18
15	November 10	Florida	3–2	Vegas		Lindbom	17,812	7–4–4	18
16	November 13	NY Islanders	4–3	Vegas	OT	Schmid	17,733	7–4–5	19
17	November 15	Vegas	4–1	St. Louis		Schmid	18,096	8–4–5	21
18	November 16	Vegas	2–3	Minnesota	OT	Lindbom	17,439	8–4–6	22
19	November 18	NY Rangers	2–3	Vegas		Schmid	18,008	9–4–6	24
20	November 20	Vegas	4–1	Utah		Schmid	12,478	10–4–6	26
21	November 22	Vegas	3–4	Anaheim	OT	Schmid	17,174	10–4–7	27
22	November 24	Vegas	1–5	Utah		Lindbom	12,478	10–5–7	27
23	November 26	Ottawa	4–3	Vegas	SO	Schmid	17,791	10–5–8	28
24	November 28	Montreal	4–1	Vegas		Schmid	17,739	10–6–8	28
25	November 29	San Jose	3–4	Vegas		Lindbom	17,919	11–6–8	30

December: 6–4–3 (home: 1–2–2; road: 4–2–1)
#	Date	Visitor	Score	Home	OT	Decision	Attendance	Record	Pts	Recap
26	December 2	Chicago	3–4	Vegas	SO	Hart	17,944	12–6–8	32
27	December 5	Vegas	3–0	New Jersey		Schmid	15,842	13–6–8	34
28	December 7	Vegas	3–2	NY Rangers	OT	Hart	17,486	14–6–8	36
29	December 9	Vegas	4–5	NY Islanders	SO	Hart	13,514	14–6–9	37
30	December 11	Vegas	3–2	Philadelphia	OT	Schmid	17,585	15–6–9	39
32	December 13	Vegas	3–2	Columbus		Hart	16,965	16–6–9	41
32	December 17	New Jersey	2–1	Vegas	SO	Hart	17,862	16–6–10	42
33	December 20	Vegas	3–6	Calgary		Schmid	18,256	16–7–10	42
34	December 21	Vegas	3–4	Edmonton		Hart	18,347	16–8–10	42
35	December 23	San Jose	2–7	Vegas		Hart	18,092	17–8–10	44
36	December 27	Colorado	6–5	Vegas	SO	Hart	18,168	17–8–11	45
37	December 29	Minnesota	5–2	Vegas		Hart	18,102	17–9–11	45
38	December 31	Nashville	4–2	Vegas		Schmid	17,970	17–10–11	45

January: 8–5–3 (home: 4–2–1; road: 4–3–2)
#	Date	Visitor	Score	Home	OT	Decision	Attendance	Record	Pts	Recap
39	January 2	Vegas	3–4	St. Louis		Hart	18,096	17–11–11	45
40	January 4	Vegas	2–3	Chicago	OT	Schmid	18,266	17–11–12	46
41	January 6	Vegas	4–3	Winnipeg	OT	Hart	13,951	18–11–12	48
42	January 8	Columbus	3–5	Vegas		Schmid	17,614	19–11–12	50
43	January 10	St. Louis	2–4	Vegas		Schmid	17,955	20–11–12	52
44	January 11	Vegas	7–2	San Jose		Lindbom	17,435	21–11–12	54
45	January 14	Vegas	3–2	Los Angeles	OT	Schmid	18,145	22–11–12	56
46	January 15	Toronto	5–6	Vegas	OT	Hill	17,975	23–11–12	58
47	January 17	Nashville	2–7	Vegas		Schmid	17,988	24–11–12	60
48	January 19	Philadelphia	2–1	Vegas		Hill	17,867	24–12–12	60
49	January 22	Vegas	3–4	Boston		Schmid	17,850	24–13–12	60
50	January 23	Vegas	6–3	Toronto		Hill	19,305	25–13–12	62
51	January 25	Vegas	1–7	Ottawa		Hill	17,025	25–14–12	62
52	January 27	Vegas	2–3	Montreal	OT	Schmid	20,962	25–14–13	63
53	January 29	Dallas	5–4	Vegas	SO	Hill	17,888	25–14–14	64
54	January 31	Seattle	3–2	Vegas		Schmid	18,141	25–15–14	64

February: 3–2–0 (home: 2–0–0; road: 1–2–0)
#	Date	Visitor	Score	Home	OT	Decision	Attendance	Record	Pts	Recap
55	February 1	Vegas	3–4	Anaheim		Hill	16,214	25–16–14	64
56	February 4	Vancouver	2–5	Vegas		Schmid	17,622	26–16–14	66
57	February 5	Los Angeles	1–4	Vegas		Hill	18,020	27–16–14	68
58	February 25	Vegas	6–4	Los Angeles		Hill	18,145	28–16–14	70
59	February 27	Vegas	2–3	Washington		Schmid	18,347	28–17–14	70

March: 5–9–2 (home: 3–4–2; road: 2–5–0)
#	Date	Visitor	Score	Home	OT	Decision	Attendance	Record	Pts	Recap
60	March 1	Vegas	0–5	Pittsburgh		Hill	18,195	28–18–14	70
61	March 3	Vegas	2–3	Buffalo		Schmid	19,070	28–19–14	70
62	March 4	Vegas	4–3	Detroit	OT	Hill	19,515	29–19–14	72
63	March 6	Minnesota	4–2	Vegas		Schmid	18,116	29–20–14	72
64	March 8	Edmonton	4–2	Vegas		Hill	17,960	29–21–14	72
65	March 10	Vegas	1–2	Dallas		Hill	18,532	29–22–14	72
66	March 12	Pittsburgh	2–6	Vegas		Hill	17,949	30–22–14	74
67	March 14	Chicago	0–4	Vegas		Hill	18,128	31–22–14	76
68	March 17	Buffalo	2–0	Vegas		Hill	17,844	31–23–14	76
69	March 19	Utah	4–0	Vegas		Hill	17,875	31–24–14	76
70	March 21	Vegas	1–4	Nashville		Schmid	17,439	31–25–14	76
71	March 22	Vegas	3–2	Dallas		Hill	18,532	32–25–14	78
72	March 24	Vegas	1–4	Winnipeg		Hill	13,478	32–26–14	78
73	March 26	Edmonton	4–3	Vegas	OT	Hill	17,910	32–26–15	79
74	March 28	Washington	5–4	Vegas	SO	Hill	17,922	32–26–16	80
75	March 30	Vancouver	2–4	Vegas		Hill	17,810	33–26–16	82

April: 6–0–1 (home: 3–0–0; road: 3–0–1)
#	Date	Visitor	Score	Home	OT	Decision	Attendance	Record	Pts	Recap
76	April 2	Calgary	3–6	Vegas		Hart	17,912	34–26–16	84
77	April 4	Vegas	5–1	Edmonton		Hart	18,347	35–26–16	86
78	April 7	Vegas	2–1	Vancouver		Hart	18,691	36–26–16	88
79	April 9	Vegas	3–4	Seattle	SO	Hill	17,151	36–26–17	89
80	April 11	Vegas	3–2	Colorado	OT	Hart	18,152	37–26–17	91
81	April 13	Winnipeg	2–6	Vegas		Hart	17,936	38–26–17	93
82	April 15	Seattle	1–4	Vegas		Hart	18,090	39–26–17	95

Legend: Win (2 points) Loss (0 points) Overtime/shootout loss (1 point)

=== Playoffs ===
2026 Stanley Cup playoffs

Western Conference first round vs. (WC1) Utah Mammoth: Vegas won 4–2
#	Date	Visitor	Score	Home	OT	Decision	Attendance	Series	Recap
1	April 19	Utah	2–4	Vegas		Hart	17,979	1–0
2	April 21	Utah	3–2	Vegas		Hart	17,871	1–1
3	April 24	Vegas	2–4	Utah		Hart	12,478	1–2
4	April 27	Vegas	5–4	Utah	OT	Hart	12,478	2–2
5	April 29	Utah	4–5	Vegas	2OT	Hart	18,033	3–2
6	May 1	Vegas	5–1	Utah		Hart	12,478	4–2

Western Conference second round vs. (P3) Anaheim Ducks: Vegas won 4–2
#	Date	Visitor	Score	Home	OT	Decision	Attendance	Series	Recap
1	May 4	Anaheim	1–3	Vegas		Hart	17,838	1–0
2	May 6	Anaheim	3–1	Vegas		Hart	18,018	1–1
3	May 8	Vegas	6–2	Anaheim		Hart	16,826	2–1
4	May 10	Vegas	3–4	Anaheim		Hart	16,800	2–2
5	May 12	Anaheim	2–3	Vegas	OT	Hart	18,089	3–2
6	May 14	Vegas	5–1	Anaheim		Hart	16,778	4–2

Western Conference final vs. (C1) Colorado Avalanche: Vegas won 4–0
#	Date	Visitor	Score	Home	OT	Decision	Attendance	Series	Recap
1	May 20	Vegas	4–2	Colorado		Hart	18,109	1–0
2	May 22	Vegas	3–1	Colorado		Hart	18,147	2–0
3	May 24	Colorado	3–5	Vegas		Hart	18,212	3–0
4	May 26	Colorado	1–2	Vegas		Hart	18,188	4–0

Stanley Cup Final vs. (M1) Carolina Hurricanes: Carolina won 4–2
#	Date	Visitor	Score	Home	OT	Decision	Attendance	Series	Recap
1	June 2	Vegas	5–4	Carolina		Hart	18,738	1–0
2	June 4	Vegas	3–4	Carolina	OT	Hart	18,710	1–1
3	June 6	Carolina	4–5	Vegas	2OT	Hart	18,233	2–1
4	June 9	Carolina	5–3	Vegas		Hart	18,339	2–2
5	June 11	Vegas	2–4	Carolina		Hart	18,761	2–3
6	June 14	Carolina	3–0	Vegas		Hart	18,354	2–4

Legend: Win Loss

== Player statistics ==
Updated to games played June 14, 2026

=== Skaters ===
Regular season
Player	GP	G	A	Pts	+/−	PIM
Jack Eichel	74	27	63	90	+23	18
Mitch Marner	81	24	56	80	+17	24
Mark Stone	60	28	45	73	+26	9
Pavel Dorofeyev	82	37	27	64	–3	24
Ivan Barbashev	82	23	38	61	+20	14
Tomas Hertl	82	24	34	58	–17	39
Shea Theodore	70	10	29	39	+19	24
Noah Hanifin	71	3	25	28	0	14
Reilly Smith	69	16	10	26	–9	4
Braeden Bowman	54	8	18	26	–16	12
Brett Howden	58	12	10	22	–9	41
Rasmus Andersson^{†}	33	7	10	17	+1	18
Keegan Kolesar	82	6	11	17	–14	55
Kaedan Korczak	78	3	13	16	+6	26
Ben Hutton	55	6	9	15	+2	19
Jeremy Lauzon	68	1	12	13	–3	**89**
Brayden McNabb	63	5	7	12	+2	26
Colton Sissons	66	6	5	11	–11	28
Alexander Holtz	28	3	6	9	–1	10
Brandon Saad	49	3	6	9	–7	14
William Karlsson	14	4	3	7	–1	4
Cole Reinhardt^{‡}	44	3	4	7	–6	19
Zach Whitecloud^{‡}	47	2	5	7	–8	20
Nic Dowd^{†}	20	1	4	5	+2	20
Tanner Laczynski	10	0	5	5	0	4
Cole Smith^{†}	21	2	0	2	0	9
Jonas Rondbjerg	4	0	1	1	–2	0
Raphael Lavoie	1	0	0	0	0	0
Dylan Coghlan	3	0	0	0	+1	2
Kai Uchacz	3	0	0	0	–1	5
Jaycob Megna	4	0	0	0	–5	2

Playoffs
Player	GP	G	A	Pts	+/−	PIM
Mitch Marner	22	10	19	**29**	+11	6
Jack Eichel	22	2	**20**	22	+4	16
Brett Howden	22	**14**	4	18	+11	6
Shea Theodore	22	6	12	18	+10	10
Pavel Dorofeyev	22	12	4	16	+2	0
Ivan Barbashev	22	6	8	14	0	8
Tomas Hertl	22	5	9	14	–2	6
Mark Stone	17	7	5	12	–3	10
Brayden McNabb	21	1	9	10	+13	23
William Karlsson	15	3	6	9	+10	4
Colton Sissons	22	2	6	8	+4	6
Noah Hanifin	22	0	7	7	+2	2
Cole Smith	22	3	3	6	+3	24
Rasmus Andersson	22	0	6	6	+2	18
Nic Dowd	22	3	1	4	–2	8
Dylan Coghlan	13	1	2	3	+4	4
Kaedan Korczak	13	0	3	3	+1	0
Brandon Saad	5	0	2	2	0	0
Reilly Smith	7	0	2	2	–3	2
Keegan Kolesar	21	1	0	1	–2	6
Ben Hutton	7	0	1	1	+1	4
Braeden Bowman	1	0	0	0	0	0
Jeremy Lauzon	12	0	0	0	–5	6

=== Goaltenders ===
Regular season
Player	GP	GS	TOI	W	L	OT	GA	GAA	SA	SV%	SO	G	A	PIM
Akira Schmid	34	29	1,965:47	16	10	6	85	2.59	791	.893	2	0	1	0
Carter Hart	18	18	1,019:47	11	3	3	46	2.71	422	.891	0	0	0	2
Adin Hill	27	27	1,497:49	10	9	6	76	3.04	587	.871	1	0	1	2
Carl Lindbom	8	8	480:40	2	4	2	24	3.00	189	.873	0	0	0	0

Playoffs
Player	GP	GS	TOI	W	L	GA	GAA	SA	SV%	SO	G	A	PIM
Carter Hart	22	22	1,380:19	**14**	8	59	2.56	637	.909	0	0	0	2

^{†}Denotes player spent time with another team before joining the Golden Knights. Stats reflect time with the Golden Knights only.
^{‡}Denotes player was traded or waived mid-season. Stats reflect time with the Golden Knights only.
Bold denotes new franchise record.

== Transactions ==
The Golden Knights were involved in the following transactions during the 2025–26 season.

Key:

† Contract is entry-level.
‡ Contract initially takes effect in the 2026–27 season.

=== Trades ===
* Retained Salary Transaction: Each team is allowed up to three contracts on their payroll where they have retained salary in a trade (i.e. the player no longer plays with Team A due to a trade to Team B, but Team A still retains some salary). Only up to 50% of a player's contract can be kept, and only up to 15% of a team's salary cap can be taken up by retained salary. A contract can only be involved in one of these trades twice.

Date	Details		Ref
June 28, 2025	To Nashville Predators 2nd-round pick in 2025; 4th-round pick in 2025	To Vegas Golden Knights TBL 2nd-round pick in 2025	
June 28, 2025	To Pittsburgh Penguins WSH 3rd-round pick in 2025; 5th-round pick in 2025	To Vegas Golden Knights OTT 3rd-round pick in 2025	
June 30, 2025	To Nashville Predators Nicolas Hague conditional (Note: Nashville will receive Vegas' second-round pick in 2027 if Vegas wins at least two rounds of the 2026 Stanley Cup Playoffs; otherwise, Nashville will receive Vegas' third-round pick in 2027.) 2nd-round pick in 2027 or 3rd-round pick in 2027	To Vegas Golden Knights Jeremy Lauzon; Colton Sissons*	
July 1, 2025	To Toronto Maple Leafs Nicolas Roy	To Vegas Golden Knights Mitch Marner	
January 18, 2026	To Calgary Flames Zach Whitecloud; Abram Wiebe conditional (Note: Calgary will receive Vegas' first-round pick in 2027 if the pick is outside of the top 10; if the pick is in the top 10 and Vegas fails to win the 2026 Stanley Cup, Calgary will receive Vegas' first-round pick in 2028; otherwise, Calgary will receive Vegas' first-round pick in 2029.) 1st-round pick in 2027 or 1st-round pick in 2028 or 1st-round pick in 2029 conditional (Note: Calgary will receive Vegas' first-round pick in 2028 if Vegas wins the 2026 Stanley Cup; otherwise Calgary will receive Vegas' second-round pick in 2028.) 1st-round pick in 2028 or 2nd-round pick in 2028	To Vegas Golden Knights Rasmus Andersson*	
March 3, 2026	To Nashville Predators Christoffer Sedoff; 3rd-round pick in 2028	To Vegas Golden Knights Cole Smith	
March 5, 2026	To Washington Capitals Jesper Vikman; 2nd-round pick in 2029; 3rd-round pick in 2027	To Vegas Golden Knights Nic Dowd	
June 26, 2026	To New York Rangers Pavel Dorofeyev	To Vegas Golden Knights DAL 1st-round pick in 2026 (#26 overall); BUF 3rd-round pick in 2026 (#92 overall) conditional (Note: Vegas will receive New York's 1st-round pick in 2028 if it is outside of the top-10; otherwise, Vegas will receive New York's first-round pick in 2029.) 1st-round pick in 2028 or 1st-round pick in 2029	
June 26, 2026	To Montreal Canadiens DAL 1st-round pick in 2026 (#26 overall)	To Vegas Golden Knights 1st-round pick in 2026 (#28 overall); 3rd-round pick in 2027	
June 26, 2026	To Anaheim Ducks MTL 1st-round pick in 2026 (#28 overall)	To Vegas Golden Knights COL 1st-round pick in 2026 (#29 overall); PHI 4th-round pick in 2026 (#117 overall)	
June 27, 2026	To Montreal Canadiens PHI 4th-round pick in 2026 (#117 overall); 7th-round pick in 2026 (#223 overall)	To Vegas Golden Knights LAK 4th-round pick in 2026 (#113 overall)	
June 27, 2026	To Detroit Red Wings 7th-round pick in 2027	To Vegas Golden Knights 7th-round pick in 2026 (#207 overall)	
June 29, 2026	To Florida Panthers Akira Schmid	To Vegas Golden Knights 3rd-round pick in 2028	
June 30, 2026	To Pittsburgh Penguins Kaedan Korczak	To Vegas Golden Knights Parker Wotherspoon* (Note: Pittsburgh retained 50% of Wotherspoon's contract.)	

=== Players acquired ===
Date	Player	Former team	Term	Via	Ref
July 1, 2025	Dylan Coghlan	Winnipeg Jets	1-year	Free agency	
July 1, 2025	Jaycob Megna	Florida Panthers	2-year	Free agency	
July 1, 2025	Cole Reinhardt	Ottawa Senators	2-year	Free agency	
October 5, 2025 (Note: Davies' contract was announced on July 2, 2025, but not formally signed until October 5 for salary cap reasons; in the interim period, Davies joined the team on an AHL contract.)	Jeremy Davies	Ottawa Senators	2-year	Free agency	
October 24, 2025	Carter Hart	Philadelphia Flyers	2-year	Free agency	
March 14, 2026	Bronson Ride	North Bay Battalion (OHL)	3-year†‡	Free agency	
Legend: † Contract is entry-level. ‡ Contract begins in 2026–27 season.

=== Players lost ===
Date	Player	New team	Term	Via	Ref
July 1, 2025	Mason Geertsen	Buffalo Sabres	2-year	Free agency	
July 1, 2025	Tanner Pearson	Winnipeg Jets	1-year	Free agency	
July 16, 2025	Dysin Mayo	Columbus Blue Jackets	1-year	Free agency	
July 17, 2025	Isaiah Saville	Ontario Reign (AHL)	1-year	Free agency	
August 15, 2025	Gage Quinney	Shanghai Dragons (KHL)	1-year	Free agency	
August 20, 2025	Victor Olofsson	Colorado Avalanche	1-year	Free agency	
August 21, 2025	Mason Morelli	Barys Astana (KHL)	1-year	Free agency	
October 3, 2025	Cole Schwindt	Florida Panthers		Waivers	
October 6, 2025	Callahan Burke	San Diego Gulls (AHL)	1-year	Free agency	
November 1, 2025	Ilya Samsonov	HC Sochi (KHL)	2-year	Free agency	
March 6, 2026	Cole Reinhardt	Florida Panthers		Waivers	
May 18, 2026	Jakub Brabenec	HC Kometa Brno (ELH)	2-year‡	Free agency	
Legend: ‡ Contract begins in 2026–27 season.

=== Signings ===
Date	Player	Term	Ref
July 1, 2025	Brandon Saad	1-year	
July 1, 2025	Reilly Smith	1-year	
July 2, 2025	Kaedan Korczak	4-year‡	
July 6, 2025	Raphael Lavoie	1-year	
July 6, 2025	Jonas Rondbjerg	1-year	
July 6, 2025	Cole Schwindt	1-year	
July 8, 2025	Lukas Cormier	1-year	
October 7, 2025	Alexander Holtz	2-year	
October 8, 2025	Jack Eichel	8-year‡	
March 1, 2026	Alexander Weiermair	3–year†‡	
March 23, 2026	Pavel Moysevich	3–year†‡	
June 28, 2026	Carl Lindbom	3–year‡	
Legend: † Contract is entry-level. ‡ Contract begins in 2026–27 season.

== Draft picks ==
Below are the Vegas Golden Knights' selections at the 2025 NHL entry draft, which was held on June 27 to 28, 2025, at the Peacock Theater in Los Angeles.

Round	#	Player	Pos.	Nationality	Team (League)
2	55 (Note: The Tampa Bay Lightning's second-round pick went to the Vegas Golden Knights as the result of a trade on June 28, 2025, that sent a second-round and a fifth-round pick both in 2025 (58th and 122nd overall) to Nashville in exchange for this pick.)	Jakob Ihs-Wozniak	C	Sweden	Lulea HF (J20 Nationell)
3	85 (Note: The Ottawa Senators' third-round pick went to the Golden Knights as the result of a trade on June 28, 2025, that sent Washington's third-round pick in 2025 (91st overall) and a fifth-round pick in 2025 (154th overall) to Pittsburgh in exchange for this pick.)	Mateo Nobert	C	Canada	Blainville-Boisbriand Armada (QMJHL)
6	186	Alexander Weiermair	C	United States	Portland Winterhawks (WHL)
6	187 (Note: The Washington Capitals' sixth-round pick went to the Golden Knights as the result of a trade on June 29, 2024, that sent a seventh-round pick in 2024 to Washington in exchange for this pick.)	Gustav Sjoqvist	D	Sweden	AIK IF (HockeyAllsvenskan)
