= 2025–26 Calgary Flames season =

National Hockey League season

2025–26 Calgary Flames
- Division: 7th Pacific
- Conference: 14th Western
- 2025–26 record: 34–39–9
- Home record: 23–13–5
- Road record: 11–26–3
- Goals for: 216
- Goals against: 316

Team information
- General manager: Craig Conroy
- Coach: Ryan Huska
- Captain: Mikael Backlund
- Alternate captains: Rasmus Andersson (Oct. 8 – Jan. 18); Blake Coleman; Jonathan Huberdeau; Nazem Kadri (Oct. 8 – Mar. 6); MacKenzie Weegar (Oct. 8 – Mar. 4)
- Arena: Scotiabank Saddledome
- Minor league affiliates: Calgary Wranglers (AHL); Rapid City Rush (ECHL)

Team leaders
- Goals: Morgan Frost (22)
- Assists: Nazem Kadri (29)
- Points: Matt Coronato (45)
- Penalty minutes: Adam Klapka (112)
- Plus/minus: Blake Coleman (+12)
- Wins: Dustin Wolf (23)
- Goals against average: Devin Cooley (2.69)

The 2025–26 Calgary Flames season was their 46th season in Calgary, and their 54th season for the National Hockey League (NHL) franchise that was established on June 6, 1972.

On March 20, 2026, the Flames announced the farewell season of the Scotiabank Saddledome.

On April 7, 2026, the Flames were eliminated from playoff contention for the fourth consecutive season following a 4–3 overtime loss to the Dallas Stars.

== Standings ==
=== Divisional standings ===
Pacific Division
Pos	Team	GP	W	L	OTL	RW	GF	GA	GD	Pts
1	y – Vegas Golden Knights	82	39	26	17	30	265	250	+15	95
2	x – Edmonton Oilers	82	41	30	11	32	282	269	+13	93
3	x – Anaheim Ducks	82	43	33	6	26	273	288	−15	92
4	x – Los Angeles Kings	82	35	27	20	22	225	247	−22	90
5	San Jose Sharks	82	39	35	8	27	251	292	−41	86
6	Seattle Kraken	82	34	37	11	26	226	263	−37	79
7	Calgary Flames	82	34	39	9	27	212	259	−47	77
8	Vancouver Canucks	82	25	49	8	15	216	316	−100	58

Source: National Hockey League
Rules for classification: 1) Fewer number of games played (GP, only during regular season); 2) Greater number of regulation wins (RW); 3) Greater number of wins in regulation and overtime, excluding shootout wins (ROW); 4) Greater number of total wins, including shootouts (W); 5) Greater number of points earned in head-to-head play; if teams played an uneven number of head-to-head games, the result of the first game on the home ice of the team with the extra home game is discarded; 6) Greater goal differential (GD); 7) Greater number of goals scored (GF)
x – Clinched playoff spot; y – Clinched division

=== Conference standings ===
Western Conference Wild Card
Pos	Div	Team	GP	W	L	OTL	RW	GF	GA	GD	Pts
1	CE	x – Utah Mammoth	82	43	33	6	33	268	240	+28	92
2	PA	x – Los Angeles Kings	82	35	27	20	22	225	247	−22	90
3	CE	St. Louis Blues	82	37	33	12	33	231	258	−27	86
4	CE	Nashville Predators	82	38	34	10	28	247	269	−22	86
5	PA	San Jose Sharks	82	39	35	8	27	251	292	−41	86
6	CE	Winnipeg Jets	82	35	35	12	28	231	260	−29	82
7	PA	Seattle Kraken	82	34	37	11	26	226	263	−37	79
8	PA	Calgary Flames	82	34	39	9	27	212	259	−47	77
9	CE	Chicago Blackhawks	82	29	39	14	22	213	275	−62	72
10	PA	Vancouver Canucks	82	25	49	8	15	216	316	−100	58

Source: National Hockey League
Rules for classification: 1) Fewer number of games played (GP, only during regular season); 2) Greater number of regulation wins (RW); 3) Greater number of wins in regulation and overtime, excluding shootout wins (ROW); 4) Greater number of total wins, including shootouts (W); 5) Greater number of points earned in head-to-head play; if teams played an uneven number of head-to-head games, the result of the first game on the home ice of the team with the extra home game is discarded; 6) Greater goal differential (GD); 7) Greater number of goals scored (GF)
x – Clinched playoff spot

== Schedule and results ==
=== Preseason ===
The preseason schedule was published on June 30, 2025.

2025 preseason game log: 2–3–0 (Home: 1–1–0; Road: 1–2–0)
#	Date	Visitor	Score	Home	OT	Decision	Location	Attendance	Record	Recap
1^{A}	September 21	Edmonton	3–0	Calgary		Cooley	Scotiabank Saddledome	10,000	0–1–0
2^{A}	September 21	Calgary	3–2	Edmonton	OT	Prosvetov	Rogers Place	16,147	1–1–0
3	September 23	Seattle	1–4	Calgary		Wolf	Scotiabank Saddledome	15,088	2–1–0
4^{B}	September 24	Calgary	1–3	Vancouver		Prosvetov	Abbotsford Centre	5,785	2–2–0
5	September 27	Calgary	2–4	Winnipeg		Cooley	Canada Life Centre	14,007	2–3–0
6	September 29	Calgary	2–1	Seattle	SO	Wolf	Climate Pledge Arena	17,151	3–3–0
7	October 1	Vancouver	8–1	Calgary		Prosvetov	Scotiabank Saddledome	15,804	3–4–0
8	October 3	Winnipeg	5–4	Calgary	SO	Wolf	Scotiabank Saddledome	15,923	3–4–1
Notes:^{A} Indicates split-squad. ^{B} Game played at Abbotsford.

=== Regular season ===
2025–26 game log

October: 2–8–2 (Home: 1–3–1; Road: 1–5–1)
#	Date	Visitor	Score	Home	OT	Goalie	Venue	Attendance	Record	Points	Recap
1	October 8	Calgary	4–3	Edmonton	SO	Wolf	Rogers Place	18,347	1–0–0	2
2	October 9	Calgary	1–5	Vancouver		Wolf	Rogers Arena	19,012	1–1–0	2
3	October 11	St. Louis	4–2	Calgary		Wolf	Scotiabank Saddledome	17,774	1–2–0	2
4	October 14	Vegas	4–2	Calgary		Wolf	Scotiabank Saddledome	16,553	1–3–0	2
5	October 15	Calgary	1–3	Utah		Cooley	Delta Center	12,478	1–4–0	2
6	October 18	Calgary	1–6	Vegas		Wolf	T-Mobile Arena	17,811	1–5–0	2
7	October 20	Winnipeg	2–1	Calgary		Wolf	Scotiabank Saddledome	16,800	1–6–0	2
8	October 22	Montreal	2–1	Calgary	OT	Wolf	Scotiabank Saddledome	17,826	1–6–1	3
9	October 24	Calgary	3–5	Winnipeg		Wolf	Canada Life Centre	13,967	1–7–1	3
10	October 26	NY Rangers	1–5	Calgary		Wolf	Scotiabank Saddledome	17,196	2–7–1	5
11	October 28	Calgary	3–4	Toronto		Wolf	Scotiabank Arena	18,454	2–8–1	5
12	October 30	Calgary	3–4	Ottawa	SO	Cooley	Canadian Tire Centre	16,790	2–8–2	6

November: 7–6–2 (Home: 3–1–1; Road: 4–5–1)
#	Date	Visitor	Score	Home	OT	Decision	Venue	Attendance	Record	Points	Recap
13	November 1	Calgary	2–4	Nashville		Wolf	Bridgestone Arena	17,159	2–9–2	6
14	November 2	Calgary	2–1	Philadelphia		Wolf	Xfinity Mobile Arena	15,291	3–9–2	8
15	November 5	Columbus	1–5	Calgary		Wolf	Scotiabank Saddledome	16,802	4–9–2	10
16	November 7	Chicago	4–0	Calgary		Wolf	Scotiabank Saddledome	17,425	4–10–2	10
17	November 9	Calgary	0–2	Minnesota		Cooley	Grand Casino Arena	17,090	4–11–2	10
18	November 11	Calgary	2–3	St. Louis		Wolf	Enterprise Center	18,096	4–12–2	10
19	November 13	San Jose	0–2	Calgary		Wolf	Scotiabank Saddledome	17,551	5–12–2	12
20	November 15	Winnipeg	4–3	Calgary	SO	Wolf	Scotiabank Saddledome	17,494	5–12–3	13
21	November 18	Calgary	2–5	Chicago		Wolf	United Center	17,518	5–13–3	13
22	November 19	Calgary	6–2	Buffalo		Cooley	KeyBank Center	15,213	6–13–3	15
23	November 22	Dallas	2–3	Calgary	SO	Cooley	Scotiabank Saddledome	17,566	7–13–3	17
24	November 23	Calgary	5–2	Vancouver		Wolf	Rogers Arena	18,671	8–13–3	19
25	November 26	Calgary	1–5	Tampa Bay		Wolf	Benchmark International Arena	19,092	8–14–3	19
26	November 28	Calgary	5–3	Florida		Cooley	Amerant Bank Arena	19,664	9–14–3	21
27	November 30	Calgary	0–1	Carolina	OT	Cooley	Lenovo Center	18,299	9–14–4	22

December: 9–4–0 (Home: 8–1–0; Road: 1–3–0)
#	Date	Visitor	Score	Home	OT	Decision	Venue	Attendance	Record	Points	Recap
28	December 2	Calgary	1–5	Nashville		Cooley	Bridgestone Arena	17,159	9–15–4	22
29	December 4	Minnesota	1–4	Calgary		Wolf	Scotiabank Saddledome	16,924	10–15–4	24
30	December 6	Utah	0–2	Calgary		Wolf	Scotiabank Saddledome	17,541	11–15–4	26
31	December 8	Buffalo	4–7	Calgary		Wolf	Scotiabank Saddledome	16,278	12–15–4	28
32	December 10	Detroit	4–3	Calgary		Cooley	Scotiabank Saddledome	17,055	12–16–4	28
33	December 13	Calgary	2–1	Los Angeles	OT	Wolf	Crypto.com Arena	18,145	13–16–4	30
34	December 16	Calgary	3–6	San Jose		Wolf	SAP Center	14,261	13–17–4	30
35	December 18	Seattle	2–4	Calgary		Wolf	Scotiabank Saddledome	17,449	14–17–4	32
36	December 20	Vegas	3–6	Calgary		Cooley	Scotiabank Saddledome	18,256	15–17–4	34
37	December 23	Calgary	1–5	Edmonton		Wolf	Rogers Place	18,347	15–18–4	34
38	December 27	Edmonton	2–3	Calgary		Wolf	Scotiabank Saddledome	19,289	16–18–4	36
39	December 29	Boston	1–2	Calgary	OT	Wolf	Scotiabank Saddledome	17,536	17–18–4	38
40	December 31	Philadelphia	1–5	Calgary		Wolf	Scotiabank Saddledome	18,739	18–18–4	40

January: 4–8–2 (Home: 2–4–2; Road: 2–4–0)
#	Date	Visitor	Score	Home	OT	Decision	Venue	Attendance	Record	Points	Recap
41	January 3	Nashville	4–3	Calgary		Wolf	Scotiabank Saddledome	17,137	18–19–4	40
42	January 5	Seattle	5–1	Calgary		Wolf	Scotiabank Saddledome	16,510	18–20–4	40
43	January 7	Calgary	1–4	Montreal		Wolf	Bell Centre	20,962	18–21–4	40
44	January 8	Calgary	1–4	Boston		Wolf	TD Garden	17,850	18–22–4	40
45	January 10	Calgary	2–1	Pittsburgh		Cooley	PPG Paints Arena	18,322	19–22–4	42
46	January 13	Calgary	3–5	Columbus		Wolf	Nationwide Arena	13,385	19–23–4	42
47	January 15	Calgary	3–1	Chicago		Cooley	United Center	16,652	20–23–4	44
48	January 17	NY Islanders	2–4	Calgary		Wolf	Scotiabank Saddledome	17,358	21–23–4	46
49	January 19	New Jersey	2–1	Calgary	OT	Cooley	Scotiabank Saddledome	16,435	21–23–5	47
50	January 21	Pittsburgh	4–1	Calgary		Wolf	Scotiabank Saddledome	17,997	21–24–5	47
51	January 23	Washington	3–1	Calgary		Cooley	Scotiabank Saddledome	17,379	21–25–5	47
52	January 25	Anaheim	4–3	Calgary	OT	Wolf	Scotiabank Saddledome	16,444	21–25–6	48
53	January 29	Calgary	1–4	Minnesota		Cooley	Grand Casino Arena	17,278	21–26–6	48
54	January 31	San Jose	2–3	Calgary		Wolf	Scotiabank Saddledome	18,490	22–26–6	50

February: 2–2–0 (Home: 1–1–0; Road: 1–1–0)
#	Date	Visitor	Score	Home	OT	Decision	Venue	Attendance	Record	Points	Recap
55	February 2	Toronto	4–2	Calgary		Wolf	Scotiabank Saddledome	19,289	22–27–6	50
56	February 4	Edmonton	3–4	Calgary		Cooley	Scotiabank Saddledome	19,289	23–27–6	52
57	February 26	Calgary	4–1	San Jose		Wolf	SAP Center	17,435	24–27–6	54
58	February 28	Calgary	0–2	Los Angeles		Wolf	Crypto.com Arena	18,145	24–28–6	54

March: 7–7–2 (Home: 6–2–1; Road: 1–5–1)
#	Date	Visitor	Score	Home	OT	Decision	Venue	Attendance	Record	Points	Recap
59	March 1	Calgary	2–3	Anaheim	SO	Cooley	Honda Center	16,214	24–28–7	55
60	March 3	Dallas	6–1	Calgary		Wolf	Scotiabank Saddledome	16,725	24–29–7	55
61	March 5	Ottawa	4–1	Calgary		Cooley	Scotiabank Saddledome	17,195	24–30–7	55
62	March 7	Carolina	4–5	Calgary		Wolf	Scotiabank Saddledome	18,302	25–30–7	57
63	March 9	Calgary	3–7	Washington		Cooley	Capital One Arena	17,724	25–31–7	57
64	March 10	Calgary	0–4	NY Rangers		Wolf	Madison Square Garden	16,669	25–32–7	57
65	March 12	Calgary	5–4	New Jersey		Wolf	Prudential Center	15,388	26–32–7	59
66	March 14	Calgary	2–3	NY Islanders		Cooley	UBS Arena	17,255	26–33–7	59
67	March 16	Calgary	2–5	Detroit		Wolf	Little Caesars Arena	19,515	26–34–7	59
68	March 18	St. Louis	1–2	Calgary	SO	Cooley	Scotiabank Saddledome	16,898	27–34–7	61
69	March 20	Florida	1–4	Calgary		Wolf	Scotiabank Saddledome	18,272	28–34–7	63
70	March 22	Tampa Bay	3–4	Calgary	OT	Cooley	Scotiabank Saddledome	17,287	29–34–7	65
71	March 24	Los Angeles	2–3	Calgary	SO	Wolf	Scotiabank Saddledome	16,665	30–34–7	67
72	March 26	Anaheim	3–2	Calgary	OT	Cooley	Scotiabank Saddledome	17,047	30–34–8	68
73	March 28	Vancouver	3–7	Calgary		Wolf	Scotiabank Saddledome	18,780	31–34–8	70
74	March 30	Calgary	2–9	Colorado		Wolf	Ball Arena	18,097	31–35–8	70

April: 3–4–1 (Home: 2–1–0; Road: 1–3–1)
#	Date	Visitor	Score	Home	OT	Decision	Venue	Attendance	Record	Points	Recap
75	April 2	Calgary	3–6	Vegas		Wolf	T-Mobile Arena	17,912	31–36–8	70
76	April 4	Calgary	5–3	Anaheim		Cooley	Honda Center	14,104	32–36–8	72
77	April 7	Calgary	3–4	Dallas	OT	Cooley	American Airlines Center	18,532	32–36–9	73
78	April 9	Calgary	1–3	Colorado		Wolf	Ball Arena	18,146	32–37–9	73
79	April 11	Calgary	1–4	Seattle		Cooley	Climate Pledge Arena	17,151	32–38–9	73
80	April 12	Utah	1–4	Calgary		Wolf	Scotiabank Saddledome	17,575	33–38–9	75
81	April 14	Colorado	3–1	Calgary		Wolf	Scotiabank Saddledome	17,650	33–39–9	75
82	April 16	Los Angeles	1–3	Calgary		Sergeev	Scotiabank Saddledome	18,711	34–39–9	77

Legend: Win (2 points) Loss (0 points) Overtime/shootout loss (1 point)

== Player statistics ==
As of April 16, 2026

=== Skaters ===
Regular season
Player	GP	G	A	Pts	+/−	PIM
Matt Coronato	80	18	27	45	−29	32
Morgan Frost	82	22	21	43	−16	28
Mikael Backlund	82	17	26	43	+7	16
Nazem Kadri^{‡}	61	12	29	41	−27	24
Joel Farabee	82	20	18	38	−9	28
Blake Coleman	69	20	15	35	+12	49
Rasmus Andersson^{‡}	48	10	20	30	+3	53
Yegor Sharangovich	78	15	14	29	−20	12
Connor Zary	74	12	13	25	−9	22
Jonathan Huberdeau	50	10	15	25	−9	41
MacKenzie Weegar^{‡}	60	3	18	21	−35	69
Matvei Gridin	37	6	14	20	−14	2
Adam Klapka	79	6	12	18	−12	112
Kevin Bahl	76	4	14	18	+2	47
Olli Maatta^{†}	21	2	12	14	−1	2
Ryan Strome^{†}	19	5	7	12	−3	8
Yan Kuznetsov	57	4	8	12	−8	28
Zach Whitecloud^{†}	31	0	10	10	+2	10
Ryan Lomberg	57	4	5	9	−4	59
Zayne Parekh	37	4	5	9	−9	8
Hunter Brzustewicz	34	2	5	7	0	4
Brayden Pachal	39	1	6	7	−1	47
Joel Hanley	68	0	7	7	−5	44
Victor Olofsson^{†}	18	2	4	6	−1	0
John Beecher^{†}	29	2	4	6	−5	31
Samuel Honzek	18	2	2	4	+1	2
Martin Pospisil	22	1	2	3	−4	17
Justin Kirkland	20	1	1	2	+1	2
Jake Bean	16	1	1	2	−7	16
Brennan Othmann^{†}	2	1	1	2	−4	0
Tyson Gross	6	1	0	1	−2	2
Aydar Suniev	6	0	1	1	0	2
Dryden Hunt	3	0	0	0	−3	2
Rory Kerins	4	0	0	0	−1	2
Daniil Miromanov	1	0	0	0	0	0
William Stromgren	3	0	0	0	−1	0
Abram Wiebe	4	0	0	0	0	2
Sam Morton	3	0	0	0	−1	10

=== Goaltenders ===
Regular season
Player	GP	GS	TOI	W	L	OT	GA	GAA	SA	SV%	SO	G	A	PIM
Dustin Wolf	57	55	3149:14	23	29	3	158	3.01	1558	.899	2	0	0	4
Devin Cooley	31	26	1718:00	10	10	6	77	2.69	847	.909	0	0	1	2
Arsenii Sergeev	1	1	60:00	1	0	0	1	1.00	28	.964	0	0	0	0

^{†}Denotes player spent time with another team before joining the Flames. Stats reflect time with the Flames only.
^{‡}Denotes player was traded mid-season. Stats reflect time with the Flames only.
Bold/italics denotes franchise record.

== Transactions ==
The Flames have been involved in the following transactions during the 2025–26 season.

=== Key ===
† Contract is entry-level.
‡ Contract initially takes effect in the 2026–27 season.

=== Trades ===
Date	Details		Ref
June 28, 2025	To Detroit Red Wings 7th-round pick in 2026	To Calgary Flames STL 7th-round pick in 2025 (#211 overall)	
January 18, 2026	To Vegas Golden Knights Rasmus Andersson	To Calgary Flames Zach Whitecloud; Abram Wiebe conditional 1st-round pick in 2027 conditional 2nd-round pick in 2028	
February 2, 2026	To Dallas Stars Jeremie Poirier	To Calgary Flames Gavin White	
March 4, 2026	To Utah Mammoth MacKenzie Weegar	To Calgary Flames Jonathan Castagna; Olli Maatta; NYR 2nd-round pick in 2026; OTT 2nd-round pick in 2026; 2nd-round pick in 2026	
March 6, 2026	To New York Rangers Jacob Battaglia	To Calgary Flames Brennan Othmann	
March 6, 2026	To Colorado Avalanche Nazem Kadri* (Note: Calgary retained 20% of Kadri's contract.); 4th-round pick in 2027	To Calgary Flames Max Curran; Victor Olofsson conditional (Note: Conditions unknown.) 2nd-round pick in 2027 conditional (Note: Conditions unknown.) 1st-round pick in 2028	
March 6, 2026	To Anaheim Ducks 7th-round pick in 2027	To Calgary Flames Ryan Strome	
June 23, 2026	To New Jersey Devils Etienne Morin conditional (Note: New Jersey will receive Vegas' first-round pick in 2027 if the pick is outside of the top ten selections. Otherwise, New Jersey will receive a first-round pick in 2028.) VGK 1st-round pick in 2027 or VGK 1st-round pick in 2028 conditional (Note: New Jersey will receive Colorado's first-round pick in 2028 if the pick is outside of the top ten selections and has not already been conveyed to the Toronto Maple Leafs. Otherwise, New Jersey will receive a first-round pick in 2029.) COL 1st-round pick in 2028 or COL 1st-round pick in 2029; NYR 2nd-round pick in 2026	To Calgary Flames Simon Nemec; Maxim Tsyplakov	

=== Players acquired ===
Date	Player	Former team	Term	Via	Ref
July 1, 2025	Nick Cicek	Adler Mannheim (DEL)	1-year	Free agency	
July 1, 2025	Ivan Prosvetov	CSKA Moscow (KHL)	1-year	Free agency	
November 18, 2025	John Beecher	Boston Bruins	1-year	Waivers	
March 12, 2026	Tyson Gross	St. Cloud State (NCHC)	2-year†	Free agency	

=== Players lost ===
Date	Player	New team	Term	Via	Ref
July 1, 2025	Jonathan Aspirot	Boston Bruins	1-year	Free agency	
July 1, 2025	Daniel Vladar	Philadelphia Flyers	2-year	Free agency	
July 2, 2025	Martin Frk	Calgary Wranglers (AHL)	2-year	Free agency	
July 2, 2025	Anthony Mantha	Pittsburgh Penguins	1-year	Free agency	
July 16, 2025	Joni Jurmo			Contract termination	
August 24, 2025	Tyson Barrie			Retired	
September 3, 2025	Connor Murphy	Calgary Wranglers (AHL)	1-year	Free agency	
October 3, 2025	Ilya Solovyov	Colorado Avalanche		Waivers	
October 6, 2025	Kevin Rooney	Utah Mammoth	1-year	Free agency	

=== Signings ===
Date	Player	Term	Ref
June 28, 2025	Kevin Bahl	6-year	
June 30, 2025	Clark Bishop	1-year	
July 1, 2025	Joel Hanley	2-year	
July 2, 2025	Morgan Frost	2-year	
July 9, 2025	Sam Morton	1-year	
July 17, 2025	Rory Kerins	1-year	
July 17, 2025	Yan Kuznetsov	2-year	
July 17, 2025	Jeremie Poirier	1-year	
July 30, 2025	Martin Pospisil	3-year	
September 6, 2025	Connor Zary	3-year	
September 9, 2025	Dustin Wolf	7-year‡	
September 17, 2025	Mikael Backlund	2-year‡	
December 30, 2025	Devin Cooley	2-year‡	
March 30, 2026	Jonathan Castagna	3-year†‡	
April 1, 2026	Axel Hurtig	3-year†	
April 10, 2026	Abram Wiebe	2-year†	
May 4, 2026	Theo Stockselius	3-year†‡	
May 22, 2026	Kirill Zarubin	3-year†‡	
June 25, 2026	Rory Kerins	1-year‡	
June 25, 2026	Sam Morton	1-year‡	

== Draft picks ==
Below are the Calgary Flames selections at the 2025 NHL entry draft, which was held on June 27 and 28, 2025, at Peacock Theater in Los Angeles, California.

Round	#	Player	Pos	Nationality	College/Junior/Club team (League)
1	18 (Note: The New Jersey Devils' first-round pick went to the Calgary Flames as the result of a trade on June 19, 2024, that sent Jacob Markstrom to New Jersey in exchange for Kevin Bahl and this pick (being conditional at the time of the trade). The condition – Calgary will receive a first-round pick in 2025 if New Jersey's first-round pick in 2025 is outside of the top ten selections – was converted when the Devils qualified for the 2025 Stanley Cup playoffs on April 9, 2025.)	Cole Reschny	C	Canada	Victoria Royals (WHL)
1	32 (Note: The Florida Panthers' first-round pick went to the Calgary Flames as the result of a trade on July 22, 2022, that sent Matthew Tkachuk and a conditional fourth-round pick in 2025 to Florida in exchange for Jonathan Huberdeau, Cole Schwindt, MacKenzie Weegar and this pick (being conditional at the time of the trade). The condition – Calgary will receive a first-round pick in 2025 if Florida's first-round pick in 2025 is outside of the top ten selections – was converted when the Panthers qualified for the 2025 Stanley Cup playoffs on April 5, 2025.)	Cullen Potter	C	United States	Arizona State Sun Devils (NCHC)
2	54 (Note: The Colorado Avalanche's second-round pick went to the Calgary Flames as the result of a trade on June 27, 2024, that sent Andrew Mangiapane to Washington in exchange for this pick.)	Theo Stockselius	C	Sweden	Djurgårdens IF J20 (J20 Nationell)
3	80	Mace'o Phillips	D	United States	U.S. NTDP (USHL)
5	144	Ethan Wyttenbach	LW	United States	Sioux Falls Stampede (USHL)
6	176	Aidan Lane	RW	Canada	St. Andrew's Saints (CISAA)
7	208	Jakob Leander	D	Sweden	HV71 J20 (J20 Nationell)
7	211 (Note: The St. Louis Blues' seventh-round pick went to the Calgary Flames as the result of a trade on June 28, 2025, that sent a seventh-round pick in 2026 to Detroit in exchange for this pick. Detroit previously acquired this pick as the result of a trade on March 3, 2023, that sent Jakub Vrana to St. Louis in exchange for Dylan McLaughlin and this pick.)	Yan Matveiko	LW	Russia	Krasnaya Armiya Moskva (MHL)
