= 2025–26 Seattle Kraken season =

National Hockey League season

2025–26 Seattle Kraken
- Division: 6th Pacific
- Conference: 13th Western
- 2025–26 record: 34–37–11
- Home record: 19–17–5
- Road record: 15–20–6
- Goals for: 226
- Goals against: 263

Team information
- General manager: Jason Botterill
- Coach: Lane Lambert
- Captain: Jordan Eberle
- Alternate captains: Matty Beniers; Adam Larsson; Jaden Schwartz
- Arena: Climate Pledge Arena
- Minor league affiliates: Coachella Valley Firebirds (AHL); Kansas City Mavericks (ECHL)

Team leaders
- Goals: Jordan Eberle (26)
- Assists: Chandler Stephenson (33)
- Points: Jordan Eberle (55)
- Penalty minutes: Ryan Lindgren (60)
- Plus/minus: Kaapo Kakko (+14)
- Wins: Joey Daccord (20)
- Goals against average: Victor Ostman (2.10)

The 2025–26 Seattle Kraken season was the fifth season for the National Hockey League (NHL) franchise. They played their home games at Climate Pledge Arena.

== Off-season ==
This was the first season of Lane Lambert being the Kraken's head coach, as he replaced Dan Bylsma at the position on May 29, 2025.

== Regular season ==
Although generally not being considered a serious Stanley Cup contender by several media commentators and fans, the Kraken flirted with playoff contention for parts of the season. On March 6, 2026 (the day of the NHL trade deadline), the Kraken were in the final playoff spot in the western conference and traded for Bobby McMann from the Toronto Maple Leafs to help the team make the playoffs, giving up a second-round pick in the 2026 NHL Draft and a fourth-round pick in the 2027 NHL entry draft. Despite the acquisition and strong play from McMann, the team collapsed in their final few months of the season, winning seven of their final 23 games to miss the playoffs and finish sixth-last in the NHL.

On April 11, 2026, the Kraken were officially eliminated from playoff contention for the third consecutive season following a Los Angeles Kings 1–0 win against the Edmonton Oilers.

== Standings ==
=== Divisional standings ===
Pacific Division
Pos	Team	GP	W	L	OTL	RW	GF	GA	GD	Pts
1	y – Vegas Golden Knights	82	39	26	17	30	265	250	+15	95
2	x – Edmonton Oilers	82	41	30	11	32	282	269	+13	93
3	x – Anaheim Ducks	82	43	33	6	26	273	288	−15	92
4	x – Los Angeles Kings	82	35	27	20	22	225	247	−22	90
5	San Jose Sharks	82	39	35	8	27	251	292	−41	86
6	Seattle Kraken	82	34	37	11	26	226	263	−37	79
7	Calgary Flames	82	34	39	9	27	212	259	−47	77
8	Vancouver Canucks	82	25	49	8	15	216	316	−100	58

Source: National Hockey League
Rules for classification: 1) Fewer number of games played (GP, only during regular season); 2) Greater number of regulation wins (RW); 3) Greater number of wins in regulation and overtime, excluding shootout wins (ROW); 4) Greater number of total wins, including shootouts (W); 5) Greater number of points earned in head-to-head play; if teams played an uneven number of head-to-head games, the result of the first game on the home ice of the team with the extra home game is discarded; 6) Greater goal differential (GD); 7) Greater number of goals scored (GF)
x – Clinched playoff spot; y – Clinched division

=== Conference standings ===
Western Conference Wild Card
Pos	Div	Team	GP	W	L	OTL	RW	GF	GA	GD	Pts
1	CE	x – Utah Mammoth	82	43	33	6	33	268	240	+28	92
2	PA	x – Los Angeles Kings	82	35	27	20	22	225	247	−22	90
3	CE	St. Louis Blues	82	37	33	12	33	231	258	−27	86
4	CE	Nashville Predators	82	38	34	10	28	247	269	−22	86
5	PA	San Jose Sharks	82	39	35	8	27	251	292	−41	86
6	CE	Winnipeg Jets	82	35	35	12	28	231	260	−29	82
7	PA	Seattle Kraken	82	34	37	11	26	226	263	−37	79
8	PA	Calgary Flames	82	34	39	9	27	212	259	−47	77
9	CE	Chicago Blackhawks	82	29	39	14	22	213	275	−62	72
10	PA	Vancouver Canucks	82	25	49	8	15	216	316	−100	58

Source: National Hockey League
Rules for classification: 1) Fewer number of games played (GP, only during regular season); 2) Greater number of regulation wins (RW); 3) Greater number of wins in regulation and overtime, excluding shootout wins (ROW); 4) Greater number of total wins, including shootouts (W); 5) Greater number of points earned in head-to-head play; if teams played an uneven number of head-to-head games, the result of the first game on the home ice of the team with the extra home game is discarded; 6) Greater goal differential (GD); 7) Greater number of goals scored (GF)
x – Clinched playoff spot

== Schedule and results ==
=== Preseason ===
The Seattle Kraken's preseason schedule was released on June 30, 2025.

Seattle Kraken preseason game log featuring all six Kraken games played during the 2025–26 NHL preseason
2025 preseason game log: 3–2–1 (home: 2–0–1; road: 1–2–0)
#	Date	Visitor	Score	Home	OT	Decision	Attendance	Record	Recap
1	September 21	Vancouver	3–5	Seattle		Daccord	17,151	1–0–0
2	September 23	Seattle	1–4	Calgary		Grubauer	15,088	1–1–0
3	September 24	Seattle	4–1	Edmonton		Kokko	15,948	2–1–0
4	September 26	Seattle	2–4	Vancouver		Murray	18,409	2–2–0
5	September 29	Calgary	2–1	Seattle	SO	Grubauer	17,151	2–2–1
6	October 1	Edmonton	2–4	Seattle		Daccord	17,151	3–2–1

=== Regular season ===
Seattle Kraken regular season game log featuring all 82 Kraken games played during the 2025–26 NHL regular season
2025–26 regular season game log: 34–37–11 (home: 19–17–5; road: 15–20–6)

October: 5–2–3 (home: 3–0–1; road: 2–2–2)
#	Date	Visitor	Score	Home	OT	Decision	Location	Attendance	Record	Pts	Recap
1	October 9	Anaheim	1–3	Seattle		Daccord	Climate Pledge Arena	17,151	1–0–0	2
2	October 11	Vegas	1–2	Seattle	OT	Daccord	Climate Pledge Arena	17,151	2–0–0	4
3	October 14	Seattle	4–5	Montreal	OT	Daccord	Bell Centre	20,962	2–0–1	5
4	October 16	Seattle	3–4	Ottawa	SO	Grubauer	Canadian Tire Centre	15,736	2–0–2	6
5	October 18	Seattle	4–3	Toronto	OT	Daccord	Scotiabank Arena	18,589	3–0–2	8
6	October 20	Seattle	2–5	Philadelphia		Daccord	Xfinity Mobile Arena	16,099	3–1–2	8
7	October 21	Seattle	1–4	Washington		Murray	Capital One Arena	16,578	3–2–2	8
8	October 23	Seattle	3–0	Winnipeg		Daccord	Canada Life Centre	13,690	4–2–2	10
9	October 25	Edmonton	2–3	Seattle		Daccord	Climate Pledge Arena	17,151	5–2–2	12
10	October 28	Montreal	4–3	Seattle	OT	Daccord	Climate Pledge Arena	17,151	5–2–3	13

November: 6–5–3 (home: 3–3–2; road: 3–2–1)
#	Date	Visitor	Score	Home	OT	Decision	Location	Attendance	Record	Pts	Recap
11	November 1	NY Rangers	3–2	Seattle	OT	Daccord	Climate Pledge Arena	17,151	5–2–4	14
12	November 3	Chicago	1–3	Seattle		Daccord	Climate Pledge Arena	17,151	6–2–4	16
13	November 5	San Jose	6–1	Seattle		Daccord	Climate Pledge Arena	17,151	6–3–4	16
14	November 8	Seattle	4–3	St. Louis	OT	Grubauer	Enterprise Center	18,096	7–3–4	18
15	November 9	Seattle	1–2	Dallas		Murray	American Airlines Center	18,532	7–4–4	18
16	November 11	Columbus	2–1	Seattle	SO	Murray	Climate Pledge Arena	17,151	7–4–5	19
17	November 13	Winnipeg	3–5	Seattle		Grubauer	Climate Pledge Arena	17,151	8–4–5	21
18	November 15	San Jose	1–4	Seattle		Grubauer	Climate Pledge Arena	17,151	9–4–5	23
19	November 18	Seattle	2–4	Detroit		Daccord	Little Caesars Arena	19,515	9–5–5	23
20	November 20	Seattle	3–2	Chicago		Daccord	United Center	18,170	10–5–5	25
21	November 22	Seattle	3–2	Pittsburgh	OT	Grubauer	PPG Paints Arena	17,783	11–5–5	27
22	November 23	Seattle	0–1	NY Islanders	SO	Daccord	UBS Arena	17,255	11–5–6	28
23	November 26	Dallas	3–2	Seattle		Daccord	Climate Pledge Arena	17,151	11–6–6	28
24	November 29	Edmonton	4–0	Seattle		Daccord	Climate Pledge Arena	17,151	11–7–6	28

December: 5–7–1 (home: 2–4–1; road: 3–3–0)
#	Date	Visitor	Score	Home	OT	Decision	Location	Attendance	Record	Pts	Recap
25	December 4	Seattle	4–9	Edmonton		Daccord	Rogers Place	17,496	11–8–6	28
26	December 6	Detroit	4–3	Seattle		Daccord	Climate Pledge Arena	17,151	11–9–6	28
27	December 8	Minnesota	4–1	Seattle		Grubauer	Climate Pledge Arena	17,151	11–10–6	28
28	December 10	Los Angeles	2–3	Seattle	OT	Daccord	Climate Pledge Arena	17,151	12–10–6	30
29	December 12	Seattle	3–5	Utah		Grubauer	Delta Center	12,478	12–11–6	30
30	December 14	Buffalo	3–1	Seattle		Daccord	Climate Pledge Arena	17,151	12–12–6	30
31	December 16	Colorado	5–3	Seattle		Grubauer	Climate Pledge Arena	17,151	12–13–6	30
32	December 18	Seattle	2–4	Calgary		Daccord	Scotiabank Saddledome	17,449	12–14–6	30
33	December 20	Seattle	4–2	San Jose		Daccord	SAP Center	17,435	13–14–6	32
34	December 22	Seattle	3–1	Anaheim		Grubauer	Honda Center	16,214	14–14–6	34
35	December 23	Seattle	3–2	Los Angeles		Daccord	Crypto.com Arena	18,143	15–14–6	36
36	December 28	Philadelphia	1–4	Seattle		Grubauer	Climate Pledge Arena	17,151	16–14–6	38
37	December 29	Vancouver	3–2	Seattle	SO	Daccord	Climate Pledge Arena	17,151	16–14–7	39

January: 10–5–2 (home: 6–2–1; road: 4–3–1)
#	Date	Visitor	Score	Home	OT	Decision	Location	Attendance	Record	Pts	Recap
38	January 1	Nashville	1–4	Seattle		Grubauer	Climate Pledge Arena	17,151	17–14–7	41
39	January 2	Seattle	4–3	Vancouver	SO	Daccord	Rogers Arena	18,724	18–14–7	43
40	January 5	Seattle	5–1	Calgary		Grubauer	Scotiabank Saddledome	16,510	19–14–7	45
41	January 6	Boston	4–7	Seattle		Daccord	Climate Pledge Arena	17,151	20–14–7	47
42	January 8	Minnesota	3–2	Seattle	OT	Grubauer	Climate Pledge Arena	17,151	20–14–8	48
43	January 10	Seattle	2–3	Carolina		Daccord	Lenovo Center	18,310	20–15–8	48
44	January 12	Seattle	4–2	NY Rangers		Grubauer	Madison Square Garden	18,006	21–15–8	50
45	January 14	Seattle	2–3	New Jersey	OT	Grubauer	Prudential Center	16,027	21–15–9	51
46	January 15	Seattle	2–4	Boston		Daccord	TD Garden	17,850	21–16–9	51
47	January 17	Seattle	3–6	Utah		Grubauer	Delta Center	12,478	21–17–9	51
48	January 19	Pittsburgh	6–3	Seattle		Daccord	Climate Pledge Arena	17,151	21–18–9	51
49	January 21	NY Islanders	1–4	Seattle		Grubauer	Climate Pledge Arena	17,151	22–18–9	53
50	January 23	Anaheim	4–2	Seattle		Grubauer	Climate Pledge Arena	17,151	22–19–9	53
51	January 25	New Jersey	2–4	Seattle		Daccord	Climate Pledge Arena	17,151	23–19–9	55
52	January 27	Washington	1–5	Seattle		Grubauer	Climate Pledge Arena	17,151	24–19–9	57
53	January 29	Toronto	2–5	Seattle		Daccord	Climate Pledge Arena	17,151	25–19–9	59
54	January 31	Seattle	3–2	Vegas		Daccord	T-Mobile Arena	18,141	26–19–9	61

February: 2–3–0 (home: 1–0–0; road: 1–3–0)
#	Date	Visitor	Score	Home	OT	Decision	Location	Attendance	Record	Pts	Recap
55	February 3	Seattle	2–4	Anaheim		Grubauer	Honda Center	16,214	26–20–9	61
56	February 4	Seattle	4–2	Los Angeles		Daccord	Crypto.com Arena	18,145	27–20–9	63
57	February 25	Seattle	1–4	Dallas		Daccord	American Airlines Center	18,532	27–21–9	63
58	February 26	Seattle	1–5	St. Louis		Grubauer	Enterprise Center	18,096	27–22–9	63
59	February 28	Vancouver	1–5	Seattle		Daccord	Climate Pledge Arena	17,151	28–22–9	65

March: 4–8–2 (home: 2–5–0; road: 2–3–2)
#	Date	Visitor	Score	Home	OT	Decision	Location	Attendance	Record	Pts	Recap
60	March 2	Carolina	1–2	Seattle		Daccord	Climate Pledge Arena	17,151	29–22–9	67
61	March 4	St. Louis	3–2	Seattle		Grubauer	Climate Pledge Arena	17,151	29–23–9	67
62	March 7	Ottawa	7–4	Seattle		Daccord	Climate Pledge Arena	17,151	29–24–9	67
63	March 10	Nashville	4–2	Seattle		Daccord	Climate Pledge Arena	17,151	29–25–9	67
64	March 12	Colorado	5–1	Seattle		Daccord	Climate Pledge Arena	17,151	29–26–9	67
65	March 14	Seattle	5–2	Vancouver		Grubauer	Rogers Arena	18,611	30–26–9	69
66	March 15	Florida	2–6	Seattle		Daccord	Climate Pledge Arena	17,151	31–26–9	71
67	March 17	Tampa Bay	6–2	Seattle		Grubauer	Climate Pledge Arena	17,151	31–27–9	71
68	March 19	Seattle	1–3	Nashville		Daccord	Bridgestone Arena	17,159	31–28–9	71
69	March 21	Seattle	2–5	Columbus		Daccord	Nationwide Arena	18,864	31–29–9	71
70	March 24	Seattle	4–5	Florida	SO	Daccord	Amerant Bank Arena	19,043	31–29–10	72
71	March 26	Seattle	4–3	Tampa Bay	OT	Grubauer	Benchmark International Arena	19,092	32–29–10	74
72	March 28	Seattle	2–3	Buffalo	SO	Grubauer	KeyBank Center	19,070	32–29–11	75
73	March 31	Seattle	0–3	Edmonton		Grubauer	Rogers Place	18,347	32–30–11	75

April: 2–7–0 (home: 2–3–0; road: 0–4–0)
#	Date	Visitor	Score	Home	OT	Decision	Location	Attendance	Record	Pts	Recap
74	April 2	Utah	6–2	Seattle		Daccord	Climate Pledge Arena	17,151	32–31–11	75
75	April 4	Chicago	4–2	Seattle		Grubauer	Climate Pledge Arena	17,151	32–32–11	75
76	April 6	Seattle	2–6	Winnipeg		Grubauer	Canada Life Centre	14,430	32–33–11	75
77	April 7	Seattle	2–5	Minnesota		Daccord	Grand Casino Arena	19,089	32–34–11	75
78	April 9	Vegas	3–4	Seattle	SO	Daccord	Climate Pledge Arena	17,151	33–34–11	77
79	April 11	Calgary	1–4	Seattle		Kokko	Climate Pledge Arena	17,151	34–34–11	79
80	April 13	Los Angeles	5–3	Seattle		Kokko	Climate Pledge Arena	17,151	34–35–11	79
81	April 15	Seattle	1–4	Vegas		Kokko	T-Mobile Arena	18,090	34–36–11	79
82	April 16	Seattle	0–2	Colorado		Ostman	Ball Arena	18,155	34–37–11	79

Legend: Win (2 points) Loss (0 points) OT/SO loss (1 point)

== Player statistics ==
(as of April 16, 2026)

=== Skaters ===
Regular season
Player	GP	G	A	Pts	+/−	PIM
Jordan Eberle	80	26	29	55	+2	28
Matty Beniers	82	20	30	50	–8	23
Chandler Stephenson	80	16	33	49	–24	14
Vince Dunn	81	11	33	44	–24	54
Jared McCann	52	20	20	40	–7	11
Kaapo Kakko	65	13	27	40	+14	14
Eeli Tolvanen	78	12	24	36	–18	30
Brandon Montour	64	11	21	32	–21	45
Shane Wright	74	12	15	27	+6	10
Jaden Schwartz	50	11	15	26	+5	8
Adam Larsson	82	7	18	25	0	42
Frederick Gaudreau	68	7	17	24	−1	11
Ryan Winterton	68	4	14	18	0	15
Ryker Evans	67	8	9	17	+5	40
Berkly Catton	66	7	10	17	−8	31
Ben Meyers	52	7	8	15	−12	16
Jamie Oleksiak	78	5	10	15	+9	36
Bobby McMann^{†}	18	10	4	14	0	2
Mason Marchment^{‡}	29	4	9	13	−4	26
Ryan Lindgren	76	2	7	9	−2	60
Tye Kartye^{‡}	40	3	5	8	−6	21
Jani Nyman	28	4	3	7	−5	6
Jacob Melanson	36	2	3	5	−9	32
Josh Mahura	23	1	2	3	+8	16
Cale Fleury	23	1	2	3	+1	7
Oscar Fisker Molgaard	13	0	2	2	+2	2
John Hayden	3	0	0	0	−1	2

=== Goaltenders ===
Regular season
Player	GP	GS	TOI	W	L	OT	GA	GAA	SA	SV%	SO	G	A	PIM
Joey Daccord	47	46	2693:13	20	20	6	136	3.03	1307	.897	2	0	3	4
Philipp Grubauer	32	28	1791:06	13	12	4	79	2.65	866	.909	0	0	2	0
Nikke Kokko	3	3	177:41	1	2	0	9	3.04	82	.890	0	0	0	0
Victor Östman	1	1	57:10	0	1	0	2	2.10	35	.943	0	0	0	0
Matt Murray	5	4	216:53	0	2	1	8	2.21	102	.922	0	0	0	0

^{†}Denotes player spent time with another team before joining the Kraken. Stats reflect time with the Kraken only.
^{‡}Denotes player left team mid-season. Stats reflect time with the Kraken only.

== Transactions ==
The Kraken have been involved in the following transactions during the 2025–26 season.

Italics indicate contract is entry-level.

=== Trades ===
Date	Details		Ref
June 28, 2025	To Philadelphia Flyers 2nd-round pick in 2025; TOR 2nd-round pick in 2025	To Seattle Kraken 2nd-round pick in 2025; 3rd-round pick in 2025	
June 28, 2025	To Columbus Blue Jackets 7th-round pick in 2025	To Seattle Kraken 7th-round pick in 2025; VGK 7th-round pick in 2025	
September 4, 2025	To Philadelphia Flyers Tucker Robertson	To Seattle Kraken Jon-Randall Avon	
December 20, 2025	To Columbus Blue Jackets Mason Marchment	To Seattle Kraken 2nd-round pick in 2027; NYR 4th-round pick in 2026	
March 6, 2026	To Toronto Maple Leafs conditional 2nd-round pick in 2027; ANA 4th-round pick in 2026	To Seattle Kraken Bobby McMann	
June 21, 2026	To Florida Panthers TBL 1st-round pick in 2026 conditional 2nd-round pick in 2027	To Seattle Kraken Mackie Samoskevich	

=== Free agents acquired ===
Date	Player	Former team	Term	Ref
July 1, 2025	Ryan Lindgren	Colorado Avalanche	4-year	
July 1, 2025	Matt Murray	Toronto Maple Leafs	1-year	
March 1, 2026	Ryden Evers	Penticton Vees (WHL)	3-year	
March 2, 2026	Gustav Olofsson	Coachella Valley Firebirds (AHL)	1-year	

=== Free agents lost ===
Date	Player	New team	Ref
July 1, 2025	Mikey Eyssimont	Boston Bruins	
July 2, 2025	Brandon Biro	AK Bars Kazan (KHL)	
July 2, 2025	Nikolas Brouillard	San Diego Gulls (AHL)	
July 15, 2025	Gustav Olofsson	Coachella Valley Firebirds (AHL)	

Lost via waivers

Date	Player	New team	Ref
February 27, 2026	Tye Kartye	New York Rangers	

=== Lost via retirement ===
Date	Player	Ref
June 10, 2026	Max McCormick	

=== Other signings ===
Date	Player	Term	Ref
July 3, 2025	Jake O'Brien	3-year	
July 5, 2025	Tye Kartye	2-year	
July 22, 2025	Kaapo Kakko	3-year	
August 11, 2025	Ryker Evans	2-year	
October 3, 2025	Julius Miettinen	3-year	
February 24, 2026	Ben Meyers	2-year	
February 24, 2026	Ryan Winterton	2-year	
March 6, 2026	Jordan Eberle	2-year	
May 19, 2026	Alexis Bernier	3-year	
June 18, 2026	Logan Morrison	1-year	
June 21, 2026	Bobby McMann	6-year	

=== Other players lost ===
Date	Player	Term	Ref
June 30, 2025	Joe Veleno	Contract buyout	

== Draft picks ==
Below are the Seattle Krakens' selections at the 2025 NHL entry draft, which was held on June 27 to 28, 2025, at the Peacock Theater in Los Angeles, California.

Round	#	Player	Pos	Nationality	College/Junior/Club (League)
1	8	Jake O'Brien	C	Canada	Brantford Bulldogs (OHL)
2	36 (Note: 1. The Philadelphia Flyers' second-round pick went to the Seattle Kraken as the result of a trade on June 28, 2025 that sent a second-round pick in 2025 (38th overall) and Toronto's second-round pick in 2025 (57th overall) to Philadelphia in exchange for a third-round pick in 2025 (68th overall) and this pick)	Blake Fiddler	D	Canada	Edmonton Oil Kings (WHL)
3	68 (Note: 1. The Philadelphia Flyers' third-round pick went to the Kraken as the result of a trade on June 28, 2025 that sent a second-round pick in 2025 (38th overall) and Toronto's second-round pick in 2025 (57th overall) to Philadelphia in exchange for a second-round pick in 2025 (38th overall) and this pick)	Will Reynolds	D	Canada	Acadie–Bathurst Titan (QMJHL)
5	134	Maxim Agafonov	D	Russia	Tolpar Ufa (MHL)
7	205 (Note: 1. The Columbus Blue Jackets' seventh-round pick went to the Kraken as the result of a trade on June 28, 2025 that sent a seventh-round pick in 2025 (198th overall) to Columbus in exchange for Vegas' seventh-round pick in 2025 (218th overall) and this pick)	Karl Annborn	D	Sweden	HV71 J20 (J20 Nationell)
7	218 (Note: 1. The Vegas Golden Knights' seventh-round pick went to the Kraken as the result of a trade on June 28, 2025 that sent a seventh-round pick in 2025 (198th overall) to Columbus in exchange for a seventh-round pick in 2025 (205th overall) and this pick)	Loke Krantz	RW	Sweden	Linköping HC J20 (J20 Nationell)
