= 2025–26 Vancouver Canucks season =

National Hockey League season

2025–26 Vancouver Canucks
- Division: 8th Pacific
- Conference: 16th Western
- 2025–26 record: 25–49–8
- Home record: 9–27–5
- Road record: 16–22–3
- Goals for: 216
- Goals against: 316

Team information
- General manager: Patrik Allvin
- Coach: Adam Foote
- Captain: Quinn Hughes (Oct. 9 – Dec. 12); Vacant (Dec. 12 – Apr. 16)
- Alternate captains: Brock Boeser; Filip Hronek (Dec. 12 – Apr. 16); Tyler Myers (Oct. 9 – Mar. 4); Elias Pettersson
- Arena: Rogers Arena
- Minor league affiliates: Abbotsford Canucks (AHL); Kalamazoo Wings (ECHL)

Team leaders
- Goals: Jake DeBrusk (23)
- Assists: Filip Hronek (41)
- Points: Elias Pettersson (51)
- Penalty minutes: Evander Kane (92)
- Plus/minus: Kirill Kudryavtsev (+2)
- Wins: Kevin Lankinen (11)
- Goals against average: Thatcher Demko (2.90)

The 2025–26 Vancouver Canucks season was the 56th season for the National Hockey League (NHL) franchise that was established on May 22, 1970.

On March 22, 2026, the Canucks became the first team to be eliminated from playoff contention, missing the playoffs for the second season in a row following victories from the Nashville Predators, Utah Mammoth, and Vegas Golden Knights.

The Canucks finished last overall in league standings for the first time since the 1971–72 season, and matched the 1998–99 season for the third worst points percentage in franchise history (.354) and the lowest number of points recorded in an 82 game season (58). The Canucks also finished the season with the worst home record in franchise history, going 9–27–5 on home ice.

Following the conclusion of the NHL regular season on April 17, 2026, the Canucks fired general manager Patrik Allvin.

== Standings ==
=== Divisional standings ===
Pacific Division
Pos	Team	GP	W	L	OTL	RW	GF	GA	GD	Pts
1	y – Vegas Golden Knights	82	39	26	17	30	265	250	+15	95
2	x – Edmonton Oilers	82	41	30	11	32	282	269	+13	93
3	x – Anaheim Ducks	82	43	33	6	26	273	288	−15	92
4	x – Los Angeles Kings	82	35	27	20	22	225	247	−22	90
5	San Jose Sharks	82	39	35	8	27	251	292	−41	86
6	Seattle Kraken	82	34	37	11	26	226	263	−37	79
7	Calgary Flames	82	34	39	9	27	212	259	−47	77
8	Vancouver Canucks	82	25	49	8	15	216	316	−100	58

Source: National Hockey League
Rules for classification: 1) Fewer number of games played (GP, only during regular season); 2) Greater number of regulation wins (RW); 3) Greater number of wins in regulation and overtime, excluding shootout wins (ROW); 4) Greater number of total wins, including shootouts (W); 5) Greater number of points earned in head-to-head play; if teams played an uneven number of head-to-head games, the result of the first game on the home ice of the team with the extra home game is discarded; 6) Greater goal differential (GD); 7) Greater number of goals scored (GF)
x – Clinched playoff spot; y – Clinched division

=== Conference standings ===
Western Conference Wild Card
Pos	Div	Team	GP	W	L	OTL	RW	GF	GA	GD	Pts
1	CE	x – Utah Mammoth	82	43	33	6	33	268	240	+28	92
2	PA	x – Los Angeles Kings	82	35	27	20	22	225	247	−22	90
3	CE	St. Louis Blues	82	37	33	12	33	231	258	−27	86
4	CE	Nashville Predators	82	38	34	10	28	247	269	−22	86
5	PA	San Jose Sharks	82	39	35	8	27	251	292	−41	86
6	CE	Winnipeg Jets	82	35	35	12	28	231	260	−29	82
7	PA	Seattle Kraken	82	34	37	11	26	226	263	−37	79
8	PA	Calgary Flames	82	34	39	9	27	212	259	−47	77
9	CE	Chicago Blackhawks	82	29	39	14	22	213	275	−62	72
10	PA	Vancouver Canucks	82	25	49	8	15	216	316	−100	58

Source: National Hockey League
Rules for classification: 1) Fewer number of games played (GP, only during regular season); 2) Greater number of regulation wins (RW); 3) Greater number of wins in regulation and overtime, excluding shootout wins (ROW); 4) Greater number of total wins, including shootouts (W); 5) Greater number of points earned in head-to-head play; if teams played an uneven number of head-to-head games, the result of the first game on the home ice of the team with the extra home game is discarded; 6) Greater goal differential (GD); 7) Greater number of goals scored (GF)
x – Clinched playoff spot

== Schedule and results ==
=== Preseason ===
The preseason schedule was released on June 30, 2025.

2025 preseason game log: 4–2–0 (home: 3–0–0; road: 1–2–0)
#	Date	Visitor	Score	Home	OT	Decision	Attendance	Record	Recap
1	September 21	Vancouver	3–5	Seattle		Young	17,151	0–1–0
2^{[a]}	September 24	Calgary	1–3	Vancouver		Demko	5,785	1–1–0
3	September 26	Seattle	2–4	Vancouver		Tolopilo	18,409	2–1–0
4	September 28	Vancouver	3–4	Edmonton		Demko	16,656	2–2–0
5	October 1	Vancouver	8–1	Calgary		Lankinen	15,804	3–2–0
6	October 3	Edmonton	2–3	Vancouver	OT	Demko	18,902	4–2–0
Notes:^{a} Game was played at Rogers Forum in Abbotsford, British Columbia.

=== Regular season ===
The regular season schedule was released on July 16, 2025.

2025–26 game log

October: 6–6–0 (Home: 2–3–0; Road: 4–3–0)
#	Date	Visitor	Score	Home	OT	Decision	Attendance	Record	Pts	Recap
1	October 9	Calgary	1–5	Vancouver		Demko	19,012	1–0–0	2
2	October 11	Vancouver	1–3	Edmonton		Demko	18,347	1–1–0	2
3	October 13	St. Louis	5–2	Vancouver		Lankinen	18,952	1–2–0	2
4	October 16	Vancouver	5–3	Dallas		Demko	18,532	2–2–0	4
5	October 17	Vancouver	3–2	Chicago	SO	Lankinen	18,306	3–2–0	6
6	October 19	Vancouver	4–3	Washington		Demko	17,018	4–2–0	8
7	October 21	Vancouver	1–5	Pittsburgh		Lankinen	13,685	4–3–0	8
8	October 23	Vancouver	1–2	Nashville		Demko	17,159	4–4–0	8
9	October 25	Montreal	4–3	Vancouver		Lankinen	18,846	4–5–0	8
10	October 26	Edmonton	3–4	Vancouver	OT	Demko	18,770	5–5–0	10
11	October 28	NY Rangers	2–0	Vancouver		Demko	18,919	5–6–0	10
12	October 30	Vancouver	4–3	St. Louis	SO	Lankinen	16,848	6–6–0	12

November: 4–7–3 (Home: 1–4–1; Road: 3–3–2)
#	Date	Visitor	Score	Home	OT	Decision	Attendance	Record	Pts	Recap
13	November 1	Vancouver	2–5	Minnesota		Demko	17,216	6–7–0	12
14	November 3	Vancouver	5–4	Nashville	OT	Demko	17,159	7–7–0	14
15	November 5	Chicago	5–2	Vancouver		Lankinen	19,002	7–8–0	14
16	November 8	Columbus	3–4	Vancouver		Lankinen	18,763	8–8–0	16
17	November 9	Colorado	5–4	Vancouver	OT	Lankinen	18,643	8–8–1	17
18	November 11	Winnipeg	5–3	Vancouver		Lankinen	18,725	8–9–1	17
19	November 14	Vancouver	3–4	Carolina	OT	Lankinen	18,299	8–9–2	18
20	November 16	Vancouver	6–2	Tampa Bay		Lankinen	19,092	9–9–2	20
21	November 17	Vancouver	5–8	Florida		Patera	19,260	9–10–2	20
22	November 20	Dallas	4–2	Vancouver		Lankinen	18,703	9–11–2	20
23	November 23	Calgary	5–2	Vancouver		Lankinen	18,671	9–12–2	20
24	November 26	Vancouver	5–4	Anaheim		Tolopilo	16,781	10–12–2	22
25	November 28	Vancouver	2–3	San Jose		Tolopilo	17,435	10–13–2	22
26	November 29	Vancouver	1–2	Los Angeles	OT	Lankinen	18,145	10–13–3	23

December: 6–7–0 (Home: 1–5–0; Road: 5–2–0)
#	Date	Visitor	Score	Home	OT	Decision	Attendance	Record	Pts	Recap
27	December 2	Vancouver	1–3	Colorado		Lankinen	18,103	10–14–3	23
28	December 5	Utah	4–1	Vancouver		Lankinen	18,732	10–15–3	23
29	December 6	Minnesota	2–4	Vancouver		Tolopilo	18,629	11–15–3	25
30	December 8	Detroit	4–0	Vancouver		Lankinen	18,707	11–16–3	25
31	December 11	Buffalo	3–2	Vancouver		Demko	18,606	11–17–3	25
32	December 14	Vancouver	2–1	New Jersey		Demko	13,821	12–17–3	27
33	December 16	Vancouver	3–0	NY Rangers		Demko	17,452	13–17–3	29
34	December 19	Vancouver	4–1	NY Islanders		Demko	17,255	14–17–3	31
35	December 20	Vancouver	5–4	Boston	SO	Lankinen	17,850	15–17–3	33
36	December 22	Vancouver	2–5	Philadelphia		Demko	19,994	15–18–3	33
37	December 27	San Jose	6–3	Vancouver		Demko	18,992	15–19–3	33
38	December 29	Vancouver	3–2	Seattle	SO	Lankinen	17,151	16–19–3	35
39	December 30	Philadelphia	6–3	Vancouver		Demko	18,853	16–20–3	35

January: 2–11–3 (Home: 2–5–3; Road: 0–6–0)
#	Date	Visitor	Score	Home	OT	Decision	Attendance	Record	Pts	Recap
40	January 2	Seattle	4–3	Vancouver	SO	Demko	18,724	16–20–4	36
41	January 3	Boston	3–2	Vancouver	OT	Lankinen	18,665	16–20–5	37
42	January 6	Vancouver	3–5	Buffalo		Demko	17,036	16–21–5	37
43	January 8	Vancouver	1–5	Detroit		Lankinen	18,425	16–22–5	37
44	January 10	Vancouver	0–5	Toronto		Demko	19,078	16–23–5	37
45	January 12	Vancouver	3–6	Montreal		Tolopilo	20,962	16–24–5	37
46	January 13	Vancouver	1–2	Ottawa		Lankinen	15,801	16–25–5	37
47	January 15	Vancouver	1–4	Columbus		Lankinen	14,918	16–26–5	37
48	January 17	Edmonton	6–0	Vancouver		Tolopilo	18,845	16–27–5	37
49	January 19	NY Islanders	4–3	Vancouver		Lankinen	18,503	16–28–5	37
50	January 21	Washington	3–4	Vancouver		Lankinen	18,556	17–28–5	39
51	January 23	New Jersey	5–4	Vancouver		Lankinen	18,603	17–29–5	39
52	January 25	Pittsburgh	3–2	Vancouver		Lankinen	18,955	17–30–5	39
53	January 27	San Jose	5–2	Vancouver		Lankinen	18,964	17–31–5	39
54	January 29	Anaheim	0–2	Vancouver		Tolopilo	18,774	18–31–5	41
55	January 31	Toronto	3–2	Vancouver	SO	Tolopilo	18,905	18–31–6	42

February: 0–3–1 (Home: 0–0–1; Road: 0–3–0)
#	Date	Visitor	Score	Home	OT	Decision	Attendance	Record	Pts	Recap
56	February 2	Vancouver	2–6	Utah		Lankinen	12,478	18–32–6	42
57	February 4	Vancouver	2–5	Vegas		Lankinen	17,622	18–33–6	42
58	February 25	Winnipeg	3–2	Vancouver	OT	Tolopilo	18,139	18–33–7	43
59	February 28	Vancouver	1–5	Seattle		Lankinen	17,151	18–34–7	43

March: 3–10–1 (Home: 2–8–0; Road: 1–2–1)
#	Date	Visitor	Score	Home	OT	Decision	Attendance	Record	Pts	Recap
60	March 2	Dallas	6–1	Vancouver		Tolopilo	18,222	18–35–7	43
61	March 4	Carolina	6–4	Vancouver		Tolopilo	18,004	18–36–7	43
62	March 6	Vancouver	6–3	Chicago		Tolopilo	20,580	19–36–7	45
63	March 7	Vancouver	2–3	Winnipeg	OT	Lankinen	14,294	19–36–8	46
64	March 9	Ottawa	2–0	Vancouver		Lankinen	18,228	19–37–8	46
65	March 12	Nashville	3–4	Vancouver	SO	Tolopilo	18,521	20–37–8	48
66	March 14	Seattle	5–2	Vancouver		Tolopilo	18,611	20–38–8	48
67	March 17	Florida	2–5	Vancouver		Lankinen	18,355	21–38–8	50
68	March 19	Tampa Bay	6–2	Vancouver		Lankinen	18,345	21–39–8	50
69	March 21	St. Louis	3–1	Vancouver		Lankinen	18,719	21–40–8	50
70	March 24	Anaheim	5–3	Vancouver		Lankinen	18,001	21–41–8	50
71	March 26	Los Angeles	4–0	Vancouver		Lankinen	18,611	21–42–8	50
72	March 28	Vancouver	3–7	Calgary		Tolopilo	18,780	21–43–8	50
73	March 30	Vancouver	2–4	Vegas		Lankinen	17,810	21–44–8	50

April: 4–5–0 (Home: 1–2–0; Road: 3–3–0)
#	Date	Visitor	Score	Home	OT	Decision	Attendance	Record	Pts	Recap
74	April 1	Vancouver	8–6	Colorado		Lankinen	18,103	22–44–8	52
75	April 2	Vancouver	2–5	Minnesota		Tolopilo	19,156	22–45–8	52
76	April 4	Utah	7–4	Vancouver		Tolopilo	18,693	22–46–8	52
77	April 7	Vegas	2–1	Vancouver		Tolopilo	18,691	22–47–8	52
78	April 9	Vancouver	1–4	Los Angeles		Tolopilo	18,145	22–48–8	52
79	April 11	Vancouver	4–3	San Jose	SO	Lankinen	17,435	23–48–8	54
80	April 12	Vancouver	4–3	Anaheim	OT	Tolopilo	16,731	24–48–8	56
81	April 14	Los Angeles	3–4	Vancouver	OT	Lankinen	18,969	25–48–8	58
82	April 16	Vancouver	1–6	Edmonton		Lankinen	18,347	25–49–8	58

Legend: Win (2 points) Loss (0 points) Overtime/shootout loss (1 point)

== Player statistics ==
=== Skaters ===
Regular season
Player	GP	G	A	Pts	+/−	PIM
Elias Pettersson	74	15	36	51	−30	20
Filip Hronek	82	8	41	49	−23	33
Brock Boeser	75	22	26	48	−48	8
Jake DeBrusk	81	23	19	42	−31	12
Linus Karlsson	79	15	20	35	−28	42
Evander Kane	71	13	18	31	−20	92
Drew O'Connor	82	17	12	29	−12	47
Conor Garland (Note: Traded mid-season. Stats reflect time with the Canucks only.)	50	7	19	26	−15	30
Kiefer Sherwood	44	17	6	23	−12	22
Quinn Hughes	26	2	21	23	−10	12
Marco Rossi (Note: Spent time with another team before joining the Canucks. Stats reflect time with the Canucks only.)	33	8	14	22	−20	8
Tom Willander	70	5	16	21	−23	28
Max Sasson	66	13	6	19	−13	26
Liam Ohgren	51	8	10	18	−16	2
Marcus Pettersson	82	3	15	18	−19	60
Teddy Blueger	35	9	8	17	−12	22
Aatu Raty	66	4	10	14	−4	22
Zeev Buium	45	3	9	12	−24	33
Elias Pettersson	70	3	7	10	−16	39
Tyler Myers	57	1	7	8	−25	40
David Kampf	38	2	4	6	−12	10
Pierre-Olivier Joseph	31	1	5	6	−16	8
Nils Hoglander	38	2	3	5	−4	8
Arshdeep Bains	28	1	4	5	−3	12
Mackenzie MacEachern	8	1	3	4	0	12
Filip Chytil	12	3	0	3	−7	6
Jonathan Lekkerimaki	13	2	1	3	−3	0
Victor Mancini	24	0	3	3	−12	7
Curtis Douglas	14	1	1	2	−4	16
Kirill Kudryavtsev	3	0	2	2	+2	0
Ty Mueller	6	1	0	1	+1	2
Lukas Reichel	14	0	1	1	−5	4
Joseph LaBate	1	0	0	0	−1	0
Derek Forbort	2	0	0	0	0	2
Nils Aman	2	0	0	0	0	0
Braeden Cootes	3	0	0	0	−2	0

=== Goaltenders ===
Regular season
Player	GP	GS	TOI	W	L	OT	GA	GAA	SA	SV%	SO	G	A	PIM
Kevin Lankinen	47	43	2,592:21	11	27	5	160	3.70	1,285	.875	0	0	2	4
Thatcher Demko	20	20	1,115:52	8	10	1	54	2.90	514	.897	1	0	1	0
Nikita Tolopilo	21	18	1,145:41	6	11	2	69	3.61	555	.881	0	0	0	2
Jiri Patera	1	1	56:49	0	1	0	7	7.39	40	.825	0	0	0	0

== Awards and honours ==
=== Milestones ===
Regular season
Player	Milestone	Reached	Ref
Braeden Cootes	1st career NHL game	October 9, 2025	
Tom Willander	1st career NHL game	October 28, 2025	
Evander Kane	1000th career NHL game	April 4th, 2026	

== Transactions ==
The Canucks have been involved in the following transactions during the 2025–26 season.

=== Trades ===
Date	Details		Ref
June 28, 2025	To Chicago Blackhawks Future Considerations	To Vancouver Canucks Ilya Safonov	
July 13, 2025	To Pittsburgh Penguins Arturs Silovs	To Vancouver Canucks Chase Stillman; 4th-round pick in 2027	
July 13, 2025	To Toronto Maple Leafs Dakota Joshua	To Vancouver Canucks 4th-round pick in 2028	
October 24, 2025	To Chicago Blackhawks 4th-round pick in 2027	To Vancouver Canucks Lukas Reichel	
December 12, 2025	To Minnesota Wild Quinn Hughes	To Vancouver Canucks Marco Rossi; Liam Ohgren; Zeev Buium; 1st-round pick in 2026	
January 19, 2026	To San Jose Sharks Kiefer Sherwood	To Vancouver Canucks Cole Clayton; 2nd-round pick in 2026; 2nd-round pick in 2027	
March 4, 2026	To Dallas Stars Tyler Myers*(50% retention)	To Vancouver Canucks 2nd-round pick in 2027; 4th-round pick in 2029	
March 5, 2026	To San Jose Sharks Jett Woo	To Vancouver Canucks Jack Thompson	
March 5, 2026	To Columbus Blue Jackets Conor Garland	To Vancouver Canucks 3rd-round pick in 2026; 2nd-round pick in 2028	
March 6, 2026	To Boston Bruins Lukas Reichel	To Vancouver Canucks 6th-round pick in 2026	
March 6, 2026	To Washington Capitals David Kämpf	To Vancouver Canucks 6th-round pick in 2026	
March 13, 2026	To Edmonton Oilers Josh Bloom	To Vancouver Canucks Jayden Grubbe	

=== Players acquired ===
Date	Player	Former team	Term	Via	Ref
July 1, 2025	Joseph LaBate	Columbus Blue Jackets	1-year	Free agency	
July 1, 2025	Mackenzie MacEachern	St. Louis Blues	2-year	Free agency	
July 1, 2025	Jimmy Schuldt	San Jose Sharks	2-year	Free agency	
July 2, 2025	Pierre-Olivier Joseph	Pittsburgh Penguins	1-year	Free agency	
November 15, 2025	David Kämpf	Toronto Maple Leafs	1-year	Free agency	
March 6, 2026	Curtis Douglas	Tampa Bay Lightning		Waivers	

=== Players lost ===
Date	Player	New team	Term	Via	Ref
July 1, 2025	Sammy Blais	Montreal Canadiens	1-year	Free agency	
July 1, 2025	Phillip Di Giuseppe	Winnipeg Jets	1-year	Free agency	
July 1, 2025	Noah Juulsen	Philadelphia Flyers	1-year	Free agency	
July 1, 2025	Cole McWard	New York Islanders	1-year	Free agency	
July 2, 2025	Pius Suter	St. Louis Blues	2-year	Free agency	
August 1, 2025	Tristen Nielsen	Colorado Eagles (AHL)	1-year	Free agency	
September 16, 2025	Christian Felton	Utah Grizzlies (ECHL)	1-year	Free agency	
November 5, 2025	Vitali Kravtsov			Contract termination	

=== Signings ===
Date	Player	Term	Ref
June 30, 2025	Arshdeep Bains	2–year	
June 30, 2025	Guillaume Brisebois	1–year	
June 30, 2025	Aatu Raty	2–year	
June 30, 2025	Max Sasson	1–year	
July 1, 2025	Brock Boeser	7–year	
July 1, 2025	Thatcher Demko	3–year (Note: Contract initially takes effect in the 2026–27 season.)	
July 1, 2025	Conor Garland	6–year	
July 8, 2025	Nikita Tolopilo	2–year	
July 8, 2025	Jett Woo	1–year	
July 9, 2025	Braeden Cootes	3–year (Note: Contract is entry-level.)	
July 10, 2025	Alexei Medvedev	3–year	
August 5, 2025	Vitali Kravtsov	1–year	
September 22, 2025	Gabriel Chiarot	3–year	
September 22, 2025	Riley Patterson	3–year	
December 15, 2025	Max Sasson	2–year	
January 2, 2026	Linus Karlsson	2–year	
March 20, 2026	Victor Mancini	2–year	
June 2, 2026	Ilya Safonov	1-year	

== Draft picks ==
Below are the Vancouver Canucks' selections at the 2025 NHL entry draft, which was held on June 27 to 28, 2025, at the Peacock Theater in Los Angeles, California.

Round	#	Player	Pos	Nationality	College/Junior/Club (League)
1	15	Braeden Cootes	C	Canada	Seattle Thunderbirds (WHL)
2	47	Alexei Medvedev	G	Russia	London Knights (OHL)
3	65 (Note: The San Jose Sharks' third-round pick went to the Vancouver Canucks as the result of a trade on March 6, 2025, that sent Carson Soucy to New York in exchange for this pick.)	Kieren Dervin	C	Canada	St. Andrew's Saints (CISAA)
5	143	Wilson Bjorck	C	Sweden	Djurgardens IF (HockeyAllsvenskan)
6	175	Gabriel Chiarot	RW	Canada	Brampton Steelheads (OHL)
7	207	Matthew Lansing	C	United States	Fargo Force (USHL)
