= List of Seattle Kraken seasons =

Lists of seasons played by the Seattle Kraken

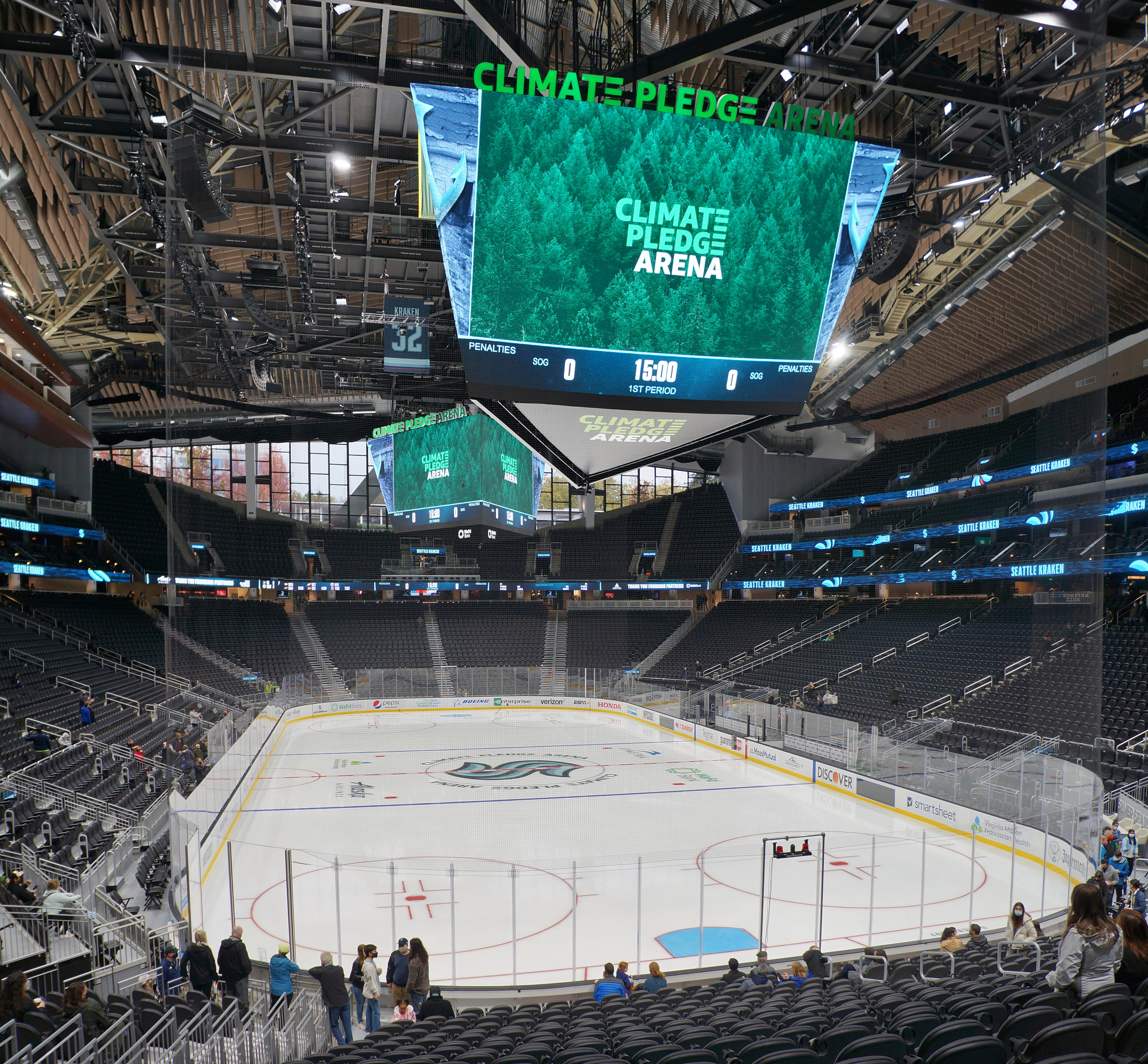
Interior view of Climate Pledge Arena, the team's home venue

The Seattle Kraken are a professional ice hockey team based in Seattle. The Kraken compete in the National Hockey League (NHL) as a member of the Pacific Division of the Western Conference. The team was founded after the NHL approved a proposal by Seattle Hockey Partners to grant an expansion franchise to the city of Seattle, and began play during the league's 2021–22 season. As of the end of the 2024–25 season, the Kraken have won 142 regular season games and appeared in the playoffs one time.

The Kraken struggled during their inaugural season and finished last in the Pacific Division with 60 points. Only the Arizona Coyotes finished with fewer points (57) in the Western Conference that season. During the 2022–23 season, the Kraken achieved a record of 46–28–8 and 100 points, which was good for fourth place in the Pacific Division and the first playoff wild card spot in the Western Conference. During the playoffs, the Kraken faced off against the Colorado Avalanche in the first round. They upset the Avalanche in seven games, becoming the first expansion team to win their inaugural playoff series against the defending Stanley Cup champion. However, they lost to the Dallas Stars in the second round, ending their sophomore season. During the 2023–24 season, the Kraken struggled offensively, scoring only 217 goals and achieving only 81 points. This caused the Kraken to fire head coach Dave Hakstol and hire Dan Bylsma. However, during the 2024–25 season, the Kraken did worse, achieving only 76 points. Following the season, the Kraken once again fired their head coach, canning Bylsma and hiring Lane Lambert. The Kraken also replaced general manager Ron Francis with Jason Botterill, making Francis the Kraken's president of hockey operations.

== Table keys ==
Key of colors and symbols
Color/symbol	Explanation
†	Stanley Cup champions
‡	Conference champions
↑	Division champions
#	Led league in points

Key of terms and abbreviations
Term or abbreviation	Definition
Finish	Final position in division or league standings
GP	Number of games played
W	Number of wins
L	Number of losses
OT	Number of losses in overtime
Pts	Number of points
GF	Goals for (goals scored by the Kraken)
GA	Goals against (goals scored by the Kraken's opponents)
—	Does not apply

== Year by year ==
List of Seattle Kraken seasons
NHL season	Kraken season	Conference	Division	Regular season								Postseason					
NHL season	Kraken season	Conference	Division	Finish	GP	W	L	OT	Pts	GF	GA	GP	W	L	GF	GA	Result
2021–22	2021–22	Western	Pacific	8th	82	27	49	6	60	216	285	—	—	—	—	—	Did not qualify
2022–23	2022–23	Western	Pacific	4th	82	46	28	8	100	289	256	14	7	7	44	45	Won in first round, 4–3 (Avalanche); Lost in second round, 3–4 (Stars)
2023–24	2023–24	Western	Pacific	6th	82	34	35	13	81	217	236	—	—	—	—	—	Did not qualify
2024–25	2024–25	Western	Pacific	7th	82	35	41	6	76	247	265	—	—	—	—	—	Did not qualify
2025–26	2025–26	Western	Pacific	6th	82	34	37	11	79	226	263	—	—	—	—	—	Did not qualify
Totals					410	176	190	44	396	1,195	1,305	14	7	7	44	45	1 playoff appearance

== All-time records ==
Statistic	GP	W	L	OT
Regular season record (2021–present)	410	176	190	44
Postseason record (2021–present)	14	7	7	—
All-time regular and postseason record	424	173	197	44
All-time series record: 1–1
