= Cole Schwindt =

Canadian ice hockey player (born 2001)

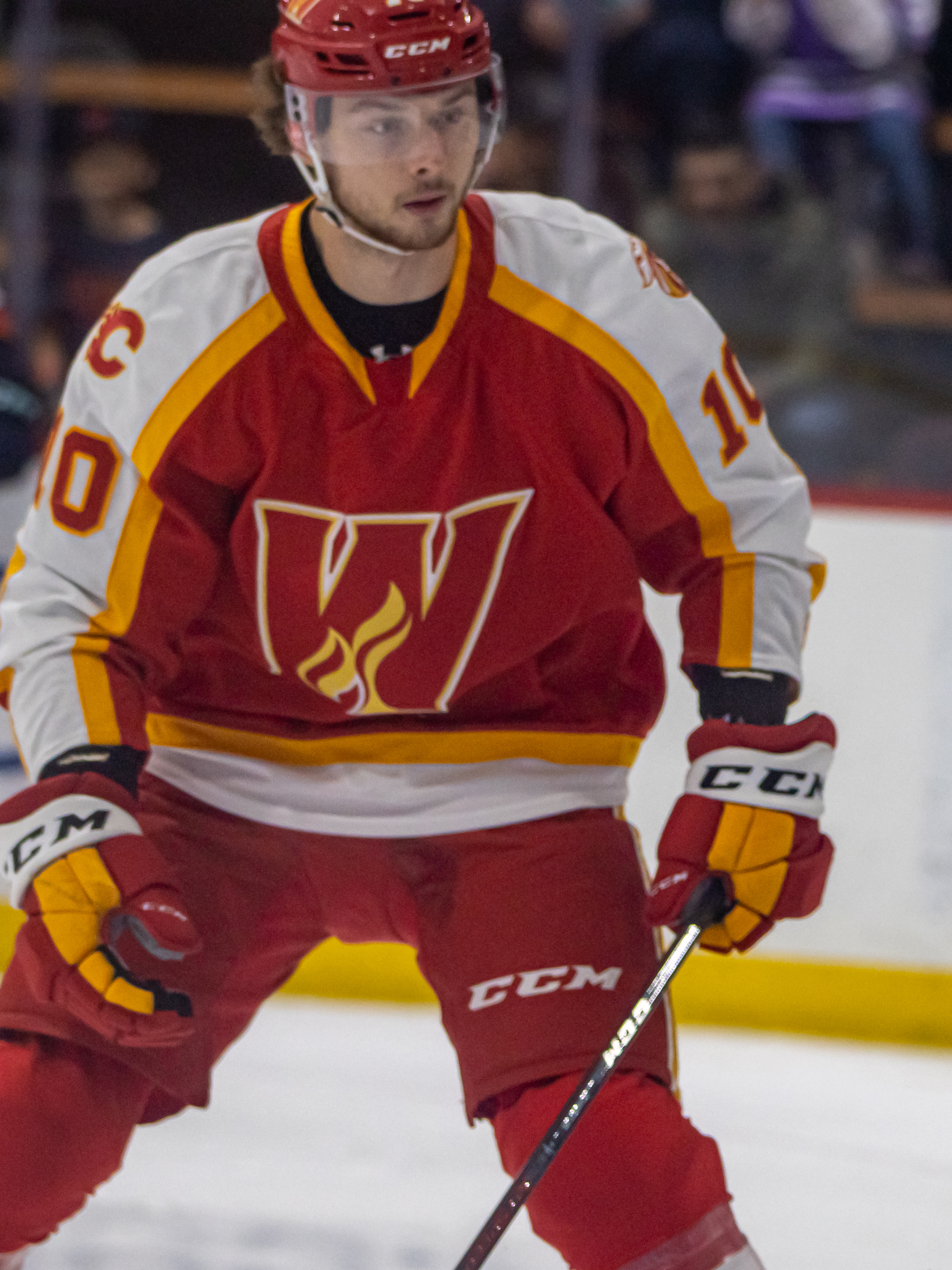
- Schwindt with the Calgary Wranglers in 2022
- Born: April 25, 2001 (age 25) Breslau, Ontario, Canada
- Height: 6 ft 2 in (188 cm)
- Weight: 183 lb (83 kg; 13 st 1 lb)
- Position: Forward
- Shoots: Right
- NHL team (P) Cur. team Former teams: Florida Panthers; Charlotte Checkers (AHL); Calgary Flames; Vegas Golden Knights
- NHL draft: 81st overall, 2019; Florida Panthers
- Playing career: 2021–present

Cole Schwindt (born April 25, 2001) is a Canadian professional ice hockey player who is a forward for the Charlotte Checkers of the American Hockey League (AHL) while under contract to the Florida Panthers of the National Hockey League (NHL). He was selected 81st overall by the Panthers in the 2019 NHL entry draft, and has also played for the Calgary Flames and Vegas Golden Knights.

== Personal life ==
Schwindt was born on April 25, 2001, in Breslau, Ontario, Canada, to parents Jason and Laura Schwindt. He grew up the oldest of three boys, both of whom play hockey as well.

== Playing career ==
Schwindt played as a youth with the Kitchener Jr. Rangers of the Alliance Hockey League before playing major junior hockey with the Mississauga Steelheads of the Ontario Hockey League (OHL).

After his second season with the Steelheads in 2018–19, Schwindt was selected in the third-round, 81st overall, by the Florida Panthers in the 2019 NHL entry draft.

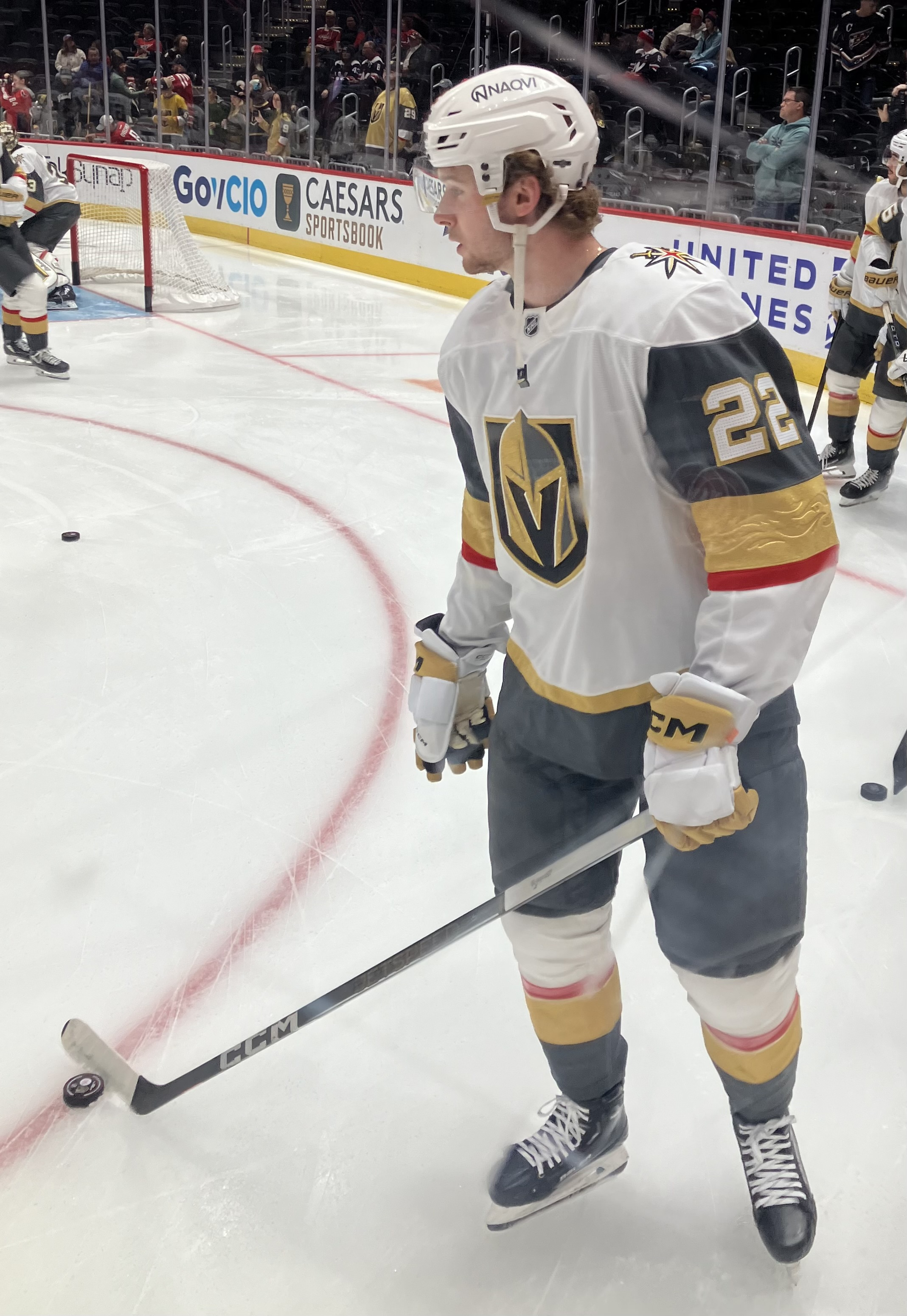
Schwindt with the Vegas Golden Knights in 2024.

In the following 2019–20 season, Schwindt appeared in 57 games with Mississauga, recording a team-leading 71 points with 28 goals and 43 assists. On April 9, 2020, Schwindt was signed by the Panthers to a three-year, entry-level contract.

With the ongoing COVID-19 pandemic delayed the commencement of the 2020–21 season, Schwindt ended his junior career and made his professional debut with the Panthers temporary AHL affiliate, the Syracuse Crunch. Remaining with the Crunch, Schwindt appeared in 10 games registering 2 points.

Approaching the 2021–22 season, Schwindt attended the Panthers training camp before he was reassigned to primary AHL affiliate, the Charlotte Checkers, to begin the campaign. While quickly regaining his scoring touch, Schwindt was leading the Checkers in goals before he received his first NHL recall to the injury affected Panthers on December 16, 2021. He was immediately inserted in the Panthers shortened lineup that day and made his NHL debut in a 4–1 loss to the Los Angeles Kings. He was then returned to continue with the Checkers on December 18, 2021.

On July 22, 2022, Schwindt was included in the blockbuster trade for the Panthers along with Jonathan Huberdeau, MacKenzie Weegar and a conditional 2025 first-round selection to the Calgary Flames in exchange for Matthew Tkachuk and a conditional fourth-round selection in 2025.

Upon finishing his entry-level contract, Schwindt signed a one-year extension with the Flames. Ahead of the 2024–25 season, however, Schwindt was claimed off waivers by the Vegas Golden Knights on October 7, 2024. On October 11, Schwindt recorded his first NHL point in his Vegas debut, recording an assist on a second-period Shea Theodore goal. Schwindt subsequently recorded his first career goal in the Golden Knights' final game of the season on April 16, scoring on an empty net late in a 4–1 victory over the Vancouver Canucks.

As a restricted free agent, Schwindt signed a one-year extension with Vegas on July 6, 2025.

On October 2, 2025, Schwindt was placed on waivers by the Golden Knights; he was subsequently claimed by his original team, the Florida Panthers, the following day.

== Career statistics ==
| | | | Regular season | | | | | Playoffs |
| Season | Team | League | GP | G | A | Pts | PIM | GP | G | A | Pts | PIM |
|---|---|---|---|---|---|---|---|---|---|---|---|---|
| 2017–18 | Mississauga Steelheads | OHL | 66 | 8 | 10 | 18 | 20 | 6 | 0 | 1 | 1 | 0 |
| 2018–19 | Mississauga Steelheads | OHL | 68 | 19 | 30 | 49 | 25 | 4 | 1 | 0 | 1 | 2 |
| 2019–20 | Mississauga Steelheads | OHL | 57 | 28 | 43 | 71 | 31 | — | — | — | — | — |
| 2020–21 | Syracuse Crunch | AHL | 10 | 1 | 1 | 2 | 10 | — | — | — | — | — |
| 2021–22 | Charlotte Checkers | AHL | 72 | 19 | 21 | 40 | 21 | 7 | 1 | 2 | 3 | 0 |
| 2021–22 | Florida Panthers | NHL | 3 | 0 | 0 | 0 | 0 | — | — | — | — | — |
| 2022–23 | Calgary Wranglers | AHL | 70 | 14 | 18 | 32 | 29 | 8 | 3 | 1 | 4 | 2 |
| 2023–24 | Calgary Wranglers | AHL | 66 | 14 | 22 | 36 | 31 | 6 | 4 | 1 | 5 | 0 |
| 2023–24 | Calgary Flames | NHL | 4 | 0 | 0 | 0 | 2 | — | — | — | — | — |
| 2024–25 | Vegas Golden Knights | NHL | 42 | 1 | 7 | 8 | 0 | 1 | 0 | 0 | 0 | 0 |
| 2025–26 | Florida Panthers | NHL | 29 | 5 | 2 | 7 | 2 | — | — | — | — | — |
| NHL totals | | | 78 | 6 | 9 | 15 | 4 | 1 | 0 | 0 | 0 | 0 |
