= List of 2025–26 NHL Three Star Awards =

The 2025–26 NHL Three Star Awards are the way the National Hockey League denotes its players of the week and players of the month of the 2025–26 season.

== Weekly ==
Weekly
Week	First Star	Second Star	Third Star
October 12, 2025	Pavel Dorofeyev (Vegas Golden Knights)	Shane Pinto (Ottawa Senators)	Sergei Bobrovsky (Florida Panthers)
October 19, 2025	Dylan Larkin (Detroit Red Wings)	Jack Eichel (Vegas Golden Knights)	Scott Wedgewood (Colorado Avalanche)
October 26, 2025	Macklin Celebrini (San Jose Sharks)	Logan Cooley (Utah Mammoth)	Jack Hughes (New Jersey Devils)
November 2, 2025	Lukáš Dostál (Anaheim Ducks)	Drake Batherson (Ottawa Senators)	Philipp Kurashev (San Jose Sharks)
November 9, 2025	Nathan MacKinnon (Colorado Avalanche)	Connor Bedard (Chicago Blackhawks)	Leo Carlsson (Anaheim Ducks)
November 16, 2025	Jason Robertson (Dallas Stars)	Alex DeBrincat (Detroit Red Wings)	Quinn Hughes (Vancouver Canucks)
November 23, 2025	Rasmus Andersson (Calgary Flames)	Zach Werenski (Columbus Blue Jackets)	Macklin Celebrini (San Jose Sharks)
November 30, 2025	Wyatt Johnston (Dallas Stars)	Brandon Hagel (Tampa Bay Lightning)	Tom Wilson (Washington Capitals)
December 7, 2025	Ilya Sorokin (New York Islanders)	Jake Oettinger (Dallas Stars)	Carter Verhaeghe (Florida Panthers)
December 14, 2025	Connor McDavid (Edmonton Oilers)	John Gibson (Detroit Red Wings)	Joel Eriksson Ek (Minnesota Wild)
December 21, 2025	Connor McDavid (Edmonton Oilers)	Linus Ullmark (Ottawa Senators)	Zach Werenski (Columbus Blue Jackets)
December 28, 2025	Nikita Kucherov (Tampa Bay Lightning)	Eeli Tolvanen (Seattle Kraken)	Juraj Slafkovský (Montreal Canadiens)
January 4, 2026	Nikita Kucherov (Tampa Bay Lightning)	Sidney Crosby (Pittsburgh Penguins)	Auston Matthews (Toronto Maple Leafs)
January 11, 2026	Tomáš Hertl (Vegas Golden Knights)	John Gibson (Detroit Red Wings)	David Pastrňák (Boston Bruins)
January 18, 2026	Tage Thompson (Buffalo Sabres)	Roman Josi (Nashville Predators)	Karel Vejmelka (Utah Mammoth)
January 25, 2026	Kirill Kaprizov (Minnesota Wild)	Nikita Kucherov (Tampa Bay Lightning)	Lukáš Dostál (Anaheim Ducks)
February 1, 2026	Jared McCann (Seattle Kraken)	Andrei Vasilevskiy (Tampa Bay Lightning)	Travis Konecny (Philadelphia Flyers)
February 5, 2026	Matt Boldy (Minnesota Wild)	Bo Horvat (New York Islanders)	Karel Vejmelka (Utah Mammoth)
March 1, 2026	Matthew Schaefer (New York Islanders)	Artūrs Šilovs (Pittsburgh Penguins)	Matt Boldy (Minnesota Wild)
March 8, 2026	Mark Scheifele (Winnipeg Jets)	Martin Nečas (Colorado Avalanche)	Tage Thompson (Buffalo Sabres)
March 15, 2026	Alexis Lafrenière (New York Rangers)	Jake Oettinger (Dallas Stars)	Jimmy Snuggerud (St. Louis Blues)
March 22, 2026	Nikita Kucherov (Tampa Bay Lightning)	Filip Forsberg (Nashville Predators)	Cole Caufield (Montreal Canadiens)
March 29, 2026	Jakub Dobeš (Montreal Canadiens)	Pavel Zacha (Boston Bruins)	John Carlson (Anaheim Ducks)
April 5, 2026	Rickard Rakell (Pittsburgh Penguins)	Jack Hughes (New Jersey Devils)	Robert Thomas (St. Louis Blues)
April 12, 2026	Anton Forsberg (Los Angeles Kings)	Linus Ullmark (Ottawa Senators)	Dylan Larkin (Detroit Red Wings)

== Monthly ==
Monthly
Month	First Star	Second Star	Third Star
October	Jack Eichel (Vegas Golden Knights)	Mark Scheifele (Winnipeg Jets)	Jakub Dobeš (Montreal Canadiens)
November	Nathan MacKinnon (Colorado Avalanche)	Jason Robertson (Dallas Stars)	Connor Bedard (Chicago Blackhawks)
December	Connor McDavid (Edmonton Oilers)	Nathan MacKinnon (Colorado Avalanche)	Macklin Celebrini (San Jose Sharks)
January	Nikita Kucherov (Tampa Bay Lightning)	David Pastrňák (Boston Bruins)	Evan Bouchard (Edmonton Oilers)
March	Nikita Kucherov (Tampa Bay Lightning)	Erik Karlsson (Pittsburgh Penguins)	Pavel Zacha (Boston Bruins)

== Rookie of the Month ==
Rookie of the Month
Month	Player
October	Matthew Schaefer (New York Islanders)
November	Jesper Wallstedt (Minnesota Wild)
December	Ivan Demidov (Montreal Canadiens)
January	Fraser Minten (Boston Bruins)
March	Jimmy Snuggerud (St. Louis Blues)
