= 2025–26 Detroit Red Wings season =

Ice hockey franchise season

2025–26 Detroit Red Wings
- Division: 6th Atlantic
- Conference: 10th Eastern
- 2025–26 record: 41–31–10
- Home record: 21–16–4
- Road record: 20–15–6
- Goals for: 241
- Goals against: 258

Team information
- General manager: Steve Yzerman
- Coach: Todd McLellan
- Captain: Dylan Larkin
- Alternate captains: Lucas Raymond; Moritz Seider
- Arena: Little Caesars Arena
- Minor league affiliates: Grand Rapids Griffins (AHL); Toledo Walleye (ECHL)

Team leaders
- Goals: Alex DeBrincat (41)
- Assists: Lucas Raymond (51)
- Points: Alex DeBrincat (84)
- Penalty minutes: Ben Chiarot; Simon Edvinsson (75)
- Plus/minus: Moritz Seider (+19)
- Wins: John Gibson (29)
- Goals against average: John Gibson (2.67)

The 2025–26 Detroit Red Wings season was the 100th season for the National Hockey League (NHL) franchise that was established on September 25, 1926. It was the Red Wings' ninth season at Little Caesars Arena. This was the Red Wings' first full season under head coach Todd McLellan, after former head coach Derek Lalonde, was fired on December 26, 2024.

On April 11, 2026, the Red Wings were eliminated from playoff contention for the tenth consecutive season for the first time in franchise history following a 5–3 loss to the New Jersey Devils. With the Buffalo Sabres ending both their 14-season playoff appearance drought and their 18-year playoff series win drought, the Red Wings now hold both the longest droughts for both categories. They finished the season with a 41–31–10 record.

== Standings ==
=== Divisional standings ===
Atlantic Division
Pos	Team	GP	W	L	OTL	RW	GF	GA	GD	Pts
1	y – Buffalo Sabres	82	50	23	9	42	288	241	+47	109
2	x – Tampa Bay Lightning	82	50	26	6	40	290	231	+59	106
3	x – Montreal Canadiens	82	48	24	10	34	283	256	+27	106
4	x – Boston Bruins	82	45	27	10	33	272	250	+22	100
5	x – Ottawa Senators	82	44	27	11	38	278	246	+32	99
6	Detroit Red Wings	82	41	31	10	30	241	258	−17	92
7	Florida Panthers	82	40	38	4	32	251	276	−25	84
8	Toronto Maple Leafs	82	32	36	14	23	253	299	−46	78

Source: National Hockey League
Rules for classification: 1) Fewer number of games played (GP, only during regular season); 2) Greater number of regulation wins (RW); 3) Greater number of wins in regulation and overtime, excluding shootout wins (ROW); 4) Greater number of total wins, including shootouts (W); 5) Greater number of points earned in head-to-head play; if teams played an uneven number of head-to-head games, the result of the first game on the home ice of the team with the extra home game is discarded; 6) Greater goal differential (GD); 7) Greater number of goals scored (GF)
x – Clinched playoff spot; y – Clinched division

=== Conference standings ===
Eastern Conference Wild Card
Pos	Div	Team	GP	W	L	OTL	RW	GF	GA	GD	Pts
1	AT	x – Boston Bruins	82	45	27	10	33	272	250	+22	100
2	AT	x – Ottawa Senators	82	44	27	11	38	278	246	+32	99
3	ME	Washington Capitals	82	43	30	9	37	263	244	+19	95
4	AT	Detroit Red Wings	82	41	31	10	30	241	258	−17	92
5	ME	Columbus Blue Jackets	82	40	30	12	28	253	253	0	92
6	ME	New York Islanders	82	43	34	5	29	233	241	−8	91
7	ME	New Jersey Devils	82	42	37	3	29	230	254	−24	87
8	AT	Florida Panthers	82	40	38	4	32	251	276	−25	84
9	AT	Toronto Maple Leafs	82	32	36	14	23	253	299	−46	78
10	ME	New York Rangers	82	34	39	9	25	238	250	−12	77

Source: National Hockey League
Rules for classification: 1) Fewer number of games played (GP, only during regular season); 2) Greater number of regulation wins (RW); 3) Greater number of wins in regulation and overtime, excluding shootout wins (ROW); 4) Greater number of total wins, including shootouts (W); 5) Greater number of points earned in head-to-head play; if teams played an uneven number of head-to-head games, the result of the first game on the home ice of the team with the extra home game is discarded; 6) Greater goal differential (GD); 7) Greater number of goals scored (GF)
x – Clinched playoff spot

== Schedule and results ==
=== Preseason ===
2025 preseason game log: 5–3–0 (Home: 3–1–0; Road: 2–2–0)
#	Date	Visitor	Score	Home	OT	Decision	Attendance	Record	Recap
1	September 23	Chicago	2–3	Detroit		Cossa	15,503	1–0–0
2	September 25	Buffalo	2–5	Detroit		Talbot	16,347	2–0–0
3	September 26	Detroit	2–3	Pittsburgh		Postava	10,729	2–1–0
4	September 27	Detroit	2–5	Buffalo		Cossa	11,872	2–2–0
5	September 29	Pittsburgh	2–1	Detroit		Gibson	15,244	2–3–0
6	September 30	Detroit	3–1	Chicago		Talbot	9,691	3–3–0
7	October 2	Detroit	3–1	Toronto		Talbot	17,846	4–3–0
8	October 4	Toronto	5–6	Detroit	OT	Gibson	17,724	5–3–0

=== Regular season ===
2025–26 game log: 41–31–10 (Home: 21–16–4; Road: 20–15–6)

October: 8–4–0 (Home: 5–1–0; Road: 3–3–0)
#	Date	Visitor	Score	Home	OT	Decision	Attendance	Record	Pts	Recap
1	October 9	Montreal	5–1	Detroit		Gibson	19,515	0–1–0	0
2	October 11	Toronto	3–6	Detroit		Talbot	19,515	1–1–0	2
3	October 13	Detroit	3–2	Toronto		Talbot	18,877	2–1–0	4
4	October 15	Florida	1–4	Detroit		Talbot	18,655	3–1–0	6
5	October 17	Tampa Bay	1–2	Detroit	OT	Gibson	19,515	4–1–0	8
6	October 19	Edmonton	2–4	Detroit		Gibson	19,515	5–1–0	10
7	October 22	Detroit	2–4	Buffalo		Gibson	15,104	5–2–0	10
8	October 23	Detroit	2–7	NY Islanders		Talbot	14,495	5–3–0	10
9	October 25	St. Louis	4–6	Detroit		Gibson	19,515	6–3–0	12
10	October 28	Detroit	5–2	St. Louis		Gibson	16,496	7–3–0	14
11	October 30	Detroit	4–3	Los Angeles	SO	Talbot	16,013	8–3–0	16
12	October 31	Detroit	2–5	Anaheim		Gibson	13,195	8–4–0	16

November: 5–7–2 (Home: 3–5–1; Road: 2–2–1)
#	Date	Visitor	Score	Home	OT	Decision	Attendance	Record	Pts	Recap
13	November 2	Detroit	3–2	San Jose	SO	Talbot	14,876	9–4–0	18
14	November 4	Detroit	0–1	Vegas		Gibson	18,025	9–5–0	18
15	November 7	NY Rangers	4–1	Detroit		Talbot	19,515	9–6–0	18
16	November 9	Chicago	5–1	Detroit		Gibson	19,515	9–7–0	18
17	November 13	Anaheim	3–6	Detroit		Talbot	19,515	10–7–0	20
18	November 15	Buffalo	5–4	Detroit	OT	Gibson	19,515	10–7–1	21
19	November 16	Detroit	2–1	NY Rangers		Talbot	18,006	11–7–1	23
20	November 18	Seattle	2–4	Detroit		Talbot	19,515	12–7–1	25
21	November 20	NY Islanders	5–0	Detroit		Gibson	18,918	12–8–1	25
22	November 22	Columbus	3–4	Detroit	OT	Talbot	19,515	13–8–1	27
23	November 24	Detroit	3–4	New Jersey		Talbot	16,514	13–9–1	27
24	November 26	Nashville	6–3	Detroit		Talbot	19,515	13–10–1	27
25	November 28	Tampa Bay	6–3	Detroit		Gibson	19,515	13–11–1	27
26	November 29	Detroit	2–3	Boston	SO	Talbot	17,850	13–11–2	28

December: 11–3–1 (Home: 6–1–0; Road: 5–2–1)
#	Date	Visitor	Score	Home	OT	Decision	Attendance	Record	Pts	Recap
27	December 2	Boston	4–5	Detroit		Gibson	19,515	14–11–2	30
28	December 4	Detroit	5–6	Columbus	SO	Talbot	16,818	14–11–3	31
29	December 6	Detroit	4–3	Seattle		Gibson	17,151	15–11–3	33
30	December 8	Detroit	4–0	Vancouver		Gibson	18,707	16–11–3	35
31	December 10	Detroit	4–3	Calgary		Gibson	17,055	17–11–3	37
32	December 11	Detroit	1–4	Edmonton		Talbot	18,347	17–12–3	37
33	December 13	Detroit	4–0	Chicago		Gibson	20,751	18–12–3	39
34	December 16	NY Islanders	2–3	Detroit		Gibson	19,515	19–12–3	41
35	December 17	Utah	4–1	Detroit		Talbot	19,515	19–13–3	41
36	December 20	Detroit	5–2	Washington		Gibson	18,347	20–13–3	43
37	December 21	Washington	2–3	Detroit	OT	Talbot	19,515	21–13–3	45
38	December 23	Dallas	3–4	Detroit	OT	Gibson	19,515	22–13–3	47
39	December 27	Detroit	2–5	Carolina		Gibson	18,321	22–14–3	47
40	December 28	Toronto	2–3	Detroit	OT	Talbot	19,515	23–14–3	49
41	December 31	Winnipeg	1–2	Detroit		Gibson	19,515	24–14–3	51

January: 8–4–3 (Home: 4–3–1; Road: 4–1–2)
#	Date	Visitor	Score	Home	OT	Decision	Attendance	Record	Pts	Recap
42	January 1	Detroit	3–4	Pittsburgh	OT	Talbot	15,540	24–14–4	52
43	January 3	Pittsburgh	4–1	Detroit		Gibson	19,515	24–15–4	52
44	January 5	Detroit	5–3	Ottawa		Gibson	16,981	25–15–4	54
45	January 8	Vancouver	1–5	Detroit		Gibson	19,515	26–15–4	56
46	January 10	Detroit	4–0	Montreal		Gibson	20,962	27–15–4	58
47	January 12	Carolina	3–4	Detroit	OT	Gibson	19,515	28–15–4	60
48	January 13	Detroit	0–3	Boston		Talbot	17,850	28–16–4	60
49	January 16	San Jose	2–4	Detroit		Gibson	19,515	29–16–4	62
50	January 18	Ottawa	3–4	Detroit	OT	Gibson	19,515	30–16–4	64
51	January 21	Detroit	2–1	Toronto	OT	Gibson	18,955	31–16–4	66
52	January 22	Detroit	3–4	Minnesota	OT	Talbot	18,067	31–16–5	67
53	January 24	Detroit	5–1	Winnipeg		Gibson	15,225	32–16–5	69
54	January 27	Los Angeles	3–1	Detroit		Gibson	19,515	32–17–5	69
55	January 29	Washington	4–3	Detroit	SO	Gibson	19,515	32–17–6	70
56	January 31	Colorado	5–0	Detroit		Gibson	19,515	32–18–6	70

February: 2–2–0 (Home: 0–0–0; Road: 2–2–0)
#	Date	Visitor	Score	Home	OT	Decision	Attendance	Record	Pts	Recap
57	February 2	Detroit	2–0	Colorado		Gibson	18,145	33–18–6	72
58	February 4	Detroit	1–4	Utah		Gibson	12,478	33–19–6	72
Winter Olympics break in Milan
59	February 26	Detroit	2–1	Ottawa	OT	Gibson	17,190	34–19–6	74
60	February 28	Detroit	2–5	Carolina		Talbot	18,571	34–20–6	74

March: 5–7–2 (Home: 2–4–1; Road: 3–3–1)
#	Date	Visitor	Score	Home	OT	Decision	Attendance	Record	Pts	Recap
61	March 2	Detroit	4–2	Nashville		Talbot	17,300	35–20–6	76
62	March 4	Vegas	4–3	Detroit	OT	Talbot	19,515	35–20–7	77
63	March 6	Florida	3–1	Detroit		Gibson	19,515	35–21–7	77
64	March 8	Detroit	3–0	New Jersey		Gibson	16,514	36–21–7	79
65	March 10	Detroit	3–4	Florida		Gibson	19,528	36–22–7	79
66	March 12	Detroit	1–4	Tampa Bay		Gibson	19,092	36–23–7	79
67	March 14	Detroit	2–3	Dallas	OT	Gibson	18,532	36–23–8	80
68	March 16	Calgary	2–5	Detroit		Gibson	19,515	37–23–8	82
69	March 19	Montreal	1–3	Detroit		Gibson	19,515	38–23–8	84
70	March 21	Boston	4–2	Detroit		Gibson	19,515	38–24–8	84
71	March 24	Ottawa	3–2	Detroit		Gibson	19,515	38–25–8	84
72	March 27	Detroit	5–2	Buffalo		Gibson	19,070	39–25–8	86
73	March 28	Philadelphia	5–3	Detroit		Gibson	19,515	39–26–8	86
74	March 31	Detroit	1–5	Pittsburgh		Gibson	18,399	39–27–8	86

April: 2–4–2 (Home: 1–2–1; Road: 1–2–1)
#	Date	Visitor	Score	Home	OT	Decision	Attendance	Record	Pts	Recap
75	April 2	Detroit	4–2	Philadelphia		Gibson	19,865	40–27–8	88
76	April 4	Detroit	1–4	NY Rangers		Gibson	17,292	40–28–8	88
77	April 5	Minnesota	5–4	Detroit		Talbot	17,892	40–29–8	88
78	April 7	Columbus	4–3	Detroit	SO	Gibson	17,687	40–29–9	89
79	April 9	Philadelphia	3–6	Detroit		Gibson	18,197	41–29–9	91
80	April 11	New Jersey	5–3	Detroit		Gibson	19,515	41–30–9	91
81	April 13	Detroit	3–4	Tampa Bay	OT	Talbot	19,092	41–30–10	92
82	April 15	Detroit	1–8	Florida		Gibson	19,403	41–31–10	92

Legend: Win (2 points) Loss (0 points) Overtime/shootout loss (1 point)

== Player statistics ==
Stats updated as of April 15, 2026

=== Skaters ===
Regular season
Player	GP	G	A	Pts	+/−	PIM
Alex DeBrincat	82	41	44	85	+8	19
Lucas Raymond	80	25	51	76	+1	22
Dylan Larkin	74	34	33	67	+3	48
Moritz Seider	82	10	50	60	+15	57
Patrick Kane	67	16	41	57	−1	16
Andrew Copp	79	9	34	43	+3	24
James van Riemsdyk	72	15	16	31	−17	14
Emmitt Finnie	82	13	17	30	−10	6
J.T. Compher	82	11	17	28	−13	27
Simon Edvinsson	72	9	16	25	+12	75
Axel Sandin Pellikka	68	7	14	21	−20	18
Marco Kasper	81	9	10	19	−20	33
Ben Chiarot	82	5	10	15	−9	75
Mason Appleton	65	6	8	14	−4	44
Michael Rasmussen	64	6	8	14	−10	8
Albert Johansson	82	3	8	11	−18	16
Justin Faulk^{†}	17	5	3	8	−5	10
Nate Danielson	28	2	5	7	−7	4
Jonatan Berggren^{‡}	15	2	4	6	−3	6
Jacob Bernard-Docker	63	1	4	5	0	25
John Leonard	11	2	2	4	−3	0
David Perron^{†}	16	3	0	3	−9	18
Dominik Shine	18	3	0	3	0	7
Elmer Soderblom^{‡}	39	2	1	3	−4	12
Travis Hamonic	26	0	2	2	−11	29
Michael Brandsegg-Nygard	14	0	1	1	−5	2
Erik Gustafsson	2	0	0	0	−2	2
Sheldon Dries	5	0	0	0	0	0
Carter Mazur	8	0	0	0	−3	0

=== Goaltenders ===
Regular season
Player	GP	GS	TOI	W	L	OT	GA	GAA	SA	SV%	SO	G	A	PIM
John Gibson	57	57	3181:14	29	22	4	144	2.72	1461	.901	4	0	1	4
Cam Talbot	34	25	1750:11	12	9	6	93	3.19	797	.883	0	0	1	0

^{†}Denotes player spent time with another team before joining the Red Wings. Stats reflect time with the Red Wings only.
^{‡}Denotes player was traded mid-season. Stats reflect time with the Red Wings only.
Bold/italics denotes franchise record.

== Awards and honors ==
=== Milestones ===
Regular season
Player	Milestone	Reached
Lucas Raymond	100th career NHL goal	October 11, 2025
Patrick Kane	500th career NHL goal	January 8, 2026
Lucas Raymond	300th career NHL point	January 8, 2026
Lucas Raymond	200th career NHL assist	March 3, 2026
Dominik Shine	1st career NHL goal	March 8, 2026

== Transactions ==
The Red Wings have been involved in the following transactions during the 2025–26 season.

=== Trades ===
Date	Details		Ref
June 28, 2025	To Detroit Red Wings John Gibson	To Anaheim Ducks Petr Mrazek; 4th-round pick in 2026; 2nd-round pick in 2027	
June 30, 2025	To Detroit Red Wings Future considerations	To Minnesota Wild Vladimir Tarasenko	
March 5, 2026	To Detroit Red Wings David Perron	To Ottawa Senators conditional (Note: Ottawa will receive Detroit's third-round pick in 2026 if Detroit advances to the second round of the 2026 playoffs and Perron appears in at least 50% of their first round games. Ottawa will receive Columbus' fourth-round pick in 2026 if Perron plays in at least one regular season or playoff game, but Detroit does not advance past the first round, or Perron appears in fewer than 50% of their first round games; otherwise, no pick will be exchanged.) DET 3rd-round pick in 2026 or CBJ 4th-round pick in 2026	
March 6, 2026	To Detroit Red Wings SJS 3rd-round pick in 2026	To Pittsburgh Penguins Elmer Soderblom	
March 6, 2026	To Detroit Red Wings Justin Faulk	To St. Louis Blues Dmitri Buchelnikov; Justin Holl; 1st-round pick in 2026; SJS 3rd-round pick in 2026	
March 12, 2026	To Detroit Red Wings Michael Milne; Wojciech Stachowiak	To Tampa Bay Lightning Ian Mitchell	
June 25, 2026	To Detroit Red Wings 4th-round pick in 2026	To New Jersey Devils Amadeus Lombardi	
June 26, 2026	To Detroit Red Wings BOS 1st-round pick in 2026	To Utah Mammoth Sebastian Cossa	

=== Free agents ===
Date	Player	Team	Contract term	Ref
July 1, 2025	Ian Mitchell	from Boston Bruins	1-year	
July 1, 2025	Jacob Bernard-Docker	from Buffalo Sabres	1-year	
July 1, 2025	James van Riemsdyk	from Columbus Blue Jackets	1-year	
July 1, 2025	Jeff Petry	to Florida Panthers	1-year	
July 1, 2025	Alex Lyon	to Buffalo Sabres	2-year	
July 2, 2025	Mason Appleton	from Winnipeg Jets	2-year	
August 15, 2025	Travis Hamonic	from Ottawa Senators	1-year	

=== Signings ===
Date	Player	Contract term	Ref
June 26, 2025	Antti Tuomisto	1-year	
June 27, 2025	William Lagesson	2-year	
June 30, 2025	Albert Johansson	2-year	
June 30, 2025	Jonatan Berggren	1-year	
June 30, 2025	Patrick Kane	1-year	
July 1, 2025	Michal Postava	2-year	
July 1, 2025	John Leonard	1-year	
July 2, 2025	Elmer Söderblom	2-year	
January 10, 2026	Dominik Shine	2-year	
January 28, 2026	Ben Chiarot	3-year	
February 1, 2026	Sheldon Dries	2-year	
March 15, 2026	Eddie Genborg	3-year	
March 25, 2026	Jacob Bernard-Docker	2-year	
June 25, 2026	William Wallinder	2-year	

== Draft picks ==
Below are the Detroit Red Wings' selections at the 2025 NHL entry draft, which was held on June 27 and 28, 2025, at the Peacock Theater in Los Angeles, California.

Round	#	Player	Pos	Nationality	College/Junior/Club Team (League)
1	13	Carter Bear	LW	Canada	Everett Silvertips (WHL)
2	44	Eddie Genborg	RW	Sweden	Linköping HC (SHL)
3	75^{1}	Michal Pradel	G	Slovakia	Tri-City Storm (USHL)
4	109^{2}	Brent Solomon	RW	United States	Sioux Falls Stampede (USHL)
4	119^{3}	Michal Svrcek	LW	Slovakia	Brynäs IF (SHL)
5	140	Nikita Tyurin	D	Russia	Moscow Spartak Jr. (MHL)
6	172	Will Murphy	D	Canada	Cape Breton Eagles (QMJHL)
7	204	Grayden Robertson-Palmer	C	Canada	Phillips-Andover Academy (USHS-Prep)

Notes:

1. The New York Rangers' third-round pick went to the Detroit Red Wings as the result of a trade on October 29, 2024, that sent Olli Maatta to Utah in exchange for this pick.
2. The Columbus Blue Jackets' fourth-round pick went to the Red Wings as the result of a trade on June 28, 2025, that sent a third-round pick in 2025 (76th overall) to Columbus in exchange for a fourth-round pick in 2026 and this pick.
3. The Tampa Bay Lightning's fourth-round pick went to the Red Wings as the result of a trade on March 5, 2025, that sent Yanni Gourde to Tampa Bay in exchange for this pick (being conditional at the time). The condition – Detroit will receive the higher of Edmonton or Tampa Bay's fourth-round picks in 2025 – was converted when the Edmonton advanced to the Western Conference finals on May 14, 2025.
