= 2025–26 Nashville Predators season =

National Hockey League season

2025–26 Nashville Predators
- Division: 6th Central
- Conference: 10th Western
- 2025–26 record: 38–34–10
- Home record: 21–17–4
- Road record: 17–17–7
- Goals for: 247
- Goals against: 269

Team information
- General manager: Barry Trotz
- Coach: Andrew Brunette
- Captain: Roman Josi
- Alternate captains: Filip Forsberg; Ryan O'Reilly; Steven Stamkos
- Arena: Bridgestone Arena
- Minor league affiliates: Milwaukee Admirals (AHL); Atlanta Gladiators (ECHL)

Team leaders
- Goals: Steven Stamkos (42)
- Assists: Ryan O'Reilly (49)
- Points: Filip Forsberg (75)
- Penalty minutes: Michael McCarron (73)
- Plus/minus: Ryan O'Reilly (+8)
- Wins: Juuse Saros (28)
- Goals against average: Justus Annunen (2.68)

The 2025–26 Nashville Predators season was the 27th season for the National Hockey League (NHL) franchise that was established on June 25, 1997.

On April 13, 2026, the Predators were eliminated from playoff contention for the second consecutive season following their loss to the San Jose Sharks and a win by the Los Angeles Kings against the Seattle Kraken.

== Standings ==
=== Divisional standings ===
Central Division
| Pos | Team | GP | W | L | OTL | RW | GF | GA | GD | Pts |
|---|---|---|---|---|---|---|---|---|---|---|
| 1 | p – Colorado Avalanche | 82 | 55 | 16 | 11 | 48 | 302 | 203 | +99 | 121 |
| 2 | x – Dallas Stars | 82 | 50 | 20 | 12 | 38 | 279 | 226 | +53 | 112 |
| 3 | x – Minnesota Wild | 82 | 46 | 24 | 12 | 31 | 272 | 240 | +32 | 104 |
| 4 | x – Utah Mammoth | 82 | 43 | 33 | 6 | 33 | 268 | 240 | +28 | 92 |
| 5 | St. Louis Blues | 82 | 37 | 33 | 12 | 33 | 231 | 258 | −27 | 86 |
| 6 | Nashville Predators | 82 | 38 | 34 | 10 | 28 | 247 | 269 | −22 | 86 |
| 7 | Winnipeg Jets | 82 | 35 | 35 | 12 | 28 | 231 | 260 | −29 | 82 |
| 8 | Chicago Blackhawks | 82 | 29 | 39 | 14 | 21 | 213 | 275 | −62 | 72 |

Source: National Hockey League
Rules for classification: 1) Fewer number of games played (GP, only during regular season); 2) Greater number of regulation wins (RW); 3) Greater number of wins in regulation and overtime, excluding shootout wins (ROW); 4) Greater number of total wins, including shootouts (W); 5) Greater number of points earned in head-to-head play; if teams played an uneven number of head-to-head games, the result of the first game on the home ice of the team with the extra home game is discarded; 6) Greater goal differential (GD); 7) Greater number of goals scored (GF)
p – Clinched Presidents' Trophy; x – Clinched playoff spot

=== Conference standings ===
Western Conference Wild Card
| Pos | Div | Team | GP | W | L | OTL | RW | GF | GA | GD | Pts |
|---|---|---|---|---|---|---|---|---|---|---|---|
| 1 | CE | x – Utah Mammoth | 82 | 43 | 33 | 6 | 33 | 268 | 240 | +28 | 92 |
| 2 | PA | x – Los Angeles Kings | 82 | 35 | 27 | 20 | 22 | 225 | 247 | −22 | 90 |
| 3 | CE | St. Louis Blues | 82 | 37 | 33 | 12 | 33 | 231 | 258 | −27 | 86 |
| 4 | CE | Nashville Predators | 82 | 38 | 34 | 10 | 28 | 247 | 269 | −22 | 86 |
| 5 | PA | San Jose Sharks | 82 | 39 | 35 | 8 | 27 | 251 | 292 | −41 | 86 |
| 6 | CE | Winnipeg Jets | 82 | 35 | 35 | 12 | 28 | 231 | 260 | −29 | 82 |
| 7 | PA | Seattle Kraken | 82 | 34 | 37 | 11 | 26 | 226 | 263 | −37 | 79 |
| 8 | PA | Calgary Flames | 82 | 34 | 39 | 9 | 27 | 212 | 259 | −47 | 77 |
| 9 | CE | Chicago Blackhawks | 82 | 29 | 39 | 14 | 22 | 213 | 275 | −62 | 72 |
| 10 | PA | Vancouver Canucks | 82 | 25 | 49 | 8 | 15 | 216 | 316 | −100 | 58 |

Source: National Hockey League
Rules for classification: 1) Fewer number of games played (GP, only during regular season); 2) Greater number of regulation wins (RW); 3) Greater number of wins in regulation and overtime, excluding shootout wins (ROW); 4) Greater number of total wins, including shootouts (W); 5) Greater number of points earned in head-to-head play; if teams played an uneven number of head-to-head games, the result of the first game on the home ice of the team with the extra home game is discarded; 6) Greater goal differential (GD); 7) Greater number of goals scored (GF)
x – Clinched playoff spot

== Schedule and results ==
=== Preseason ===
The preseason schedule was released on June 24, 2025.

2025–26 game log

2025 preseason game log: 3–2–1 (home: 3–0–1; road: 0–2–0)
| # | Date | Visitor | Score | Home | OT | Decision | Location | Attendance | Record | Recap |
|---|---|---|---|---|---|---|---|---|---|---|
| 1 | September 21^{A} | Florida | 0–5 | Nashville | | Annunen | Bridgestone Arena | 5,496 | 1–0–0 |
| 2 | September 21^{A} | Florida | 3–5 | Nashville | | Chrona | Bridgestone Arena | 17,059 | 2–0–0 |
| 3 | September 23 | Tampa Bay | 3–2 | Nashville | | Annunen | Bridgestone Arena | 17,159 | 2–0–1 |
| 4 | September 27 | Nashville | 1–4 | Tampa Bay | | Saros | Benchmark International Arena | 14,228 | 2–1–1 |
| 5 | September 28 | Nashville | 2–4 | Carolina | | Annunen | Lenovo Center | 14,211 | 2–2–1 |
| 6 | October 4 | Carolina | 3–2 | Nashville | OT | Saros | Bridgestone Arena | 17,724 | 3–2–1 |

Notes:
^{A} Indicates split-squad.

=== Regular season ===
The regular season schedule was announced on July 16, 2025.

2025–26 game log: 38–34–10 (home: 21–16–3; away: 17–18–7)

October: 4–6–2 (home: 3–3–1; road: 1–3–1)
| # | Date | Visitor | Score | Home | OT | Decision | Location | Attendance | Record | Pts | Recap |
|---|---|---|---|---|---|---|---|---|---|---|---|
| 1 | October 9 | Columbus | 1–2 | Nashville | | Saros | Bridgestone Arena | 17,244 | 1–0–0 | 2 |
| 2 | October 11 | Utah | 3–2 | Nashville | OT | Saros | Bridgestone Arena | 17,117 | 1–0–1 | 3 |
| 3 | October 13 | Nashville | 4–1 | Ottawa | | Saros | Canadian Tire Centre | 18,500 | 2–0–1 | 5 |
| 4 | October 14 | Nashville | 4–7 | Toronto | | Annunen | Scotiabank Arena | 18,124 | 2–1–1 | 5 |
| 5 | October 16 | Nashville | 2–3 | Montreal | OT | Saros | Bell Centre | 20,962 | 2–1–2 | 6 |
| 6 | October 18 | Nashville | 1–4 | Winnipeg | | Saros | Canada Life Centre | 14,309 | 2–2–2 | 6 |
| 7 | October 21 | Anaheim | 5–2 | Nashville | | Saros | Bridgestone Arena | 17,159 | 2–3–2 | 6 |
| 8 | October 23 | Vancouver | 1–2 | Nashville | | Saros | Bridgestone Arena | 17,159 | 3–3–2 | 8 |
| 9 | October 25 | Los Angeles | 4–5 | Nashville | SO | Saros | Bridgestone Arena | 17,159 | 4–3–2 | 10 |
| 10 | October 26 | Dallas | 3–2 | Nashville | | Annunen | Bridgestone Arena | 17,159 | 4–4–2 | 10 |
| 11 | October 28 | Tampa Bay | 5–2 | Nashville | | Saros | Bridgestone Arena | 17,159 | 4–5–2 | 10 |
| 12 | October 30 | Nashville | 1–4 | Philadelphia | | Saros | Xfinity Mobile Arena | 15,812 | 4–6–2 | 10 |

November: 4–7–2 (home: 2–5–1; road: 2–2–1)
| # | Date | Visitor | Score | Home | OT | Decision | Location | Attendance | Record | Pts | Recap |
|---|---|---|---|---|---|---|---|---|---|---|---|
| 13 | November 1 | Calgary | 2–4 | Nashville | | Saros | Bridgestone Arena | 17,159 | 5–6–2 | 12 |
| 14 | November 3 | Vancouver | 5–4 | Nashville | OT | Saros | Bridgestone Arena | 17,159 | 5–6–3 | 13 |
| 15 | November 4 | Nashville | 2–3 | Minnesota | OT | Annunen | Grand Casino Arena | 16,253 | 5–6–4 | 14 |
| 16 | November 6 | Philadelphia | 3–1 | Nashville | | Saros | Bridgestone Arena | 17,159 | 5–7–4 | 14 |
| 17 | November 8 | Dallas | 5–4 | Nashville | | Annunen | Bridgestone Arena | 17,159 | 5–8–4 | 14 |
| 18 | November 10 | Nashville | 3–6 | NY Rangers | | Saros | Madison Square Garden | 18,006 | 5–9–4 | 14 |
| 19 | November 14 | Pittsburgh | 1–2 | Nashville | OT | Saros | Avicii Arena | 12,766 | 6–9–4 | 16 |
| 20 | November 16 | Nashville | 0–4 | Pittsburgh | | Saros | Avicii Arena | 12,723 | 6–10–4 | 16 |
| 21 | November 22 | Colorado | 3–0 | Nashville | | Saros | Bridgestone Arena | 17,457 | 6–11–4 | 16 |
| 22 | November 24 | Florida | 8–3 | Nashville | | Saros | Bridgestone Arena | 17,431 | 6–12–4 | 16 |
| 23 | November 26 | Nashville | 6–3 | Detroit | | Annunen | Little Caesars Arena | 19,515 | 7–12–4 | 18 |
| 24 | November 28 | Nashville | 4–3 | Chicago | | Saros | United Center | 19,755 | 8–12–4 | 20 |
| 25 | November 29 | Winnipeg | 5–2 | Nashville | | Annunen | Bridgestone Arena | 17,159 | 8–13–4 | 20 |

December: 10–4–0 (home: 5–1–0; road: 5–3–0)
| # | Date | Visitor | Score | Home | OT | Decision | Location | Attendance | Record | Pts | Recap |
|---|---|---|---|---|---|---|---|---|---|---|---|
| 26 | December 2 | Calgary | 1–5 | Nashville | | Saros | Bridgestone Arena | 17,159 | 9–13–4 | 22 |
| 27 | December 4 | Nashville | 2–1 | Florida | OT | Saros | Amerant Bank Arena | 19,340 | 10–13–4 | 24 |
| 28 | December 6 | Nashville | 3–6 | Carolina | | Saros | Lenovo Center | 18,299 | 10–14–4 | 24 |
| 29 | December 9 | Colorado | 3–4 | Nashville | SO | Saros | Bridgestone Arena | 17,159 | 11–14–4 | 26 |
| 30 | December 11 | St. Louis | 2–7 | Nashville | | Saros | Bridgestone Arena | 17,159 | 12–14–4 | 28 |
| 31 | December 13 | Nashville | 2–4 | Colorado | | Annunen | Ball Arena | 18,130 | 12–15–4 | 28 |
| 32 | December 15 | Nashville | 5–2 | St. Louis | | Saros | Enterprise Center | 18,096 | 13–15–4 | 30 |
| 33 | December 17 | Carolina | 4–1 | Nashville | | Saros | Bridgestone Arena | 17,159 | 13–16–4 | 30 |
| 34 | December 20 | Toronto | 3–5 | Nashville | | Saros | Bridgestone Arena | 17,159 | 14–16–4 | 32 |
| 35 | December 21 | NY Rangers | 1–2 | Nashville | | Annunen | Bridgestone Arena | 17,159 | 15–16–4 | 34 |
| 36 | December 23 | Nashville | 3–2 | Minnesota | OT | Saros | Grand Casino Arena | 19,033 | 16–16–4 | 36 |
| 37 | December 27 | Nashville | 2–3 | St. Louis | | Saros | Enterprise Center | 18,096 | 16–17–4 | 36 |
| 38 | December 29 | Nashville | 4–3 | Utah | | Saros | Delta Center | 12,478 | 17–17–4 | 38 |
| 39 | December 31 | Nashville | 4–2 | Vegas | | Annunen | T-Mobile Arena | 17,970 | 18–17–4 | 40 |

January: 7–6–2 (home: 4–3–0; road: 3–3–2)
| # | Date | Visitor | Score | Home | OT | Decision | Location | Attendance | Record | Pts | Recap |
|---|---|---|---|---|---|---|---|---|---|---|---|
| 40 | January 1 | Nashville | 1–4 | Seattle | | Saros | Climate Pledge Arena | 17,151 | 18–18–4 | 40 |
| 41 | January 3 | Nashville | 4–3 | Calgary | | Saros | Scotiabank Saddledome | 17,137 | 19–18–4 | 42 |
| 42 | January 6 | Nashville | 2–6 | Edmonton | | Saros | Rogers Place | 18,347 | 19–19–4 | 42 |
| 43 | January 8 | NY Islanders | 1–2 | Nashville | SO | Saros | Bridgestone Arena | 17,159 | 20–19–4 | 44 |
| 44 | January 10 | Chicago | 3–0 | Nashville | | Saros | Bridgestone Arena | 17,297 | 20–20–4 | 44 |
| 45 | January 11 | Washington | 2–3 | Nashville | | Annunen | Bridgestone Arena | 17,159 | 21–20–4 | 46 |
| 46 | January 13 | Edmonton | 3–4 | Nashville | OT | Saros | Bridgestone Arena | 17,159 | 22–20–4 | 48 |
| 47 | January 16 | Nashville | 7–3 | Colorado | | Saros | Ball Arena | 18,143 | 23–20–4 | 50 |
| 48 | January 17 | Nashville | 2–7 | Vegas | | Annunen | T-Mobile Arena | 17,988 | 23–21–4 | 50 |
| 49 | January 20 | Buffalo | 5–3 | Nashville | | Saros | Bridgestone Arena | 17,159 | 23–22–4 | 50 |
| 50 | January 22 | Ottawa | 3–5 | Nashville | | Saros | Bridgestone Arena | 17,159 | 24–22–4 | 52 |
| 51 | January 24 | Utah | 5–2 | Nashville | | Saros | Bridgestone Arena | 17,159 | 24–23–4 | 52 |
| 52 | January 27 | Nashville | 2–3 | Boston | OT | Saros | TD Garden | 17,850 | 24–23–5 | 53 |
| 53 | January 29 | Nashville | 2–3 | New Jersey | OT | Annunen | Prudential Center | 15,788 | 24–23–6 | 54 |
| 54 | January 31 | Nashville | 4–3 | NY Islanders | | Saros | UBS Arena | 17,255 | 25–23–6 | 56 |

February: 2–1–2 (home: 2–0–1; road: 0–1–1)
| # | Date | Visitor | Score | Home | OT | Decision | Location | Attendance | Record | Pts | Recap |
|---|---|---|---|---|---|---|---|---|---|---|---|
| 55 | February 2 | St. Louis | 5–6 | Nashville | | Annunen | Bridgestone Arena | 17,159 | 26–23–6 | 58 |
| 56 | February 4 | Minnesota | 6–5 | Nashville | OT | Saros | Bridgestone Arena | 17,235 | 26–23–7 | 59 |
| 57 | February 5 | Nashville | 2–4 | Washington | | Annunen | Capital One Arena | 18,347 | 26–24–7 | 59 |
| 58 | February 26 | Chicago | 2–4 | Nashville | | Annunen | Bridgestone Arena | 17,224 | 27–24–7 | 61 |
| 59 | February 28 | Nashville | 2–3 | Dallas | OT | Saros | American Airlines Center | 18,532 | 27–24–8 | 62 |

March: 7–7–1 (home: 4–2–0; road: 3–5–1)
| # | Date | Visitor | Score | Home | OT | Decision | Location | Attendance | Record | Pts | Recap |
|---|---|---|---|---|---|---|---|---|---|---|---|
| 60 | March 2 | Detroit | 4–2 | Nashville | | Saros | Bridgestone Arena | 17,300 | 27–25–8 | 62 |
| 61 | March 3 | Nashville | 2–3 | Columbus | | Annunen | Nationwide Arena | 16,526 | 27–26–8 | 62 |
| 62 | March 5 | Boston | 3–6 | Nashville | | Saros | Bridgestone Arena | 17,330 | 28–26–8 | 64 |
| 63 | March 7 | Nashville | 2–3 | Buffalo | | Saros | KeyBank Center | 19,070 | 28–27–9 | 64 |
| 64 | March 10 | Nashville | 4–2 | Seattle | | Saros | Climate Pledge Arena | 17,151 | 29–27–8 | 66 |
| 65 | March 12 | Nashville | 3–4 | Vancouver | SO | Saros | Rogers Arena | 18,521 | 29–27–9 | 67 |
| 66 | March 15 | Nashville | 1–3 | Edmonton | | Annunen | Rogers Place | 18,347 | 29–28–9 | 67 |
| 67 | March 17 | Nashville | 4–3 | Winnipeg | SO | Saros | Canada Life Centre | 13,559 | 30–28–9 | 69 |
| 68 | March 19 | Seattle | 1–3 | Nashville | | Annunen | Bridgestone Arena | 17,159 | 31–28–9 | 71 |
| 69 | March 21 | Vegas | 1–4 | Nashville | | Annunen | Bridgestone Arena | 17,439 | 32–28–9 | 73 |
| 70 | March 22 | Nashville | 3–2 | Chicago | OT | Saros | United Center | 20,553 | 33–28–9 | 75 |
| 71 | March 24 | San Jose | 3–6 | Nashville | | Saros | Bridgestone Arena | 17,159 | 34–28–9 | 77 |
| 72 | March 26 | New Jersey | 4–2 | Nashville | | Annunen | Bridgestone Arena | 17,159 | 34–29–9 | 77 |
| 73 | March 28 | Montreal | 4–1 | Nashville | | Saros | Bridgestone Arena | 17,720 | 34–30–9 | 77 |
| 74 | March 29 | Nashville | 2–3 | Tampa Bay | | Annunen | Benchmark International Arena | 19,092 | 34–31–9 | 77 |

April: 4–3–1 (home: 1–2–0; road: 3–1–1)
| # | Date | Visitor | Score | Home | OT | Decision | Location | Attendance | Record | Pts | Recap |
|---|---|---|---|---|---|---|---|---|---|---|---|
| 75 | April 2 | Nashville | 5–4 | Los Angeles | SO | Saros | Crypto.com Arena | 18,145 | 35–31–9 | 79 |
| 76 | April 4 | Nashville | 6–3 | San Jose | | Saros | SAP Center | 17,435 | 36–31–9 | 81 |
| 77 | April 6 | Nashville | 2–3 | Los Angeles | SO | Saros | Crypto.com Arena | 17,540 | 36–31–10 | 82 |
| 78 | April 7 | Nashville | 5–0 | Anaheim | | Annunen | Honda Center | 15,556 | 37–31–10 | 84 |
| 79 | April 9 | Nashville | 1–4 | Utah | | Saros | Delta Center | 12,478 | 37–32–10 | 84 |
| 80 | April 11 | Minnesota | 1–2 | Nashville | | Annunen | Bridgestone Arena | 17,761 | 38–32–10 | 86 |
| 81 | April 13 | San Jose | 3–2 | Nashville | | Annunen | Bridgestone Arena | 17,388 | 38–33–10 | 86 |
| 82 | April 16 | Anaheim | 5–4 | Nashville | | Saros | Bridgestone Arena | 17,332 | 38–34–10 | 86 |

Legend: Win (2 points) Loss (0 points) Overtime/shootout loss (1 point)
Notes:
^{A} Game played at Avicii Arena in Stockholm, Sweden

== Player statistics ==
Updated to games played April 16, 2026

=== Skaters ===
Regular season
| Player | GP | G | A | Pts | +/- | PIM |
|---|---|---|---|---|---|---|
| Filip Forsberg | 82 | 40 | 35 | 75 | −2 | 34 |
| Ryan O'Reilly | 81 | 25 | 49 | 74 | +8 | 22 |
| Steven Stamkos | 82 | 42 | 24 | 66 | −17 | 58 |
| Luke Evangelista | 81 | 12 | 44 | 56 | +1 | 28 |
| Roman Josi | 68 | 13 | 42 | 55 | −15 | 30 |
| Erik Haula | 81 | 14 | 24 | 38 | −15 | 64 |
| Michael Bunting^{‡} | 61 | 13 | 18 | 31 | −17 | 16 |
| Jonathan Marchessault | 62 | 12 | 19 | 31 | −18 | 30 |
| Matthew Wood | 71 | 17 | 13 | 30 | −3 | 14 |
| Brady Skjei | 82 | 3 | 23 | 26 | −7 | 40 |
| Nick Blankenburg^{‡} | 49 | 6 | 15 | 21 | −11 | 10 |
| Fedor Svechkov | 70 | 4 | 13 | 17 | −6 | 22 |
| Tyson Jost | 69 | 8 | 8 | 16 | −21 | 30 |
| Adam Wilsby | 58 | 1 | 15 | 16 | +2 | 29 |
| Nicolas Hague | 62 | 3 | 12 | 15 | −10 | 47 |
| Nick Perbix | 79 | 3 | 10 | 13 | −14 | 20 |
| Michael McCarron^{‡} | 59 | 5 | 7 | 12 | −15 | 73 |
| Ryan Ufko | 18 | 2 | 9 | 11 | 0 | 6 |
| Cole Smith^{‡} | 42 | 6 | 4 | 10 | −7 | 31 |
| Spencer Stastney^{‡} | 30 | 1 | 8 | 9 | −1 | 10 |
| Justin Barron | 52 | 0 | 9 | 9 | −1 | 17 |
| Reid Schaefer | 47 | 6 | 2 | 8 | −12 | 17 |
| Zachary L'Heureux | 25 | 4 | 1 | 5 | +3 | 21 |
| Ozzy Wiesblatt | 40 | 1 | 4 | 5 | −6 | 38 |
| Joakim Kemell | 16 | 1 | 2 | 3 | +2 | 0 |
| Cole O'Hara | 1 | 0 | 1 | 1 | +1 | 0 |
| Brady Martin | 3 | 0 | 1 | 1 | 0 | 0 |
| Kevin Gravel | 1 | 0 | 0 | 0 | 0 | 0 |
| Jordan Oesterle | 1 | 0 | 0 | 0 | −1 | 0 |
| Andreas Englund | 3 | 0 | 0 | 0 | −1 | 2 |

=== Goaltenders ===
Regular season
| Player | GP | GS | TOI | W | L | OT | GA | GAA | SA | SV% | SO | G | A | PIM |
|---|---|---|---|---|---|---|---|---|---|---|---|---|---|---|
| Juuse Saros | 59 | 59 | 3432:33 | 28 | 22 | 8 | 181 | 3.16 | 1700 | .894 | 0 | 0 | 0 | 2 |
| Justus Annunen | 28 | 23 | 1500:32 | 10 | 12 | 2 | 67 | 2.68 | 711 | .907 | 1 | 0 | 0 | 2 |

^{†}Denotes player spent time with another team before joining the Predators. Stats reflect time with the Predators only.
^{‡}Denotes player was traded mid-season. Stats reflect time with the Predators only.
Bold/italics denotes franchise record.

== Transactions ==
The Predators have been involved in the following transactions during the 2025–26 season.

Key:

† Contract is entry-level.
‡ Contract initially takes effect in the 2026–27 season.

=== Trades ===
| Date | Details | | Ref |
|---|---|---|---|
| June 27, 2025 | To Ottawa Senators TBL 1st-round pick in 2025 (#23 overall); 3rd-round pick in 2025 (#67 overall) | To Nashville Predators 1st-round pick in 2025 (#21 overall) | |
| June 28, 2025 | To Vegas Golden Knights TBL 2nd-round pick in 2025 (#55 overall) | To Nashville Predators 2nd-round pick in 2025 (#58 overall); 4th-round pick in 2025 (#122 overall) | |
| June 28, 2025 | To Edmonton Oilers 5th-round pick in 2025 (#131 overall) | To Nashville Predators 5th-round pick in 2026 | |
| June 28, 2025 | To Utah Mammoth COL 6th-round pick in 2025 (#182 overall) | To Nashville Predators 6th-round pick in 2026 | |
| June 30, 2025 | To Vegas Golden Knights Jeremy Lauzon; Colton Sissons* | To Nashville Predators Nicolas Hague conditional 2nd-round pick in 2027 or 3rd-round pick in 2027 | |
| December 12, 2025 | To Edmonton Oilers Spencer Stastney | To Nashville Predators 3rd-round pick in 2027 | |
| March 3, 2026 | To Minnesota Wild Michael McCarron | To Nashville Predators 2nd-round pick in 2028 | |
| March 3, 2026 | To Vegas Golden Knights Cole Smith | To Nashville Predators Christoffer Sedoff; 3rd-round pick in 2028 | |
| March 4, 2026 | To Colorado Avalanche Nick Blankenburg | To Nashville Predators 5th-round pick in 2027 | |
| March 5, 2026 | To Dallas Stars Michael Bunting | To Nashville Predators SEA 3rd-round pick in 2026 | |
| March 12, 2026 | To Boston Bruins Navrin Mutter | To Nashville Predators Dalton Bancroft; Massimo Rizzo | |
| June 16, 2026 | To Colorado Avalanche Magnus Chrona; 3rd-round pick in 2026; COL 3rd-round pick in 2027 | To Nashville Predators Ross Colton; Isak Posch | |
| June 24, 2026 | To Colorado Avalanche Zachary L'Heureux; Fedor Svechkov | To Nashville Predators Chase Bradley; Jack Drury; 3rd-round pick in 2029 | |
| June 26, 2026 | To Carolina Hurricanes 2nd-round pick in 2026 (#42 overall); MIN 2nd-round pick in 2026 (#57 overall) | To Nashville Predators 1st-round pick in 2026 (#31 overall) | |
| June 27, 2026 | To Pittsburgh Penguins CAR 5th-round pick in 2026 (#160 overall) | To Nashville Predators 5th-round pick in 2028 | |
| June 27, 2026 | To Vancouver Canucks OTT 5th-round pick in 2027 | To Nashville Predators 6th-round pick in 2026 (#161 overall) | |

=== Players acquired ===
| Date | Player | Former team | Term | Via | Ref |
|---|---|---|---|---|---|
| July 1, 2025 | Nick Perbix | Tampa Bay Lightning | 2-year | Free agency | |
| October 1, 2025 | Tyson Jost | Carolina Hurricanes | | Waivers | |

=== Players lost ===
| Date | Player | New team | Term | Via | Ref |
|---|---|---|---|---|---|
| July 2, 2025 | Marc Del Gaizo | Montreal Canadiens | 1-year | Free agency | |

=== Signings ===
| Date | Player | Term | Ref |
|---|---|---|---|
| August 20, 2025 | Brady Martin | 3-year† | |
| October 3, 2025 | Luke Evangelista | 2-year | |

== Milestones ==
Regular season
| Player | Milestone | Reached |
|---|---|---|
| Matthew Wood (ice hockey) | 1st goal in an NHL game | October 30th, 2025 |
| Roman Josi | 1000th NHL game | January 24th, 2026 |
| Roman Josi | 200th NHL goal | January 31st, 2026 |
| Ryan Ufko | 1st goal in an NHL game | March 10th, 2026 |

== Draft picks ==
Below are the Nashville Predators' selections at the 2025 NHL entry draft, which was held on June 27 and 28, 2025, at the Peacock Theater in Los Angeles.

| Round | # | Player | Pos | Nationality | Team (league) |
|---|---|---|---|---|---|
| 1 | 6 | Brady Martin | C | Canada | Sault Ste. Marie Greyhounds (OHL) |
| 1 | 21 (Note: The Ottawa Senators' first-round pick went to the Nashville Predators as the result of a trade on June 27, 2025, that sent Tampa Bay's first-round pick and a third-round pick both in 2025 (23rd and 67th overall) to Ottawa in exchange for this pick.) | Cameron Reid | D | Canada | Kitchener Rangers (OHL) |
| 1 | 26 (Note: The Vegas Golden Knights' first-round pick went to the Nashville Predators as the result of a trade on August 23, 2024, that sent Yaroslav Askarov, Nolan Burke and a third-round pick in 2025 to San Jose in exchange for Magnus Chrona, David Edstrom and this pick (being conditional at the time of the trade). The condition – Nashville will receive a first-round pick in 2025 if the Golden Knights' first-round in 2025 is outside of the top ten selections – was converted when Vegas qualified for the 2025 Stanley Cup playoffs on April 1, 2025.) | Ryker Lee | RW | United States | Madison Capitals (USHL) |
| 2 | 35 | Jacob Rombach | D | United States | Lincoln Stars (USHL) |
| 2 | 58 (Note: The Vegas Golden Knights' second-round pick went to the Nashville Predators as the result of a trade on June 28, 2025, that sent Tampa Bay's second-round pick in 2025 (55th overall) to Vegas in exchange for a fourth-round pick in 2025 (122nd overall) and this pick.) | Jack Ivankovic | G | Canada | Brampton Steelheads (OHL) |
| 4 | 122 (Note: The Vegas Golden Knights' fourth-round pick went to the Nashville Predators as the result of a trade on June 28, 2025, that sent Tampa Bay's second-round pick in 2025 (55th overall) to Vegas in exchange for a second-round pick in 2025 (58th overall) and this pick.) | Alex Huang | D | Canada | Chicoutimi Saugeneens (QMJHL) |
| 6 | 163 | Daniel Nieminen | D | Finland | Lahti Pelicans (Liiga) |
