= Dominik Shine =

American ice hockey player (born 1993)

- Born: April 18, 1993 (age 33) Pinckney, Michigan, U.S.
- Height: 5 ft 11 in (180 cm)
- Weight: 174 lb (79 kg; 12 st 6 lb)
- Position: Right wing
- Shoots: Right
- NHL team (P) Cur. team: Detroit Red Wings; Grand Rapids Griffins (AHL)
- NHL draft: Undrafted
- Playing career: 2017–present

Dominik Shine (born April 18, 1993) is an American professional ice hockey player for the Grand Rapids Griffins of the American Hockey League (AHL) while under contract to the Detroit Red Wings of the National Hockey League (NHL).

== Early life ==
Shine was born on April 18, 1993, to parents Scott and Marcy Shine. His family lived in Ypsilanti, Michigan before settling in Pinckney, where Shine began playing competitive youth hockey. He won two consecutive AAA National Championships with the Little Caesars bantam team and Compuware midget minor team. While attending Lincoln Southeast High School, Shine played four seasons with the Lincoln Stars of the United States Hockey League (USHL). During the 2011–12 and 2012–13 season, he served as team captain.

== Playing career ==
=== Collegiate ===
Shine joined the Northern Michigan Wildcats for his freshman season during their 2013–14 campaign. He played in all 38 games and recorded 17 points for fifth on the team. On November 23, 2013, Shine and fellow rookie Sami Salminen recorded their first two collegiate goals in a 3–0 win over the Alabama-Huntsville Chargers. Shine returned to the Wildcats for his sophomore season where he opened the season with a three-game goal streak. He finished the 2014–15 season third on the team in points, tied for third in goals, and fourth in assists.

In his junior year, Shine was named an alternate captain alongside Shane Sooth and Brock Maschmeyer. While serving in this role, he became the third Wildcat to earn GLI All-Tournament Team Honors since Dan Ruoho in 1992 and Roger Trudeau in 1998. By January, Shine ranked fifth in the Western Collegiate Hockey Association (WCHA) in goals, tied for 11th in points, and tied for second in game-winning goals. As a result, he earned a spot on the fan ballot for the 2016 Hobey Baker award. At the conclusion of the season, Shine was invited to participate in the Edmonton Oilers orientation camp from July 2 to 7.

Shine returned to the Wildcats for his senior season, where he continued his offensive output. From December to January, Shine tied for the NCAA lead with eight goals and 16th in the nation in goal-scoring. As a result of his play, he was named the Western Collegiate Hockey Association Offensive Player of the Week for the second time in his career. A few months later, Shine became the first WCHA skater to reach the 20-goal plateau during the season and one of only 15 in the Division I ranks. As a result, he was named to the All-WCHA Team.

=== Professional ===
Shine concluded his collegiate career on March 14, 2017, by signing an amateur tryout agreement with the Grand Rapids Griffins in the American Hockey League (AHL) for the remainder of the 2016–17 season. He appeared in eight regular-season games with the Griffins, recording three assists and seven penalty minutes. He remained with the team as they qualified for the Calder Cup Finals but did not appear in a game as they beat the Syracuse Crunch for their second championship in five seasons. Following this, Shine signed a standard player's contract for the 2017–18 season.

In his first professional season with the Griffins, Shine was invited to the Detroit Red Wings' 2017 prospects tournament where he finished with four shots on goal and was plus-1. Following the tournament, Shine was one of 74 players invited to their Development Camp but was reassigned to the Griffins prior to the start of the season. During the first three months of the season, Shine recorded two goals in 23 games and was subsequently scratched 11 times. Despite his slow start, he concluded the season with 16 points in 58 regular-season games and played in five postseason contests. Following this, Shine signed a one-year contract extension to remain with the Griffins.

In his second full professional season with the Griffins, Shine tied with teammates Turner Elson and Dominic Turgeon for most games played during the regular season with 72. He played in his 100th career AHL game during a 4–3 shootout win against the Cleveland Monsters on December 29. Upon concluding his second season with 11 points and 53 penalty minutes, Shine signed another one-year contract.

In February 2020, Shine, who played roller hockey with the Detroit Bordercats at Joe Dumars Fieldhouse, was drafted in the fifth round of the National Roller Hockey League Draft. On April 18, Shine signed a one-year contract extension with the Griffins for the 2020–21 season. During the season, he was forced to transition to defence due to injuries and COVID-19 protocols. In three games in which he played defense, Shine was a plus five. In March 2021, Shine became the third Griffins player during the 2020–21 season to play in his 200th game for the organization.

During the 2024–25 season, in the midst of a career year offensively in his ninth season with the Griffins, Shine was signed to a two-year league minimum NHL contract with the Detroit Red Wings on January 27, 2025. He earned his first NHL point on February 1, 2025. Shine had the secondary assist on a goal scored by Dylan Larkin against the Calgary Flames. After four games with Detroit, he was reassigned to Grand Rapids on February 5.

On October 9, 2025, as part of their inaugural Upcoming Games preview, it was announced that the Griffins had named Shine as the team's captain, the 19th in franchise history, succeeding Josiah Didier in the role. He was also just the 3rd, along with Brian Lashoff and Travis Richards to reach the 10-season mark with the club, and, along with scoring a goal in the team's win over Toronto on December 7, 2025, played his 500th game for the franchise, becoming only the 3rd player to reach that mark in Griffins' history.

On March 8, 2026, Shine scored his first NHL goal for the Detroit Red Wings in a game against the New Jersey Devils, becoming the oldest player to score his first NHL goal since Evgeny Medvedev in 2015 and the fifth-oldest Red Wings player in franchise history to score his first NHL goal.

== Career statistics ==
			Regular season					Playoffs
Season	Team	League	GP	G	A	Pts	PIM	GP	G	A	Pts	PIM
2009–10	Lincoln Stars	USHL	54	15	14	29	165	—	—	—	—	—
2010–11	Lincoln Stars	USHL	52	12	16	28	158	2	0	0	0	0
2011–12	Lincoln Stars	USHL	32	11	21	32	60	8	1	1	2	18
2012–13	Lincoln Stars	USHL	50	26	19	45	120	5	1	2	3	4
2013–14	Northern Michigan U.	WCHA	38	6	11	17	43	—	—	—	—	—
2014–15	Northern Michigan U.	WCHA	26	7	13	20	24	—	—	—	—	—
2015–16	Northern Michigan U.	WCHA	34	15	15	30	88	—	—	—	—	—
2016–17	Northern Michigan U.	WCHA	33	20	10	30	30	—	—	—	—	—
2016–17	Grand Rapids Griffins	AHL	8	0	3	3	7	—	—	—	—	—
2017–18	Grand Rapids Griffins	AHL	58	8	8	16	54	5	0	0	0	2
2018–19	Grand Rapids Griffins	AHL	72	6	5	11	53	5	1	1	2	2
2019–20	Grand Rapids Griffins	AHL	50	4	10	14	57	—	—	—	—	—
2020–21	Grand Rapids Griffins	AHL	29	2	2	4	39	—	—	—	—	—
2021–22	Grand Rapids Griffins	AHL	71	17	15	32	141	—	—	—	—	—
2022–23	Grand Rapids Griffins	AHL	69	14	11	25	53	—	—	—	—	—
2023–24	Grand Rapids Griffins	AHL	65	10	23	33	73	9	2	3	5	8
2024–25	Grand Rapids Griffins	AHL	61	14	32	46	76	3	1	2	3	6
2024–25	Detroit Red Wings	NHL	9	0	1	1	15	—	—	—	—	—
2025–26	Grand Rapids Griffins	AHL	40	21	17	38	41	8	0	1	1	6
2025–26	Detroit Red Wings	NHL	18	3	0	3	7	—	—	—	—	—
NHL totals			27	3	1	4	22	—	—	—	—	—
