= 2025–26 Chicago Blackhawks season =

National Hockey League season

2025–26 Chicago Blackhawks
- Division: 8th Central
- Conference: 15th Western
- 2025–26 record: 29–39–14
- Home record: 14–19–8
- Road record: 15–20–6
- Goals for: 213
- Goals against: 275

Team information
- General manager: Kyle Davidson
- Coach: Jeff Blashill
- Captain: Nick Foligno (Oct. 7 – Mar. 6); Vacant (Mar. 6 – Apr. 15)
- Alternate captains: Connor Bedard (Mar. 6 – Apr. 15); Tyler Bertuzzi (Mar. 6 – Apr. 15); Jason Dickinson (Oct. 7 –Mar. 4); Connor Murphy (Oct. 7 – Mar. 2)
- Arena: United Center
- Minor league affiliates: Rockford IceHogs (AHL); Indy Fuel (ECHL)

Team leaders
- Goals: Tyler Bertuzzi (32)
- Assists: Connor Bedard (43)
- Points: Connor Bedard (73)
- Penalty minutes: Louis Crevier (61)
- Plus/minus: Nick Foligno (+2)
- Wins: Spencer Knight (18)
- Goals against average: Drew Commesso (2.31)

The 2025–26 Chicago Blackhawks season was the 100th season (99th season of play) for the National Hockey League (NHL) franchise that was established on September 25, 1926.

On April 2, 2026, the Blackhawks were eliminated from playoff contention for the sixth straight season following their loss to the Edmonton Oilers.

== Standings ==
=== Divisional standings ===
Central Division
Pos	Team	GP	W	L	OTL	RW	GF	GA	GD	Pts
1	p – Colorado Avalanche	82	55	16	11	48	302	203	+99	121
2	x – Dallas Stars	82	50	20	12	38	279	226	+53	112
3	x – Minnesota Wild	82	46	24	12	31	272	240	+32	104
4	x – Utah Mammoth	82	43	33	6	33	268	240	+28	92
5	St. Louis Blues	82	37	33	12	33	231	258	−27	86
6	Nashville Predators	82	38	34	10	28	247	269	−22	86
7	Winnipeg Jets	82	35	35	12	28	231	260	−29	82
8	Chicago Blackhawks	82	29	39	14	21	213	275	−62	72

Source: National Hockey League
Rules for classification: 1) Fewer number of games played (GP, only during regular season); 2) Greater number of regulation wins (RW); 3) Greater number of wins in regulation and overtime, excluding shootout wins (ROW); 4) Greater number of total wins, including shootouts (W); 5) Greater number of points earned in head-to-head play; if teams played an uneven number of head-to-head games, the result of the first game on the home ice of the team with the extra home game is discarded; 6) Greater goal differential (GD); 7) Greater number of goals scored (GF)
p – Clinched Presidents' Trophy; x – Clinched playoff spot

=== Conference standings ===
Western Conference Wild Card
Pos	Div	Team	GP	W	L	OTL	RW	GF	GA	GD	Pts
1	CE	x – Utah Mammoth	82	43	33	6	33	268	240	+28	92
2	PA	x – Los Angeles Kings	82	35	27	20	22	225	247	−22	90
3	CE	St. Louis Blues	82	37	33	12	33	231	258	−27	86
4	CE	Nashville Predators	82	38	34	10	28	247	269	−22	86
5	PA	San Jose Sharks	82	39	35	8	27	251	292	−41	86
6	CE	Winnipeg Jets	82	35	35	12	28	231	260	−29	82
7	PA	Seattle Kraken	82	34	37	11	26	226	263	−37	79
8	PA	Calgary Flames	82	34	39	9	27	212	259	−47	77
9	CE	Chicago Blackhawks	82	29	39	14	22	213	275	−62	72
10	PA	Vancouver Canucks	82	25	49	8	15	216	316	−100	58

Source: National Hockey League
Rules for classification: 1) Fewer number of games played (GP, only during regular season); 2) Greater number of regulation wins (RW); 3) Greater number of wins in regulation and overtime, excluding shootout wins (ROW); 4) Greater number of total wins, including shootouts (W); 5) Greater number of points earned in head-to-head play; if teams played an uneven number of head-to-head games, the result of the first game on the home ice of the team with the extra home game is discarded; 6) Greater goal differential (GD); 7) Greater number of goals scored (GF)
x – Clinched playoff spot

== Schedule and results ==
=== Preseason ===
The Blackhawks preseason schedule was released on July 10, 2025.

2025 preseason game log: 2–4–0 (Home: 0–3–0; Road: 2–1–0)

#	Date	Visitor	Score	Home	OT	Decision	Arena	Attendance	Record	Recap
1	September 23	Chicago	2–3	Detroit		Soderblom	Little Caesars Arena	15,503	0–1–0	Recap
2	September 27	Chicago	4–2	St. Louis		Knight	Enterprise Center	18,096	1–1–0	Recap
3	September 28	Chicago	4–1	Minnesota		Commesso	Grand Casino Arena	17,808	2–1–0	Recap
4	September 30	Detroit	3–1	Chicago		Knight	United Center	9,691	2–2–0	Recap
5	October 3	Minnesota	3–2	Chicago		Knight	United Center	9,569	2–3–0	Recap
6	October 4	St. Louis	4–0	Chicago		Soderblom	United Center	10,069	2–4–0	Recap

Legend:

Win Loss OT/SO Loss

=== Regular season ===
The Blackhawks regular season schedule was released on July 16, 2025.

2025–26 game log
October: 5–4–2 (Home: 3–2–1; Road: 2–2–1)

#	Date	Visitor	Score	Home	OT	Decision	Attendance	Record	Points	Recap
1	October 7	Chicago	2–3	Florida		Knight	19,655	0–1–0	0	
2	October 9	Chicago	3–4	Boston	OT	Soderblom	17,850	0–1–1	1	
3	October 11	Montreal	3–2	Chicago		Knight	19,344	0–2–1	1	
4	October 13	Utah	1–3	Chicago		Knight	15,203	1–2–1	3	
5	October 15	Chicago	8–3	St. Louis		Soderblom	17,249	2–2–1	5	
6	October 17	Vancouver	3–2	Chicago	SO	Knight	18,306	2–2–2	6	
7	October 19	Anaheim	1–2	Chicago	OT	Knight	16,262	3–2–2	8	
8	October 23	Chicago	3–2	Tampa Bay		Knight	19,092	4–2–2	10	
9	October 26	Los Angeles	3–1	Chicago		Soderblom	16,620	4–3–2	10	
10	October 28	Ottawa	3–7	Chicago		Knight	15,100	5–3–2	12	
11	October 30	Chicago	3–6	Winnipeg		Knight	13,682	5–4–2	12	

November: 6–5–3 (Home: 3–3–2; Road: 3–2–1)

#	Date	Visitor	Score	Home	OT	Decision	Attendance	Record	Points	Recap
12	November 1	Chicago	2–3	Edmonton	OT	Knight	18,347	5–4–3	13	
13	November 3	Chicago	1–3	Seattle		Soderblom	17,151	5–5–3	13	
14	November 5	Chicago	5–2	Vancouver		Knight	19,002	6–5–3	15	
15	November 7	Chicago	4–0	Calgary		Knight	17,425	7–5–3	17	
16	November 9	Chicago	5–1	Detroit		Soderblom	19,515	8–5–3	19	
17	November 12	New Jersey	4–3	Chicago	OT	Knight	17,268	8–5–4	20	
18	November 15	Toronto	2–3	Chicago		Knight	20,489	9–5–4	22	
19	November 18	Calgary	2–5	Chicago		Soderblom	17,518	10–5–4	24	
20	November 20	Seattle	3–2	Chicago		Knight	18,170	10–6–4	24	
21	November 21	Chicago	3–9	Buffalo		Soderblom	17,058	10–7–4	24	
22	November 23	Colorado	1–0	Chicago		Knight	20,441	10–8–4	24	
23	November 26	Minnesota	4–3	Chicago	OT	Knight	18,933	10–8–5	25	
24	November 28	Nashville	4–3	Chicago		Soderblom	19,755	10–9–5	25	
25	November 30	Anaheim	3–5	Chicago		Knight	19,912	11–9–5	27	

December: 3–8–2 (Home: 1–3–1; Road: 2–5–1)

#	Date	Visitor	Score	Home	OT	Decision	Attendance	Record	Points	Recap
26	December 2	Chicago	3–4	Vegas	SO	Knight	17,944	11–9–6	28	
27	December 4	Chicago	2–1	Los Angeles		Knight	16,225	12–9–6	30	
28	December 6	Chicago	0–6	Los Angeles		Knight	18,145	12–10–6	30	
29	December 7	Chicago	1–7	Anaheim		Soderblom	15,511	12–11–6	30	
30	December 10	NY Rangers	0–3	Chicago		Knight	19,709	13–11–6	32	
31	December 12	Chicago	2–3	St. Louis		Knight	18,096	13–12–6	32	
32	December 13	Detroit	4–0	Chicago		Soderblom	20,751	13–13–6	32	
33	December 16	Chicago	2–3	Toronto		Knight	18,568	13–14–6	32	
34	December 18	Chicago	1–4	Montreal		Knight	20,962	13–15–6	32	
35	December 20	Chicago	4–6	Ottawa		Soderblom	18,254	13–16–6	32	
36	December 23	Philadelphia	3–1	Chicago		Knight	20,256	13–17–6	32	
37	December 27	Chicago	4–3	Dallas	SO	Soderblom	18,532	14–17–6	34	
38	December 28	Pittsburgh	7–3	Chicago		Knight	20,173	14–18–6	34	
39	December 30	NY Islanders	3–2	Chicago	SO	Knight	19,603	14–18–7	35	

January: 7–7–2 (Home: 4–6–1; Road: 3–1–1)

#	Date	Visitor	Score	Home	OT	Decision	Attendance	Record	Points	Recap
40	January 1	Dallas	3–4	Chicago		Knight	18,801	15–18–7	37	
41	January 3	Chicago	3–2	Washington	SO	Knight	18,347	16–18–7	39	
42	January 4	Vegas	2–3	Chicago	OT	Soderblom	18,266	17–18–7	41	
43	January 7	St. Louis	3–7	Chicago		Knight	17,244	18–18–7	43	
44	January 9	Washington	5–1	Chicago		Commesso	19,917	18–19–7	43	
45	January 10	Chicago	3–0	Nashville		Commesso	17,297	19–19–7	45	
46	January 12	Edmonton	4–1	Chicago		Knight	17,783	19–20–7	45	
47	January 15	Calgary	3–1	Chicago		Knight	16,652	19–21–7	45	
48	January 17	Boston	5–2	Chicago		Soderblom	20,388	19–22–7	45	
49	January 19	Winnipeg	0–2	Chicago		Knight	19,894	20–22–7	47	
50	January 22	Chicago	4–3	Carolina	SO	Knight	18,323	21–22–7	49	
51	January 23	Tampa Bay	2–1	Chicago	SO	Soderblom	18,841	21–22–8	50	
52	January 25	Florida	5–1	Chicago		Knight	19,313	21–23–8	50	
53	January 27	Chicago	3–4	Minnesota	SO	Knight	18,011	21–23–9	51	
54	January 29	Chicago	2–6	Pittsburgh		Soderblom	16,715	21–24–9	51	
55	January 30	Columbus	4–2	Chicago		Knight	20,247	21–25–9	51	

February: 1–3–0 (Home: 1–0–0; Road: 0–3–0)

#	Date	Visitor	Score	Home	OT	Decision	Attendance	Record	Points	Recap
56	February 2	San Jose	3–6	Chicago		Knight	20,130	22–25–9	53	
57	February 4	Chicago	0–4	Columbus		Knight	18,575	22–26–9	53	
58	February 26	Chicago	2–4	Nashville		Knight	17,224	22–27–9	53	
59	February 28	Chicago	1–3	Colorado		Knight	18,152	22–28–9	53	

March: 5–6–5 (Home: 1–2–3; Road: 4–4–2)

#	Date	Visitor	Score	Home	OT	Decision	Attendance	Record	Points	Recap
60	March 1	Chicago	4–0	Utah		Soderblom	12,478	23–28–9	55	
61	March 3	Chicago	2–3	Winnipeg	OT	Knight	13,929	23–28–10	56	
62	March 6	Vancouver	6–3	Chicago		Soderblom	20,580	23–29–10	56	
63	March 8	Chicago	3–4	Dallas	OT	Soderblom	18,532	23–29–11	57	
64	March 9	Utah	2–3	Chicago	OT	Commesso	18,320	24–29–11	59	
65	March 12	Chicago	3–2	Utah	OT	Knight	12,478	25–29–11	61	
66	March 14	Chicago	0–4	Vegas		Knight	18,128	25–30–11	61	
67	March 17	Minnesota	4–3	Chicago	OT	Knight	20,668	25–30–12	62	
68	March 19	Chicago	2–1	Minnesota		Knight	19,086	26–30–12	64	
69	March 20	Colorado	4–1	Chicago		Soderblom	20,539	26–31–12	64	
70	March 22	Nashville	3–2	Chicago	OT	Knight	20,553	26–31–13	65	
71	March 24	Chicago	4–3	NY Islanders		Soderblom	17,255	27–31–13	67	
72	March 26	Chicago	1–5	Philadelphia		Knight	18,969	27–32–13	67	
73	March 27	Chicago	1–6	NY Rangers		Soderblom	18,006	27–33–13	67	
74	March 29	Chicago	3–5	New Jersey		Knight	16,514	27–34–13	67	
75	March 31	Winnipeg	4–3	Chicago	OT	Knight	18,726	27–34–14	68	

April: 2–5–0 (Home: 1–3–0; Road: 1–2–0)

#	Date	Visitor	Score	Home	OT	Decision	Attendance	Record	Points	Recap
76	April 2	Chicago	1–3	Edmonton		Knight	18,347	27–35–14	68	
77	April 4	Chicago	4–2	Seattle		Soderblom	17,151	28–35–14	70	
78	April 6	Chicago	2–3	San Jose		Knight	16,204	28–36–14	70	
79	April 9	Carolina	7–2	Chicago		Knight	18,039	28–37–14	70	
80	April 11	St. Louis	5–3	Chicago		Soderblom	20,761	28–38–14	70	
81	April 13	Buffalo	5–1	Chicago		Knight	17,056	28–39–14	70	
82	April 15	San Jose	2–5	Chicago		Knight	20,397	29–39–14	72	

Legend: Win (2 points) Loss (0 points) Overtime/shootout loss (1 point)

== Awards and honours ==
=== Awards ===
Regular season
Player	Award	Awarded

=== Milestone ===
Regular season
Player	Milestone	Reached
Anton Frondell	1st Career NHL Game	March 24, 2026

=== Records ===
Regular season
Player	Record	Reached

== Transactions ==
The Blackhawks have been involved in the following transactions during the 2025–26 season.

=== Key ===
† Contract is entry-level.
‡ Contract initially takes effect in the 2026–27 season.

=== Trades ===
Date	Details		Ref
June 28, 2025	To Vancouver Canucks Ilya Safonov	To Chicago Blackhawks future considerations	
July 1, 2025	To Buffalo Sabres 6th-round pick in 2026	To Chicago Blackhawks Sam Lafferty	
March 2, 2026	To Edmonton Oilers Connor Murphy* (50% retention)	To Chicago Blackhawks 2nd-round pick in 2028	
March 4, 2026	To Edmonton Oilers Colton Dach; Jason Dickinson* (50% retention)	To Chicago Blackhawks Andrew Mangiapane conditional 1st-round pick in 2027 or 1st-round pick in 2028	
March 6, 2026	To New York Rangers Aidan Thompson	To Chicago Blackhawks Derrick Pouliot	
March 6, 2026	To Minnesota Wild Nick Foligno	To Chicago Blackhawks future considerations	
June 1, 2026	To Tampa Bay Lightning Jack Pridham	To Chicago Blackhawks 3rd-round pick in 2027	

==== Pick-only trades ====
June 27, 2025	To Carolina Hurricanes 2nd-round pick in 2025 (#34 overall); DAL 2nd-round pick in 2025 (#62 overall); 5th-round pick in 2027	To Chicago Blackhawks 1st-round pick in 2025 (#29 overall)
June 28, 2025	To Florida Panthers BOS 7th-round pick in 2025 (#197 overall)	To Chicago Blackhawks 7th-round pick in 2026

=== Players acquired ===
Date	Player	Former team	Term	Via	Ref
July 1, 2025	Dominic Toninato	Winnipeg Jets	2-year	Free agency	
October 5, 2025	Matt Grzelcyk	Pittsburgh Penguins	1-year	Free agency	

=== Player lost ===
Date	Player	New team	Term	Via	Ref
July 1, 2025	Philipp Kurashev	San Jose Sharks	1-year	Free agency	
July 1, 2025	Jonathan Toews	Winnipeg Jets	1-year	Free agency	
July 2, 2025	Cole Guttman	Los Angeles Kings	2-year	Free agency	

=== Signings ===
Date	Player	Term	Ref
July 15, 2025	Anton Frondell	3-year†	
July 16, 2025	Stanislav Berezhnoy	2-year†	
July 17, 2025	Louis Crevier	2-year	
July 26, 2025	Arvid Soderblom	2-year	
August 21, 2025	Frank Nazar	7-year	
September 13, 2025	Spencer Knight	3-year‡	
September 17, 2025	Wyatt Kaiser	2-year	

==== Key ====
† Contract is entry-level.

‡ Contract takes effect in the 2026–27 season.

== Draft picks ==
Below are the Chicago Blackhawks' selections at the 2025 NHL entry draft, which was held on June 27th and 28th, 2025, at the Peacock Theater in Los Angeles, California.

Round	#	Player	Pos	Nationality	College/Junior/Club team	League
1	3	Anton Frondell	C	Sweden	Djurgårdens IF	HockeyAllsvenskan
1	25	Vaclav Nestrasil	RW	Czech Republic	Muskegon Lumberjacks	USHL
1	29	Mason West	C	United States	Edina Hornets	USHS-MN
3	66	Nathan Behm	RW	Canada	Kamloops Blazers	WHL
4	98	Julius Sumpf	C	Germany	Moncton Wildcats	QMJHL
4	107	Parker Holmes	LW	Canada	Brantford Bulldogs	OHL
6	162	Ashton Cumby	D	Canada	Seattle Thunderbirds	WHL
7	194	Ilya Kanarsky	G	Russia	AKM Tula	MHL
