= 2025–26 St. Louis Blues season =

National Hockey League season

2025–26 St. Louis Blues
- Division: 5th Central
- Conference: 9th Western
- 2025–26 record: 37–33–12
- Home record: 20–14–7
- Road record: 17–19–5
- Goals for: 231
- Goals against: 258

Team information
- General manager: Doug Armstrong
- Coach: Jim Montgomery
- Captain: Brayden Schenn (Oct. 9 – Mar. 6); Vacant (Mar. 6 – Apr. 16)
- Alternate captains: Justin Faulk (Oct. 9 – Mar. 6); Jake Neighbours (Mar. 6 – Apr. 16); Colton Parayko; Robert Thomas
- Minor league affiliates: Springfield Thunderbirds (AHL); Florida Everblades (ECHL)

Team leaders
- Goals: Robert Thomas (22)
- Assists: Robert Thomas (36)
- Points: Robert Thomas (58)
- Penalty minutes: Tyler Tucker (81)
- Plus/minus: Robert Thomas (+18)
- Wins: Joel Hofer (22)
- Goals against average: Joel Hofer (2.59)

The 2025–26 St. Louis Blues season was the 59th season for the National Hockey League (NHL) franchise that was established in 1967.

On April 11, 2026, the Blues were eliminated from playoff contention for the first time since the 2023–24 season following a Los Angeles Kings 1–0 win against the Edmonton Oilers.

== Standings ==
=== Divisional standings ===
Central Division
Pos	Team	GP	W	L	OTL	RW	GF	GA	GD	Pts
1	p – Colorado Avalanche	82	55	16	11	48	302	203	+99	121
2	x – Dallas Stars	82	50	20	12	38	279	226	+53	112
3	x – Minnesota Wild	82	46	24	12	31	272	240	+32	104
4	x – Utah Mammoth	82	43	33	6	33	268	240	+28	92
5	St. Louis Blues	82	37	33	12	33	231	258	−27	86
6	Nashville Predators	82	38	34	10	28	247	269	−22	86
7	Winnipeg Jets	82	35	35	12	28	231	260	−29	82
8	Chicago Blackhawks	82	29	39	14	21	213	275	−62	72

Source: National Hockey League
Rules for classification: 1) Fewer number of games played (GP, only during regular season); 2) Greater number of regulation wins (RW); 3) Greater number of wins in regulation and overtime, excluding shootout wins (ROW); 4) Greater number of total wins, including shootouts (W); 5) Greater number of points earned in head-to-head play; if teams played an uneven number of head-to-head games, the result of the first game on the home ice of the team with the extra home game is discarded; 6) Greater goal differential (GD); 7) Greater number of goals scored (GF)
p – Clinched Presidents' Trophy; x – Clinched playoff spot

=== Conference standings ===
Western Conference Wild Card
Pos	Div	Team	GP	W	L	OTL	RW	GF	GA	GD	Pts
1	CE	x – Utah Mammoth	82	43	33	6	33	268	240	+28	92
2	PA	x – Los Angeles Kings	82	35	27	20	22	225	247	−22	90
3	CE	St. Louis Blues	82	37	33	12	33	231	258	−27	86
4	CE	Nashville Predators	82	38	34	10	28	247	269	−22	86
5	PA	San Jose Sharks	82	39	35	8	27	251	292	−41	86
6	CE	Winnipeg Jets	82	35	35	12	28	231	260	−29	82
7	PA	Seattle Kraken	82	34	37	11	26	226	263	−37	79
8	PA	Calgary Flames	82	34	39	9	27	212	259	−47	77
9	CE	Chicago Blackhawks	82	29	39	14	22	213	275	−62	72
10	PA	Vancouver Canucks	82	25	49	8	15	216	316	−100	58

Source: National Hockey League
Rules for classification: 1) Fewer number of games played (GP, only during regular season); 2) Greater number of regulation wins (RW); 3) Greater number of wins in regulation and overtime, excluding shootout wins (ROW); 4) Greater number of total wins, including shootouts (W); 5) Greater number of points earned in head-to-head play; if teams played an uneven number of head-to-head games, the result of the first game on the home ice of the team with the extra home game is discarded; 6) Greater goal differential (GD); 7) Greater number of goals scored (GF)
x – Clinched playoff spot

== Schedule and results ==
=== Preseason ===
The Blues preseason schedule was released on July 14, 2025.

2025 preseason game log: 2–3–1 (home: 2–2–0; road: 1–1–1)
#	Date	Visitor	Score	Home	OT	Decision	Location	Attendance	Record	Recap
1	September 20	St. Louis	1–2	Dallas	SO	Ellis	American Airlines Center	15,789	0–0–1
2	September 21	St. Louis	1–4	Columbus		Hofer	Nationwide Arena	12,066	0–1–1
3	September 27	Chicago	4–2	St. Louis		Cranley	Enterprise Center	18,096	0–2–1
4	September 30	Dallas	5–3	St. Louis		Hofer	Enterprise Center	16,292	0–3–1
5	October 2	Ottawa	1–7	St. Louis		Binnington	Enterprise Center	15,922	1–3–1
6	October 4	St. Louis	4–0	Chicago		Hofer	United Center	10,069	2–3–1
Legend: Win Loss OT/SO Loss

=== Regular season ===
The regular season schedule was published on July 16, 2025.

2025–26 game log

October: 3–6–2 (home: 1–4–2; road: 2–2–0)
#	Date	Visitor	Score	Home	OT	Decision	Location	Attendance	Record	Pts	Recap
1	October 9	Minnesota	5–0	St. Louis		Binnington	Enterprise Center	18,096	0–1–0	0
2	October 11	St. Louis	4–2	Calgary		Hofer	Scotiabank Saddledome	17,774	1–1–0	2
3	October 13	St. Louis	5–2	Vancouver		Binnington	Rogers Arena	18,952	2–1–0	4
4	October 15	Chicago	8–3	St. Louis		Hofer	Enterprise Center	17,249	2–2–0	4
5	October 18	Dallas	1–3	St. Louis		Binnington	Enterprise Center	18,096	3–2–0	6
6	October 21	Los Angeles	2–1	St. Louis	OT	Binnington	Enterprise Center	16,710	3–2–1	7
7	October 23	Utah	7–4	St. Louis		Binnington	Enterprise Center	18,096	3–3–1	7
8	October 25	St. Louis	4–6	Detroit		Binnington	Little Caesars Arena	19,515	3–4–1	7
9	October 27	St. Louis	3–6	Pittsburgh		Hofer	PPG Paints Arena	13,303	3–5–1	7
10	October 28	Detroit	5–2	St. Louis		Binnington	Enterprise Center	16,496	3–6–1	7
11	October 30	Vancouver	4–3	St. Louis	SO	Binnington	Enterprise Center	16,848	3–6–2	8

November: 6–4–5 (home: 4–1–2; road: 2–3–3)
#	Date	Visitor	Score	Home	OT	Decision	Location	Attendance	Record	Pts	Recap
12	November 1	St. Louis	2–3	Columbus		Hofer	Nationwide Arena	17,130	3–7–2	8
13	November 3	Edmonton	2–3	St. Louis		Binnington	Enterprise Center	18,096	4–7–2	10
14	November 5	St. Louis	1–6	Washington		Binnington	Capital One Arena	17,437	4–8–2	10
15	November 6	St. Louis	3–0	Buffalo		Hofer	KeyBank Center	16,020	5–8–2	12
16	November 8	Seattle	4–3	St. Louis	OT	Hofer	Enterprise Center	18,096	5–8–3	13
17	November 11	Calgary	2–3	St. Louis		Binnington	Enterprise Center	18,096	6–8–3	15
18	November 14	Philadelphia	6–5	St. Louis	OT	Binnington	Enterprise Center	17,581	6–8–4	16
19	November 15	Vegas	4–1	St. Louis		Hofer	Enterprise Center	18,096	6–9–4	16
20	November 18	St. Louis	2–3	Toronto	OT	Binnington	Scotiabank Arena	18,353	6–9–5	17
21	November 20	St. Louis	2–3	Philadelphia	OT	Hofer	Xfinity Mobile Arena	17,677	6–9–6	18
22	November 22	St. Louis	2–1	NY Islanders		Binnington	UBS Arena	17,255	7–9–6	20
23	November 24	St. Louis	2–3	NY Rangers		Hofer	Madison Square Garden	18,006	7–10–6	20
24	November 26	St. Louis	2–3	New Jersey	OT	Binnington	Prudential Center	16,056	7–10–7	21
25	November 28	Ottawa	3–4	St. Louis		Binnington	Enterprise Center	18,096	8–10–7	23
26	November 29	Utah	0–1	St. Louis		Hofer	Enterprise Center	16,847	9–10–7	25

December: 6–8–1 (home: 3–4–1; road: 3–4–0)
#	Date	Visitor	Score	Home	OT	Decision	Location	Attendance	Record	Pts	Recap
27	December 1	Anaheim	4–1	St. Louis		Binnington	Enterprise Center	16,229	9–11–7	25
28	December 4	St. Louis	2–5	Boston		Binnington	TD Garden	17,850	9–12–7	25
29	December 6	St. Louis	2–1	Ottawa		Hofer	Canadian Tire Centre	16,064	10–12–7	27
30	December 7	St. Louis	4–3	Montreal		Binnington	Bell Centre	20,962	11–12–7	29
31	December 9	Boston	5–2	St. Louis		Hofer	Enterprise Center	18,096	11–13–7	29
32	December 11	St. Louis	2–7	Nashville		Binnington	Bridgestone Arena	17,159	11–14–7	29
33	December 12	Chicago	3–2	St. Louis		Hofer	Enterprise Center	18,096	12–14–7	31
34	December 15	Nashville	5–2	St. Louis		Hofer	Enterprise Center	18,096	12–15–7	31
35	December 17	Winnipeg	0–1	St. Louis		Hofer	Enterprise Center	16,953	13–15–7	33
36	December 18	NY Rangers	2–1	St. Louis	OT	Binnington	Enterprise Center	18,096	13–15–8	34
37	December 20	St. Louis	6–2	Florida		Hofer	Amerant Bank Arena	19,081	14–15–8	36
38	December 22	St. Louis	1–4	Tampa Bay		Binnington	Benchmark International Arena	19,092	14–16–8	36
39	December 27	Nashville	2–3	St. Louis		Hofer	Enterprise Center	18,096	15–16–8	38
40	December 29	Buffalo	4–2	St. Louis		Hofer	Enterprise Center	18,096	15–17–8	38
41	December 31	St. Louis	1–6	Colorado		Binnington	Ball Arena	18,149	15–18–8	38

January: 5–8–1 (home: 5–2–1; road: 0–6–0)
#	Date	Visitor	Score	Home	OT	Decision	Location	Attendance	Record	Pts	Recap
42	January 2	Vegas	3–4	St. Louis		Hofer	Enterprise Center	18,096	16–18–8	40
43	January 3	Montreal	0–2	St. Louis		Binnington	Enterprise Center	18,096	17–18–8	42
44	January 7	St. Louis	3–7	Chicago		Binnington	United Center	17,244	17–19–8	42
45	January 9	St. Louis	2–4	Utah		Hofer	Delta Center	12,478	17–20–8	42
46	January 10	St. Louis	2–4	Vegas		Binnington	T-Mobile Arena	17,955	17–21–8	42
47	January 13	Carolina	0–3	St. Louis		Hofer	Enterprise Center	18,096	18–21–8	44
48	January 16	Tampa Bay	2–3	St. Louis	SO	Hofer	Enterprise Center	18,096	19–21–8	46
49	January 18	St. Louis	0–5	Edmonton		Binnington	Rogers Place	18,347	19–22–8	46
50	January 20	St. Louis	1–3	Winnipeg		Hofer	Canada Life Centre	13,661	19–23–8	46
51	January 23	St. Louis	2–3	Dallas		Binnington	American Airlines Center	18,532	19–24–8	46
52	January 24	Los Angeles	4–5	St. Louis	SO	Hofer	Enterprise Center	17,214	19–24–9	47
53	January 27	Dallas	3–4	St. Louis		Binnington	Enterprise Center	18,096	19–25–9	47
54	January 29	Florida	4–5	St. Louis		Hofer	Enterprise Center	18,096	20–25–9	49
55	January 31	Columbus	5–3	St. Louis		Binnington	Enterprise Center	18,096	20–26–9	49

February: 1–3–0 (home: 1–2–0; road: 0–2–0)
#	Date	Visitor	Score	Home	OT	Decision	Location	Attendance	Record	Pts	Recap
56	February 2	St. Louis	5–6	Nashville		Hofer	Bridgestone Arena	17,159	20–27–9	49
57	February 4	St. Louis	4–5	Dallas		Binnington	American Airlines Center	18,532	20–28–9	49
58	February 26	Seattle	1–5	St. Louis		Hofer	Enterprise Center	18,096	21–28–9	51
59	February 28	New Jersey	3–1	St. Louis		Binnington	Enterprise Center	18,096	21–29–9	51

March: 10–2–2 (home: 4–0–1; road: 6–2–1)
#	Date	Visitor	Score	Home	OT	Decision	Location	Attendance	Record	Pts	Recap
60	March 1	St. Louis	3–1	Minnesota		Hofer	Grand Casino Arena	19,121	22–29–9	53
61	March 4	St. Louis	3–2	Seattle		Hofer	Climate Pledge Arena	17,151	23–29–9	55
62	March 6	St. Louis	3–2	San Jose	OT	Binnington	SAP Center	17,435	24–29–9	57
63	March 8	St. Louis	4–0	Anaheim		Hofer	Honda Center	16,214	25–29–9	59
64	March 10	NY Islanders	4–3	St. Louis	OT	Hofer	Enterprise Center	18,096	25–29–10	60
65	March 12	St. Louis	3–1	Carolina		Binnington	Lenovo Center	18,562	26–29–10	62
66	March 13	Edmonton	2–3	St. Louis	OT	Hofer	Enterprise Center	18,096	27–29–10	64
67	March 15	St. Louis	2–3	Winnipeg		Binnington	Canada Life Centre	14,082	27–30–10	64
68	March 18	St. Louis	1–2	Calgary	SO	Hofer	Scotiabank Saddledome	16,898	27–30–11	65
69	March 21	St. Louis	3–1	Vancouver		Binnington	Rogers Arena	18,001	28–30–11	67
70	March 24	Washington	0–3	St. Louis		Hofer	Enterprise Center	18,096	29–30–11	69
71	March 26	San Jose	2–1	St. Louis	OT	Hofer	Enterprise Center	18,096	30–30–11	71
72	March 28	Toronto	1–5	St. Louis		Binnington	Enterprise Center	18,096	31–30–11	73
73	March 30	St. Louis	4–5	San Jose		Hofer	SAP Center	17,435	31–31–11	73

April: 6–2–1 (home: 2–2–0; road: 4–0–1)
#	Date	Visitor	Score	Home	OT	Decision	Location	Attendance	Record	Pts	Recap
74	April 1	St. Louis	1–2	Los Angeles	OT	Binnington	Crypto.com Arena	14,188	31–31–12	74
75	April 3	St. Louis	6–2	Anaheim		Hofer	Honda Center	14,010	32–31–12	76
76	April 5	St. Louis	3–2	Colorado		Hofer	Ball Arena	18,101	33–31–12	78
77	April 7	Colorado	3–1	St. Louis		Hofer	Enterprise Center	18,096	33–32–12	78
78	April 9	Winnipeg	3–2	St. Louis		Binnington	Enterprise Center	18,096	33–33–12	78
79	April 11	St. Louis	5–3	Chicago		Hofer	United Center	20,761	34–33–12	80
80	April 13	Minnesota	3–6	St. Louis		Hofer	Enterprise Center	18,096	35–33–12	82
81	April 14	Pittsburgh	5–7	St. Louis		Binnington	Enterprise Center	18,096	36–33–12	84
82	April 16	St. Louis	5–3	Utah		Hofer	Delta Center	12,478	37–33–12	86

Legend: Win (2 points) Loss (0 points) Overtime/shootout loss (1 point)

== Players statistics ==
=== Skaters ===
Regular season
Player	GP	G	A	Pts	+/−	PIM
Robert Thomas	64	25	39	64	+22	24
Dylan Holloway	59	22	29	51	+13	20
Jimmy Snuggerud	70	21	30	51	+16	18
Pavel Buchnevich	81	20	28	48	−10	26
Jordan Kyrou	72	18	28	46	−5	8
Jake Neighbours	69	15	21	36	−7	43
Philip Broberg	81	6	28	34	+14	16
Justin Faulk^{‡}	61	11	21	32	−3	32
Cam Fowler	82	4	26	30	−11	14
Pius Suter	64	13	16	29	+13	20
Brayden Schenn^{‡}	61	12	16	28	−23	49
Dalibor Dvorsky	71	12	9	21	−6	26
Colton Parayko	77	4	14	18	−6	23
Oskar Sundqvist	52	5	12	17	−18	26
Tyler Tucker	69	3	14	17	−4	81
Jonatan Berggren^{†}	36	6	10	16	−2	6
Logan Mailloux	67	5	8	13	−10	48
Nick Perbix	79	3	10	13	−14	20
Nathan Walker	46	4	7	11	−9	28
Alexey Toropchenko	65	4	7	11	−11	28
Mathieu Joseph^{‡}	39	2	9	11	−5	4
Ryan Ufko	18	2	9	11	0	6
Otto Stenberg	32	3	7	10	+3	5
Nick Bjugstad^{‡}	35	6	1	7	−7	25
Theo Lindstein	17	2	2	4	+6	6
Robby Fabbri^{‡}	15	1	3	4	−3	12
Matthew Kessel	29	2	1	3	+1	10
Jonathan Drouin^{†}	9	1	2	3	−2	0
Justin Holl	9	1	1	2	+5	6
Hugh McGing	3	1	1	2	0	0
Jack Finley^{†}	22	0	2	2	0	17
Matt Luff	5	1	0	1	−2	0
Alexandre Texier^{‡}	8	0	1	1	0	2
Hunter Skinner	1	0	0	0	+1	0
Aleksanteri Kaskimaki	5	0	0	0	−6	0

=== Goaltenders ===
Regular season
Player	GP	GS	TOI	W	L	OT	GA	GAA	SA	SV%	SO	G	A	PIM
Joel Hofer	46	43	2624:39	24	13	5	114	2.61	1250	.910	6	0	0	4
Jordan Binnington	41	39	2307:48	13	20	7	128	3.33	1010	.873	1	0	2	4

^{†}Denotes player spent time with another team before joining the Blues. Stats reflect time with the Blues only.
^{‡}Denotes player was traded mid-season. Stats reflect time with the Blues only.
Bold/italics denotes franchise record.

== Transactions ==
The Blues have been involved in the following transactions during the 2025–26 season.

Key:

† Contract is entry-level.
‡ Contract initially takes effect in the 2026–27 season.

=== Trades ===
Date	Details		Ref
July 1, 2025	To Montreal Canadiens Zachary Bolduc	To St. Louis Blues Logan Mailloux	
November 3, 2025	To Washington Capitals Corey Schueneman	To St. Louis Blues Calle Rosen	
December 2, 2025	To Los Angeles Nikita Alexandrov	To St. Louis Blues Akil Thomas	
February 4, 2026	To New Jersey Devils Nick Bjugstad	To St. Louis Blues Thomas Bordeleau conditional DAL 4th-round pick in 2026 or NJD 4th-round pick in 2026 or WPG 4th-round pick in 2026	
February 24, 2026	To New York Islanders Matt Luff	To St. Louis Blues Julien Gauthier	
March 6, 2026	To Detroit Red Wings Justin Faulk	To St. Louis Blues Dmitri Buchelnikov; Justin Holl; 1st-round pick in 2026; SJS 3rd-round pick in 2026	
March 6, 2026	To New York Islanders Brayden Schenn	To St. Louis Blues Jonathan Drouin; Marcus Gidlof; COL 1st-round pick in 2026; NJD 3rd-round pick in 2026	
June 23, 2026	To Washington Capitals Jordan Kyrou	To St. Louis Blues Connor McMichael; Milton Gastrin; 1st-round pick in 2026	

=== Players acquired ===
Date	Player	Former team	Term	Via	Ref
July 1, 2025	Nick Bjugstad	Utah Mammoth	2-year	Free agency	
July 2, 2025	Pius Suter	Vancouver Canucks	2-year	Free agency	
October 8, 2025	Georgi Romanov	San Jose Sharks	1-year	Free agency	
December 10, 2025	Robby Fabbri	Anaheim Ducks	1-year	Free agency	
December 16, 2025	Jonatan Berggren	Detroit Red Wings		Waivers	
February 7, 2026	Jack Finley	Tampa Bay Lightning		Waivers	

=== Players lost ===
Date	Player	New team	Term	Via	Ref
July 1, 2025	Radek Faksa	Dallas Stars	3-year	Free agency	
July 1, 2025	Mackenzie MacEachern	Vancouver Canucks	2-year	Free agency	
July 3, 2025	Nick Leddy	San Jose Sharks		Waivers	
October 6, 2025	Colten Ellis	Buffalo Sabres		Waivers	
November 23, 2025	Alexandre Texier			Contract termination	
March 2, 2026	Robby Fabbri	Minnesota Wild	Waivers		

=== Signings ===
Date	Player	Term	Ref
June 28, 2025	Joel Hofer	2-year	
July 1, 2025	Matt Luff	1-year	
September 10, 2025	Justin Carbonneau	3-year†	
September 10, 2025	Nikita Susuev	3-year†	
September 17, 2025	Nathan Walker	2-year‡	
September 27, 2025	Cam Fowler	3-year‡	
March 23, 2026	Felix Trudeau	2-year†‡	

== Draft picks ==
Below are the St. Louis Blues' selections at the 2025 NHL entry draft, which was held on June 27 and 28, 2025, at the Peacock Theater in Los Angeles.

Round	#	Player	Pos	Nationality	Team (league)
1	19	Justin Carbonneau	RW	Canada	Blainville-Boisbriand Armada (QMJHL)
5	147	Mikhail Fyodorov	RW	Russia	Stalnye Lisy (MHL)
6	179	Love Harenstam	G	Sweden	Skelleftea AIK J20 (J20 Nationell)
