= 2025–26 Dallas Stars season =

National Hockey League season

2025–26 Dallas Stars
- Division: 2nd Central
- Conference: 2nd Western
- 2025–26 record: 50–20–12
- Home record: 26–11–4
- Road record: 24–9–8
- Goals for: 279
- Goals against: 226

Team information
- General manager: Jim Nill
- Coach: Glen Gulutzan
- Captain: Jamie Benn
- Alternate captains: Miro Heiskanen; Roope Hintz; Esa Lindell; Tyler Seguin
- Arena: American Airlines Center
- Minor league affiliates: Texas Stars (AHL); Idaho Steelheads (ECHL)

Team leaders
- Goals: Wyatt Johnston; Jason Robertson (44)
- Assists: Miro Heiskanen; Mikko Rantanen (54)
- Points: Jason Robertson (94)
- Penalty minutes: Mikko Rantanen (93)
- Plus/minus: Esa Lindell (+29)
- Wins: Jake Oettinger (34)
- Goals against average: Casey DeSmith (2.34)

The 2025–26 Dallas Stars season was the 59th season for the National Hockey League (NHL) franchise that was established on June 5, 1967, and the 33rd season since the franchise relocated from Minnesota prior to the start of the 1993–94 season.

On March 22, 2026, the Stars clinched a playoff spot for the fifth straight season and seventh in the last eight seasons following the Utah Mammoth defeating the Los Angeles Kings. They faced the Minnesota Wild in the first round, where they lost in six games, failing to reach the conference finals for the first time since the 2021–22 season.

== Standings ==
=== Divisional standings ===
Central Division
Pos	Team	GP	W	L	OTL	RW	GF	GA	GD	Pts
1	p – Colorado Avalanche	82	55	16	11	48	302	203	+99	121
2	x – Dallas Stars	82	50	20	12	38	279	226	+53	112
3	x – Minnesota Wild	82	46	24	12	31	272	240	+32	104
4	x – Utah Mammoth	82	43	33	6	33	268	240	+28	92
5	St. Louis Blues	82	37	33	12	33	231	258	−27	86
6	Nashville Predators	82	38	34	10	28	247	269	−22	86
7	Winnipeg Jets	82	35	35	12	28	231	260	−29	82
8	Chicago Blackhawks	82	29	39	14	21	213	275	−62	72

Source: National Hockey League
Rules for classification: 1) Fewer number of games played (GP, only during regular season); 2) Greater number of regulation wins (RW); 3) Greater number of wins in regulation and overtime, excluding shootout wins (ROW); 4) Greater number of total wins, including shootouts (W); 5) Greater number of points earned in head-to-head play; if teams played an uneven number of head-to-head games, the result of the first game on the home ice of the team with the extra home game is discarded; 6) Greater goal differential (GD); 7) Greater number of goals scored (GF)
p – Clinched Presidents' Trophy; x – Clinched playoff spot

=== Conference standings ===
Western Conference Wild Card
Pos	Div	Team	GP	W	L	OTL	RW	GF	GA	GD	Pts
1	CE	x – Utah Mammoth	82	43	33	6	33	268	240	+28	92
2	PA	x – Los Angeles Kings	82	35	27	20	22	225	247	−22	90
3	CE	St. Louis Blues	82	37	33	12	33	231	258	−27	86
4	CE	Nashville Predators	82	38	34	10	28	247	269	−22	86
5	PA	San Jose Sharks	82	39	35	8	27	251	292	−41	86
6	CE	Winnipeg Jets	82	35	35	12	28	231	260	−29	82
7	PA	Seattle Kraken	82	34	37	11	26	226	263	−37	79
8	PA	Calgary Flames	82	34	39	9	27	212	259	−47	77
9	CE	Chicago Blackhawks	82	29	39	14	22	213	275	−62	72
10	PA	Vancouver Canucks	82	25	49	8	15	216	316	−100	58

Source: National Hockey League
Rules for classification: 1) Fewer number of games played (GP, only during regular season); 2) Greater number of regulation wins (RW); 3) Greater number of wins in regulation and overtime, excluding shootout wins (ROW); 4) Greater number of total wins, including shootouts (W); 5) Greater number of points earned in head-to-head play; if teams played an uneven number of head-to-head games, the result of the first game on the home ice of the team with the extra home game is discarded; 6) Greater goal differential (GD); 7) Greater number of goals scored (GF)
x – Clinched playoff spot

== Schedule and results ==
=== Preseason ===
The Stars preseason schedule was released on July 14, 2025.

2025 preseason game log: 5–1–0 (Home: 3–0–0; Road: 2–1–0)

#	Date	Visitor	Score	Home	OT	Decision	Location	Attendance	Record
1	September 20	St. Louis	1–2	Dallas	SO	Bibeau	American Airlines Center	15,789	1–0–0
2	September 23	Minnesota	2–3	Dallas	OT	Oettinger	American Airlines Center	14,514	2–0–0
3	September 25	Dallas	5–2	Minnesota		DeSmith	Grand Casino Arena	16,755	3–0–0
4	September 27	Dallas	1–4	Colorado		Poirier	Ball Arena	15,389	3–1–0
5	September 30	Dallas	5–3	St. Louis		DeSmith	Enterprise Center	16,292	4–1–0
6	October 4	Colorado	2–3	Dallas		Oettinger	American Airlines Center	16,376	5–1–0

Legend:

Win Loss OT/SO Loss

=== Regular season ===
The Stars regular season schedule was released on July 16, 2025.

2025–26 game log
(Home: 27–11–4 = 58 Points; Away: 22–9–8 = 52 Points)
October: 6–3–2 (Home: 3–2–1; Road: 3–1–1 = 14 Points)

#	Date	Visitor	Score	Home	OT	Decision	Location	Attendance	Record	Points	Recap
1	October 9	Dallas	5–4	Winnipeg		Oettinger	Canada Life Centre	14,917	1–0–0	2	
2	October 11	Dallas	5–4	Colorado	SO	Oettinger	Ball Arena	18,129	2–0–0	4	
3	October 14	Minnesota	2–5	Dallas		Oettinger	American Airlines Center	18,532	3–0–0	6	
4	October 16	Vancouver	5–3	Dallas		DeSmith	American Airlines Center	18,532	3–1–0	6	
5	October 18	Dallas	1–3	St. Louis		Oettinger	Enterprise Center	18,096	3–2–0	6	
6	October 21	Columbus	5–1	Dallas		Oettinger	American Airlines Center	18,532	3–3–0	6	
7	October 23	Los Angeles	3–2	Dallas	OT	Oettinger	American Airlines Center	18,532	3–3–1	7	
8	October 25	Carolina	2–3	Dallas		Oettinger	American Airlines Center	18,532	4–3–1	9	
9	October 26	Dallas	3–2	Nashville		DeSmith	Bridgestone Arena	17,159	5–3–1	11	
10	October 28	Washington	0–1	Dallas		Oettinger	American Airlines Center	18,532	6–3–1	13	
11	October 30	Dallas	1–2	Tampa Bay	OT	Oettinger	Benchmark International Arena	19,092	6–3–2	14	

November: 11–2–2 (Home: 5–2–0; Road: 6–0–2 = 24 Points)

#	Date	Visitor	Score	Home	OT	Decision	Location	Attendance	Record	Points	Recap
12	November 1	Dallas	3–4	Florida	SO	DeSmith	Amerant Bank Arena	19,386	6–3–3	15	
13	November 4	Edmonton	3–4	Dallas	SO	DeSmith	American Airlines Center	18,532	7–3–3	17	
14	November 6	Anaheim	7–5	Dallas		Oettinger	American Airlines Center	18,532	7–4–3	17	
15	November 8	Dallas	5–4	Nashville		Oettinger	Bridgestone Arena	17,159	8–4–3	19	
16	November 9	Seattle	1–2	Dallas		DeSmith	American Airlines Center	18,532	9–4–3	21	
17	November 11	Dallas	3–2	Ottawa	OT	Oettinger	Canadian Tire Centre	16,542	10–4–3	23	
18	November 13	Dallas	7–0	Montreal		DeSmith	Bell Centre	20,962	11–4–3	25	
19	November 15	Philadelphia	1–5	Dallas		Oettinger	American Airlines Center	18,532	12–4–3	27	
20	November 18	NY Islanders	3–2	Dallas		Oettinger	American Airlines Center	18,532	12–5–3	27	
21	November 20	Dallas	4–2	Vancouver		Oettinger	Rogers Arena	18,703	13–5–3	29	
22	November 22	Dallas	2–3	Calgary	SO	DeSmith	Scotiabank Saddledome	17,566	13–5–4	30	
23	November 25	Dallas	8–3	Edmonton		Oettinger	Rogers Place	18,347	14–5–4	32	
24	November 26	Dallas	2–3	Seattle		DeSmith	Climate Pledge Arena	17,151	15–5–4	34	
25	November 28	Utah	3–4	Dallas		Oettinger	American Airlines Center	18,532	16–5–4	36	
26	November 30	Ottawa	1–6	Dallas		DeSmith	American Airlines Center	18,532	17–5–4	38	

December: 8–3–3 (Home: 4–2–1; Road: 4–1–2 = 19 Points)

#	Date	Visitor	Score	Home	OT	Decision	Location	Attendance	Record	Points	Recap
27	December 2	Dallas	2–3	NY Rangers	OT	DeSmith	Madison Square Garden	16,950	17–5–5	39	
28	December 3	Dallas	3–0	New Jersey		Oettinger	Prudential Center	15,805	18–5–5	41	
29	December 5	San Jose	1–4	Dallas		Oettinger	American Airlines Center	18,532	19–5–5	43	
30	December 7	Pittsburgh	2–3	Dallas	SO	Oettinger	American Airlines Center	18,532	20–5–5	45	
31	December 9	Dallas	4–3	Winnipeg		DeSmith	Canada Life Centre	13,675	21–5–5	47	
32	December 11	Dallas	2–5	Minnesota		Oettinger	Grand Casino Arena	17,109	21–6–5	47	
33	December 13	Florida	4–0	Dallas		Oettinger	American Airlines Center	18,532	21–7–5	47	
34	December 15	Los Angeles	1–4	Dallas		DeSmith	American Airlines Center	18,532	22–7–5	49	
35	December 18	Dallas	5–3	San Jose		Oettinger	SAP Center	15,808	23–7–5	51	
36	December 19	Dallas	8–3	Anaheim		DeSmith	Honda Center	14,262	24–7–5	53	
37	December 21	Toronto	1–5	Dallas		Oettinger	American Airlines Center	18,532	25–7–5	55	
38	December 23	Dallas	3–4	Detroit	OT	DeSmith	Little Caesars Arena	19,515	25–7–6	56	
39	December 27	Chicago	4–3	Dallas	SO	Oettinger	American Airlines Center	18,532	25–7–7	57	
40	December 31	Buffalo	4–1	Dallas		DeSmith	American Airlines Center	18,532	25–8–7	57	

January: 7–6–2 (Home: 2–1–1; Road: 5–5–1 = 16 Points)

#	Date	Visitor	Score	Home	OT	Decision	Location	Attendance	Record	Points	Recap
41	January 1	Dallas	3–4	Chicago		Oettinger	United Center	18,801	25–9–7	57	
42	January 4	Montreal	4–3	Dallas	OT	Oettinger	American Airlines Center	18,532	25–9–8	58	
43	January 6	Dallas	3–6	Carolina		Oettinger	Lenovo Center	18,299	25–10–8	58	
44	January 7	Dallas	4–1	Washington		DeSmith	Capital One Arena	18,347	26–10–8	60	
45	January 10	Dallas	4–5	San Jose	OT	DeSmith	SAP Center	17,435	26–10–9	61	
46	January 12	Dallas	3–1	Los Angeles		Oettinger	Crypto.com Arena	17,088	27–10–9	63	
47	January 13	Dallas	1–3	Anaheim		DeSmith	Honda Center	16,214	27–11–9	63	
48	January 15	Dallas	1–2	Utah		Oettinger	Delta Center	12,478	27–12–9	63	
49	January 18	Tampa Bay	4–1	Dallas		Oettinger	American Airlines Center	18,532	27–13–9	63	
50	January 20	Boston	2–6	Dallas		Oettinger	American Airlines Center	18,532	28–13–9	65	
51	January 22	Dallas	0–1	Columbus		DeSmith	Nationwide Arena	14,372	28–14–9	65	
52	January 23	St. Louis	2–3	Dallas		Oettinger	American Airlines Center	18,532	29–14–9	67	
53	January 27	Dallas	4–3	St. Louis		Oettinger	Enterprise Center	18,096	30–14–9	69	
54	January 29	Dallas	5–4	Vegas	SO	Oettinger	T-Mobile Arena	17,888	31–14–9	71	
55	January 31	Dallas	3–2	Utah		DeSmith	Delta Center	12,478	32–14–9	73	

February: 4–0–0 (Home: 4–0–0; Road: 0–0–0 = 8 Points)

#	Date	Visitor	Score	Home	OT	Decision	Location	Attendance	Record	Points	Recap
56	February 2	Winnipeg	3–4	Dallas	OT	Oettinger	American Airlines Center	18,532	33–14–9	75	
57	February 4	St. Louis	4–5	Dallas		Oettinger	American Airlines Center	18,532	34–14–9	77	
58	February 25	Seattle	1–4	Dallas		DeSmith	American Airlines Center	18,532	35–14–9	79	
59	February 28	Nashville	2–3	Dallas	OT	Oettinger	American Airlines Center	18,532	36–14–9	81	

March: 8–5–3 (Home: 4–3–1; Road: 4–2–2 = 19 Points)

#	Date	Visitor	Score	Home	OT	Decision	Location	Attendance	Record	Points	Recap
60	March 2	Dallas	6–1	Vancouver		Oettinger	Rogers Arena	18,222	37–14–9	83	
61	March 3	Dallas	6–1	Calgary		DeSmith	Scotiabank Saddledome	16,725	38–14–9	85	
62	March 6	Colorado	5–4	Dallas	SO	Oettinger	American Airlines Center	18,532	38–14–10	86	
63	March 8	Chicago	3–4	Dallas	OT	DeSmith	American Airlines Center	18,532	39–14–10	88	
64	March 10	Vegas	1–2	Dallas		Oettinger	American Airlines Center	18,532	40–14–10	90	
65	March 12	Edmonton	2–7	Dallas		Oettinger	American Airlines Center	18,532	41–14–10	92	
66	March 14	Detroit	2–3	Dallas	OT	Oettinger	American Airlines Center	18,532	42–14–10	94	
67	March 16	Utah	6–3	Dallas		DeSmith	American Airlines Center	18,532	42–15–10	94	
68	March 18	Dallas	2–1	Colorado	SO	Oettinger	Ball Arena	18,146	43–15–10	96	
69	March 21	Dallas	1–2	Minnesota	OT	Oettinger	Grand Casino Arena	19,229	43–15–11	97	
70	March 22	Vegas	3–2	Dallas		DeSmith	American Airlines Center	18,532	43–16–11	97	
71	March 24	New Jersey	6–4	Dallas		DeSmith	American Airlines Center	18,532	43–17–11	97	
72	March 26	Dallas	1–2	NY Islanders		Oettinger	UBS Arena	17,255	43–18–11	97	
73	March 28	Dallas	6–3	Pittsburgh		Oettinger	PPG Paints Arena	18,367	44–18–11	99	
74	March 29	Dallas	1–2	Philadelphia	OT	DeSmith	Xfinity Mobile Arena	19,120	44–18–12	100	
75	March 31	Dallas	3–6	Boston		Oettinger	TD Garden	17,850	44–19–12	100	

April: 6–1–0 (Home: 4–1–0; Road: 2–0–0 = 12 Points)

#	Date	Visitor	Score	Home	OT	Decision	Location	Attendance	Record	Points	Recap
76	April 2	Winnipeg	0–3	Dallas		Oettinger	American Airlines Center	18,532	45–19–12	102	
77	April 4	Colorado	2–0	Dallas		DeSmith	American Airlines Center	18,532	45–20–12	102	
78	April 7	Calgary	3–4	Dallas	OT	Oettinger	American Airlines Center	18,532	46–20–12	104	
79	April 9	Minnesota	4–5	Dallas		Oettinger	American Airlines Center	18,532	47–20–12	106	
80	April 11	NY Rangers	0–2	Dallas		Oettinger	American Airlines Center	18,532	48–20–12	108	
81	April 13	Dallas	6–5	Toronto		DeSmith	Scotiabank Arena	18,460	49–20–12	110	
82	April 15	Dallas	4–3	Buffalo	SO	Oettinger	KeyBank Center	19,070	50–20–12	112	

Win Loss OT/SO Loss

=== Playoffs ===
2026 Stanley Cup playoffs
Western Conference first round vs. (C3) Minnesota Wild: Minnesota won 4–2

#	Date	Visitor	Score	Home	OT	Decision	Attendance	Series	Recap
1	April 18	Minnesota	6–1	Dallas		Oettinger	18,532	0–1	
2	April 20	Minnesota	2–4	Dallas		Oettinger	18,532	1–1	
3	April 22	Dallas	4–3	Minnesota	2OT	Oettinger	19,244	2–1	
4	April 25	Dallas	2–3	Minnesota	OT	Oettinger	19,274	2–2	
5	April 28	Minnesota	4–2	Dallas		Oettinger	18,532	2–3	
6	April 30	Dallas	2–5	Minnesota		Oettinger	19,273	2–4	

Legend: Win Loss

== Player statistics ==
Updated as of April 30, 2026

=== Skaters ===
Regular season
Player	GP	G	A	Pts	+/–	PIM
Jason Robertson	82	45	51	96	+22	32
Wyatt Johnston	82	45	41	86	−5	32
Mikko Rantanen	64	22	55	77	0	93
Miro Heiskanen	77	9	54	63	+9	30
Matt Duchene	57	16	29	45	−3	8
Roope Hintz	53	15	29	44	+16	18
Mavrik Bourque	82	20	21	41	+6	22
Jamie Benn	60	15	21	36	+8	53
Thomas Harley	70	6	30	36	+3	26
Sam Steel	73	12	21	33	+3	24
Esa Lindell	82	6	26	32	+30	20
Justin Hryckowian	81	14	16	30	+1	43
Tyler Seguin	27	7	10	17	+10	2
Radek Faksa	58	2	15	17	+2	18
Colin Blackwell	70	4	11	15	−2	40
Oskar Back	72	5	7	12	+10	10
Nils Lundkvist	52	3	8	11	+12	16
Alex Petrovic	54	2	8	10	+2	47
Ilya Lyubushkin	53	1	8	9	+1	40
Adam Erne	45	6	2	8	+1	19
Lian Bichsel	50	4	4	8	+6	37
Nathan Bastian	36	6	1	7	+4	21
Arttu Hyry	20	3	2	5	+1	2
Kyle Capobianco	33	2	3	5	+1	8
Vladislav Kolyachonok^{‡}	11	1	2	3	+3	4
Tyler Myers^{†}	16	0	3	3	+2	12
Michael Bunting^{†}	13	1	1	2	−7	4
Cameron Hughes	3	1	0	1	+2	0

Playoffs
Player	GP	G	A	Pts	+/–	PIM
Matt Duchene	6	2	7	9	–4	4
Jason Robertson	6	5	3	8	–2	2
Mikko Rantanen	6	1	6	7	–8	12
Wyatt Johnston	6	4	2	6	–6	2
Miro Heiskanen	6	2	4	6	–9	2
Nils Lundkvist	4	0	2	2	+1	2
Mavrik Bourque	6	1	0	1	–1	4
Esa Lindell	6	0	1	1	–7	6
Michael Bunting	1	0	1	1	+1	0
Oskar Back	6	0	1	1	–1	0
Ilya Lyubushkin	2	0	1	1	0	0
Justin Hryckowian	6	0	1	1	–4	0
Jamie Benn	6	0	0	0	–7	8
Tyler Myers	5	0	0	0	–5	4
Alex Petrovic	1	0	0	0	0	0
Colin Blackwell	6	0	0	0	–2	0
Radek Faksa	6	0	0	0	–3	4
Adam Erne	1	0	0	0	–1	0
Sam Steel	6	0	0	0	–7	2
Thomas Harley	6	0	0	0	–6	2
Lian Bichsel	6	0	0	0	0	4
Arttu Hyry	4	0	0	0	–2	0

=== Goaltenders ===
Regular season
Player	GP	GS	TOI	W	L	OT	GA	GAA	SA	SV%	SO	G	A	PIM
Jake Oettinger	54	54	3,194:11	35	12	6	138	2.59	1,372	.899	4	0	1	0
Casey DeSmith	30	28	1,755:00	15	8	6	71	2.43	760	.907	1	0	0	2

Playoffs
Player	GP	GS	TOI	W	L	GA	GAA	SA	SV%	SO	G	A	PIM
Jake Oettinger	6	6	403:13	2	4	19	2.83	178	.893	0	0	0	0

^{†}Denotes player spent time with another team before joining the Stars. Stats reflect time with the Stars only.
^{‡}Denotes player was traded mid-season. Stats reflect time with the Stars only.
Bold/italics denotes franchise record.

== Transactions ==
The Stars have been involved in the following transactions during the 2025–26 season.

Key:

† Contract is entry-level.
‡ Contract initially takes effect in the 2026-27 season.

=== Trades ===
Date	Details		Ref
July 10, 2025	To Pittsburgh Penguins Matt Dumba; 2nd-round pick in 2028	To Dallas Stars Vladislav Kolyachonok	
October 30, 2025	To Philadelphia Flyers Christian Kyrou	To Dallas Stars Samu Tuomaala	
February 2, 2026	To Calgary Flames Gavin White	To Dallas Stars Jeremie Poirier	
March 4, 2026	To Dallas Stars Tyler Myers* (50% retention)	To Vancouver Canucks 2nd-round pick in 2027 4th-round pick in 2029	

=== Players acquired ===
Date	Player	Former team	Term	Via	Ref
July 1, 2025	Radek Faksa	St. Louis Blues	3-year	Free agency	
August 9, 2025	Nathan Bastian	New Jersey Devils	1-year	Free agency	
September 23, 2025	Jaxon Fuder	Red Deer Rebels (WHL)	3-year†	Free agency	
October 7, 2025	Adam Erne	Edmonton Oilers	1-year	Free agency	

=== Players lost ===
Date	Player	New team	Term	Via	Ref
July 1, 2025	Matej Blumel	Boston Bruins	1-year	Free agency	
July 1, 2025	Cody Ceci	Los Angeles Kings	4-year	Free agency	
July 1, 2025	Evgenii Dadonov	New Jersey Devils	1-year	Free agency	
July 1, 2025	Mikael Granlund	Anaheim Ducks	3-year	Free agency	
November 24, 2025	Brendan Smith	Columbus Blue Jackets	1-year	Free agency	
December 16, 2025	Vladislav Kolyachonok	Boston Bruins		Waivers	

=== Signings ===
Date	Player	Term	Ref
June 19, 2025	Matt Duchene	4-year	
June 20, 2025	Mavrik Bourque	1-year	
June 20, 2025	Nils Lundkvist	1-year	
June 26, 2025	Jamie Benn	1-year	
July 1, 2025	Colin Blackwell	2-year	
July 1, 2025	Niilopekka Muhonen	3-year†	
October 28, 2025	Thomas Harley	8-year‡	
March 18, 2026	Jack Anderson (ice hockey)	2-year†‡	

== Milestones ==
Regular season
Player	Milestone	Reached
Tyler Seguin	1000th NHL Game	October 30, 2025

== Draft picks ==
Below are the Dallas Stars selections at the 2025 NHL entry draft, which was held on June 27 and 28, 2024, at the Peacock Theater in Los Angeles, California.

Round	#	Player	Pos	Nationality	College/Junior/Club	League
2	94	Cameron Schmidt	RW	Canada	Vancouver Giants	WHL
4	126	Brandon Gorzynski	C	United States	Calgary Hitmen	WHL
5	146	Atte Joki	C	Finland	Lukko U20	U20 SM-sarja
5	158	Mans Goos	G	Sweden	Farjestad BK J20	J20 Nationell
6	190	Dawson Sharkey	RW	Canada	Acadie–Bathurst Titan	QMJHL
7	222	Charlie Paquette	RW	Canada	Guelph Storm	OHL
