= 2025–26 Washington Capitals season =

National Hockey League season

2025–26 Washington Capitals
- Division: 4th Metropolitan
- Conference: 9th Eastern
- 2025–26 record: 42–30–9
- Home record: 25–11–5
- Road record: 17–19–4
- Goals for: 261
- Goals against: 243

Team information
- General manager: Chris Patrick
- Coach: Spencer Carbery
- Captain: Alexander Ovechkin
- Alternate captains: John Carlson (Oct. 8 – Mar. 6); Dylan Strome (Mar. 7 – Apr. 14); Tom Wilson
- Arena: Capital One Arena
- Minor league affiliates: Hershey Bears (AHL); South Carolina Stingrays (ECHL)

Team leaders
- Goals: Alexander Ovechkin (32)
- Assists: Dylan Strome (39)
- Points: Alexander Ovechkin (64)
- Penalty minutes: Tom Wilson (117)
- Plus/minus: Aliaksei Protas (+20)
- Wins: Logan Thompson (30)
- Goals against average: Clay Stevenson (2.33)

The 2025–26 Washington Capitals season was the 52nd season (51st season of play) for the National Hockey League (NHL) franchise that was established on June 11, 1974.

On April 13, the Capitals were eliminated from playoff contention for the first time since the 2022–23 season and the third time since the 2006–07 season following a 3–2 shootout win by the Philadelphia Flyers against the Carolina Hurricanes.

== Standings ==
=== Divisional standings ===
Metropolitan Division
Pos	Team	GP	W	L	OTL	RW	GF	GA	GD	Pts
1	z – Carolina Hurricanes	82	53	22	7	39	296	240	+56	113
2	x – Pittsburgh Penguins	82	41	25	16	34	293	268	+25	98
3	x – Philadelphia Flyers	82	43	27	12	27	250	243	+7	98
4	Washington Capitals	82	43	30	9	37	263	244	+19	95
5	Columbus Blue Jackets	82	40	30	12	28	253	253	0	92
6	New York Islanders	82	43	34	5	29	233	241	−8	91
7	New Jersey Devils	82	42	37	3	29	230	254	−24	87
8	New York Rangers	82	34	39	9	25	238	250	−12	77

Source: National Hockey League
Rules for classification: 1) Fewer number of games played (GP, only during regular season); 2) Greater number of regulation wins (RW); 3) Greater number of wins in regulation and overtime, excluding shootout wins (ROW); 4) Greater number of total wins, including shootouts (W); 5) Greater number of points earned in head-to-head play; if teams played an uneven number of head-to-head games, the result of the first game on the home ice of the team with the extra home game is discarded; 6) Greater goal differential (GD); 7) Greater number of goals scored (GF)
x – Clinched playoff spot; z – Clinched conference

=== Conference standings ===
Eastern Conference Wild Card
Pos	Div	Team	GP	W	L	OTL	RW	GF	GA	GD	Pts
1	AT	x – Boston Bruins	82	45	27	10	33	272	250	+22	100
2	AT	x – Ottawa Senators	82	44	27	11	38	278	246	+32	99
3	ME	Washington Capitals	82	43	30	9	37	263	244	+19	95
4	AT	Detroit Red Wings	82	41	31	10	30	241	258	−17	92
5	ME	Columbus Blue Jackets	82	40	30	12	28	253	253	0	92
6	ME	New York Islanders	82	43	34	5	29	233	241	−8	91
7	ME	New Jersey Devils	82	42	37	3	29	230	254	−24	87
8	AT	Florida Panthers	82	40	38	4	32	251	276	−25	84
9	AT	Toronto Maple Leafs	82	32	36	14	23	253	299	−46	78
10	ME	New York Rangers	82	34	39	9	25	238	250	−12	77

Source: National Hockey League
Rules for classification: 1) Fewer number of games played (GP, only during regular season); 2) Greater number of regulation wins (RW); 3) Greater number of wins in regulation and overtime, excluding shootout wins (ROW); 4) Greater number of total wins, including shootouts (W); 5) Greater number of points earned in head-to-head play; if teams played an uneven number of head-to-head games, the result of the first game on the home ice of the team with the extra home game is discarded; 6) Greater goal differential (GD); 7) Greater number of goals scored (GF)
x – Clinched playoff spot

== Schedule and results ==
=== Preseason ===
The preseason schedule was released on July 3, 2025.

2025 preseason game log: 5–1–0 (Home: 2–1–0; Road: 3–0–0)

#	Date	Visitor	Score	Home	OT	Decision	Location	Attendance	Record
1	September 21	Washington	5–2	Boston		Bjorklund	TD Garden	17,850	1–0–0
2^{A}	September 25	Philadelphia	1–5	Washington		Stevenson	Giant Center	10,420	2–0–0
3	September 28	Washington	3–2	New Jersey	SO	Lindgren	Prudential Center	8,341	3–0–0
4	September 30	Washington	4–3	Columbus		Thompson	Nationwide Arena	11,128	4–0–0
5	October 2	Boston	3–1	Washington		Lindgren	Capital One Arena	11,304	4–1–0
6	October 4	Columbus	1–2	Washington		Thompson	Capital One Arena	12,131	5–1–0

Legend

Win Loss OT/SO Loss
^{A} – Game played in Hershey, Pennsylvania

=== Regular season ===
The regular season schedule was released on July 16, 2025.

2025–26 game log
October: 6–5–0 (Home: 3–4–0; Road: 3–1–0)

#	Date	Visitor	Score	Home	OT	Decision	Location	Attendance	Record	Points	Recap
1	October 8	Boston	3–1	Washington		Thompson	Capital One Arena	18,347	0–1–0	0	
2	October 11	Washington	4–2	NY Islanders		Thompson	UBS Arena	17,255	1–1–0	2	
3	October 12	Washington	1–0	NY Rangers		Lindgren	Madison Square Garden	17,479	2–1–0	4	
4	October 14	Tampa Bay	2–3	Washington	OT	Thompson	Capital One Arena	16,948	3–1–0	6	
5	October 17	Minnesota	1–5	Washington		Thompson	Capital One Arena	17,482	4–1–0	8	
6	October 19	Vancouver	4–3	Washington		Lindgren	Capital One Arena	17,018	4–2–0	8	
7	October 21	Seattle	1–4	Washington		Thompson	Capital One Arena	16,578	5–2–0	10	
8	October 24	Washington	5–1	Columbus		Thompson	Nationwide Arena	17,714	6–2–0	12	
9	October 25	Ottawa	7–1	Washington		Lindgren	Capital One Arena	18,347	6–3–0	12	
10	October 28	Washington	0–1	Dallas		Thompson	American Airlines Center	18,532	6–4–0	12	
11	October 31	NY Islanders	3–1	Washington		Thompson	Capital One Arena	16,471	6–5–0	12	

November: 9–4–2 (Home: 6–1–1; Road: 3–3–1)

#	Date	Visitor	Score	Home	OT	Decision	Location	Attendance	Record	Points	Recap
12	November 1	Washington	3–4	Buffalo	SO	Lindgren	KeyBank Center	19,070	6–5–1	13	
13	November 5	St. Louis	1–6	Washington		Thompson	Capital One Arena	17,437	7–5–1	15	
14	November 6	Washington	3–5	Pittsburgh		Lindgren	PPG Paints Arena	18,384	7–6–1	15	
15	November 8	Washington	2–3	Tampa Bay		Thompson	Benchmark International Arena	19,092	7–7–1	15	
16	November 11	Washington	4–1	Carolina		Thompson	Lenovo Center	18,299	8–7–1	17	
17	November 13	Washington	3–6	Florida		Thompson	Amerant Bank Arena	19,650	8–8–1	17	
18	November 15	New Jersey	3–2	Washington	SO	Thompson	Capital One Arena	18,347	8–8–2	18	
19	November 17	Los Angeles	1–2	Washington		Lindgren	Capital One Arena	17,649	9–8–2	20	
20	November 19	Edmonton	4–7	Washington		Thompson	Capital One Arena	17,929	10–8–2	22	
21	November 20	Washington	8–4	Montreal		Lindgren	Bell Centre	20,962	11–8–2	24	
22	November 22	Tampa Bay	5–3	Washington		Thompson	Capital One Arena	18,347	11–9–2	24	
23	November 24	Columbus	1–5	Washington		Thompson	Capital One Arena	17,337	12–9–2	26	
24	November 26	Winnipeg	3–4	Washington		Lindgren	Capital One Arena	18,347	13–9–2	28	
25	November 28	Toronto	2–4	Washington		Thompson	Capital One Arena	18,347	14–9–2	30	
26	November 30	Washington	4–1	NY Islanders		Thompson	UBS Arena	15,648	15–9–2	32	

December: 6–5–3 (Home: 3–2–1; Road: 3–3–2)

#	Date	Visitor	Score	Home	OT	Decision	Location	Attendance	Record	Points	Recap
27	December 2	Washington	3–1	Los Angeles		Thompson	Crypto.com Arena	16,509	16–9–2	34	
28	December 3	Washington	7–1	San Jose		Lindgren	SAP Center	15,466	17–9–2	36	
29	December 5	Washington	3–4	Anaheim	SO	Thompson	Honda Center	16,122	17–9–3	37	
30	December 7	Columbus	0–2	Washington		Thompson	Capital One Arena	17,312	18–9–3	39	
31	December 11	Carolina	3–2	Washington	SO	Thompson	Capital One Arena	18,185	18–9–4	40	
32	December 13	Washington	1–5	Winnipeg		Thompson	Canada Life Centre	14,096	18–10–4	40	
33	December 16	Washington	0–5	Minnesota		Lindgren	Grand Casino Arena	18,044	18–11–4	40	
34	December 18	Toronto	0–4	Washington		Thompson	Capital One Arena	18,347	19–11–4	42	
35	December 20	Detroit	5–2	Washington		Thompson	Capital One Arena	18,347	19–12–4	42	
36	December 21	Washington	2–3	Detroit	OT	Lindgren	Little Caesars Arena	19,515	19–12–5	43	
37	December 23	NY Rangers	7–3	Washington		Thompson	Capital One Arena	18,347	19–13–5	43	
38	December 27	Washington	4–3	New Jersey	OT	Thompson	Prudential Center	16,763	20–13–5	45	
39	December 29	Washington	3–5	Florida		Thompson	Amerant Bank Arena	19,421	20–14–5	45	
40	December 31	NY Rangers	3–6	Washington		Lindgren	Capital One Arena	18,347	21–14–5	47	

January: 6–8–2 (Home: 3–3–1; Road: 3–5–1)

#	Date	Visitor	Score	Home	OT	Decision	Location	Attendance	Record	Points	Recap
41	January 1	Washington	3–4	Ottawa		Thompson	Canadian Tire Centre	18,433	21–15–5	47	
42	January 3	Chicago	3–2	Washington	SO	Thompson	Capital One Arena	18,347	21–15–6	48	
43	January 5	Anaheim	4–7	Washington		Lindgren	Capital One Arena	17,560	22–15–6	50	
44	January 7	Dallas	4–1	Washington		Thompson	Capital One Arena	18,347	22–16–6	50	
45	January 9	Washington	5–1	Chicago		Thompson	United Center	19,917	23–16–6	52	
46	January 11	Washington	2–3	Nashville		Lindgren	Bridgestone Arena	17,159	23–17–6	52	
47	January 13	Montreal	2–3	Washington	OT	Thompson	Capital One Arena	18,347	24–17–6	54	
48	January 15	San Jose	3–2	Washington		Thompson	Capital One Arena	18,347	24–18–6	54	
49	January 17	Florida	5–2	Washington		Thompson	Capital One Arena	18,347	24–19–6	54	
50	January 19	Washington	2–5	Colorado		Lindgren	Ball Arena	18,136	24–20–6	54	
51	January 21	Washington	3–4	Vancouver		Thompson	Rogers Arena	18,556	24–21–6	54	
52	January 23	Washington	3–1	Calgary		Thompson	Scotiabank Saddledome	17,379	25–21–6	56	
53	January 24	Washington	5–6	Edmonton	OT	Lindgren	Rogers Place	18,347	25–21–7	57	
54	January 27	Washington	1–5	Seattle		Thompson	Climate Pledge Arena	17,151	25–22–7	57	
55	January 29	Washington	4–3	Detroit	SO	Lindgren	Little Caesars Arena	19,515	26–22–7	59	
56	January 31	Carolina	3–4	Washington	OT	Stevenson	Capital One Arena	18,347	27–22–7	61	

February: 4–2–0 (Home: 4–0–0; Road: 0–2–0)

#	Date	Visitor	Score	Home	OT	Decision	Location	Attendance	Record	Points	Recap
57	February 2	NY Islanders	1–4	Washington		Stevenson	Capital One Arena	17,545	28–22–7	63	
58	February 3	Washington	2–4	Philadelphia		Stevenson	Xfinity Mobile Arena	19,410	28–23–7	63	
59	February 5	Nashville	2–4	Washington		Thompson	Capital One Arena	18,347	29–23–7	65	
60	February 25	Philadelphia	1–3	Washington		Thompson	Capital One Arena	18,347	30–23–7	67	
61	February 27	Vegas	2–3	Washington		Thompson	Capital One Arena	18,347	31–23–7	69	
62	February 28	Washington	2–6	Montreal		Lindgren	Bell Centre	20,962	31–24–7	69	

March: 7–4–2 (Home: 4–1–2; Road: 3–3–0)

#	Date	Visitor	Score	Home	OT	Decision	Location	Attendance	Record	Points	Recap
63	March 3	Utah	3–2	Washington		Thompson	Capital One Arena	17,387	31–25–7	69	
64	March 7	Washington	1–3	Boston		Thompson	TD Garden	17,850	31–26–7	69	
65	March 9	Calgary	3–7	Washington		Thompson	Capital One Arena	17,724	32–26–7	71	
66	March 11	Washington	1–4	Philadelphia		Thompson	Xfinity Mobile Arena	19,053	32–27–7	71	
67	March 12	Washington	2–1	Buffalo		Lindgren	KeyBank Center	19,070	33–27–7	73	
68	March 14	Boston	3–2	Washington	SO	Thompson	Capital One Arena	18,347	33–27–8	74	
69	March 18	Ottawa	1–4	Washington		Thompson	Capital One Arena	18,347	34–27–8	76	
70	March 20	New Jersey	1–2	Washington		Thompson	Capital One Arena	18,347	35–27–8	78	
71	March 22	Colorado	3–2	Washington	OT	Thompson	Capital One Arena	18,347	35–27–9	79	
72	March 24	Washington	0–3	St. Louis		Thompson	Enterprise Center	18,096	35–28–9	79	
73	March 26	Washington	7–4	Utah		Thompson	Delta Center	12,478	36–28–9	81	
74	March 28	Washington	5–4	Vegas	SO	Thompson	T-Mobile Arena	17,922	37–28–9	83	
75	March 31	Philadelphia	4–6	Washington		Thompson	Capital One Arena	18,347	38–28–9	85	

April: 5–2–0 (Home: 2–0–0; Road: 3–2–0)

#	Date	Visitor	Score	Home	OT	Decision	Location	Attendance	Record	Points	Recap
76	April 2	Washington	3–7	New Jersey		Thompson	Prudential Center	16,057	38–29–9	85	
77	April 4	Buffalo	2–6	Washington		Thompson	Capital One Arena	18,347	39–29–9	87	
78	April 5	Washington	1–8	NY Rangers		Lindgren	Madison Square Garden	17,335	39–30–9	87	
79	April 8	Washington	4–0	Toronto		Thompson	Scotiabank Arena	18,640	40–30–9	89	
80	April 11	Washington	6–3	Pittsburgh		Thompson	PPG Paints Arena	18,410	41–30–9	91	
81	April 12	Pittsburgh	0–3	Washington		Thompson	Capital One Arena	18,347	42–30–9	93	
82	April 14	Washington	2–1	Columbus		Stevenson	Nationwide Arena	18,244	43–30–9	95	

Win (2 points) Loss (0 points) Overtime/shootout loss (1 point)

== Player stats ==
As of game played April 14, 2026

=== Skaters ===
Regular season
Player	GP	G	A	Pts	+/−	PIM
Alexander Ovechkin	82	32	32	64	−5	26
Tom Wilson	72	30	32	62	+15	117
Jakob Chychrun	80	26	34	60	+20	62
Dylan Strome	80	19	39	58	+2	46
Aliaksei Protas	76	25	27	52	+20	20
Connor McMichael	78	14	32	46	+8	30
John Carlson^{‡}	55	10	36	46	+11	26
Ryan Leonard	75	20	25	45	+2	47
Justin Sourdif	78	15	20	35	+17	35
Rasmus Sandin	73	5	24	29	+4	12
Anthony Beauvillier	82	15	13	28	+7	30
Martin Fehervary	81	5	22	27	+15	39
Ethen Frank	62	12	12	24	+8	18
Pierre-Luc Dubois	29	5	14	19	−4	19
Matt Roy	79	2	17	19	+18	12
Nic Dowd^{‡}	55	4	12	16	−6	53
Hendrix Lapierre	74	4	12	16	0	31
Trevor van Riemsdyk	68	3	11	14	+6	18
Cole Hutson	14	3	7	10	−3	8
Brandon Duhaime	82	4	5	9	−2	78
Sonny Milano^{‡}	31	4	4	8	0	4
Declan Chisholm	26	1	6	7	+3	4
Ilya Protas	4	1	3	4	+1	2
Ivan Miroshnichenko	13	2	1	3	+1	2
Timothy Liljegren^{†}	4	0	0	0	0	2
David Kampf^{†}	2	0	0	0	−1	2
Dylan McIlrath	13	0	0	0	−1	10
Brett Leason	6	0	0	0	−2	0
Bogdan Trineyev	2	0	0	0	0	0

=== Goaltenders ===
Regular season
Player	GP	GS	TOI	W	L	OT	GA	GAA	SA	SV%	SO	G	A	PIM
Logan Thompson	58	58	3445:03	31	21	6	140	2.44	1587	.912	4	0	1	0
Charlie Lindgren	21	20	1246:02	9	8	3	73	3.52	602	.879	1	0	1	8
Clay Stevenson	4	4	239:44	3	1	0	8	2.00	101	.921	0	0	0	0

^{†}Denotes player spent time with another team before joining the Capitals. Stats reflect time with the Capitals only.
^{‡}No longer with the Capitals.

== Transactions ==
=== Trades ===
Date	Details		Ref
June 28, 2025	To Ottawa Senators CAR 3rd-round pick in 2025 (#93 overall)	To Washington Capitals FLA 3rd-round pick in 2025 (#96 overall); 7th-round pick in 2027	
June 28, 2025	To Minnesota Wild Chase Priskie; 4th-round pick in 2025	To Washington Capitals Declan Chisholm; 6th-round pick in 2025	
November 3, 2025	To St. Louis Blues Calle Rosen	To Washington Capitals Corey Schueneman	
March 5, 2026	To Vegas Golden Knights Nic Dowd	To Washington Capitals Jesper Vikman; 2nd-round pick in 2029; 3rd-round pick in 2027	
March 6, 2026	To Anaheim Ducks John Carlson	To Washington Capitals Conditional 1st-round pick in 2026; 3rd-round pick in 2027	
March 6, 2026	To Vancouver Canucks 6th-round pick in 2026	To Washington Capitals David Kampf	
March 6, 2026	To San Jose Sharks VGK 4th-round pick in 2026	To Washington Capitals Timothy Liljegren	
March 6, 2026	To Ottawa Senators Graeme Clarke	To Washington Capitals Wyatt Bongiovanni	

=== Players acquired ===
Date	Player	New team	Term	Via	Ref
July 2, 2025	Louie Belpedio	Philadelphia Flyers	2-year	Free agency	
July 2, 2025	Graeme Clarke	Minnesota Wild	1-year	Free agency	
July 2, 2025	Calle Rosen	Colorado Avalanche	1-year	Free agency	
July 7, 2025	Sheldon Rempal	Salavat Yulaev Ufa (KHL)	1-year	Free agency	
October 27, 2025	Brett Leason	Anaheim Ducks	1-year	Free agency	

=== Players lost ===
Date	Player	New team	Term	Via	Ref
June 9, 2025	T.J. Oshie			Retirement	
July 1, 2025	Ethan Bear	New York Islanders	1-year	Free agency	
July 1, 2025	Lars Eller	Ottawa Senators	1-year	Free agency	
July 1, 2025	Taylor Raddysh	New York Rangers	2-year	Free agency	
July 1, 2025	Andrew Mangiapane	Edmonton Oilers	2-year	Free agency	
July 2, 2025	Hunter Shepard	Ottawa Senators	1-year	Free agency	
July 2, 2025	Alexander Alexeyev	Pittsburgh Penguins	1-year	Free agency	
October 16, 2025	Vincent Iorio	San Jose Sharks		Waivers	

== Draft picks ==
Below are the Washington Capitals' selections at the 2025 NHL entry draft, which was held on June 27 and 28, 2025, at the Peacock Theater in Los Angeles, California.

Round	#	Player	Pos	Nationality	College/Junior/Club team (League)
1	27	Lynden Lakovic	RW	Canada	Moose Jaw Warriors (WHL)
2	37	Milton Gastrin	C	Sweden	Modo Hockey (SHL)
3	96	Maxim Schafer	LW	Germany	Eisbären Berlin (DEL)
5	155	Jackson Crowder	C	United States	Chicago Steel (USHL)
6	180	Aron Dahlqvist	D	Sweden	Brynäs J20 (J20 Nationell)
