= 2025–26 Los Angeles Kings season =

National Hockey League season

2025–26 Los Angeles Kings
- Division: 4th Pacific
- Conference: 8th Western
- 2025–26 record: 35–27–20
- Home record: 15–17–9
- Road record: 20–10–11
- Goals for: 225
- Goals against: 247

Team information
- General manager: Ken Holland
- Coach: Jim Hiller (Oct. 7 – Mar. 1); D. J. Smith (interim, Mar. 1 – Apr. 26)
- Captain: Anze Kopitar
- Alternate captains: Mikey Anderson (Dec. – Apr.); Phillip Danault (Oct. – Dec.); Drew Doughty; Adrian Kempe (Dec. – Apr.)
- Arena: Crypto.com Arena
- Minor league affiliates: Ontario Reign (AHL); Greenville Swamp Rabbits (ECHL)

Team leaders
- Goals: Adrian Kempe (32)
- Assists: Adrian Kempe (37)
- Points: Adrian Kempe (69)
- Penalty minutes: Brandt Clarke (61)
- Plus/minus: Anze Kopitar (+17)
- Wins: Darcy Kuemper (19)
- Goals against average: Anton Forsberg (2.74)

The 2025–26 Los Angeles Kings season was the 59th season for the National Hockey League (NHL) franchise that was established on June 5, 1967.

This was the final season of longtime captain Anze Kopitar, who announced before the season that he would retire afterwards.

The Kings broke the NHL record for overtime losses in the regular season with their 19th of the season, a 5–4 shootout loss to the Nashville Predators on April 2, 2026. On April 13, the Kings clinched a playoff berth for the fifth consecutive season after winning against the Seattle Kraken, and following a win by the San Jose Sharks against the Nashville Predators. In the first round of the playoffs, the Kings got swept out by the Colorado Avalanche in four games

== Standings ==
=== Divisional standings ===
Pacific Division
Pos	Team	GP	W	L	OTL	RW	GF	GA	GD	Pts
1	y – Vegas Golden Knights	82	39	26	17	30	265	250	+15	95
2	x – Edmonton Oilers	82	41	30	11	32	282	269	+13	93
3	x – Anaheim Ducks	82	43	33	6	26	273	288	−15	92
4	x – Los Angeles Kings	82	35	27	20	22	225	247	−22	90
5	San Jose Sharks	82	39	35	8	27	251	292	−41	86
6	Seattle Kraken	82	34	37	11	26	226	263	−37	79
7	Calgary Flames	82	34	39	9	27	212	259	−47	77
8	Vancouver Canucks	82	25	49	8	15	216	316	−100	58

Source: National Hockey League
Rules for classification: 1) Fewer number of games played (GP, only during regular season); 2) Greater number of regulation wins (RW); 3) Greater number of wins in regulation and overtime, excluding shootout wins (ROW); 4) Greater number of total wins, including shootouts (W); 5) Greater number of points earned in head-to-head play; if teams played an uneven number of head-to-head games, the result of the first game on the home ice of the team with the extra home game is discarded; 6) Greater goal differential (GD); 7) Greater number of goals scored (GF)
x – Clinched playoff spot; y – Clinched division

=== Conference standings ===
Western Conference Wild Card
Pos	Div	Team	GP	W	L	OTL	RW	GF	GA	GD	Pts
1	CE	x – Utah Mammoth	82	43	33	6	33	268	240	+28	92
2	PA	x – Los Angeles Kings	82	35	27	20	22	225	247	−22	90
3	CE	St. Louis Blues	82	37	33	12	33	231	258	−27	86
4	CE	Nashville Predators	82	38	34	10	28	247	269	−22	86
5	PA	San Jose Sharks	82	39	35	8	27	251	292	−41	86
6	CE	Winnipeg Jets	82	35	35	12	28	231	260	−29	82
7	PA	Seattle Kraken	82	34	37	11	26	226	263	−37	79
8	PA	Calgary Flames	82	34	39	9	27	212	259	−47	77
9	CE	Chicago Blackhawks	82	29	39	14	22	213	275	−62	72
10	PA	Vancouver Canucks	82	25	49	8	15	216	316	−100	58

Source: National Hockey League
Rules for classification: 1) Fewer number of games played (GP, only during regular season); 2) Greater number of regulation wins (RW); 3) Greater number of wins in regulation and overtime, excluding shootout wins (ROW); 4) Greater number of total wins, including shootouts (W); 5) Greater number of points earned in head-to-head play; if teams played an uneven number of head-to-head games, the result of the first game on the home ice of the team with the extra home game is discarded; 6) Greater goal differential (GD); 7) Greater number of goals scored (GF)
x – Clinched playoff spot

== Schedule and results ==
=== Preseason ===
The preseason schedule was published on June 20, 2025.

2025 preseason game log: 5–2–0 (Home: 3–1–0; Road: 2–1–0)

#	Date	Visitor	Score	Home	OT	Decision	Location	Attendance	Record
1^{A}	September 21	Anaheim	3–1	Los Angeles		George (1–0–0)	Toyota Arena	9,533	1–0–0
2	September 23	Los Angeles	3–1	Vegas		Forsberg (1–0–0)	T-Mobile Arena	17,439	2–0–0
3	September 24	Los Angeles	3–0	Anaheim		Kuemper (1–0–0)	Honda Center	11,517	3–0–0
4^{B}	September 27	Anaheim	5–3	Los Angeles		Portillo (0–1–0)	Dignity Health Arena	—	3–1–0
5^{C}	September 30	Utah	2–3	Los Angeles		Copley (1–0–0)	Idaho Central Arena	—	4–1–0
6	October 2	Los Angeles	1–2	Utah		Forsberg (1–1–0)	Delta Center	12,478	4–2–0
7	October 4	Anaheim	4–5	Los Angeles	OT	Kuemper (2–0–0)	Crypto.com Arena	11,151	5–2–0

Legend: Win Loss Overtime/shootout loss ^{A} – Game played in Ontario, California ^{B} – Game played in Bakersfield, California ^{C} – Game played in Boise, Idaho

=== Regular season ===
The regular season schedule was released on July 16, 2025.

2025–26 game log: 35–27–20 (Home: 15–17–9; Road: 20–10–11)
October: 5–3–4 (Home: 0–2–2; Road: 5–1–2)

#	Date	Visitor	Score	Home	OT	Decision	Location	Attendance	Record	Points	Recap
1	October 7	Colorado	4–1	Los Angeles		Kuemper	Crypto.com Arena	18,145	0–1–0	0	
2	October 8	Los Angeles	6–5	Vegas	SO	Forsberg	T-Mobile Arena	18,393	1–1–0	2	
3	October 11	Los Angeles	2–3	Winnipeg		Kuemper	Canada Life Centre	14,204	1–2–0	2	
4	October 13	Los Angeles	3–4	Minnesota	SO	Kuemper	Grand Casino Arena	17,102	1–2–1	3	
5	October 16	Pittsburgh	4–2	Los Angeles		Forsberg	Crypto.com Arena	14,737	1–3–1	3	
6	October 18	Carolina	4–3	Los Angeles	OT	Forsberg	Crypto.com Arena	18,145	1–3–2	4	
7	October 21	Los Angeles	2–1	St. Louis	OT	Kuemper	Enterprise Center	16,710	2–3–2	6	
8	October 23	Los Angeles	3–2	Dallas	OT	Kuemper	American Airlines Center	18,532	3–3–2	8	
9	October 25	Los Angeles	4–5	Nashville	SO	Kuemper	Bridgestone Arena	17,159	3–3–3	9	
10	October 26	Los Angeles	3–1	Chicago		Forsberg	United Center	16,620	4–3–3	11	
11	October 28	Los Angeles	4–3	San Jose		Kuemper	SAP Center	12,804	5–3–3	13	
12	October 30	Detroit	4–3	Los Angeles	SO	Kuemper	Crypto.com Arena	16,013	5–3–4	14	

November: 7–3–3 (Home: 3–2–1; Road: 4–1–2)

#	Date	Visitor	Score	Home	OT	Decision	Location	Attendance	Record	Points	Recap
13	November 1	New Jersey	4–1	Los Angeles		Kuemper	Crypto.com Arena	16,110	5–4–4	14	
14	November 4	Winnipeg	0–3	Los Angeles		Kuemper	Crypto.com Arena	14,671	6–4–4	16	
15	November 6	Florida	5–2	Los Angeles		Forsberg	Crypto.com Arena	16,909	6–5–4	16	
16	November 9	Los Angeles	3–2	Pittsburgh		Kuemper	PPG Paints Arena	18,343	7–5–4	18	
17	November 11	Los Angeles	5–1	Montreal		Kuemper	Bell Centre	20,962	8–5–4	20	
18	November 13	Los Angeles	4–3	Toronto	OT	Kuemper	Scotiabank Arena	18,305	9–5–4	22	
19	November 15	Los Angeles	1–0	Ottawa		Forsberg	Canadian Tire Centre	17,772	10–5–4	24	
20	November 17	Los Angeles	1–2	Washington		Kuemper	Capital One Arena	17,649	10–6–4	24	
21	November 20	Los Angeles	3–4	San Jose	SO	Forsberg	SAP Center	16,387	10–6–5	25	
22	November 21	Boston	2–1	Los Angeles	OT	Kuemper	Crypto.com Arena	18,145	10–6–6	26	
23	November 24	Ottawa	1–2	Los Angeles		Kuemper	Crypto.com Arena	17,421	11–6–6	28	
24	November 28	Los Angeles	4–5	Anaheim	SO	Kuemper	Honda Center	17,174	11–6–7	29	
25	November 29	Vancouver	1–2	Los Angeles	OT	Forsberg	Crypto.com Arena	18,145	12–6–7	31	

December: 4–7–2 (Home: 2–4–1; Road: 2–3–1)

#	Date	Visitor	Score	Home	OT	Decision	Location	Attendance	Record	Points	Recap
26	December 2	Washington	3–1	Los Angeles		Kuemper	Crypto.com Arena	16,509	12–7–7	31	
27	December 4	Chicago	2–1	Los Angeles		Kuemper	Crypto.com Arena	16,225	12–8–7	31	
28	December 6	Chicago	0–6	Los Angeles		Kuemper	Crypto.com Arena	18,145	13–8–7	33	
29	December 8	Los Angeles	4–2	Utah		Kuemper	Delta Center	12,478	14–8–7	35	
30	December 10	Los Angeles	2–3	Seattle	OT	Forsberg	Climate Pledge Arena	17,151	14–8–8	36	
31	December 13	Calgary	2–1	Los Angeles	OT	Kuemper	Crypto.com Arena	18,145	14–8–9	37	
32	December 15	Los Angeles	1–4	Dallas		Forsberg	American Airlines Center	18,532	14–9–9	37	
33	December 17	Los Angeles	2–3	Florida		Forsberg	Amerant Bank Arena	19,612	14–10–9	37	
34	December 18	Los Angeles	2–1	Tampa Bay		Forsberg	Benchmark International Arena	19,092	15–10–9	39	
35	December 22	Columbus	3–1	Los Angeles		Forsberg	Crypto.com Arena	18,145	15–11–9	39	
36	December 23	Seattle	3–2	Los Angeles		Copley	Crypto.com Arena	18,143	15–12–9	39	
37	December 27	Anaheim	1–6	Los Angeles		Forsberg	Crypto.com Arena	18,145	16–12–9	41	
38	December 29	Los Angeles	2–5	Colorado		Forsberg	Ball Arena	18,143	16–13–9	41	

January: 6–4–4 (Home: 3–2–3; Road: 3–2–1)

#	Date	Visitor	Score	Home	OT	Decision	Location	Attendance	Record	Points	Recap
39	January 1	Tampa Bay	5–3	Los Angeles		Kuemper	Crypto.com Arena	18,001	16–14–9	41	
40	January 3	Minnesota	4–5	Los Angeles	SO	Kuemper	Crypto.com Arena	18,145	17–14–9	43	
41	January 5	Minnesota	2–4	Los Angeles		Kuemper	Crypto.com Arena	16,874	18–14–9	45	
42	January 7	San Jose	4–3	Los Angeles	OT	Kuemper	Crypto.com Arena	17,473	18–14–10	46	
43	January 9	Los Angeles	1–5	Winnipeg		Kuemper	Canada Life Centre	14,412	18–15–10	46	
44	January 10	Los Angeles	4–3	Edmonton	SO	Forsberg	Rogers Place	18,347	19–15–10	48	
45	January 12	Dallas	3–1	Los Angeles		Kuemper	Crypto.com Arena	17,088	19–16–10	48	
46	January 14	Vegas	3–2	Los Angeles	OT	Kuemper	Crypto.com Arena	18,145	19–16–11	49	
47	January 16	Anaheim	3–2	Los Angeles	SO	Kuemper	Crypto.com Arena	18,145	19–16–12	50	
48	January 17	Los Angeles	1–2	Anaheim	OT	Forsberg	Honda Center	16,214	19–16–13	51	
49	January 20	NY Rangers	3–4	Los Angeles		Forsberg	Crypto.com Arena	18,145	20–16–13	53	
50	January 24	Los Angeles	5–4	St. Louis	SO	Kuemper	Enterprise Center	17,214	21–16–13	55	
—	January 26	Los Angeles		Columbus	Game postponed due to severe weather. Makeup date: March 9						
51	January 27	Los Angeles	3–1	Detroit		Forsberg	Little Caesars Arena	19,515	22–16–13	57	
52	January 29	Los Angeles	1–4	Buffalo		Kuemper	KeyBank Center	19,070	22–17–13	57	
53	January 31	Los Angeles	3–2	Philadelphia	OT	Kuemper	Xfinity Mobile Arena	19,771	23–17–13	59	

February: 1–4–1 (Home: 1–3–0; Road: 0–1–1)

#	Date	Visitor	Score	Home	OT	Decision	Location	Attendance	Record	Points	Recap
54	February 1	Los Angeles	2–3	Carolina	OT	Forsberg	Lenovo Center	18,299	23–17–14	60	
55	February 4	Seattle	4–2	Los Angeles		Kuemper	Crypto.com Arena	18,145	23–18–14	60	
56	February 5	Los Angeles	1–4	Vegas		Forsberg	T-Mobile Arena	18,020	23–19–14	60	
57	February 25	Vegas	6–4	Los Angeles		Forsberg	Crypto.com Arena	18,145	23–20–14	60	
58	February 26	Edmonton	8–1	Los Angeles		Kuemper	Crypto.com Arena	17,037	23–21–14	60	
59	February 28	Calgary	0–2	Los Angeles		Forsberg	Crypto.com Arena	18,145	24–21–14	62	

March: 5–5–4 (Home: 1–4–1; Road: 4–1–3)

#	Date	Visitor	Score	Home	OT	Decision	Location	Attendance	Record	Points	Recap
60	March 2	Colorado	4–2	Los Angeles		Forsberg	Crypto.com Arena	15,492	24–22–14	62	
61	March 5	NY Islanders	3–5	Los Angeles		Kuemper	Crypto.com Arena	17,078	25–22–14	64	
62	March 7	Montreal	4–3	Los Angeles		Kuemper	Crypto.com Arena	18,145	25–23–14	64	
63	March 9	Los Angeles	5–4	Columbus	OT	Forsberg	Nationwide Arena	14,838	26–23–14	66	
64	March 10	Los Angeles	1–2	Boston	OT	Kuemper	TD Garden	17,850	26–23–15	67	
65	March 13	Los Angeles	3–2	NY Islanders		Kuemper	UBS Arena	17,255	27–23–15	69	
66	March 14	Los Angeles	4–6	New Jersey		Forsberg	Prudential Center	16,072	27–24–15	69	
67	March 16	Los Angeles	4–1	NY Rangers		Kuemper	Madison Square Garden	17,752	28–24–15	71	
68	March 19	Philadelphia	4–3	Los Angeles	SO	Kuemper	Crypto.com Arena	18,145	28–24–16	72	
69	March 21	Buffalo	4–1	Los Angeles		Forsberg	Crypto.com Arena	18,145	28–25–16	72	
70	March 22	Los Angeles	3–4	Utah	OT	Kuemper	Delta Center	12,478	28–25–17	73	
71	March 24	Los Angeles	2–3	Calgary	SO	Kuemper	Scotiabank Saddledome	16,665	28–25–18	74	
72	March 26	Los Angeles	4–0	Vancouver		Kuemper	Rogers Arena	18,611	29–25–18	76	
73	March 28	Utah	6–2	Los Angeles		Kuemper	Crypto.com Arena	18,145	29–26–18	76	

April: 6–1–2 (Home: 5–0–1; Road: 1–1–1)

#	Date	Visitor	Score	Home	OT	Decision	Location	Attendance	Record	Points	Recap
74	April 1	St. Louis	1–2	Los Angeles	OT	Forsberg	Crypto.com Arena	14,188	30–26–18	78	
75	April 2	Nashville	5–4	Los Angeles	SO	Kuemper	Crypto.com Arena	18,145	30–26–19	79	
76	April 4	Toronto	6–7	Los Angeles	OT	Kuemper	Crypto.com Arena	18,145	31–26–19	81	
77	April 6	Nashville	2–3	Los Angeles	SO	Forsberg	Crypto.com Arena	17,540	32–26–19	83	
78	April 9	Vancouver	1–4	Los Angeles		Forsberg	Crypto.com Arena	18,145	33–26–19	85	
79	April 11	Edmonton	0–1	Los Angeles		Forsberg	Crypto.com Arena	18,145	34–26–19	87	
80	April 13	Los Angeles	5–3	Seattle		Forsberg	Climate Pledge Arena	17,151	35–26–19	89	
81	April 14	Los Angeles	3–4	Vancouver	OT	Kuemper	Rogers Arena	18,969	35–26–20	90	
82	April 16	Los Angeles	1–3	Calgary		Forsberg	Scotiabank Saddledome	18,711	35–27–20	90	

Legend: Win Loss Overtime/shootout loss

=== Playoffs ===
2026 Stanley Cup playoffs
Western Conference first round vs. (C1) Colorado Avalanche: Colorado won 4–0

#	Date	Visitor	Score	Home	OT	Decision	Attendance	Series	Recap
1	April 19	Los Angeles	1–2	Colorado		Forsberg	18,101	0–1	
2	April 21	Los Angeles	1–2	Colorado	OT	Forsberg	18,142	0–2	
3	April 23	Colorado	4–2	Los Angeles		Forsberg	18,145	0–3	
4	April 26	Colorado	5–1	Los Angeles		Forsberg	18,145	0–4	

Legend: Win Loss

== Player statistics ==
As of the end of the season

=== Skaters ===
Regular season
Player	GP	G	A	Pts	+/−	PIM
Adrian Kempe	81	36	37	73	+14	58
Quinton Byfield	79	24	25	49	−2	46
Alex Laferriere	82	21	23	44	+3	18
Kevin Fiala	56	18	22	40	−11	34
Brandt Clarke	82	8	32	40	+11	63
Anze Kopitar	67	12	26	38	+19	10
Trevor Moore	69	13	19	32	0	8
Corey Perry^{‡}	50	11	17	28	−1	59
Artemi Panarin^{†}	26	9	18	27	+9	6
Joel Armia	67	13	12	25	+1	30
Andrei Kuzmenko	52	13	12	25	−4	16
Drew Doughty	72	5	18	23	+4	40
Joel Edmundson	82	2	21	23	+14	25
Mikey Anderson	80	4	16	20	+8	22
Brian Dumoulin	82	2	15	17	−1	22
Alex Turcotte	62	3	11	14	−8	21
Warren Foegele^{‡}	47	7	2	9	−6	14
Samuel Helenius	53	5	4	9	−6	50
Jeff Malott	58	3	6	9	−9	55
Cody Ceci	82	1	8	9	−10	16
Scott Laughton^{†}	21	5	3	8	−2	14
Taylor Ward	36	3	4	7	0	7
Phillip Danault^{‡}	30	0	5	5	+3	6
Jared Wright	23	0	4	4	0	4
Andre Lee	7	1	1	2	−2	0
Angus Booth	1	1	0	1	+1	0
Mathieu Joseph^{†}	12	0	0	0	−2	5
Jacob Moverare	15	0	0	0	−4	0
Kenny Connors	2	0	0	0	−1	0

Playoffs
Player	GP	G	A	Pts	+/−	PIM
Alex Laferriere	4	0	4	4	−4	0
Artemi Panarin	4	2	1	3	−4	0
Adrian Kempe	4	1	1	2	−5	4
Trevor Moore	4	1	1	2	−1	0
Quinton Byfield	4	0	2	2	−4	6
Joel Edmundson	4	1	0	1	−3	0
Brandt Clarke	4	0	1	1	−5	0
Anze Kopitar	4	0	0	0	−5	0
Drew Doughty	4	0	0	0	−3	0
Brian Dumoulin	4	0	0	0	−1	2
Joel Armia	3	0	0	0	−1	6
Scott Laughton	4	0	0	0	−2	0
Cody Ceci	4	0	0	0	−2	0
Mathieu Joseph	2	0	0	0	−2	2
Mikey Anderson	4	0	0	0	−3	2
Alex Turcotte	1	0	0	0	0	0
Jeff Malott	4	0	0	0	−3	14
Samuel Helenius	4	0	0	0	−2	14
Taylor Ward	1	0	0	0	−1	0
Jared Wright	4	0	0	0	−1	0
Andrei Kuzmenko	1	0	0	0	0	0

=== Goaltenders ===
Regular season
Player	GP	GS	TOI	W	L	OT	GA	GAA	SA	SV%	SO	G	A	PIM
Darcy Kuemper	50	50	2887:54	19	14	15	134	2.78	1234	.891	3	0	1	6
Anton Forsberg	36	31	2032:06	16	12	5	87	2.57	952	.910	3	0	0	4
Pheonix Copley	1	1	58:34	0	1	0	3	3.07	28	.893	0	0	0	0

Playoffs
Player	GP	GS	TOI	W	L	GA	GAA	SA	SV%	SO	G	A	PIM
Anton Forsberg	4	4	244:12	0	4	11	2.70	121	.909	0	0	0	0

^{†}Denotes player spent time with another team before joining the Kings.
^{‡}Denotes player was traded mid-season. Stats reflect time with the Kings only.
Bold/italics denotes franchise record.

== Awards and honours ==
=== Milestones ===
- On March 5, 2026, Los Angeles Kings forward Anze Kopitar played his 1,500th NHL game, becoming the 25th player to reach the mark.

== Transactions ==
The Kings have been involved in the following transactions during the 2025–26 season.

Key:

† Contract is entry-level.
‡ Contract initially takes effect in the 2026–27 season.

=== Trades ===
Date	Details		Ref
June 27, 2025	To Los Angeles Kings EDM 1st-round pick in 2025; WSH 2nd-round pick in 2025	To Pittsburgh Penguins 1st-round pick in 2025	
June 28, 2025	To Los Angeles Kings NSH 3rd-round pick in 2025 (67th overall); COL 6th-round pick in 2026	To Ottawa Senators Jordan Spence	
June 28, 2025	To Los Angeles Kings 4th-round pick in 2025; DAL 3rd-round pick in 2026	To Carolina Hurricanes NSH 3rd-round pick in 2025	
October 15, 2025	To Los Angeles Kings Pheonix Copley	To Tampa Bay Lightning future considerations	
December 2, 2025	To Los Angeles Kings Nikita Alexandrov	To St. Louis Blues Akil Thomas	
December 19, 2025	To Los Angeles Kings CBJ 2nd-round pick in 2026	To Montreal Canadiens Phillip Danault	
February 4, 2026	To Los Angeles Kings Artemi Panarin*	To New York Rangers Liam Greentree conditional CBJ 2nd-round pick in 2026 or LAK 2nd-round pick in 2026 or DAL 3rd-round pick in 2026 or LAK 3rd-round pick in 2026 conditional DAL 4th-round pick in 2028	
March 5, 2026	To Los Angeles Kings BUF 2nd-round pick in 2026 conditional (Note: Los Angeles will receive the higher-placed of Ottawa's or Washington's third-round picks in 2026 if one or both of the teams qualify for the 2026 Playoffs; otherwise Los Angeles will received the worse of Ottawa’s or Washington's third-round picks in 2026.) OTT 3rd-round pick in 2026 or WSH 3rd-round pick in 2026	To Ottawa Senators Warren Foegele conditional (Note: Ottawa will receive the lower-placed of Los Angeles' or Dallas' third-round picks in 2026.) DAL 3rd-round pick in 2026 or LAK 3rd-round pick in 2026	
March 6, 2026	To Los Angeles Kings 2nd-round pick in 2028	To Tampa Bay Lightning Corey Perry* (Note: Los Angeles retained 50% of Perry's contract.)	
March 6, 2026	To Los Angeles Kings Scott Laughton	To Toronto Maple Leafs conditional (Note: Toronto will receive a second-round pick in 2026 if Los Angeles qualifies for the 2026 playoffs. Toronto will receive the better of Ottawa's or Washington's third-round picks in 2026 if Los Angeles fails to qualify for the 2026 playoffs, but at least one of Ottawa or Washington do; otherwise, Toronto will receive the worse of Ottawa's or Washington's third-round picks in 2026.) 2nd-round pick in 2026 or OTT 3rd-round pick in 2026 or WSH 3rd-round pick in 2026	
March 12, 2026	To Los Angeles Kings Jan Jenik	To Ottawa Senators Samuel Bolduc	

=== Players acquired ===
Date	Player	Former team	Term	Via	Ref
July 1, 2025	Joel Armia	Montreal Canadiens	2-year	Free agency	
July 1, 2025	Cody Ceci	Dallas Stars	4-year	Free agency	
July 1, 2025	Brian Dumoulin	New Jersey Devils	3-year	Free agency	
July 1, 2025	Anton Forsberg	Ottawa Senators	2-year	Free agency	
July 1, 2025	Corey Perry	Edmonton Oilers	1-year	Free agency	
July 2, 2025	Samuel Bolduc	New York Islanders	1-year	Free agency	
July 2, 2025	Logan Brown	Tampa Bay Lightning	1-year	Free agency	
July 2, 2025	Cole Guttman	Chicago Blackhawks	2-year	Free agency	

=== Players lost ===
Date	Player	New team	Term	Via	Ref
July 1, 2025	Vladislav Gavrikov	New York Rangers	7-year	Free agency	
July 1, 2025	Tanner Jeannot	Boston Bruins	5-year	Free agency	
July 1, 2025	Caleb Jones	Pittsburgh Penguins	2-year	Free agency	
July 1, 2025	David Rittich	New York Islanders	1-year	Free agency	
July 2, 2025	Samuel Fagemo	Winnipeg Jets	1-year	Free agency	
July 2, 2025	Jack Studnicka	Florida Panthers	1-year	Free agency	
July 23, 2025	Joseph Cecconi	Avangard Omsk (KHL)	1-year	Free agency	

=== Signings ===
Date	Player	Term	Ref
June 30, 2025	Andrei Kuzmenko	1–year	
July 2, 2025	Taylor Ward	1–year	
August 2, 2025	Alex Laferriere	3–year	
November 17, 2025	Adrian Kempe	8–year‡	
December 2, 2025	Samuel Helenius	2–year‡	
December 10, 2025	Vojtěch Čihař	3–year†	
January 29, 2026	Taylor Ward	2–year‡	
February 4, 2026	Artemi Panarin	2–year‡	
March 6, 2026	Mathieu Joseph	1–year	
April 4, 2026	Henry Brzustewicz	3–year†‡	

== Draft picks ==
Below are the Kings selections at the 2025 NHL entry draft, which was held on June 27 and 28, 2025, at the Peacock Theater in Los Angeles, California.

Round	#	Player	Pos	Nationality	College/Junior/Club team	League
1	31 (Note: The Edmonton Oilers' first-round pick went to the Los Angeles Kings as the result of a trade on June 27, 2025, that sent a first-round pick in 2025 (24th overall) to Pittsburgh in exchange for Washington's second-round pick in 2025 (59th overall) and this pick.)	Henry Brzustewicz	D	United States	London Knights	OHL
2	59 (Note: The Washington Capitals' second-round pick went to the Kings as the result of a trade on June 27, 2025, that sent a first-round pick in 2025 (24th overall) to Pittsburgh in exchange for a first-round pick in 2025 (24th overall) and this pick.)	Vojtěch Čihař	LW	Czech Republic	HC Energie Karlovy Vary	Czech Extraliga
3	88	Kristian Epperson	LW	United States	Saginaw Spirit	OHL
4	120	Caeden Herrington	D	United States	Lincoln Stars	USHL
4	125 (Note: The Carolina Hurricanes' fourth-round pick went to the Kings as the result of a trade on June 28, 2025, that sent Nashville's third-round pick in 2025 (67th overall) to Carolina in exchange for Dallas' third-round pick in 2026 and this pick.)	Jimmy Lombardi	C	Canada	Flint Firebirds	OHL
5	152	Petteri Rimpinen	G	Finland	Kiekko-Espoo	Liiga
6	184	Jan Chovan	C	Slovakia	Tappara U20	U20 SM-sarja
7	196	Brendan McMorrow	C	United States	Waterloo Black Hawks	USHL
7	216	Will Sharpe	D	Canada	Kelowna Rockets	WHL
