= 2025–26 Montreal Canadiens season =

Season of play of professional ice hockey team

2025–26 Montreal Canadiens
- Division: 3rd Atlantic
- Conference: 4th Eastern
- 2025–26 record: 48–24–10
- Home record: 24–15–2
- Road record: 24–9–8
- Goals for: 283
- Goals against: 256

Team information
- General manager: Kent Hughes
- Coach: Martin St. Louis
- Captain: Nick Suzuki
- Alternate captains: Brendan Gallagher; Mike Matheson
- Arena: Bell Centre
- Minor league affiliates: Laval Rocket (AHL); Trois-Rivières Lions (ECHL)

Team leaders
- Goals: Cole Caufield (51)
- Assists: Nick Suzuki (72)
- Points: Nick Suzuki (101)
- Penalty minutes: Arber Xhekaj (116)
- Plus/minus: Nick Suzuki (+37)
- Wins: Jakub Dobeš (29)
- Goals against average: Jacob Fowler (2.43)

The 2025–26 Montreal Canadiens season was the 117th for the club that was established on December 4, 1909, and their 109th season as a franchise in the National Hockey League (NHL).

Improving on their success of the season prior, the Canadiens finished the regular season with the sixth-best record across the NHL, and third-best in the Atlantic Division. Qualifying for the postseason for a second consecutive year, the team faced the Tampa Bay Lightning in the first round of the 2026 Stanley Cup playoffs, ultimately prevailing in a seven-game series to earn their first postseason series victory in five years. They went on to defeat the Buffalo Sabres in the second round, again in seven games, before eventually losing to the Carolina Hurricanes in five games of the Eastern Conference final.

The regular season saw key members of the Canadiens' roster reach a number of offensive milestones, including winger Cole Caufield scoring 51 goals, becoming the first franchise player to reach the 50-goal plateau since Stephane Richer in 1989–90, and captain Nick Suzuki finishing with 101 points, marking the first individual 100-point campaign for the team since Mats Naslund in 1985–86. For their efforts, Caufield received the Lady Byng Memorial Trophy as the league's most gentlemanly player, while Suzuki was named winner of the Frank J. Selke Trophy as the best defensive forward in the NHL.

== Standings ==
=== Divisional standings ===
Atlantic Division
Pos	Team	GP	W	L	OTL	RW	GF	GA	GD	Pts
1	y – Buffalo Sabres	82	50	23	9	42	288	241	+47	109
2	x – Tampa Bay Lightning	82	50	26	6	40	290	231	+59	106
3	x – Montreal Canadiens	82	48	24	10	34	283	256	+27	106
4	x – Boston Bruins	82	45	27	10	33	272	250	+22	100
5	x – Ottawa Senators	82	44	27	11	38	278	246	+32	99
6	Detroit Red Wings	82	41	31	10	30	241	258	−17	92
7	Florida Panthers	82	40	38	4	32	251	276	−25	84
8	Toronto Maple Leafs	82	32	36	14	23	253	299	−46	78

Source: National Hockey League
Rules for classification: 1) Fewer number of games played (GP, only during regular season); 2) Greater number of regulation wins (RW); 3) Greater number of wins in regulation and overtime, excluding shootout wins (ROW); 4) Greater number of total wins, including shootouts (W); 5) Greater number of points earned in head-to-head play; if teams played an uneven number of head-to-head games, the result of the first game on the home ice of the team with the extra home game is discarded; 6) Greater goal differential (GD); 7) Greater number of goals scored (GF)
x – Clinched playoff spot; y – Clinched division

=== Conference standings ===
Eastern Conference Wild Card
Pos	Div	Team	GP	W	L	OTL	RW	GF	GA	GD	Pts
1	AT	x – Boston Bruins	82	45	27	10	33	272	250	+22	100
2	AT	x – Ottawa Senators	82	44	27	11	38	278	246	+32	99
3	ME	Washington Capitals	82	43	30	9	37	263	244	+19	95
4	AT	Detroit Red Wings	82	41	31	10	30	241	258	−17	92
5	ME	Columbus Blue Jackets	82	40	30	12	28	253	253	0	92
6	ME	New York Islanders	82	43	34	5	29	233	241	−8	91
7	ME	New Jersey Devils	82	42	37	3	29	230	254	−24	87
8	AT	Florida Panthers	82	40	38	4	32	251	276	−25	84
9	AT	Toronto Maple Leafs	82	32	36	14	23	253	299	−46	78
10	ME	New York Rangers	82	34	39	9	25	238	250	−12	77

Source: National Hockey League
Rules for classification: 1) Fewer number of games played (GP, only during regular season); 2) Greater number of regulation wins (RW); 3) Greater number of wins in regulation and overtime, excluding shootout wins (ROW); 4) Greater number of total wins, including shootouts (W); 5) Greater number of points earned in head-to-head play; if teams played an uneven number of head-to-head games, the result of the first game on the home ice of the team with the extra home game is discarded; 6) Greater goal differential (GD); 7) Greater number of goals scored (GF)
x – Clinched playoff spot

== Schedule and results ==
=== Preseason ===
The preseason schedule was published on June 25, 2025.

2025 preseason game log: 4–2–0 (Home: 2–2–0; Road: 2–0–0)
#	Date	Visitor	Score	Home	OT	Decision	Attendance	Record	Recap
1	September 22	Pittsburgh	1–2	Montreal	SO	Fowler	20,595	1–0–0
2	September 23	Philadelphia	2–4	Montreal		Kähkönen	20,429	2–0–0
3	September 25	Toronto	7–2	Montreal		Montembeault	20,962	2–1–0
4	September 27	Montreal	4–2	Toronto		Kähkönen	18,216	3–1–0
5	September 30^{A}	Montreal	5–0	Ottawa		Dobeš	18,259	4–1–0
6	October 4	Ottawa	3–1	Montreal		Montembeault	20,962	4–2–0
Notes:^{A} Game played at the Videotron Centre in Quebec City, Quebec.

=== Regular season ===
The regular season schedule was released on July 16, 2025.

2025–26 game log

October: 8–3–0 (home: 3–1–0; road: 5–2–0)
#	Date	Visitor	Score	Home	OT	Decision	Attendance	Record	Pts	Recap
1	October 8	Montreal	2–5	Toronto		Montembeault	19,037	0–1–0	0
2	October 9	Montreal	5–1	Detroit		Dobeš	19,515	1–1–0	2
3	October 11	Montreal	3–2	Chicago		Montembeault	19,344	2–1–0	4
4	October 14	Seattle	4–5	Montreal	OT	Montembeault	20,962	3–1–0	6
5	October 16	Nashville	2–3	Montreal	OT	Dobeš	20,962	4–1–0	8
6	October 18	NY Rangers	4–3	Montreal		Montembeault	20,962	4–2–0	8
7	October 20	Buffalo	2–4	Montreal		Dobeš	20,962	5–2–0	10
8	October 22	Montreal	2–1	Calgary	OT	Dobeš	17,826	6–2–0	12
9	October 23	Montreal	5–6	Edmonton		Montembeault	18,347	6–3–0	12
10	October 25	Montreal	4–3	Vancouver		Dobeš	18,846	7–3–0	14
11	October 28	Montreal	4–3	Seattle	OT	Dobeš	17,151	8–3–0	16

November: 5–5–3 (home: 3–4–1; road: 2–1–2)
#	Date	Visitor	Score	Home	OT	Decision	Attendance	Record	Pts	Recap
12	November 1	Ottawa	3–4	Montreal	OT	Montembeault	20,962	9–3–0	18
13	November 4	Philadelphia	5–4	Montreal	SO	Montembeault	20,962	9–3–1	19
14	November 6	Montreal	3–4	New Jersey	OT	Dobeš	16,514	9–3–2	20
15	November 8	Utah	2–6	Montreal		Montembeault	20,962	10–3–2	22
16	November 11	Los Angeles	5–1	Montreal		Montembeault	20,962	10–4–2	22
17	November 13	Dallas	7–0	Montreal		Dobeš	20,962	10–5–2	22
18	November 15	Boston	3–2	Montreal		Montembeault	20,962	10–6–2	22
19	November 17	Montreal	3–4	Columbus	SO	Dobeš	14,811	10–6–3	23
20	November 20	Washington	8–4	Montreal		Dobeš	20,962	10–7–3	23
21	November 22	Toronto	2–5	Montreal		Dobeš	20,962	11–7–3	25
22	November 26	Montreal	4–3	Utah		Dobeš	12,478	12–7–3	27
23	November 28	Montreal	4–1	Vegas		Montembeault	17,739	13–7–3	29
24	November 29	Montreal	2–7	Colorado		Dobeš	18,112	13–8–3	29

December: 8–4–3 (home: 4–4–0; road: 4–0–3)
#	Date	Visitor	Score	Home	OT	Decision	Attendance	Record	Pts	Recap
25	December 2	Ottawa	5–2	Montreal		Montembeault	20,962	13–9–3	29
26	December 3	Winnipeg	2–3	Montreal	SO	Dobeš	20,962	14–9–3	31
27	December 6	Montreal	2–1	Toronto	SO	Dobeš	19,081	15–10–3	33
28	December 7	St. Louis	4–3	Montreal		Dobeš	20,962	15–10–3	33
29	December 9	Tampa Bay	6–1	Montreal		Montembeault	20,962	15–11–3	33
30	December 11	Montreal	4–2	Pittsburgh		Fowler	14,845	16–11–3	35
31	December 13	Montreal	4–5	NY Rangers	OT	Fowler	18,006	16–11–4	36
32	December 14	Edmonton	1–4	Montreal		Dobeš	20,962	17–11–4	38
33	December 16	Philadelphia	4–1	Montreal		Fowler	20,962	17–12–4	38
34	December 18	Chicago	1–4	Montreal		Dobeš	20,962	18–12–4	40
35	December 20	Pittsburgh	0–4	Montreal		Fowler	20,962	19–12–4	42
36	December 21	Montreal	3–4	Pittsburgh	SO	Dobeš	17,695	19–12–5	43
37	December 23	Montreal	6–2	Boston		Fowler	17,850	20–12–5	45
38	December 28	Montreal	4–5	Tampa Bay	SO	Fowler	19,092	20–12–6	46
39	December 30	Montreal	3–2	Florida	OT	Montembeault	19,646	21–12–6	48

January: 10–5–1 (home: 6–2–0; road: 4–3–1)
#	Date	Visitor	Score	Home	OT	Decision	Attendance	Record	Pts	Recap
40	January 1	Montreal	7–5	Carolina		Dobeš	18,299	22–12–6	50
41	January 3	Montreal	0–2	St. Louis		Fowler	18,096	22–13–6	50
42	January 4	Montreal	4–3	Dallas	OT	Montembeault	18,532	23–13–6	52
43	January 7	Calgary	1–4	Montreal		Fowler	20,962	24–13–6	54
44	January 8	Florida	2–6	Montreal		Montembeault	20,962	25–13–6	56
45	January 10	Detroit	4–0	Montreal		Fowler	20,962	25–14–6	56
46	January 12	Vancouver	3–6	Montreal		Dobeš	20,962	26–14–6	58
47	January 13	Montreal	2–3	Washington	OT	Montembeault	18,347	26–14–7	59
48	January 15	Montreal	3–5	Buffalo		Fowler	19,070	26–15–7	59
49	January 17	Montreal	6–5	Ottawa	OT	Montembeault	18,020	27–15–7	61
50	January 20	Minnesota	3–4	Montreal		Dobeš	20,962	28–15–7	63
51	January 22	Buffalo	4–2	Montreal		Montembeault	20,962	28–16–7	63
52	January 24	Montreal	3–4	Boston		Montembeault	17,850	28–17–7	63
53	January 27	Vegas	2–3	Montreal	OT	Dobeš	20,962	29–17–7	65
54	January 29	Colorado	3–7	Montreal		Dobeš	20,962	30–17–7	67
55	January 31	Montreal	4–2	Buffalo		Dobeš	19,070	31–17–7	69

February: 2–0–2 (home: 1–0–1; road: 1–0–1)
#	Date	Visitor	Score	Home	OT	Decision	Attendance	Record	Pts	Recap
56	February 2	Montreal	3–4	Minnesota	OT	Dobeš	18,228	31–17–8	70
57	February 4	Montreal	5–1	Winnipeg		Montembeault	15,225	32–17–8	72
58	February 26	NY Islanders	4–3	Montreal	OT	Montembeault	20,962	32–17–9	73
59	February 28	Washington	2–6	Montreal		Dobeš	20,962	33–17–9	75

March: 10–4–1 (home: 5–2–0; road: 5–2–1)
#	Date	Visitor	Score	Home	OT	Decision	Attendance	Record	Pts	Recap
60	March 3	Montreal	5–7	San Jose		Dobeš	17,435	33–18–9	75
61	March 6	Montreal	5–6	Anaheim	SO	Montembeault	14,470	33–18–10	76
62	March 7	Montreal	4–3	Los Angeles		Dobeš	18,145	34–18–10	78
63	March 10	Toronto	1–3	Montreal		Dobeš	20,962	35–18–10	80
64	March 11	Montreal	3–2	Ottawa		Fowler	17,229	36–18–10	82
65	March 14	San Jose	4–2	Montreal		Dobeš	20,962	36–19–10	82
66	March 15	Anaheim	4–3	Montreal		Fowler	20,962	36–20–10	82
67	March 17	Boston	2–3	Montreal	OT	Dobeš	20,962	37–20–10	84
68	March 19	Montreal	1–3	Detroit		Dobeš	19,515	37–21–10	84
69	March 21	NY Islanders	3–7	Montreal		Fowler	20,962	38–21–10	86
70	March 24	Carolina	2–5	Montreal		Dobeš	20,962	39–21–10	88
71	March 26	Columbus	1–2	Montreal		Dobeš	20,962	40–21–10	90
72	March 28	Montreal	4–1	Nashville		Fowler	17,720	41–21–10	92
73	March 29	Montreal	3–1	Carolina		Dobeš	18,551	42–21–10	94
74	March 31	Montreal	4–1	Tampa Bay		Dobeš	19,092	43–21–10	96

April: 5–3–0 (home: 2–2–0; road: 3–1–0)
#	Date	Visitor	Score	Home	OT	Decision	Attendance	Record	Pts	Recap
75	April 2	Montreal	3–2	NY Rangers		Fowler	17,424	44–21–10	98
76	April 4	Montreal	4–3	New Jersey	SO	Dobeš	16,514	45–21–10	100
77	April 5	New Jersey	3–0	Montreal		Fowler	20,962	45–22–10	100
78	April 7	Florida	3–4	Montreal	SO	Dobeš	20,962	46–22–10	102
79	April 9	Tampa Bay	1–2	Montreal		Dobeš	20,962	47–22–10	104
80	April 11	Columbus	5–2	Montreal		Dobeš	20,962	47–23–10	104
81	April 12	Montreal	4–1	NY Islanders		Fowler	16,918	48–23–10	106
82	April 14	Montreal	2–4	Philadelphia		Dobeš	20,041	48–24–10	106

Legend: Win (2 points) Loss (0 points) Overtime/shootout loss (1 point)

=== Playoffs ===
2026 Stanley Cup playoffs

Eastern Conference first round vs. (A2) Tampa Bay Lightning: Montreal won 4–3
#	Date	Visitor	Score	Home	OT	Decision	Attendance	Series	Recap
1	April 19	Montreal	4–3	Tampa Bay	OT	Dobeš	19,092	1–0
2	April 21	Montreal	2–3	Tampa Bay	OT	Dobes	19,092	1–1
3	April 24	Tampa Bay	2–3	Montreal	OT	Dobeš	20,962	2–1
4	April 26	Tampa Bay	3–2	Montreal		Dobeš	20,962	2–2
5	April 29	Montreal	3–2	Tampa Bay		Dobeš	19,092	3–2
6	May 1	Tampa Bay	1–0	Montreal	OT	Dobeš	20,962	3–3
7	May 3	Montreal	2–1	Tampa Bay		Dobeš	19,092	4–3

Eastern Conference second round vs. (A1) Buffalo Sabres: Montreal won 4–3
#	Date	Visitor	Score	Home	OT	Decision	Attendance	Series	Recap
1	May 6	Montreal	2–4	Buffalo		Dobeš	19,070	0–1
2	May 8	Montreal	5–1	Buffalo		Dobeš	19,070	1–1
3	May 10	Buffalo	2–6	Montreal		Dobeš	20,962	2–1
4	May 12	Buffalo	3–2	Montreal		Dobeš	20,962	2–2
5	May 14	Montreal	6–3	Buffalo		Dobeš	19,070	3–2
6	May 16	Buffalo	8–3	Montreal		Dobeš	20,962	3–3
7	May 18	Montreal	3–2	Buffalo	OT	Dobeš	19,070	4–3

Eastern Conference final vs. (M1) Carolina Hurricanes: Carolina won 4–1
#	Date	Visitor	Score	Home	OT	Decision	Attendance	Series	Recap
1	May 21	Montreal	6–2	Carolina		Dobeš	18,723	1–0
2	May 23	Montreal	2–3	Carolina	OT	Dobeš	18,819	1–1
3	May 25	Carolina	3–2	Montreal	OT	Dobeš	20,962	1–2
4	May 27	Carolina	4–0	Montreal		Dobeš	20,962	1–3
5	May 29	Montreal	1–6	Carolina		Dobeš	18,931	1–4

Legend: Win Loss

== Player statistics ==
Final stats

=== Skaters ===
Regular season
Player	GP	G	A	Pts	+/−	PIM
Nick Suzuki	82	29	72	101	+37	28
Cole Caufield	81	51	37	88	+29	14
Lane Hutson	82	12	66	78	+36	34
Juraj Slafkovský	82	30	43	73	+9	52
Ivan Demidov	82	19	43	62	+3	34
Noah Dobson	80	12	35	47	+5	34
Oliver Kapanen	82	22	15	37	+4	22
Mike Matheson	78	7	30	37	+9	34
Zachary Bolduc	78	12	18	30	−6	28
Alex Newhook	42	13	12	25	+9	10
Jake Evans	68	12	12	24	−8	28
Josh Anderson	72	14	9	23	−4	90
Brendan Gallagher	77	7	16	23	0	39
Alexandre Carrier	73	7	15	22	+2	34
Alexandre Texier^{†}	43	8	12	20	+9	24
Kirby Dach	37	8	7	15	−2	31
Phillip Danault^{†}	45	6	6	12	−6	20
Jayden Struble	59	2	10	12	+4	58
Kaiden Guhle	39	2	9	11	+5	41
Sammy Blais^{†}	13	2	3	5	+4	6
Joe Veleno	61	2	3	5	−12	19
Arber Xhekaj	65	1	3	4	−8	116
Owen Beck	15	1	0	1	+4	6
Patrik Laine	5	0	1	1	−3	2
Adam Engström	15	0	1	1	+2	8
Jared Davidson	10	0	1	1	−4	10
David Reinbacher	2	0	1	1	0	0
Florian Xhekaj	5	0	1	1	−1	7
Joshua Roy	3	0	0	0	0	2

Playoffs
Player	GP	G	A	Pts	+/−	PIM
Nick Suzuki	19	4	12	16	−8	6
Lane Hutson	19	3	13	16	−3	12
Cole Caufield	19	6	7	13	−10	0
Juraj Slafkovský	19	6	6	12	−9	9
Alex Newhook	19	7	3	10	+3	16
Phillip Danault	19	2	8	10	+3	8
Jake Evans	19	2	8	10	+11	22
Ivan Demidov	19	3	6	9	−1	6
Alexandre Texier	19	4	4	8	+6	4
Kaiden Guhle	19	0	8	8	0	46
Josh Anderson	19	5	2	7	+6	30
Zachary Bolduc	19	3	4	7	−3	22
Alexandre Carrier	19	1	6	7	+2	26
Kirby Dach	19	4	1	5	−1	20
Mike Matheson	19	2	2	4	−1	20
Arber Xhekaj	13	1	1	2	+5	28
Brendan Gallagher	3	1	0	1	+1	0
Joe Veleno	9	0	1	1	−3	0
Noah Dobson	13	0	1	1	−7	2
Jayden Struble	12	0	0	0	+2	14
Oliver Kapanen	7	0	0	0	−2	2

=== Goaltenders ===
Regular season
Player	GP	GS	TOI	W	L	OT	GA	GAA	SA	SV%	SO	G	A	PIM
Jakub Dobeš	43	42	2525:35	29	10	4	117	2.78	1,187	.901	0	0	0	2
Sam Montembeault	25	23	1418:12	10	8	4	81	3.43	635	.872	0	0	0	0
Jacob Fowler	17	17	1010:42	9	6	2	41	2.43	448	.908	1	0	0	0

Playoffs
Player	GP	GS	TOI	W	L	GA	GAA	SA	SV%	SO	G	A	PIM
Jakub Dobeš	19	19	1173:11	9	10	52	2.66	564	.908	0	0	1	8
Jacob Fowler	1	0	8:23	0	0	1	7.16	2	.500	0	0	0	0

^{†}Denotes player spent time with another team before joining the Canadiens. Stats reflect time with the Canadiens only.
^{‡}Denotes player was traded mid-season. Stats reflect time with the Canadiens only.
Bold denotes franchise record.

== Suspensions/fines ==
Player	Explanation	Length	Salary	Date issued	Ref
Arber Xhekaj	Roughing against Sabres forward Sam Carrick	N/A	$3,385.42	May 11, 2026	

== Awards and honours ==
=== Awards ===
Regular season
Player	Award	Awarded	Ref
Jakub Dobeš	NHL Third Star of the Month	November 1, 2025	
Juraj Slafkovský	NHL Third Star of the Week	December 29, 2025	
Ivan Demidov	NHL Rookie of the Month	January 1, 2026	
Cole Caufield	NHL Third Star of the Week	March 23, 2026	
Jakub Dobeš	NHL First Star of the Week	March 30, 2026	
Cole Caufield	Lady Byng Memorial Trophy	June 5, 2026	
Nick Suzuki	Frank J. Selke Trophy	June 5, 2026	
Ivan Demidov	NHL All-Rookie Team	June 12, 2026	
Jakub Dobeš	NHL All-Rookie Team	June 12, 2026	
Cole Caufield	NHL Second All-Star Team	June 12, 2026	

=== Milestones ===
Regular season
Oliver Kapanen	1st career NHL goal	October 8, 2025
Zachary Bolduc	100th career NHL game	October 11, 2025
Alexandre Carrier	300th career NHL game	October 14, 2025
Alex Newhook	300th career NHL game	October 14, 2025
Noah Dobson	400th career NHL game	November 1, 2025
Cole Caufield	300th career NHL game	November 4, 2025
Lane Hutson	100th career NHL game	November 11, 2025
Jared Davidson	1st career NHL game	November 15, 2025
Mike Matheson	200th career NHL assist	November 22, 2025
Florian Xhekaj	1st career NHL game 1st career NHL assist 1st career NHL point	November 22, 2025
Adam Engström	1st career NHL game	November 26, 2025
Nick Suzuki	400th career NHL point	November 26, 2025
Jared Davidson	1st career NHL assist 1st career NHL point	December 7, 2025
Jacob Fowler	1st career NHL game 1st career NHL win	December 11, 2025
Owen Beck	1st career NHL goal	December 20, 2025
Jacob Fowler	1st career NHL shutout	December 20, 2025
Lane Hutson	100th career NHL point	December 20, 2025
Noah Dobson	200th career NHL assist	December 30, 2025
Arber Xhekaj	200th career NHL game	December 30, 2025
Phillip Danault	400th career NHL point	January 4, 2026
Alexandre Texier	100th career NHL point	January 7, 2026
Alexandre Texier	1st career NHL hat-trick	January 8, 2026
Nick Suzuki	500th career NHL game	January 10, 2026
Alexandre Carrier	100th career NHL point	January 12, 2026
Lane Hutson	100th career NHL assist	January 15, 2026
Jake Evans	400th career NHL game	March 11, 2026
Kirby Dach	300th career NHL game	March 14, 2026
Juraj Slafkovsky	100th career NHL assist	March 15, 2026
Brendan Gallagher	900th career NHL game	March 17, 2026
Kaiden Guhle	200th career NHL game	March 26, 2026
Nick Suzuki	300th career NHL assist	March 28, 2026
Cole Caufield	300th career NHL point	March 31, 2026
Mike Matheson	300th career NHL point	March 31, 2026
Mike Matheson	700th career NHL game	April 4, 2026
Adam Engstrom	1st career NHL assist 1st career NHL point	April 6, 2026
Jake Evans	100th career NHL assist	April 11, 2026
David Reinbacher	1st career NHL game 1st career NHL assist 1st career NHL point	April 12, 2026
Oliver Kapanen	100th career NHL game	April 14, 2026

== Transactions ==
The Canadiens have been involved in the following transactions during the 2025–26 season.

=== Key ===
† Contract is entry-level.
‡ Contract initially takes effect in the 2026–27 season.

=== Trades ===
Date	Details		Ref
June 27, 2025	To New York Islanders CGY 1st-round pick in 2025 (16th overall); 1st-round pick in 2025 (17th overall); Emil Heineman	To Montreal Canadiens Noah Dobson	
June 28, 2025	To Carolina Hurricanes PIT 2nd-round pick in 2025 (41st overall); 2nd-round pick in 2025 (49th overall)	To Montreal Canadiens CHI 2nd-round pick in 2025 (34th overall); 6th-round pick in 2025 (189th overall)	
June 28, 2025	To Boston Bruins VAN 3rd-round pick in 2025 (79th overall); DET 4th-round pick in 2025 (108th overall)	To Montreal Canadiens 3rd-round pick in 2025 (69th overall)	
June 30, 2025	To Carolina Hurricanes Cayden Primeau	To Montreal Canadiens 7th-round pick in 2026	
July 1, 2025	To St. Louis Blues Logan Mailloux	To Montreal Canadiens Zachary Bolduc	
September 5, 2025	To San Jose Sharks Carey Price; 5th-round pick in 2026	To Montreal Canadiens Gannon Laroque	
December 19, 2025	To Los Angeles Kings CBJ 2nd-round pick in 2026	To Montreal Canadiens Phillip Danault	
March 13, 2026	To Ottawa Senators Riley Kidney	To Montreal Canadiens Jake Chiasson; Hunter Shepard	

=== Players acquired ===
Date	Player	Former team (League)	Term	Via	Ref
July 1, 2025	Alex Belzile	New York Rangers	1-year	Free agency	
July 1, 2025	Sammy Blais	St. Louis Blues	1-year	Free agency	
July 1, 2025	Nate Clurman	Pittsburgh Penguins	1-year	Free agency	
July 1, 2025	Kaapo Kähkönen	Florida Panthers	1-year	Free agency	
July 2, 2025	Marc Del Gaizo	Nashville Predators	1-year	Free agency	
July 16, 2025	Joe Veleno	Seattle Kraken	1-year	Free agency	
November 23, 2025	Alexandre Texier	St. Louis Blues	1-year	Free agency	
November 27, 2025	Sammy Blais	Toronto Maple Leafs		Waivers	

=== Players lost ===
Date	Player	New team (League)	Term	Via	Ref
July 1, 2025	Joel Armia	Los Angeles Kings	2-year	Free agency	
July 1, 2025	Christian Dvorak	Philadelphia Flyers	1-year	Free agency	
July 1, 2025	Michael Pezzetta	Toronto Maple Leafs	2-year	Free agency	
July 2, 2025	Rafaël Harvey-Pinard	Pittsburgh Penguins	1-year	Free agency	
July 4, 2025	Alex Barré-Boulet	Colorado Avalanche	1-year	Free agency	
July 5, 2025	Xavier Simoneau	Laval Rocket (AHL)	1-year	Free agency	
July 11, 2025	Noel Hoefenmayer	HC Sochi (KHL)	1-year	Free agency	
October 6, 2025	Sammy Blais	Toronto Maple Leafs		Waivers	
June 12, 2026	Nate Clurman	Rögle BK (SHL)	1-year	Free agency	

=== Signings ===
Date	Player	Term	Ref
June 27, 2025	Noah Dobson	8-year	
July 2, 2025	Sean Farrell	1-year	
July 3, 2025	William Trudeau	1-year	
July 6, 2025	Jakub Dobeš	2-year	
July 28, 2025	Jayden Struble	2-year	
October 13, 2025	Lane Hutson	8-year^{‡}	
November 28, 2025	Mike Matheson	5-year^{‡}	
December 24, 2025	Bryce Pickford	3-year^{†}	
January 14, 2026	Alexandre Texier	2-year^{‡}	
March 13, 2026	Luke Mittelstadt	2-year^{†}	
March 27, 2026	Owen Protz	3-year^{†}	

== Draft picks ==
Below are the Montreal Canadiens' selections at the 2025 NHL entry draft, which was held on June 27–28, 2025, at the Peacock Theater in Los Angeles, California.

Round	#	Player	Pos.	Nationality	Team (League)
2	34 (Note: The Chicago Blackhawks' second-round pick went to Montreal as the result of a trade on June 28, 2025 that sent Pittsburgh's second-round pick in 2025 (41st overall) and a second-round pick in 2025 (49th overall) to Carolina in exchange for a sixth-round pick in 2025 (189th overall), and this pick. Carolina previously acquired this pick as the result of a trade on June 27, 2025 that sent a first-round pick in 2025 (29th overall) to Chicago in exchange for Dallas's second-round pick in 2025 (62nd overall), a fifth-round pick in 2027, and this pick.)	Alexander Zharovsky	RW	Russia	Tolpar Ufa (MHL)
3	69 (Note: The Boston Bruins' third-round pick went to Montreal as a result of a trade on June 28, 2025 that sent Vancouver's third-round pick and Detroit's fourth-round pick both in 2025 (79th and 108th overall) to Boston in exchange for this pick.)	Hayden Paupanekis	C	Canada	Kelowna Rockets (WHL)
3	81	Bryce Pickford	D	Canada	Medicine Hat Tigers (WHL)
3	82 (Note: The New Jersey Devils' third-round pick went to Montreal as the result of a trade on March 8, 2024 that sent Jake Allen to New Jersey in exchange for this pick (being conditional at the time of the trade). The condition – Montreal would receive a second-round pick in 2025 if Allen played in more than 40 games during the 2024–25 NHL season – was not converted when it became unfeasible for Allen to reach this threshold based on remaining team schedule in mid-March 2025.)	Arseny Radkov	G	Belarus	Tyumensky Legion (MHL)
4	113	John Mooney	C	United States	U.S. National Team Development Program (USHL)
5	145	Alexis Cournoyer	G	Canada	Cape Breton Eagles (QMJHL)
6	177	Carlos Händel	D	Germany	Halifax Mooseheads (QMJHL)
6	189 (Note: The Carolina Hurricanes' sixth-round pick went to Montreal as the result of a trade on June 28, 2025 that sent Pittsburgh's second-round pick in 2025 (41st overall) and a second-round pick in 2025 (49th overall) to Carolina in exchange for Chicago's second-round pick in 2025 (34th overall), and this pick.)	Andrew MacNiel	D	Canada	Kitchener Rangers (OHL)
7	209	Max Vig	D	United States	Cedar Rapids RoughRiders (USHL)
