= 2025–26 Boston Bruins season =

National Hockey League team season

2025–26 Boston Bruins
- Division: 4th Atlantic
- Conference: 5th Eastern
- 2025–26 record: 45–27–10
- Home record: 29–11–1
- Road record: 16–16–9
- Goals for: 272
- Goals against: 250

Team information
- General manager: Don Sweeney
- Coach: Marco Sturm
- Captain: Vacant
- Alternate captains: Hampus Lindholm; Charlie McAvoy; David Pastrnak
- Arena: TD Garden
- Minor league affiliates: Providence Bruins (AHL); Maine Mariners (ECHL)

Team leaders
- Goals: Morgan Geekie (39)
- Assists: David Pastrnak (71)
- Points: David Pastrnak (100)
- Penalty minutes: Nikita Zadorov (152)
- Plus/minus: Jonathan Aspirot (+30)
- Wins: Jeremy Swayman (31)
- Goals against average: Jeremy Swayman (2.71)

The 2025–26 Boston Bruins season was the 102nd season (101st season of play) for the National Hockey League (NHL) franchise that was established on November 1, 1924.

During the off-season, the Bruins hired former player Marco Sturm as their head coach, replacing Joe Sacco, who was serving on an interim basis after the firing of Jim Montgomery during the previous season. The Bruins entered the season coming off the first time they had missed the Stanley Cup playoffs since the 2015–16 season.

The Bruins entered the season without naming a captain, the first time they had done so since the 2001–02 season. Instead, David Pastrnak, Charlie McAvoy, and Hampus Lindholm were named as three alternate captains prior to the season beginning.

On April 11, 2026, the Bruins clinched a playoff spot after a one-year absence and clinching a playoff spot in nine of ten seasons following losses by the New York Islanders and Detroit Red Wings. They faced the Buffalo Sabres in the first round of the Stanley Cup playoffs, losing in six games.

== Standings ==
=== Divisional standings ===
Atlantic Division
Pos	Team	GP	W	L	OTL	RW	GF	GA	GD	Pts
1	y – Buffalo Sabres	82	50	23	9	42	288	241	+47	109
2	x – Tampa Bay Lightning	82	50	26	6	40	290	231	+59	106
3	x – Montreal Canadiens	82	48	24	10	34	283	256	+27	106
4	x – Boston Bruins	82	45	27	10	33	272	250	+22	100
5	x – Ottawa Senators	82	44	27	11	38	278	246	+32	99
6	Detroit Red Wings	82	41	31	10	30	241	258	−17	92
7	Florida Panthers	82	40	38	4	32	251	276	−25	84
8	Toronto Maple Leafs	82	32	36	14	23	253	299	−46	78

Source: National Hockey League
Rules for classification: 1) Fewer number of games played (GP, only during regular season); 2) Greater number of regulation wins (RW); 3) Greater number of wins in regulation and overtime, excluding shootout wins (ROW); 4) Greater number of total wins, including shootouts (W); 5) Greater number of points earned in head-to-head play; if teams played an uneven number of head-to-head games, the result of the first game on the home ice of the team with the extra home game is discarded; 6) Greater goal differential (GD); 7) Greater number of goals scored (GF)
x – Clinched playoff spot; y – Clinched division

=== Conference standings ===
Eastern Conference Wild Card
Pos	Div	Team	GP	W	L	OTL	RW	GF	GA	GD	Pts
1	AT	x – Boston Bruins	82	45	27	10	33	272	250	+22	100
2	AT	x – Ottawa Senators	82	44	27	11	38	278	246	+32	99
3	ME	Washington Capitals	82	43	30	9	37	263	244	+19	95
4	AT	Detroit Red Wings	82	41	31	10	30	241	258	−17	92
5	ME	Columbus Blue Jackets	82	40	30	12	28	253	253	0	92
6	ME	New York Islanders	82	43	34	5	29	233	241	−8	91
7	ME	New Jersey Devils	82	42	37	3	29	230	254	−24	87
8	AT	Florida Panthers	82	40	38	4	32	251	276	−25	84
9	AT	Toronto Maple Leafs	82	32	36	14	23	253	299	−46	78
10	ME	New York Rangers	82	34	39	9	25	238	250	−12	77

Source: National Hockey League
Rules for classification: 1) Fewer number of games played (GP, only during regular season); 2) Greater number of regulation wins (RW); 3) Greater number of wins in regulation and overtime, excluding shootout wins (ROW); 4) Greater number of total wins, including shootouts (W); 5) Greater number of points earned in head-to-head play; if teams played an uneven number of head-to-head games, the result of the first game on the home ice of the team with the extra home game is discarded; 6) Greater goal differential (GD); 7) Greater number of goals scored (GF)
x – Clinched playoff spot

== Schedule and results ==
=== Preseason ===
The Bruins revealed their preseason schedule on June 24, 2025.

2025 preseason game log: 4–1–1 (home: 1–1–1; road: 3–0–0)
#	Date	Visitor	Score	Home	OT	Decision	Attendance	Record	Recap
1	September 21	Washington	5–2	Boston		Dipietro	17,850	0–1–0
2	September 23	Boston	5–4	NY Rangers		Korpisalo	16,149	1–1–0
3	September 27	Boston	4–3	Philadelphia		Dipietro	14,084	2–1–0
4	September 29	Philadelphia	3–2	Boston	SO	Swayman	17,850	2–1–1
5	October 2	Boston	3–1	Washington		Korpisalo	11,304	3–1–1
6	October 4	NY Rangers	1–4	Boston		Swayman	17,850	4–1–1

=== Regular season ===
The Bruins revealed their regular season schedule on July 16, 2025.

2025–26 game log

October: 6–7–0 (Home: 5–3–0; Road: 1–4–0)
#	Date	Visitor	Score	Home	OT	Decision	Attendance	Record	Pts	Recap
1	October 8	Boston	3–1	Washington		Swayman	18,347	1–0–0	2
2	October 9	Chicago	3–4	Boston	OT	Korpisalo	17,850	2–0–0	4
3	October 11	Buffalo	1–3	Boston		Swayman	17,850	3–0–0	6
4	October 13	Tampa Bay	4–3	Boston		Korpisalo	17,850	3–1–0	6
5	October 16	Boston	5–6	Vegas		Swayman	17,927	3–2–0	6
6	October 18	Boston	1–4	Colorado		Swayman	18,131	3–3–0	6
7	October 19	Boston	2–3	Utah		Korpisalo	12,478	3–4–0	6
8	October 21	Florida	4–3	Boston		Swayman	17,850	3–5–0	6
9	October 23	Anaheim	7–5	Boston		Korpisalo	17,850	3–6–0	6
10	October 25	Colorado	2–3	Boston		Swayman	17,850	4–6–0	8
11	October 27	Boston	2–7	Ottawa		Swayman	16,168	4–7–0	8
12	October 28	NY Islanders	2–5	Boston		Korpisalo	17,850	5–7–0	10
13	October 30	Buffalo	3–4	Boston	OT	Korpisalo	17,850	6–7–0	12

November: 9–5–0 (Home: 4–2–0; Road: 5–3–0)
#	Date	Visitor	Score	Home	OT	Decision	Attendance	Record	Pts	Recap
14	November 1	Carolina	1–2	Boston		Swayman	17,850	7–7–0	14
15	November 4	Boston	4–3	NY Islanders	SO	Swayman	15,585	8–7–0	16
16	November 6	Ottawa	2–3	Boston	OT	Korpisalo	17,850	9–7–0	18
17	November 8	Boston	5–3	Toronto		Swayman	18,955	10–7–0	20
18	November 11	Toronto	3–5	Boston		Swayman	17,850	11–7–0	22
19	November 13	Boston	3–5	Ottawa		Korpisalo	16,049	11–8–0	22
20	November 15	Boston	3–2	Montreal		Swayman	20,962	12–8–0	24
21	November 17	Carolina	3–1	Boston		Swayman	17,850	12–9–0	24
22	November 19	Boston	3–4	Anaheim		Korpisalo	14,067	12–10–0	24
23	November 21	Boston	2–1	Los Angeles	OT	Swayman	18,145	13–10–0	26
24	November 23	Boston	1–3	San Jose		Swayman	17,435	13–11–0	26
25	November 26	Boston	3–1	NY Islanders		Swayman	17,255	14–11–0	28
26	November 28	NY Rangers	6–2	Boston		Korpisalo	17,850	14–12–0	28
27	November 29	Detroit	2–3	Boston	SO	Swayman	17,850	15–12–0	30

December: 6–6–2 (Home: 3–3–1; Road: 3–3–1)
#	Date	Visitor	Score	Home	OT	Decision	Attendance	Record	Pts	Recap
28	December 2	Boston	4–5	Detroit		Swayman	18,803	15–13–0	30
29	December 4	St. Louis	2–5	Boston		Korpisalo	17,850	16–13–0	32
30	December 6	New Jersey	1–4	Boston		Swayman	17,850	17–13–0	34
31	December 9	Boston	5–2	St. Louis		Swayman	18,096	18–13–0	36
32	December 11	Boston	6–3	Winnipeg		Korpisalo	13,158	19–13–0	38
33	December 14	Boston	2–6	Minnesota		Swayman	18,322	19–14–0	38
34	December 16	Utah	1–4	Boston		Swayman	17,850	20–14–0	40
35	December 18	Edmonton	3–1	Boston		Swayman	17,850	20–15–0	40
36	December 20	Vancouver	5–4	Boston	SO	Swayman	17,850	20–15–1	41
37	December 21	Ottawa	6–2	Boston		Korpisalo	17,850	20–16–1	41
38	December 23	Montreal	5–2	Boston		Swayman	17,850	20–17–1	41
39	December 27	Boston	1–4	Buffalo		Korpisalo	19,070	20–18–1	41
40	December 29	Boston	1–2	Calgary	OT	Swayman	17,536	20–18–2	42
41	December 31	Boston	6–2	Edmonton		Swayman	18,347	21–18–2	44

January: 11–2–1 (Home: 9–0–0; Road: 2–2–1)
#	Date	Visitor	Score	Home	OT	Decision	Attendance	Record	Pts	Recap
42	January 3	Boston	3–2	Vancouver	OT	Swayman	18,665	22–18–2	46
43	January 6	Boston	4–7	Seattle		Swayman	17,151	22–19–2	46
44	January 8	Calgary	1–4	Boston		Korpisalo	17,850	23–19–2	48
45	January 10	NY Rangers	2–10	Boston		Swayman	17,850	24–19–2	50
46	January 11	Pittsburgh	0–1	Boston		Korpisalo	17,850	25–19–2	52
47	January 13	Detroit	0–3	Boston		Swayman	17,850	26–19–2	54
48	January 15	Seattle	2–4	Boston		Swayman	17,850	27–19–2	56
49	January 17	Boston	5–2	Chicago		Korpisalo	20,388	28–19–2	58
50	January 20	Boston	2–6	Dallas		Swayman	18,532	28–20–2	58
51	January 22	Vegas	3–4	Boston		Korpisalo	17,850	29–20–2	60
52	January 24	Montreal	3–4	Boston		Swayman	17,850	30–20–2	62
53	January 26	Boston	3–4	NY Rangers	OT	Korpisalo	17,469	30–20–3	63
54	January 27	Nashville	2–3	Boston	OT	Swayman	17,850	31–20–3	65
55	January 29	Philadelphia	3–6	Boston		Swayman	17,850	32–20–3	67

February: 1–1–2 (Home: 1–0–0; Road: 0–1–2)
#	Date	Visitor	Score	Home	OT	Decision	Attendance	Record	Pts	Recap
56	February 1	Boston	5–6	Tampa Bay	SO	Swayman	64,617 (outdoors)	32–20–4	68
57	February 4	Boston	4–5	Florida	SO	Korpisalo	18,843	32–20–5	69
58	February 26	Columbus	2–4	Boston		Korpisalo	17,850	33–20–5	71
59	February 28	Boston	1–3	Philadelphia		Swayman	19,872	33–21–5	71

March: 10–3–3 (Home: 6–2–0; Road: 4–1–3)
#	Date	Visitor	Score	Home	OT	Decision	Attendance	Record	Pts	Recap
60	March 3	Pittsburgh	1–2	Boston		Swayman	17,850	34–21–5	73
61	March 5	Boston	3–6	Nashville		Korpisalo	17,330	34–22–5	73
62	March 7	Washington	1–3	Boston		Swayman	17,850	35–22–5	75
63	March 8	Boston	4–5	Pittsburgh	OT	Korpisalo	18,029	35–22–6	76
64	March 10	Los Angeles	1–2	Boston	OT	Swayman	17,850	36–22–6	78
65	March 12	San Jose	4–2	Boston		Swayman	17,850	36–23–6	78
66	March 14	Boston	3–2	Washington	SO	Swayman	18,347	37–23–6	80
67	March 16	Boston	3–4	New Jersey	OT	Korpisalo	16,034	37–23–7	81
68	March 17	Boston	2–3	Montreal	OT	Swayman	20,962	37–23–8	82
69	March 19	Winnipeg	1–6	Boston		Swayman	17,850	38–23–8	84
70	March 21	Boston	4–2	Detroit		Swayman	19,515	39–23–8	86
71	March 24	Toronto	4–2	Boston		Swayman	17,850	39–24–8	86
72	March 25	Boston	4–3	Buffalo	OT	Korpisalo	19,070	40–24–8	88
73	March 28	Minnesota	3–6	Boston		Swayman	17,850	41–24–8	90
74	March 29	Boston	4–3	Columbus	SO	Swayman	18,684	42–24–8	92
75	March 31	Dallas	3–6	Boston		Korpisalo	17,850	43–24–8	94

April: 2–3–2 (Home: 1–1–0; Road: 1–2–2)
#	Date	Visitor	Score	Home	OT	Decision	Attendance	Record	Pts	Recap
76	April 2	Boston	1–2	Florida		Swayman	19,823	43–25–8	94
77	April 4	Boston	1–3	Tampa Bay		Swayman	19,092	43–26–8	94
78	April 5	Boston	1–2	Philadelphia	OT	Korpisalo	19,133	43–26–9	95
79	April 7	Boston	5–6	Carolina	OT	Korpisalo	18,571	43–26–10	96
80	April 11	Tampa Bay	2–1	Boston		Swayman	17,850	43–27–10	96
81	April 12	Boston	3–2	Columbus		Korpisalo	18,532	44–27–10	98
82	April 14	New Jersey	0–4	Boston		Swayman	17,850	45–27–10	100

Legend: Win (2 points) Loss (0 points) Overtime/shootout loss (1 point)

=== Playoffs ===
2026 Stanley Cup playoffs

Eastern Conference First Round vs. (A1) Buffalo Sabres: Buffalo won 4–2
#	Date	Visitor	Score	Home	OT	Decision	Attendance	Series	Recap
1	April 19	Boston	3–4	Buffalo		Swayman	19,070	0–1
2	April 21	Boston	4–2	Buffalo		Swayman	19,070	1–1
3	April 23	Buffalo	3–1	Boston		Swayman	17,850	1–2
4	April 26	Buffalo	6–1	Boston		Swayman	17,850	1–3
5	April 28	Boston	2–1	Buffalo	OT	Swayman	19,070	2–3
6	May 1	Buffalo	4–1	Boston		Swayman	17,850	4–2

Legend: Win Loss

== Player statistics ==
As of game played on May 1, 2026

=== Skaters ===
Regular season
Player	GP	G	A	Pts	+/−	PIM
David Pastrnak	77	29	71	100	+4	72
Morgan Geekie	81	39	29	68	−5	22
Pavel Zacha	78	30	35	65	+4	28
Charlie McAvoy	69	11	50	61	+13	62
Viktor Arvidsson	69	25	29	54	+20	24
Elias Lindholm	69	17	31	48	−7	38
Casey Mittelstadt	71	15	27	42	+12	12
Fraser Minten	82	17	18	35	+21	20
Marat Khusnutdinov	77	15	18	33	+12	16
Mason Lohrei	73	7	19	26	+17	20
Hampus Lindholm	67	5	21	26	+3	58
Mark Kastelic	82	12	10	22	+6	140
Sean Kuraly	82	6	16	22	0	41
Tanner Jeannot	77	6	16	22	−4	66
Nikita Zadorov	81	2	20	22	+18	152
Michael Eyssimont	56	8	10	18	−3	31
Alex Steeves	43	9	7	16	+6	34
Henri Jokiharju	41	2	13	15	+2	14
Andrew Peeke	77	5	9	14	−12	22
Jonathan Aspirot	61	3	10	13	+30	43
Jordan Harris	8	1	2	3	0	0
Lukas Reichel^{†}	10	1	2	3	+2	0
Riley Tufte	4	1	0	1	−1	0
John Beecher^{‡}	6	1	0	1	−1	0
Matthew Poitras	3	1	0	1	+1	4
Victor Soderstrom	8	0	1	1	+3	0
James Hagens	2	0	1	1	+1	2
Jeffrey Viel^{‡}	10	0	0	0	−1	30
Michael Callahan	5	0	0	0	−1	0
Vladislav Kolyachonok^{†}	2	0	0	0	−1	0
Matej Blumel	4	0	0	0	−3	0
Georgii Merkulov	1	0	0	0	−1	0

Playoffs
Player	GP	G	A	Pts	+/−	PIM
David Pastrnak	6	3	4	7	−7	8
Morgan Geekie	6	2	2	4	−1	6
Pavel Zacha	6	1	2	3	−7	2
Elias Lindholm	6	2	0	2	−3	2
Viktor Arvidsson	4	2	0	2	−4	0
Sean Kuraly	6	1	1	2	+1	2
Hampus Lindholm	6	0	2	2	−4	8
Charlie McAvoy	6	0	2	2	−6	19
Casey Mittelstadt	6	0	2	2	−4	0
Jonathan Aspirot	6	0	2	2	−3	2
Tanner Jeannot	6	1	0	1	0	6
Nikita Zadorov	6	0	1	1	−1	37
Andrew Peeke	6	0	1	1	+2	14
Mark Kastelic	6	0	1	1	+1	11
Michael Eyssimont	2	0	0	0	0	0
Henri Jokiharju	2	0	0	0	+1	0
Jordan Harris	1	0	0	0	−2	0
Lukas Reichel	1	0	0	0	−2	0
Marat Khusnutdinov	6	0	0	0	−2	2
Mason Lohrei	3	0	0	0	−4	0
Alex Steeves	2	0	0	0	0	0
Fraser Minten	6	0	0	0	−2	0
James Hagens	3	0	0	0	−2	2

=== Goaltenders ===
Regular season
Player	GP	GS	TOI	W	L	OT	GA	GAA	SA	SV%	SO	G	A	PIM
Jeremy Swayman	55	54	3235:17	31	18	4	146	2.71	1571	.908	2	0	0	11
Joonas Korpisalo	31	28	1713:05	14	9	6	90	3.15	851	.894	1	0	0	2
Michael DiPietro	1	0	6:03	0	0	0	0	0.00	2	1.000	0	0	0	0

Playoffs
Player	GP	GS	TOI	W	L	GA	GAA	SA	SV%	SO	G	A	PIM
Jeremy Swayman	6	6	350:31	2	4	17	2.91	181	.906	0	0	0	0
Joonas Korpisalo	1	0	13:19	0	0	0	0.00	6	1.000	0	0	0	0

^{†}Denotes player spent time with another team before joining the Bruins. Stats reflect time with the Bruins only.
^{‡}Denotes player was traded mid-season. Stats reflect time with the Bruins only.

== Transactions ==
The Bruins have been involved in the following transactions during the 2025–26 season.

Key:

† Contract is entry-level.
‡ Contract initially takes effect in the 2026–27 season.

=== Trades ===
Date	Details		Ref
June 28, 2025	To Montreal Canadiens 3rd-round pick in 2025 (#69 overall)	To Boston Bruins VAN 3rd-round pick in 2025 (#79 overall) DET 4th-round pick in 2025 (#108 overall)	
June 28, 2025	To Tampa Bay Lightning DET 4th-round pick in 2025 (#108 overall)	To Boston Bruins 4th-round pick in 2026	
July 1, 2025	To Edmonton Oilers 5th-round pick in 2027	To Boston Bruins Viktor Arvidsson	
March 6, 2026	To Boston Bruins Alexis Gendron Massimo Rizzo	To Philadelphia Flyers Jackson Edward Brett Harrison	
March 12, 2026	To Boston Bruins Navrin Mutter	To Nashville Predators Dalton Bancroft Massimo Rizzo	

=== Players acquired ===
Date	Player	Former team	Term	Via	Ref
July 1, 2025	Jonathan Aspirot	Calgary Flames	1-year	Free agency	
July 1, 2025	Matěj Blümel	Dallas Stars	1-year	Free agency	
July 1, 2025	Luke Cavallin	Laval Rocket (AHL)	1-year	Free agency	
July 1, 2025	Mikey Eyssimont	Seattle Kraken	2-year	Free agency	
July 1, 2025	Jordan Harris	Columbus Blue Jackets	1-year	Free agency	
July 1, 2025	Tanner Jeannot	Los Angeles Kings	5-year	Free agency	
July 1, 2025	Sean Kuraly	Columbus Blue Jackets	2-year	Free agency	
July 1, 2025	Alex Steeves	Toronto Maple Leafs	1-year	Free agency	
December 16, 2025	Vladislav Kolyachonok	Dallas Stars		Waivers	

=== Players lost ===
Date	Player	New team	Term	Via	Ref
July 1, 2025	Brandon Bussi	Florida Panthers	1-year	Free agency	
July 1, 2025	Cole Koepke	Winnipeg Jets	1-year	Free agency	
July 1, 2025	Vinni Lettieri	Toronto Maple Leafs	1-year	Free agency	
July 1, 2025	Ian Mitchell	Detroit Red Wings	1-year	Free agency	
July 1, 2025	Tyler Pitlick	Minnesota Wild	2-year	Free agency	
July 1, 2025	Parker Wotherspoon	Pittsburgh Penguins	1-year	Free agency	
January 21, 2026	Vladislav Kolyachonok	Dallas Stars		Waivers	

=== Signings ===
Date	Player	Term	Ref
June 23, 2025	Mason Lohrei	2-year	
June 29, 2025	Michael Callahan	1-year	
June 29, 2025	Morgan Geekie	6-year	
June 29, 2025	Marat Khusnutdinov	2-year	
June 30, 2025	John Beecher	1-year	
June 30, 2025	Michael DiPietro	2-year	
June 30, 2025	Henri Jokiharju	3-year	
June 30, 2025	Georgii Merkulov	1-year	
July 1, 2025	Riley Tufte	1-year	
July 15, 2025	John Farinacci	1-year	

== Draft picks ==
Round	#	Player	Pos	Nationality	College/Junior/Club team (League)
1	7	James Hagens	C	United States	Boston College (NCAA)
2	51	William Moore	C	United States	U.S. NTDP (USHL)
2	61	Liam Pettersson	C	Sweden	Växjö Lakers (J20 Nationell)
3	79	Cooper Simpson	LW	United States	Tri-City Storm (USHL)
4	100	Vasek Blanar	D	Czech Republic	HV71 (J20 Nationell)
5	133	Cole Chandler	C	Canada	Shawinigan Cataractes (QMJHL)
6	165	Kirill Yemelyanov	C	Russia	Lokomotiv Yaroslavl (MHL)
