= 2025–26 Toronto Maple Leafs season =

National Hockey League season

2025–26 Toronto Maple Leafs
- Division: 8th Atlantic
- Conference: 15th Eastern
- 2025–26 record: 32–36–14
- Home record: 18–15–8
- Road record: 14–21–6
- Goals for: 253
- Goals against: 299

Team information
- General manager: Brad Treliving (Oct. 8 – Mar. 30)
- Coach: Craig Berube
- Captain: Auston Matthews
- Alternate captains: Morgan Rielly; John Tavares
- Arena: Scotiabank Arena
- Minor league affiliates: Toronto Marlies (AHL); Cincinnati Cyclones (ECHL)

Team leaders
- Goals: John Tavares (31)
- Assists: William Nylander (49)
- Points: William Nylander (79)
- Penalty minutes: Max Domi (95)
- Plus/minus: Chris Tanev (+8)
- Wins: Joseph Woll (15)
- Goals against average: Dennis Hildeby (2.86)

The 2025–26 Toronto Maple Leafs season was the franchise's 109th season (108th season of play) in the National Hockey League (NHL).

The Maple Leafs fell heavily from their record of 52–26–4 (108 points) the year prior, setting a franchise-record decline of 30 points (78 total) in a single season. The team struggled to produce their regular offensive numbers, especially following the sign and trade deal from the off-season that resulted in star player Mitch Marner joining the Vegas Golden Knights. Along with a lacking defensive core and injuries to Anthony Stolarz and Chris Tanev, the Maple Leafs finished with a goal differential of –46 (83-goal swing) and league-leading 2,660 shots against. The season was also the first without Brendan Shanahan as president of hockey operations since the 2013–14 season.

On March 13, 2026, following a hit from Anaheim Ducks defenceman Radko Gudas, it was announced that team captain Auston Matthews would be out for the remainder of the season due to a tear of his medial collateral ligament (MCL).

On March 30, the team fired general manager Brad Treliving after going 31–30–13 on the season.

Following a loss to the San Jose Sharks, and after wins by the Detroit Red Wings and Ottawa Senators on April 2, the Maple Leafs were eliminated from playoff contention for the first time since the 2015–16 season, ending the longest active playoff streak in the NHL.

The Maple Leafs finished the season with a 32–36–14 record. Their season ended on April 15, in a 3–1 loss to the Ottawa Senators, closing on a seven-game losing streak for the first time since the 1957–58 season. The team went from first in the Atlantic Division the previous year to eighth place, allowing 295 goals, the highest since the 1990–91 season.

On May 13, the team fired head coach Craig Berube.

== Standings ==
=== Divisional standings ===
Atlantic Division
Pos	Team	GP	W	L	OTL	RW	GF	GA	GD	Pts
1	y – Buffalo Sabres	82	50	23	9	42	288	241	+47	109
2	x – Tampa Bay Lightning	82	50	26	6	40	290	231	+59	106
3	x – Montreal Canadiens	82	48	24	10	34	283	256	+27	106
4	x – Boston Bruins	82	45	27	10	33	272	250	+22	100
5	x – Ottawa Senators	82	44	27	11	38	278	246	+32	99
6	Detroit Red Wings	82	41	31	10	30	241	258	−17	92
7	Florida Panthers	82	40	38	4	32	251	276	−25	84
8	Toronto Maple Leafs	82	32	36	14	23	253	299	−46	78

Source: National Hockey League
Rules for classification: 1) Fewer number of games played (GP, only during regular season); 2) Greater number of regulation wins (RW); 3) Greater number of wins in regulation and overtime, excluding shootout wins (ROW); 4) Greater number of total wins, including shootouts (W); 5) Greater number of points earned in head-to-head play; if teams played an uneven number of head-to-head games, the result of the first game on the home ice of the team with the extra home game is discarded; 6) Greater goal differential (GD); 7) Greater number of goals scored (GF)
x – Clinched playoff spot; y – Clinched division

=== Conference standings ===
Eastern Conference Wild Card
Pos	Div	Team	GP	W	L	OTL	RW	GF	GA	GD	Pts
1	AT	x – Boston Bruins	82	45	27	10	33	272	250	+22	100
2	AT	x – Ottawa Senators	82	44	27	11	38	278	246	+32	99
3	ME	Washington Capitals	82	43	30	9	37	263	244	+19	95
4	AT	Detroit Red Wings	82	41	31	10	30	241	258	−17	92
5	ME	Columbus Blue Jackets	82	40	30	12	28	253	253	0	92
6	ME	New York Islanders	82	43	34	5	29	233	241	−8	91
7	ME	New Jersey Devils	82	42	37	3	29	230	254	−24	87
8	AT	Florida Panthers	82	40	38	4	32	251	276	−25	84
9	AT	Toronto Maple Leafs	82	32	36	14	23	253	299	−46	78
10	ME	New York Rangers	82	34	39	9	25	238	250	−12	77

Source: National Hockey League
Rules for classification: 1) Fewer number of games played (GP, only during regular season); 2) Greater number of regulation wins (RW); 3) Greater number of wins in regulation and overtime, excluding shootout wins (ROW); 4) Greater number of total wins, including shootouts (W); 5) Greater number of points earned in head-to-head play; if teams played an uneven number of head-to-head games, the result of the first game on the home ice of the team with the extra home game is discarded; 6) Greater goal differential (GD); 7) Greater number of goals scored (GF)
x – Clinched playoff spot

== Schedule and results ==
=== Preseason ===
2025 preseason game log: 2–2–2 (Home: 0–2–1; Road: 2–0–1)
#	Date	Visitor	Score	Home	OT	Decision	Location	Attendance	Record	Recap
1	September 21	Toronto	4–3	Ottawa		Akhtyamov (1–0–0)	Canadian Tire Centre	16,254	1–0–0
2	September 23	Ottawa	3–2	Toronto	OT	Akhtyamov (1–0–1)	Scotiabank Arena	15,162	1–0–1
3	September 25	Toronto	7–2	Montreal		Hildeby (1–0–0)	Bell Centre	20,962	2–0–1
4	September 27	Montreal	4–2	Toronto		Stolarz (0–1–0)	Scotiabank Arena	18,216	2–1–1
5	October 2	Detroit	3–1	Toronto		Stolarz (0–2–0)	Scotiabank Arena	17,846	2–2–1
6	October 4	Toronto	5–6	Detroit	OT	Reimer (0–0–1)	Little Caesars Arena	17,724	2–2–2

=== Regular season ===
2025–26 Game Log: 32–36–14, 78 points (home: 18–15–8; road: 14–21–6)

October: 5–5–1, 11 points (Home: 5–2–1; Road: 0–3–0)
#	Date	Visitor	Score	Home	OT	Decision	Attendance	Record	Pts	Recap
1	October 8	Montreal	2–5	Toronto		Stolarz (1–0–0)	19,037	1–0–0	2
2	October 11	Toronto	3–6	Detroit		Stolarz (1–1–0)	19,515	1–1–0	2
3	October 13	Detroit	3–2	Toronto		Stolarz (1–2–0)	18,877	1–2–0	2
4	October 14	Nashville	4–7	Toronto		Primeau (1–0–0)	18,124	2–2–0	4
5	October 16	NY Rangers	1–2	Toronto	OT	Stolarz (2–2–0)	18,267	3–2–0	6
6	October 18	Seattle	4–3	Toronto	OT	Stolarz (2–2–1)	18,589	3–2–1	7
7	October 21	New Jersey	5–2	Toronto		Stolarz (2–3–1)	18,306	3–3–1	7
8	October 24	Toronto	3–5	Buffalo		Stolarz (2–4–1)	17,211	3–4–1	7
9	October 25	Buffalo	3–4	Toronto	OT	Primeau (2–0–0)	18,792	4–4–1	9
10	October 28	Calgary	3–4	Toronto		Stolarz (3–4–1)	18,454	5–4–1	11
11	October 29	Toronto	3–6	Columbus		Primeau (2–1–0)	16,558	5–5–1	11

November: 6–6–2, 14 points (Home: 3–2–2; Road: 3–4–0)
#	Date	Visitor	Score	Home	OT	Decision	Attendance	Record	Pts	Recap
12	November 1	Toronto	5–2	Philadelphia		Stolarz (4–4–1)	17,846	6–5–1	13
13	November 3	Pittsburgh	3–4	Toronto		Stolarz (5–4–1)	18,916	7–5–1	15
14	November 5	Utah	3–5	Toronto		Stolarz (6–4–1)	18,457	8–5–1	17
15	November 8	Boston	5–3	Toronto		Stolarz (6–5–1)	18,955	8–6–1	17
16	November 9	Carolina	5–4	Toronto		Hildeby (0–1–0)	18,395	8–7–1	17
17	November 11	Toronto	3–5	Boston		Hildeby (0–2–0)	17,850	8–8–1	17
18	November 13	Los Angeles	4–3	Toronto	OT	Hildeby (0–2–1)	18,305	8–8–2	18
19	November 15	Toronto	2–3	Chicago		Woll (0–1–0)	20,489	8–9–2	18
20	November 18	St. Louis	2–3	Toronto	OT	Woll (1–1–0)	18,353	9–9–2	20
21	November 20	Columbus	3–2	Toronto	OT	Woll (1–1–1)	18,438	9–9–3	21
22	November 22	Toronto	2–5	Montreal		Woll (1–2–1)	20,962	9–10–3	21
23	November 26	Toronto	2–1	Columbus	OT	Woll (2–2–1)	16,632	10–10–3	23
24	November 28	Toronto	2–4	Washington		Woll (2–3–1)	18,347	10–11–3	23
25	November 29	Toronto	7–2	Pittsburgh		Hildeby (1–2–1)	17,310	11–11–3	25

December: 7–4–3, 17 points (Home: 5–1–2; Road: 2–3–1)
#	Date	Visitor	Score	Home	OT	Decision	Attendance	Record	Pts	Recap
26	December 2	Toronto	4–1	Florida		Woll (3–3–1)	19,268	12–11–3	27
27	December 4	Toronto	5–1	Carolina		Woll (4–3–1)	18,299	13–11–3	29
28	December 6	Montreal	2–1	Toronto	SO	Hildeby (1–2–2)	19,081	13–11–4	30
29	December 8	Tampa Bay	0–2	Toronto		Hildeby (2–2–2)	18,520	14–11–4	32
30	December 11	San Jose	3–2	Toronto	OT	Hildeby (2–2–3)	18,674	14–11–5	33
31	December 13	Edmonton	6–3	Toronto		Hildeby (2–3–3)	19,023	14–12–5	33
32	December 16	Chicago	2–3	Toronto		Woll (5–3–1)	18,568	15–12–5	35
33	December 18	Toronto	0–4	Washington		Hildeby (2–4–3)	18,347	15–13–5	35
34	December 20	Toronto	3–5	Nashville		Woll (5–4–1)	17,159	15–14–5	35
35	December 21	Toronto	1–5	Dallas		Hildeby (2–5–3)	18,532	15–15–5	35
36	December 23	Pittsburgh	3–6	Toronto		Woll (6–4–1)	18,979	16–15–5	37
37	December 27	Ottawa	5–7	Toronto		Woll (7–4–1)	18,859	17–15–5	39
38	December 28	Toronto	2–3	Detroit	OT	Hildeby (2–5–4)	19,515	17–15–6	40
39	December 30	New Jersey	0–4	Toronto		Woll (8–4–1)	18,923	18–15–6	42

January: 7–6–3, 17 points (Home: 3–4–1; Road: 4–2–2)
#	Date	Visitor	Score	Home	OT	Decision	Attendance	Record	Pts	Recap
40	January 1	Winnipeg	5–6	Toronto		Hildeby (3–5–4)	18,860	19–15–6	44
41	January 3	Toronto	3–4	NY Islanders	OT	Woll (8–4–2)	17,255	19–15–7	45
42	January 6	Florida	1–4	Toronto		Woll (9–4–2)	18,911	20–15–7	47
43	January 8	Toronto	2–1	Philadelphia	OT	Hildeby (4–5–4)	19,546	21–15–7	49
44	January 10	Vancouver	0–5	Toronto		Woll (10–4–2)	19,078	22–15–7	51
45	January 12	Toronto	4–3	Colorado	OT	Woll (11–4–2)	18,084	23–15–7	53
46	January 13	Toronto	1–6	Utah		Hildeby (4–6–4)	12,478	23–16–7	53
47	January 15	Toronto	5–6	Vegas	OT	Woll (11–4–3)	17,975	23–16–8	54
48	January 17	Toronto	4–3	Winnipeg	OT	Hildeby (5–6–4)	15,225	24–16–8	56
49	January 19	Minnesota	6–3	Toronto		Woll (11–5–3)	18,742	24–17–8	56
50	January 21	Detroit	2–1	Toronto	OT	Woll (11–5–4)	18,955	24–17–9	57
51	January 23	Vegas	6–3	Toronto		Stolarz (6–6–1)	19,305	24–18–9	57
52	January 25	Colorado	4–1	Toronto		Woll (11–6–4)	18,348	24–19–9	57
53	January 27	Buffalo	7–4	Toronto		Woll (11–7–4)	18,996	24–20–9	57
54	January 29	Toronto	2–5	Seattle		Stolarz (6–7–1)	17,151	24–21–9	57
55	January 31	Toronto	3–2	Vancouver	SO	Woll (12–7–4)	18,905	25–21–9	59

February: 2–3–0, 4 points (Home: 0–1–0; Road: 2–2–0)
#	Date	Visitor	Score	Home	OT	Decision	Attendance	Record	Pts	Recap
56	February 2	Toronto	4–2	Calgary		Woll (13–7–4)	19,289	26–21–9	61
57	February 3	Toronto	5–2	Edmonton		Stolarz (7–7–1)	18,347	27–21–9	63
58	February 25	Toronto	2–4	Tampa Bay		Stolarz (7–8–1)	19,092	27–22–9	63
59	February 26	Toronto	1–5	Florida		Woll (13–8–4)	19,372	27–23–9	63
60	February 28	Ottawa	5–2	Toronto		Woll (13–9–4)	18,952	27–24–9	63

March: 5–6–4, 14 points (Home: 2–2–2; Road: 3–4–2)
#	Date	Visitor	Score	Home	OT	Decision	Attendance	Record	Pts	Recap
61	March 2	Philadelphia	3–2	Toronto	SO	Stolarz (7–8–2)	18,255	27–24–10	64
62	March 4	Toronto	3–4	New Jersey	SO	Stolarz (7–8–3)	16,186	27–24–11	65
63	March 5	Toronto	2–6	NY Rangers		Woll (13–10–4)	17,262	27–25–11	65
64	March 7	Tampa Bay	5–2	Toronto		Stolarz (7–9–3)	18,514	27–26–11	65
65	March 10	Toronto	1–3	Montreal		Woll (13–11–4)	20,962	27–27–11	65
66	March 12	Anaheim	4–6	Toronto		Woll (14–11–4)	18,456	28–27–11	67
67	March 14	Toronto	2–3	Buffalo	SO	Woll (14–11–5)	19,070	28–27–12	68
68	March 15	Toronto	4–2	Minnesota		Stolarz (8–9–3)	17,663	29–27–12	70
69	March 17	NY Islanders	3–1	Toronto		Woll (14–12–5)	18,949	29–28–12	70
70	March 20	Carolina	4–3	Toronto	OT	Woll (14–12–6)	18,329	29–28–13	71
71	March 21	Toronto	2–5	Ottawa		Woll (14–13–6)	17,331	29–29–13	71
72	March 24	Toronto	4–2	Boston		Stolarz (9–9–3)	17,850	30–29–13	73
73	March 25	NY Rangers	3–4	Toronto		Woll (15–13–6)	18,397	31–29–13	75
74	March 28	Toronto	1–5	St. Louis		Woll (15–14–6)	18,096	31–30–13	75
75	March 30	Toronto	5–4	Anaheim	OT	Stolarz (10–9–3)	15,375	32–30–13	77

April: 0–6–1, 1 points (Home: 0–3–0; Road: 0–3–1)
#	Date	Visitor	Score	Home	OT	Decision	Attendance	Record	Pts	Recap
76	April 2	Toronto	1–4	San Jose		Stolarz (10–10–3)	15,180	32–31–13	77
77	April 4	Toronto	6–7	Los Angeles	OT	Woll (15–14–7)	18,145	32–31–14	78
78	April 8	Washington	4–0	Toronto		Woll (15–15–7)	18,640	32–32–14	78
79	April 9	Toronto	3–5	NY Islanders		Akhtyamov (0–1–0)	17,255	32–33–14	78
80	April 11	Florida	6–2	Toronto		Woll (15–16–7)	18,327	32–34–14	78
81	April 13	Dallas	6–5	Toronto		Akhtyamov (0–2–0)	18,460	32–35–14	78
82	April 15	Toronto	1–3	Ottawa		Hildeby (5–7–4)	15,919	32–36–14	78

Legend: Win (2 points) Loss (0 points) Overtime/shootout loss (1 point)

== Player statistics ==
Updated to game played April 15, 2026

=== Skaters ===
Regular season
Player	GP	G	A	Pts	+/−	PIM
William Nylander	65	30	49	79	–14	16
John Tavares	82	31	40	71	−28	28
Matthew Knies	79	23	43	66	−30	29
Auston Matthews	60	27	26	53	–4	18
Oliver Ekman-Larsson	78	8	31	39	–6	70
Matias Maccelli	71	14	25	39	−23	16
Morgan Rielly	78	11	25	36	−18	29
Max Domi	80	12	24	36	−29	95
Bobby McMann^{(X)}	60	19	13	32	−3	40
Nicholas Robertson	78	16	16	32	−13	10
Easton Cowan	66	11	18	29	–5	45
Jake McCabe	80	5	20	25	+3	64
Nicolas Roy^{(X)}	59	5	15	20	0	10
Dakota Joshua	55	10	8	18	−2	49
Steven Lorentz	71	7	11	18	–2	16
Troy Stecher	58	3	11	14	–8	12
Scott Laughton^{(X)}	43	8	4	12	−3	17
Calle Jarnkrok	56	6	2	8	−15	8
Brandon Carlo	55	0	7	7	+4	37
Simon Benoit	73	0	6	6	−22	41
Benoit-Olivier Groulx ^{(M)}	13	3	2	5	+4	0
Sammy Blais ^{(X)}	8	1	2	3	−2	4
Jacob Quillan ^{(M)}	23	1	2	3	–5	2
Christopher Tanev	11	0	2	2	+8	0
Philippe Myers	39	0	2	2	−10	22
Dakota Mermis ^{(M)}	11	1	0	1	−3	11
Luke Haymes ^{(M)}	4	0	1	1	–2	2
Matt Benning ^{(M)}	1	0	0	0	0	0
Michael Pezzetta	9	0	0	0	–2	33
Henry Thrun ^{(M)}	4	0	0	0	−1	0
Marshall Rifai	1	0	0	0	0	0
Ryan Tverberg ^{(M)}	2	0	0	0	+1	2

=== Goaltenders ===
Regular season
Player	GP	GS	TOI	W	L	OT	GA	GAA	SA	SV%	SO	G	A	PIM
Joseph Woll	39	38	2,230:04	15	16	7	124	3.34	1,220	.899	2	0	1	2
Anthony Stolarz	26	25	1,389:15	10	10	3	76	3.28	708	.893	0	0	0	2
Dennis Hildeby ^{(M)}	20	14	1,008:44	5	7	4	48	2.86	548	.914	1	0	0	0
Cayden Primeau ^{(X)}	3	3	181:28	2	1	0	13	4.30	80	.838	0	0	0	0
Artur Akhtyamov ^{(M)}	3	2	126:00	0	2	0	11	5.24	81	.877	0	0	0	0

^{(M)} Player playing for the minor league affiliate Toronto Marlies of the AHL
^{(J)} Player assigned to junior club
^{(X)} Player is no longer with the Maple Leafs organization

Bold/italics denotes franchise record.

== Transactions ==
The Maple Leafs have been involved in the following transactions during the 2025–26 season.

=== Key ===
† Contract is entry-level.
‡ Contract initially takes effect in the 2026–27 season.

=== Trades ===
Date	Details		Ref
June 30, 2025	To Utah Mammoth conditional 3rd-round pick in 2027^{1}	To Toronto Maple Leafs Matias Maccelli	
June 30, 2025	To Vegas Golden Knights Mitch Marner	To Toronto Maple Leafs Nicolas Roy	
July 10, 2025	To San Jose Sharks Ryan Reaves	To Toronto Maple Leafs Henry Thrun	
July 17, 2025	To Vancouver Canucks 4th-round pick in 2028	To Toronto Maple Leafs Dakota Joshua	
March 5, 2026	To Colorado Avalanche Nicolas Roy	To Toronto Maple Leafs conditional 5th-round pick in 2026^{2} conditional 1st-round pick in 2027^{3}	
March 6, 2026	To Seattle Kraken Bobby McMann	To Toronto Maple Leafs 4th-round pick in 2026 conditional 2nd-round pick in 2027^{4}	
March 6, 2026	To Los Angeles Kings Scott Laughton	To Toronto Maple Leafs conditional 3rd-round pick in 2026^{5}	
June 16, 2026	To Philadelphia Flyers Joseph Woll; Simon Benoit	To Toronto Maple Leafs Emil Andrae; Samuel Ersson; 3rd–round pick in 2026	
June 19, 2026	To Tampa Bay Lightning 5th-round pick in 2026	To Toronto Maple Leafs Darren Raddysh	

==== Notes ====
- 1. Utah will receive a second-round pick in 2029 if Toronto qualifies for the 2026 Stanley Cup playoffs and Maccelli records at least 51 points during the 2025–26 NHL season. Otherwise they will receive a third-round pick in 2027.
- 2. Toronto will receive the lattermost of Boston, Colorado or Philadelphia's fifth-round picks in 2026.
- 3. Toronto will receive a first-round pick in 2027 if Colorado's first is outside the top ten selections. Otherwise they will receive a first-round pick in 2028.
- 4. Toronto will receive the lower of Columbus or Winnipeg's second-round picks in 2027.
- 5. Toronto will receive Buffalo's second-round pick in 2026 if Los Angeles qualifies for the 2026 Stanley Cup playoffs. Otherwise Toronto will receive Ottawa or Washington's third-round picks in 2026 dependent on which pick Los Angeles receives from a previous trade.

=== Players acquired ===
Date	Player	Former team	Term	Via	Ref
July 1, 2025	Travis Boyd	Minnesota Wild	1-year	Free agency	
July 1, 2025	Benoit-Olivier Groulx	New York Rangers	2-year	Free agency	
July 1, 2025	Michael Pezzetta	Montreal Canadiens	2-year	Free agency	
July 2, 2025	Vinni Lettieri	Boston Bruins	1-year	Free agency	
October 6, 2025	Sammy Blais	Montreal Canadiens	1-year	Waivers	
October 6, 2025	Cayden Primeau	Carolina Hurricanes	1-year	Waivers	
November 15, 2025	Troy Stecher	Edmonton Oilers	1-year	Waivers	
March 17, 2026	Vincent Borgesi	Northeastern University (Hockey East)	2-year†‡	Free agency	
March 18, 2026	Brandon Buhr	Union College (ECAC Hockey)	1-year†‡	Free agency	
March 27, 2026	Hayes Hundley	St. Thomas University (CCHA)	3-year†‡	Free agency	
April 14, 2026	Landon Sim	Toronto Marlies (AHL)	2-year†‡	Free agency	

=== Players lost ===
Date	Player	New team	Term	Via	Ref
July 1, 2025	Nick Abruzzese	Tampa Bay Lightning	1-year	Free agency	
July 1, 2025	Pontus Holmberg	Tampa Bay Lightning	2-year	Free agency	
July 1, 2025	Matt Murray	Seattle Kraken	1-year	Free agency	
July 1, 2025	Alex Steeves	Boston Bruins	1-year	Free agency	
July 7, 2025	Reese Johnson	Toronto Marlies (AHL)	1-year	Free agency	
July 11, 2025	Cedric Pare	Toronto Marlies (AHL)	1-year	Free agency	
July 16, 2025	Ty Voit			Contract termination	
August 4, 2025	Alexander Nylander	Toronto Marlies (AHL)	1-year	Free agency	
September 30, 2025	Max Pacioretty			Retirement	
November 7, 2025	Cayden Primeau	Carolina Hurricanes	1-year	Waivers	
November 14, 2025	David Kampf			Contract termination	
November 27, 2025	Sammy Blais	Montreal Canadiens	1-year	Waivers	

=== Signings ===
Date	Player	Term	Ref
June 27, 2025	John Tavares	4-year	
June 29, 2025	Matthew Knies	6-year	
June 30, 2025	Steven Lorentz	3-year	
June 30, 2025	Mitch Marner	8-year	
July 1, 2025	Dakota Mermis	2-year	
July 15, 2025	Miroslav Holinka	3-year†	
August 2, 2025	Nicholas Robertson	1-year	
August 5, 2025	William Villeneuve	1-year	
September 2, 2025	Dennis Hildeby	3-year	
September 28, 2025	Anthony Stolarz	4-year‡	
March 15, 2026	Artur Akhtyamov	3-year‡	
March 27, 2026	Hayes Hundley	3-year†‡	
June 15, 2026	Tinus Luc Koblar	3-year†‡	
June 19, 2026	Darren Raddysh	8-year‡	

== Draft picks ==
Below are the Toronto Maple Leafs' selections at the 2025 NHL entry draft, which was held on June 27 to 28, 2025, at Peacock Theater in Los Angeles.

Round	#	Player	Pos.	Nationality	Team (League)
2	64	Tinus Luc Koblar	C	Norway	Leksands IF J20 (J20 Nationell)
3	86	Tyler Hopkins	C	Canada	Kingston Frontenacs (OHL)
5	137	William Belle	RW	United States	USNTDP (USHL)
5	153	Harry Nansi	C	Canada	Owen Sound Attack (OHL)
6	185	Ryan Fellinger	D	Canada	Flint Firebirds (OHL)
7	217	Matthew Hlacar	LW	Canada	Kitchener Rangers (OHL)
