= 2025–26 New Jersey Devils season =

National Hockey League season

2025–26 New Jersey Devils
- Division: 7th Metropolitan
- Conference: 13th Eastern
- 2025–26 record: 42–37–3
- Home record: 21–17–3
- Road record: 21–20–0
- Goals for: 230
- Goals against: 254

Team information
- General manager: Tom Fitzgerald (Oct. 9 – Apr. 6); Vacant (Apr. 6 – Apr. 14)
- Coach: Sheldon Keefe
- Captain: Nico Hischier
- Alternate captains: Jesper Bratt (Jan. 27 – Apr. 14); Jack Hughes; Ondrej Palat (Oct. 9 – Jan. 27)
- Arena: Prudential Center
- Minor league affiliates: Utica Comets (AHL); Adirondack Thunder (ECHL)

Team leaders
- Goals: Nico Hischier (28)
- Assists: Jesper Bratt (50)
- Points: Jack Hughes (77)
- Penalty minutes: Brenden Dillon (89)
- Plus/minus: Cody Glass (+3)
- Wins: Jacob Markstrom (23)
- Goals against average: Nico Daws (2.62)

The 2025–26 New Jersey Devils season was the 52nd season for the National Hockey League (NHL) franchise that was established on June 11, 1974, and 44th season since the franchise relocated from Colorado prior to the 1982–83 NHL season.

On April 6, 2026, the Devils fired general manager Tom Fitzgerald. The following day, on April 7, the Devils were eliminated from playoff contention following a 5–1 loss to the Philadelphia Flyers.

== Standings ==
=== Divisional standings ===
Metropolitan Division
Pos	Team	GP	W	L	OTL	RW	GF	GA	GD	Pts
1	z – Carolina Hurricanes	82	53	22	7	39	296	240	+56	113
2	x – Pittsburgh Penguins	82	41	25	16	34	293	268	+25	98
3	x – Philadelphia Flyers	82	43	27	12	27	250	243	+7	98
4	Washington Capitals	82	43	30	9	37	263	244	+19	95
5	Columbus Blue Jackets	82	40	30	12	28	253	253	0	92
6	New York Islanders	82	43	34	5	29	233	241	−8	91
7	New Jersey Devils	82	42	37	3	29	230	254	−24	87
8	New York Rangers	82	34	39	9	25	238	250	−12	77

Source: National Hockey League
Rules for classification: 1) Fewer number of games played (GP, only during regular season); 2) Greater number of regulation wins (RW); 3) Greater number of wins in regulation and overtime, excluding shootout wins (ROW); 4) Greater number of total wins, including shootouts (W); 5) Greater number of points earned in head-to-head play; if teams played an uneven number of head-to-head games, the result of the first game on the home ice of the team with the extra home game is discarded; 6) Greater goal differential (GD); 7) Greater number of goals scored (GF)
x – Clinched playoff spot; z – Clinched conference

=== Conference standings ===
Eastern Conference Wild Card
Pos	Div	Team	GP	W	L	OTL	RW	GF	GA	GD	Pts
1	AT	x – Boston Bruins	82	45	27	10	33	272	250	+22	100
2	AT	x – Ottawa Senators	82	44	27	11	38	278	246	+32	99
3	ME	Washington Capitals	82	43	30	9	37	263	244	+19	95
4	AT	Detroit Red Wings	82	41	31	10	30	241	258	−17	92
5	ME	Columbus Blue Jackets	82	40	30	12	28	253	253	0	92
6	ME	New York Islanders	82	43	34	5	29	233	241	−8	91
7	ME	New Jersey Devils	82	42	37	3	29	230	254	−24	87
8	AT	Florida Panthers	82	40	38	4	32	251	276	−25	84
9	AT	Toronto Maple Leafs	82	32	36	14	23	253	299	−46	78
10	ME	New York Rangers	82	34	39	9	25	238	250	−12	77

Source: National Hockey League
Rules for classification: 1) Fewer number of games played (GP, only during regular season); 2) Greater number of regulation wins (RW); 3) Greater number of wins in regulation and overtime, excluding shootout wins (ROW); 4) Greater number of total wins, including shootouts (W); 5) Greater number of points earned in head-to-head play; if teams played an uneven number of head-to-head games, the result of the first game on the home ice of the team with the extra home game is discarded; 6) Greater goal differential (GD); 7) Greater number of goals scored (GF)
x – Clinched playoff spot

== Schedule and results ==
=== Preseason ===
The preseason schedule was published on June 24, 2025.

2025 preseason game log: 3–2–2 (home: 1–1–1; road: 2–1–1)
#	Date	Visitor	Score	Home	OT	Decision	Attendance	Record	Recap
1	September 21	NY Rangers	5–3	New Jersey		Daws	13,309	0–1–0
2	September 23	NY Islanders	2–6	New Jersey		Romanov	8,076	1–1–0
3	September 26	New Jersey	4–2	NY Islanders		Malek	10,130	2–1–0
4^{A} ^{B}	September 28	New Jersey	0–2	Ottawa		Romanov	12,159	2–2–0
5^{A}	September 28	Washington	3–2	New Jersey	SO	Daws	8,341	2–2–1
6	October 2	New Jersey	3–1	NY Rangers		Markstrom	17,049	3–2–1
7	October 4	New Jersey	3–4	Philadelphia	SO	Allen	14,795	3–2–2
Notes:^{A} Indicates split-squad. ^{B} Game played at the Videotron Centre in Quebec City, Quebec.

=== Regular season ===
The regular season schedule was released on July 16, 2025.

2025–26 game log

October: 8–3–0 (home: 5–0–0; road: 3–3–0)
#	Date	Visitor	Score	Home	OT	Decision	Attendance	Record	Pts	Recap
1	October 9	New Jersey	3–6	Carolina		Markstrom	18,404	0–1–0	0
2	October 11	New Jersey	5–3	Tampa Bay		Markstrom	19,092	1–1–0	2
3	October 13	New Jersey	3–2	Columbus		Markstrom	18,627	2–1–0	4
4	October 16	Florida	1–3	New Jersey		Allen	16,514	3–1–0	6
5	October 18	Edmonton	3–5	New Jersey		Allen	16,514	4–1–0	8
6	October 21	New Jersey	5–2	Toronto		Allen	18,306	5–1–0	10
7	October 22	Minnesota	1–4	New Jersey		Daws	16,434	6–1–0	12
8	October 24	San Jose	1–3	New Jersey		Allen	16,514	7–1–0	14
9	October 26	Colorado	3–4	New Jersey	OT	Allen	16,514	8–1–0	16
10	October 28	New Jersey	4–8	Colorado		Markstrom	18,095	8–2–0	16
11	October 30	New Jersey	2–5	San Jose		Allen	12,930	8–3–0	16

November: 8–5–1 (home: 4–1–1; road: 4–4–0)
#	Date	Visitor	Score	Home	OT	Decision	Attendance	Record	Pts	Recap
12	November 1	New Jersey	4–1	Los Angeles		Markstrom	16,110	9–3–0	18
13	November 2	New Jersey	1–4	Anaheim		Allen	17,174	9–4–0	18
14	November 6	Montreal	3–4	New Jersey	OT	Markstrom	16,514	10–4–0	20
15	November 8	Pittsburgh	1–2	New Jersey	SO	Allen	16,514	11–4–0	22
16	November 10	NY Islanders	3–2	New Jersey	OT	Markstrom	16,514	11–4–1	23
17	November 12	New Jersey	4–3	Chicago	OT	Markstrom	17,268	12–4–1	25
18	November 15	New Jersey	3–2	Washington	SO	Allen	18,347	13–4–1	27
19	November 18	New Jersey	1–5	Tampa Bay		Markstrom	19,092	13–5–1	27
20	November 20	New Jersey	0–1	Florida		Allen	19,473	13–6–1	27
21	November 22	New Jersey	3–6	Philadelphia		Allen	18,342	13–7–1	27
22	November 24	Detroit	3–4	New Jersey		Markstrom	16,514	14–7–1	29
23	November 26	St. Louis	2–3	New Jersey	OT	Markstrom	16,056	15–7–1	31
24	November 28	New Jersey	5–0	Buffalo		Allen	19,070	16–7–1	33
25	November 29	Philadelphia	5–3	New Jersey		Markstrom	16,757	16–8–1	33

December: 5–9–1 (home: 1–6–1; road: 4–3–0)
#	Date	Visitor	Score	Home	OT	Decision	Attendance	Record	Pts	Recap
26	December 1	Columbus	5–3	New Jersey		Allen	13,381	16–9–1	33
27	December 3	Dallas	3–0	New Jersey		Markstrom	15,805	16–10–1	33
28	December 5	Vegas	3–0	New Jersey		Markstrom	15,842	16–11–1	33
29	December 6	New Jersey	1–4	Boston		Allen	17,850	16–12–1	33
30	December 9	New Jersey	4–3	Ottawa		Markstrom	16,159	17–12–1	35
31	December 11	Tampa Bay	8–4	New Jersey		Allen	16,042	17–13–1	35
32	December 13	Anaheim	1–4	New Jersey		Allen	15,755	18–13–1	37
33	December 14	Vancouver	2–1	New Jersey		Markstrom	13,821	18–14–1	37
34	December 17	New Jersey	2–1	Vegas	SO	Allen	17,862	19–14–1	39
35	December 19	New Jersey	2–1	Utah		Markstrom	12,478	20–14–1	41
36	December 21	Buffalo	3–1	New Jersey		Allen	16,886	20–15–1	41
37	December 23	New Jersey	1–2	NY Islanders		Markstrom	17,255	20–16–1	41
38	December 27	Washington	4–3	New Jersey	OT	Allen	16,763	20–16–2	42
39	December 30	New Jersey	0–4	Toronto		Markstrom	18,923	20–17–2	42
40	December 31	New Jersey	3–2	Columbus		Allen	17,163	21–17–2	44

January: 7–8–0 (home: 3–3–0; road: 4–5–0)
#	Date	Visitor	Score	Home	OT	Decision	Attendance	Record	Pts	Recap
41	January 3	Utah	1–4	New Jersey		Markstrom	16,928	22–17–2	46
42	January 4	Carolina	3–1	New Jersey		Allen	16,092	22–18–2	46
43	January 6	New Jersey	0–9	NY Islanders		Markstrom	17,255	22–19–2	46
44	January 8	New Jersey	1–4	Pittsburgh		Allen	16,125	22–20–2	46
45	January 11	New Jersey	3–4	Winnipeg		Allen	14,165	22–21–2	46
46	January 12	New Jersey	5–2	Minnesota		Markstrom	18,747	23–21–2	48
47	January 14	Seattle	2–3	New Jersey	OT	Markstrom	16,027	24–21–2	50
48	January 17	Carolina	4–1	New Jersey		Markstrom	16,514	24–22–2	50
49	January 19	New Jersey	2–1	Calgary	OT	Markstrom	16,435	25–22–2	52
50	January 20	New Jersey	2–1	Edmonton		Allen	18,347	26–22–2	54
51	January 23	New Jersey	5–4	Vancouver		Markstrom	18,603	27–22–2	56
52	January 25	New Jersey	2–4	Seattle		Markstrom	17,151	27–23–2	56
53	January 27	Winnipeg	4–3	New Jersey		Allen	14,454	27–24–2	56
54	January 29	Nashville	2–3	New Jersey	OT	Markstrom	15,788	28–24–2	58
55	January 31	New Jersey	1–4	Ottawa		Allen	18,319	28–25–2	58

February: 1–4–0 (home: 0–3–0; road: 1–1–0)
#	Date	Visitor	Score	Home	OT	Decision	Attendance	Record	Pts	Recap
56	February 3	Columbus	3–0	New Jersey		Markstrom	15,551	28–26–2	58
57	February 5	NY Islanders	3–1	New Jersey		Allen	16,514	28–27–2	58
58	February 25	Buffalo	2–1	New Jersey		Allen	16,514	28–28–2	58
59	February 26	New Jersey	1–4	Pittsburgh		Markstrom	18,288	28–29–2	58
60	February 28	New Jersey	3–1	St. Louis		Markstrom	18,096	29–29–2	60

March: 9–5–0 (home: 6–2–0; road: 3–3–0)
#	Date	Visitor	Score	Home	OT	Decision	Attendance	Record	Pts	Recap
61	March 3	Florida	1–5	New Jersey		Markstrom	15,080	30–29–2	62
62	March 4	Toronto	3–4	New Jersey	SO	Markstrom	16,186	31–29–2	64
63	March 7	NY Rangers	3–6	New Jersey		Markstrom	16,514	32–29–2	66
64	March 8	Detroit	3–0	New Jersey		Markstrom	16,514	32–30–2	66
65	March 12	Calgary	5–4	New Jersey		Markstrom	15,388	32–31–2	66
66	March 14	Los Angeles	4–6	New Jersey		Allen	16,072	33–31–2	68
67	March 16	Boston	3–4	New Jersey	OT	Markstrom	16,034	34–31–2	70
68	March 18	New Jersey	6–3	NY Rangers		Markstrom	17,307	35–31–2	72
69	March 20	New Jersey	1–2	Washington		Allen	18,347	35–32–2	72
70	March 24	New Jersey	6–4	Dallas		Allen	18,532	36–32–2	74
71	March 26	New Jersey	4–2	Nashville		Markstrom	17,159	37–32–2	76
72	March 28	New Jersey	2–5	Carolina		Markstrom	18,579	37–33–2	76
73	March 29	Chicago	3–5	New Jersey		Allen	16,514	38–33–2	78
74	March 31	New Jersey	1–4	NY Rangers		Markstrom	17,422	38–34–2	78

April: 4–3–1 (home: 2–2–1; road: 2–1–0)
#	Date	Visitor	Score	Home	OT	Decision	Attendance	Record	Pts	Recap
75	April 2	Washington	3–7	New Jersey		Allen	16,057	39–34–2	80
76	April 4	Montreal	4–3	New Jersey	SO	Allen	16,514	39–34–3	81
77	April 5	New Jersey	3–0	Montreal		Markstrom	20,962	40–34–3	83
78	April 7	Philadelphia	5–1	New Jersey		Markstrom	16,514	40–35–3	83
79	April 9	Pittsburgh	5–2	New Jersey		Allen	16,514	40–36–3	83
80	April 11	New Jersey	5–3	Detroit		Allen	19,515	41–36–3	85
81	April 12	Ottawa	3–4	New Jersey	OT	Daws	16,514	42–36–3	87
82	April 14	New Jersey	0–4	Boston		Daws	17,850	42–37–3	87

Legend: Win (2 points) Loss (0 points) Overtime/shootout loss (1 point)

== Player statistics ==
=== Skaters ===
Regular season
Player	GP	G	A	Pts	+/−	PIM
Jack Hughes	61	27	50	77	0	10
Jesper Bratt	82	22	49	71	–11	12
Nico Hischier	82	28	38	66	–6	29
Timo Meier	77	24	20	44	–16	22
Connor Brown	75	18	25	43	–1	22
Dawson Mercer	82	20	22	42	–2	33
Dougie Hamilton	77	12	27	39	–2	50
Luke Hughes	68	6	29	35	–4	32
Arseny Gritsyuk	66	13	18	31	–3	26
Cody Glass	70	19	7	26	3	39
Simon Nemec	68	11	15	26	–11	26
Jonas Siegenthaler	82	0	16	16	–9	48
Paul Cotter	79	9	6	15	–24	19
Brenden Dillon	82	3	12	15	–13	89
Ondrej Palat^{‡}	51	4	6	10	–5	12
Lenni Hameenaho	33	2	6	8	–3	14
Johnathan Kovacevic	34	0	8	8	0	38
Stefan Noesen	38	3	4	7	–12	33
Brett Pesce	37	1	6	7	–11	6
Luke Glendening^{‡}	52	0	4	4	2	2
Colton White	23	0	4	4	2	2
Brian Halonen	15	1	1	2	–1	9
Maxim Tsyplakov^{†}	22	1	1	2	–8	0
Nick Bjugstad^{†}	26	0	2	2	–4	8
Juho Lammikko	24	0	2	2	–4	4
Dennis Cholowski	17	0	2	2	–6	2
Angus Crookshank	8	1	0	1	1	4
Evgenii Dadonov	24	1	0	1	–6	2
Angus Crookshank	8	1	0	1	1	4
Zack MacEwen	3	0	0	0	0	0
Nathan Légaré	1	0	0	0	0	0
Topias Vilen	2	0	0	0	1	0
Shane Lachance	1	0	0	0	0	0
Marc McLaughlin	7	0	0	0	–2	0
Seamus Casey	2	0	0	0	–3	0
Xavier Parent	5	0	0	0	–1	2

=== Goaltenders ===
Regular season
Player	GP	GS	TOI	W	L	OT	GA	GAA	SA	SV%	SO	G	A	PIM
Jacob Markstrom	44	43	2544:01	23	19	1	130	3.07	1113	.883	1	0	4	13
Jake Allen	37	36	2186:34	17	17	2	100	2.74	1031	.904	1	0	1	0
Nico Daws	3	3	183:16	2	1	0	8	2.62	87	.908	0	0	0	0

^{†} Denotes player spent time with another team before joining the Devils. Stats reflect time with the Devils only.

- ^{‡} Denotes player was traded mid-season. Stats reflect time with the Devils only.
- Bold/italics denotes franchise record.

== Transactions ==
The Devils have been involved in the following transactions during the 2025–26 season.

=== Trades ===
Date	Details		Ref
July 2, 2025	To San Jose Sharks Shane Bowers	To New Jersey Devils Thomas Bordeleau	
October 3, 2025	To Ottawa Senators Kurtis MacDermid	To New Jersey Devils Zack MacEwen	
January 27, 2026	To New York Islanders Ondrej Palat; 3rd-round pick in 2026 6th-round pick in 2027	To New Jersey Devils Maxim Tsyplakov	
February 4, 2026	To St. Louis Blues Thomas Bordeleau conditional DAL 4th-round pick in 2026 or NJD 4th-round pick in 2026 or WPG 4th-round pick in 2026	To New Jersey Devils Nick Bjugstad	
June 23, 2026	To Calgary Flames Simon Nemec; Maxim Tsyplakov	To New Jersey Devils Etienne Morin conditional (Note: New Jersey will receive Vegas' first-round pick in 2027 if the pick is outside of the top ten selections. Otherwise, New Jersey will receive a first-round pick in 2028.) VGK 1st-round pick in 2027 or VGK 1st-round pick in 2028 conditional (Note: New Jersey will receive Colorado's first-round pick in 2028 if the pick is outside of the top ten selections and has not already been conveyed to the Toronto Maple Leafs. Otherwise, New Jersey will receive a first-round pick in 2029.) COL 1st-round pick in 2028 or COL 1st-round pick in 2029; NYR 2nd-round pick in 2026	

=== Free agents ===
Date	Player	Team	Contract term	Ref
July 1, 2025	Calen Addison	from Springfield Thunderbirds (AHL)	1-year	
July 1, 2025	Connor Brown	from Edmonton Oilers	4-year	
July 1, 2025	Angus Crookshank	from Ottawa Senators	2-year	
July 1, 2025	Evgenii Dadonov	from Dallas Stars	2-year	
July 1, 2025	Justin Dowling	to New York Rangers	2-year	
July 1, 2025	Brian Dumoulin	to Los Angeles Kings	3-year	
July 1, 2025	Nolan Foote	to Florida Panthers	1-year	
July 1, 2025	Samuel Laberge	to San Jose Sharks	1-year	
July 1, 2025	Juho Lammikko	from ZSC Lions (NL)	1-year	
July 2, 2025	Curtis Lazar	to Edmonton Oilers	1-year	
July 2, 2025	Isaac Poulter	to Winnipeg Jets	1-year	
July 23, 2025	Daniel Sprong	to HC CSKA Moscow (KHL)	1-year	
August 9, 2025	Nathan Bastian	to Dallas Stars	1-year	
October 7, 2025	Luke Glendening	from Tampa Bay Lightning	1-year	

=== Waivers ===
Date	Player	Team	Ref
March 6, 2026	Luke Glendening	Placed on waivers by New Jersey Devils	

=== Signings ===
Date	Player	Contract term	Ref
July 1, 2025	Marc McLaughlin	1-year	
July 1, 2025	Dennis Cholowski	1-year	
July 1, 2025	Jake Allen	5-year	
July 2, 2025	Cody Glass	2-year	
October 1, 2025	Luke Hughes	7-year	

== Draft picks ==
Below are the New Jersey Devils selections at the 2025 NHL entry draft, which was held on June 27 and 28, 2025, at the Peacock Theater in Los Angeles, California.

Round	#	Player	Pos	Nationality	College/Junior/Club team (League)
2	50	Conrad Fondrk	C	United States	U.S. NTDP (USHL)
2	63	Ben Kevan	RW	United States	Des Moines Buccaneers (USHL)
3	90	Mason Moe	C	United States	Madison Capitols (USHL)
4	99	Trenten Bennett	C	Canada	Kemptville 73's (CCHL)
4	114	Gustav Hillstrom	C	Sweden	Brynäs IF (SHL)
6	161	David Rozsival	RW	Czechia	Bili Tygri Liberec U20 (Czechia U20)
6	178	Sigge Holmgren	D	Sweden	Brynäs IF J20 (J20 Nationell)
