= Phillip Danault =

Canadian ice hockey player (born 1993)

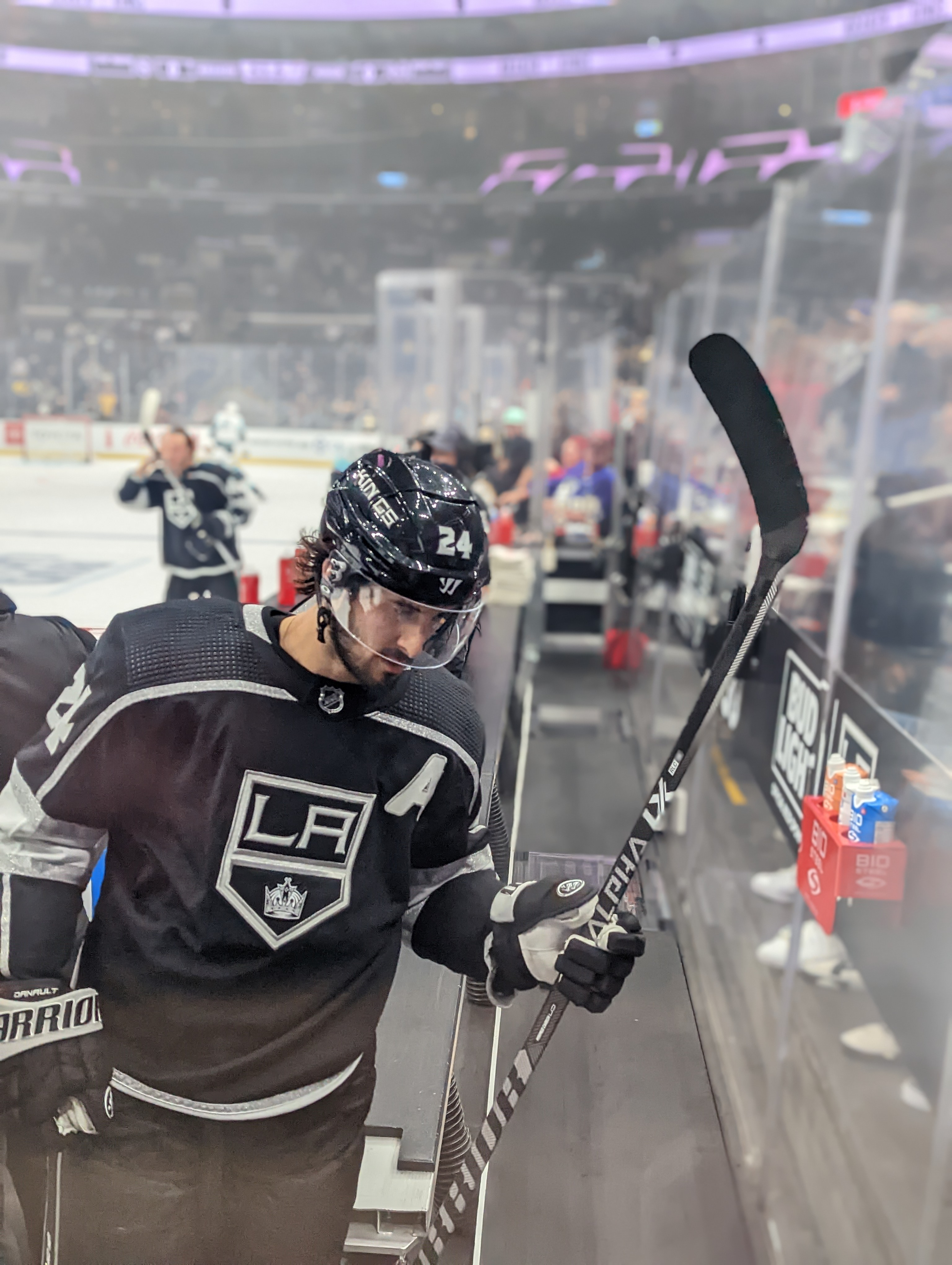
- Danault with the Los Angeles Kings in 2023
- Born: February 24, 1993 (age 33) Victoriaville, Quebec, Canada
- Height: 6 ft 1 in (185 cm)
- Weight: 200 lb (91 kg; 14 st 4 lb)
- Position: Forward
- Shoots: Left
- NHL team Former teams: Montreal Canadiens; Chicago Blackhawks; Los Angeles Kings
- National team: Canada
- NHL draft: 26th overall, 2011; Chicago Blackhawks
- Playing career: 2012–present

Phillip Danault (born February 24, 1993) is a Canadian professional ice hockey player who is a forward for the Montreal Canadiens of the National Hockey League (NHL). He was selected in the first round, 26th overall, by the Chicago Blackhawks of the 2011 NHL entry draft. Danault has also previously played for the Los Angeles Kings.

== Early life ==
Danault was born on February 24, 1993, in Victoriaville, Quebec, to parents Alain and Michelle. His mother works as a nurse while his father previously served as the public address announcer for the Victoriaville Tigres of the Quebec Major Junior Hockey League (QMJHL).

== Playing career ==
=== Amateur ===
Danault played minor hockey with Hockey Bois-Francs and was named captain for his team across various age groups.

Joining the Trois-Rivières Estacades of the Ligue de hockey Midget AAA du Québec (QMAAA) for the 2008–09 season, Danault provided offensive prowess to help his team reach the final of that year's Jimmy-Ferrari Cup. Thereafter, he was selected ninth overall by his hometown Victoriaville Tigres in the annual Quebec Major Junior Hockey League (QMJHL) draft.

Establishing new career-highs for production during the 2010–11 QMJHL season, Danault was recognized for his efforts with a number of league accolades. He was named Player of the Game during the 2010 Subway Super Series against the Russian juniors and was selected to represent Team Cherry at the 2011 CHL/NHL Top Prospects Game In January 2011, Danault ranked 23rd amongst North American skaters for the upcoming NHL entry draft as determined by the league's Central Scouting Bureau. He was also appointed captain of the Tigres following the departure of predecessor Philip-Michael Devos. Capturing the Guy Carbonneau Trophy as the QMJHL's best defensive forward, he was selected in the first round of the 2011 NHL entry draft (26th overall) by the Chicago Blackhawks.

After participating in the Blackhawks' training camp in September 2011, Danault rejoined the QMJHL ranks for the 2011–12 season. Recording 18 points through his first 19 games, he was selected to represent Team QMJHL in the 2011 Subway Super Series. Danault ultimately finished the season setting new career-highs with 53 assists and 71 points through 62 contests. Upon elimination from the President's Cup playoffs, Danault joined the Blackhawks' American Hockey League (AHL) affiliate, the Rockford IceHogs in March 2012. Collectively, he tallied two assists and ten penalty minutes over his seven-game stint with the IceHogs.

Midway through the ensuing 2012–13 season, Danault was traded to the Moncton Wildcats in exchange for forward Gabriel Gagné and various draft picks. Upon joining the team, he was immediately placed on their top line with Dmitrij Jaškin and Ivan Barbashev. In their first eight games together, the trio combined for 22 goals. After the Wildcats were eliminated from the 2013 postseason, Danault was again reassigned to Rockford for the remainder of the AHL season.

=== Professional ===
==== Chicago Blackhawks (2012–2016) ====
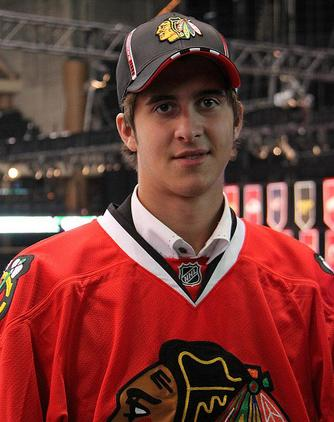
Danault after being selected by the Chicago Blackhawks during the 2011 NHL entry draft.

Attending training camp with the Blackhawks in September 2013, Danault was reassigned to the AHL for the 2013–14 season. While often playing lower in the IceHogs' lineup, he recorded six goals and 20 assists over the course of his first full professional campaign.

Following a strong performance in the Blackhawks' 2014 Rookie Tournament held in London, Ontario, where he scored three goals over his first two games, Danault earned a spot in preseason action, centering a line which included Dennis Rasmussen and Ryan Hartman before rejoining Rockford to begin the 2014–15 season. However, as a result of numerous injuries to the Chicago lineup, Danault was recalled by the team on November 21, and he made his NHL debut the following night against the Edmonton Oilers. At the time of his recall, Danault had recorded three goals and seven assists in 14 games with the IceHogs. He played in one more game following his debut before being returned to the AHL on November 24. Danault finished the regular season with 13 goals and 25 assists for 38 points through 70 games despite later revelation that he had played most of this time with a torn labrum.

Initially expected to miss four months to recover from offseason surgery in August 2015, Danault returned to the IceHogs lineup quicker than anticipated. After appearing in six games with the IceHogs by mid-December, he was recalled to the NHL level, and registered his first NHL point with an assist on a goal scored by teammate Andrew Shaw in a 4–3 win against the San Jose Sharks on December 20. A few weeks later, he scored his first career NHL goal on January 8, 2016, in a 3–1 win over the Buffalo Sabres.

==== Montreal Canadiens (2016–2021) ====
Tallying five points through 30 games to begin the 2015–16 season with the Blackhawks, Danault was traded to the Montreal Canadiens, along with Chicago's second-round pick in the 2018 NHL entry draft, in exchange for forwards Dale Weise and Tomáš Fleischmann on February 26, 2016. He appeared in an additional 21 games with the Canadiens and recorded three goals and two assists over that span. That July, Danault was signed to a two-year contract extension by the team.

On January 13, 2018, during a game against the Boston Bruins, Danault was hit in the head by a shot from defenceman Zdeno Chára and remained motionless on the ice for several minutes. Although stretchered off the ice and transported to hospital, Danault was only kept overnight for observation and was subsequently released to rest at home. Danault later agreed to a three-year contract extension with the Canadiens carrying an average annual value of $3.08 million.

Concluding the 2018–19 season with a career-high 53 points, including his first career NHL hat-trick in a 4–3 overtime win over the Vegas Golden Knights on December 20, Danault placed seventh in votes for Frank J. Selke Trophy consideration, awarded to the best defensive forward league wide.

In advance of the 2020–21 season, the final year of his contract, Danault and team general manager Marc Bergevin were unable to reach terms on a new extension, reportedly due to disagreements over the former's future role on the team with younger centres such as Nick Suzuki and Jesperi Kotkaniemi progressing in the organization. During the ensuing pandemic-shortened regular season, Danault posted five goals and 24 points across 53 games, and once again finished top-10 in Selke Trophy voting. He then distinguished himself during his team's unexpected run to the 2021 Stanley Cup Final, their first championship series appearance since 1993, where they were ultimately defeated by the Tampa Bay Lightning in five games. Danault was credited with a strong defensive performance against opposing top forwards during the postseason.

==== Los Angeles Kings (2021–2025) ====
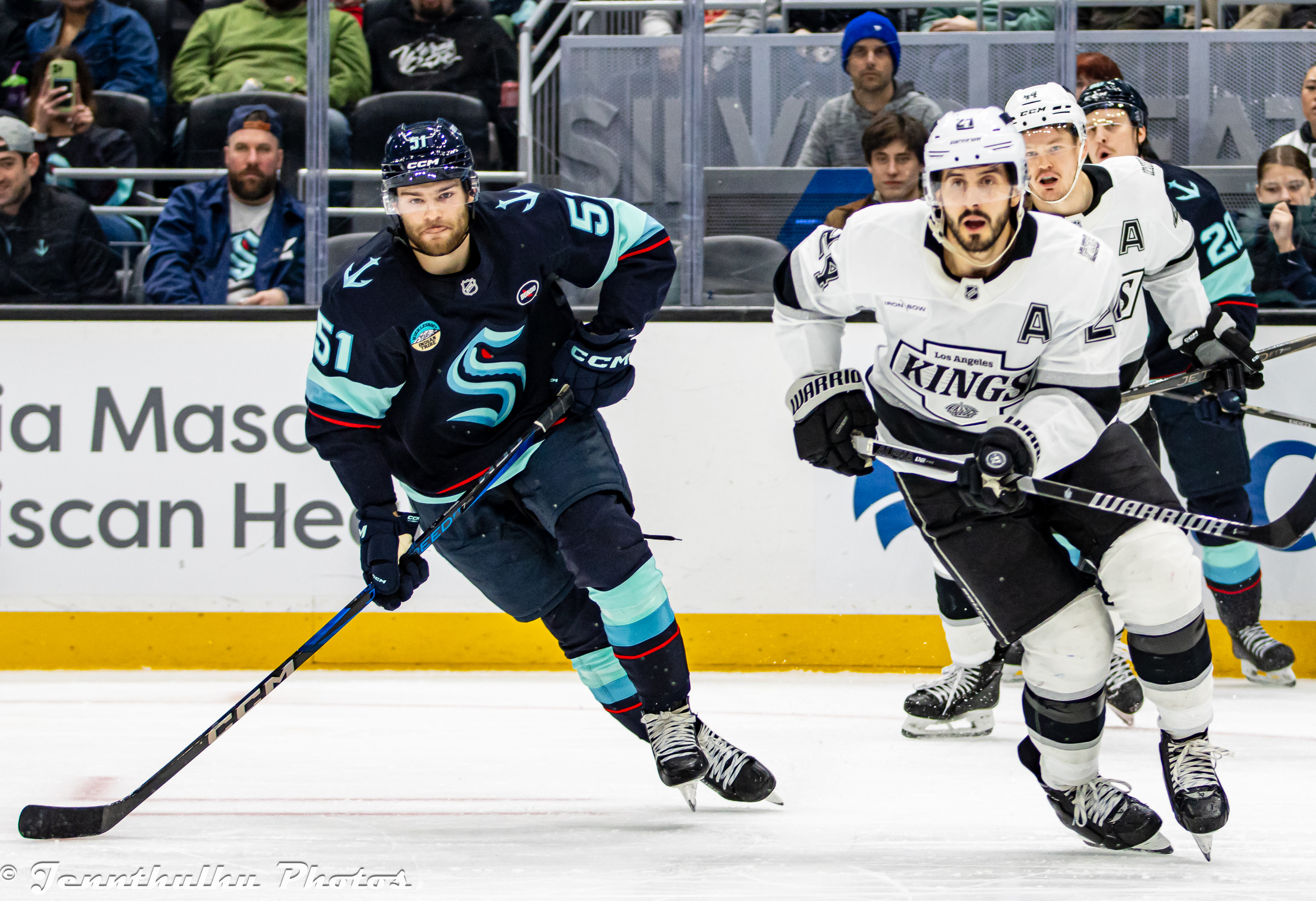
Danault with the Kings in the 2024–25 season.

After becoming an unrestricted free agent, Danault signed a six-year, $33 million contract with the Los Angeles Kings on July 28, 2021. He finished the 2021–22 season with a career-high 27 goals, en route to helping them clinch a playoff spot for the first time since 2018. Facing off against the Edmonton Oilers in the first round of the 2022 Stanley Cup playoffs, Danault scored the tiebreaking goal late in the third period of the series opener to lead the Kings to a 4–3 win. Although subject to a head-butt by Oilers defenceman Darnell Nurse in the penultimate matchup, Danault staved off injury and helped push the Oilers to a winner-take-all game 7. Despite this, the Kings were shutout by the Oilers in the decisive game and failed to advance. For his part, Danault finished the opening series with three goals and two assists through seven games, and was recognized with numerous team, fan and local media honours.

On March 9, 2023, Danault scored his 99th and 100th NHL goals in a 5–2 win over the Colorado Avalanche. At the conclusion of the regular season, Danault received the Daryl Evans Youth Hockey Service Award for his role in the Kings' Learn-to-Play programming.

On March 3, 2024, Danault recorded his second career hat-trick in a 5–1 win against the New Jersey Devils.

The 2025–26 season brought offensive struggles for Danault, who failed to score a goal in his first 30 games with the Kings, and only managed five assists in the same span. By early December 2025, reports circulated that he had requested a trade, and that this might occur prior to the league's trade freeze over the Christmas holidays.

==== Return to Montreal (2025–present) ====
On December 19, 2025, the Kings dealt Danault to the Canadiens in exchange for a 2026 second-round pick. Early into his second tenure with the team, he recorded a multi-assist effort in a victory over the Dallas Stars on January 4, including the 400th point of his NHL career. Danault finally scored his first goal of the season on January 20, helping the Canadiens to their first win against the Minnesota Wild since 2019. He finished the regular season with six goals and six assists in 45 games with the Canadiens, used primarily as a bottom six defensive forward. He continued in this role as the Canadiens progressed in the 2026 Stanley Cup playoffs, and scored his first goal of the postseason on May 18 in a series-clinching 3–2 win in Game 7 of the second round against the Buffalo Sabres. Danault had two goals and eight assists in 19 playoff games, as the Canadiens reached the Eastern Conference Final before falling to the Carolina Hurricanes.

Early in the 2026–27 season, Danault appeared in his 800th career NHL game on October 31.

== International play ==
Medal record

Representing Canada

Men's ice hockey

Ivan Hlinka Memorial Cup
Gold medal – first place	2010 Slovakia/Czech Republic	

Internationally, Danault first represented Hockey Canada as part of team Canada Quebec at the 2010 World U-17 Hockey Challenge where his team ultimately finished in sixth place. Thereafter, he was named to the national under-18 team for that year's Ivan Hlinka Memorial Cup, winning a gold medal.

In December 2011, Danault was invited to the annual selection camp for the Canadian national junior team, but failed to make the roster after being amongst the final cuts. The following year, Danault made the team for the 2013 World Junior Championships.

In May 2025, Danault was added to his country's national senior team for the 2025 IIHF World Championship.

== Personal life ==
Danault married his longtime girlfriend, fellow Québécois Marie-Pierre Fortin, in their home province during the 2018 offseason. The couple has two children: a son and a daughter.

== Career statistics ==
=== Regular season and playoffs ===
			Regular season					Playoffs
Season	Team	League	GP	G	A	Pts	PIM	GP	G	A	Pts	PIM
2008–09	Trois-Rivières Estacades	QMAAA	44	8	19	27	32	19	4	11	15	8
2009–10	Victoriaville Tigres	QMJHL	61	10	18	28	54	16	0	1	1	8
2010–11	Victoriaville Tigres	QMJHL	64	23	44	67	59	9	5	10	15	6
2011–12	Victoriaville Tigres	QMJHL	62	18	53	71	61	4	0	3	3	4
2011–12	Rockford IceHogs	AHL	7	0	2	2	10	—	—	—	—	—
2012–13	Victoriaville Tigres	QMJHL	29	14	30	44	28	—	—	—	—	—
2012–13	Moncton Wildcats	QMJHL	27	9	32	41	22	4	1	3	4	0
2012–13	Rockford IceHogs	AHL	5	0	0	0	2	—	—	—	—	—
2013–14	Rockford IceHogs	AHL	72	6	20	26	40	—	—	—	—	—
2014–15	Rockford IceHogs	AHL	70	13	25	38	38	8	3	2	5	20
2014–15	Chicago Blackhawks	NHL	2	0	0	0	0	—	—	—	—	—
2015–16	Rockford IceHogs	AHL	6	1	1	2	4	—	—	—	—	—
2015–16	Chicago Blackhawks	NHL	30	1	4	5	6	—	—	—	—	—
2015–16	Montreal Canadiens	NHL	21	3	2	5	8	—	—	—	—	—
2016–17	Montreal Canadiens	NHL	82	13	27	40	35	6	0	2	2	2
2017–18	Montreal Canadiens	NHL	52	8	17	25	34	—	—	—	—	—
2018–19	Montreal Canadiens	NHL	81	12	41	53	39	—	—	—	—	—
2019–20	Montreal Canadiens	NHL	71	13	34	47	32	10	1	2	3	6
2020–21	Montreal Canadiens	NHL	53	5	19	24	24	22	1	3	4	6
2021–22	Los Angeles Kings	NHL	79	27	24	51	38	7	3	2	5	2
2022–23	Los Angeles Kings	NHL	82	18	36	54	63	6	2	3	5	12
2023–24	Los Angeles Kings	NHL	78	17	30	47	18	5	0	1	1	4
2024–25	Los Angeles Kings	NHL	80	8	35	43	26	6	2	6	8	0
2025–26	Los Angeles Kings	NHL	30	0	5	5	6	—	—	—	—	—
2025–26	Montreal Canadiens	NHL	45	6	6	12	20	19	2	8	10	8
NHL totals			786	131	280	411	349	81	11	27	38	40

=== International ===
Year	Team	Event	Result	GP	G	A	Pts	PIM
2010	Canada Quebec	U17	6th	5	0	3	3	22
2010	Canada	IH18	1st place, gold medalist(s)	5	0	3	3	4
2013	Canada	WJC	4th	6	0	1	1	2
2025	Canada	WC	5th	8	0	2	2	2
Junior totals				16	0	7	7	28
Senior totals				8	0	2	2	2

== Awards and honours ==
Award	Year	Ref
CHL
CHL Canada/Russia Series	2010, 2011, 2012	
CHL/NHL Top Prospects Game	2011	
Canada–Russia Challenge	2012	
QMJHL
Guy Carbonneau Trophy	2011	
Montreal Canadiens
Jacques Beauchamp Molson Trophy	2017, 2019	

Awards and achievements
Preceded by Mark McNeill	Chicago Blackhawks first-round draft pick 2011	Succeeded by Teuvo Teräväinen
