= 2025–26 Ottawa Senators season =

Season of play of professional ice hockey team

2025–26 Ottawa Senators
- Division: 5th Atlantic
- Conference: 6th Eastern
- 2025–26 record: 44–27–11
- Home record: 23–12–6
- Road record: 21–15–5
- Goals for: 278
- Goals against: 246

Team information
- General manager: Steve Staios
- Coach: Travis Green
- Captain: Brady Tkachuk
- Alternate captains: Thomas Chabot; Claude Giroux
- Arena: Canadian Tire Centre
- Average attendance: 17,123
- Minor league affiliates: Belleville Senators (AHL); Allen Americans (ECHL)

Team leaders
- Goals: Tim Stützle (34)
- Assists: Tim Stützle (49)
- Points: Tim Stützle (83)
- Penalty minutes: Nick Cousins (92)
- Plus/minus: Artem Zub (+22)
- Wins: Linus Ullmark (28)
- Goals against average: James Reimer (2.35)

The 2025–26 Ottawa Senators season was the 34th season of the Ottawa Senators of the National Hockey League.

The Senators qualified for the playoffs for the second consecutive season. In the regular season, the team recovered from a last-place standing in January to qualify for the last playoff spot in April despite the loss of six defencemen to injury. In the playoffs, the Senators could not continue their winning pace and lost to the eventual Stanley Cup champion Carolina Hurricanes in the first round in four straight games.

== Team business ==
In a step forward in the process of building a new arena downtown, a land sale agreement for the LeBreton Flats site, was signed in August 2025 with the NCC.

The team will have a new third jersey that will be worn at four "Ignite The Red" home games. The new third jersey has a red base and a slightly modified logo chest crest with enhanced embroidery. The shoulder area is black with gold trim. The arms will have similar black stripes with gold trim. The player name lettering and numbers will be a different font. The shoulders will have the Senators 'S' secondary logo.

In October 2025, media website bookies.com surveyed the NHL arenas to determine the cost for a family of four to attend an NHL game. For four of the cheapest tickets, plus parking, two beers, two soft drinks and four hot dogs, the Senators were ranked the lowest-cost in the NHL at an average of US$182 per family, below the NHL average of US$304. Website statista.com had most recently ranked the Senators the third least-expensive in August 2024.

In February 2026, it was announced that the Senators will play the Montreal Canadiens in the Kraft Hockeyville Game, to be played in Trois-Rivieres, Quebec, celebrating the 2025 winner Saint-Boniface, Quebec.

In April 2026, the Senators announced that they had renewed their broadcast deal with Bell Media, owner of The Sports Network (TSN). The parties committed to a 12-year term, keeping Senators regional television broadcasts on TSN and RDS and local radio broadcasts on TSN 1200.

== Off-season ==
In a draft-day transaction, the Senators traded for the Los Angeles Kings' Jordan Spence, a right defenceman. The team did not offer contracts to goaltender Anton Forsberg, forwards Adam Gaudette, Matthew Highmore and Angus Crookshank and defenceman Travis Hamonic. All became unrestricted free agents and signed with other NHL teams. The team signed veteran centre Lars Eller as a free agent. Near the end of the pre-season, the team traded Zack MacEwen to New Jersey for Kurtis MacDermid.

== Regular season ==
Restricted free agent defenceman Maxence Guenette held out in a contract dispute and was dealt to the Philadelphia Flyers in November 2025 for former Senator defenceman Dennis Gilbert. Gilbert reported to Belleville.

The Eastern Conference was very competitive this season. While the Senators did not have a sub .500 month, the team dropped in the standings from December through January to a tie for last place in the Eastern Conference. During this time, goaltender Linus Ullmark took a personal leave and backup Leevi Merilainen struggled. The Senators would sign free agent veteran goaltender James Reimer who stabilized the goaltender position. For the season, the team had a sub .900 save percentage.

The team struggled on the penalty kill, placing it near the bottom in percentage. The team changed the coaching responsibility for the penalty kill from Nolan Baumgartner to Mike Yeo at mid-season.

At the March trade deadline, the team traded forward David Perron to the Detroit Red Wings for a 2026 fourth-round draft pick, and picked up forward Warren Foegele from the Los Angeles Kings along with an exchange of draft picks. Foegele scored in his first game with the Senators, paired with Lars Eller and Fabian Zetterlund on the fourth line.

Later in March, the team received some good news from the NHL head office when it was learned that the team would regain a 2026 NHL entry draft first-round pick, although the team would have to pay a US$1 million fine. The draft pick would be the last in the first round. The draft pick had been forfeited over a dispute over the status of a trade of Evgenii Dadonov to the Vegas Golden Knights who claimed that they had not been properly informed of a no-trade clause in Dadonov's contract. Dadonov subsequently voided a trade to the Dallas Stars by the Golden Knights.

In March and into April, while fighting for a playoff spot, the team suffered a long streak of injuries to its defencemen. First, Nick Jensen injured his knee and was finished for the season. Next, Jake Sanderson suffered an upper-body injury, putting him out for six weeks. Call-up Dennis Gilbert also injured his upper body. This was followed by Thomas Chabot who suffered a fractured right arm. Call-up Lassi Thomson was injured in the same game, versus the New York Rangers, the team managing a win with just four defencemen for most of the game. The team called up Carter Yakemchuk and Jorian Donovan, both NHL rookies, for the next game. Thomson returned and Donovan was returned to Belleville. In a game on March 31, Yakemchuk was injured with a concussion, necessitating the call-up of Cameron Crotty, who had not played in the NHL all season and who had only played two NHL games previously. On April 2, Tyler Kleven, their only uninjured left-shot defenceman) was hit by a shot to the upper body and injured.

Only two weeks after surgery on his arm, Chabot returned to the lineup against the Panthers on April 9. The surgery required two plates and screws to hold the bone in place and he wears extra protective equipment on his arm. He had not been expected to return until a possible second round of the playoffs.

=== Divisional standings ===
Atlantic Division
Pos	Team	GP	W	L	OTL	RW	GF	GA	GD	Pts
1	y – Buffalo Sabres	82	50	23	9	42	288	241	+47	109
2	x – Tampa Bay Lightning	82	50	26	6	40	290	231	+59	106
3	x – Montreal Canadiens	82	48	24	10	34	283	256	+27	106
4	x – Boston Bruins	82	45	27	10	33	272	250	+22	100
5	x – Ottawa Senators	82	44	27	11	38	278	246	+32	99
6	Detroit Red Wings	82	41	31	10	30	241	258	−17	92
7	Florida Panthers	82	40	38	4	32	251	276	−25	84
8	Toronto Maple Leafs	82	32	36	14	23	253	299	−46	78

Source: National Hockey League
Rules for classification: 1) Fewer number of games played (GP, only during regular season); 2) Greater number of regulation wins (RW); 3) Greater number of wins in regulation and overtime, excluding shootout wins (ROW); 4) Greater number of total wins, including shootouts (W); 5) Greater number of points earned in head-to-head play; if teams played an uneven number of head-to-head games, the result of the first game on the home ice of the team with the extra home game is discarded; 6) Greater goal differential (GD); 7) Greater number of goals scored (GF)
x – Clinched playoff spot; y – Clinched division

=== Conference standings ===
Eastern Conference Wild Card
Pos	Div	Team	GP	W	L	OTL	RW	GF	GA	GD	Pts
1	AT	x – Boston Bruins	82	45	27	10	33	272	250	+22	100
2	AT	x – Ottawa Senators	82	44	27	11	38	278	246	+32	99
3	ME	Washington Capitals	82	43	30	9	37	263	244	+19	95
4	AT	Detroit Red Wings	82	41	31	10	30	241	258	−17	92
5	ME	Columbus Blue Jackets	82	40	30	12	28	253	253	0	92
6	ME	New York Islanders	82	43	34	5	29	233	241	−8	91
7	ME	New Jersey Devils	82	42	37	3	29	230	254	−24	87
8	AT	Florida Panthers	82	40	38	4	32	251	276	−25	84
9	AT	Toronto Maple Leafs	82	32	36	14	23	253	299	−46	78
10	ME	New York Rangers	82	34	39	9	25	238	250	−12	77

Source: National Hockey League
Rules for classification: 1) Fewer number of games played (GP, only during regular season); 2) Greater number of regulation wins (RW); 3) Greater number of wins in regulation and overtime, excluding shootout wins (ROW); 4) Greater number of total wins, including shootouts (W); 5) Greater number of points earned in head-to-head play; if teams played an uneven number of head-to-head games, the result of the first game on the home ice of the team with the extra home game is discarded; 6) Greater goal differential (GD); 7) Greater number of goals scored (GF)
x – Clinched playoff spot

== Playoffs ==
With both a win against the New York Islanders and a loss by the Detroit Red Wings against the New Jersey Devils on April 11, 2026, the Senators clinched their second straight postseason berth and their first in consecutive years since the 2012–13 season.

=== Eastern Conference first round: Ottawa vs Carolina ===
As the second wild-card team, the Senators played division champion and conference leader Carolina Hurricanes. This was the first time the teams have played each other in a playoff. Carolina won the regular-season series two games to one.

In the first game, the Hurricanes played tight defensively and shut out the Senators 2-0. In game two, the Hurricanes built a two-goal lead before the Senators tied the game only to lose 3–2 in the second overtime period. Back at home in game three, the Senators drew a lot of penalties but could not score on the power play and lost 2-1. In the deciding game four, the game was tied into the third period before the Hurricanes scored on the power play to take the lead and they did not relinquish it. The game ended 4–2 to end the Senators season.

Highlights for the Senators included the play of goaltender Linus Ullmark and forward Drake Batherson. The injury woes continued for the Senators, losing Artem Zub in the first game, and Jake Sanderson in the third. Top forwards Tim Stützle and Brady Tkachuk were shut down by the Hurricanes, and neither scored, although both did deliver shots to the post and crossbar. The Senators held the Hurricanes to only two power play goals in the series, but only scored two power play goals themselves.

== Schedule and results ==
=== Preseason ===
The preseason schedule was published on June 26, 2025.

2025 preseason game log: 3–3–0 (home: 1–2–0; road: 2–1–0)
#	Date	Visitor	Score	Home	OT	Decision	Attendance	Record	Recap
1	September 21	Toronto	4–3	Ottawa		Sogaard	16,254	0–1–0
2	September 23	Ottawa	3–2	Toronto	OT	Shepard	15,162	1–1–0
3	September 28^{A}	New Jersey	0–2	Ottawa		Ullmark	12,159	2–1–0
4	September 30^{A}	Montreal	5–0	Ottawa		Merilainen	18,259	2–2–0
5	October 2	Ottawa	1–7	St. Louis		Merilainen	15,922	2–3–0
6	October 4	Ottawa	3–1	Montreal		Ullmark	20,962	3–3–0
Notes:^{A} Game played at the Videotron Centre in Quebec City, Quebec.

=== Regular season ===
The Ottawa Senators regular season schedule was released on July 16, 2025.

2025–26 game log

October: 6–5–1 (home: 4–2–1; road: 2–3–0)
#	Date	Visitor	Score	Home	OT	Decision	Attendance	Record	Pts	Recap
1	October 9	Ottawa	5–4	Tampa Bay		Ullmark	19,092	1–0–0	2
2	October 11	Ottawa	2–6	Florida		Ullmark	19,704	1–1–0	2
3	October 13	Nashville	4–1	Ottawa		Ullmark	18,500	1–2–0	2
4	October 15	Ottawa	4–8	Buffalo		Merilainen	13,993	1–3–0	2
5	October 16	Seattle	3–4	Ottawa	SO	Ullmark	15,736	2–3–0	4
6	October 18	NY Islanders	5–4	Ottawa		Ullmark	15,929	2–4–0	4
7	October 21	Edmonton	3–2	Ottawa	OT	Ullmark	17,436	2–4–1	5
8	October 23	Philadelphia	1–2	Ottawa		Ullmark	16,380	3–4–1	7
9	October 25	Ottawa	7–1	Washington		Ullmark	18,347	4–4–1	9
10	October 27	Boston	2–7	Ottawa		Merilainen	16,168	5–4–1	11
11	October 28	Ottawa	3–7	Chicago		Ullmark	15,100	5–5–1	11
12	October 30	Calgary	3–4	Ottawa	SO	Ullmark	16,790	6–5–1	13

November: 6–4–3 (home: 2–1–1; road: 4–3–2)
#	Date	Visitor	Score	Home	OT	Decision	Attendance	Record	Pts	Recap
13	November 1	Ottawa	3–4	Montreal	OT	Ullmark	20,962	6–5–2	14
14	November 6	Ottawa	2–3	Boston	OT	Ullmark	17,850	6–5–3	15
15	November 8	Ottawa	3–2	Philadelphia	OT	Ullmark	18,188	7–5–3	17
16	November 9	Utah	2–4	Ottawa		Merilainen	17,470	8–5–3	19
17	November 11	Dallas	3–2	Ottawa	OT	Ullmark	16,542	8–5–4	20
18	November 13	Boston	3–5	Ottawa		Merilainen	16,049	9–5–4	22
19	November 15	Los Angeles	1–0	Ottawa		Ullmark	17,772	9–6–4	22
20	November 20	Ottawa	3–2	Anaheim		Ullmark	14,564	10–6–4	24
21	November 22	Ottawa	3–2	San Jose		Ullmark	17,435	11–6–4	26
22	November 24	Ottawa	1–2	Los Angeles		Merilainen	17,421	11–7–4	26
23	November 26	Ottawa	4–3	Vegas	SO	Ullmark	17,791	12–7–4	28
24	November 28	Ottawa	3–4	St. Louis		Merilainen	18,096	12–8–4	28
25	November 30	Ottawa	1–6	Dallas		Ullmark	18,532	12–9–4	28

December: 6–6–1 (home: 2–4–1; road: 4–2–0)
#	Date	Visitor	Score	Home	OT	Decision	Attendance	Record	Pts	Recap
26	December 2	Ottawa	5–2	Montreal		Ullmark	20,962	13–9–4	30
27	December 4	NY Rangers	4–2	Ottawa		Merilainen	15,533	13–10–4	30
28	December 6	St. Louis	2–1	Ottawa		Ullmark	16,064	13–11–4	30
29	December 9	New Jersey	4–3	Ottawa		Ullmark	16,159	13–12–4	30
30	December 11	Ottawa	6–3	Columbus		Ullmark	15,059	14–12–4	32
31	December 13	Ottawa	2–3	Minnesota		Merilainen	18,058	14–13–4	32
32	December 15	Ottawa	3–2	Winnipeg	OT	Ullmark	13,566	15–13–4	34
33	December 18	Pittsburgh	0–4	Ottawa		Ullmark	17,260	16–13–4	36
34	December 20	Chicago	4–6	Ottawa		Merilainen	18,254	17–13–4	38
35	December 21	Ottawa	6–2	Boston		Ullmark	17,850	18–13–4	40
36	December 23	Buffalo	3–2	Ottawa	OT	Ullmark	17,753	18–13–5	41
37	December 27	Ottawa	5–7	Toronto		Merilainen	18,859	18–14–5	41
38	December 29	Columbus	4–1	Ottawa		Merilainen	17,902	18–15–5	41

January: 8–6–2 (home: 6–3–1; road: 2–3–1)
#	Date	Visitor	Score	Home	OT	Decision	Attendance	Record	Pts	Recap
39	January 1	Washington	3–4	Ottawa		Merilainen	18,433	19–15–5	43
40	January 3	Winnipeg	2–4	Ottawa		Merilainen	16,872	20–15–5	45
41	January 5	Detroit	5–3	Ottawa		Shepard	16,981	20–16–5	45
42	January 7	Ottawa	1–3	Utah		Merilainen	12,478	20–17–5	45
43	January 8	Ottawa	2–8	Colorado		Merilainen	18,092	20–18–5	45
44	January 10	Florida	3–2	Ottawa		Merilainen	17,085	20–19–5	45
45	January 13	Vancouver	1–2	Ottawa		Merilainen	15,801	21–19–5	47
46	January 14	Ottawa	8–4	NY Rangers		Merilainen	17,776	22–19–5	49
47	January 17	Montreal	6–5	Ottawa	OT	Merilainen	18,020	22–19–6	50
48	January 18	Ottawa	3–4	Detroit	OT	Reimer	19,515	22–19–7	51
49	January 20	Ottawa	4–1	Columbus		Reimer	13,278	23–19–7	53
50	January 22	Ottawa	3–5	Nashville		Reimer	17,159	23–20–7	53
51	January 24	Carolina	4–1	Ottawa		Reimer	17,155	23–21–7	53
52	January 25	Vegas	1–7	Ottawa		Sogaard	17,025	24–21–7	55
53	January 28	Colorado	2–5	Ottawa		Reimer	17,007	25–21–7	57
54	January 31	New Jersey	1–4	Ottawa		Ullmark	18,319	26–21–7	59

February: 3–1–1 (home: 0–0–1; road: 3–1–0)
#	Date	Visitor	Score	Home	OT	Decision	Attendance	Record	Pts	Recap
55	February 2	Ottawa	3–2	Pittsburgh		Ullmark	17,967	27–21–7	61
56	February 3	Ottawa	3–4	Carolina		Reimer	18,299	27–22–7	61
57	February 5	Ottawa	2–1	Philadelphia	OT	Reimer	19,220	28–22–7	63
58	February 26	Detroit	2–1	Ottawa	OT	Ullmark	17,190	28–22–8	64
59	February 28	Ottawa	5–2	Toronto		Ullmark	18,952	29–22–8	66

March: 9–4–2 (home: 4–1–1; road: 5–3–1)
#	Date	Visitor	Score	Home	OT	Decision	Attendance	Record	Pts	Recap
60	March 3	Ottawa	4–5	Edmonton	OT	Ullmark	18,347	29–22–9	67
61	March 5	Ottawa	4–1	Calgary		Ullmark	17,195	30–22–9	69
62	March 7	Ottawa	7–4	Seattle		Ullmark	17,151	31–22–9	71
63	March 9	Ottawa	2–0	Vancouver		Reimer	18,228	32–22–9	73
64	March 11	Montreal	3–2	Ottawa		Ullmark	17,229	32–23–9	73
65	March 14	Anaheim	0–2	Ottawa		Ullmark	18,381	33–23–9	75
66	March 15	San Jose	4–7	Ottawa		Ullmark	18,764	34–23–9	77
67	March 18	Ottawa	1–4	Washington		Ullmark	18,347	34–24–9	77
68	March 19	NY Islanders	2–3	Ottawa		Reimer	16,875	35–24–9	79
69	March 21	Toronto	2–5	Ottawa		Ullmark	17,331	36–24–9	81
70	March 23	Ottawa	2–1	NY Rangers		Reimer	17,204	37–24–9	83
71	March 24	Ottawa	3–2	Detroit		Ullmark	19,515	38–24–9	85
72	March 26	Pittsburgh	4–3	Ottawa	SO	Ullmark	17,545	38–24–10	86
73	March 28	Ottawa	2–4	Tampa Bay		Reimer	19,095	38–25–10	86
74	March 31	Ottawa	3–6	Florida		Ullmark	17,672	38–26–10	86

April: 6–1–1 (home: 5–1–0; road: 1–0–1)
#	Date	Visitor	Score	Home	OT	Decision	Attendance	Record	Pts	Recap
75	April 2	Buffalo	1–4	Ottawa		Ullmark	17,086	39–26–10	88
76	April 4	Minnesota	4–1	Ottawa		Ullmark	18,482	39–27–10	88
77	April 5	Carolina	3–6	Ottawa		Ullmark	16,857	40–27–10	90
78	April 7	Tampa Bay	2–6	Ottawa		Ullmark	16,603	41–27–10	92
79	April 9	Florida	1–5	Ottawa		Ullmark	17,483	42–27–10	94
80	April 11	Ottawa	3–0	NY Islanders		Ullmark	17,255	43–27–10	96
81	April 12	Ottawa	3–4	New Jersey	OT	Reimer	16,514	43–27–11	97
82	April 15	Toronto	1–3	Ottawa		Reimer	15,919	44–27–11	99

Legend: Win (2 points) Loss (0 points) Overtime/shootout loss (1 point)

=== Playoffs ===
2026 Stanley Cup playoffs

Eastern Conference First Round vs. (M1) Carolina Hurricanes: Carolina wins series 4–0
#	Date	Visitor	Score	Home	OT	Decision	Attendance	Series	Recap
1	April 18	Ottawa	0–2	Carolina		Ullmark	18,588	0–1
2	April 20	Ottawa	2–3	Carolina	2OT	Ullmark	18,591	0–2
3	April 23	Carolina	2–1	Ottawa		Ullmark	18,753	0–3
4	April 25	Carolina	4–2	Ottawa		Ullmark	18,793	0–4

Legend: Win Loss

== Player statistics ==
Final Stats

=== Skaters ===
Regular season
Player	GP	G	A	Pts	+/−	PIM
Tim Stützle	80	34	49	83	+7	39
Drake Batherson	79	33	38	71	-7	33
Dylan Cozens	82	28	31	59	-7	59
Brady Tkachuk	60	22	37	59	+4	71
Jake Sanderson	67	14	40	54	+16	8
Claude Giroux	82	14	35	49	+20	22
Shane Pinto	72	23	23	46	+6	42
Michael Amadio	81	15	20	35	+13	18
Ridly Greig	77	13	22	35	+12	83
Fabian Zetterlund	82	17	16	33	-1	16
Thomas Chabot	57	7	24	31	+6	22
Jordan Spence	73	7	24	31	+15	22
Artem Zub	81	5	25	30	+22	57
David Perron^{‡}	49	10	15	25	+2	22
Nick Cousins	81	9	14	23	+8	92
Tyler Kleven	70	3	15	18	+2	53
Nick Jensen	61	4	13	17	-2	22
Lars Eller	68	5	10	15	+5	12
Stephen Halliday	30	4	7	11	0	2
Warren Foegele^{†}	21	6	2	8	+6	4
Nikolas Matinpalo	50	0	5	5	-1	16
Lassi Thomson	11	0	3	3	+3	0
Olle Lycksell	7	1	1	2	-2	0
Carter Yakemchuk	4	1	1	2	-1	2
Arthur Kaliyev	2	0	1	1	0	0
Kurtis MacDermid	19	0	1	1	-5	33
Dennis Gilbert^{†}	8	0	1	1	0	2
Cameron Crotty	6	0	1	1	0	0
Hayden Hodgson	10	0	0	0	-2	11
Donovan Sebrango^{‡}	2	0	0	0	-1	5
Xavier Bourgault	2	0	0	0	-1	0
Jorian Donovan	2	0	0	0	0	0

Playoffs
Player	GP	G	A	Pts	+/−	PIM
Drake Batherson	4	3	1	4	-3	4
Dylan Cozens	4	2	0	2	0	0
Jake Sanderson	3	0	2	2	+2	2
Carter Yakemchuk	1	0	2	2	-1	0
Nick Cousins	4	0	1	1	-1	2
Ridly Greig	4	0	1	1	+1	2
Tim Stützle	4	0	1	1	-4	0
Claude Giroux	4	0	0	0	0	0
Lars Eller	4	0	0	0	0	0
Warren Foegele	4	0	0	0	-1	0
Michael Amadio	4	0	0	0	-1	2
Thomas Chabot	4	0	0	0	-6	2
Nikolas Matinpalo	4	0	0	0	+1	2
Fabian Zetterlund	4	0	0	0	-1	2
Brady Tkachuk	4	0	0	0	-4	13
Shane Pinto	4	0	0	0	-3	2
Jordan Spence	4	0	0	0	-3	2
Dennis Gilbert	3	0	0	0	-1	6
Tyler Kleven	2	0	0	0	0	2
Artem Zub	1	0	0	0	0	0
Cameron Crotty	1	0	0	0	-1	0
Lassi Thomson	1	0	0	0	0	0

=== Goaltenders ===
Regular season
Player	GP	GS	TOI	W	L	OT	GA	GAA	SA	SV%	SO	G	A	PIM
Linus Ullmark	49	49	2883:28	28	12	8	131	2.73	1198	.891	3	0	1	2
Leevi Merilainen	20	19	1094:29	8	10	1	64	3.51	457	.860	0	0	0	0
James Reimer	14	13	817:47	7	4	2	33	2.42	289	.886	1	0	0	0
Mads Sogaard	2	1	77:25	1	0	0	6	4.65	36	.833	0	0	0	0
Hunter Shepard^{‡}	1	0	35:47	0	1	0	2	3.35	12	.833	0	0	0	0

Playoffs
Player	GP	GS	TOI	W	L	GA	GAA	SA	SV%	SO	G	A	PIM
Linus Ullmark	4	4	266:25	0	4	9	2.03	133	.932	0	0	0	0

^{†}Denotes player spent time with another team before joining the Senators. Stats reflect time with the Senators only.
^{‡}No longer with the Senators.

== Awards and milestones ==
=== Awards ===
Player	Award	Date	Ref.
Shane Pinto	NHL Second Star of the Week	October 11, 2025	
Linus Ullmark	NHL Second Star of the Week	December 22, 2025	
Linus Ullmark	NHL Second Star of the Week	April 13, 2026	

=== Milestones ===
Player	Milestone	Date	Ref.
Tyler Kleven	100th NHL game	October 18, 2025	
Drake Batherson	300th NHL point	October 26, 2025	
Linus Ullmark	300th NHL game	October 28, 2025	
Drake Batherson	400th NHL game	October 30, 2025	
Stephen Halliday	1st NHL game 1st NHL assist 1st NHL point	November 20, 2025	
Nick Cousins	200th NHL point	November 20, 2025	
David Perron	1200th NHL game	December 2, 2025	
Kurtis MacDermid	300th NHL game	December 15, 2025	
Tim Stützle	400th NHL game	December 18, 2025	
David Perron	800th NHL point	December 18, 2025	
Xavier Bourgault	1st NHL game	December 27, 2025	
Claude Giroux	1300th NHL game	December 27, 2025	
Brady Tkachuk	200th NHL goal	January 14, 2026	
Stephen Halliday	1st NHL goal	January 22, 2026	
Nick Cousins	700th NHL game	February 28, 2026	
Jorian Donovan	1st NHL game	March 24, 2026	
Carter Yakemchuk	1st NHL game 1st NHL goal 1st NHL assist 1st NHL point	March 24, 2026	
Cameron Crotty	1st NHL point	April 7, 2026	

== Transactions ==
The Senators have been involved in the following transactions during the 2025–26 season.

=== Key ===
† Contract is entry-level.
‡ Contract takes effect in the 2026–27 season.

=== Trades ===
Date	Details		Ref
June 27, 2025	To Nashville Predators 1st-round pick in 2025	To Ottawa Senators 1st-round pick in 2025; 3rd-round pick in 2025	
June 28, 2025	To Los Angeles Kings 3rd-round pick in 2025; 6th-round pick in 2026	To Ottawa Senators Jordan Spence	
October 3, 2025	To New Jersey Devils Zack MacEwen	To Ottawa Senators Kurtis MacDermid	
November 17, 2025	To Philadelphia Flyers Maxence Guenette	To Ottawa Senators Dennis Gilbert	
March 5, 2026	To Los Angeles Kings 2nd-round pick in 2026; Conditional 3rd-round pick in 2026	To Ottawa Senators Warren Foegele; Conditional 3rd-round pick in 2026	
March 5, 2026	To Detroit Red Wings David Perron	To Ottawa Senators Conditional 4th-round pick in 2026	
March 6, 2026	To Washington Capitals Wyatt Bongiovanni	To Ottawa Senators Graeme Clarke	
March 12, 2026	To Los Angeles Kings Jan Jenik	To Ottawa Senators Samuel Bolduc	
March 13, 2026	To Montreal Canadiens Jake Chiasson; Hunter Shepard	To Ottawa Senators Riley Kidney	
June 21, 2026	To Florida Panthers Brady Tkachuk	To Ottawa Senators FLA's 1st-round pick in 2026; TBL's 1st-round pick in 2026; FLA's 1st-round pick in 2029; FLA's 2nd-round pick in 2027	
June 23, 2026	To San Jose Sharks 1st-round pick in 2026	To Ottawa Senators William Eklund; Kasper Halttunen; Brandon Svoboda	
June 26, 2026	To Toronto Maple Leafs 5th-round pick in 2027	To Ottawa Senators Samuel Ersson	
June 26, 2026	To Chicago Blackhawks 6th-round pick in 2027	To Ottawa Senators Andre Burakovsky	

=== Players acquired ===
Date	Player	Former team	Term	Via	Ref
July 1, 2025	Lars Eller	Washington Capitals	1-year	Free agency	
July 1, 2025	Olle Lycksell	Philadelphia Flyers	1-year	Free agency	
July 2, 2025	Arthur Kaliyev	New York Rangers	1-year	Free agency	
July 2, 2025	Hunter Shepard	Washington Capitals	1-year	Free agency	
July 3, 2025	Jackson Parsons	Kitchener Rangers	3-year†	Free agency	
August 25, 2025	Cameron Crotty	Minnesota Wild	2-year	Free agency	
January 12, 2026	James Reimer	Buffalo Sabres	1-year	Free agency	
June 15, 2026	Eskild Bakke Olsen	Linköping HC (SHL)	1-year†‡	Free agency	

=== Players lost ===
Date	Player	New team	Term	Via	Ref
July 1, 2025	Angus Crookshank	New Jersey Devils	2-year	Free agency	
July 1, 2025	Anton Forsberg	Los Angeles Kings	2-year	Free agency	
July 1, 2025	Adam Gaudette	San Jose Sharks	2-year	Free agency	
July 1, 2025	Dennis Gilbert	Philadelphia Flyers	1-year	Free agency	
July 1, 2025	Matthew Highmore	New York Islanders	1-year	Free agency	
July 1, 2025	Cole Reinhardt	Vegas Golden Knights	2-year	Free agency	
July 2, 2025	Jeremy Davies	Vegas Golden Knights	2-year	Free agency	
August 15, 2025	Travis Hamonic	Detroit Red Wings	1-year	Free agency	
October 15, 2025	Donovan Sebrango	Florida Panthers		Waivers	
May 4, 2026	Olle Lycksell	HC Lugano (NL)	3-year	Free agency	
May 8, 2026	Lassi Thomson	HC Lugano (NL)	2-year	Free agency	

=== Player signings ===
Date	Player	Term	Ref
June 29, 2025	Claude Giroux	1-year	
June 30, 2025	Nick Cousins	1-year	
June 30, 2025	Leevi Merilainen	1-year	
July 1, 2025	Wyatt Bongiovanni	1-year	
July 3, 2025	Hayden Hodgson	2-year	
July 18, 2025	Xavier Bourgault	1-year	
August 25, 2025	Jan Jenik	1-year	
September 3, 2025	Donovan Sebrango	1-year	
November 13, 2025	Shane Pinto	4-year‡	
March 25, 2026	Gabriel Eliasson	3-year†‡	
March 30, 2026	Kevin Reidler	2-year†‡	
March 30, 2026	Hoyt Stanley	3-year†‡	
April 15, 2026	Blake Montgomery	3-year†‡	
April 21, 2026	Lucas Beckman	3-year†‡	
May 5, 2026	Stephen Halliday	2-year‡	
June 26, 2026	Samuel Bolduc	1-year‡	
June 26, 2026	Jordan Spence	4-year‡	
June 26, 2026	Djibril Toure	1-year‡	

== Draft picks ==
The 2025 NHL entry draft was held on June 27 and 28 at the Peacock Theatre in Los Angeles, California. Ottawa chose the following players:

Round	Overall	Player	Position	Nationality	Club team
1	23 (Note: (from Nashville))	Logan Hensler	Defence	United States	University of Wisconsin (B1G)
3	93 (Note: (from Carolina via WSH))	Blake Vanek	Forward	United States	Stillwater High School (USHS-MN)
4	97 (Note: (from San Jose))	Lucas Beckman	Goaltender	Canada	Baie-Comeau Drakkar (QMJHL)
5	149	Dmitri Isayev	Left Wing	Russia	Avtomobilist Yekaterinburg Jr. (MHL)
6	181	Bruno Idzan	Left Wing	Croatia	Lincoln Stars (USHL)
7	213	Andrei Trofimov	Goaltender	Russia	Stalnye Lisy (MHL)

Bruno Idzan is the first Croatian-born player to have been selected in the NHL entry draft. The Senators chose two Russian players, their first Russian players selected in the draft since 2005. Blake Vanek is the son of former NHL player Thomas Vanek.

=== Draft-related transactions ===
1. The Nashville Predators acquired the Senators' 21st overall pick for the 23rd overall pick and a third-round pick (67th overall) in this draft.
2. The Senators' second-round pick went to the San Jose Sharks as the result of a trade on March 7, 2025, that sent Tristen Robins, Fabian Zetterlund and a fourth-round pick in 2025 to Ottawa in exchange for Noah Gregor, Zack Ostapchuk and this pick.
3. The Senators' third-round pick (85th-overall) went to the Vegas Golden Knights as the result of a trade on June 28, 2025, that sent Washington's third-round pick in 2025 (91st overall) and a fifth-round pick in 2025 (154th overall) to Pittsburgh in exchange for this pick.
  Pittsburgh previously acquired this pick as the result of a trade on August 13, 2024, that sent St. Louis' second-round pick in 2025 and a fifth-round pick in 2026 to St. Louis in exchange for a second-round pick in 2026 and this pick.
  St. Louis previously acquired this pick as the result of a trade on July 2, 2024, that sent future considerations to Ottawa in exchange for Mathieu Joseph and this pick.
4. The Carolina Hurricanesꞌ third-round pick (91st-overall) went to the Senators as the result of a trade on June 28, 2025, that sent Florida's third-round pick in 2025 (96th overall) and a seventh-round pick in 2027 to Washington in exchange for this pick.
  Washington previously acquired this pick as the result of a trade on March 8, 2024, that sent Evgeny Kuznetsov to Carolina in exchange for this pick.
5. The San Jose Sharks' fourth-round pick (97th-overal)) went to the Senators as the result of a trade on March 7, 2025, that sent Noah Gregor, Zack Ostapchuk and a second-round pick in 2025 to San Jose in exchange for Tristen Robins, Fabian Zetterlund and this pick.
6. The Senators' fourth-round pick (117th-overall) went to the Edmonton Oilers as the result of a trade on June 25, 2025, that sent Evander Kane to Vancouver in exchange for this pick.
  Vancouver previously acquired this pick as the result of a trade on August 18, 2024, that sent Vasily Podkolzin to Edmonton in exchange for this pick.
  Edmonton previously acquired this pick as the result of a trade on July 15, 2024, that sent Xavier Bourgault and Jake Chiasson to Ottawa in exchange for Roby Jarventie and this pick.
