= 2025–26 Philadelphia Flyers season =

National Hockey League season

2025–26 Philadelphia Flyers
- Division: 3rd Metropolitan
- Conference: 8th Eastern
- 2025–26 record: 43–27–12
- Home record: 20–13–8
- Road record: 23–14–4
- Goals for: 250
- Goals against: 243

Team information
- General manager: Daniel Briere
- Coach: Rick Tocchet
- Captain: Sean Couturier
- Alternate captains: Travis Konecny; Travis Sanheim
- Arena: Xfinity Mobile Arena
- Minor league affiliates: Lehigh Valley Phantoms (AHL); Reading Royals (ECHL)

Team leaders
- Goals: Owen Tippett (28)
- Assists: Trevor Zegras (41)
- Points: Travis Konecny (68)
- Penalty minutes: Matvei Michkov (71)
- Plus/minus: Noah Cates (+26)
- Wins: Daniel Vladar (29)
- Goals against average: Daniel Vladar (2.42)

The 2025–26 Philadelphia Flyers season was the 59th season for the National Hockey League (NHL) franchise that was established on June 5, 1967. The team's home arena, known as the Wells Fargo Center since 2010, was renamed the Xfinity Mobile Arena on August 14, 2025.

On April 13, 2026, the Flyers clinched a spot in the Stanley Cup playoffs with a 3–2 shootout victory over the Carolina Hurricanes, qualifying for the playoffs for the first time since the 2019–20 season. And their first playoff berth in a full season since the 2017–18 season.

After defeating the Pittsburgh Penguins in the first round in six games, the Flyers were swept in the second round by the eventual Stanley Cup champion Carolina Hurricanes.

== Off-season ==
On May 14, 2025, former Flyer Rick Tocchet was hired as the 25th head coach in franchise history. Tocchet, who had coached the Vancouver Canucks for the past three seasons and won the Jack Adams Award in 2024, signed a reported five-year contract that made him one of the NHL's highest paid coaches. Associate coach Brad Shaw, who had served as interim head coach after John Tortorella was fired on March 27, and was a candidate for the head coach job, left the team and was named an assistant for the New Jersey Devils.

Hired to fill out the coaching staff were assistant coaches Todd Reirden, Jaroslav Svejkovsky, Jay Varady, and video coach Dylan Crawford. Reirden had most recently been an associate coach with the Pittsburgh Penguins for four seasons while Varady served as an assistant for the past three seasons with the Detroit Red Wings. Svejkovsky and Crawford had worked under Tocchet in Vancouver. Previous assistants Rocky Thompson, Darryl Williams, and skills coach Angelo Ricci were not retained.

== Standings ==
=== Divisional standings ===
Metropolitan Division
Pos	Team	GP	W	L	OTL	RW	GF	GA	GD	Pts
1	z – Carolina Hurricanes	82	53	22	7	39	296	240	+56	113
2	x – Pittsburgh Penguins	82	41	25	16	34	293	268	+25	98
3	x – Philadelphia Flyers	82	43	27	12	27	250	243	+7	98
4	Washington Capitals	82	43	30	9	37	263	244	+19	95
5	Columbus Blue Jackets	82	40	30	12	28	253	253	0	92
6	New York Islanders	82	43	34	5	29	233	241	−8	91
7	New Jersey Devils	82	42	37	3	29	230	254	−24	87
8	New York Rangers	82	34	39	9	25	238	250	−12	77

Source: National Hockey League
Rules for classification: 1) Fewer number of games played (GP, only during regular season); 2) Greater number of regulation wins (RW); 3) Greater number of wins in regulation and overtime, excluding shootout wins (ROW); 4) Greater number of total wins, including shootouts (W); 5) Greater number of points earned in head-to-head play; if teams played an uneven number of head-to-head games, the result of the first game on the home ice of the team with the extra home game is discarded; 6) Greater goal differential (GD); 7) Greater number of goals scored (GF)
x – Clinched playoff spot; z – Clinched conference

=== Conference standings ===
Eastern Conference Wild Card
Pos	Div	Team	GP	W	L	OTL	RW	GF	GA	GD	Pts
1	AT	x – Boston Bruins	82	45	27	10	33	272	250	+22	100
2	AT	x – Ottawa Senators	82	44	27	11	38	278	246	+32	99
3	ME	Washington Capitals	82	43	30	9	37	263	244	+19	95
4	AT	Detroit Red Wings	82	41	31	10	30	241	258	−17	92
5	ME	Columbus Blue Jackets	82	40	30	12	28	253	253	0	92
6	ME	New York Islanders	82	43	34	5	29	233	241	−8	91
7	ME	New Jersey Devils	82	42	37	3	29	230	254	−24	87
8	AT	Florida Panthers	82	40	38	4	32	251	276	−25	84
9	AT	Toronto Maple Leafs	82	32	36	14	23	253	299	−46	78
10	ME	New York Rangers	82	34	39	9	25	238	250	−12	77

Source: National Hockey League
Rules for classification: 1) Fewer number of games played (GP, only during regular season); 2) Greater number of regulation wins (RW); 3) Greater number of wins in regulation and overtime, excluding shootout wins (ROW); 4) Greater number of total wins, including shootouts (W); 5) Greater number of points earned in head-to-head play; if teams played an uneven number of head-to-head games, the result of the first game on the home ice of the team with the extra home game is discarded; 6) Greater goal differential (GD); 7) Greater number of goals scored (GF)
x – Clinched playoff spot

== Schedule and results ==
=== Preseason ===
The preseason schedule was announced on June 24, 2025. It was later announced the September 25 game against the Washington Capitals will be played at the Giant Center in Hershey, Pennsylvania.

2025 preseason game log: 3–4–0 (home: 1–2–0; road: 2–2–0)

Game	Date	Opponent	Score	OT	Decision	Location	Attendance	Record	Recap
1	September 21	@ NY Islanders	3–2	SO	Bjarnason	UBS Arena	8,348	1–0–0	W
2	September 23	@ Montreal	2–4		Kolosov	Bell Centre	20,429	1–1–0	L
3^{A}	September 25	@ Washington	1–5		Kolosov	Giant Center	10,420	1–2–0	L
4	September 27	Boston	3–4		Ersson	Xfinity Mobile Arena	14,084	1–3–0	L
5	September 29	@ Boston	3–2	SO	Vladar	TD Garden	17,850	2–3–0	W
6	October 2	NY Islanders	3–4		Ersson	Xfinity Mobile Arena	12,530	2–4–0	L
7	October 4	New Jersey	4–3	SO	Vladar	Xfinity Mobile Arena	14,795	3–4–0	W

Legend: Win Loss OT/SO loss ^{A} – Game played in Hershey, Pennsylvania

=== Regular season ===
The regular season schedule was announced on July 16, 2025.

2025–26 game log
October: 6–3–1 (home: 6–1–0; road: 0–2–1)

Game	Date	Opponent	Score	OT	Decision	Location	Attendance	Record	Points	Recap
1	October 9	@ Florida	1–2		Vladar	Amerant Bank Arena	19,431	0–1–0	0	L
2	October 11	@ Carolina	3–4	OT	Ersson	Lenovo Center	18,357	0–1–1	1	OTL
3	October 13	Florida	5–2		Vladar	Xfinity Mobile Arena	19,421	1–1–1	3	W
4	October 16	Winnipeg	2–5		Ersson	Xfinity Mobile Arena	16,170	1–2–1	3	L
5	October 18	Minnesota	2–1	OT	Vladar	Xfinity Mobile Arena	17,011	2–2–1	5	W
6	October 20	Seattle	5–2		Vladar	Xfinity Mobile Arena	16,099	3–2–1	7	W
7	October 23	@ Ottawa	1–2		Vladar	Canadian Tire Centre	16,380	3–3–1	7	L
8	October 25	NY Islanders	4–3	SO	Ersson	Xfinity Mobile Arena	16,640	4–3–1	9	W
9	October 28	Pittsburgh	3–2	SO	Ersson	Xfinity Mobile Arena	17,245	5–3–1	11	W
10	October 30	Nashville	4–1		Vladar	Xfinity Mobile Arena	15,812	6–3–1	13	W

November: 8–4–2 (home: 2–2–2; road: 6–2–0)

Game	Date	Opponent	Score	OT	Decision	Location	Attendance	Record	Points	Recap
11	November 1	Toronto	2–5		Vladar	Xfinity Mobile Arena	17,846	6–4–1	13	L
12	November 2	Calgary	1–2		Kolosov	Xfinity Mobile Arena	15,291	6–5–1	13	L
13	November 4	@ Montreal	5–4	SO	Vladar	Bell Centre	20,962	7–5–1	15	W
14	November 6	@ Nashville	3–1		Vladar	Bridgestone Arena	17,159	8–5–1	17	W
15	November 8	Ottawa	2–3	OT	Ersson	Xfinity Mobile Arena	18,188	8–5–2	18	OTL
16	November 12	Edmonton	1–2	OT	Vladar	Xfinity Mobile Arena	18,480	8–5–3	19	OTL
17	November 14	@ St. Louis	6–5	SO	Ersson	Enterprise Center	17,581	9–5–3	21	W
18	November 15	@ Dallas	1–5		Vladar	American Airlines Center	18,532	9–6–3	21	L
19	November 20	St. Louis	3–2	OT	Vladar	Xfinity Mobile Arena	17,677	10–6–3	23	W
20	November 22	New Jersey	6–3		Vladar	Xfinity Mobile Arena	18,342	11–6–3	25	W
21	November 24	@ Tampa Bay	0–3		Ersson	Benchmark International Arena	19,092	11–7–3	25	L
22	November 26	@ Florida	4–2		Vladar	Amerant Bank Arena	19,729	12–7–3	27	W
23	November 28	@ NY Islanders	4–3	SO	Ersson	UBS Arena	17,255	13–7–3	29	W
24	November 29	@ New Jersey	5–3		Vladar	Prudential Center	16,157	14–7–3	31	W

December: 6–5–4 (home: 3–2–2; road: 3–3–2)

Game	Date	Opponent	Score	OT	Decision	Location	Attendance	Record	Points	Recap
25	December 1	Pittsburgh	1–5		Vladar	Xfinity Mobile Arena	17,338	14–8–3	31	L
26	December 3	Buffalo	5–2		Ersson	Xfinity Mobile Arena	17,116	15–8–3	33	W
27	December 7	Colorado	2–3		Ersson	Xfinity Mobile Arena	18,606	15–9–3	33	L
28	December 9	San Jose	4–1		Vladar	Xfinity Mobile Arena	17,497	16–9–3	35	W
29	December 11	Vegas	2–3	OT	Vladar	Xfinity Mobile Arena	17,585	16–9–4	36	OTL
30	December 13	Carolina	3–4	SO	Ersson	Xfinity Mobile Arena	17,726	16–9–5	37	OTL
31	December 14	@ Carolina	2–3	SO	Vladar	Lenovo Center	18,125	16–9–6	38	OTL
32	December 16	@ Montreal	4–1		Vladar	Bell Centre	20,962	17–9–6	40	W
33	December 18	@ Buffalo	3–5		Ersson	KeyBank Center	16,055	17–10–6	40	L
34	December 20	@ NY Rangers	4–5	SO	Ersson	Madison Square Garden	18,006	17–10–7	41	OTL
35	December 22	Vancouver	5–2		Vladar	Xfinity Mobile Arena	19,994	18–10–7	43	W
36	December 23	@ Chicago	3–1		Ersson	United Center	20,256	19–10–7	45	W
37	December 28	@ Seattle	1–4		Vladar	Climate Pledge Arena	17,151	19–11–7	45	L
38	December 30	@ Vancouver	6–3		Vladar	Rogers Arena	18,853	20–11–7	47	W
39	December 31	@ Calgary	1–5		Ersson	Scotiabank Saddledome	18,739	20–12–7	47	L

January: 4–8–3 (home: 1–4–2; road: 3–4–1)

Game	Date	Opponent	Score	OT	Decision	Location	Attendance	Record	Points	Recap
40	January 3	@ Edmonton	5–2		Vladar	Rogers Place	18,347	21–12–7	49	W
41	January 6	Anaheim	5–2		Vladar	Xfinity Mobile Arena	19,415	22–12–7	51	W
42	January 8	Toronto	1–2	OT	Vladar	Xfinity Mobile Arena	19,546	22–12–8	52	OTL
43	January 10	Tampa Bay	2–7		Ersson	Xfinity Mobile Arena	19,618	22–13–8	52	L
44	January 12	Tampa Bay	1–5		Vladar	Xfinity Mobile Arena	19,489	22–14–8	52	L
45	January 14	@ Buffalo	2–5		Ersson	KeyBank Center	16,363	22–15–8	52	L
46	January 15	@ Pittsburgh	3–6		Kolosov	PPG Paints Arena	17,963	22–16–8	52	L
47	January 17	NY Rangers	3–6		Ersson	Xfinity Mobile Arena	19,669	22–17–8	52	L
48	January 19	@ Vegas	2–1		Ersson	T-Mobile Arena	17,867	23–17–8	54	W
49	January 21	@ Utah	4–5	OT	Ersson	Delta Center	12,478	23–17–9	55	OTL
50	January 23	@ Colorado	7–3		Ersson	Ball Arena	18,141	24–17–9	57	W
51	January 26	NY Islanders	0–4		Ersson	Xfinity Mobile Arena	17,942	24–18–9	57	L
52	January 28	@ Columbus	3–5		Vladar	Nationwide Arena	15,244	24–19–9	57	L
53	January 29	@ Boston	3–6		Ersson	TD Garden	17,850	24–20–9	57	L
54	January 31	Los Angeles	2–3	OT	Vladar	Xfinity Mobile Arena	19,771	24–20–10	58	OTL

February: 3–1–1 (home: 2–0–1; road: 1–1–0)

Game	Date	Opponent	Score	OT	Decision	Location	Attendance	Record	Points	Recap
55	February 3	Washington	4–2		Vladar	Xfinity Mobile Arena	19,410	25–20–10	60	W
56	February 5	Ottawa	1–2	OT	Vladar	Xfinity Mobile Arena	19,220	25–20–11	61	OTL
57	February 25	@ Washington	1–3		Vladar	Capital One Arena	18,347	25–21–11	61	L
58	February 26	@ NY Rangers	3–2	OT	Ersson	Madison Square Garden	16,867	26–21–11	63	W
59	February 28	Boston	3–1		Vladar	Xfinity Mobile Arena	19,872	27–21–11	65	W

March: 10–4–1 (home: 3–3–1; road: 7–1–0)

Game	Date	Opponent	Score	OT	Decision	Location	Attendance	Record	Points	Recap
60	March 2	@ Toronto	3–2	SO	Vladar	Scotiabank Arena	18,255	28–21–11	67	W
61	March 5	Utah	0–3		Vladar	Xfinity Mobile Arena	19,386	28–22–11	67	L
62	March 7	@ Pittsburgh	4–3	SO	Vladar	PPG Paints Arena	18,342	29–22–11	69	W
63	March 9	NY Rangers	2–6		Vladar	Xfinity Mobile Arena	19,557	29–23–11	69	L
64	March 11	Washington	4–1		Ersson	Xfinity Mobile Arena	19,053	30–23–11	71	W
65	March 12	@ Minnesota	3–2	SO	Vladar	Grand Casino Arena	18,515	31–23–11	73	W
66	March 14	Columbus	1–2	SO	Vladar	Xfinity Mobile Arena	19,645	31–23–12	74	OTL
67	March 18	@ Anaheim	3–2	OT	Vladar	Honda Center	16,214	32–23–12	76	W
68	March 19	@ Los Angeles	4–3	SO	Ersson	Crypto.com Arena	18,145	33–23–12	78	W
69	March 21	@ San Jose	4–1		Vladar	SAP Center	17,435	34–23–12	80	W
70	March 24	Columbus	2–3		Vladar	Xfinity Mobile Arena	19,304	34–24–12	80	L
71	March 26	Chicago	5–1		Ersson	Xfinity Mobile Arena	18,969	35–24–12	82	W
72	March 28	@ Detroit	5–3		Vladar	Little Caesars Arena	19,515	36–24–12	84	W
73	March 29	Dallas	2–1	OT	Ersson	Xfinity Mobile Arena	19,120	37–24–12	86	W
74	March 31	@ Washington	4–6		Vladar	Capital One Arena	18,347	37–25–12	86	L

April: 6–2–0 (home: 3–1–0; road: 3–1–0)

Game	Date	Opponent	Score	OT	Decision	Location	Attendance	Record	Points	Recap
75	April 2	Detroit	2–4		Ersson	Xfinity Mobile Arena	19,865	37–26–12	86	L
76	April 3	@ NY Islanders	4–1		Vladar	UBS Arena	17,255	38–26–12	88	W
77	April 5	Boston	2–1	OT	Vladar	Xfinity Mobile Arena	19,133	39–26–12	90	W
78	April 7	@ New Jersey	5–1		Vladar	Prudential Center	16,514	40–26–12	92	W
79	April 9	@ Detroit	3–6		Vladar	Little Caesars Arena	18,197	40–27–12	92	L
80	April 11	@ Winnipeg	7–1		Vladar	Canada Life Centre	15,225	41–27–12	94	W
81	April 13	Carolina	3–2	SO	Vladar	Xfinity Mobile Arena	19,795	42–27–12	96	W
82	April 14	Montreal	4–2		Ersson	Xfinity Mobile Arena	20,041	43–27–12	98	W

Legend: Win Loss OT/SO loss

=== Playoffs ===
2026 Stanley Cup playoffs
Eastern Conference first round vs. (M2) Pittsburgh Penguins: Philadelphia won 4–2

Game	Date	Opponent	Score	OT	Decision	Location	Attendance	Series	Recap
1	April 18	@ Pittsburgh	3–2		Vladar	PPG Paints Arena	18,346	1–0	W
2	April 20	@ Pittsburgh	3–0		Vladar	PPG Paints Arena	18,308	2–0	W
3	April 22	Pittsburgh	5–2		Vladar	Xfinity Mobile Arena	19,937	3–0	W
4	April 25	Pittsburgh	2–4		Vladar	Xfinity Mobile Arena	20,053	3–1	L
5	April 27	@ Pittsburgh	2–3		Vladar	PPG Paints Arena	18,343	3–2	L
6	April 29	Pittsburgh	1–0	OT	Vladar	Xfinity Mobile Arena	20,005	4–2	W

Eastern Conference second round vs. (M1) Carolina Hurricanes: Carolina won 4–0

Game	Date	Opponent	Score	OT	Decision	Location	Attendance	Series	Recap
1	May 2	@ Carolina	0–3		Vladar	Lenovo Center	18,620	0–1	L
2	May 4	@ Carolina	2–3	OT	Vladar	Lenovo Center	18,647	0–2	L
3	May 7	Carolina	1–4		Vladar	Xfinity Mobile Arena	19,970	0–3	L
4	May 9	Carolina	2–3	OT	Vladar	Xfinity Mobile Arena	19,394	0–4	L

Legend: Win Loss

== Player statistics ==
=== Skaters ===
Stats updated as of May 9, 2026

Regular season
Player	GP	G	A	Pts	+/−	PIM
Travis Konecny	77	27	41	68	14	59
Trevor Zegras	81	26	41	67	0	62
Owen Tippett	81	28	23	51	-6	32
Matvei Michkov	81	20	31	51	0	71
Christian Dvorak	80	18	33	51	11	27
Noah Cates	82	18	29	47	26	44
Travis Sanheim	81	11	26	37	12	20
Sean Couturier	78	12	24	36	-5	30
Jamie Drysdale	79	8	24	32	-3	33
Bobby Brink	55	13	13	26	-5	20
Cam York	74	4	22	26	5	28
Tyson Foerster	29	13	4	17	8	22
Denver Barkey	43	5	12	17	-6	16
Nikita Grebenkin	55	4	10	14	-7	46
Rasmus Ristolainen	44	1	13	14	10	16
Carl Grundstrom	47	9	4	13	7	19
Emil Andrae	60	2	11	13	15	22
Nick Seeler	80	4	6	10	1	38
Porter Martone	9	4	6	10	4	6
Rodrigo Abols	42	3	7	10	-1	22
Noah Juulsen	52	1	9	10	3	15
Alex Bump	17	5	4	9	3	2
Luke Glendening	18	2	3	5	4	4
Garnet Hathaway	66	1	2	3	-6	59
Oliver Bonk	1	1	1	2	1	0
Nicolas Deslauriers	24	0	1	1	-3	33
Egor Zamula	13	0	1	1	4	4
Hunter McDonald	1	0	1	1	3	4
Garrett Wilson	3	0	0	0	0	5
Lane Pederson	5	0	0	0	0	0
Adam Ginning	5	0	0	0	0	0
Jacob Gaucher	4	0	0	0	-1	0
Ty Murchison	3	0	0	0	1	0
Jett Luchanko	4	0	0	0	-3	2
David Jiricek	1	0	0	0	0	2
Anthony Richard	1	0	0	0	0	0

Playoffs
Player	GP	G	A	Pts	+/−	PIM
Trevor Zegras	10	2	4	6	1	26
Porter Martone	10	2	3	5	3	4
Travis Konecny	10	1	4	5	-2	26
Rasmus Ristolainen	10	1	4	5	2	20
Jamie Drysdale	10	2	2	4	-4	10
Noah Cates	8	1	3	4	-2	0
Sean Couturier	10	1	3	4	1	8
Christian Dvorak	10	0	4	4	-1	8
Travis Sanheim	10	2	1	3	2	6
Alex Bump	6	2	0	2	-2	0
Denver Barkey	10	1	1	2	-2	4
Garnet Hathaway	8	1	1	2	3	14
Owen Tippett	6	1	1	2	2	0
Cam York	10	1	1	2	1	6
Noah Juulsen	5	0	2	2	1	0
Tyson Foerster	10	1	0	1	-2	6
Luke Glendening	10	1	0	1	3	6
Nick Seeler	10	1	0	1	1	28
Emil Andrae	4	0	1	1	1	4
Carl Grundström	3	0	1	1	1	2
Matvei Michkov	8	0	1	1	-3	6
Oliver Bonk	1	0	0	0	-1	0
Jett Luchanko	1	0	0	0	0	0

=== Goaltenders ===
Stats updated as of May 9, 2026

Regular season
Player	GP	GS	TOI	W	L	OT	GA	GAA	SA	SV%	SO	G	A	P	PIM
Daniel Vladar	52	51	2,995:13	29	14	7	121	2.42	1,283	.906	0	0	0	0	4
Samuel Ersson	33	29	1,866:35	14	11	5	97	3.12	744	.870	0	0	1	1	2
Aleksei Kolosov	4	2	120:01	0	2	0	8	4.00	47	.830	0	0	0	0	0

Playoffs
Player	GP	GS	TOI	W	L	GA	GAA	SA	SV%	SO	G	A	P	PIM
Daniel Vladar	10	10	633:20	4	6	23	2.18	294	.922	2	0	0	0	2

== Awards and records ==
=== Awards ===
Type	Award/honor	Recipient	Ref
League (in-season)	NHL 3rd Star of the Week (Jan. 26 – Feb. 1)	Travis Konecny	
Team	Barry Ashbee Trophy	Travis Sanheim	
Team	Bobby Clarke Trophy	Daniel Vladar	
Team	Flyers Alumni Community Leadership Award	Garnet Hathaway	
Team	Gene Hart Memorial Award	Travis Sanheim	
Team	Pelle Lindbergh Memorial Trophy	Jamie Drysdale	
Team	Toyota Cup	Trevor Zegras	
Team	Yanick Dupre Memorial Class Guy Award	Daniel Vladar	

=== Milestones ===
Milestone	Player	Date	Ref
First game	Ty Murchison	December 9, 2025	
First game	Denver Barkey	December 20, 2025	
First game	Alex Bump	March 7, 2026	
First game	Porter Martone	March 31, 2026	
First game	Hunter McDonald	April 14, 2026	
First game	Oliver Bonk	April 14, 2026	
1st career NHL point 1st career NHL assist	Nikita Grebenkin	October 12, 2025	
1st career NHL point 1st career NHL assist	Denver Barkey	December 20, 2025	
1st career NHL point 1st career NHL assist	Porter Martone	April 2, 2026	
1st career NHL point 1st career NHL assist	Hunter McDonald	April 14, 2026	
1st career NHL point 1st career NHL assist	Oliver Bonk	April 14, 2026	
1st career NHL point 1st career NHL goal	Alex Bump	March 7, 2026	
1st career NHL goal	Nikita Grebenkin	November 4, 2025	
1st career NHL goal	Denver Barkey	January 3, 2026	
1st career NHL goal	Porter Martone	April 5, 2026	
1st career NHL goal	Oliver Bonk	April 14, 2026	
100th career NHL point	Cam York	March 7, 2026	
100th career NHL point	Matvei Michkov	March 21, 2026	
100th career NHL point	Jamie Drysdale	March 28, 2026	
200th career NHL goal	Travis Konecny	October 28, 2025	
200th career NHL point	Trevor Zegras	November 4, 2025	
100th career NHL goal 200th career NHL point	Owen Tippett	November 29, 2025	
500th career NHL point	Travis Konecny	December 9, 2025	

On November 26, 2025, during a game against the New Jersey Devils, Matvei Michkov and Tyson Foerster set a new franchise record for the fastest three goals scored, scoring three goals in 26 seconds: Michkov scored at 12:06 in the first period, Foerster scored 11 seconds later at 12:15, and Foerster scored again at 12:32. The previous franchise record, 35 seconds, was set in the 1978–79 season by Behn Wilson, Blake Dunlop, and Al Hill.

== Transactions ==
The Flyers have been involved in the following transactions during the 2025–26 season:

Key:

† Contract is entry-level.
‡ Contract initially takes effect in the 2026–27 season.

=== Trades ===
Date	Details		Ref
June 23, 2025	To Anaheim Ducks Ryan Poehling; Columbus' 2nd-round pick in 2025; 4th-round pick in 2026	To Philadelphia Flyers Trevor Zegras	
June 27, 2025	To Pittsburgh Penguins Colorado's 1st-round pick in 2025; Edmonton's 1st-round pick in 2025	To Philadelphia Flyers NY Rangers' 1st-round pick in 2025	
June 28, 2025	To Seattle Kraken 2nd-round pick in 2025; 3rd-round pick in 2025	To Philadelphia Flyers 2nd-round pick in 2025; Toronto's 2nd-round pick in 2025	
September 4, 2025	To Seattle Kraken Jon-Randall Avon	To Philadelphia Flyers Tucker Robertson	
September 14, 2025	To Columbus Blue Jackets Ivan Fedotov	To Philadelphia Flyers 6th-round pick in 2026	
October 5, 2025	To San Jose Sharks Ryan Ellis; Conditional 6th-round pick in 2026 (Note: San Jose will receive the earliest of the two 2026 sixth-round picks the Flyers possessed at the time of the trade, their own or one previously acquired from Columbus.)	To Philadelphia Flyers Carl Grundstrom; Artem Guryev	
October 30, 2025	To Dallas Stars Samu Tuomaala	To Philadelphia Flyers Christian Kyrou	
November 17, 2025	To Ottawa Senators Dennis Gilbert	To Philadelphia Flyers Rights to Maxence Guenette	
December 8, 2025	To Tampa Bay Lightning Ethan Samson	To Philadelphia Flyers Roman Schmidt	
December 31, 2025	To Pittsburgh Penguins Egor Zamula	To Philadelphia Flyers Philip Tomasino	
March 1, 2026	To Minnesota Wild Roman Schmidt	To Philadelphia Flyers Boris Katchouk	
March 6, 2026	To Boston Bruins Alexis Gendron; Massimo Rizzo	To Philadelphia Flyers Brett Harrison; Jackson Edward	
March 6, 2026	To Minnesota Wild Bobby Brink	To Philadelphia Flyers David Jiricek	
March 6, 2026	To Carolina Hurricanes Nicolas Deslauriers	To Philadelphia Flyers Conditional 7th-round pick in 2027	
June 16, 2026	To Toronto Maple Leafs Emil Andrae; Samuel Ersson; 3rd-round pick in 2026	To Philadelphia Flyers Simon Benoit; Joseph Woll	

=== Players acquired ===
Date	Player	Former team	Term	Via	Ref
July 1, 2025	Christian Dvorak	Montreal Canadiens	1-year	Free agency	
July 1, 2025	Dennis Gilbert	Ottawa Senators	1-year	Free agency	
July 1, 2025	Noah Juulsen	Vancouver Canucks	1-year	Free agency	
July 1, 2025	Lane Pederson	Edmonton Oilers	1-year	Free agency	
July 1, 2025	Daniel Vladar	Calgary Flames	2-year	Free agency	
March 5, 2026	Garrett Wilson	Lehigh Valley Phantoms (AHL)	1-year	Free agency	
March 6, 2026	Luke Glendening	New Jersey Devils		Waivers	
March 26, 2026	Riley Thompson	Ohio State University (Big Ten)	1-year†‡	Free agency	

=== Players lost ===
Date	Player	New team	Term	Via	Ref
July 2, 2025	Louie Belpedio	Washington Capitals	2-year	Free agency	
July 2, 2025	Ben Gleason	Minnesota Wild	1-year	Free agency	
July 2, 2025	Olle Lycksell	Ottawa Senators	1-year	Free agency	
July 2, 2025	Jakob Pelletier	Tampa Bay Lightning	3-year	Free agency	
July 2, 2025	Cal Petersen	Minnesota Wild	1-year	Free agency	
July 8, 2025	Rhett Gardner	HC CSKA Moscow (KHL)	2-year	Free agency	
July 14, 2025	Elliot Desnoyers	Iowa Wild (AHL)	1-year	Free agency	
July 15, 2025	Zayde Wisdom	Lehigh Valley Phantoms (AHL)	1-year	Free agency	
October 3, 2025	Givani Smith	Carolina Hurricanes	1-year	Free agency	
May 18, 2026	Anthony Richard	HC Fribourg-Gotteron (NL)	1-year‡	Free agency	
May 26, 2026	Oscar Eklind	Malmo Redhawks (SHL)	4-year‡	Free agency	

=== Signings ===
Date	Player	Term	Ref
July 7, 2025	Cam York	5-year	
November 17, 2025	Maxence Guenette	1-year	
January 5, 2026	Christian Dvorak	5-year‡	
March 11, 2026	Noah Powell	3-year†‡	
March 17, 2026	Cole Knuble	2-year†‡	
March 23, 2026	Alex Ciernik	3-year†‡	
March 29, 2026	Porter Martone	3-year†	
April 1, 2026	David Jiricek	2-year‡	
April 9, 2026	Jack Berglund	3-year†‡	
May 15, 2026	Aleksei Kolosov	1-year‡	
June 1, 2026	Ilya Pautov	3-year†‡	
June 5, 2026	Jacob Gaucher	1-year‡	

== Draft picks ==
Below are the Philadelphia Flyers' selections at the 2025 NHL entry draft, which was held on June 27 and 28, 2025, at the Peacock Theater in Los Angeles.

Round	#	Player	Pos	Nationality	Team (league)
1	6	Porter Martone	Right wing	Canada	Brampton Steelheads (OHL)
1	12 (Note: The New York Rangers' first-round pick went to the Philadelphia Flyers as the result of a trade on June 27, 2025, that sent Colorado's first-round pick in 2025 (22nd overall) and Edmonton's first-round pick in 2025 (31st overall) to Pittsburgh, in exchange for this pick.)	Jack Nesbitt	Center	Canada	Windsor Spitfires (OHL)
2	38 (Note: The Seattle Kraken's second-round pick went to the Flyers as the result of a trade on June 28, 2025, that sent a second and third-round pick both in 2025 (36th and 68th overall) to Seattle in exchange for Toronto's second-round pick in 2025 (57th overall) and this pick.)	Carter Amico	Defense	United States	U.S. NTDP (USHL)
2	40 (Note: The Anaheim Ducks' second-round pick went to the Flyers as the result of a trade on January 8, 2024 that sent Cutter Gauthier to Anaheim in exchange for Jamie Drysdale and this pick.)	Jack Murtagh	Left wing	United States	U.S. NTDP (USHL)
2	48 (Note: The Calgary Flames' second-round pick went to the Flyers as the result of a trade on January 30, 2025, that sent Joel Farabee and Morgan Frost to Calgary in exchange for Andrei Kuzmenko, Jakob Pelletier, a seventh-round pick in 2028 and this pick.)	Shane Vansaghi	Right wing	United States	Michigan State University (B1G)
2	57 (Note: The Toronto Maple Leafs' second-round pick went to the Flyers as the result of a trade on June 28, 2025, that sent a second and third-round pick both in 2025 (36th and 68th overall) to Seattle in exchange for a second-round pick in 2025 (38th overall) and this pick.)	Matthew Gard	Center	Canada	Red Deer Rebels (WHL)
5	132	Max Westergard	Left wing	Finland	Frolunda HC (SHL)
5	157 (Note: The Carolina Hurricanes' fifth-round pick went to the Flyers as the result of a trade on August 9, 2023, that sent David Kase to Carolina in exchange for Massimo Rizzo and this pick.)	Luke Vlooswyk	Defense	Canada	Red Deer Rebels (WHL)
6	164	Nathan Quinn	Center	Canada	Quebec Remparts (QMJHL)
