= Cameron Crotty =

Canadian ice hockey player (born 1999)

- Born: May 5, 1999 (age 27) Ottawa, Ontario, Canada
- Height: 6 ft 3 in (191 cm)
- Weight: 213 lb (97 kg; 15 st 3 lb)
- Position: Defence
- Shoots: Right
- NHL team Former teams: Vancouver Canucks; Sparta Sarpsborg; Arizona Coyotes; Minnesota Wild; Ottawa Senators
- NHL draft: 82nd overall, 2017; Arizona Coyotes
- Playing career: 2020–present

Cameron Crotty (born May 5, 1999) is a Canadian professional ice hockey player who is a defenceman for the Vancouver Canucks of the National Hockey League (NHL). He previously played for the Arizona Coyotes, Minnesota Wild and the Ottawa Senators. He was selected by the Arizona Coyotes in the third round, 82nd overall, of the 2017 NHL entry draft.

== Early life ==
Crotty was born on May 5, 1999 in Ottawa, the son of Son of Suzanne and Gerry Crotty. He played bantam and midget ice hockey in the Upper Canada Cyclones' programs.

== Playing career ==
=== Amateur ===
Crotty played with the Brockville Braves of the Central Canada Hockey League (CCHL) between 2015 and 2017. He won the CCHL Top Prospect Award following the 2016–17 CCHL season. He then joined the Boston University Terriers of the National Collegiate Athletic Association's Hockey East conference. In his freshman season in 2017–18 season, he put up one goal and seven assists for eight points. The Terriers won the Hockey East championship and advanced to the northeast regional final of the Frozen Four tournament where they were knocked out by the Michigan Wolverines. At the end of the season, Crotty was named to Hockey East's All-Academic Team. He returned to Boston University for his sophomore season in 2018–19 and put up five goals and ten points in 38 games. The Terriers were knocked out in the semifinals of the Hockey East championship by the Northeastern Huskies. In his final season with Boston University in 2019–20, Crotty was named one of the team's alternate captains. In 30 games, he registered four goals and nine points before the season was cancelled on March 12, 2020 due to the COVID-19 pandemic.

=== Professional ===
==== Arizona Coyotes ====
Crotty was selected by the Arizona Coyotes of the National Hockey League (NHL) in the third round, 82nd overall, in the 2017 NHL entry draft. Crotty then went to Boston University where he played three seasons, not signing with the Coyotes until April 9, 2020. However, due to the pandemic, a gap opened up from the end of his college career and the beginning of his professional one. In an effort to get game time, Crotty joined Sparta Sarpsborg of Norway's Eliteserien, playing his first game on November 12. He played seven games for Sparta, registering three assists. He returned to North America for the beginning of training camp. Crotty was assigned to the Coyotes' American Hockey League (AHL) affiliate, the Tucson Roadrunners, to begin his professional career. In his first AHL season in 2020–21, he tallied one goal and four points in 32 games. He returned to the AHL for the 2021–22 season and scored four goals and nine points in 68 games in his first full professional season. During the 2022–23 season, Crotty played in 64 games with the Roadrunners, registering 13 points. A restricted free agent at the end of his deal with Arizona, he was not given a qualifying offer and became an unrestricted free agent. However, he re-signed with Arizona on June 30, 2023, to a one-year, two-way contract. He began the 2023–24 season with Tucson but was recalled by Arizona on an emergency basis due to Josh Brown suffering an illness in March 2024. He made his NHL debut for the Coyotes on March 24 in a 5–2 loss to the Dallas Stars. He played in just the one game and finished the season with Tucson, playing in 55 games, scoring three goals and 13 points.

==== Minnesota Wild ====
An unrestricted free agent at the end of the season, Crotty signed a one-year, two-way contract with the Minnesota Wild on July 1, 2024. After going unclaimed on waivers, Crotty was assigned to Minnesota's AHL affiliate, the Iowa Wild, for the 2024–25 season. He was named the team's captain for the season. In 64 games, he tallied ten assists. He was recalled by Minnesota on December 9, but did not play, before being returned to Iowa. He was recalled again on March 23, 2025, but did not see any game time before being returned to the AHL on March 26. He was called up for the third time on April 5 and made his Wild debut on April 12 in a 3–2 overtime victory over the Vancouver Canucks. He was returned to Iowa to finish the season.

==== Ottawa Senators ====
Crotty signed a two-year, two-way contract with his hometown Ottawa Senators on August 25, 2025. He was assigned to Ottawa's AHL affiliate, the Belleville Senators. After spending most of the season with Belleville where he tallied three goals and ten points in 49 games, he was recalled on April 2, 2026, and made his Ottawa debut that night against the Buffalo Sabres. He registered his first NHL point when he assisted on Fabian Zetterlund's third period goal in a 6–2 victory over the Tampa Bay Lightning on April 7. He played in six games with Ottawa, marking the one assists. The Senators made the playoffs and faced the Carolina Hurricanes in the opening round. Crotty made his NHL playoff debut on April 23 in game three of the series, replacing Dennis Gilbert in the lineup. He made the one appearance and the Senators were swept in four games in the first round by the Hurricanes. He began the 2026–27 season on Ottawa's roster and made his season debut early, replacing the injured Jake Sanderson in the lineup against the Boston Bruins on October 5. He made three appearances with Ottawa, going scoreless, before being placed on waivers on October 28.

==== Return to Minnesota, Vancouver Canucks ====
Crotty was claimed by the Minnesota Wild on October 29, 2026. In returning to the Wild, Crotty remained on the roster as a healthy scratch without featuring in a game before he was again placed on waivers and subsequently claimed by the Vancouver Canucks on November 10. He made his debut with the Canucks on November 16 in a 5–1 loss to the New York Rangers.

== Career statistics ==
			Regular season					Playoffs
Season	Team	League	GP	G	A	Pts	PIM	GP	G	A	Pts	PIM
2015–16	Brockville Braves	CCHL	57	3	15	18	38	6	1	6	7	0
2016–17	Brockville Braves	CCHL	41	4	9	13	32	5	1	0	1	2
2017–18	Boston University	HE	34	1	7	8	18	—	—	—	—	—
2018–19	Boston University	HE	38	5	5	10	33	—	—	—	—	—
2019–20	Boston University	HE	30	4	5	9	26	—	—	—	—	—
2020–21	Sparta Sarpsborg	NOR	7	0	3	3	8	—	—	—	—	—
2020–21	Tucson Roadrunners	AHL	32	1	3	4	6	1	0	0	0	0
2021–22	Tucson Roadrunners	AHL	68	4	5	9	30	—	—	—	—	—
2022–23	Tucson Roadrunners	AHL	64	1	12	13	30	3	0	1	1	2
2023–24	Tucson Roadrunners	AHL	55	3	10	13	28	—	—	—	—	—
2023–24	Arizona Coyotes	NHL	1	0	0	0	0	—	—	—	—	—
2024–25	Iowa Wild	AHL	64	0	10	10	56	—	—	—	—	—
2024–25	Minnesota Wild	NHL	1	0	0	0	0	—	—	—	—	—
2025–26	Belleville Senators	AHL	49	3	7	10	29	—	—	—	—	—
2025–26	Ottawa Senators	NHL	6	0	1	1	0	1	0	0	0	0
2026–27	Ottawa Senators	NHL	3	0	0	0	0	—	—	—	—	—
NHL totals			11	0	1	1	0	1	0	0	0	0
