= Leevi Meriläinen =

Finnish ice hockey player (born 2002)

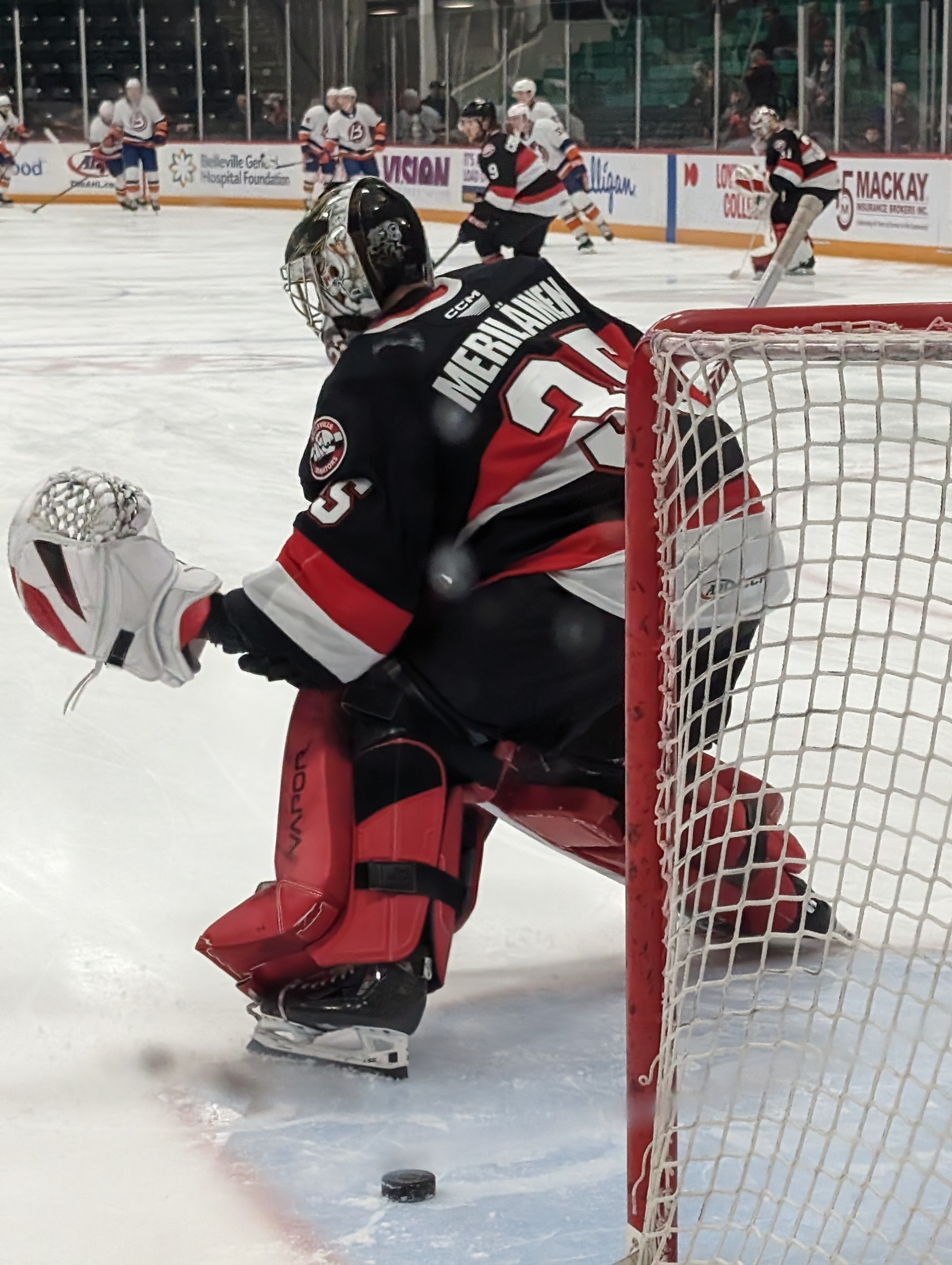
- Meriläinen with the Belleville Senators in 2024
- Born: 13 August 2002 (age 24) Oulu, Finland
- Height: 6 ft 2 in (188 cm)
- Weight: 178 lb (81 kg; 12 st 10 lb)
- Position: Goaltender
- Catches: Left
- NHL team Former teams: Vancouver Canucks; Oulun Kärpät; Ottawa Senators
- NHL draft: 71st overall, 2020; Ottawa Senators
- Playing career: 2022–present

Leevi Meriläinen (born 13 August 2002) is a Finnish professional ice hockey player who is a goaltender for the Vancouver Canucks of the National Hockey League (NHL). Meriläinen previously played with the Oulun Kärpät of the top-tier Finnish Liiga and at the major junior level with the Kingston Frontenacs of the Ontario Hockey League (OHL). He was selected 71st overall in the third round of the 2020 NHL entry draft by the Ottawa Senators, for whom he made his North American professional debut in April 2023.

== Playing career ==
=== Finland and junior ===
Meriläinen joined Oulun Kärpät of Finland's top-tier Liiga as a young player, rising quickly within the team's development ranks. He was with Kärpät's under-20 team playing in 22 games and registering .934 save percentage in the 2020–21 season in Finland. Following his season in Finland, he was selected by the Ottawa Senators of the National Hockey League (NHL) 71st overall in the third round of the 2020 NHL entry draft. He was named a second team All-Star in his junior league, but was told by Kärpät that they intended to seek out a more veteran presence and that Meriläinen would play in the second-tier Finnish league. On 14 June 2021, Meriläinen signed a three-year, entry-level contract with Ottawa.

The Senators asked Meriläinen if he would join the Kingston Frontenacs of the Ontario Hockey League (OHL) for one season. The Frontenacs had selected Meriläinen in the Canadian Hockey League's Import Draft. He agreed and joined the Frontenacs for the 2021–22 OHL season. He experienced mixed results with the Frontenacs becoming one of the league leaders in wins and saves but posting a less than desirable sub-.900 save percentage and a 3.29 goals against average (GAA). Following the conclusion of the OHL season, Meriläinen returned to Finland.

During the 2022–23 Liiga season, Meriläinen rejoined Oulun Kärpät and established himself as the starter, having a terrific year with the team. He posted a 2.02 goals against average and a .918 save percentage while setting the league record for most shutouts by a rookie with eight. However, he was injured towards the end of the season and missed the playoffs where his team was eliminated.

=== Ottawa Senators ===
Following the conclusion of Oulun Kärpät's season, Meriläinen returned to North America to join Ottawa's American Hockey League (AHL) affiliate, the Belleville Senators. He played his first game on 2 April 2023, with Belleville against the Toronto Marlies, posting a 41-save shutout. Following the game he was recalled by Ottawa after goaltender Mads Søgaard fell ill. He played in his first NHL game on 4 April 2023, against the Carolina Hurricanes, posting 34 saves in a 3–2 overtime loss. His play was good enough to earn another start against the Florida Panthers on 6 April. However, neither he nor his replacement in net, Søgaard, played well and Ottawa lost the game 7–2 to the Panthers and were officially eliminated from the playoffs. On 7 April, Meriläinen, along with Ridly Greig, was sent back to Belleville.

Meriläinen was invited to Ottawa's training camp in 2023. However, he did not make the team and was assigned to Ottawa's ECHL affiliate, the Allen Americans, to start the 2023–24 season. Meriläinen was reassigned to Belleville on 28 October. With the return of Søgaard from the NHL, Meriläinen was reassigned to Allen on 29 November. He split the season between Belleville and Allen, playing in 13 games for Allen with a record of 9–4–0 and a .926 save percentage and a 2.97 GAA and 24 games with Belleville, with a record of 10–9–1 with a .906 save percentage and a GAA of 2.87. He made one appearance in the 2024 Calder Cup playoffs, a loss to the Toronto Marlies, stopping 27 of 29 shots he faced and letting in only two goals.

He was assigned to Belleville to start the 2024–25 season. After Ottawa goaltender Anton Forsberg was injured, Meriläinen was called up to NHL on 15 December 2024. Meriläinen started his third NHL game on 21 December, versus the Vancouver Canucks and recorded his first NHL victory. On 11 January 2025, Meriläinen recorded his first NHL shutout in a 5–0 victory against the Pittsburgh Penguins. Days later, after giving up a goal from Alexander Ovechkin in a 1–0 overtime loss to the Washington Capitals, Meriläinen became the 179th unique goaltender to allow a goal from Ovechkin, breaking the NHL record for most unique goaltenders scored against by one player.

On 1 July 2025, Meriläinen signed a one-year, $1.05 million contract extension with Ottawa. He made Ottawa's roster to begin the 2025–26 season as the backup to starter Linus Ullmark. He struggled in the role and when Ullmark left the team in on 29 December for personal reasons, Meriläinen made ten straight starts, doing poorly. This led the Senators to sign veteran goalie James Reimer as a backup and when Ullmark returned in January 2026, Meriläinen was assigned to Belleville. In 20 games with Ottawa, he had a record of 8–10–1 with an 0.860 save percentage and a GAA of 3.51. He spent the rest of the season in the AHL where 19 appearances with a record of 8–8–1, a .909 save percentage and a 2.77 GAA. Meriläinen signed a one-year, $1.1 million extension with the Senators on 2 July 2026.

=== Vancouver Canucks ===
Just under three months later, on 25 September 2026, Meriläinen was waived by Ottawa ahead of the 2026–27 season, and was subsequently claimed by the Vancouver Canucks. He made his debut with the Canucks on 1 October in relief of Kevin Lankinen and stopped 10 of 11 shots in an 9–7 loss to the Edmonton Oilers.

== International play ==
Medal record

Men's ice hockey

Representing Finland

World Junior Championships
Silver medal – second place	2022 Canada	

Meriläinen joined Finland junior team for the 2022 World Junior Championships. Meriläinen began the tournament as Finland's starting goaltender, but was replaced by Juha Jatkola for the semifinal against the Swedish junior team and the gold medal game against the Canadian junior team. Finland lost to Canada in the final game and took silver in the tournament.

== Career statistics ==
=== Regular season and playoffs ===
			Regular season									Playoffs
Season	Team	League	GP	W	L	OT	MIN	GA	SO	GAA	SV%	GP	W	L	MIN	GA	SO	GAA	SV%
2019–20	Oulun Kärpät	Jr. A	16	—	—	—	—	—	—	—	.908	—	—	—	—	—	—	—	—
2020–21	Oulun Kärpät	Jr. A	22	—	—	—	—	—	—	—	.934	5	—	—	—	—	—	2.60	.900
2021–22	Kingston Frontenacs	OHL	53	31	16	5	3,081	169	2	3.29	.891	11	5	5	635	39	0	3.69	.888
2022–23	Oulun Kärpät	Liiga	42	18	13	7	2,228	76	8	2.02	.918	—	—	—	—	—	—	—	—
2022–23	Belleville Senators	AHL	4	3	0	0	204	7	1	2.06	.933	—	—	—	—	—	—	—	—
2022–23	Ottawa Senators	NHL	2	0	1	1	86	6	0	4.23	.878	—	—	—	—	—	—	—	—
2023–24	Allen Americans	ECHL	13	9	4	0	749	37	0	2.97	.926	—	—	—	—	—	—	—	—
2023–24	Belleville Senators	AHL	24	10	9	1	1,298	62	1	2.87	.906	1	0	1	58	2	0	2.09	.931
2024–25	Belleville Senators	AHL	37	18	12	4	2,026	80	4	2.37	.913	—	—	—	—	—	—	—	—
2024–25	Ottawa Senators	NHL	12	8	3	1	663	22	3	1.99	.925	—	—	—	—	—	—	—	—
2025–26	Ottawa Senators	NHL	20	8	10	1	1,094	64	0	3.51	.860	—	—	—	—	—	—	—	—
2025–26	Belleville Senators	AHL	19	8	8	1	1,063	49	2	2.77	.909	—	—	—	—	—	—	—	—
NHL totals			34	16	14	3	1,811	92	3	3.00	.885	—	—	—	—	—	—	—	—

=== International ===
Year	Team	Event	Result	GP	W	L	MIN	GA	SO	GAA	SV%
2022	Finland	WJC	2nd place, silver medalist(s)	4	3	1	244	11	0	2.70	.893
Junior totals				4	3	1	244	11	0	2.70	.893
