= Mads Søgaard =

Danish ice hockey player (born 2000)

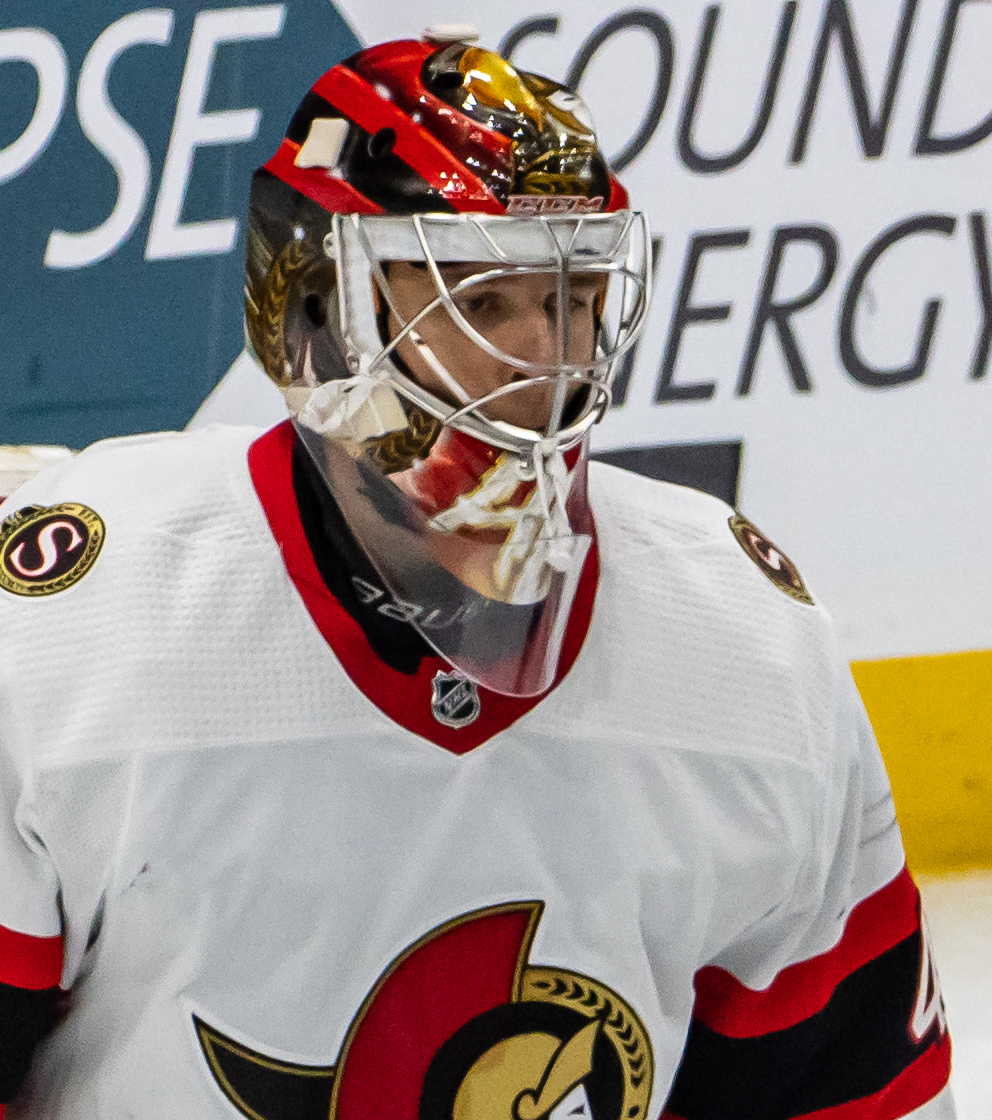
- Søgaard in 2023
- Born: 13 December 2000 (age 25) Aalborg, Denmark
- Height: 6 ft 7 in (201 cm)
- Weight: 231 lb (105 kg; 16 st 7 lb)
- Position: Goaltender
- Catches: Left
- NHL team (P) Cur. team Former teams: Tampa Bay Lightning; Syracuse Crunch (AHL); Esbjerg Energy; Ottawa Senators
- National team: Denmark
- NHL draft: 37th overall, 2019; Ottawa Senators
- Playing career: 2020–present

Mads Søgaard (born 13 December 2000) is a Danish professional ice hockey player who is a goaltender for the Syracuse Crunch of the American Hockey League (AHL) while under contract to the Tampa Bay Lightning of the National Hockey League (NHL). He was selected by the Senators in the second round, 37th overall, in the 2019 NHL entry draft. After two seasons in the AHL, Søgaard made his NHL debut with the Senators in 2022. Internationally, he has played for the Danish national team at the junior level in several tournaments.

== Playing career ==
Søgaard spent his early career in his native Denmark. In 2017 he moved to North America, and spent one season with the Austin Bruins of the North American Hockey League, playing 22 games for them. He was selected 32nd overall in the 2018 CHL Import Draft by the Medicine Hat Tigers of the Western Hockey League (WHL), and joined the team that year. After his first season with Medicine Hat, he was the second-ranked North American-based goaltender, and was drafted by the Ottawa Senators in the second round, 37th overall, in the 2019 NHL entry draft. He briefly played for Esbjerg Energy in the Danish Metal Ligaen due to the COVID-19 pandemic. In his first professional season, he posted a 10–5–1 record with a 2.58 goals-against average (GAA) and a .922 save percentage in 16 games with Energy. He then joined the Senators' American Hockey League (AHL) affiliate, the Belleville Senators in 2020 in the middle of the pandemic-shortened season. Søgaard performed well in his first few games, recording a 7–0–0 record in all of his AHL appearances.

On 13 April 2021, the Senators signed Søgaard to a three-year, entry-level contract. He began the 2021–22 season with Belleville and posted a 16–13–1 record with a 2.87 GAA and a .906 save percentage in 31 games prior to being recalled by Ottawa. Søgaard made his NHL debut for Ottawa on 1 April 2022, in a 5–2 victory over the Detroit Red Wings, also becoming the second Danish goaltender in NHL history after Frederik Andersen. On 1 March 2023, Søgaard was named the NHL Rookie of the Month for games played in February during which he went 4–0–1 with a 2.33 GAA and .922 save percentage. On 10 April, Søgaard and Andersen made NHL history, playing against each other in a game in Ottawa. It was the first time that two Danish goaltenders in the NHL faced each other.

Søgaard attended Ottawa's training camp for the 2023–24 season but was assigned to Belleville to start the season. On 1 November 2023, he was named the AHL Goaltender of the Month for games played in October during which he went 3–1–0 along with a 1.73 GAA and .944 save percentage. Søgaard was recalled by Ottawa on 12 January 2024 after Anton Forsberg suffered a groin injury. He made his NHL season debut in a 7–4 loss to the Colorado Avalanche on 16 January. He picked up his first win of the season on 21 January over the Philadelphia Flyers. After four appearances, Søgaard was sent back to Belleville on 31 January as the NHL went into its all-star break. He was recalled again by Ottawa on 2 March after Forsberg suffered another injury and Joonas Korpisalo was out with an illness. After making two more starts, Søgaard was sent back to Belleville on 7 March. On 14 March, with a win over the Utica Comets, Søgaard broke the Belleville Senators' franchise record for wins in a season, surpassing Filip Gustavsson's previous record of 45.

On 15 July 2024, Søgaard signed a two-year contract with the Senators, a two-way contract in its first year and a one-way contract in the second. He was assigned to Belleville to start the 2024–25 season. He was recalled on 14 October on an emergency basis after Linus Ullmark suffered an injury and made his NHL season debut in relief of Anton Forsberg, making 12 of 16 saves in an 8–7 victory over the Los Angeles Kings that day. He made just the one appearance before being returned to Belleville on 15 October. He made 26 appearances with Belleville with a record of 7–13–4, with a 3.69 GAA and .874 save percentage.

On 1 July 2026, Søgaard left the Senators organization after six seasons, joining the Tampa Bay Lightning on a one-year, two-way contract for the 2026–27 season. He was placed on waivers by the Lightning on 27 September and after going unclaimed, assigned to Tampa Bay's AHL affiliate, the Syracuse Crunch.

== Career statistics ==
=== Regular season and playoffs ===
			Regular season									Playoffs
Season	Team	League	GP	W	L	OTL	MIN	GA	SO	GAA	SV%	GP	W	L	MIN	GA	SO	GAA	SV%
2015–16	Aalborg U20	DEN U20	—	—	—	—	—	—	—	—	—	—	—	—	—	—	—	—	—
2015–16	Aalborg IK	DEN-2	—	—	—	—	—	—	—	—	—	—	—	—	—	—	—	—	—
2016–17	Esbjerg U17	DEN U17	—	—	—	—	—	—	—	—	—	—	—	—	—	—	—	—	—
2016–17	Esbjerg IK	DEN-2	—	—	—	—	—	—	—	—	—	—	—	—	—	—	—	—	—
2017–18	Austin Bruins	NAHL	22	11	6	0	1,137	50	3	2.64	.909	—	—	—	—	—	—	—	—
2018–19	Medicine Hat Tigers	WHL	37	19	8	2	1,981	87	3	2.64	.921	—	—	—	—	—	—	—	—
2019–20	Medicine Hat Tigers	WHL	37	21	13	2	2,115	89	4	2.53	.908	—	—	—	—	—	—	—	—
2020–21	Esbjerg Energy	DEN	16	10	5	1	—	—	—	2.58	.922	—	—	—	—	—	—	—	—
2020–21	Belleville Senators	AHL	7	7	0	0	425	17	0	2.40	.917	—	—	—	—	—	—	—	—
2021–22	Belleville Senators	AHL	35	19	14	1	1,930	92	0	2.86	.908	—	—	—	—	—	—	—	—
2021–22	Ottawa Senators	NHL	2	1	1	0	118	6	0	3.07	.889	—	—	—	—	—	—	—	—
2022–23	Belleville Senators	AHL	22	6	10	2	1,090	63	0	3.47	.893	—	—	—	—	—	—	—	—
2022–23	Ottawa Senators	NHL	19	8	6	3	1,048	58	0	3.32	.889	—	—	—	—	—	—	—	—
2023–24	Belleville Senators	AHL	32	18	9	3	1,864	76	2	2.45	.916	6	3	3	390	16	0	2.46	.910
2023–24	Ottawa Senators	NHL	6	1	3	0	282	19	0	4.05	.859	—	—	—	—	—	—	—	—
2024–25	Belleville Senators	AHL	8	0	5	1	358	22	0	3.69	.858	—	—	—	—	—	—	—	—
2024–25	Ottawa Senators	NHL	2	1	1	0	92	8	0	5.24	.800	—	—	—	—	—	—	—	—
2025–26	Belleville Senators	AHL	27	7	13	4	1413	87	1	3.69	.874	—	—	—	—	—	—	—	—
2025–26	Ottawa Senators	NHL	2	1	0	0	77	6	0	4.65	.833	—	—	—	—	—	—	—	—
NHL totals			31	12	11	3	1,615	97	0	3.60	.877	—	—	—	—	—	—	—	—

=== International ===
Year	Team	Event	Result	GP	W	L	T	MIN	GA	SO	GAA	SV%
2017	Denmark	U18 D1A	3rd	2	1	1	0	120	12	0	3.00	.895
2018	Denmark	U18 D1A	3rd	3	1	2	0	159	29	0	4.52	.793
2019	Denmark	WJC	10th	5	0	5	0	234	24	0	6.16	.805
2019	Denmark	WJC D1A	5th	4	1	3	0	205	11	1	3.22	.600
