= Linus Ullmark =

Swedish ice hockey player (born 1993)

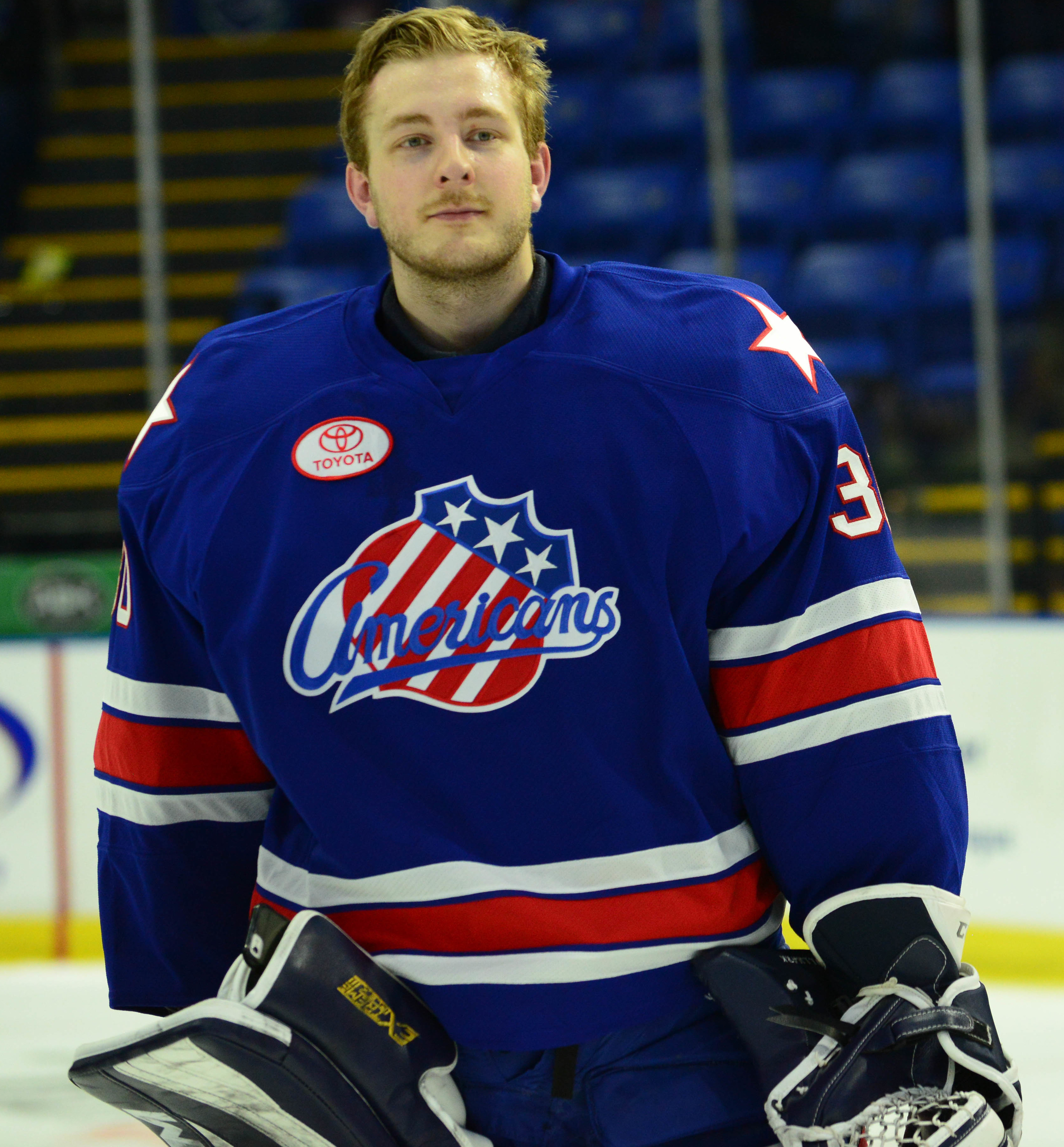
- Ullmark with the Rochester Americans in 2018
- Born: 31 July 1993 (age 33) Kramfors, Sweden
- Height: 6 ft 4 in (193 cm)
- Weight: 212 lb (96 kg; 15 st 2 lb)
- Position: Goaltender
- Catches: Left
- NHL team Former teams: Ottawa Senators; Modo Hockey; Buffalo Sabres; Boston Bruins
- National team: Sweden
- NHL draft: 163rd overall, 2012; Buffalo Sabres
- Playing career: 2012–present

Sven Linus Ullmark (Swedish pronunciation: [ˈliːnus ˈulmɑːrk]; born 31 July 1993) is a Swedish professional ice hockey player who is a goaltender for the Ottawa Senators of the National Hockey League (NHL).

Ullmark was selected by the Buffalo Sabres in the sixth round, 163rd overall, of the 2012 NHL entry draft and made his NHL debut in 2015. With the Boston Bruins during the 2022–23 season, he led the NHL in wins, goals against average, and save percentage, scored an empty net goal, becoming the 13th NHL goaltender to do so, and won both the Vezina Trophy and William M. Jennings Trophy, the latter being shared with his teammate Jeremy Swayman.

== Playing career ==
=== Sweden ===
Ullmark began his junior career assigned to Kramfors-Alliansen of the Swedish J18 Elit League in the 2008–09 season, despite remaining part of Modo's organization. However, when one of the goaltenders assigned to Modo's J20 team left, Ullmark rejoined Modo and appeared in one game in the 2009–10 season. He remained with Modo's J20 team for the 2010–11 season, appearing in two games. He split the 2011–12 season between Modo's J20 team and Modo's senior team in the Swedish Hockey League (SHL), playing 25 games in J20 and 3 games in the SHL. He split the 2012–13 season between Modo's J20 team, playing 25 games, registering a 2.04 goals against average (GAA) and a save percentage 0.924, Mora IK in the HockeyAllsvenskan, playing six games with a GAA of 2.10 and a save percentage of 0.904 and six games with Modo's senior team, with a 2.07 GAA and a 0.934 save percentage. He added five games in the playoffs with Modo's senior team. Ullmark played with Modo's senior team only in 2013–14 season, making 35 appearances, with a record of 17 wins and 16 losses (17–16–0), a GAA of 2.08 and a save percentage of 0.931. For his play that season, he was awarded the Honken Trophy as the league's best goaltender. He returned to Modo for the 2014–15 season playing 35 games, with a record of 12–20–0, a GAA of 3.12 and a save percentage of 0.904.

=== Buffalo Sabres ===
In his first year eligible for the National Hockey League (NHL)'s entry draft in 2011, he was not among those chosen. In the following 2012 NHL entry draft, Ullmark was selected by the Buffalo Sabres in the sixth round, 163rd overall. On 28 May 2014, Ullmark was signed by the Sabres to a three-year, entry-level contract. In his first season in North America, Ullmark attended the Sabres' training camp. After recovery from an early injury, he was assigned to begin the 2015–16 season with the Rochester Americans of the American Hockey League (AHL). Ullmark played in three games before being recalled to the Sabres on 23 October 2015, replacing Nathan Lieuwen, who was sent to Rochester in his place. He made his NHL debut the following day, making 24 saves in a 4–3 defeat to the New Jersey Devils. His first victory came in his second start, a 3–1 win over the Philadelphia Flyers. He appeared in 20 games with Buffalo, with a record of 8–10–2, a GAA of 2.60 and a save percentage of 0.913. In 28 games with Rochester he had a record of 10–16–0, a GAA of 3.41 and a save percentage of 0.902.

Ullmark spent the majority of the subsequent 2016–17 season with the Americans, amassing a record of 26–27–2, a 2.87 GAA and a save percentage of 0.909. He was selected along with teammate Cole Schneider to represent Rochester at the 2017 AHL All-Star Classic. He was recalled multiple times by Buffalo but only saw action at the end of season when he started in the Sabres' final game. The Sabres fell 4–2 to the Tampa Bay Lightning on 9 April 2017, with Ullmark stopping 33 of 37 shots. On 13 June, the Sabres re-signed Ullmark to a two-year, $1.5 million contract. In the 2017–18 season, Ullmark once again spent the majority of the time with Rochester in the AHL, with a record of 21–12–4 in 44 games, a GAA of 2.44 and a save percentage of 0.922. He represented Rochester at the 2018 AHL All-Star Classic alongside teammate C. J. Smith. He was recalled to the Sabres for the first time on 8 January 2018 to replace an injured Robin Lehner. He started his first game of the NHL season on 11 January, earning his only victory in a 3–1 win over the Columbus Blue Jackets. He returned to Rochester after Lehner recovered. He was recalled again in March as the Sabres carried three goaltenders on their, sharing the net with Lehner and Chad Johnson. He appeared in four more games, losing all four of them, before suffering a concussion. He finished his time with Buffalo with a 1–4–0 in five games, a GAA of 2.00 and a save percentage of 0.935. After recovering, Ullmark was sent back to Rochester after they qualified for the 2018 Calder Cup playoffs. However, he fared less well, allowing 16 goals in three games as the Americans were swept by the Syracuse Crunch in their first round, best-of-five series.

Ullmark joined the Sabres full-time during the 2018–19 season after the Sabres let Lehner and Johnson depart as free agents. In his season debut on 13 October, he recorded his first career NHL shutout, stopping all 36 shots faced in a 3–0 win over the Arizona Coyotes. On 22 December, Ullmark stopped all 40 shots faced to shut out the Anaheim Ducks 3–0. Overall, in 37 games, he had a 15–14–5 record, with a GAA of 3.11 and a save percentage of 0.905 while sharing the net with Carter Hutton. On 3 August 2019, the Sabres re-signed Ullmark to a one-year, $1.325 million contract. In the following 2019–20 season, again splitting the netminding duties with Hutton, Ullmark went winless in eleven games before suffering an injury to his right leg in a 5–2 loss to the Ottawa Senators on 28 January 2020. He returned to the lineup after missing 18 games on 9 March in a 3–2 shootout win over the Washington Capitals, marking his final appearance before the NHL suspended the season due to the COVID-19 pandemic on 12 March. He finished the season with a record of 17–14–3, a GAA of 2.69 and a save percentage of 0.915.

With the start of the 2020–21 season delayed by the pandemic, Ullmark signed a one-year, $2.6 million contract with the Sabres on 26 October. Ullmark missed a couple of games into the season due to his father passing. He established himself as the Sabres' starting goaltender until suffering a lower-body injury on 25 February 2021. He missed 15 games before returning on 27 March, with Hutton, Dustin Tokarski and Jonas Johansson sharing the net in his absence. The Sabres lost all of the games he missed, plus three more after his return before Ullmark was in net on 31 March for a 6–1 victory over the Philadelphia Flyers to stop their 18-game losing skid, the longest in the NHL since the 2003–04 season. However, his return was short-lived, after suffering another lower-body injury in his eighth game back on 13 April, missing the remainder of the season. He finished the season with a record of 9–6–3 in 20 appearances, a GAA of 2.63 and a save percentage of 0.917.

=== Boston Bruins ===
On 28 July 2021, Ullmark left the Sabres as a free agent and signed a four-year, $20 million contract to be the starting goaltender with the Boston Bruins. Ullmark played his first regular season game for the Bruins on 22 October, a 4–1 win against the Sabres. Although rookie Jeremy Swayman started the first couple games of the season, Ullmark started most of the games before the Bruins previous starting goaltender Tuukka Rask's returned from injury in November. However, Ullmark retained his position as starting goaltender with Rask as his backup until February 2022, when Rask retired. He recorded his first shutout with the Bruins his final game of the season on 28 April, a 5–0 win over the Sabres. Ullmark finished the season with a record of 26–10–2 in 41 games, with a GAA of 2.45 and a save percentage of 0.917. Ullmark was named as the starting goaltender for the Bruins for their first round, best-of-seven series against the Carolina Hurricanes in the 2022 Stanley Cup playoffs. Ullmark struggled in the first two games, as he let in four goals in both games, both of which were losses. As a result, the team opted to start Swayman in game three, who started the rest of the series. The Bruins were eliminated by Carolina in game seven.

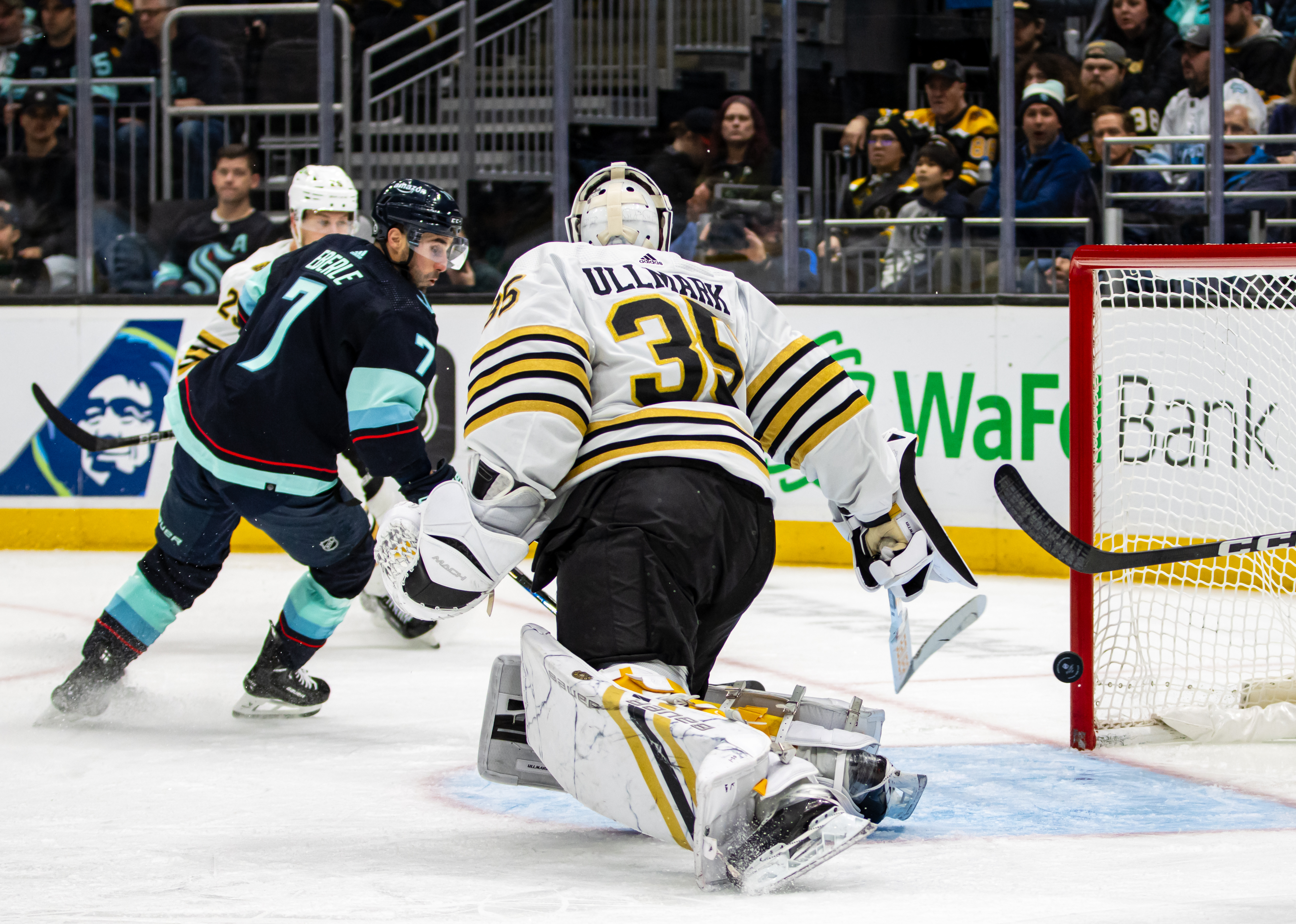
Ullmark with the Boston Bruins during a game against the Seattle Kraken.

The 2022–23 season was a historic one for the Bruins. Ullmark and Swayman's post-victory "goalie hug" embrace became a widely-covered team ritual. Ullmark was named one of three Boston representatives to the 2023 NHL All–Star Weekend, joining head coach Jim Montgomery and teammate David Pastrňák. Ullmark notched his 100th career win on 19 January, saving 25 of 26 shots against the New York Islanders. On 25 February, he became the thirteenth NHL goaltender to score a goal, and the first since Pekka Rinne in 2020, as he shot the puck directly into the Vancouver Canucks' empty net with less than one minute remaining in the Bruins' 3–1 win. The Bruins finished the regular season with new records in both wins (65) and points (135), winning the Presidents' Trophy. Ullmark and Swayman together received the William M. Jennings Trophy as the goaltending tandem to allow the fewest goals against. Ullmark's personal record was 40–6–1 and he led the NHL in GAA (1.89) and save percentage (.938). He was named a finalist for the Vezina Trophy as the league's best goaltender. The Bruins entered the 2023 Stanley Cup playoffs as the favourites for the championship. However, they were ousted in the first round by the Florida Panthers, squandering a 3–1 series lead in the process. Ullmark was ultimately pulled after game six, after he had allowed seven goals in the game. Ullmark defended coach Montgomery, saying "something that everybody does when things aren't going the way they want to is they're trying to find a scapegoat." Ullmark was named an NHL First Team All-Star on 26 June and the winner of the Vezina Trophy on 27 June.

Although Ullmark entered the 2023–24 season as Boston's starting goaltender, Swayman's play saw him get an uptick in starts. As was established in the previous two seasons, however, the two still split relatively even starts, with Ullmark starting 39 games to Swayman's 43. Ullmark finished off the season on a strong note, recording a 1.90 GAA and .935 save percentage in his final nine games after the trade deadline. Faced with a goaltending dilemma, Montgomery started Swayman in the Bruins' first game in the 2024 Stanley Cup playoffs against the Toronto Maple Leafs, and then Ullmark in game two. After game two, the rest of the starts of the series went to Swayman, and the Bruins would beat the Maple Leafs in seven games to advance to the second round. Although Swayman served as the team's starting goaltender for the second round matchup against the Panthers, Ullmark did come into relief for Swayman in game two. The Bruins were eventually eliminated in six games by the Panthers.

=== Ottawa Senators ===
On 24 June 2024, Ullmark was traded to the Ottawa Senators in exchange for forward Mark Kastelic, goaltender Joonas Korpisalo, and a 2024 first-round pick. Just prior to the start of the 2024–25 season, despite still having one year left on his existing deal, Ullmark signed a four-year contract with the Senators on 9 October. He made his Senators debut in the season opening 3–1 victory over the Florida Panthers on 10 October, also recording his first win with Ottawa. He suffered an injury in a game against the Montreal Canadiens on 12 October and missed time, returning on 25 October. On 12 November, he registered his first shutout with Ottawa in a 3–0 win over the Toronto Maple Leafs. He injured his back on 22 December in a 3–1 loss to the Edmonton Oilers. He returned to the lineup on 4 February 2025 after missing 18 games. In 44 games with Ottawa, he had a record of 25–14–3, with four shutouts, a GAA of 2.70 and a save percentage of .910. He was a key component of the Senators return to the playoffs for the first time in eight seasons. He struggled early in the first round matchup with the Maple Leafs, but got better as it went on, recording his first playoff shutout in game five. Ultimately, the Maple Leafs eliminated the Senators in game six. In the six games, Ullmark went 2–2–2, with the one shutout, a GAA of 2.84 and a save percentage of .880.

In his second season with Ottawa in 2025–26, he split the netminding duties with Leevi Meriläinen to start the season. Ullmark struggled through the first half of the season, going 14–8–5, with a 2.95 GAA and a save percentage of .881. On 28 December 2025, Ullmark took a leave of absence from the Senators for personal reasons in order to deal with his mental health. In his absence, first Meriläinen and then other goaltenders failed to cover for Ullmark and the team turned to veteran free agent James Reimer to steady the position. On 25 January 2026, Ullmark returned to the roster as a backup against the Vegas Golden Knights and started on 31 January in a 4–1 win against the New Jersey Devils. After his return, he turned his season around, going 12–4–3 with a GAA of 2.51 and a save percentage of .902. Ullmark's stellar play helped push the Senators back to the playoffs. They faced the Carolina Hurricanes in the first round and despite Ullmark being the best player on the ice, he could not prevent their elimination at the hands of the eventual Stanley Cup champions. In four playoffs games, Ullmark went 0–4–0, with a GAA of 2.03 and a save percentage of 0.932.

Starting the season with a 7-1-0 record, Ullmark was injured in an October 21 game against the Panthers, missing 9 games before returning November 12 against the Colorado Avalanche.

== International play ==
Medal record

Representing Sweden

Men's ice hockey

World Championships
Bronze medal – third place	2014 Minsk	

Ullmark was selected to play for Sweden's national team at the 2014 IIHF World Championship in Minsk, Belarus. He did not play in the tournament, as he was the team's third goaltender behind Anders Nilsson and Joacim Eriksson. He was awarded a bronze medal after Sweden defeated the Czech Republic 3–0 on 25 May 2014 to finish third in the tournament. He returned to the national team for the 2022 IIHF World Championship in Cologne, Germany. He made three appearances for Sweden in the tournament as the team was eliminated in the quarterfinals by Canada.

Ullmark was named to Sweden's team for the 2025 debut of the 4 Nations Face-Off on 4 December 2024. Having just returned to the Senators' lineup due to a back injury, Ullmark was used as Filip Gustavsson's backup for the first two games of the tournament. However, Gustavsson left the second game with an illness and Ullmark entered the game, stopping 15 of 17 shots, as the team fell to Finland 4–3 in the game. Facing elimination, Ullmark was expected to start the final game of the round-robin tournament against the United States, but due to an illness, was replaced with the team's third goaltender, Samuel Ersson. The Swedes won the game, but failed to advance to the final after Canada beat Finland.

Ullmark and Ersson were not named to Team Sweden's 2026 Olympics roster.

== Personal life ==
Ullmark grew up in Lugnvik, a small town in Sweden, with an older brother named Tobias. His father, Jan-Olof played a role in Ullmark's childhood until he suffered a stroke which prevented him from working. After his brother left, his father, due to his health issues, turned to alcoholism. Ullmark opened up that his father's alcoholism had a negative impact on him when growing up and that he thought about quitting hockey. However, he cited his then-girlfriend Moa Wikman, goalie coaches Maciej Szwoch and Magnus Helin, as well as help from Modo's psychiatrist as reasons for persevering. On 18 January 2021, his mother told him that Jan-Olof passed away from complications of diabetes related to alcoholism. Ullmark revealed to TSN that his father's passing made him deal with depression.

Ullmark married Wikman in 2017 and they have a son and daughter.

Ullmark is a fan of esports, and of Dota 2 in particular. On 18 March 2019, he appeared on a Dota 2 podcast where he discussed the differences between playing Dota and ice hockey, as well as comparisons between the professional scenes of competitive gaming and traditional sports.

== Career statistics ==
=== Regular season and playoffs ===
Bold indicates led league

			Regular season									Playoffs
Season	Team	League	GP	W	L	OTL	MIN	GA	SO	GAA	SV%	GP	W	L	MIN	GA	SO	GAA	SV%
2010–11	Modo Hockey	J20	1	1	0	0	60	2	0	2.00	.923	—	—	—	—	—	—	—	—
2011–12	Modo Hockey	J20	25	14	11	0	1,521	70	1	2.76	.918	5	3	1	242	9	1	2.24	.927
2011–12	Modo Hockey	SEL	3	0	2	0	148	8	0	3.24	.890	—	—	—	—	—	—	—	—
2012–13	Modo Hockey	J20	23	18	5	0	1,352	46	2	2.04	.924	5	4	1	250	8	1	1.39	.947
2012–13	Mora IK	Allsv	6	4	2	0	343	12	0	2.10	.904	—	—	—	—	—	—	—	—
2012–13	Modo Hockey	SEL	6	3	1	0	320	11	0	2.07	.934	2	1	1	133	3	0	1.47	.955
2013–14	Modo Hockey	SHL	35	17	16	0	2,043	71	3	2.08	.931	2	0	2	127	9	0	4.24	.899
2014–15	Modo Hockey	SHL	35	12	20	0	1,926	100	1	3.12	.905	—	—	—	—	—	—	—	—
2015–16	Rochester Americans	AHL	28	10	16	0	1,582	90	0	3.41	.902	—	—	—	—	—	—	—	—
2015–16	Buffalo Sabres	NHL	20	8	10	2	1,131	49	0	2.60	.913	—	—	—	—	—	—	—	—
2016–17	Rochester Americans	AHL	55	26	27	2	3,202	153	1	2.87	.909	—	—	—	—	—	—	—	—
2016–17	Buffalo Sabres	NHL	1	0	1	0	59	3	0	3.06	.917	—	—	—	—	—	—	—	—
2017–18	Rochester Americans	AHL	44	21	12	10	2,579	105	2	2.44	.922	3	0	3	175	16	0	5.50	.800
2017–18	Buffalo Sabres	NHL	5	1	2	0	240	8	0	2.00	.935	—	—	—	—	—	—	—	—
2018–19	Buffalo Sabres	NHL	37	15	14	5	2,103	109	2	3.11	.905	—	—	—	—	—	—	—	—
2019–20	Buffalo Sabres	NHL	34	17	14	3	2,027	91	1	2.69	.915	—	—	—	—	—	—	—	—
2020–21	Buffalo Sabres	NHL	20	9	6	3	1,118	49	0	2.63	.917	—	—	—	—	—	—	—	—
2021–22	Boston Bruins	NHL	41	26	10	2	2,331	95	1	2.45	.917	2	0	2	116	8	0	4.16	.860
2022–23	Boston Bruins	NHL	49	**40**	6	1	2,883	91	2	**1.89**	**.938**	6	3	3	360	20	0	3.33	.896
2023–24	Boston Bruins	NHL	40	22	10	7	2,400	103	2	2.57	.915	2	0	1	77	5	0	3.90	.886
2024–25	Ottawa Senators	NHL	44	25	14	3	2,467	111	4	2.70	.910	6	2	4	380	18	1	2.84	.880
2025–26	Ottawa Senators	NHL	49	28	12	8	2,883	131	3	2.73	.891	4	0	4	266	9	0	2.03	.932
SHL totals			79	32	39	0	4,437	190	4	2.56	.922	4	1	3	260	12	0	2.77	.916
NHL totals			340	191	99	34	19,639	840	15	2.57	.914	20	5	14	1,199	51	1	3.00	.896

=== International ===
Year	Team	Event	Result	GP	W	L	OT	MIN	GA	SO	GAA	SV%
2014	Sweden	WC	3rd place, bronze medalist(s)	—	—	—	—	—	—	—	—	—
2022	Sweden	WC	6th	3	1	2	0	186	7	1	2.26	.920
2025	Sweden	4NF	3rd	1	0	1	0	41	2	0	2.88	.882
Senior totals				4	1	3	0	227	9	1	2.38	.913

== Honours and awards ==
Award / honour	Year	Reference
SHL
Honken Trophy	2014	
NHL
NHL All-Star Game	2023	
William M. Jennings Trophy	2023	
Vezina Trophy	2023	
NHL First All-Star Team	2023	
Boston Bruins
Elizabeth Dufresne Trophy	2023	
Bruins Three Stars Awards	2023	

Awards and achievements
Preceded by Frederik Andersen; Antti Raanta	William M. Jennings Trophy; 2022–23; With: Jeremy Swayman	Succeeded by Connor Hellebuyck
Preceded by Igor Shesterkin	Winner of the Vezina Trophy; 2023	Succeeded by Connor Hellebuyck
