= Olle Lycksell =

Swedish ice hockey player (born 1999)

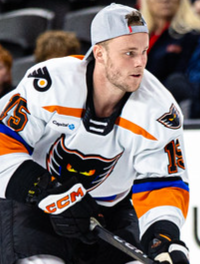
- Lycksell in 2025
- Born: 24 August 1999 (age 26) Oskarshamn, Sweden
- Height: 181 cm (5 ft 11 in)
- Weight: 84 kg (185 lb; 13 st 3 lb)
- Position: Forward
- Shoots: Left
- NL team Former teams: HC Lugano; Linköping HC; Färjestad BK; Växjö Lakers; Philadelphia Flyers; Ottawa Senators
- NHL draft: 168th overall, 2017; Philadelphia Flyers
- Playing career: 2016–present

Olle Lycksell (born 24 August 1999) is a Swedish professional ice hockey player who is a forward for HC Lugano of the Swiss National League. Lycksell was selected by the Philadelphia Flyers of the National Hockey League (NHL) in the sixth round, 168th overall, of the 2017 NHL entry draft. He has also played professionally for Linköping HC, Färjestad BK, and Växjö Lakers in Sweden and the Flyers and the Ottawa Senators of the NHL.

== Playing career ==
=== Sweden ===
Lycksell played as a youth within hometown club, IK Oskarshamn, making his professional debut in the second-tier HockeyAllsvenskan in the 2015–16 season, before moving to continue his development with top tier club, Linköping HC with their junior team. Lycksell continued his junior career with Linköping HC, making his full Swedish Hockey League (SHL) debut during the 2017–18 season, appearing in 26 games, recording five goals and two assists for seven points. He also spent time with IK Oskarshamn, tallying one goal and two points in two games. He split the following 2018–19 season between Linköping HC and their junior affiliate. In 51 appearances with Linköping HC, he scored five goals and 12 points. In his first full SHL season in 2019–20, he saw increased playing time and was among the team's scoring leaders, collecting a career high nine goals and 21 points in 51 games. However, the season was cut short as the SHL cancelled all games beginning 15 March 2020 due to the COVID-19 pandemic.

Lycksell left Linköping HC out of contract and signed a two-year contract with Färjestad BK on 2 April 2020. In his first season with Färjestad in 2020–21, Lycksell matched his previous season output in posting nine goals and 21 points through 46 regular season games. He added one goal and three points in six post-season games.

=== Philadelphia Flyers ===
Lycksell was selected by the Philadelphia Flyers of the National Hockey League (NHL) in the sixth round, 168th overall, of the 2017 NHL entry draft. On 6 May 2021, he was signed by the Philadelphia Flyers to a two-year, entry-level contract. He was loaned by Philadelphia for the 2021–22 season to the Växjö Lakers. With the Lakers he marked 14 goals and 34 points and one goal and four points in six playoff games.

Lycksell began the 2022–23 season with the Flyers, making his NHL debut on 15 October 2022, in a 3–2 victory over the Vancouver Canucks. He was then assigned to Philadelphia's American Hockey League affiliate, the Lehigh Valley Phantoms, on 19 October. He shuttled between Philadelphia and Lehigh Valley for the rest of the season. He recorded his first NHL point on 21 February 2023, assisting on Owen Tippett's second period goal in a 4–2 loss to the Edmonton Oilers. He finished the season with eight appearances for Philadelphia, notching the one assist. In 53 games with Lehigh Valley, he scored 14 goals and 45 points, coming in second in team scoring. The Phantoms qualified for the playoffs and Lycksell scored two goals and four points in three playoff games as the team was knocked out in the first round by the Charlotte Checkers.

A restricted free agent in the offseason, Lycksell signed a two-year, $1.575 million contract with Philadelphia on 13 July. He began the 2023–24 season with Lehigh Valley, earning Player of the Week honours in October. He was recalled by Philadelphia for the first time in December to replace the injured Noah Cates on the roster and made his NHL season debut on 7 December in a 4–2 victory over the Arizona Coyotes, replacing Ryan Poehling in the lineup after Poehling was ill. Bouncing between Philadelphia and Lehigh Valley for the rest of the season, he scored his first NHL goal on 6 April 2024 in a 6–2 loss to the Columbus Blue Jackets. In 18 games with Philadelphia, he scored the one goal and six points and in 38 regular season appearances with the Phantoms, he tallied 19 goals and 39 points, coming in fourth in team scoring. Lehigh Valley qualified for the playoffs and advanced to the second round, where they were eliminated by the Hershey Bears. In six playoff games he marked one goal and four points.

The Flyers assigned Lycksell to Lehigh Valley out of training camp in October 2024 after he cleared waivers. He was recalled for the first time in December and made his NHL season debut on 21 December in a 5–4 overtime victory over the Columbus Blue Jackets. After returning to the AHL, he was selected to represent the Phantoms at the 2025 AHL All-Star Classic. He split the remainder of the season between the AHL and NHL, making 19 appearances with Philadelphia, marking five assists and 44 games with Lehigh Valley, tallying 19 goals and 44 points. The Phantoms made the playoffs and were eliminated from contention by the Hershey Bears in the second round again. In seven playoff games, he added two goals and six points.

=== Ottawa Senators ===
Lycksell signed a one-year, two-way contract with the Ottawa Senators on 1 July 2025. He made the team out of training camp and debuted for Ottawa on 13 October in a 4–1 loss to the Nashville Predators. He was assigned to Ottawa's AHL affiliate, the Belleville Senators, on 17 October. His stay in Belleville was brief, as he was recalled on 21 October and scored his first goal with Ottawa on 23 October in a 2–1 win over his former team, the Philadelphia Flyers. He suffered a concussion in a game on 8 November and remained out of the lineup until 21 November when he was sent down to Belleville after clearing waivers. He was recalled again on 9 December, but did not see much playing time, only getting into a single game on 20 December, in which he assisted on David Perron's third period goal in a 6–3 victory over the Chicago Blackhawks. He was sent back to the AHL on 23 December. He finished the season making seven appearances with Ottawa, scoring once and marking two points. In 44 games with Belleville, he tallied 13 goals and 30 points.

=== HC Lugano ===
In May 2026, it was announced that Lycksell had signed a three-year contract with HC Lugano of the Swiss National League.

== Career statistics ==
			Regular season					Playoffs
Season	Team	League	GP	G	A	Pts	PIM	GP	G	A	Pts	PIM
2015–16	IK Oskarshamn	Allsv	1	0	0	0	0	—	—	—	—	—
2016–17	Linköping HC	J20	29	4	5	9	2	2	1	0	1	2
2017–18	Linköping HC	J20	26	10	12	22	10	—	—	—	—	—
2017–18	Linköping HC	SHL	26	5	2	7	2	—	—	—	—	—
2017–18	IK Oskarshamn	Allsv	2	1	1	2	0	—	—	—	—	—
2018–19	Linköping HC	J20	5	3	4	7	4	6	3	5	8	4
2018–19	Linköping HC	SHL	51	5	7	12	10	—	—	—	—	—
2019–20	Linköping HC	SHL	51	9	12	21	4	—	—	—	—	—
2020–21	Färjestad BK	SHL	46	9	12	21	14	6	1	2	3	0
2021–22	Växjö Lakers	SHL	47	14	20	34	6	4	3	5	8	0
2022–23	Philadelphia Flyers	NHL	8	0	1	1	8	—	—	—	—	—
2022–23	Lehigh Valley Phantoms	AHL	53	14	31	45	6	3	2	2	4	0
2023–24	Lehigh Valley Phantoms	AHL	38	19	20	39	14	6	1	3	4	2
2023–24	Philadelphia Flyers	NHL	18	1	4	5	6	—	—	—	—	—
2024–25	Philadelphia Flyers	NHL	19	0	5	5	2	—	—	—	—	—
2024–25	Lehigh Valley Phantoms	AHL	43	19	25	44	14	7	2	4	6	6
2025–26	Belleville Senators	AHL	44	13	17	30	20	—	—	—	—	—
2025–26	Ottawa Senators	NHL	7	1	1	2	0	—	—	—	—	—
SHL totals			221	42	53	95	36	10	4	7	11	0
NHL totals			52	2	11	13	16	—	—	—	—	—

== Sources ==
- Chaimovitch, Jason, ed. (2025). 2025–2026 American Hockey League Official Guide & Record Book. Springfield, Massachusetts: American Hockey League. OCLC 22147888.
