= Dennis Gilbert (ice hockey) =

American ice hockey player (born 1996)

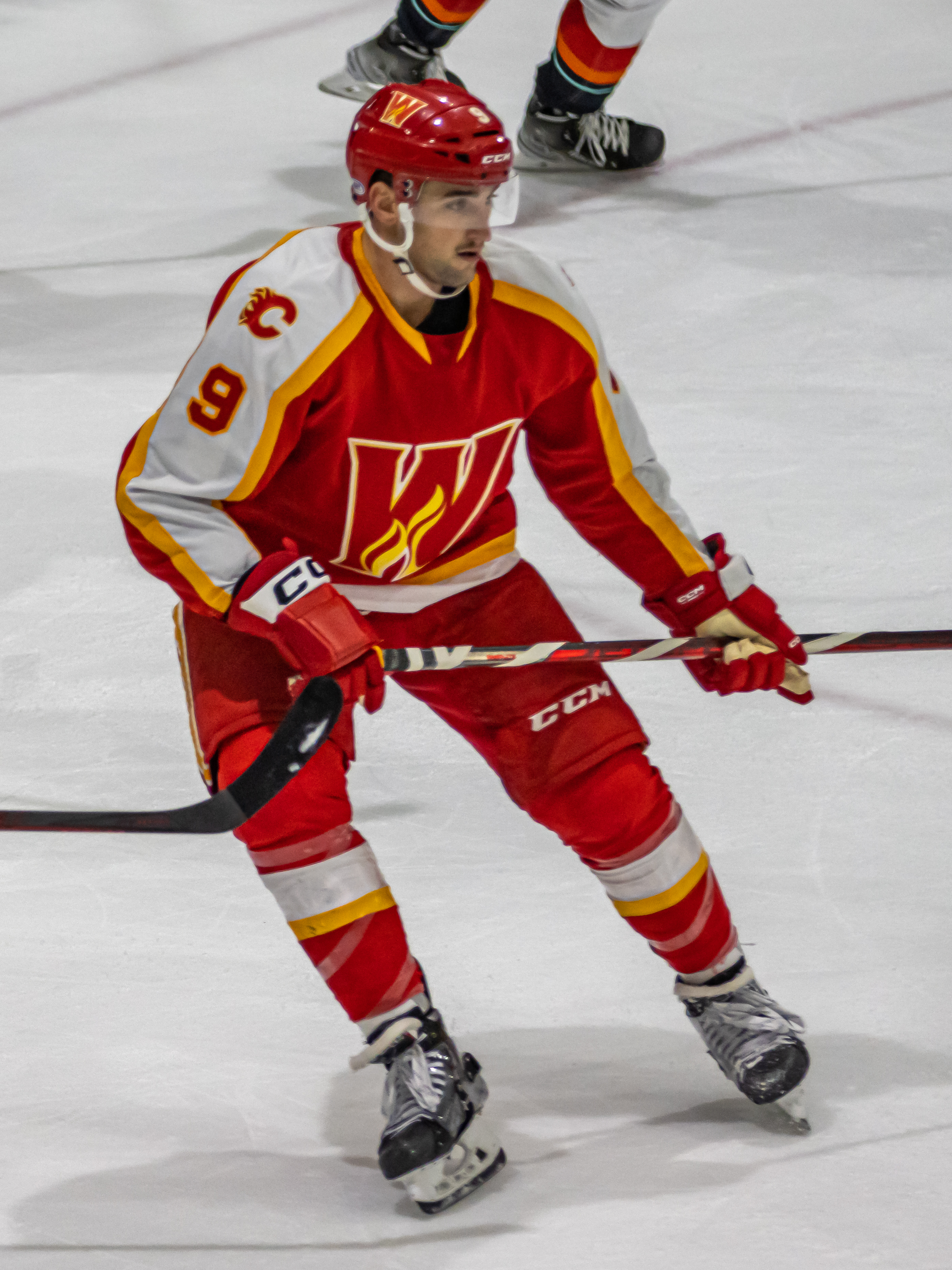
- Gilbert with the Calgary Wranglers in 2022
- Born: October 30, 1996 (age 30) Buffalo, New York, U.S.
- Height: 6 ft 2 in (188 cm)
- Weight: 216 lb (98 kg; 15 st 6 lb)
- Position: Defense
- Shoots: Left
- NHL team (P) Cur. team Former teams: Buffalo Sabres; Rochester Americans (AHL); Chicago Blackhawks; Colorado Avalanche; Calgary Flames; Ottawa Senators
- NHL draft: 91st overall, 2015; Chicago Blackhawks
- Playing career: 2018–present

Dennis Gilbert (born October 30, 1996) is an American professional ice hockey defenseman for the Rochester Americans in the American Hockey League (AHL) while under contract to the Buffalo Sabres of the National Hockey League (NHL). He was selected by the Chicago Blackhawks, 90th overall, in the 2015 NHL entry draft, and has also played for the Colorado Avalanche, Calgary Flames and the Ottawa Senators

== Early life ==
Gilbert was born on October 30, 1996, to parents Dennis Sr. and Kim Gilbert. Growing up, he refused to play hockey year-round to play lacrosse and football. As a sophomore in high school, he was the backup quarterback to Chad Kelly.

== Playing career ==
=== Amateur ===
Gilbert played junior hockey as a defenseman with the Buffalo Jr. Sabres in the Ontario Junior Hockey League before graduating to the Chicago Steel in the United States Hockey League (USHL). In his only season in the USHL in 2014–15, he scored four goals and 23 assists for 27 points in 59 games. While with the Steel, he committed to play college hockey at the University of Notre Dame.

Gilbert joined the Notre Dame Fighting Irish, originally of the Hockey East conference, for the 2015–16 season. In 37 games, he tallied two goals and ten points. The Fighting Irish were knocked out of the 2016 NCAA tournament in the Midwest Regional by the Michigan Wolverines to end their season. In his sophomore season with the Fighting Irish in 2016–17 he made 40 appearances, recording 22 assists. Gilbert helped guide Notre Dame to the Frozen Four, losing to the Denver Pioneers. He was announced as the Hockey East's Best Defensive Defenseman and a Hockey East Third Team All-Star. In July 2017, Notre Dame switched conferences, joining the Big Ten conference. Gilbert concluded his collegiate career following his junior season with the Fighting Irish in 2017–18, in which he played 39 games, marking four goals and ten points. Notre Dame won the Big 10 championship and advanced to the 2018 Frozen Four championship game, where they lost to Minnesota-Duluth Bulldogs.

=== Professional ===
==== Chicago Blackhawks ====
Gilbert was selected by the Chicago Blackhawks of the National Hockey League (NHL) in the third round, 90th overall, of the 2015 NHL entry draft. He turned professional after signing a three-year, entry-level contract with the Blackhawks on April 14, 2018. He was assigned to Chicago's American Hockey League (AHL) affiliate, the Rockford IceHogs, for the 2018–19 season. He made 63 appearances with Rockford, marking five goals and 14 points. At the end of the season, he was recalled by Chicago on April 3, 2019, after the Blackhawks had been eliminated from playoff contention. He made his NHL debut that night in a 4–3 win over the St. Louis Blues. The next day he was sent back to the AHL. He split the 2019–20 season between the AHL and NHL, beginning with Rockford before bouncing between them and Chicago. He recorded his first NHL point on December 12, assisting on Jonathan Toews' second period goal in a 5–2 loss to the Arizona Coyotes. He scored his first NHL goal on December 22 in a 5–2 victory over the New York Islanders. He made 30 appearances with Rockford, scoring one goal and seven points and got into 21 games with Chicago with one goal and three points before the NHL suspended play on March 20, 2020, due to the COVID-19 pandemic.

==== Colorado Avalanche ====
Entering the final year of his entry-level deal on October 10, 2020, Gilbert was traded by the Blackhawks, alongside forward Brandon Saad, to the Colorado Avalanche in exchange for defensemen Anton Lindholm and Nikita Zadorov. He began the pandemic-shortened 2020–21 season on the Avalanche's taxi squad, considered a member of the team's AHL affiliate, the Colorado Eagles, but remained with the NHL team and could be called into NHL action the same day. He made his Avalanche debut on January 19, 2021, replacing Ian Cole in the lineup after the latter was traded to Minnesota earlier in the day. He played in only three games with Colorado having missed four weeks due to facial reconstruction surgery following a fight with Keegan Kolesar on February 16. He was assigned to the AHL on March 16 and made 17 appearances for the Eagles, tallying one goal and eight points. On August 16, 2021, the Avalanche re-signed Gilbert to a one-year contract. Gilbert failed to make the Avalanche's roster and was placed on waivers to start the season. After going unclaimed, he was assigned to the Eagles for the 2021-22 season. In 52 games with the Eagles, he scored six goals and 23 points.

==== Calgary Flames ====
Following two seasons in Colorado, Gilbert left as an unrestricted free agent and was signed to a two-year, $1.525 million contract with the Calgary Flames on July 13, 2022. After going unclaimed on waivers, he was assigned to the Flames' AHL affiliate, the Calgary Wranglers, to start the 2022–23 season. He was recalled by the Flames for the first time on November 6 along with Nick DeSimone. He made his Flames debut on November 8 in a 3–2 loss to the New Jersey Devils. He recorded his first point with the Flames on November 23, assisting on Dillon Dubé's goal in a 2–1 loss to the Pittsburgh Penguins. He spent the season split between the AHL and NHL, performing spot duty with the Flames replacing missing veterans Oliver Kylington and Michael Stone. He tallied his first goal for the Flames on February 11, 2023, in a 7–2 victory over the Buffalo Sabres. In 23 games with the Flames he marked the one goal and four points. In 26 games with the Wranglers he scored two goals and five points.

In his second season with the Flames in 2023–24 season, he made the opening night roster. He steadily got into the lineup until leaving the game on January 4, 2024, due to a head injury suffered after a hit by Philip Tomasino. He was placed on injured reserve on January 17 and did not return to the lineup until March 2, missing ten games. However, during the season, the Flames acquired three new defensemen in March and Gilbert saw his playing time diminish as the new players were integrated. He finished the season with one goal and seven points in 34 games.

==== Buffalo Sabres and Ottawa Senators ====
After his contract with the Flames, Gilbert opted to leave as an unrestricted free agent and was signed to a one-year, $825,000 contract with hometown club, the Buffalo Sabres, on July 1, 2024. He made his Sabres debut in their second game and first win of the 2024–25 season on October 12 in a 5–2 victory over the Florida Panthers. He replaced Sam Lafferty in the lineup. He was scratched for lengthy periods of time, going from November 16 to December 7 without playing a game. He recorded his first point with the Sabres assisting on Tyson Kozak's goal in the first period in a 5–2 loss to the Utah Hockey Club on December 7. With Buffalo, he marked five assists in 25 games.

On March 7, 2025, Gilbert was traded to the Ottawa Senators along with forward Dylan Cozens and a second-round pick in the 2026 NHL entry draft in exchange for forward Josh Norris and defenseman Jacob Bernard-Docker. He made his debut the following night on March 8 in a 4–3 victory over the New York Rangers. He recorded his first point with Ottawa in a 4–3 overtime loss to the Chicago Blackhawks, assisting on Nick Cousins' first period goal. He concluded the season with the Senators, registering one assist through just four appearances.

==== Philadelphia Flyers and return to Senators ====
As a free agent from the Senators, Gilbert was signed as a free agent to a one-year, $875,000 contract with the Philadelphia Flyers on July 1, 2025. He made the 2025–26 Flyers' opening night roster, but never played a game for them before being assigned to the Flyers' AHL affiliate, the Lehigh Valley Phantoms, on October 13. In six games, he recorded one assist with Lehigh Valley. However, just under five weeks later on November 17, Gilbert was traded back to the Senators in exchange for defenseman Maxence Guenette. He was injured during his time in Lehigh Valley in October and was assigned to Ottawa's AHL affiliate, the Belleville Senators, to recover. He was recalled by Ottawa on November 29. He made one appearance with Ottawa, making his NHL season debut on December 4 in a 4–2 loss to the New York Rangers, before was returned to Belleville on December 19. He was recalled again on December 27, but did not see any playing time before being returned to the AHL. He was recalled for a third time on March 9, 2026, after an injury to star defenseman Jake Sanderson. However, Gilbert was injured himself on March 22 and returned to the lineup on April 12. Gilbert finished the season with Ottawa, appearing in eight games, registering one assist. In 31 games with Belleville, he added 12 assists. The Senators made the playoffs and faced the Carolina Hurricanes in the opening round. Gilbert made his NHL playoff debut on April 18 in game one of the series. However, the Senators were swept in the first round by the Hurricanes. Gilbert went scoreless in the three games he appeared in.

==== Return to Buffalo ====
As a free agent at the conclusion of his contract with the Senators, Gilbert left as a free agent and returned to the Buffalo Sabres on a one-year, $850,000 contract for the 2026–27 season on July 1, 2026. Gilbert was placed on waivers by Buffalo on September 25 and went unclaimed. He was assigned to Rochester in the AHL, but was briefly recalled on October 1 after the Sabres lost three defensemen to injury. Though available for the opening night game against the Chicago Blackhawks, he did not see any playing time before being sent back to Rochester on October 2.

== Career statistics ==
			Regular season					Playoffs
Season	Team	League	GP	G	A	Pts	PIM	GP	G	A	Pts	PIM
2011–12	St. Joseph's Collegiate	USHS	27	4	5	9	2	—	—	—	—	—
2012–13	St. Joseph's Collegiate	USHS	28	12	8	20	21	—	—	—	—	—
2013–14	Buffalo Jr. Sabres	OJHL	35	4	13	17	36	10	0	3	3	8
2014–15	Chicago Steel	USHL	59	4	23	27	89	—	—	—	—	—
2015–16	Notre Dame	HE	37	2	8	10	34	—	—	—	—	—
2016–17	Notre Dame	HE	40	0	22	22	22	—	—	—	—	—
2017–18	Notre Dame	B1G	39	4	6	10	16	—	—	—	—	—
2018–19	Rockford IceHogs	AHL	63	5	9	14	67	—	—	—	—	—
2018–19	Chicago Blackhawks	NHL	1	0	0	0	2	—	—	—	—	—
2019–20	Rockford IceHogs	AHL	30	1	6	7	46	—	—	—	—	—
2019–20	Chicago Blackhawks	NHL	21	1	2	3	38	—	—	—	—	—
2020–21	Colorado Avalanche	NHL	3	0	0	0	5	—	—	—	—	—
2020–21	Colorado Eagles	AHL	17	1	7	8	4	—	—	—	—	—
2021–22	Colorado Eagles	AHL	52	6	17	23	41	—	—	—	—	—
2022–23	Calgary Wranglers	AHL	26	2	3	5	41	—	—	—	—	—
2022–23	Calgary Flames	NHL	23	1	3	4	27	—	—	—	—	—
2023–24	Calgary Flames	NHL	34	1	6	7	16	—	—	—	—	—
2024–25	Buffalo Sabres	NHL	25	0	5	5	50	—	—	—	—	—
2024–25	Ottawa Senators	NHL	4	0	1	1	0	—	—	—	—	—
2025–26	Lehigh Valley Phantoms	AHL	6	0	1	1	6	—	—	—	—	—
2025–26	Belleville Senators	AHL	31	0	12	12	27	—	—	—	—	—
2025–26	Ottawa Senators	NHL	8	0	1	1	2	3	0	0	0	6
NHL totals			119	3	18	21	140	3	0	0	0	6

== Awards and honors ==
Award	Year
USHL
All-Rookie Team	2015
College
HE Best Defensive Defenseman	2017
HE Third All-Star Team	2017

Awards and achievements
Preceded by Steven Santini	Hockey East Best Defensive Defenseman; 2016–17	Succeeded by Casey Fitzgerald
