= List of Utah Mammoth award winners =

Utah Mammoth awards

Team trophies
- Award*: Wins

Individual awards
- Award*: Wins

Total
- Awards won: 0

The Utah Mammoth are a professional ice hockey team based in Salt Lake City. They are members of the Pacific Division of the National Hockey League (NHL). They were known as the Utah Hockey Club in 2024–25, their first season in the league.

The Mammoth have not won any whole-team or individual awards. This list does not include any awards from the Arizona Coyotes, as the two franchises are distinct.

== League awards ==
=== Team trophies ===
The Mammoth have not won any of the annual league trophies: the Stanley Cup, Clarence S. Campbell Bowl, or Presidents' Trophy.

=== Individual awards ===
No Mammoth player has won any of the individual awards that the NHL awards annually.

== All-Stars ==
=== NHL First and Second Team All-Stars ===
The NHL First and Second Team All-Stars are players voted the best at their respective position by the Professional Hockey Writers' Association. No Mammoth player has been named to either All-Star Team.

=== NHL All-Rookie Team ===
No Mammoth player has been named to the NHL All-Rookie Team.

=== All-Star Game Selections ===
The NHL All-Star Game is an annual mid-season exhibition game between the league's top players, who are selected by both fan vote and by the league themself. Since the Mammoth have been in the league, there have not been any All-Star games held.

=== All-Star Game replacement events ===
Utah Mammoth players and coaches selected to All-Star Game replacement events
| Event | Year | Name | Position | References |
|---|---|---|---|---|
| 4 Nations Face-Off | 2025 | Olli Määttä (Finland) | Defense | |
| 4 Nations Face-Off | 2025 | Juuso Välimäki (Finland) | Defense | |

== Career achievements ==
=== Retired numbers ===
The Mammoth do not currently have any retired numbers, although Wayne Gretzky's number 99 is out of circulation league wide.

== Team awards ==
=== Team MVP ===
The Team MVP award is given to the player with the most valuable contributions to the team's success, as selected by his teammates.

| Season | Winner |
|---|---|
| 2024-25 | Karel Vejmelka |
| 2025-26 | Clayton Keller |

=== Leading Scorer Award ===
The Leading Scorer Award is given to the team's leading point scorer.

| Season | Winner |
|---|---|
| 2024-25 | Clayton Keller |
| 2025-26 | Clayton Keller |

=== Three-Stars Award ===
The Three-Stars Award is given to the player with the most postgame star honors in the season.

| Season | Winner |
|---|---|
| 2024-25 | Dylan Guenther |
| 2025-26 | Dylan Guenther |

=== Community Obsessed Award ===
The Community Obsessed Award is given to the player who is the most active in the community.

| Season | Winner |
|---|---|
| 2024-25 | Alexander Kerfoot |
| 2025-26 | Michael Carcone |

=== All-In Award ===
The All-In Award is given to the player who "leaves it all on the ice", as selected by the fans.

| Season | Winner |
|---|---|
| 2024-25 | Barrett Hayton |
| 2025-26 | Lawson Crouse |

== See also ==
- List of Arizona Coyotes award winners
- List of NHL awards
