= 2026 Stanley Cup playoffs =

NHL postseason tournament

Tournament details
- Dates: April 18 – June 14, 2026
- Teams: 16
- Defending champions: Florida Panthers (did not qualify)

Final positions
- Champions: Carolina Hurricanes
- Runners-up: Vegas Golden Knights

Tournament statistics
- Scoring leader(s): Mitch Marner (Golden Knights) (29 points)

Awards
- MVP: Jordan Staal (Hurricanes)

The 2026 Stanley Cup playoffs was the playoff tournament of the National Hockey League (NHL) for the 2025–26 season. The playoffs began on April 18, 2026, and concluded on June 14, 2026, with the Carolina Hurricanes winning their second Stanley Cup in franchise history, defeating the Vegas Golden Knights four games to two in the Stanley Cup Final.

The Colorado Avalanche qualified for the playoffs as the Presidents' Trophy winners with the most points (i.e., best record) during the regular season. The Buffalo Sabres ended their NHL-record 14-year playoff drought, clinching a playoff spot for the first time since 2011. The Anaheim Ducks qualified for the playoffs for the first time since 2018, ending their seven-year playoff drought. The Philadelphia Flyers also ended their five-year playoff drought by making the playoffs for the first time since 2020. The Toronto Maple Leafs failed to qualify for the Stanley Cup playoffs for the first time since the 2015–16 season, ending what was the longest playoff streak in the NHL. The longest active playoff streak is now held jointly by the Colorado Avalanche and Tampa Bay Lightning, who have qualified for the playoffs every year since 2018. Additionally, the two-time defending champion Florida Panthers failed to qualify for the playoffs, becoming the first defending champions to fail to qualify since the 2014–15 Los Angeles Kings, and the first two-time defending champions to miss the playoffs since the 1969–70 Montreal Canadiens. The Winnipeg Jets also became the fifth defending Presidents' Trophy winner to fail to qualify for the playoffs. This is also the first time in league history that consecutive defending Presidents' Trophy winners failed to make the playoffs, as the New York Rangers failed to make the 2025 Stanley Cup Playoffs after winning the Presidents’ Trophy in 2024. The Utah Mammoth tied the Seattle Kraken as the second-fastest expansion team to clinch their first playoff berth, doing so in their second season, and for the first time since 1966, none of the New York metropolitan area-based teams (the New Jersey Devils, New York Islanders, and New York Rangers) qualified for the playoffs.

For the first time since 2019, following Tampa Bay's elimination in the first round, neither of the NHL's Florida-based teams made it to the Stanley Cup Final. The Carolina Hurricanes became the first team to have a 12–1 record going into the Final, and the fewest number of losses since the 1975–76 Montreal Canadiens.

The Hurricanes finished the playoffs with a 16–3 record, the fewest amount of losses for a Stanley Cup winner since the 1987–88 Edmonton Oilers.

== Playoff seeds ==
This was the eleventh year in which the top three teams in each division make the playoffs, along with two wild cards in each conference (for a total of eight playoff teams from each conference).

The following teams qualified for the playoffs:

=== Eastern Conference ===
==== Atlantic Division ====
1. Buffalo Sabres, Atlantic Division champions – 109 points
2. Tampa Bay Lightning – 106 points (40 RWs)
3. Montreal Canadiens – 106 points (34 RWs)

==== Metropolitan Division ====
1. Carolina Hurricanes, Metropolitan Division champions, Eastern Conference regular season champions – 113 points
2. Pittsburgh Penguins – 98 points (34 RWs)
3. Philadelphia Flyers – 98 points (27 RWs)

==== Wild Cards ====
1. Boston Bruins – 100 points
2. Ottawa Senators – 99 points

=== Western Conference ===
==== Central Division ====
1. Colorado Avalanche, Central Division champions, Western Conference regular season champions, Presidents' Trophy winners – 121 points
2. Dallas Stars – 112 points
3. Minnesota Wild – 104 points

==== Pacific Division ====
1. Vegas Golden Knights, Pacific Division champions – 95 points
2. Edmonton Oilers – 93 points
3. Anaheim Ducks – 92 points

==== Wild Cards ====
1. Utah Mammoth – 92 points
2. Los Angeles Kings – 90 points

== Playoff bracket ==
In each round, teams competed in a best-of-seven series following a 2–2–1–1–1 format (scores in the bracket indicate the number of games won in each best-of-seven series). The team with home ice advantage plays at home for games one and two (and games five and seven, if necessary), and the other team plays at home for games three and four (and game six, if necessary). The top three teams in each division made the playoffs, along with two wild cards in each conference, for a total of eight teams from each conference.

In the first round, the lower seeded wild card in the conference played against the division winner with the best record while the other wild card played against the other division winner, and both wild cards were de facto #4 seeds. The other series matched the second and third-place teams from the divisions. In the first two rounds, home-ice advantage was awarded to the team with the better seed. Thereafter, it was awarded to the team that had the better regular season record.

First round | Second round
A1 | Buffalo | 4
WC1 | Boston | 2
A1 | Buffalo | 3
A3 | Montreal | 4
A2 | Tampa Bay | 3
A3 | Montreal | 4
Eastern Conference
M1 | Carolina | 4
WC2 | Ottawa | 0
M1 | Carolina | 4
M3 | Philadelphia | 0
M2 | Pittsburgh | 2
M3 | Philadelphia | 4
C1 | Colorado | 4
WC2 | Los Angeles | 0
C1 | Colorado | 4
C3 | Minnesota | 1
C2 | Dallas | 2
C3 | Minnesota | 4
Western Conference
P1 | Vegas | 4
WC1 | Utah | 2
P1 | Vegas | 4
P3 | Anaheim | 2
P2 | Edmonton | 2
P3 | Anaheim | 4

Conference finals
A3 | Montreal | 1
M1 | Carolina | 4
C1 | Colorado | 0
P1 | Vegas | 4

Stanley Cup Final
M1 | Carolina | 4
P1 | Vegas | 2

Legend

- A1, A2, A3 – The first, second, and third place teams from the Atlantic Division, respectively
- M1, M2, M3 – The first, second, and third place teams from the Metropolitan Division, respectively
- C1, C2, C3 – The first, second, and third place teams from the Central Division, respectively
- P1, P2, P3 – The first, second, and third place teams from the Pacific Division, respectively
- WC1, WC2 – The first and second place Wild Card teams, respectively

== First round ==
=== Eastern Conference first round ===
==== (A1) Buffalo Sabres vs. (WC1) Boston Bruins ====
The Buffalo Sabres finished first in the Atlantic Division with 109 points. The Boston Bruins earned 100 points to finish as the first wild card in the Eastern Conference. This was the ninth playoff meeting between these two teams with Boston winning six of the eight previous series. They last met in the 2010 Eastern Conference quarterfinals, which Boston won in six games. The Sabres qualified for the playoffs for the first time since 2011. Boston won three of the four games in the regular season series.

The Sabres defeated the Bruins in six games. Tage Thompson scored two of the four Sabres goals in the third period of game one, coming back from a two-goal deficit to defeat Boston 4–3. In game two, Viktor Arvidsson scored twice for Boston as the Bruins emerged victorious with a 4–2 victory. Alex Lyon made 24 saves in game three, backstopping the Sabres to a 3–1 victory. In game four, Lyon stopped 23 shots as six different players scored for the Sabres, defeating the Bruins 6–1 to take a 3–1 series lead. David Pastrňák kept the Bruins' season alive in game five, scoring the overtime goal to force a sixth game in a 2–1 affair. In game six, Lyon made 25 saves and Tage Thompson assisted twice for the Sabres, sending Buffalo to the second round for the first time since 2007 with a 4–1 triumph.

| April 19 | Boston Bruins | 3–4 | Buffalo Sabres | KeyBank Center | Recap |
| Morgan Geekie (1) – 10:52 | | First period | No scoring |
| No scoring | | Second period | No scoring |
| Elias Lindholm (1) – 01:08; David Pastrnak (1) – pp – 19:52 | | Third period | 12:02 – Tage Thompson (1); 15:44 – Tage Thompson (2); 16:36 – Mattias Samuelsson (1); 18:48 – en – Alex Tuch (1) |
| Jeremy Swayman 34 saves / 37 shots | | Goalie stats | Ukko-Pekka Luukkonen 17 saves / 20 shots |

| April 21 | Boston Bruins | 4–2 | Buffalo Sabres | KeyBank Center | Recap |
| No scoring | | First period | No scoring |
| Viktor Arvidsson (1) – 04:54; Morgan Geekie (2) – 16:29; Pavel Zacha (1) – pp – 18:10 | | Second period | No scoring |
| Viktor Arvidsson (2) – 00:16 | | Third period | 13:54 – Bowen Byram (1); 15:08 – Peyton Krebs (1) |
| Jeremy Swayman 34 saves / 36 shots | | Goalie stats | Ukko-Pekka Luukkonen 15 saves / 19 shots Alex Lyon 7 saves / 7 shots |

| April 23 | Buffalo Sabres | 3–1 | Boston Bruins | TD Garden | Recap |
| No scoring | | First period | No scoring |
| Bowen Byram (2) – 10:58 | | Second period | 02:36 – Tanner Jeannot (1) |
| Alex Tuch (2) – 04:03; Noah Ostlund (2) – en – 18:36 | | Third period | No scoring |
| Alex Lyon 24 saves / 25 shots | | Goalie stats | Jeremy Swayman 27 saves / 29 shots |

| April 26 | Buffalo Sabres | 6–1 | Boston Bruins | TD Garden | Recap |
| Peyton Krebs (2) – 04:17; Josh Doan (1) – 07:10; Zach Benson (1) – 09:15; Bowen Byram (3) – 14:23 | | First period | No scoring |
| No scoring | | Second period | No scoring |
| Beck Malenstyn (1) – 05:08; Alex Tuch (3) – 06:32 | | Third period | 19:20 – sh – Sean Kuraly (1) |
| Alex Lyon 23 saves / 24 shots | | Goalie stats | Jeremy Swayman 23 saves / 29 shots Joonas Korpisalo 6 saves / 6 shots |

| April 28 | Boston Bruins | 2–1 | OT | Buffalo Sabres | KeyBank Center | Recap |
| No scoring | | First period | | 03:35 – pp – Rasmus Dahlin (1) |
| Elias Lindholm (2) – 09:22 | | Second period | | No scoring |
| No scoring | | Third period | | No scoring |
| David Pastrnak (2) – 09:14 | | First overtime period | | No scoring |
| Jeremy Swayman 26 saves / 27 shots | | Goalie stats | | Alex Lyon 27 saves / 29 shots |

| May 1 | Buffalo Sabres | 4–1 | Boston Bruins | TD Garden | Recap |
| Alex Tuch (4) – 03:25; Mattias Samuelsson (2) – 12:26 | | First period | No scoring |
| No scoring | | Second period | 01:54 – David Pastrnak (3) |
| Zach Benson (2) – 05:58; Josh Norris (1) – en – 16:40 | | Third period | No scoring |
| Alex Lyon 25 saves / 26 shots | | Goalie stats | Jeremy Swayman 22 saves / 25 shots |

| Buffalo wins series 4–2 |

==== (A2) Tampa Bay Lightning vs. (A3) Montreal Canadiens ====
The Tampa Bay Lightning finished second in the Atlantic Division with 106 points. The Montreal Canadiens also earned 106 points to finish third in the Atlantic Division as Tampa Bay won the first tie-breaker of regulation wins. This was the fifth playoff meeting between these two teams with Tampa Bay winning three of the four previous series. They last met in the 2021 Stanley Cup Final, which Tampa Bay won in five games. These teams split their four-game regular season series.

The Canadiens defeated the Lightning in seven games, with each game-winning goal scored in the third period or overtime. In addition, each game was decided by one goal, the first time in a seven-game series since 2015 and the third overall. In game one, Juraj Slafkovský's hat trick goal in overtime gave the Canadiens a 4–3 victory. Game two also required overtime in which J. J. Moser scored for Tampa Bay to tie the series 1–1 with a 3–2 victory. In game three, Lane Hutson scored the overtime winner for the Canadiens, giving Montreal a 3–2 victory. Brandon Hagel scored twice in game four, tying the series 2–2 for the Lightning with a 3–2 victory. In game five, Jakub Dobeš made 38 saves for the Canadiens in a 3–2 victory, taking a 3–2 series lead in the process. The Lightning forced a seventh game as Andrei Vasilevskiy stopped all 30 shots he faced and Gage Goncalves scored in overtime in a 1–0 victory. In game seven, Kaiden Guhle assisted twice and Dobeš made 28 saves to send Montreal to the second round with a 2–1 victory. The Canadiens set an NHL record for the fewest shots on goal in a playoff win, registering only nine shots.

| April 19 | Montreal Canadiens | 4–3 | OT | Tampa Bay Lightning | Benchmark International Arena | Recap |
| Josh Anderson (1) – 13:24 | | First period | | No scoring |
| Juraj Slafkovsky (1) – pp – 19:36 | | Second period | | 12:15 – pp – Darren Raddysh (1); 12:44 – Brandon Hagel (1) |
| Juraj Slafkovsky (2) – pp – 05:56 | | Third period | | 08:58 – pp – Brandon Hagel (2) |
| Juraj Slafkovsky (3) – pp – 01:22 | | First overtime period | | No scoring |
| Jakub Dobes 20 saves / 23 shots | | Goalie stats | | Andrei Vasilevskiy 15 saves / 19 shots |

| April 21 | Montreal Canadiens | 2–3 | OT | Tampa Bay Lightning | Benchmark International Arena | Recap |
| Lane Hutson (1) – pp – 16:11 | | First period | | 08:40 – Brandon Hagel (3) |
| Josh Anderson (2) – 18:36 | | Second period | | No scoring |
| No scoring | | Third period | | 12:33 – Nikita Kucherov (1) |
| No scoring | | First overtime period | | 12:48 – J. J. Moser (1) |
| Jakub Dobes 31 saves / 34 shots | | Goalie stats | | Andrei Vasilevskiy 25 saves / 27 shots |

| April 24 | Tampa Bay Lightning | 2–3 | OT | Montreal Canadiens | Bell Centre | Recap |
| Brayden Point (1) – pp – 07:42 | | First period | | 04:53 – Alexandre Texier (1) |
| Brandon Hagel (4) – 04:47 | | Second period | | 12:43 – Kirby Dach (1) |
| No scoring | | Third period | | No scoring |
| No scoring | | First overtime period | | 02:09 – Lane Hutson (2) |
| Andrei Vasilevskiy 26 saves / 29 shots | | Goalie stats | | Jakub Dobes 15 saves / 17 shots |

| April 26 | Tampa Bay Lightning | 3–2 | Montreal Canadiens | Bell Centre | Recap |
| No scoring | | First period | No scoring |
| Jake Guentzel (1) – 19:06 | | Second period | 10:06 – Zachary Bolduc (1); 13:29 – pp – Cole Caufield (1) |
| Brandon Hagel (5) – pp – 01:40; Brandon Hagel (6) – 15:07 | | Third period | No scoring |
| Andrei Vasilevskiy 16 saves / 18 shots | | Goalie stats | Jakub Dobes 17 saves / 20 shots |

| April 29 | Montreal Canadiens | 3–2 | Tampa Bay Lightning | Benchmark International Arena | Recap |
| Brendan Gallagher (1) – 03:00 | | First period | No scoring |
| Kirby Dach (2) – 07:00 | | Second period | 06:49 – Dominic James (1); 17:23 – Jake Guentzel (2) |
| Alexandre Texier (2) – 01:06 | | Third period | No scoring |
| Jakub Dobes 38 saves / 40 shots | | Goalie stats | Andrei Vasilevskiy 21 saves / 24 shots |

| May 1 | Tampa Bay Lightning | 1–0 | OT | Montreal Canadiens | Bell Centre | Recap |
| No scoring | | First period | | No scoring |
| No scoring | | Second period | | No scoring |
| No scoring | | Third period | | No scoring |
| Gage Goncalves (1) – 09:03 | | First overtime period | | No scoring |
| Andrei Vasilevskiy 30 saves / 30 shots | | Goalie stats | | Jakub Dobes 32 saves / 33 shots |

| May 3 | Montreal Canadiens | 2–1 | Tampa Bay Lightning | Benchmark International Arena | Recap |
| Nick Suzuki (1) – 18:39 | | First period | No scoring |
| No scoring | | Second period | 13:27 – pp – Dominic James (2) |
| Alex Newhook (1) – 11:07 | | Third period | No scoring |
| Jakub Dobes 28 saves / 29 shots | | Goalie stats | Andrei Vasilevskiy 7 saves / 9 shots |

| Montreal wins series 4–3 |

==== (M1) Carolina Hurricanes vs. (WC2) Ottawa Senators ====
The Carolina Hurricanes finished first in the Metropolitan Division and Eastern Conference earning 113 points. The Ottawa Senators earned 99 points to finish as the second wild card in the Eastern Conference. This was the first playoff meeting between these two teams. Carolina won two of the three games in the regular season series.

The Hurricanes defeated the Senators in a four-game sweep. In game one, Frederik Andersen stopped all 22 shots he faced, backstopping the Hurricanes to a 2–0 shutout. Game two required overtime, wherein Mark Jankowski originally scored in the first overtime for the Hurricanes. However, the goal was overturned for being offside. Jordan Martinook was then given a penalty shot following the overturn, becoming the fifth player to be given a penalty shot in overtime. He did not score on the penalty shot, but did score in the second overtime. The Hurricanes took a 3–0 series lead after game three with Taylor Hall assisting twice in Carolina's 2–1 victory. In game four, Sebastian Aho scored twice and Logan Stankoven scored in his fourth consecutive game to send the Hurricanes to the second round for the sixth straight season with a 4–2 victory.

| April 18 | Ottawa Senators | 0–2 | Carolina Hurricanes | Lenovo Center | Recap |
| No scoring | | First period | No scoring |
| No scoring | | Second period | 02:11 – Logan Stankoven (1) |
| No scoring | | Third period | 07:15 – Taylor Hall (1) |
| Linus Ullmark 27 saves / 29 shots | | Goalie stats | Frederik Andersen 22 saves / 22 shots |

| April 20 | Ottawa Senators | 2–3 | 2OT | Carolina Hurricanes | Lenovo Center | Recap |
| No scoring | | First period | | 06:31 – pp – Logan Stankoven (2) |
| Drake Batherson (1) – 10:47; Dylan Cozens (1) – 16:40 | | Second period | | 07:50 – Sebastian Aho (1) |
| No scoring | | Third period | | No scoring |
| No scoring | | Second overtime period | | 13:53 – Jordan Martinook (1) |
| Linus Ullmark 46 saves / 49 shots | | Goalie stats | | Frederik Andersen 37 saves / 39 shots |

| April 23 | Carolina Hurricanes | 2–1 | Ottawa Senators | Canadian Tire Centre | Recap |
| Logan Stankoven (3) – 05:13 | | First period | No scoring |
| Jackson Blake (1) – 17:29 | | Second period | 16:06 – Drake Batherson (2) |
| No scoring | | Third period | No scoring |
| Frederik Andersen 21 saves / 22 shots | | Goalie stats | Linus Ullmark 25 saves / 27 shots |

| April 25 | Carolina Hurricanes | 4–2 | Ottawa Senators | Canadian Tire Centre | Recap |
| No scoring | | First period | No scoring |
| Taylor Hall (2) – 15:15 | | Second period | 17:08 – pp – Drake Batherson (3) |
| Logan Stankoven (4) – pp – 09:10; Sebastian Aho (2) – en – 17:38; Sebastien Aho (3) – en – 18:45 | | Third period | 18:11 – Dylan Cozens (2) |
| Frederik Andersen 25 saves / 27 shots | | Goalie stats | Linus Ullmark 26 saves / 28 shots |

| Carolina wins series 4–0 |

==== (M2) Pittsburgh Penguins vs. (M3) Philadelphia Flyers ====
The Pittsburgh Penguins finished second in the Metropolitan Division with 98 points. The Philadelphia Flyers also earned 98 points to finish third in the Metropolitan Division as Pittsburgh won the first tie-breaker of regulation wins. This was the eighth playoff meeting between these two intrastate rivals, with Philadelphia winning four of the seven previous series. They last met in the 2018 Eastern Conference first round, which Pittsburgh won in six games. The Flyers qualified for the playoffs for the first time since 2020. These teams split their four-game regular season series.

The Flyers defeated the Penguins in six games. Porter Martone scored the game-winning goal with 2:37 left in game one to give Philadelphia a 3–2 victory. In game two, Daniel Vladař stopped all 27 shots he faced against the Penguins, helping Philadelphia win 3–0. In game three, Trevor Zegras provided a goal and an assist in the Flyers' 5–2 victory, giving Philadelphia a 3–0 series lead. Pittsburgh avoided elimination in game four as both Sidney Crosby and Rickard Rakell provided a goal and an assist in a 4–2 Penguins victory. The Penguins continued to avoid elimination in game five as Crosby scored and assisted in Pittsburgh's 3–2 triumph. Game six remained scoreless into overtime, where Cam York scored for Philadelphia, advancing the Flyers to the second round.

| April 18 | Philadelphia Flyers | 3–2 | Pittsburgh Penguins | PPG Paints Arena | Recap |
| No scoring | | First period | No scoring |
| Jamie Drysdale (1) – 09:19 | | Second period | 15:51 – Evgeni Malkin (1) |
| Travis Sanheim (1) – 10:00; Porter Martone (1) – 17:23 | | Third period | 18:59 – Bryan Rust (1) |
| Daniel Vladar 15 saves / 17 shots | | Goalie stats | Stuart Skinner 17 saves / 20 shots |

| April 20 | Philadelphia Flyers | 3–0 | Pittsburgh Penguins | PPG Paints Arena | Recap |
| No scoring | | First period | No scoring |
| Porter Martone (2) – 13:39; Garnet Hathaway (1) – sh – 17:43 | | Second period | No scoring |
| Luke Glendening (1) – en – 17:55 | | Third period | No scoring |
| Daniel Vladar 27 saves / 27 shots | | Goalie stats | Stuart Skinner 21 saves / 23 shots |

| April 22 | Pittsburgh Penguins | 2–5 | Philadelphia Flyers | Xfinity Mobile Arena | Recap |
| Evgeni Malkin (2) – pp – 04:18 | | First period | No scoring |
| No scoring | | Second period | 05:18 – pp – Trevor Zegras (1); 09:06 – Rasmus Ristolainen (1); 11:18 – Nick Seeler (1) |
| Erik Karlsson (1) – pp – 09:39 | | Third period | 16:30 – pp – Noah Cates (1); 18:48 – en – Owen Tippett (1) |
| Stuart Skinner 24 saves / 28 shots | | Goalie stats | Daniel Vladar 27 saves / 29 shots |

| April 25 | Pittsburgh Penguins | 4–2 | Philadelphia Flyers | Xfinity Mobile Arena | Recap |
| Sidney Crosby (1) – pp – 14:24 | | First period | No scoring |
| Rickard Rakell (1) – 01:03 | | Second period | 15:40 – Denver Barkey (1) |
| Kris Letang (1) – 04:27; Connor Dewar (1) – en – 19:03 | | Third period | 07:03 – Travis Konecny (1) |
| Arturs Silovs 28 saves / 30 shots | | Goalie stats | Daniel Vladar 17 saves / 20 shots |

| April 27 | Philadelphia Flyers | 2–3 | Pittsburgh Penguins | PPG Paints Arena | Recap |
| No scoring | | First period | 02:45 – Elmer Söderblom (1) |
| Alex Bump (1) – 03:29; Travis Sanheim (2) – 15:03 | | Second period | 03:17 – Connor Dewar (2); 17:12 – Kris Letang (2) |
| No scoring | | Third period | No scoring |
| Daniel Vladar 18 saves / 21 shots | | Goalie stats | Arturs Silovs 18 saves / 20 shots |

| April 29 | Pittsburgh Penguins | 0–1 | OT | Philadelphia Flyers | Xfinity Mobile Arena | Recap |
| No scoring | | First period | | No scoring |
| No scoring | | Second period | | No scoring |
| No scoring | | Third period | | No scoring |
| No scoring | | First overtime period | | 17:32 – Cam York (1) |
| Arturs Silovs 31 saves / 32 shots | | Goalie stats | | Daniel Vladar 42 saves / 42 shots |

| Philadelphia wins series 4–2 |

=== Western Conference first round ===
==== (C1) Colorado Avalanche vs. (WC2) Los Angeles Kings ====
The Colorado Avalanche earned the Presidents' Trophy as the NHL's best regular season team with 121 points. The Los Angeles Kings earned 90 points to finish as the second wild card in the Western Conference. This was the third playoff meeting between these two teams with Colorado winning both previous series. They last met in the 2002 Western Conference quarterfinals, which Colorado won in seven games. Colorado won all three games in the regular season series.

The Avalanche defeated the Kings in a four-game sweep. Scott Wedgewood made 24 saves in game one as the Avalanche defeated the Kings 2–1. Nicolas Roy scored the overtime-winning goal for the Avalanche in game two, defeating the Kings 2–1. In game three, Artturi Lehkonen provided a goal and assist for the Avalanche, taking a 3–0 series lead with a 4–2 victory. In game four, Nathan MacKinnon scored twice and provided an assist in a 5–1 victory, advancing the Avalanche to the second round.

| April 19 | Los Angeles Kings | 1–2 | Colorado Avalanche | Ball Arena | Recap |
| No scoring | | First period | No scoring |
| No scoring | | Second period | 15:29 – Artturi Lehkonen (1) |
| Artemi Panarin (1) – pp – 17:38 | | Third period | 05:50 – Logan O'Connor (1) |
| Anton Forsberg 28 saves / 30 shots | | Goalie stats | Scott Wedgewood 24 saves / 25 shots |

| April 21 | Los Angeles Kings | 1–2 | OT | Colorado Avalanche | Ball Arena | Recap |
| No scoring | | First period | | No scoring |
| No scoring | | Second period | | No scoring |
| Artemi Panarin (2) – pp – 13:04 | | Third period | | 16:25 – Gabriel Landeskog (1) |
| No scoring | | First overtime period | | 07:44 – Nicolas Roy (1) |
| Anton Forsberg 34 saves / 36 shots | | Goalie stats | | Scott Wedgewood 24 saves / 25 shots |

| April 23 | Colorado Avalanche | 4–2 | Los Angeles Kings | Crypto.com Arena | Recap |
| Gabriel Landeskog (2) – 05:29 | | First period | No scoring |
| Cale Makar (1) – 12:12 | | Second period | 05:55 – pp – Trevor Moore (1) |
| Artturi Lehkonen (2) – sh – 07:39; Brock Nelson (1) – en – 17:42 | | Third period | 15:57 – pp – Adrian Kempe (1) |
| Scott Wedgewood 24 saves / 26 shots | | Goalie stats | Anton Forsberg 19 saves / 22 shots |

| April 26 | Colorado Avalanche | 5–1 | Los Angeles Kings | Crypto.com Arena | Recap |
| Nathan MacKinnon (1) – pp – 13:13 | | First period | No scoring |
| Cale Makar (2) – 05:48 | | Second period | 13:43 – Joel Edmundson (1) |
| Nicolas Roy (2) – 03:13; Devon Toews (1) – 06:01; Nathan MacKinnon (2) – en – 14:22 | | Third period | No scoring |
| Scott Wedgewood 24 saves / 25 shots | | Goalie stats | Anton Forsberg 27 saves / 31 shots |

| Colorado wins series 4–0 |

==== (C2) Dallas Stars vs. (C3) Minnesota Wild ====
The Dallas Stars finished second in the Central Division with 112 points. The Minnesota Wild earned 104 points to finish third in the Central. This was the third playoff meeting between these two teams with Dallas winning both previous series. They last met in the 2023 Western Conference first round, which Dallas won in six games. These teams split their four games in the regular season.

The Wild defeated the Stars in six games. Joel Eriksson Ek and Matt Boldy both scored twice and provided an assist in Minnesota's 6–1 rout of game one. In game two, Wyatt Johnston scored twice for the Stars, who tied the series 1–1 with a 4–2 victory. Game three required double overtime, where Johnston scored for the Stars in a 4–3 victory. Game four also required overtime; this time Boldy scored for the Wild, tying the series with a 3–2 triumph. Kirill Kaprizov scored and provided two assists for the Wild in game five, giving the Wild a 3–2 series lead with a 4–2 win. Quinn Hughes and Matt Boldy both scored two goals for the Wild in game six, advancing Minnesota with a 5–2 victory to the second round for the first time since 2015.

| April 18 | Minnesota Wild | 6–1 | Dallas Stars | American Airlines Center | Recap |
| Joel Eriksson Ek (1) – pp – 05:35 | | First period | No scoring |
| Kirill Kaprizov (1) – 00:56; Ryan Hartman (1) – 03:28; Matt Boldy (1) – 06:30 | | Second period | 15:10 – pp – Jason Robertson (1) |
| Joel Eriksson Ek (2) – pp – 08:13; Matt Boldy (2) – en – 16:52 | | Third period | No scoring |
| Jesper Wallstedt 27 saves / 28 shots | | Goalie stats | Jake Oettinger 23 saves / 28 shots |

| April 20 | Minnesota Wild | 2–4 | Dallas Stars | American Airlines Center | Recap |
| Brock Faber (1) – 11:33 | | First period | 08:58 – Wyatt Johnston (1) |
| No scoring | | Second period | 04:02 – pp – Matt Duchene (1) |
| Brock Faber (2) – 09:47 | | Third period | 07:09 – Jason Robertson (2); 19:10 – pp-en – Wyatt Johnston (2) |
| Jesper Wallstedt 28 saves / 31 shots | | Goalie stats | Jake Oettinger 28 saves / 30 shots |

| April 22 | Dallas Stars | 4–3 | 2OT | Minnesota Wild | Grand Casino Arena | Recap |
| Mikko Rantanen (1) – pp – 01:25; Jason Robertson (3) – 13:48 | | First period | | 18:20 – Marcus Johansson (1) |
| No scoring | | Second period | | 05:00 – Joel Eriksson Ek (3); 17:25 – Michael McCarron (1) |
| Matt Duchene (2) – pp – 10:18 | | Third period | | No scoring |
| Wyatt Johnston (3) – pp – 12:08 | | Second overtime period | | No scoring |
| Jake Oettinger 28 saves / 31 shots | | Goalie stats | | Jesper Wallstedt 32 saves / 36 shots |

| April 25 | Dallas Stars | 2–3 | OT | Minnesota Wild | Grand Casino Arena | Recap |
| Jason Robertson (4) – pp – 12:08 | | First period | | 13:52 – Brock Faber (3) |
| Miro Heiskanen (1) – pp – 19:25 | | Second period | | No scoring |
| No scoring | | Third period | | 14:40 – Marcus Foligno (1) |
| No scoring | | First overtime period | | 19:29 – Matt Boldy (3) |
| Jake Oettinger 40 saves / 43 shots | | Goalie stats | | Jesper Wallstedt 43 saves / 45 shots |

| April 28 | Minnesota Wild | 4–2 | Dallas Stars | American Airlines Center | Recap |
| Mats Zuccarello (1) – 03:51 | | First period | 08:58 – pp – Miro Heiskanen (2) |
| Matt Boldy (4) – pp – 19:28 | | Second period | No scoring |
| Michael McCarron (2) – 07:47; Kirill Kaprizov (2) – 18:00 | | Third period | 16:39 – Jason Robertson (5) |
| Jesper Wallstedt 20 saves / 22 shots | | Goalie stats | Jake Oettinger 24 saves / 28 shots |

| April 30 | Dallas Stars | 2–5 | Minnesota Wild | Grand Casino Arena | Recap |
| No scoring | | First period | 06:23 – Quinn Hughes (1) |
| Wyatt Johnston (4) – pp – 07:01; Mavrik Bourque (1) – 16:08 | | Second period | 17:00 – Vladimir Tarasenko (1) |
| No scoring | | Third period | 10:38 – Quinn Hughes (2); 18:29 – en – Matt Boldy (5); 19:45 – en – Matt Boldy (6) |
| Jake Oettinger 16 saves / 19 shots | | Goalie stats | Jesper Wallstedt 21 saves / 23 shots |

| Minnesota wins series 4–2 |

==== (P1) Vegas Golden Knights vs. (WC1) Utah Mammoth ====
The Vegas Golden Knights finished first in the Pacific Division with 95 points. The Utah Mammoth earned 92 points to finish as the first wild card in the Western Conference. This is the first playoff meeting between these two teams and the first playoff series for the Mammoth. Utah won two of the three games in the regular season series.

The Golden Knights defeated the Mammoth in six games. In game one, Carter Hart made 31 saves for the Golden Knights, who defeated the Mammoth 4–2. Kailer Yamamoto provided two assists in Utah's 3–2 victory in game two, tying the series 1–1 and giving the Mammoth their first playoff victory. In game three, Lawson Crouse scored twice giving Utah their first home playoff victory with a 4–2 triumph. In game four, Jack Eichel's goal for Vegas was overturned in overtime due to an offside call. However, the Golden Knights tied the series 2–2 on Shea Theodore's overtime goal, earned in a 5–4 victory. Game five also required overtime, which favored Vegas as Brett Howden scored shorthanded to give the Golden Knights a 3–2 series lead with a 5–4 win. In game six, Mitch Marner scored twice for Vegas as the Golden Knights defeated the Mammoth 5–1 to advance to the second round.

| April 19 | Utah Mammoth | 2–4 | Vegas Golden Knights | T-Mobile Arena | Recap |
| Logan Cooley (1) – 19:49 | | First period | No scoring |
| Kevin Stenlund (1) – 05:07 | | Second period | 03:44 – Colton Sissons (1) |
| No scoring | | Third period | 05:33 – pp – Mark Stone (1); 07:20 – Nic Dowd (1); 18:21 – en – Ivan Barbashev (1) |
| Karel Vejmelka 27 saves / 30 shots | | Goalie stats | Carter Hart 31 saves / 33 shots |

| April 21 | Utah Mammoth | 3–2 | Vegas Golden Knights | T-Mobile Arena | Recap |
| MacKenzie Weegar (1) – own – 16:59 | | First period | 11:42 – pp – Mark Stone (2) |
| Dylan Guenther (1) – 14:56 | | Second period | 15:58 – Ivan Barbashev (2) |
| Logan Cooley (2) – 14:00 | | Third period | No scoring |
| Karel Vejmelka 19 saves / 21 shots | | Goalie stats | Carter Hart 27 saves / 29 shots |

| April 24 | Vegas Golden Knights | 2–4 | Utah Mammoth | Delta Center | Recap |
| No scoring | | First period | 12:59 – MacKenzie Weegar (2); 17:45 – pp – Dylan Guenther (2) |
| Jack Eichel (1) – 13:20 | | Second period | 04:06 – Lawson Crouse (1); 09:48 – Lawson Crouse (2) |
| Nic Dowd (2) – 16:52 | | Third period | No scoring |
| Carter Hart 8 saves / 12 shots | | Goalie stats | Karel Vejmelka 30 saves / 32 shots |

| April 27 | Vegas Golden Knights | 5–4 | OT | Utah Mammoth | Delta Center | Recap |
| Pavel Dorofeyev (1) – 01:12; Brett Howden (1) – sh – 18:38 | | First period | | No scoring |
| Cole Smith – 03:26 | | Second period | | 08:04 – Nick Schmaltz (1); 08:33 – Ian Cole (1) |
| Brett Howden (2) – 10:25 | | Third period | | 01:45 – Michael Carcone (1); 05:10 – Clayton Keller (1) |
| Shea Theodore (1) – 19:08 | | First overtime period | | No scoring |
| Carter Hart 27 saves / 31 shots | | Goalie stats | | Karel Vejmelka 31 saves / 36 shots |

| April 29 | Utah Mammoth | 4–5 | 2OT | Vegas Golden Knights | T-Mobile Arena | Recap |
| John Marino (1) – 17:11 | | First period | | 19:19 – pp – Pavel Dorofeyev (2) |
| Lawson Crouse (3) – 10:40 | | Second period | | 15:37 – Pavel Dorofeyev (3); 17:17 – Shea Theodore (2) |
| Dylan Guenther (3) – 05:54; Michael Carcone (2) – 12:42 | | Third period | | 19:47 – Pavel Dorofeyev (4) |
| No scoring | | Second overtime period | | 05:28 – sh – Brett Howden (3) |
| Karel Vejmelka 31 saves / 36 shots | | Goalie stats | | Carter Hart 34 saves / 38 shots |

| May 1 | Vegas Golden Knights | 5–1 | Utah Mammoth | Delta Center | Recap |
| Brett Howden (4) – 15:02 | | First period | No scoring |
| Mitch Marner (1) – 19:15 | | Second period | No scoring |
| Colton Sissons (2) – 09:39; Mitch Marner (2) – pp – 12:09; Cole Smith (2) – en – 16:24 | | Third period | 07:41 – Kailer Yamamoto (1) |
| Carter Hart 22 saves / 23 shots | | Goalie stats | Karel Vejmelka 21 saves / 26 shots |

| Vegas wins series 4–2 |

==== (P2) Edmonton Oilers vs. (P3) Anaheim Ducks ====
The Edmonton Oilers finished second in the Pacific Division with 93 points. The Anaheim Ducks earned 92 points to finish third in the Pacific. This was the third playoff meeting between these two teams with both teams splitting the two previous series. They last met in the 2017 Western Conference second round, which Anaheim won in seven games. The Ducks qualified for the playoffs for the first time since 2018. Edmonton won two of the three games in the regular season series.

The Ducks defeated the Oilers in six games. Kasperi Kapanen spoiled the Ducks' comeback in game one, scoring with 1:54 left in the game to make it 4–3 for the Oilers. In game two, Jackson LaCombe provided three assists for the Ducks, defeating the Oilers 6–4. Mikael Granlund scored a goal and assisted thrice in game three, giving the Ducks a 7–4 victory. In game four, the Ducks came back from a two-goal deficit to force overtime. In overtime, Ryan Poehling initially scored the winning goal, but a controversial call on the goal required video review to confirm whether the puck had crossed the goal line. After the video review, Poehling's goal stood and the Ducks took a 3–1 series lead with a 4–3 victory. The Oilers avoided in elimination in game five as Leon Draisaitl scored twice in a 4–1 affair.Troy Terry and Chris Kreider provided a goal and two assists in game six, giving Anaheim a 5–2 victory and its first playoff series win since 2017.

| April 20 | Anaheim Ducks | 3–4 | Edmonton Oilers | Rogers Place | Recap |
| No scoring | | First period | 17:21 – Jason Dickinson (1); 18:21 – Kasperi Kapanen (1) |
| Troy Terry (1) – 00:19; Leo Carlsson (1) – 04:38; Troy Terry (2) – pp – 14:29 | | Second period | No scoring |
| No scoring | | Third period | 11:30 – Jason Dickinson (2); 18:06 – Kasperi Kapanen (2) |
| Lukas Dostal 30 saves / 34 shots | | Goalie stats | Connor Ingram 25 saves / 28 shots |

| April 22 | Anaheim Ducks | 6–4 | Edmonton Oilers | Rogers Place | Recap |
| Cutter Gauthier (1) – pp – 12:48 | | First period | 08:58 – Leon Draisaitl (1) |
| Jacob Trouba (1) – 02:44; Alex Killorn (1) – pp – 05:35; Ryan Poehling (1) – sh – 15:50 | | Second period | 11:46 – Connor Murphy (1); 17:48 – Zach Hyman (1) |
| Cutter Gauthier (2) – 15:08; Ryan Poehling (2) – en – 18:50 | | Third period | 13:51 – Josh Samanski (1) |
| Lukas Dostal 33 saves / 37 shots | | Goalie stats | Connor Ingram 22 saves / 27 shots |

| April 24 | Edmonton Oilers | 4–7 | Anaheim Ducks | Honda Center | Recap |
| Vasily Podkolzin (1) – 13:12 | | First period | 16:18 – Mason McTavish (1); 17:45 – pp – Mikael Granlund (1) |
| Kasperi Kapanen (3) – 03:57; Ryan Nugent-Hopkins (1) – 05:39 | | Second period | 12:37 – Alex Killorn (2) |
| Connor McDavid (1) – pp – 08:36 | | Third period | 02:53 – Beckett Sennecke (1); 03:35 – Leo Carlsson (2); 16:57 – Jeffrey Viel (1); 18:27 – en – Jackson LaCombe (1) |
| Connor Ingram 32 saves / 39 shots | | Goalie stats | Lukas Dostal 20 saves / 24 shots |

| April 26 | Edmonton Oilers | 3–4 | OT | Anaheim Ducks | Honda Center | Recap |
| Kaspari Kapanen (4) – 00:38; Ryan Nugent-Hopkins (2) – 06:32 | | First period | | No scoring |
| No scoring | | Second period | | 07:36 – Cutter Gauthier (3); 18:43 – Mikael Granlund (2) |
| Evan Bouchard (1) – 03:27 | | Third period | | 13:31 – Jeffrey Viel (2) |
| No scoring | | First overtime period | | 02:29 – Ryan Poehling (3) |
| Tristan Jarry 34 saves / 38 shots | | Goalie stats | | Lukas Dostal 24 saves / 27 shots |

| April 28 | Anaheim Ducks | 1–4 | Edmonton Oilers | Rogers Place | Recap |
| No scoring | | First period | 00:38 – Vasily Podkolzin (2); 08:33 – Zach Hyman (2); 10:13 – Leon Draisaitl (2) |
| Alex Killorn (3) – pp – 08:26 | | Second period | 10:24 – pp – Leon Draisaitl (3) |
| No scoring | | Third period | No scoring |
| Lukas Dostal 6 saves / 9 shots Ville Husso 10 saves / 11 shots | | Goalie stats | Connor Ingram 29 saves / 30 shots |

| April 30 | Edmonton Oilers | 2–5 | Anaheim Ducks | Honda Center | Recap |
| Connor Murphy (2) – 15:14 | | First period | 09:56 – Ryan Poehling (4); 13:43 – Chris Kreider (1); 16:50 – pp – Cutter Gauthier (4) |
| No scoring | | Second period | 19:13 – Troy Terry (3) |
| Vasily Podkolzin (3) – 01:13 | | Third period | 17:26 – Leo Carlsson (3) |
| Connor Ingram 26 saves / 30 shots | | Goalie stats | Lukas Dostal 25 saves / 27 shots |

| Anaheim wins series 4–2 |

== Second round ==
=== Eastern Conference second round ===
==== (A1) Buffalo Sabres vs. (A3) Montreal Canadiens ====
This was the eighth playoff meeting between these two teams with Montreal winning four of the seven previous series. They last met in the 1998 Eastern Conference semifinals, which Buffalo won in a four-game sweep. These teams split their four-game regular season series.

The Canadiens defeated the Sabres in seven games. In game one, Josh Doan and Ryan McLeod both provided a goal and an assist for the Sabres, defeating the Canadiens 4–2. Alex Newhook scored twice and Jakub Dobeš made 29 saves for the Canadiens, defeating the Sabres 5–1. Newhook scored twice again in game three as the Canadiens routed the Sabres 6–2. In game four, Tage Thompson provided a goal and an assist to give the Sabres a 3–2 victory, tying the series 2–2. Nick Suzuki scored a goal and two assists and Juraj Slafkovský assisted thrice in game five, helping Montreal secure a 6–3 victory and a 3–2 series lead. Buffalo came back from a two-goal deficit in game six, scoring seven unanswered goals en route to an 8–3 victory and forcing a seventh game. In game seven, the Sabres forced overtime after being down 2–0. In overtime, Alex Newhook scored to give Montreal a 3–2 victory, and a conference final berth.

| May 6 | Montreal Canadiens | 2–4 | Buffalo Sabres | KeyBank Center | Recap |
| Nick Suzuki (2) – pp – 19:16 | | First period | 04:31 – Josh Doan (2); 13:26 – pp – Ryan McLeod (1) |
| Kirby Dach (3) – 16:31 | | Second period | 03:32 – Jordan Greenway (1); 09:01 – pp – Bowen Byram (4) |
| No scoring | | Third period | No scoring |
| Jakub Dobes 12 saves / 16 shots | | Goalie stats | Alex Lyon 26 saves / 28 shots |

| May 8 | Montreal Canadiens | 5–1 | Buffalo Sabres | KeyBank Center | Recap |
| Alex Newhook (2) – 01:36; Mike Matheson (1) – 04:27 | | First period | No scoring |
| Alex Newhook (3) – 04:47 | | Second period | 19:21 – Zach Benson (3) |
| Alexandre Carrier (1) – 03:54; Nick Suzuki (3) – en – 15:59 | | Third period | No scoring |
| Jakub Dobes 29 saves / 30 shots | | Goalie stats | Alex Lyon 23 saves / 27 shots |

| May 10 | Buffalo Sabres | 2–6 | Montreal Canadiens | Bell Centre | Recap |
| Tage Thompson (3) – 00:53 | | First period | 15:31 – Alex Newhook (4) |
| Rasmus Dahlin (2) – 14:46 | | Second period | 06:05 – pp – Cole Caufield (2); 10:43 – Zachary Bolduc (2); 12:17 – pp – Juraj Slafkovský (4) |
| No scoring | | Third period | 08:46 – Kirby Dach (4); 15:14 – awd, en – Alex Newhook (5) |
| Alex Lyon 31 saves / 36 shots | | Goalie stats | Jakub Dobes 26 saves / 28 shots |

| May 12 | Buffalo Sabres | 3–2 | Montreal Canadiens | Bell Centre | Recap |
| Mattias Samuelsson (3) – 06:32 | | First period | 10:08 – Alex Newhook (6); 19:47 – pp – Cole Caufield (3) |
| Tage Thompson (4) – pp – 07:00 | | Second period | No scoring |
| Zach Benson (4) – pp – 04:41 | | Third period | No scoring |
| Ukko-Pekka Luukkonen 28 saves / 30 shots | | Goalie stats | Jakub Dobeš 19 saves / 22 shots |

| May 14 | Montreal Canadiens | 6–3 | Buffalo Sabres | KeyBank Center | Recap |
| Cole Caufield (4) – 06:31; Alexandre Texier (3) – 07:54 | | First period | 02:00 – Jason Zucker (1); 07:45 – Josh Doan (3); 10:15 – Konsta Helenius (1) |
| Josh Anderson (3) – 08:01; Jake Evans (1) – 16:12; Nick Suzuki (4) – pp – 17:33 | | Second period | No scoring |
| Ivan Demidov (1) – pp – 03:32 | | Third period | No scoring |
| Jakub Dobes 33 saves / 36 shots | | Goalie stats | Ukko-Pekka Luukkonen 18 saves / 23 shots Alex Lyon 2 saves / 3 shots |

| May 16 | Buffalo Sabres | 8–3 | Montreal Canadiens | Bell Centre | Recap |
| Rasmus Dahlin (3) – 00:32; Jason Zucker (2) – pp – 13:56 | | First period | 01:40 – Arber Xhekaj (1); 08:12 – pp – Ivan Demidov (2); 10:14 – sh – Jake Evans (2) |
| Zach Benson (5) – 01:00; Jack Quinn (1) – pp – 10:54; Konsta Helenius (2) – 12:59 | | Second period | No scoring |
| Jack Quinn (2) – pp – 09:58; Tage Thompson (5) – en – 14:12; Zach Metsa (1) – pp – 17:49 | | Third period | No scoring |
| Alex Lyon 1 save / 4 shots Ukko-Pekka Luukkonen 18 saves / 18 shots | | Goalie stats | Jakub Dobes 27 saves / 33 shots Jacob Fowler 1 save / 2 shots |

| May 18 | Montreal Canadiens | 3–2 | OT | Buffalo Sabres | KeyBank Center | Recap |
| Phillip Danault (1) – 04:30; Zachary Bolduc (3) – pp – 14:29 | | First period | | No scoring |
| No scoring | | Second period | | 13:19 – Jordan Greenway (2) |
| No scoring | | Third period | | 06:27 – Rasmus Dahlin (4) |
| Alex Newhook (7) – 11:22 | | First overtime period | | No scoring |
| Jakub Dobes 37 saves / 39 shots | | Goalie stats | | Ukko-Pekka Luukkonen 22 saves / 25 shots |

| Montreal wins series 4–3 |

==== (M1) Carolina Hurricanes vs. (M3) Philadelphia Flyers ====
This was the first playoff meeting between these two teams. Carolina won three of the four games in the regular season series.

The Hurricanes defeated the Flyers in a four-game sweep. In game one, Logan Stankoven continued his goal-scoring streak, scoring twice while Frederik Andersen stopped all 19 shots to defeat the Flyers 3–0. The Hurricanes came back from a two-goal deficit in game two as Taylor Hall scored in overtime to give Carolina a 2–0 series lead. In game three, Andrei Svechnikov scored a goal and provided an assist, giving Carolina a 3–0 series lead with a 4–1 victory. Game four was tied 2–2 going into overtime, wherein, Jackson Blake scored his second goal of the game, sending Carolina to the conference final with a 3–2 victory. Carolina became the first team to have back-to-back series sweeps since the 1992 Chicago Blackhawks and Pittsburgh Penguins. Carolina is also the first team since the 1985 Edmonton Oilers to start the playoffs 8–0 and the first to do so since the four-round, best-of-seven format was introduced in 1987.

| May 2 | Philadelphia Flyers | 0–3 | Carolina Hurricanes | Lenovo Center | Recap |
| No scoring | | First period | 01:31 – Logan Stankoven (5); 07:30 – Jackson Blake (2) |
| No scoring | | Second period | 16:16 – Logan Stankoven (6) |
| No scoring | | Third period | No scoring |
| Daniel Vladar 20 saves / 23 shots | | Goalie stats | Frederik Andersen 19 saves / 19 shots |

| May 4 | Philadelphia Flyers | 2–3 | OT | Carolina Hurricanes | Lenovo Center | Recap |
| Jamie Drysdale (2) – pp – 04:02; Sean Couturier (1) – 04:41 | | First period | | 10:21 – pp – Nikolaj Ehlers (1) |
| No scoring | | Second period | | No scoring |
| No scoring | | Third period | | 11:21 – Seth Jarvis (1) |
| No scoring | | First overtime period | | 18:54 – Taylor Hall (3) |
| Daniel Vladar 39 saves / 42 shots | | Goalie stats | | Frederik Andersen 34 saves / 36 shots |

| May 7 | Carolina Hurricanes | 4–1 | Philadelphia Flyers | Xfinity Mobile Arena | Recap |
| Jordan Staal (1) – pp –17:27 | | First period | No scoring |
| Jalen Chatfield (1) – sh – 15:59 | | Second period | 02:31 – Trevor Zegras (2) |
| Andrei Svechnikov (1) – pp – 03:52; Nikolaj Ehlers (2) – 07:08 | | Third period | No scoring |
| Frederik Andersen 18 saves / 19 shots | | Goalie stats | Daniel Vladar 26 saves / 30 shots |

| May 9 | Carolina Hurricanes | 3–2 | OT | Philadelphia Flyers | Xfinity Mobile Arena | Recap |
| No scoring | | First period | | 07:50 – Tyson Foerster (1) |
| Jackson Blake (3) – 12:35 | | Second period | | No scoring |
| Logan Stankoven (7) – 04:13 | | Third period | | 05:52 – Alex Bump (2) |
| Jackson Blake (4) – 05:28 | | First overtime period | | No scoring |
| Frederik Andersen 15 saves / 17 shots | | Goalie stats | | Daniel Vladar 37 saves / 40 shots |

| Carolina wins series 4–0 |

=== Western Conference second round ===
==== (C1) Colorado Avalanche vs. (C3) Minnesota Wild ====
This was the fourth playoff meeting between these two teams, with Minnesota winning two of the three previous series. They last met in the 2014 Western Conference first round, which Minnesota won in seven games. These teams split their four-game regular-season series.

The Avalanche defeated the Wild in five games. Game one was a high-scoring affair as Cale Makar, Devon Toews, and Martin Nečas each had three or more points for the Avalanche while Quinn Hughes had three for the Wild. During the game, the Wild came back from a three-goal deficit to briefly take the lead 5–4, but the Avalanche scored five more goals to emerge victorious 9–6. In game two, Nathan MacKinnon scored a goal and assisted twice for the Avalanche as they defeated the Wild 5–2. Kirill Kaprizov had three points and Jesper Wallstedt made 35 saves in game three for the Wild, defeating the Avalanche 5–1. In game four, the Avalanche recovered from an early 1–0 deficit defeating Minnesota 5–2 to take a 3–1 series lead. The Avalanche came back from a 3–0 deficit in game five, scoring in overtime on Brett Kulak, sending Colorado to the conference final with a 4–3 victory.

| May 3 | Minnesota Wild | 6–9 | Colorado Avalanche | Ball Arena | Recap |
| Marcus Johansson (2) – 15:02; Ryan Hartman (2) – 16:04 | | First period | 11:12 – Sam Malinski (1); 12:04 – Jack Drury (1); 13:13 – pp – Artturi Lehkonen (3) |
| Vladimir Tarasenko (2) – 06:45; Quinn Hughes (3) – 12:43; Marcus Foligno (2) – sh – 16:55 | | Second period | 04:16 – Nick Blankenburg (1); 18:04 – Devon Toews (2) |
| Mats Zuccarello (2) – 16:01 | | Third period | 03:21 – Cale Makar (3); 05:42 – Nazem Kadri (1); 17:06 – Cale Makar (4); 17:52 – en – Nathan MacKinnon (3) |
| Jesper Wallstedt 34 saves / 42 shots | | Goalie stats | Scott Wedgewood 30 saves / 36 shots |

| May 5 | Minnesota Wild | 2–5 | Colorado Avalanche | Ball Arena | Recap |
| Kirill Kaprizov (3) – 02:57 | | First period | 02:51 – Martin Necas (1) |
| No scoring | | Second period | 08:24 – pp – Gabriel Landeskog (3); 01:24 – Nicolas Roy (3) |
| Marcus Johansson (3) – 14:33 | | Third period | 13:18 – pp – Nathan MacKinnon (4); 19:55 – en – Valeri Nichushkin (1) |
| Filip Gustavsson 18 saves / 22 shots | | Goalie stats | Scott Wedgewood 29 saves / 31 shots |

| May 9 | Colorado Avalanche | 1–5 | Minnesota Wild | Grand Casino Arena | Recap |
| No scoring | | First period | 15:11 – Kirill Kaprizov (4); 16:44 – pp – Quinn Hughes (4) |
| Nathan MacKinnon (5) – 13:11 | | Second period | 04:21 – pp – Ryan Hartman (3); 13:31 – Brock Faber (4) |
| No scoring | | Third period | 19:54 – en – Matt Boldy (7) |
| Scott Wedgewood 9 saves / 12 shots Mackenzie Blackwood 12 saves / 13 shots | | Goalie stats | Jesper Wallstedt 35 saves / 36 shots |

| May 11 | Colorado Avalanche | 5–2 | Minnesota Wild | Grand Casino Arena | Recap |
| No scoring | | First period | 09:46 – pp – Danila Yurov (1) |
| Nazem Kadri (2) – pp – 06:08 | | Second period | No scoring |
| Ross Colton (1) – 06:56; Parker Kelly (1) – 11:32; Nathan MacKinnon (6) – en – 19:27; Brock Nelson (2) – en – 19:52 | | Third period | 09:15 – Nico Sturm (1) |
| Mackenzie Blackwood 19 saves / 21 shots | | Goalie stats | Jesper Wallstedt 29 saves / 32 shots |

| May 13 | Minnesota Wild | 3–4 | OT | Colorado Avalanche | Ball Arena | Recap |
| Marcus Johansson (4) – 00:34; Nick Foligno (1) – 11:03; Nick Foligno (2) – 15:56 | | First period | | No scoring |
| No scoring | | Second period | | 11:00 – Parker Kelly (2) |
| No scoring | | Third period | | 16:27 – Jack Drury (2); 18:37 – Nathan MacKinnon (7) |
| No scoring | | First overtime period | | 03:52 – Brett Kulak (1) |
| Jesper Wallstedt 30 saves / 34 shots | | Goalie stats | | Mackenzie Blackwood 10 saves / 13 shots Scott Wedgewood 7 saves / 7 shots |

| Colorado wins series 4–1 |

==== (P1) Vegas Golden Knights vs. (P3) Anaheim Ducks ====
This was the first playoff meeting between these two teams. Anaheim won all three games in the regular season series.

The Golden Knights defeated the Ducks in six games. Carter Hart made 33 saves for the Golden Knights in game one, backstopping Vegas to a 3–1 victory. In game two, Lukáš Dostál made 21 saves for the Ducks, tying the series with a 3–1 victory. Mitch Marner had a hat trick in game three for the Golden Knights, defeating the Ducks 6–2. In game four, Cutter Gauthier assisted thrice for the Ducks, tying the series 2–2 with a 4–3 victory. Pavel Dorofeyev scored twice, including the overtime-winning goal in game five for the Golden Knights, defeating the Ducks 3–2 to take a 3–2 series lead. In game six, Dorofeyev scored twice and Hart made 31 saves for Golden Knights, sending Vegas to the conference final with a 5–1 victory.

| May 4 | Anaheim Ducks | 1–3 | Vegas Golden Knights | T-Mobile Arena | Recap |
| No scoring | | First period | 03:14 – Brett Howden (5) |
| No scoring | | Second period | No scoring |
| Mikael Granlund (3) – 13:37 | | Third period | 15:02 – Ivan Barbashev (3); 19:54 – en – Mitch Marner (3) |
| Lukas Dostal 19 saves / 21 shots | | Goalie stats | Carter Hart 33 saves / 34 shots |

| May 6 | Anaheim Ducks | 3–1 | Vegas Golden Knights | T-Mobile Arena | Recap |
| No scoring | | First period | No scoring |
| Beckett Sennecke (2) – 11:23 | | Second period | No scoring |
| Leo Carlsson (4) – 06:36; Jansen Harkins (1) – en – 16:30 | | Third period | 19:53 – pp – Mark Stone (3) |
| Lukas Dostal 21 saves / 22 shots | | Goalie stats | Carter Hart 25 saves / 27 shots |

| May 8 | Vegas Golden Knights | 6–2 | Anaheim Ducks | Honda Center | Recap |
| Shea Theodore (3) – 01:06; Brayden McNabb (1) – sh – 12:13; Mitch Marner (4) – pp – 19:55 | | First period | No scoring |
| Mitch Marner (5) – 09:19; Mitch Marner (6) – 17:56 | | Second period | No scoring |
| Brett Howden (5) – en – 18:04 | | Third period | 06:30 – Beckett Sennecke (3); 15:09 – Chris Kreider (2) |
| Carter Hart 31 saves / 33 shots | | Goalie stats | Lukas Dostal 5 saves / 8 shots Ville Husso 17 saves / 19 shots |

| May 10 | Vegas Golden Knights | 3–4 | Anaheim Ducks | Honda Center | Recap |
| Pavel Dorofeyev (5) – pp – 10:22 | | First period | 08:43 – pp – Beckett Sennecke (4); 15:25 – Mikael Granlund (4) |
| Brett Howden (7) – 04:04 | | Second period | 17:58 – pp – Alex Killorn (4) |
| Tomas Hertl (1) – 18:56 | | Third period | 03:43 – Ian Moore (1) |
| Carter Hart 19 saves / 23 shots | | Goalie stats | Lukas Dostal 18 saves / 21 shots |

| May 12 | Anaheim Ducks | 2–3 | OT | Vegas Golden Knights | T-Mobile Arena | Recap |
| Beckett Sennecke (5) – pp – 12:36 | | First period | | 16:13 – pp – Pavel Dorofeyev (6) |
| No scoring | | Second period | | No scoring |
| Olen Zellweger (1) – 16:55 | | Third period | | 04:48 – Tomas Hertl (2) |
| No scoring | | First overtime period | | 04:10 – Pavel Dorofeyev (7) |
| Lukas Dostal 29 saves / 32 shots | | Goalie stats | | Carter Hart 34 saves / 36 shots |

| May 14 | Vegas Golden Knights | 5–1 | Anaheim Ducks | Honda Center | Recap |
| Mitch Marner (7) – 01:02; Brett Howden (8) – sh – 08:30; Shea Theodore (4) – pp – 17:19 | | First period | No scoring |
| No scoring | | Second period | 12:46 – Mikael Granlund (5) |
| Pavel Dorofeyev (8) – 02:52; Pavel Dorofeyev (9) – 13:30 | | Third period | No scoring |
| Carter Hart 31 saves / 32 shots | | Goalie stats | Lukas Dostal 16 saves / 21 shots |

| Vegas wins series 4–2 |

== Conference finals ==
=== Eastern Conference final ===
==== (M1) Carolina Hurricanes vs. (A3) Montreal Canadiens ====
This was the eighth playoff meeting between these two teams, with Montreal winning five of the seven previous series. They last met in the 2006 Eastern Conference quarterfinals, which Carolina won in six games. Carolina made their second consecutive and seventh overall conference finals appearance. Carolina lost the previous year's Eastern Conference final against the Florida Panthers, in five games. This was Montreal's ninth appearance in the semifinal/conference finals since the league began using a 16-team or greater playoff format in 1980. Their most recent appearance was in the 2021 semifinals, which Montreal won against the Vegas Golden Knights in six games. Montreal won all three games in the regular season series.

Carolina defeated the Canadiens in five games. Juraj Slafkovský scored twice in Montreal's 6–2 rout of Carolina in game one, with the Canadiens scoring four goals in the first period. The Hurricanes then tied the series in game two with Nikolaj Ehlers's overtime goal, his second goal of the game, winning 3–2. In game three, Andrei Svechnikov scored for Carolina in overtime, giving the Hurricanes a 3–2 victory. The Hurricanes shut out the Canadiens 4–0 in game four with Frederik Andersen stopping all 18 shots he faced. In game five, Logan Stankoven provided a goal and two assists for the Hurricanes, defeating Montreal 6–1 to advance to the Stanley Cup Final.

| May 21 | Montreal Canadiens | 6–2 | Carolina Hurricanes | Lenovo Center | Recap |
| Cole Caufield (5) – 01:00; Phillip Danault (2) – 04:04; Alexandre Texier (4) – 08:11; Ivan Demidov (3) – 11:32 | | First period | 00:33 – Seth Jarvis (2) |
| No scoring | | Second period | 02:46 – Eric Robinson (1) |
| Juraj Slafkovsky (5) – 07:05; Juraj Slafkovsky (6) – en – 17:32 | | Third period | No scoring |
| Jakub Dobes 26 saves / 28 shots | | Goalie stats | Frederik Andersen 16 saves / 21 shots |

| May 23 | Montreal Canadiens | 2–3 | OT | Carolina Hurricanes | Lenovo Center | Recap |
| Josh Anderson (4) – 11:11 | | First period | | 02:33 – Eric Robinson (2) |
| No scoring | | Second period | | 17:03 – Nikolaj Ehlers (3) |
| Josh Anderson (5) – 12:51 | | Third period | | No scoring |
| No scoring | | First overtime period | | 03:29 – Nikolaj Ehlers (4) |
| Jakub Dobes 23 saves / 26 shots | | Goalie stats | | Frederik Andersen 10 saves / 12 shots |

| May 25 | Carolina Hurricanes | 3–2 | OT | Montreal Canadiens | Bell Centre | Recap |
| Shayne Gostisbehere (1) – 08:24; Taylor Hall (4) – 16:22 | | First period | | 15:28 – Mike Matheson (2) |
| No scoring | | Second period | | 04:43 – pp – Lane Hutson (3) |
| No scoring | | Third period | | No scoring |
| Andrei Svechnikov (2) – 14:06 | | First overtime period | | No scoring |
| Frederik Andersen 11 saves / 13 shots | | Goalie stats | | Jakub Dobes 36 saves / 39 shots |

| May 27 | Carolina Hurricanes | 4–0 | Montreal Canadiens | Bell Centre | Recap |
| Sebastian Aho (4) – pp – 14:59; Jordan Staal (2) – 16:07; Logan Stankoven (8) – 17:46 | | First period | No scoring |
| No scoring | | Second period | No scoring |
| Andrei Svechnikov (3) – en – 18:06 | | Third period | No scoring |
| Frederik Andersen 18 saves / 18 shots | | Goalie stats | Jakub Dobes 40 saves / 43 shots |

| May 29 | Montreal Canadiens | 1–6 | Carolina Hurricanes | Lenovo Center | Recap |
| No scoring | | First period | 09:17 – Taylor Hall (5); 15:12 – Logan Stankoven (9); 16:52 – Eric Robinson (3) |
| No scoring | | Second period | 07:19 – Jackson Blake (5); 18:02 – pp – Shayne Gostisbehere (3) |
| Cole Caufield (6) – pp – 10:50 | | Third period | 16:19 – en – Seth Jarvis (3) |
| Jakub Dobes 24 saves / 29 shots | | Goalie stats | Frederik Andersen 23 saves / 24 shots |

| Carolina wins series 4–1 |

=== Western Conference final ===
==== (C1) Colorado Avalanche vs. (P1) Vegas Golden Knights ====
This was the second playoff series between these two teams. Their only previous series was in the 2021 West Division second round, which Vegas won in six games. This was Vegas's fifth semifinals/conference finals appearance. Their last appearance was in 2023 against the Dallas Stars, which Vegas won in six games. This was Colorado's tenth appearance in the conference final. They last made the conference final in 2022, which Colorado won against the Edmonton Oilers in a four-game sweep. Colorado won two of the three games in this year's regular season series.

The Golden Knights defeated the Avalanche in a four-game sweep. In game one, Carter Hart made 36 saves for the Golden Knights, holding off the Avalanche for a 4–2 victory. Ivan Barbashev scored twice and provided an assist for the Golden Knights as Hart made 30 saves in game two, backstopping Vegas to a 3–1 victory. The Golden Knights came back from a three-goal deficit in game three, taking a 3–0 series lead with a 5–3 triumph. In game four, Vegas held off the Avalanche in the third period, giving them a 2–1 victory, and a Stanley Cup Final berth. With the series victory, the Golden Knights became the first team to record a sweep over a Presidents' Trophy-winning team since the Tampa Bay Lightning in 2022. This was the only series of the playoffs not to have a game go into overtime.

| May 20 | Vegas Golden Knights | 4–2 | Colorado Avalanche | Ball Arena | Recap |
| No scoring | | First period | No scoring |
| Dylan Coghlan (1) – 12:29; Pavel Dorofeyev (10) – pp – 15:02 | | Second period | No scoring |
| Brett Howden (9) – 01:34; Nic Dowd (3) – en – 19:15 | | Third period | 05:53 – Valeri Nichushkin (2); 17:39 – pp – Gabriel Landeskog (4) |
| Carter Hart 36 saves / 38 shots | | Goalie stats | Scott Wedgewood 24 saves / 27 shots |

| May 22 | Vegas Golden Knights | 3–1 | Colorado Avalanche | Ball Arena | Recap |
| No scoring | | First period | 16:59 – Ross Colton (2) |
| No scoring | | Second period | No scoring |
| Jack Eichel (2) – 09:15; Ivan Barbashev (4) – 11:22; Ivan Barbashev (5) – en – 18:57 | | Third period | No scoring |
| Carter Hart 30 saves / 31 shots | | Goalie stats | Scott Wedgewood 22 saves / 24 shots |

| May 24 | Colorado Avalanche | 3–5 | Vegas Golden Knights | T-Mobile Arena | Recap |
| Gabriel Landeskog (5) – 03:21; Nazem Kadri (3) – 07:03; Jack Drury (3) – sh – 13:15 | | First period | No scoring |
| No scoring | | Second period | 00:19 – pp – Mark Stone (4); 04:05 – William Karlsson (1); 12:46 – Keegan Kolesar (1) |
| No scoring | | Third period | 08:21 – Tomas Hertl (3); 19:01 – en – Brett Howden (10) |
| Scott Wedgewood 18 saves / 22 shots | | Goalie stats | Carter Hart 32 saves / 35 shots |

| May 26 | Colorado Avalanche | 1–2 | Vegas Golden Knights | T-Mobile Arena | Recap |
| No scoring | | First period | 04:42 – Mark Stone (5) |
| No scoring | | Second period | No scoring |
| Gabriel Landeskog (6) – 17:57 | | Third period | 14:15 – Cole Smith (3) |
| Mackenzie Blackwood 24 saves / 26 shots | | Goalie stats | Carter Hart 20 saves / 21 shots |

| Vegas wins series 4–0 |

== Stanley Cup Final ==
This was the first playoff meeting between these two teams. This is the third Final appearance for both teams; Carolina won their most recent appearance against the Edmonton Oilers in 2006, and Vegas won their most recent appearance against the Florida Panthers in 2023. Vegas won both games in the regular season series.

| June 2 | Vegas Golden Knights | 5–4 | Carolina Hurricanes | Lenovo Center | Recap |
| Shea Theodore (5) – 13:28 | | First period | 00:25 – Nikolaj Ehlers (5); 12:08 – Nikolaj Ehlers (6) |
| Ivan Barbashev (6) – 00:30; William Karlsson (2) – 04:35 | | Second period | 12:42 – Jordan Staal (3) |
| Brett Howden (11) – 01:21; Tomas Hertl (4) – 16:36 | | Third period | 11:19 – Shayne Gostisbehere (3) |
| Carter Hart 25 saves / 29 shots | | Goalie stats | Frederik Andersen 18 saves / 23 shots |

| June 4 | Vegas Golden Knights | 3–4 | OT | Carolina Hurricanes | Lenovo Center | Recap |
| Brett Howden (12) – 13:33 | | First period | | No scoring |
| Brett Howden (13) – 07:23 | | Second period | | No scoring |
| Mark Stone (6) – 18:39 | | Third period | | 10:20 – Logan Stankoven (10); 12:46 – Mark Jankowski (1); 15:25 – pp – Jordan Staal (4) |
| No scoring | | First overtime period | | 03:56 – Seth Jarvis (4) |
| Carter Hart 22 saves / 26 shots | | Goalie stats | | Frederik Andersen 23 saves / 26 shots |

| June 6 | Carolina Hurricanes | 4–5 | 2OT | Vegas Golden Knights | T-Mobile Arena | Recap |
| No scoring | | First period | | No scoring |
| No scoring | | Second period | | 10:26 – pp – Tomas Hertl (5); 10:42 – Mitch Marner (8); 14:32 – Mitch Marner (9); 16:52 – Mitch Marner (10) |
| Jordan Martinook (2) – 07:03; Taylor Hall (6) – 07:29; Jordan Staal (5) – 07:42; Andrei Svechnikov (4) – pp – 18:18 | | Third period | | No scoring |
| No scoring | | Second overtime period | | 05:38 – Shea Theodore (6) |
| Frederik Andersen 12 saves / 16 shots Brandon Bussi 18 saves / 19 shots | | Goalie stats | | Carter Hart 29 saves / 33 shots |

| June 9 | Carolina Hurricanes | 5–3 | Vegas Golden Knights | T-Mobile Arena | Recap |
| Logan Stankoven (11) – 01:06; Jackson Blake (6) – 03:28; Jordan Staal (6) – pp – 12:48 | | First period | 07:22 – Mark Stone (7) |
| No scoring | | Second period | 04:22 – William Karlsson (3); 17:08 – Brett Howden (14) |
| Jordan Staal (7) – 06:32; Nikolaj Ehlers (7) – en – 19:05 | | Third period | No scoring |
| Brandon Bussi 18 saves / 21 shots | | Goalie stats | Carter Hart 23 saves / 27 shots |

| June 11 | Vegas Golden Knights | 2–4 | Carolina Hurricanes | Lenovo Center | Recap |
| Pavel Dorofeyev (11) – pp – 06:52 | | First period | 11:46 – Jordan Staal (8) |
| No scoring | | Second period | 11:58 – pp – Andrei Svechnikov (5); 17:51 – Sebastian Aho (5) |
| Pavel Dorofeyev (12) – 13:49 | | Third period | 11:08 – pp – Andrei Svechnikov (6) |
| Carter Hart 20 saves / 24 shots | | Goalie stats | Brandon Bussi 23 saves / 25 shots |

| June 14 | Carolina Hurricanes | 3–0 | Vegas Golden Knights | T-Mobile Arena | Recap |
| Taylor Hall (7) – 03:47 | | First period | No scoring |
| Jackson Blake (7) – 13:31 | | Second period | No scoring |
| Nikolaj Ehlers (8) – en – 18:52 | | Third period | No scoring |
| Brandon Bussi 22 saves / 22 shots | | Goalie stats | Carter Hart 20 saves / 22 shots |

| Carolina wins series 4–2 |

== Player statistics ==
=== Skaters ===
These were the top ten skaters based on points, following the conclusion of games played on June 14, 2026.

| Player | Team | GP | G | A | Pts | +/– | PIM |
|---|---|---|---|---|---|---|---|
| Mitch Marner | Vegas Golden Knights | 22 | 10 | 19 | 29 | +11 | 6 |
| Jack Eichel | Vegas Golden Knights | 22 | 2 | 20 | 22 | +4 | 16 |
| Jackson Blake | Carolina Hurricanes | 19 | 7 | 13 | 20 | +8 | 24 |
| Taylor Hall | Carolina Hurricanes | 19 | 7 | 12 | 19 | +14 | 14 |
| Brett Howden | Vegas Golden Knights | 22 | 14 | 4 | 18 | +11 | 6 |
| Nikolaj Ehlers | Carolina Hurricanes | 18 | 8 | 10 | 18 | +9 | 6 |
| Shea Theodore | Vegas Golden Knights | 22 | 6 | 12 | 18 | +10 | 10 |
| Pavel Dorofeyev | Vegas Golden Knights | 22 | 12 | 4 | 16 | +2 | 0 |
| Logan Stankoven | Carolina Hurricanes | 19 | 11 | 5 | 16 | +8 | 8 |
| Nick Suzuki | Montreal Canadiens | 19 | 4 | 12 | 16 | –8 | 6 |

=== Goaltenders ===
This is a combined table of the top 5 goaltenders based on goals against average and the goaltenders based on save percentage, with at least 420 minutes played, following the conclusion of games played on June 14, 2026. The table is sorted by GAA, and the criteria for inclusion are bolded.

| Player | Team | GP | W | L | SA | GA | GAA | SV% | SO | TOI |
|---|---|---|---|---|---|---|---|---|---|---|
| Frederik Andersen | Carolina Hurricanes | 16 | 13 | 2 | 354 | 32 | **1.89** | **.910** | 3 | 1014:18 |
| Daniel Vladar | Philadelphia Flyers | 10 | 4 | 6 | 294 | 23 | **2.18** | **.922** | 2 | 633:20 |
| Andrei Vasilevskiy | Tampa Bay Lightning | 7 | 3 | 4 | 156 | 16 | **2.18** | .897 | 1 | 439:45 |
| Scott Wedgewood | Colorado Avalanche | 11 | 7 | 4 | 260 | 25 | **2.47** | .904 | 0 | 606:07 |
| Carter Hart | Vegas Golden Knights | 22 | 14 | 8 | 637 | 59 | **2.56** | **.909** | 0 | 1380:19 |
| Jakub Dobes | Montreal Canadiens | 19 | 9 | 10 | 564 | 52 | 2.66 | **.908** | 0 | 1173:11 |
| Jesper Wallstedt | Minnesota Wild | 10 | 5 | 5 | 329 | 30 | 2.77 | **.909** | 0 | 650:55 |

== Media ==
=== Canada ===
This was the 12th and final postseason of the league's Canadian national broadcast rights deal with Rogers Sports & Media before a new 12-season contract begins next season (2026–27). Shortly after the 2026 Stanley Cup Final concluded, the CBC announced that it would no longer sublicense NHL games from Rogers, making game six the last NHL game to air on CBC Television.

Games aired across Sportsnet, SN1, SN360, and CBC under the Hockey Night in Canada brand. For first and second-round U.S.–U.S. games not on CBC, Sportsnet used some the U.S. feed instead of producing their own telecast. The 2026 Stanley Cup Final was simulcast on both CBC and Sportsnet.

Sportsnet+ streamed all games.

=== United States ===
This was the fifth season of the league's seven-year U.S. national broadcast rights deals with the ESPN family of networks and TNT Sports.

First- and second-round games were split between ESPN-produced telecasts (either on ESPN, ABC, or ESPN2) and TNT Sports-produced telecasts (either on TNT or TBS, with selected simulcasts on TruTV). Each U.S. team's regional broadcaster also televised local coverage of first-round games.

ESPN/ABC had the first choice of which conference final series to air, choosing the Western Conference finals this season. As a result, TNT Sports broadcast the Eastern Conference finals. As per the alternating rotation, ABC has coverage of the 2026 Stanley Cup Final.

All ESPN games streamed on the ESPN app's unlimited tier, while TNT games streamed on HBO Max.

== Notes ==
| Preceded by 2025 Stanley Cup playoffs | Stanley Cup playoffs 2026 | Succeeded by 2027 Stanley Cup playoffs |
