= List of Utah Mammoth seasons =

Lists of seasons played by the Utah Hockey Club

The Utah Mammoth are a professional ice hockey team based in Salt Lake City. The Mammoth compete in the National Hockey League (NHL) as a member of the Central Division of the Western Conference. The team was created on April 18, 2024, with the NHL Board of Governors granting an expansion franchise to Utah Jazz owner Ryan Smith. In lieu of an expansion draft to stock the new team, Smith acquired the hockey assets (players, coaching staff, and draft picks) of the Arizona Coyotes, which suspended hockey operations at the same time. The team began play during the league's 2024–25 season.

== Table keys ==
Key of colors and symbols
Color/symbol	Explanation
†	Stanley Cup champions
‡	Conference champions
↑	Division champions
#	Led league in points

Key of terms and abbreviations
Term or abbreviation	Definition
Finish	Final position in division or league standings
GP	Number of games played
W	Number of wins
L	Number of losses
OT	Number of losses in overtime
Pts	Number of points
GF	Goals for (goals scored by Utah)
GA	Goals against (goals scored by the Utah's opponents)
—	Does not apply

== Year by year ==
List of Utah Mammoth seasons
NHL season	Utah season	Conference	Division	Regular season								Postseason					
NHL season	Utah season	Conference	Division	Finish	GP	W	L	OT	Pts	GF	GA	GP	W	L	GF	GA	Result
2024–25	2024–25	Western	Central	6th	82	38	31	13	89	241	251	—	—	—	—	—	Did not qualify
2025–26	2025–26	Western	Central	4th	82	43	33	6	92	268	240	6	2	4	18	23	Lost in first round, 2–4 (Golden Knights)
Totals					164	81	64	19	181	509	491	6	2	4	18	23	1 playoff appearance

== All-time records ==
Statistic	GP	W	L	OT
Regular season record (2024–present)	164	81	64	19
Postseason record (2024–present)	6	2	4	—
All-time regular and postseason record	170	83	68	19
All-time playoff series record: 0–1
