= Pavel Dorofeyev =

Russian ice hockey player (born 2000)

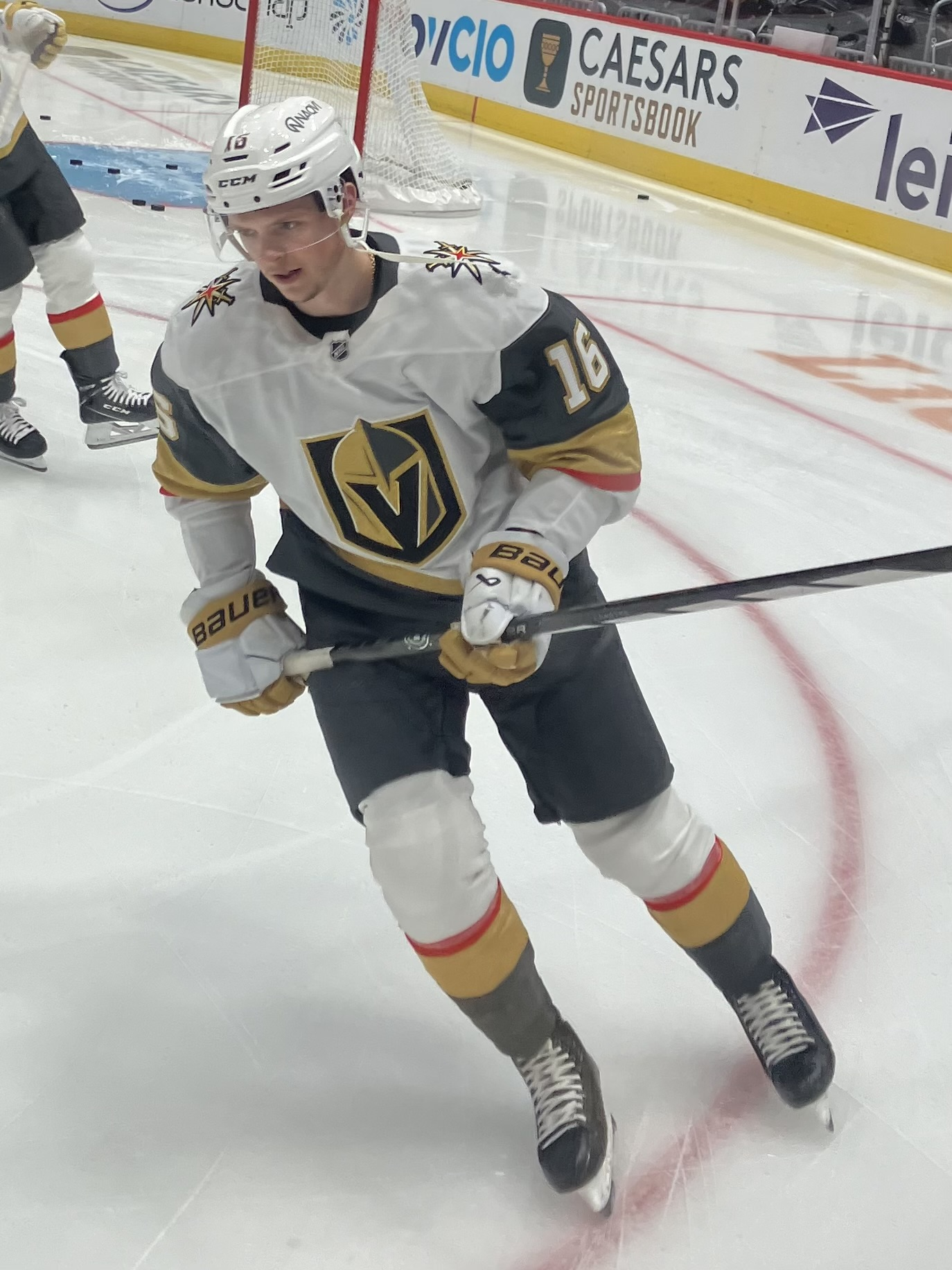
- Dorofeyev with the Vegas Golden Knights in 2024
- Born: 26 October 2000 (age 25) Nizhny Tagil, Russia
- Height: 6 ft 1 in (185 cm)
- Weight: 194 lb (88 kg; 13 st 12 lb)
- Position: Winger
- Shoots: Left
- NHL team Former teams: New York Rangers; Metallurg Magnitogorsk; Traktor Chelyabinsk; Vegas Golden Knights
- NHL draft: 79th overall, 2019; Vegas Golden Knights
- Playing career: 2018–present

Pavel Igorevich Dorofeyev (Russian: Павел Игоревич Дорофеев; born 26 October 2000) is a Russian professional ice hockey player who is a winger for the New York Rangers of the National Hockey League (NHL). Dorofeyev was selected in the third round of the 2019 NHL entry draft, 79th overall, by the Vegas Golden Knights.

== Playing career ==
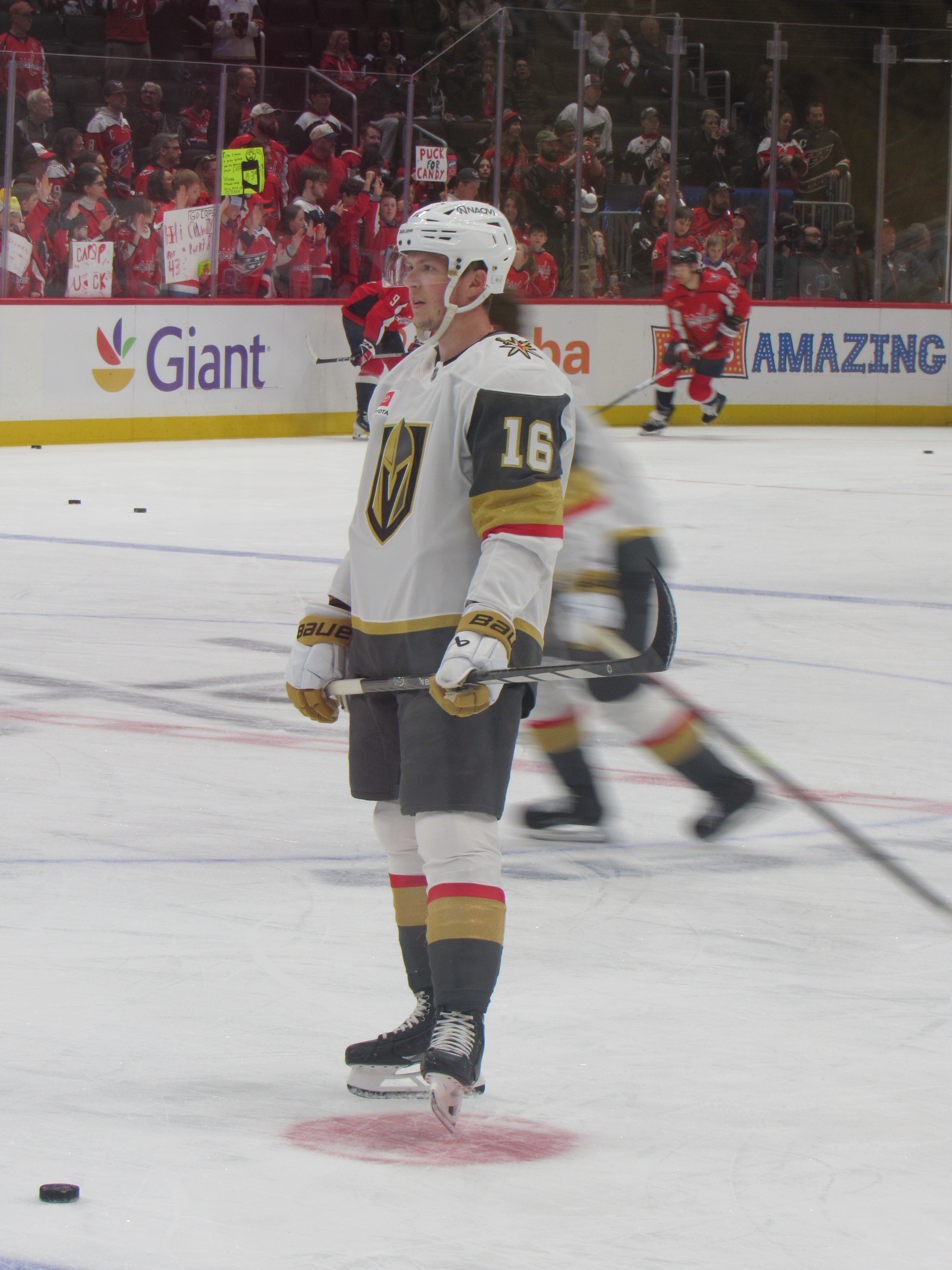
Dorofeyev with the Golden Knights in 2026.

Dorofeyev played as a youth in his native Russia within the junior ranks of Metallurg Magnitogorsk. Following his second season in the KHL with Metallurg in 2019–20, Dorofeyev was traded by the club along with three other prospects to Traktor Chelyabinsk in exchange for Vladislav Semin on 11 June 2020.

He began the 2020–21 season, with Chelaybinsk affiliate, Chelmet Chelyabinsk of the Supreme Hockey League (VHL), posting eight goals and 17 points through 36 regular season games. He made his lone KHL appearance with Traktor Chelyabinsk in a 4–2 victory over Kunlun Red Star on 7 October 2020.

With the pandemic-delayed North American season approaching, Dorofeyev ended his contract with Traktor Chelyabinsk and was signed to a three-year, entry-level contract with the Vegas Golden Knights on 25 January 2021. He was then assigned to join the Golden Knights' new AHL affiliate, the Henderson Silver Knights, in their training camp.

Dorofeyev made his NHL debut with Vegas in their 2021–22 season opening game, a 4–3 victory over the Seattle Kraken. After spending most of the 2021–22 and 2022–23 seasons with Henderson, Dorofeyev was again recalled to Vegas' roster in March 2023; he then recorded his first NHL point and first NHL goal on 12 March 2023, with an assist on a William Karlsson first-period goal later followed by a go-ahead deflection goal off his helmet in the third period.

After recording seven goals and nine points in 18 games played during the 2022–23 season, and with his entry-level contract expiring, Dorofeyev signed a one-year extension with Vegas on 19 July 2023. After a career-high 47 games in the 2023–24 season, Dorofeyev signed a further two-year extension with Vegas on 1 July 2024.

Dorofeyev scored his first career hat trick on 14 January 2025, recording a natural hat trick across the second and third periods of a 5–3 loss to the Nashville Predators. Just two months later, on 20 March, he scored his second hat trick, contributing three goals in a 5–1 victory over the Boston Bruins, and in the process recording the first 30-goal season of his career. In Vegas' 2025–26 season opener, Dorofeyev recorded his third career hat trick, scoring all three of his goals in the second period of a 6–5 shootout loss to the Los Angeles Kings. After scoring again in each of his next two games, for a total of five goals in three games, Dorofeyev was named the NHL's First Star of the Week for opening week of the season.

In the first round of the 2026 Stanley Cup Playoffs, Dorofeyev scored his first post-season hat trick of his career. His third goal was the game-tying goal with less than a minute left in regulation that would eventually lead to a 5–4 double overtime win against the Utah Mammoth in Game 5. The Golden Knights would advance all the way to the Stanley Cup Final but would ultimately be defeated by the Carolina Hurricanes in six games.

On 26 June 2026, Dorofeyev was traded to the New York Rangers in exchange for two first-round picks and a third-round pick, subsequently signing a seven-year, $77 million extension with the team four days later on 30 June.

== Career statistics ==
=== Regular season and playoffs ===
			Regular season					Playoffs
Season	Team	League	GP	G	A	Pts	PIM	GP	G	A	Pts	PIM
2017–18	Stalnye Lisy	MHL	48	19	20	39	14	5	2	1	3	6
2018–19	Stalnye Lisy	MHL	19	17	14	31	14	3	0	2	2	0
2018–19	Metallurg Magnitogorsk	KHL	23	1	1	2	4	4	0	0	0	0
2019–20	Metallurg Magnitogorsk	KHL	48	4	3	7	2	4	0	0	0	2
2019–20	Stalnye Lisy	MHL	3	1	1	2	2	—	—	—	—	—
2020–21	Chelmet Chelyabinsk	VHL	36	8	9	17	25	—	—	—	—	—
2020–21	Traktor Chelyabinsk	KHL	1	0	0	0	0	—	—	—	—	—
2020–21	Belye Medvedi Chelyabinsk	MHL	2	2	2	4	2	—	—	—	—	—
2020–21	Henderson Silver Knights	AHL	24	9	4	13	8	5	2	0	2	0
2021–22	Vegas Golden Knights	NHL	2	0	0	0	2	—	—	—	—	—
2021–22	Henderson Silver Knights	AHL	63	27	25	52	34	2	1	0	1	4
2022–23	Henderson Silver Knights	AHL	32	9	8	17	30	—	—	—	—	—
2022–23	Vegas Golden Knights	NHL	18	7	2	9	6	—	—	—	—	—
2023–24	Vegas Golden Knights	NHL	47	13	11	24	12	1	0	0	0	0
2024–25	Vegas Golden Knights	NHL	82	35	17	52	30	8	1	1	2	2
2025–26	Vegas Golden Knights	NHL	82	37	27	64	24	22	12	4	16	0
KHL totals			72	5	4	9	6	8	0	0	0	2
NHL totals			231	92	57	149	74	31	13	5	18	2

=== International ===
Medal record

Men's ice hockey

Representing Russia

World Junior Championships
Silver medal – second place	2020 Czech Republic	

Year	Team	Event	Result	GP	G	A	Pts	PIM
2018	Russia	U18	6th	5	2	2	4	2
2020	Russia	WJC	2nd place, silver medalist(s)	7	3	1	4	2
Junior totals				12	5	3	8	4
