= 2025–26 Utah Mammoth season =

National Hockey League season

2025–26 Utah Mammoth
- Division: 4th Central
- Conference: 6th Western
- 2025–26 record: 43–33–6
- Home record: 22–16–3
- Road record: 21–17–3
- Goals for: 268
- Goals against: 240

Team information
- General manager: Bill Armstrong
- Coach: André Tourigny
- Captain: Clayton Keller
- Alternate captains: Lawson Crouse; Alexander Kerfoot; Mikhail Sergachev
- Arena: Delta Center
- Minor league affiliate: Tucson Roadrunners (AHL)

Team leaders
- Goals: Dylan Guenther (40)
- Assists: Clayton Keller (62)
- Points: Clayton Keller (88)
- Penalty minutes: Jack McBain (84)
- Plus/minus: John Marino (+42)
- Wins: Karel Vejmelka (38)
- Goals against average: Karel Vejmelka (2.75)

The 2025–26 Utah Mammoth season was the second season for the National Hockey League (NHL) franchise and their first season under the Mammoth moniker after they played the previous season under the Hockey Club name. They play their home games at the Delta Center, shared with the Utah Jazz of the National Basketball Association (NBA).

On April 9, 2026, the Mammoth clinched a playoff berth for the first time in franchise history, with a 4–1 win over the Nashville Predators and a 6–1 Anaheim Ducks win over the San Jose Sharks. They faced the Vegas Golden Knights in the first round of the playoffs, where they would lose in six games.

== Standings ==
=== Divisional standings ===
Central Division
Pos	Team	GP	W	L	OTL	RW	GF	GA	GD	Pts
1	p – Colorado Avalanche	82	55	16	11	48	302	203	+99	121
2	x – Dallas Stars	82	50	20	12	38	279	226	+53	112
3	x – Minnesota Wild	82	46	24	12	31	272	240	+32	104
4	x – Utah Mammoth	82	43	33	6	33	268	240	+28	92
5	St. Louis Blues	82	37	33	12	33	231	258	−27	86
6	Nashville Predators	82	38	34	10	28	247	269	−22	86
7	Winnipeg Jets	82	35	35	12	28	231	260	−29	82
8	Chicago Blackhawks	82	29	39	14	21	213	275	−62	72

Source: National Hockey League
Rules for classification: 1) Fewer number of games played (GP, only during regular season); 2) Greater number of regulation wins (RW); 3) Greater number of wins in regulation and overtime, excluding shootout wins (ROW); 4) Greater number of total wins, including shootouts (W); 5) Greater number of points earned in head-to-head play; if teams played an uneven number of head-to-head games, the result of the first game on the home ice of the team with the extra home game is discarded; 6) Greater goal differential (GD); 7) Greater number of goals scored (GF)
p – Clinched Presidents' Trophy; x – Clinched playoff spot

=== Conference standings ===
Western Conference Wild Card
Pos	Div	Team	GP	W	L	OTL	RW	GF	GA	GD	Pts
1	CE	x – Utah Mammoth	82	43	33	6	33	268	240	+28	92
2	PA	x – Los Angeles Kings	82	35	27	20	22	225	247	−22	90
3	CE	St. Louis Blues	82	37	33	12	33	231	258	−27	86
4	CE	Nashville Predators	82	38	34	10	28	247	269	−22	86
5	PA	San Jose Sharks	82	39	35	8	27	251	292	−41	86
6	CE	Winnipeg Jets	82	35	35	12	28	231	260	−29	82
7	PA	Seattle Kraken	82	34	37	11	26	226	263	−37	79
8	PA	Calgary Flames	82	34	39	9	27	212	259	−47	77
9	CE	Chicago Blackhawks	82	29	39	14	22	213	275	−62	72
10	PA	Vancouver Canucks	82	25	49	8	15	216	316	−100	58

Source: National Hockey League
Rules for classification: 1) Fewer number of games played (GP, only during regular season); 2) Greater number of regulation wins (RW); 3) Greater number of wins in regulation and overtime, excluding shootout wins (ROW); 4) Greater number of total wins, including shootouts (W); 5) Greater number of points earned in head-to-head play; if teams played an uneven number of head-to-head games, the result of the first game on the home ice of the team with the extra home game is discarded; 6) Greater goal differential (GD); 7) Greater number of goals scored (GF)
x – Clinched playoff spot

== Schedule and results ==
=== Preseason ===
The team's preseason schedule was released on June 20, 2025.

2025 preseason game log: 2–4–1 (Home: 2–1–0; Road: 0–3–1)

#	Date	Visitor	Score	Home	OT	Decision	Location	Attendance	Record
1^{A}	September 21	Colorado	5–1	Utah		Villalta	Magness Arena	N/A	0–1–0
2^{A}	September 21	Utah	2–3	Colorado		Vanecek	Ball Arena	12,689	0–2–0
3	September 22	Utah	1–6	Anaheim		Vejmelka	Honda Center	10,155	0–3–0
4	September 25	Utah	2–3	Vegas	OT	Vanecek	T-Mobile Arena	17,383	0–3–1
5^{B}	September 30	Utah	2–3	Los Angeles		Vejmelka	Idaho Central Arena	N/A	0–4–1
6	October 2	Los Angeles	1–2	Utah		Vanecek	Delta Center	12,478	1–4–1
7	October 4	San Jose	4–6	Utah		Vejmelka	Delta Center	12,478	2–4–1

Legend: Win Loss OT/SO Loss
^{A} – Split Squad
^{B} – Game played in Boise, Idaho; Utah was designated as road team

=== Regular season ===
The Mammoth's regular season schedule was released on July 16, 2025. Attendances at Delta Center are measured by full-view seats only.

2025–26 game log
October: 8–3–0 (Home: 4–0–0; Road: 4–3–0)

#	Date	Visitor	Score	Home	OT	Decision	Location	Attendance	Record	Points	Recap
1	October 9	Utah	1–2	Colorado		Vejmelka	Ball Arena	18,087	0–1–0	0	
2	October 11	Utah	3–2	Nashville	OT	Vejmelka	Bridgestone Arena	17,117	1–1–0	2	
3	October 13	Utah	1–3	Chicago		Vanecek	United Center	15,203	1–2–0	2	
4	October 15	Calgary	1–3	Utah		Vejmelka	Delta Center	12,478	2–2–0	4	
5	October 17	San Jose	3–6	Utah		Vejmelka	Delta Center	12,478	3–2–0	6	
6	October 19	Boston	2–3	Utah		Vanecek	Delta Center	12,478	4–2–0	8	
7	October 21	Colorado	3–4	Utah	OT	Vejmelka	Delta Center	12,478	5–2–0	10	
8	October 23	Utah	7–4	St. Louis		Vejmelka	Enterprise Center	18,096	6–2–0	12	
9	October 25	Utah	6–2	Minnesota		Vejmelka	Grand Casino Arena	18,088	7–2–0	14	
10	October 26	Utah	3–2	Winnipeg		Vanecek	Canada Life Centre	13,678	8–2–0	16	
11	October 28	Utah	3–6	Edmonton		Vejmelka	Rogers Place	18,347	8–3–0	16	

November: 4–8–3 (Home: 3–3–1; Road: 1–5–2)

#	Date	Visitor	Score	Home	OT	Decision	Location	Attendance	Record	Points	Recap
12	November 2	Tampa Bay	4–2	Utah		Vejmelka	Delta Center	12,478	8–4–0	16	
13	November 4	Utah	2–1	Buffalo	OT	Vejmelka	KeyBank Center	16,202	9–4–0	18	
14	November 5	Utah	3–5	Toronto		Vanecek	Scotiabank Arena	18,457	9–5–0	18	
15	November 8	Utah	2–6	Montreal		Vejmelka	Bell Centre	20,962	9–6–0	18	
16	November 9	Utah	2–4	Ottawa		Vanecek	Canadian Tire Centre	17,470	9–7–0	18	
17	November 12	Buffalo	2–5	Utah		Vejmelka	Delta Center	12,478	10–7–0	20	
18	November 14	NY Islanders	3–2	Utah	OT	Vejmelka	Delta Center	12,478	10–7–1	21	
19	November 17	Utah	2–3	Anaheim	OT	Vejmelka	Honda Center	15,177	10–7–2	22	
20	November 18	Utah	2–3	San Jose	OT	Vanecek	SAP Center	12,101	10–7–3	23	
21	November 20	Vegas	4–1	Utah		Vejmelka	Delta Center	12,478	10–8–3	23	
22	November 22	NY Rangers	2–3	Utah		Vejmelka	Delta Center	12,478	11–8–3	25	
23	November 24	Vegas	1–5	Utah		Vejmelka	Delta Center	12,478	12–8–3	27	
24	November 26	Montreal	4–3	Utah		Vejmelka	Delta Center	12,478	12–9–3	27	
25	November 28	Utah	3–4	Dallas		Vanecek	American Airlines Center	18,532	12–10–3	27	
26	November 29	Utah	0–1	St. Louis		Vejmelka	Enterprise Center	16,847	12–11–3	27	

December: 5–8–0 (Home: 2–4–0; Road: 3–4–0)

#	Date	Visitor	Score	Home	OT	Decision	Location	Attendance	Record	Points	Recap
27	December 1	Utah	3–6	San Jose		Vanecek	SAP Center	11,241	12–12–3	27	
28	December 3	Utah	7–0	Anaheim		Vejmelka	Honda Center	12,547	13–12–3	29	
29	December 5	Utah	4–1	Vancouver		Vejmelka	Rogers Arena	18,732	14–12–3	31	
30	December 6	Utah	0–2	Calgary		Vanecek	Scotiabank Saddledome	17,541	14–13–3	31	
31	December 8	Los Angeles	4–2	Utah		Vejmelka	Delta Center	12,478	14–14–3	31	
32	December 10	Florida	4–3	Utah		Vejmelka	Delta Center	12,478	14–15–3	33	
33	December 12	Seattle	3–5	Utah		Vejmelka	Delta Center	12,478	15–15–3	33	
34	December 14	Utah	5–4	Pittsburgh	OT	Vejmelka	PPG Paints Arena	15,686	16–15–3	35	
35	December 16	Utah	1–4	Boston		Vanecek	TD Garden	17,850	16–16–3	35	
36	December 17	Utah	4–1	Detroit		Vejmelka	Little Caesars Arena	19,515	17–16–3	37	
37	December 19	New Jersey	2–1	Utah		Vejmelka	Delta Center	12,478	17–17–3	37	
38	December 21	Winnipeg	3–4	Utah	OT	Vejmelka	Delta Center	12,478	18–17–3	39	
39	December 23	Utah	0–1	Colorado		Vanecek	Ball Arena	18,127	18–18–3	39	
40	December 29	Nashville	4–3	Utah		Vanecek	Delta Center	12,478	18–19–3	39	

January: 10–4–1 (Home: 6–1–1; Road: 4–3–0)

#	Date	Visitor	Score	Home	OT	Decision	Location	Attendance	Record	Points	Recap
41	January 1	Utah	7–2	NY Islanders		Vejmelka	UBS Arena	17,255	19–19–3	41	
42	January 3	Utah	1–4	New Jersey		Vejmelka	Prudential Center	16,928	19–20–3	41	
43	January 5	Utah	3–2	NY Rangers	OT	Vejmelka	Madison Square Garden	17,503	20–20–3	43	
44	January 7	Ottawa	1–3	Utah		Vejmelka	Delta Center	12,478	21–20–3	45	
45	January 9	St. Louis	2–4	Utah		Vejmelka	Delta Center	12,478	22–20–3	47	
46	January 11	Columbus	3–2	Utah	OT	Vanecek	Delta Center	12,478	22–20–4	48	
47	January 13	Toronto	1–6	Utah		Vejmelka	Delta Center	12,478	23–20–4	50	
48	January 15	Dallas	1–2	Utah		Vejmelka	Delta Center	12,478	24–20–4	52	
49	January 17	Seattle	3–6	Utah		Vejmelka	Delta Center	12,478	25–20–4	54	
50	January 21	Philadelphia	4–5	Utah	OT	Vejmelka	Delta Center	12,478	26–20–4	56	
51	January 24	Utah	5–2	Nashville		Vejmelka	Bridgestone Arena	17,159	27–20–4	58	
52	January 26	Utah	0–2	Tampa Bay		Vejmelka	Benchmark International Arena	19,096	27–21–4	58	
53	January 27	Utah	4–3	Florida		Vanecek	Amerant Bank Arena	20,073	28–21–4	60	
54	January 29	Utah	4–5	Carolina		Vejmelka	Lenovo Center	18,302	28–22–4	60	
55	January 31	Dallas	3–2	Utah		Vejmelka	Delta Center	12,478	28–23–4	60	

February: 3–1–0 (Home: 3–1–0; Road: 0–0–0)

#	Date	Visitor	Score	Home	OT	Decision	Location	Attendance	Record	Points	Recap
56	February 2	Vancouver	2–6	Utah		Vejmelka	Delta Center	12,478	29–23–4	62	
57	February 4	Detroit	1–4	Utah		Vejmelka	Delta Center	12,478	30–23–4	64	
58	February 25	Colorado	4–2	Utah		Vejmelka	Delta Center	12,478	30–24–4	64	
59	February 27	Minnesota	2–5	Utah		Vejmelka	Delta Center	12,478	31–24–4	66	

March: 7–6–2 (Home: 1–5–1; Road: 6–1–1)

#	Date	Visitor	Score	Home	OT	Decision	Location	Attendance	Record	Points	Recap
60	March 1	Chicago	4–0	Utah		Vejmelka	Delta Center	12,478	31–25–4	66	
61	March 3	Utah	3–2	Washington		Vejmelka	Capital One Arena	17,387	32–25–4	68	
62	March 5	Utah	3–0	Philadelphia		Vanecek	Xfinity Mobile Arena	19,386	33–25–4	70	
63	March 7	Utah	5–4	Columbus	OT	Vejmelka	Nationwide Arena	18,668	34–25–4	72	
64	March 9	Utah	2–3	Chicago	OT	Vanecek	United Center	18,320	34–25–5	73	
65	March 10	Utah	0–5	Minnesota		Vejmelka	Grand Casino Arena	18,078	34–26–5	73	
66	March 12	Chicago	3–2	Utah	OT	Vejmelka	Delta Center	12,478	34–26–6	74	
67	March 14	Pittsburgh	4–3	Utah		Vejmelka	Delta Center	12,478	34–27–6	74	
68	March 16	Utah	6–3	Dallas		Vanecek	American Airlines Center	18,532	35–27–6	76	
69	March 19	Utah	4–0	Vegas		Vejmelka	T-Mobile Arena	17,875	36–27–6	78	
70	March 20	Anaheim	4–1	Utah		Vanecek	Delta Center	12,478	36–28–6	78	
71	March 22	Los Angeles	3–4	Utah	OT	Vejmelka	Delta Center	12,478	37–28–6	80	
72	March 24	Edmonton	5–2	Utah		Vejmelka	Delta Center	12,478	37–29–6	80	
73	March 26	Washington	7–4	Utah		Vanecek	Delta Center	12,478	37–30–6	80	
74	March 28	Utah	6–2	Los Angeles		Vejmelka	Crypto.com Arena	18,145	38–30–6	82	

April: 5–3–0 (Home: 3–2–0; Road: 2–1–0)

#	Date	Visitor	Score	Home	OT	Decision	Location	Attendance	Record	Points	Recap
75	April 2	Utah	6–2	Seattle		Vejmelka	Climate Pledge Arena	17,151	39–30–6	84	
76	April 4	Utah	7–4	Vancouver		Vejmelka	Rogers Arena	18,693	40–30–6	86	
77	April 7	Edmonton	5–6	Utah	OT	Vejmelka	Delta Center	12,478	41–30–6	88	
78	April 9	Nashville	1–4	Utah		Vejmelka	Delta Center	12,478	42–30–6	90	
79	April 11	Carolina	4–1	Utah		Vejmelka	Delta Center	12,478	42–31–6	90	
80	April 12	Utah	1–4	Calgary		Vanecek	Scotiabank Saddledome	17,575	42–32–6	90	
81	April 14	Winnipeg	3–5	Utah		Vejmelka	Delta Center	12,478	43–32–6	92	
82	April 16	St. Louis	5–3	Utah		Vejmelka	Delta Center	12,478	43–33–6	92	

Win (2 points) Loss (0 points) OT/SO Loss (1 point)

=== Playoffs ===
2026 Stanley Cup playoffs
Western Conference first round vs. (P1) Vegas Golden Knights: Vegas won 4–2

#	Date	Visitor	Score	Home	OT	Decision	Location	Attendance	Series	Recap
1	April 19	Utah	2–4	Vegas		Vejmelka	T-Mobile Arena	17,979	0–1	
2	April 21	Utah	3–2	Vegas		Vejmelka	T-Mobile Arena	17,871	1–1	
3	April 24	Vegas	2–4	Utah		Vejmelka	Delta Center	12,478	2–1	
4	April 27	Vegas	5–4	Utah	OT	Vejmelka	Delta Center	12,478	2–2	
5	April 29	Utah	4–5	Vegas	2OT	Vejmelka	T-Mobile Arena	18,033	2–3	
6	May 1	Vegas	5–1	Utah		Vejmelka	Delta Center	12,478	2–4	

Legend: Win Loss

== Players statistics ==
=== Skaters ===
Regular season
Player	GP	G	A	Pts	+/−	PIM
Clayton Keller	82	26	62	88	+21	38
Nick Schmaltz	82	33	41	74	+17	28
Dylan Guenther	79	40	33	73	+7	28
Mikhail Sergachev	78	10	49	59	+2	44
JJ Peterka	82	25	22	47	+6	28
Lawson Crouse	81	24	20	44	+20	46
Logan Cooley	54	24	19	43	+3	28
John Marino	80	4	32	36	+42	16
Michael Carcone	79	16	15	31	+4	22
Sean Durzi	60	5	22	27	−12	50
Barrett Hayton	67	10	15	25	+3	54
Jack McBain	75	9	16	25	+11	84
Ian Cole	82	3	20	23	+16	50
Kailer Yamamoto	59	13	10	23	+11	14
Nate Schmidt	82	5	17	22	+31	22
Kevin Stenlund	80	4	14	18	−9	24
Alexander Kerfoot	34	7	6	13	0	23
Nick DeSimone	40	2	6	8	+5	10
Daniil But	29	3	4	7	+1	8
MacKenzie Weegar^{†}	19	1	6	7	+2	19
Liam O'Brien	38	3	1	4	−6	43
Brandon Tanev	56	0	3	3	−15	50
Kevin Rooney	1	1	0	1	+1	0
Olli Määttä^{‡}	22	0	1	1	−5	2
Maveric Lamoureux	5	0	1	1	+4	2
Dmitri Simashev	28	0	1	1	−11	23
Andrew Agozzino	2	0	0	0	0	0

Playoffs
Player	GP	G	A	Pts	+/−	PIM
Lawson Crouse	6	3	2	5	−1	2
Dylan Guenther	6	3	2	5	0	2
MacKenzie Weegar	6	2	3	5	+2	2
Clayton Keller	6	1	4	5	+1	0
Kailer Yamamoto	6	1	4	5	+2	2
Mikhail Sergachev	6	0	5	5	0	4
Nick Schmaltz	6	1	3	4	−1	2
Logan Cooley	6	2	1	3	+2	10
Michael Carcone	6	2	0	2	−1	2
Ian Cole	6	1	1	2	−2	4
Sean Durzi	6	0	2	2	−2	4
John Marino	6	1	0	1	0	0
Kevin Stenlund	6	1	0	1	−3	2
Alexander Kerfoot	6	0	1	1	−3	6
Liam O'Brien	3	0	1	1	+1	2
Nate Schmidt	6	0	1	1	+2	2
Brandon Tanev	6	0	0	0	−3	4
Barrett Hayton	1	0	0	0	−1	0
Jack McBain	2	0	0	0	−1	0
JJ Peterka	6	0	0	0	−3	2

=== Goaltenders ===
Regular season
Player	GP	GS	TOI	W	L	OT	GA	GAA	SA	SV%	SO	G	A	PIM
Karel Vejmelka	64	63	3,692:45	38	20	3	169	2.75	1,626	.897	2	0	2	2
Vítek Vaněček	22	19	1,206:15	5	13	3	59	2.93	506	.883	1	0	1	0

Playoffs
Player	GP	GS	TOI	W	L	GA	GAA	SA	SV%	SO	G	A	PIM
Karel Vejmelka	6	6	402:05	2	4	21	3.13	182	.885	0	0	0	0

^{†}Denotes player spent time with another team before joining Utah. Stats reflect time with Utah only.
^{‡}Denotes player was traded or waived mid-season. Stats reflect time with Utah only.

== Transactions ==
The Mammoth have been involved in the following transactions during the 2025–26 season.

Key:

† Contract is entry-level.
‡ Contract initially takes effect in the 2026–27 season.

=== Trades ===
Date	Details		Ref
June 28, 2025	To Nashville Predators 6th-round pick in 2026	To Utah Mammoth COL 6th-round pick in 2025 (#182 overall)	
June 30, 2025	To Toronto Maple Leafs Matias Maccelli	To Utah Mammoth Conditional 3rd-round pick in 2027 (Note: Utah will receive a 2nd-round pick in 2029 if the Maple Leafs qualify for the playoffs and Maccelli records at least 51 points this season, otherwise Utah will receive a 3rd-round pick in 2027.)	
October 1, 2025	To Edmonton Oilers Connor Ingram	To Utah Mammoth Future considerations	
January 5, 2026	To Carolina Hurricanes Juuso Välimäki	To Utah Mammoth Future considerations	
March 4, 2026	To Calgary Flames Jonathan Castagna; Olli Määttä; NYR 2nd-round pick in 2026; OTT 2nd-round pick in 2026; UTA 2nd-round pick in 2026	To Utah Mammoth MacKenzie Weegar	

=== Players acquired ===
Date	Player	Former team	Term	Via	Ref
July 1, 2025	Scott Perunovich	New York Islanders	1-year	Free agency	
July 1, 2025	Nate Schmidt	Florida Panthers	3-year	Free agency	
July 1, 2025	Brandon Tanev	Winnipeg Jets	3-year	Free agency	
July 1, 2025	Vítek Vaněček	Florida Panthers	1-year	Free agency	
October 6, 2025	Kevin Rooney	Calgary Flames	1-year	Free agency	

=== Players lost ===
Date	Player	New team	Term	Via	Ref
July 1, 2025	Nick Bjugstad	St. Louis Blues	2-year	Free agency	

=== Signings ===
Date	Player	Term	Ref
July 1, 2025	Kailer Yamamoto	1-year	
July 7, 2025	Jack McBain	5-year	
July 15, 2025	Michael Carcone	1-year	
October 29, 2025	Logan Cooley	8-year‡	
March 11, 2026	Nick Schmaltz	8-year‡	
March 23, 2026	Caleb Desnoyers	3-year†‡	
March 25, 2026	Michael Hrabal	3-year†‡	

== Draft picks ==
Below are the Utah Mammoth's selection at the 2025 NHL entry draft, which was held on June 27 and 28, 2025, at the Peacock Theater in Los Angeles, California

Utah Mammoth 2025 NHL entry draft picks
Round	#	Player	Pos	Nationality	College/Junior/Club team	League
1	4	Caleb Desnoyers	C	Canada	Moncton Wildcats	QMJHL
2	46	Max Pšenička	D	Czech Republic	Portland Winterhawks	WHL
3	78	Štěpán Hoch	LW	Czech Republic	HC Motor České Budějovice U20	Czechia U20
4	110	Yegor Borikov	RW	Belarus	HC Dinamo Minsk	KHL
5	142	Ivan Tkach-Tkachenko	G	Russia	Tolpar Ufa	MHL
6	174	Ludvig Johnson	D	Switzerland	EV Zug	National League
6	182 (Note: The Colorado Avalanche's sixth-round pick went to the Utah Mammoth as the result of a trade on June 28, 2025, that sent a sixth-round pick in 2026 to Nashville in exchange for this pick.)	Reko Alanko	D	Finland	Jokerit U18	U18 SM-sarja
