= Karel Vejmelka =

Czech ice hockey player (born 1996)

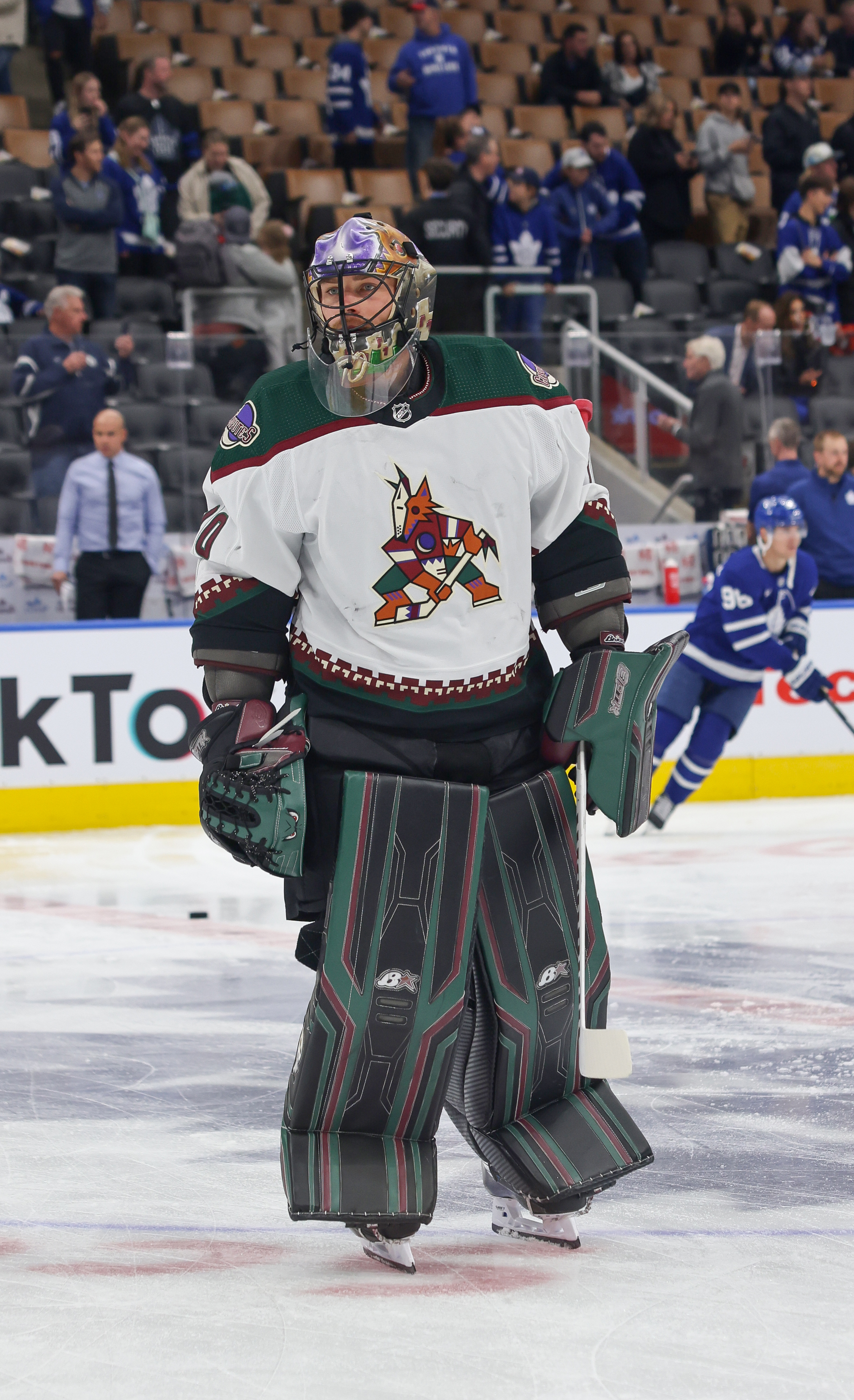
- Vejmelka with the Arizona Coyotes in 2022
- Born: 25 May 1996 (age 30) Třebíč, Czech Republic
- Height: 6 ft 4 in (193 cm)
- Weight: 203 lb (92 kg; 14 st 7 lb)
- Position: Goaltender
- Catches: Right
- NHL team Former teams: Utah Mammoth; HC Dynamo Pardubice; HC Kometa Brno; HC Dukla Jihlava; Arizona Coyotes
- National team: Czech Republic
- NHL draft: 145th overall, 2015; Nashville Predators
- Playing career: 2014–present

Karel Vejmelka (born 25 May 1996) is a Czech professional ice hockey player who is a goaltender for the Utah Mammoth of the National Hockey League (NHL). Vejmelka, who started his career in the Czech Extraliga, was selected by the Nashville Predators in the fifth round (145th overall) of the 2015 NHL entry draft.

== Playing career ==
Vejmelka made his Czech Extraliga (ELH) debut playing with HC Pardubice (later Dynamo Pardubice) during the 2014–15 Czech Extraliga season. He was selected by the Nashville Predators of the National Hockey League (NHL) in the fifth round, 145th overall, of the 2015 NHL entry draft.

During the 2015–16 season, after making just a solitary appearance for Dynamo, Vejmelka transferred his contract to fellow ELH club, HC Kometa Brno, on 28 November 2015.

With a shortened loan to HC Dukla Jihlava, Vejmelka, un-signed by the Predators, played the next five seasons with HC Kometa Brno before he was signed as a free agent to a one-year entry-level contract with the Arizona Coyotes of the NHL on 5 May 2021.

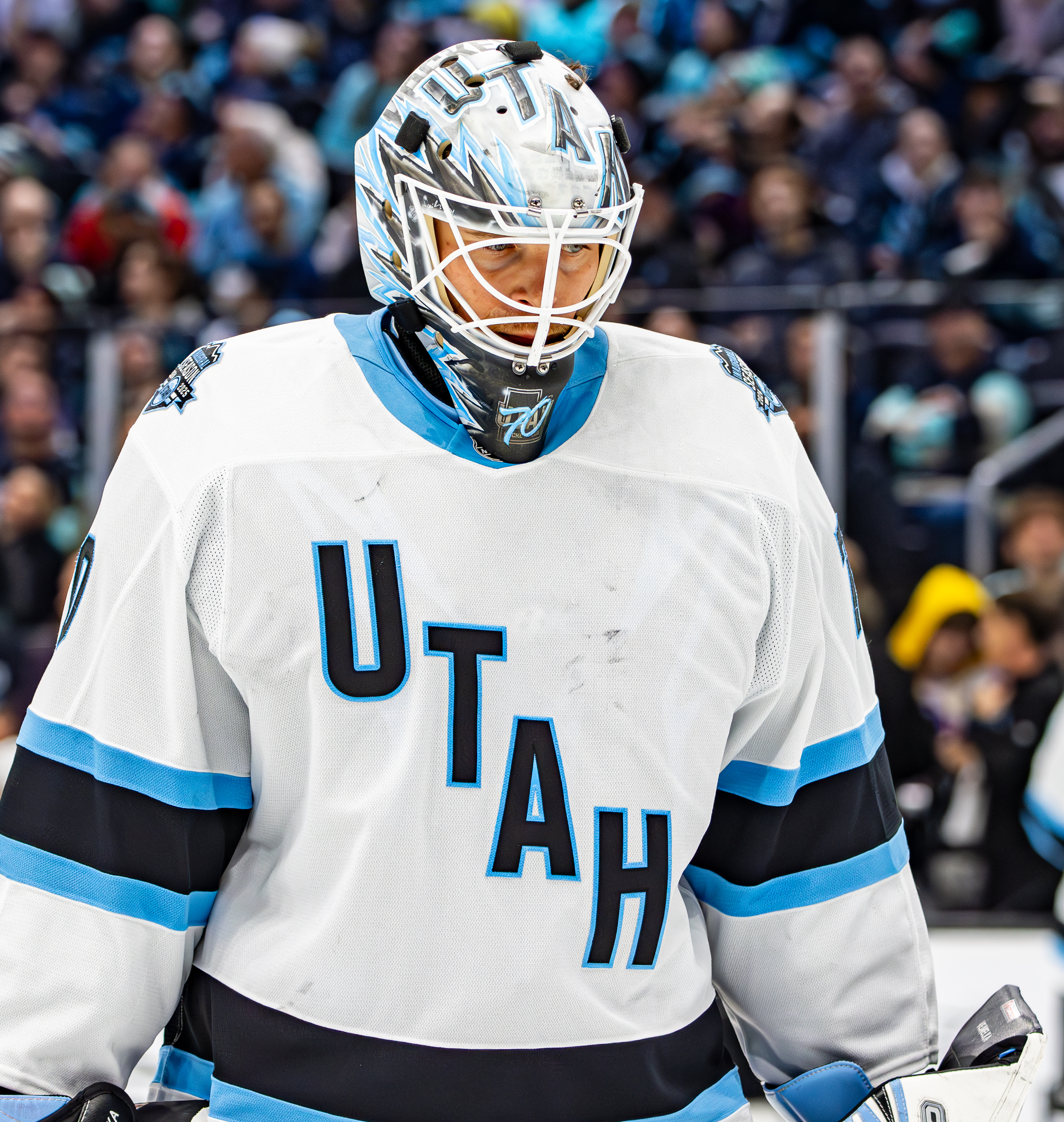
Vejmelka with the Utah Hockey Club in 2024

In his debut North American season, Vejmelka earned a roster spot with the Coyotes to begin the 2021–22 season. He made his NHL debut with the Coyotes, stopping 32 of 33 shot attempts in a 2–1 shootout loss to the Buffalo Sabres on 17 October 2021. With injury to initial starting goaltender Carter Hutton, Vejmelka assumed a larger role and established himself in the league. On 21 March 2022, the Coyotes signed Vejmelka to a three-year, $8.175 million contract extension that carries a $2.725 million cap hit. Vejmelka holds the NHL record for the shortest time that a starting goaltender has spent on the ice before being pulled to the bench - 59 seconds against the Seattle Kraken on 6 November 2021.

Shortly after the end of the 2023–24 regular season, the Coyotes' franchise was suspended and team assets were subsequently transferred to the expansion Utah Mammoth; as a result, Vejmelka became a member of the Utah team.

Vejmelka established himself as the starting goaltender in his first season in Utah, leading him to earn a five-year, $23.75 million extension on 6 March 2025.

During the 2025–26 Utah Mammoth season, Vejmelka was the first goalie to reach 30 wins and recorded more time on ice than any other player. He also finished the season with the second most wins, shots against, and saves.

== International play ==
Medal record

Representing Czech Republic

Men's ice hockey

World Championships
Gold medal – first place	2024 Czech Republic	
Bronze medal – third place	2022 Finland	

Vejmelka represented Czechia at the 2024 IIHF World Championship and won a gold medal.

== Career statistics ==
=== Regular season and playoffs ===
			Regular season									Playoffs
Season	Team	League	GP	W	L	OT	MIN	GA	SO	GAA	SV%	GP	W	L	MIN	GA	SO	GAA	SV%
2013–14	HC Dynamo Pardubice	Czech.20	36	16	20	0	2053	88	1	2.57	.930	—	—	—	—	—	—	—	—
2014–15	HC Dynamo Pardubice	Czech.20	37	21	16	0	2222	94	2	2.54	.928	—	—	—	—	—	—	—	—
2014–15	HC Dynamo Pardubice	ELH	7	4	3	0	419	20	0	2.86	.923	6	3	3	338	17	1	3.02	.916
2014–15	SK Horácká Slavia Třebíč	Czech.1	3	1	2	0	176	4	0	1.36	.953	—	—	—	—	—	—	—	—
2015–16	HC Dynamo Pardubice	ELH	1	0	1	0	44	1	0	1.36	.933	—	—	—	—	—	—	—	—
2015–16	HC Kometa Brno	ELH	5	2	3	0	163	4	1	1.47	.941	—	—	—	—	—	—	—	—
2015–16	SK Horácká Slavia Třebíč	Czech.1	42	21	21	0	2425	106	0	2.62	.920	—	—	—	—	—	—	—	—
2016–17	HC Kometa Brno	ELH	31	14	17	0	1729	72	3	2.50	.905	—	—	—	—	—	—	—	—
2016–17	SK Horácká Slavia Třebíč	Czech.1	10	6	4	0	595	23	1	2.32	.929	—	—	—	—	—	—	—	—
2017–18	HC Kometa Brno	ELH	6	3	3	0	364	11	2	1.81	.937	—	—	—	—	—	—	—	—
2017–18	HC Dukla Jihlava	ELH	4	0	4	0	240	10	0	2.50	.901	—	—	—	—	—	—	—	—
2017–18	SK Horácká Slavia Třebíč	Czech.1	14	7	7	0	803	31	2	2.32	.908	—	—	—	—	—	—	—	—
2018–19	HC Kometa Brno	ELH	31	17	14	0	1762	70	1	2.38	.915	—	—	—	—	—	—	—	—
2018–19	SK Horácká Slavia Třebíč	Czech.1	10	6	4	0	616	21	1	2.05	.925	—	—	—	—	—	—	—	—
2019–20	HC Kometa Brno	ELH	43	22	19	0	2414	109	3	2.71	.911	—	—	—	—	—	—	—	—
2020–21	HC Kometa Brno	ELH	35	14	21	0	2020	94	3	2.79	.911	8	3	5	451	18	0	2.39	.910
2021–22	Arizona Coyotes	NHL	52	13	32	3	2773	170	1	3.68	.898	—	—	—	—	—	—	—	—
2022–23	Arizona Coyotes	NHL	50	18	24	6	2941	168	3	3.43	.900	—	—	—	—	—	—	—	—
2023–24	Arizona Coyotes	NHL	38	13	19	2	2040	112	1	3.29	.897	—	—	—	—	—	—	—	—
2024–25	Utah Hockey Club	NHL	58	26	22	8	3368	145	1	2.58	.904	—	—	—	—	—	—	—	—
2025–26	Utah Mammoth	NHL	64	38	20	3	3693	169	2	2.75	.897	6	2	4	402	21	0	3.13	.885
ELH totals			163	77	84	0	9,155	391	13	2.56	.913	14	6	8	789	35	1	2.66	.913
NHL totals			262	108	117	22	14,815	764	8	3.10	.899	6	2	4	402	21	0	3.13	.885

=== International ===
Year	Team	Event	Result	GP	W	L	MIN	GA	SO	GAA	SV%
2022	Czechia	WC	3rd place, bronze medalist(s)	8	5	3	413	17	1	2.46	.896
2023	Czechia	WC	8th	4	2	2	236	7	1	1.78	.944
2025	Czechia	WC	6th	5	3	2	262	13	0	2.98	.902
Senior totals				17	10	7	911	37	2	2.44	.912
