= Michael Carcone =

Canadian ice hockey player (born 1996)

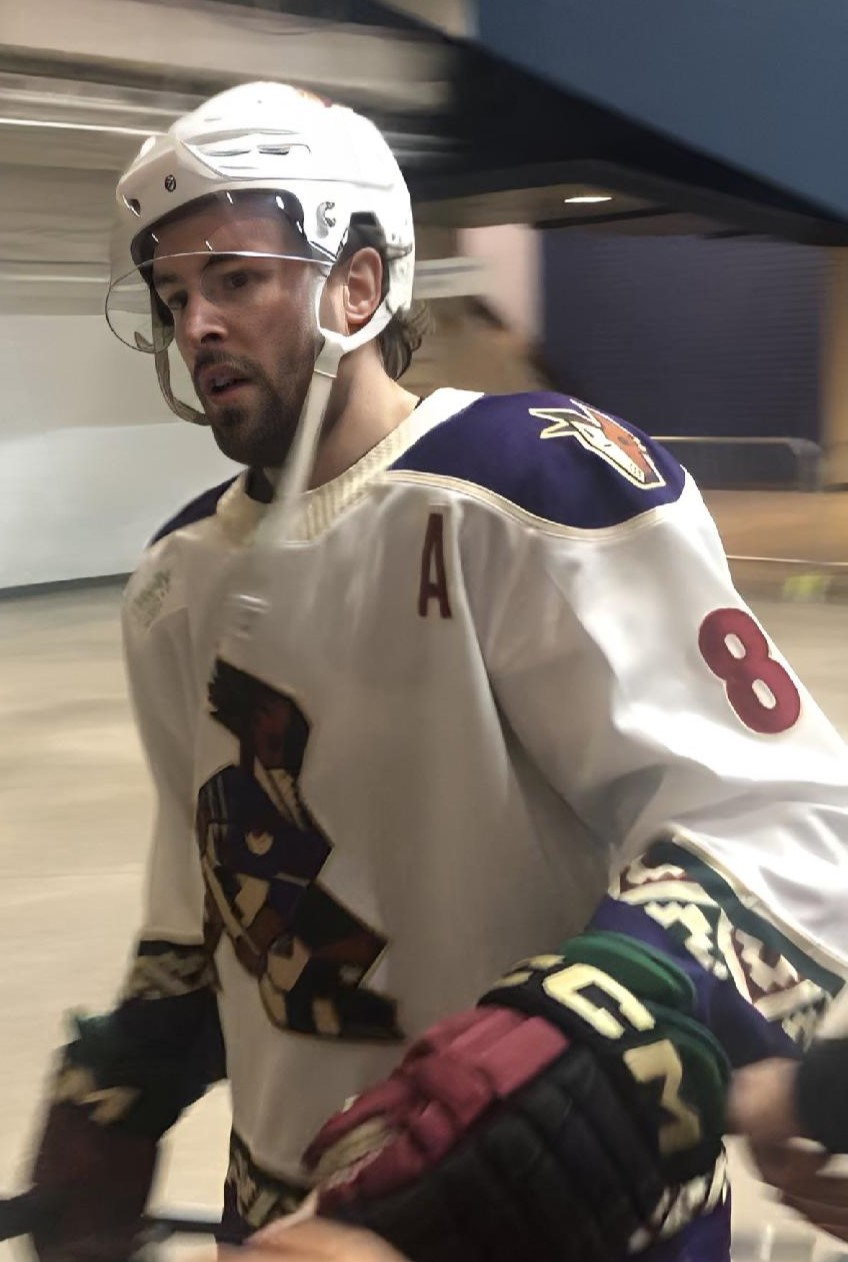
- Carcone with the Tucson Roadrunners in 2023
- Born: May 19, 1996 (age 30) Ajax, Ontario, Canada
- Height: 5 ft 9 in (175 cm)
- Weight: 170 lb (77 kg; 12 st 2 lb)
- Position: Forward
- Shoots: Left
- NHL team Former teams: Utah Mammoth; Arizona Coyotes
- National team: Canada
- NHL draft: Undrafted
- Playing career: 2016–present

Michael Carcone (born May 19, 1996) is a Canadian professional ice hockey player who is a forward for the Utah Mammoth of the National Hockey League (NHL). Undrafted, Carcone began his professional career in the American Hockey League (AHL) affiliates of NHL organizations including the Vancouver Canucks, Toronto Maple Leafs, Ottawa Senators, and Arizona Coyotes.

Carcone joined the Coyotes organization, and made his NHL debut in late 2021. Playing between the AHL and NHL, he led the AHL in scoring during the 2022–23 season.

== Early life ==
Carcone was born on May 19, 1996, in Ajax, Ontario, Canada. He was born into an athletic family as both of his older brothers played ice hockey growing up. Although his father did not play sports, he owned multiple small glass companies, while his grandfather owned a bar and a pizza restaurant.

== Playing career ==
Growing up in Ajax, Carcone played for the Ajax-Pickering Raiders and The Hill Academy before joining the Stouffville Spirit in the Ontario Junior Hockey League (OJHL). Upon joining the Spirit, Carcone tallied 12 goals and 25 assists through 49 games. As such, he was drafted in the 12th round, 196th overall, by the Sioux Falls Stampede in the 2014 United States Hockey League Draft. Despite this, Carcone returned to the Spirit where a scout from the Quebec Major Junior Hockey League (QMJHL) saw him play and convinced the Drummondville Voltigeurs to sign him to a major junior contract.

Upon joining the Voltigeurs, the coaching staff encouraged Carcone to improve his nutrition and work on getting stronger. He experienced numerous setbacks during his rookie season including a broken thumb and two concussions which caused him to miss six weeks. He also struggled with the language barrier as he did not speak French. Carcone subsequently finished the 2015–16 season with 12 goals and 29 assists for 41 points through 50 games. He improved offensively during his sophomore season with the team and increased his point total to 89 through 66 games. By November 2015, Carcone had scored 17 goals in 20 games to lead the league in scoring. His 89 points through 66 games tied him for the team lead in points, while he finished first in goals and second in assists.

=== Professional ===
After remaining undrafted into the National Hockey League (NHL), Carcone signed a three-year, entry-level contract as an undrafted free agent with the Vancouver Canucks on July 16, 2016. Following the signing, Carcone joined the Canucks for their pre-season games before being assigned to their American Hockey League (AHL) affiliate, the Utica Comets, for the 2016–17 season. As one of the youngest players on the team, Carcone made his professional debut on October 15. He finished his rookie season with five goals and 13 assists for 18 points through 61 games. Carcone returned to the Canucks organization for the 2017–18 season and attended their summer Development Camp.

Showing offensive capabilities, Carcone was a regular top six forward with the Comets, before he was traded during the 2018–19 season by the Canucks to the Toronto Maple Leafs in exchange for Josh Leivo on December 4, 2018. He was assigned to the Maple Leafs' AHL affiliate, the Toronto Marlies, and posted a combined best of 44 points through 62 regular season games.

As a pending restricted free agent with the Maple Leafs in the following off-season, Carcone was traded for the second time in his career, joining the Ottawa Senators in a six-player trade on July 1, 2019. He was then signed to a two-year, two-way contract with the Senators on July 16. In the 2019–20 season, after attending the Senators' training camp, Carcone was assigned to the Belleville Senators of the AHL for the duration of the pandemic affected and shortened campaign posting 27 points in 59 games.

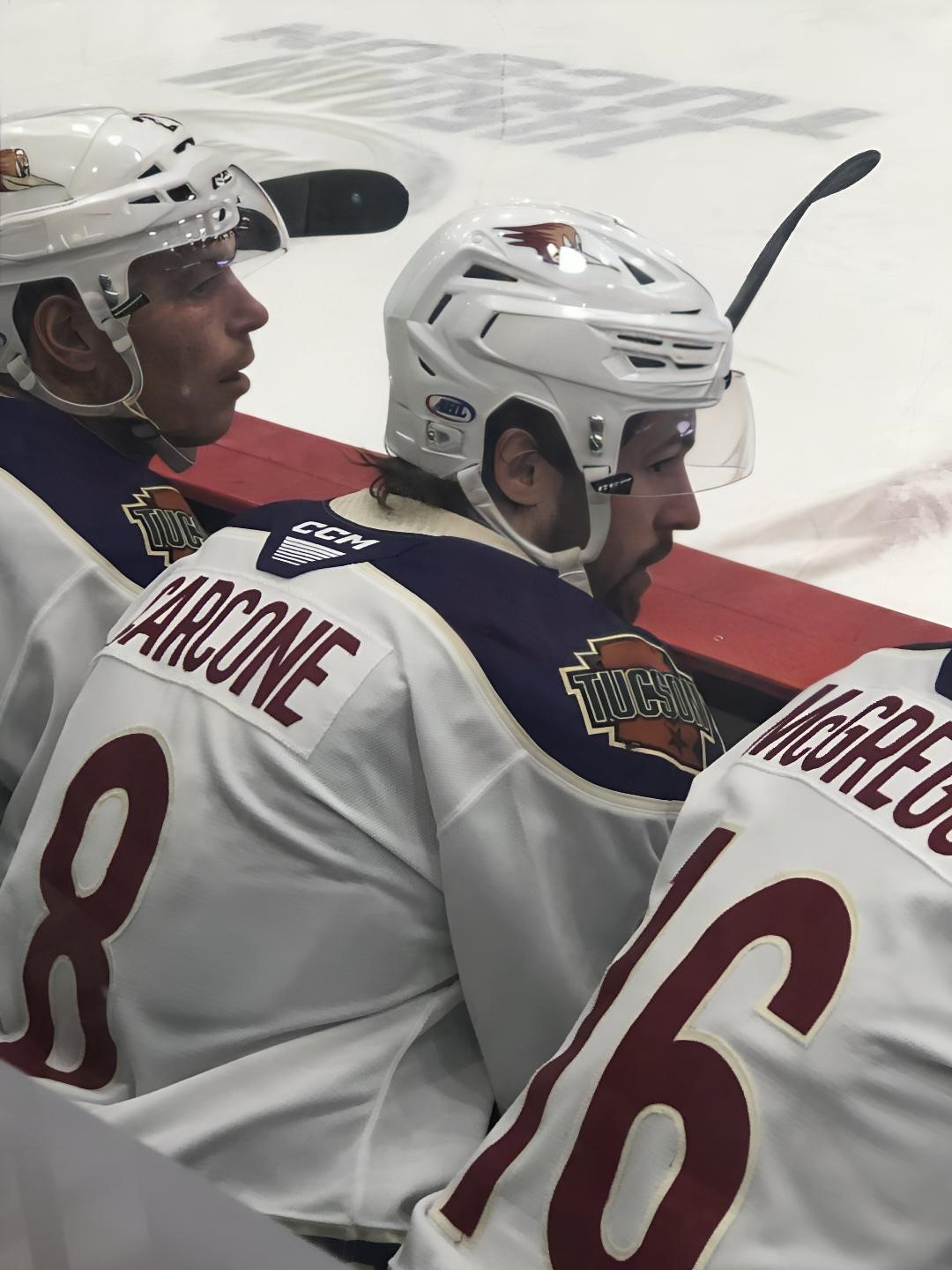
Carcone with the Roadrunners in 2023

Approaching the pandemic-delayed 2020–21 season, Carcone was traded by the Senators to the Nashville Predators in exchange for Zach Magwood on December 21, 2020. With the Predators' AHL affiliate, the Milwaukee Admirals, going on hiatus for the COVID-19 affected season, Carcone was loaned for the season to fellow AHL team, the Tucson Roadrunners, the primary affiliate of the Arizona Coyotes, on February 5, 2021. Carcone led the Roadrunners with 15 goals, and contributed with 25 points, placing second on the team in 35 regular season games.

As an unrestricted free agent from the Predators in the off-season, Carcone following his impressive tenure with the Roadrunners was signed to a two-year, two-way contract with the Arizona Coyotes on July 28, 2021. Carcone continued his tenure with the Roadrunners to begin the 2021–22 season. Recording 12 points through 21 games, Carcone received his first recall to the NHL on December 28. He made his long-awaited NHL debut the same day, appearing on the fourth line for the Coyotes in a 8–7 shootout loss to the San Jose Sharks. He was then returned to the Roadrunners the following day. He scored his first NHL goal later in the season, on March 25, 2022, against Jacob Markström in a 4–2 loss to the Calgary Flames. He finished the season with four goals and two assists in 21 games with Arizona.

During the 2022–23 season Carcone led the AHL in scoring and claimed the John B. Sollenberger Trophy with 85 points through 64 regular season games. He also played in nine games with the Coyotes, recording two goals and one assist for three points. Carcone also played in the 2023 AHL All-Star Classic. On June 21, 2023, Carcone elected to continue his tenure with the Coyotes by signing a two-year, $1.55 million contract extension.

Shortly after the end of the 2023–24 regular season, the Coyotes' franchise was suspended and its hockey assets were subsequently transferred to the expansion Utah Mammoth; as a result, Carcone became a member of the Utah team. On September 22, 2024, Carcone scored the first preseason goal in franchise history in a 5–3 win over the St. Louis Blues. On July 15, 2025, Carcone signed a 1 year, $775K contract to stay with Utah. The next year, Carcone signed a two-year, $3.5M contract extension with the team, keeping him under contract through the 2027-28 NHL Season.

== International play ==
Medal record

Representing Canada

Ice hockey

World Championships
Gold medal – first place	2023 Finland/Latvia	

On May 5, 2023, Carcone was named to Canada national team for the 2023 IIHF World Championship where he recorded three goals and three assists in 10 games and won a gold medal.

== Career statistics ==
=== Regular season and playoffs ===
			Regular season					Playoffs
Season	Team	League	GP	G	A	Pts	PIM	GP	G	A	Pts	PIM
2013–14	Stouffville Spirit	OJHL	49	12	25	37	44	—	—	—	—	—
2014–15	Drummondville Voltigeurs	QMJHL	50	12	29	41	32	—	—	—	—	—
2015–16	Drummondville Voltigeurs	QMJHL	66	47	42	89	80	3	0	0	0	12
2016–17	Utica Comets	AHL	61	5	13	18	31	—	—	—	—	—
2017–18	Utica Comets	AHL	68	15	12	27	71	5	1	3	4	4
2018–19	Utica Comets	AHL	20	6	11	17	6	—	—	—	—	—
2018–19	Toronto Marlies	AHL	42	14	13	27	39	13	6	4	10	8
2019–20	Belleville Senators	AHL	59	13	14	27	64	—	—	—	—	—
2020–21	Tucson Roadrunners	AHL	35	15	10	25	18	1	0	0	0	4
2021–22	Tucson Roadrunners	AHL	48	24	17	41	62	—	—	—	—	—
2021–22	Arizona Coyotes	NHL	21	4	2	6	14	—	—	—	—	—
2022–23	Tucson Roadrunners	AHL	65	31	54	85	127	3	2	2	4	0
2022–23	Arizona Coyotes	NHL	9	2	1	3	2	—	—	—	—	—
2023–24	Arizona Coyotes	NHL	74	21	8	29	35	—	—	—	—	—
2024–25	Utah Hockey Club	NHL	53	7	12	19	36	—	—	—	—	—
2025–26	Utah Mammoth	NHL	79	16	15	31	22	6	2	0	2	2
NHL totals			236	50	38	88	109	6	2	0	2	2

=== International ===
Year	Team	Event	Result	GP	G	A	Pts	PIM
2023	Canada	WC	1st place, gold medalist(s)	10	3	3	6	0
Senior totals				10	3	3	6	0

== Awards and honours ==
Awards	Year	Ref
AHL
All-Star Game	2023	
John B. Sollenberger Trophy	2023	
First All-Star Team	2023	
