= 2025–26 Pittsburgh Penguins season =

National Hockey League season

2025–26 Pittsburgh Penguins
- Division: 2nd Metropolitan
- Conference: 7th Eastern
- 2025–26 record: 41–25–16
- Home record: 20–13–8
- Road record: 21–11–8
- Goals for: 288
- Goals against: 261

Team information
- General manager: Kyle Dubas
- Coach: Dan Muse
- Captain: Sidney Crosby
- Alternate captains: Kris Letang; Evgeni Malkin
- Arena: PPG Paints Arena
- Minor league affiliates: Wilkes-Barre/Scranton Penguins (AHL); Wheeling Nailers (ECHL)

Team leaders
- Goals: Anthony Mantha (31)
- Assists: Erik Karlsson (51)
- Points: Sidney Crosby (74)
- Penalty minutes: Evgeni Malkin (61)
- Plus/minus: Ryan Shea (+27)
- Wins: Stuart Skinner (23)
- Goals against average: Sergei Murashov (2.56)

The 2025–26 Pittsburgh Penguins season was the 59th season (58th season of play) for the National Hockey League (NHL) franchise that was established on June 5, 1967.

On April 9, 2026, the Penguins clinched a spot in the Stanley Cup playoffs with a 5–2 victory over the New Jersey Devils, qualifying for the playoffs for the first time since the 2021–22 season. In the first round, they faced their interstate rival Philadelphia Flyers, and despite falling into a 3–0 series deficit, the Penguins would win the next two games, but their effort would ultimately fall short as they lost game 6 in overtime.

== Off-season ==
On June 4, 2025, Dan Muse was named head coach of the NHL's Pittsburgh Penguins, succeeding Mike Sullivan as the 23rd head coach in franchise history.

== Standings ==
=== Divisional standings ===
Metropolitan Division
Pos	Team	GP	W	L	OTL	RW	GF	GA	GD	Pts
1	z – Carolina Hurricanes	82	53	22	7	39	296	240	+56	113
2	x – Pittsburgh Penguins	82	41	25	16	34	293	268	+25	98
3	x – Philadelphia Flyers	82	43	27	12	27	250	243	+7	98
4	Washington Capitals	82	43	30	9	37	263	244	+19	95
5	Columbus Blue Jackets	82	40	30	12	28	253	253	0	92
6	New York Islanders	82	43	34	5	29	233	241	−8	91
7	New Jersey Devils	82	42	37	3	29	230	254	−24	87
8	New York Rangers	82	34	39	9	25	238	250	−12	77

Source: National Hockey League
Rules for classification: 1) Fewer number of games played (GP, only during regular season); 2) Greater number of regulation wins (RW); 3) Greater number of wins in regulation and overtime, excluding shootout wins (ROW); 4) Greater number of total wins, including shootouts (W); 5) Greater number of points earned in head-to-head play; if teams played an uneven number of head-to-head games, the result of the first game on the home ice of the team with the extra home game is discarded; 6) Greater goal differential (GD); 7) Greater number of goals scored (GF)
x – Clinched playoff spot; z – Clinched conference

=== Conference standings ===
Eastern Conference Wild Card
Pos	Div	Team	GP	W	L	OTL	RW	GF	GA	GD	Pts
1	AT	x – Boston Bruins	82	45	27	10	33	272	250	+22	100
2	AT	x – Ottawa Senators	82	44	27	11	38	278	246	+32	99
3	ME	Washington Capitals	82	43	30	9	37	263	244	+19	95
4	AT	Detroit Red Wings	82	41	31	10	30	241	258	−17	92
5	ME	Columbus Blue Jackets	82	40	30	12	28	253	253	0	92
6	ME	New York Islanders	82	43	34	5	29	233	241	−8	91
7	ME	New Jersey Devils	82	42	37	3	29	230	254	−24	87
8	AT	Florida Panthers	82	40	38	4	32	251	276	−25	84
9	AT	Toronto Maple Leafs	82	32	36	14	23	253	299	−46	78
10	ME	New York Rangers	82	34	39	9	25	238	250	−12	77

Source: National Hockey League
Rules for classification: 1) Fewer number of games played (GP, only during regular season); 2) Greater number of regulation wins (RW); 3) Greater number of wins in regulation and overtime, excluding shootout wins (ROW); 4) Greater number of total wins, including shootouts (W); 5) Greater number of points earned in head-to-head play; if teams played an uneven number of head-to-head games, the result of the first game on the home ice of the team with the extra home game is discarded; 6) Greater goal differential (GD); 7) Greater number of goals scored (GF)
x – Clinched playoff spot

== Schedule and results ==
=== Preseason ===
The Preseason schedule was released on June 24, 2025.

2025 preseason game log
September/October: 4–1–1 (home: 2–0–0; road: 2–1–1)

#	Date	Visitor	Score	Home	OT	Location	Attendance	Record
1	September 22	Pittsburgh	1–2	Montreal	SO	Bell Centre	20,595	0–0–1
2	September 24	Pittsburgh	1–4	Columbus		Nationwide Arena	11,185	0–1–1
3	September 26	Detroit	2–3	Pittsburgh		PPG Paints Arena	10,729	1–1–1
4	September 27	Columbus	1–4	Pittsburgh		PPG Paints Arena	18,333	2–1–1
5	September 29	Pittsburgh	2–1	Detroit		Little Caesars Arena	15,244	3–1–1
6	October 1	Pittsburgh	5–3	Buffalo		KeyBank Center	11,591	4–1–1
7	October 3	Buffalo	4–5	Pittsburgh	OT	PPG Paints Arena	11,591	5–1–1

Legend

Win Loss OT/SO Loss

=== Regular season ===
The regular season schedule was released on July 16, 2025.

2025–26 game log
October: 8–2–2 (home: 3–1–1; road: 5–1–1)

#	Date	Visitor	Score	Home	OT	Arena	Decision	Attendance	Record	Points	Recap
1	October 7	Pittsburgh	3–0	NY Rangers		Madison Square Garden	Silovs	18,006	1–0–0	2	
2	October 9	NY Islanders	3–4	Pittsburgh		PPG Paints Arena	Jarry	16,107	2–0–0	4	
3	October 11	NY Rangers	6–1	Pittsburgh		PPG Paints Arena	Silovs	16,716	2–1–0	4	
4	October 14	Pittsburgh	3–4	Anaheim		Honda Center	Jarry	17,622	2–2–0	4	
5	October 16	Pittsburgh	4–2	Los Angeles		Crypto.com Arena	Silovs	14,737	3–2–0	6	
6	October 18	Pittsburgh	3–0	San Jose		SAP Center	Jarry	17,435	4–2–0	8	
7	October 21	Vancouver	1–5	Pittsburgh		PPG Paints Arena	Silovs	13,685	5–2–0	10	
8	October 23	Pittsburgh	5–3	Florida		Amerant Bank Arena	Jarry	19,373	6–2–0	12	
9	October 25	Columbus	5–4	Pittsburgh	SO	PPG Paints Arena	Silovs	15,261	6–2–1	13	
10	October 27	St. Louis	3–6	Pittsburgh		PPG Paints Arena	Jarry	13,303	7–2–1	15	
11	October 28	Pittsburgh	2–3	Philadelphia	SO	Xfinity Mobile Arena	Silovs	17,245	7–2–2	16	
12	October 30	Pittsburgh	4–1	Minnesota		Grand Casino Arena	Jarry	16,203	8–2–2	18	

November: 4–5–3 (home: 4–3–1; road: 0–2–2)

#	Date	Visitor	Score	Home	OT	Arena	Decision	Attendance	Record	Points	Recap
13	November 1	Pittsburgh	2–5	Winnipeg		Canada Life Centre	Silovs	14,262	8–3–2	18	
14	November 3	Pittsburgh	3–4	Toronto		Scotiabank Arena	Jarry	18,916	8–4–2	18	
15	November 6	Washington	3–5	Pittsburgh		PPG Paints Arena	Silovs	18,384	9–4–2	20	
16	November 8	Pittsburgh	1–2	New Jersey	SO	Prudential Center	Silovs	16,514	9–4–3	21	
17	November 9	Los Angeles	3–2	Pittsburgh		PPG Paints Arena	Murashov	18,343	9–5–3	21	
18	November 14	Pittsburgh	1–2	Nashville	OT	Avicii Arena	Silovs	12,766	9–5–4	22	
19	November 16	Nashville	0–4	Pittsburgh		Avicii Arena	Murashov	12,723	10–5–4	24	
20	November 21	Minnesota	5–0	Pittsburgh		PPG Paints Arena	Silovs	17,527	10–6–4	24	
21	November 22	Seattle	3–2	Pittsburgh	OT	PPG Paints Arena	Murashov	17,783	10–6–5	25	
22	November 26	Buffalo	2–4	Pittsburgh		PPG Paints Arena	Jarry	17,543	11–6–5	27	
23	November 28	Pittsburgh	4–3	Columbus	OT	Nationwide Arena	Jarry	18,194	12–6–5	29	
24	November 29	Toronto	7–2	Pittsburgh		PPG Paints Arena	Silovs	17,310	12–7–5	29	

December: 5–5–4 (home: 2–2–3; road: 3–3–1)

#	Date	Visitor	Score	Home	OT	Arena	Decision	Attendance	Record	Points	Recap
25	December 1	Pittsburgh	5–1	Philadelphia		Xfinity Mobile Arena	Jarry	17,338	13–7–5	31	
26	December 4	Pittsburgh	4–3	Tampa Bay		Benchmark International Arena	Jarry	19,032	14–7–5	33	
27	December 7	Pittsburgh	2–3	Dallas	SO	American Airlines Center	Jarry	18,532	14–7–6	34	
28	December 9	Anaheim	4–3	Pittsburgh	SO	PPG Paints Arena	Silovs	15,165	14–7–7	35	
29	December 11	Montreal	4–2	Pittsburgh		PPG Paints Arena	Jarry	14,845	14–8–7	35	
30	December 13	San Jose	6–5	Pittsburgh	OT	PPG Paints Arena	Silovs	17,059	14–8–8	36	
31	December 14	Utah	5–4	Pittsburgh	OT	PPG Paints Arena	Murashov	15,686	14–8–9	37	
32	December 16	Edmonton	6–4	Pittsburgh		PPG Paints Arena	Skinner	15,285	14–9–9	37	
33	December 18	Pittsburgh	0–4	Ottawa		Canadian Tire Centre	Silovs	17,260	14–10–9	37	
34	December 20	Pittsburgh	0–4	Montreal		Bell Centre	Skinner	20,962	14–11–9	37	
35	December 21	Montreal	3–4	Pittsburgh	SO	PPG Paints Arena	Silovs	17,695	15–11–9	39	
36	December 23	Pittsburgh	3–6	Toronto		Scotiabank Arena	Skinner	18,979	15–12–9	39	
37	December 28	Pittsburgh	7–3	Chicago		United Center	Silovs	20,173	16–12–9	41	
38	December 30	Carolina	1–5	Pittsburgh		PPG Paints Arena	Skinner	16,011	17–12–9	43	

January: 11–2–2 (home: 5–1–2; road: 6–1–0)

#	Date	Visitor	Score	Home	OT	Arena	Decision	Attendance	Record	Points	Recap
39	January 1	Detroit	3–4	Pittsburgh	OT	PPG Paints Arena	Silovs	15,540	18–12–9	45	
40	January 3	Pittsburgh	4–1	Detroit		Little Caesars Arena	Skinner	19,515	19–12–9	47	
41	January 4	Pittsburgh	5–4	Columbus	OT	Nationwide Arena	Silovs	18,212	20–12–9	49	
42	January 8	New Jersey	1–4	Pittsburgh		PPG Paints Arena	Skinner	16,125	21–12–9	51	
43	January 10	Calgary	2–1	Pittsburgh		PPG Paints Arena	Silovs	18,322	21–13–9	51	
44	January 11	Pittsburgh	0–1	Boston		TD Garden	Skinner	17,850	21–14–9	51	
45	January 13	Tampa Bay	2–1	Pittsburgh	SO	PPG Paints Arena	Silovs	14,546	21–14–10	52	
46	January 15	Philadelphia	3–6	Pittsburgh		PPG Paints Arena	Skinner	17,963	22–14–10	54	
47	January 17	Columbus	4–3	Pittsburgh	SO	PPG Paints Arena	Silovs	18,296	22–14–11	55	
48	January 19	Pittsburgh	6–3	Seattle		Climate Pledge Arena	Skinner	17,151	23–14–11	57	
49	January 21	Pittsburgh	4–1	Calgary		Scotiabank Saddledome	Skinner	17,997	24–14–11	59	
50	January 22	Pittsburgh	6–2	Edmonton		Rogers Place	Silovs	18,347	25–14–11	61	
51	January 25	Pittsburgh	3–2	Vancouver		Rogers Arena	Skinner	18,955	26–14–11	63	
52	January 29	Chicago	2–6	Pittsburgh		PPG Paints Arena	Silovs	16,715	27–14–11	65	
53	January 31	NY Rangers	5–6	Pittsburgh		PPG Paints Arena	Skinner	18,370	28–14–11	67	

February: 2–1–2 (home: 1–1–0; road: 1–0–2)

#	Date	Visitor	Score	Home	OT	Arena	Decision	Attendance	Record	Points	Recap
54	February 2	Ottawa	3–2	Pittsburgh		PPG Paints Arena	Silovs	17,967	28–15–11	67	
55	February 3	Pittsburgh	4–5	NY Islanders	OT	UBS Arena	Skinner	17,255	28–15–12	68	
56	February 5	Pittsburgh	5–2	Buffalo		KeyBank Center	Silovs	19,070	29–15–12	70	
57	February 26	New Jersey	1–4	Pittsburgh		PPG Paints Arena	Silovs	18,288	30–15–12	72	
58	February 28	Pittsburgh	2–3	NY Rangers	SO	Madison Square Garden	Skinner	17,889	30–15–13	73	

March: 8–6–3 (home: 4–4–1; road: 4–2–2)

#	Date	Visitor	Score	Home	OT	Arena	Decision	Attendance	Record	Points	Recap
59	March 1	Vegas	0–5	Pittsburgh		PPG Paints Arena	Silovs	18,195	31–15–13	75	
60	March 3	Pittsburgh	1–2	Boston		TD Garden	Skinner	17,850	31–16–13	75	
61	March 5	Buffalo	5–1	Pittsburgh		PPG Paints Arena	Silovs	17,572	31–17–13	75	
62	March 7	Philadelphia	4–3	Pittsburgh	SO	PPG Paints Arena	Skinner	18,342	31–17–14	76	
63	March 8	Boston	4–5	Pittsburgh	OT	PPG Paints Arena	Silovs	18,029	32–17–14	78	
64	March 10	Pittsburgh	4–5	Carolina	SO	Lenovo Center	Skinner	18,569	32–17–15	79	
65	March 12	Pittsburgh	2–6	Vegas		T-Mobile Arena	Silovs	17,949	32–18–15	79	
66	March 14	Pittsburgh	4–3	Utah		Delta Center	Skinner	12,478	33–18–15	81	
67	March 16	Pittsburgh	7–2	Colorado		Ball Arena	Silovs	18,121	34–18–15	83	
68	March 18	Pittsburgh	5–6	Carolina	OT	Lenovo Center	Skinner	18,581	34–18–16	84	
69	March 21	Winnipeg	4–5	Pittsburgh	SO	PPG Paints Arena	Silovs	18,360	35–18–16	86	
70	March 22	Carolina	5–1	Pittsburgh		PPG Paints Arena	Skinner	18,048	35–19–16	86	
71	March 24	Colorado	6–2	Pittsburgh		PPG Paints Arena	Silovs	18,307	35–20–16	86	
72	March 26	Pittsburgh	4–3	Ottawa	SO	Canadian Tire Centre	Skinner	17,545	36–20–16	88	
73	March 28	Dallas	6–3	Pittsburgh		PPG Paints Arena	Skinner	18,367	36–21–16	88	
74	March 30	Pittsburgh	8–3	NY Islanders		UBS Arena	Silovs	17,255	37–21–16	90	
75	March 31	Detroit	1–5	Pittsburgh		PPG Paints Arena	Skinner	18,399	38–21–16	92	

April: 3–4–0 (home: 2–1–0; road: 1–3–0)

#	Date	Visitor	Score	Home	OT	Arena	Decision	Attendance	Record	Points	Recap
76	April 2	Pittsburgh	3–6	Tampa Bay		Benchmark International Arena	Skinner	19,092	38–22–16	92	
77	April 4	Florida	4–9	Pittsburgh		PPG Paints Arena	Silovs	18,336	39–22–16	94	
78	April 5	Florida	2–5	Pittsburgh		PPG Paints Arena	Silovs	17,028	40–22–16	96	
79	April 9	Pittsburgh	5–2	New Jersey		Prudential Center	Skinner	16,514	41–22–16	98	
80	April 11	Washington	6–3	Pittsburgh		PPG Paints Arena	Silovs	18,410	41–23–16	98	
81	April 12	Pittsburgh	0–3	Washington		Capital One Arena	Skinner	18,347	41–24–16	98	
82	April 14	Pittsburgh	5–7	St. Louis		Enterprise Center	Silovs	18,096	41–25–16	98	

Legend: Win (2 points) Loss (0 points) Overtime/shootout loss (1 point)
^{A} Game played at Avicii Arena in Stockholm, Sweden.

=== Playoffs ===
2026 Stanley Cup playoffs
Eastern Conference first round vs. (M3) Philadelphia Flyers: Philadelphia won 4–2

#	Date	Visitor	Score	Home	OT	Decision	Attendance	Series	Recap
1	April 18	Philadelphia	3–2	Pittsburgh		Skinner	18,346	0–1	
2	April 20	Philadelphia	3–0	Pittsburgh		Skinner	18,308	0–2	
3	April 22	Pittsburgh	2–5	Philadelphia		Skinner	19,937	0–3	
4	April 25	Pittsburgh	4–2	Philadelphia		Silovs	20,053	1–3	
5	April 27	Philadelphia	2–3	Pittsburgh		Silovs	18,343	2–3	
6	April 29	Pittsburgh	0–1	Philadelphia	OT	Silovs	20,005	2–4	

Legend: Win Loss

== Player statistics ==
As of end of 2026 season

Skaters

Regular season
Player	GP	G	A	Pts	+/−	PIM
Sidney Crosby	68	29	45	74	0	44
Erik Karlsson	75	15	51	66	+8	22
Bryan Rust	72	29	36	65	0	26
Anthony Mantha	81	33	31	64	+10	43
Evgeni Malkin	56	19	42	61	+13	61
Rickard Rakell	60	24	24	48	–2	8
Tommy Novak	82	16	26	42	+1	24
Egor Chinakhov^{†}	43	18	18	36	+4	4
Ben Kindel	77	17	18	35	–5	18
Ryan Shea	80	6	29	35	+30	22
Justin Brazeau	64	17	17	34	+5	14
Kris Letang	74	3	31	34	–4	38
Connor Dewar	78	14	16	30	+16	19
Parker Wotherspoon	80	3	27	30	+17	55
Noel Acciari	67	13	12	25	+14	25
Blake Lizotte	55	7	12	19	+6	25
Elmer Soderblom^{†}	20	5	5	10	+3	11
Kevin Hayes	28	4	4	8	–1	8
Ville Koivunen	39	2	5	7	–10	10
Brett Kulak^{†‡}	25	1	6	7	+2	18
Samuel Girard^{†}	20	0	7	7	+5	8
Jack St. Ivany	20	0	7	7	+4	6
Rutger McGroarty	24	3	3	6	–3	4
Connor Clifton	50	2	4	6	+5	53
Avery Hayes	16	5	0	5	–4	12
Ilya Solovyov^{†}	14	0	5	5	+1	10
Filip Hallander	13	1	3	4	+4	2
Matt Dumba	11	1	2	3	–5	11
Danton Heinen^{‡}	13	1	1	2	+1	8
Ryan Graves	22	1	0	1	–3	10
Harrison Brunicke	9	1	0	1	–4	6
Caleb Jones	7	0	1	1	+1	0
Joona Koppanen	13	0	1	1	–2	2
Philip Tomasino^{‡}	9	0	1	1	–2	0
Bokondji Imama	2	0	0	0	0	5
Rafael Harvey-Pinard	1	0	0	0	+1	0
Sam Poulin^{‡}	2	0	0	0	–2	0
Tristan Broz	1	0	0	0	–1	0
Owen Pickering	4	0	0	0	–3	2
Jake Livanavage	1	0	0	0	–2	0

Playoffs
Player	GP	G	A	Pts	+/−	PIM
Sidney Crosby	6	1	4	5	–1	6
Rickard Rakell	6	1	3	4	+1	0
Evgeni Malkin	6	2	1	3	0	6
Erik Karlsson	6	1	2	3	–4	10
Kris Letang	6	2	0	2	–2	20
Connor Dewar	6	2	0	2	0	2
Bryan Rust	6	1	1	2	–2	4
Tommy Novak	6	0	2	2	–4	0
Blake Lizotte	6	0	2	2	0	2
Elmer Soderblom	5	1	0	1	–1	0
Anthony Mantha	6	0	1	1	–5	20
Parker Wotherspoon	6	0	1	1	–2	12
Noel Acciari	6	0	1	1	–1	12
Ryan Shea	6	0	1	1	0	2
Connor Clifton	3	0	0	0	–3	0
Samuel Girard	6	0	0	0	–1	4
Justin Brazeau	1	0	0	0	0	0
Ilya Solovyov	3	0	0	0	0	0
Egor Chinakhov	6	0	0	0	–4	0
Ben Kindel	6	0	0	0	–3	0

Goaltenders

Regular season
Player	GP	GS	TOI	W	L	OT	GA	GAA	SA	SV%	SO	G	A	PIM
Arturs Silovs	39	38	2246:33	19	12	8	115	3.07	1020	.888	2	0	3	4
Stuart Skinner^{†}	27	27	1605:18	12	9	5	80	2.99	697	.885	0	0	1	0
Tristan Jarry^{‡}	14	13	810:45	9	3	1	36	2.66	396	.909	1	0	0	0
Sergei Murashov	5	4	281:17	1	1	2	12	2.56	116	.897	1	0	0	0

Playoffs
Player	GP	GS	TOI	W	L	GA	GAA	SA	SV%	SO	G	A	PIM
Arturs Silovs	3	3	197:16	2	1	5	1.52	82	.939	0	0	0	0
Stuart Skinner	3	3	175:12	0	3	9	3.08	71	.873	0	0	0	0

^{†}Denotes player spent time with another team before joining the Penguins. Stats reflect time with the Penguins only.
^{‡}Denotes player was traded mid-season. Stats reflect time with the Penguins only

== Transactions ==
=== Trades ===
Date	Details	
June 27, 2025	To Philadelphia Flyers 2025 1st-round pick	To Pittsburgh Penguins 2025 1st-round pick 2025 1st-round pick
June 27, 2025	To Los Angeles Kings 2025 1st-round pick 2025 2nd-round pick	To Pittsburgh Penguins 2025 1st-round pick
June 28, 2025	To Buffalo Sabres Isaac Belliveau; Conor Timmins	To Pittsburgh Penguins Connor Clifton; 2025 2nd-round pick
June 28, 2025	To Vegas Golden Knights 2025 3rd-round pick	To Pittsburgh Penguins 2025 3rd-round pick 2025 5th-round pick
July 1, 2025	To San Jose Sharks Alex Nedeljkovic	To Pittsburgh Penguins 2028 3rd-round pick
July 10, 2025	To Dallas Stars Vladislav Kolyachonok	To Pittsburgh Penguins Matt Dumba; 2028 2nd-round pick
July 13, 2025	To Vancouver Canucks 2027 4th-round pick	To Pittsburgh Penguins Arturs Silovs
December 12, 2025	To Edmonton Oilers Tristan Jarry; Sam Poulin	To Pittsburgh Penguins Brett Kulak; Stuart Skinner; 2029 2nd-round pick
December 29, 2025	To Columbus Blue Jackets Danton Heinen; 2026 3rd-round pick 2027 4th-round pick	To Pittsburgh Penguins Egor Chinakhov
December 31, 2025	To Philadelphia Flyers Philip Tomasino	To Pittsburgh Penguins Egor Zamula
January 20, 2026	To Colorado Avalanche Valtteri Puustinen; 2026 7th-round pick	To Pittsburgh Penguins Ilya Solovyov
February 24, 2026	To Colorado Avalanche Brett Kulak	To Pittsburgh Penguins Samuel Girard; 2028 2nd-round pick
March 6, 2026	To Detroit Red Wings 2026 3rd-round pick	To Pittsburgh Penguins Elmer Soderblom
June 13, 2026	To Florida Panthers Emil Pieniniemi	To Pittsburgh Penguins Oliver Okuliar

=== Players acquired ===
Date	Player	Former team	Term	Via
July 1, 2025	Justin Brazeau	Minnesota Wild	2-year	Free Agency
July 1, 2025	Parker Wotherspoon	Boston Bruins	2-year	Free Agency
July 1, 2025	Caleb Jones	Los Angeles Kings	2-year	Free Agency
July 2, 2025	Alexander Alexeyev	Washington Capitals	1-year	Free Agency
July 2, 2025	Anthony Mantha	Calgary Flames	1-year	Free Agency
July 2, 2025	Rafael Harvey-Pinard	Montreal Canadiens	1-year	Free Agency
July 2, 2025	Phil Kemp	Edmonton Oilers	2-year	Free Agency

=== Players lost ===
Date	Player	New team	Term	Via
July 1, 2025	Jimmy Huntington	San Jose Sharks	1-year	Free agency
July 1, 2025	Nate Clurman	Montreal Canadiens	1-year	Free agency
July 2, 2025	Pierre-Olivier Joseph	Vancouver Canucks	1-year	Free agency
October 5, 2025	Matt Grzelcyk	Chicago Blackhawks	1-year	Free agency

=== Signings ===
Date	Player	Term
July 1, 2025	Philip Tomasino	1-year
July 1, 2025	Connor Dewar	1-year
July 8, 2025	Ben Kindel	3-year^{[A]}
September 12, 2025	Marc-Andre Fleury	PTO^{[B]}
March 22, 2026	Bill Zonnon	3-year^{[A]}^{[C]}

Key:

- ^{A} – Entry Level Contract
- ^{B} – Professional Tryout Contract
- ^{C} – Begins next season

== Draft picks ==
Below are the Pittsburgh Penguins's selections at the 2025 NHL entry draft, which was held on June 27 and June 28, 2025, and it took place at the Peacock Theater in Los Angeles.

Round	#	Player	Pos	Nationality	College/Junior/Club team (League)
1	11	Ben Kindel	C	Canada	Calgary Hitmen (WHL)
1	22^{[1]}	Bill Zonnon	RW	Canada	Rouyn-Noranda Huskies (QMJHL)
1	24^{[2]}	Will Horcoff	C	Canada	Michigan Wolverines (BIG10)
2	39^{[3]}	Peyton Kettles	D	Canada	Swift Current Broncos (WHL)
3	73	Charlton Trethewey	D	United States	USA U-18 (USHL)
3	84^{[4]}	Gabriel D'Aigle	G	Canada	Victoriaville Tigres (QMJHL)
3	91^{[5]}	Brady Peddle	D	Canada	Waterloo Black Hawks (USHL)
4	105	Travis Hayes	RW	United States	Sault Ste. Marie Greyhounds (OHL)
5	130^{[6]}	Ryan Miller	C	Canada	Portland Winterhawks (WHL)
5	148^{[7]}	Quinn Beauchesne	D	Canada	Guelph Storm (OHL)
5	154^{[8]}	Jordan Charron	RW	Canada	Sault Ste. Marie Greyhounds (OHL)
6	169	Carter Sanderson	LW	United States	Muskegon Lumberjacks (USHL)
7	201	Kale Dach	C	Canada	Sherwood Park Crusaders (BCHL)

Notes:
^{1} The New York Rangers' first-round pick went to the Philadelphia Flyers as the result of a trade on June 27, 2025, that sent Colorado and Edmonton's first-round picks both in 2025 (22nd and 31st overall) to Pittsburgh in exchange for this pick. Pittsburgh previously acquired this pick as the result of a trade on January 31, 2025, that sent Drew O'Connor and Marcus Pettersson to Vancouver in exchange for Vincent Desharnais, Melvin Fernstrom, Danton Heinen and this pick. The condition – Pittsburgh will receive a first-round pick in 2025 if the Rangers' first-round pick in 2025 is inside of the top thirteen selections, at the Rangers' choice. – was converted when the Rangers elected to send their first-round pick in 2025 to Pittsburgh on June 24, 2025. Vancouver previously acquired this pick as the result of a trade on January 31, 2025, that sent Erik Brannstrom, Jackson Dorrington and J. T. Miller to New York in exchange for Filip Chytil, Victor Mancini and this conditional pick.

^{2} The Los Angeles Kings' first-round pick went to the Pittsburgh Penguins as the result of a trade on June 27, 2025, that sent Edmonton's first-round pick and Washington's second-round pick both in 2025 (31st and 59th overall) to Los Angeles in exchange for this pick.

^{3} The Buffalo Sabres' second-round pick went to the Pittsburgh Penguins as the result of a trade on June 28, 2025, that sent Isaac Belliveau and Conor Timmins to Buffalo in exchange for Connor Clifton and this pick.

^{4} The Minnesota Wild's third-round pick went to the Pittsburgh Penguins as the result of a trade on August 13, 2024, that sent Jordan Frasca to Nashville in exchange for Cody Glass, a sixth-round pick in 2026 and this pick. Nashville previously acquired this pick as the result of a trade on June 28, 2024, that sent a second-round pick in 2024 to Philadelphia in exchange for a third-round pick in 2024 and this pick. Philadelphia previously acquired this pick as the result of a trade on June 28, 2024, that sent a first-round pick in 2024 to Minnesota in exchange for a first-round pick in 2024 and this pick.

^{5} The Washington Capitals' third-round pick went to the Pittsburgh Penguins as the result of a trade on June 28, 2025, that sent Ottawa's third-round pick in 2025 (85th overall) to Vegas in exchange for a fifth-round pick in 2025 (154th overall) and this pick. Vegas previously acquired this pick as the result of a trade on June 29, 2024, that sent Logan Thompson to Washington in exchange for the Islanders' third-round pick in 2024 and this pick.

^{6} The Chicago Blackhawks' fifth-round pick went to the Pittsburgh Penguins as the result of a trade on November 12, 2024, that sent Lars Eller to Washington in exchange for a third-round pick in 2027 and this pick. Washington previously acquired this pick as the result of a trade on March 7, 2024, that sent Joel Edmundson to Toronto in exchange for a third-round pick in 2024 and this pick. Toronto previously acquired this pick as the result of a trade on February 27, 2023, that sent Joey Anderson, Pavel Gogolev, a conditional first-round pick in 2025 and a second-round pick in 2026 to Chicago in exchange for Sam Lafferty, Jake McCabe, a conditional fifth-round pick in 2024 and this pick (being conditional at the time of the trade). The condition – Chicago will receive a first-round pick in 2025 if Toronto's first-round pick in 2025 is outside of the top ten selections The condition – Toronto will receive a fifth-round pick in 2025 if McCabe plays in at least 50% of Toronto's games during the 2023 Stanley Cup playoffs and at least 25% of Toronto's games during the 2023–24 NHL season – was converted when McCabe played his 21st game of the season on December 14, 2023.

^{7} The Minnesota Wild's fifth-round pick went to the Pittsburgh Penguins as the result of a trade on July 1, 2024, that sent Reilly Smith to New York in exchange for a second-round pick in 2027 and this pick (being conditional at the time of the trade). The condition – Pittsburgh will receive the lower of New York or Minnesota's fifth-round picks in 2025 – was converted when Minnesota clinched a playoff spot in the 2025 Stanley Cup playoffs on April 15, 2025. The Rangers previously acquired this pick as the result of a trade on November 25, 2022, that sent Ryan Reaves to Minnesota in exchange for this pick.

^{8} The Vegas Golden Knights' fifth-round pick went to the Pittsburgh Penguins as the result of a trade on June 28, 2025, that sent Ottawa's third-round pick in 2025 (85th overall) to Vegas in exchange for Washington's third-round pick in 2025 (91st overall) and this pick.
