= 2025–26 Edmonton Oilers season =

National Hockey League season

2025–26 Edmonton Oilers
- Division: 2nd Pacific
- Conference: 5th Western
- 2025–26 record: 41–30–11
- Home record: 22–14–5
- Road record: 19–16–6
- Goals for: 282
- Goals against: 269

Team information
- General manager: Stan Bowman
- Coach: Kris Knoblauch
- Captain: Connor McDavid
- Alternate captains: Leon Draisaitl; Ryan Nugent-Hopkins; Darnell Nurse
- Arena: Rogers Place
- Average attendance: 18,308
- Minor league affiliates: Bakersfield Condors (AHL); Fort Wayne Komets (ECHL)

Team leaders
- Goals: Connor McDavid (48)
- Assists: Connor McDavid (90)
- Points: Connor McDavid (138)
- Penalty minutes: Darnell Nurse (104)
- Plus/minus: Mattias Ekholm (+32)
- Wins: Connor Ingram (16)
- Goals against average: Connor Ingram (2.60)

The 2025–26 Edmonton Oilers season was the 47th season for the National Hockey League (NHL) franchise that was established on June 22, 1979, and was the 54th season for the organization overall, including their play in the World Hockey Association (WHA).

On April 11, 2026, the Oilers clinched their seventh consecutive playoff spot after the Winnipeg Jets lost to the Philadelphia Flyers. They faced the Anaheim Ducks in the first round of the playoffs, where they would lose in six games, failing to reach the Stanley Cup Final for the first time since 2023. They also failed to make it past the first round for the first time since 2021. The Oilers would fire Kris Knoblauch after the season.

== Standings ==
=== Divisional standings ===
Pacific Division
Pos	Team	GP	W	L	OTL	RW	GF	GA	GD	Pts
1	y – Vegas Golden Knights	82	39	26	17	30	265	250	+15	95
2	x – Edmonton Oilers	82	41	30	11	32	282	269	+13	93
3	x – Anaheim Ducks	82	43	33	6	26	273	288	−15	92
4	x – Los Angeles Kings	82	35	27	20	22	225	247	−22	90
5	San Jose Sharks	82	39	35	8	27	251	292	−41	86
6	Seattle Kraken	82	34	37	11	26	226	263	−37	79
7	Calgary Flames	82	34	39	9	27	212	259	−47	77
8	Vancouver Canucks	82	25	49	8	15	216	316	−100	58

Source: National Hockey League
Rules for classification: 1) Fewer number of games played (GP, only during regular season); 2) Greater number of regulation wins (RW); 3) Greater number of wins in regulation and overtime, excluding shootout wins (ROW); 4) Greater number of total wins, including shootouts (W); 5) Greater number of points earned in head-to-head play; if teams played an uneven number of head-to-head games, the result of the first game on the home ice of the team with the extra home game is discarded; 6) Greater goal differential (GD); 7) Greater number of goals scored (GF)
x – Clinched playoff spot; y – Clinched division

=== Conference standings ===
Western Conference Wild Card
Pos	Div	Team	GP	W	L	OTL	RW	GF	GA	GD	Pts
1	CE	x – Utah Mammoth	82	43	33	6	33	268	240	+28	92
2	PA	x – Los Angeles Kings	82	35	27	20	22	225	247	−22	90
3	CE	St. Louis Blues	82	37	33	12	33	231	258	−27	86
4	CE	Nashville Predators	82	38	34	10	28	247	269	−22	86
5	PA	San Jose Sharks	82	39	35	8	27	251	292	−41	86
6	CE	Winnipeg Jets	82	35	35	12	28	231	260	−29	82
7	PA	Seattle Kraken	82	34	37	11	26	226	263	−37	79
8	PA	Calgary Flames	82	34	39	9	27	212	259	−47	77
9	CE	Chicago Blackhawks	82	29	39	14	22	213	275	−62	72
10	PA	Vancouver Canucks	82	25	49	8	15	216	316	−100	58

Source: National Hockey League
Rules for classification: 1) Fewer number of games played (GP, only during regular season); 2) Greater number of regulation wins (RW); 3) Greater number of wins in regulation and overtime, excluding shootout wins (ROW); 4) Greater number of total wins, including shootouts (W); 5) Greater number of points earned in head-to-head play; if teams played an uneven number of head-to-head games, the result of the first game on the home ice of the team with the extra home game is discarded; 6) Greater goal differential (GD); 7) Greater number of goals scored (GF)
x – Clinched playoff spot

== Schedule and results ==
=== Preseason ===
The preseason schedule was published on July 3, 2025.

2025 preseason game log: 4–2–2 (Home: 2–1–1; Road: 2–1–1)
#	Date	Visitor	Score	Home	OT	Decision	Attendance	Record	Recap
1	September 21	Calgary	3–2	Edmonton	OT	Jonsson	16,147	1–0–0
2	September 21	Edmonton	3–0	Calgary		Tomkins	10,000	1–0–1
3	September 23	Edmonton	3–2	Winnipeg		Tomkins	12,968	2–0–1
4	September 24	Seattle	4–1	Edmonton		Skinner	15,948	2–1–1
5	September 26	Winnipeg	0–4	Edmonton		Pickard	16,491	3–1–1
6	September 28	Vancouver	3–4	Edmonton		Skinner	16,656	4–1–1
7	October 1	Edmonton	2–4	Seattle		Pickard	17,151	4–2–1
8	October 3	Edmonton	2–3	Vancouver	OT	Pickard	18,902	4–2–2

=== Regular season ===
The Edmonton Oilers regular season schedule was released on July 16, 2025.

2025–26 game log

October: 5–4–3 (Home: 3–0–2; Road: 2–4–1)
#	Date	Visitor	Score	Home	OT	Decision	Attendance	Record	Points	Recap
1	October 8	Calgary	4–3	Edmonton	SO	Skinner	18,347	0–0–1	1
2	October 11	Vancouver	1–3	Edmonton		Pickard	18,347	1–0–1	3
3	October 14	Edmonton	2–0	NY Rangers		Skinner	16,497	2–0–1	5
4	October 16	Edmonton	2–4	NY Islanders		Skinner	14,837	2–1–1	5
5	October 18	Edmonton	3–5	New Jersey		Pickard	16,514	2–2–1	5
6	October 19	Edmonton	2–4	Detroit		Skinner	19,515	2–3–1	5
7	October 21	Edmonton	3–2	Ottawa	OT	Skinner	17,436	3–3–1	7
8	October 23	Montreal	5–6	Edmonton		Pickard	18,347	4–3–1	9
9	October 25	Edmonton	2–3	Seattle		Skinner	17,151	4–4–1	9
10	October 26	Edmonton	3–4	Vancouver	OT	Pickard	18,770	4–4–2	10
11	October 28	Utah	3–6	Edmonton		Skinner	18,347	5–4–2	12
12	October 30	NY Rangers	4–3	Edmonton	OT	Skinner	18,347	5–4–3	13

November: 6–6–2 (Home: 2–2–0; Road: 4–4–2)
#	Date	Visitor	Score	Home	OT	Decision	Attendance	Record	Points	Recap
13	November 1	Chicago	2–3	Edmonton	OT	Skinner	18,347	6–4–3	15
14	November 3	Edmonton	2–3	St. Louis		Pickard	18,096	6–5–3	15
15	November 4	Edmonton	3–4	Dallas	SO	Skinner	18,532	6–5–4	16
16	November 8	Colorado	9–1	Edmonton		Skinner	18,347	6–6–4	16
17	November 10	Columbus	4–5	Edmonton	OT	Skinner	18,247	7–6–4	18
18	November 12	Edmonton	2–1	Philadelphia	OT	Skinner	18,480	8–6–4	20
19	November 13	Edmonton	4–5	Columbus		Pickard	18,749	8–7–4	20
20	November 15	Edmonton	4–3	Carolina	OT	Skinner	18,299	9–7–4	22
21	November 17	Edmonton	1–5	Buffalo		Skinner	16,394	9–8–4	22
22	November 19	Edmonton	4–7	Washington		Skinner	17,929	9–9–4	22
23	November 20	Edmonton	1–2	Tampa Bay	OT	Pickard	19,092	9–9–5	23
24	November 22	Edmonton	6–3	Florida		Skinner	19,534	10–9–5	25
25	November 25	Dallas	8–3	Edmonton		Skinner	18,347	10–10–5	25
26	November 29	Edmonton	4–0	Seattle		Skinner	17,151	11–10–5	27

December: 9–5–1 (Home: 5–2–1; Road: 4–3–0)
#	Date	Visitor	Score	Home	OT	Decision	Attendance	Record	Points	Recap
27	December 2	Minnesota	1–0	Edmonton		Skinner	19,173	11–11–5	27
28	December 4	Seattle	4–9	Edmonton		Pickard	17,496	12–11–5	29
29	December 6	Winnipeg	2–6	Edmonton		Skinner	18,347	13–11–5	31
30	December 9	Buffalo	4–3	Edmonton	OT	Skinner	17,622	13–11–6	32
31	December 11	Detroit	1–4	Edmonton		Skinner	18,347	14–11–6	34
32	December 13	Edmonton	6–3	Toronto		Jarry	19,023	15–11–6	36
33	December 14	Edmonton	1–4	Montreal		Pickard	20,962	15–12–6	36
34	December 16	Edmonton	6–4	Pittsburgh		Jarry	15,285	16–12–6	38
35	December 18	Edmonton	3–1	Boston		Jarry	17,850	17–12–6	40
36	December 20	Edmonton	2–5	Minnesota		Pickard	19,025	17–13–6	40
37	December 21	Vegas	3–4	Edmonton		Ingram	18,347	18–13–6	42
38	December 23	Calgary	1–5	Edmonton		Ingram	18,347	19–13–6	44
39	December 27	Edmonton	2–3	Calgary		Ingram	19,289	19–14–6	44
40	December 29	Edmonton	3–1	Winnipeg		Pickard	15,225	20–14–6	46
41	December 31	Boston	6–2	Edmonton		Ingram	18,347	20–15–6	46

January: 8–5–2 (Home: 5–5–1; Road: 3–0–1)
#	Date	Visitor	Score	Home	OT	Decision	Attendance	Record	Points	Recap
42	January 3	Philadelphia	5–2	Edmonton		Pickard	18,347	20–16–6	46
43	January 6	Nashville	2–6	Edmonton		Ingram	18,347	21–16–6	48
44	January 8	Edmonton	4–3	Winnipeg		Pickard	14,373	22–16–6	50
45	January 10	Los Angeles	4–3	Edmonton	SO	Ingram	18,347	22–16–7	51
46	January 12	Edmonton	4–1	Chicago		Ingram	17,783	23–16–7	53
47	January 13	Edmonton	3–4	Nashville	OT	Jarry	17,591	23–16–8	54
48	January 15	NY Islanders	1–0	Edmonton		Ingram	18,144	23–17–8	54
49	January 17	Edmonton	6–0	Vancouver		Jarry	18,845	24–17–8	56
50	January 18	St. Louis	0–5	Edmonton		Ingram	18,347	25–17–8	58
51	January 20	New Jersey	2–1	Edmonton		Jarry	18,347	25–18–8	58
52	January 22	Pittsburgh	6–2	Edmonton		Jarry	18,347	25–19–8	58
53	January 24	Washington	5–6	Edmonton	OT	Jarry	18,347	26–19–8	60
54	January 26	Anaheim	4–7	Edmonton		Jarry	18,347	27–19–8	62
55	January 29	San Jose	3–4	Edmonton	OT	Ingram	18,347	28–19–8	64
56	January 31	Minnesota	7–3	Edmonton		Jarry	18,347	28–20–8	64

February: 1–4–0 (Home: 0–1–0; Road: 1–3–0)
#	Date	Visitor	Score	Home	OT	Decision	Attendance	Record	Points	Recap
57	February 3	Toronto	5–2	Edmonton		Ingram	18,347	28–21–8	64
58	February 4	Edmonton	3–4	Calgary		Jarry	19,289	28–22–8	64
59	February 25	Edmonton	5–6	Anaheim		Ingram	16,214	28–23–8	64
60	February 26	Edmonton	8–1	Los Angeles		Ingram	17,037	29–23–8	66
61	February 28	Edmonton	4–5	San Jose		Ingram	17,435	29–24–8	66

March: 9–4–1 (Home: 5–3–0; Road: 4–1–1)
#	Date	Visitor	Score	Home	OT	Decision	Attendance	Record	Points	Recap
62	March 3	Ottawa	4–5	Edmonton	OT	Ingram	18,347	30–24–8	68
63	March 6	Carolina	6–3	Edmonton		Jarry	18,347	30–25–8	68
64	March 8	Edmonton	4–2	Vegas		Ingram	17,960	31–25–8	70
65	March 10	Edmonton	4–3	Colorado		Jarry	18,122	32–25–8	72
66	March 12	Edmonton	2–7	Dallas		Jarry	18,532	32–26–8	72
67	March 13	Edmonton	2–3	St. Louis	OT	Ingram	18,096	32–26–9	73
68	March 15	Nashville	1–3	Edmonton		Ingram	18,347	33–26–9	75
69	March 17	San Jose	3–5	Edmonton		Ingram	18,347	34–26–9	77
70	March 19	Florida	4–0	Edmonton		Ingram	18,347	34–27–9	77
71	March 21	Tampa Bay	5–2	Edmonton		Ingram	18,347	34–28–9	77
72	March 24	Edmonton	5–2	Utah		Jarry	12,478	35–28–9	79
73	March 26	Edmonton	4–3	Vegas	OT	Ingram	17,910	36–28–9	81
74	March 28	Anaheim	2–4	Edmonton		Ingram	18,347	37–28–9	83
75	March 31	Seattle	0–3	Edmonton		Ingram	18,347	38–28–9	85

April: 3–2–2 (Home: 2–1–1; Road: 1–1–1)
#	Date	Visitor	Score	Home	OT	Decision	Attendance	Record	Points	Recap
76	April 2	Chicago	1–3	Edmonton		Jarry	18,347	39–28–9	87
77	April 4	Vegas	5–1	Edmonton		Ingram	18,347	39–29–9	87
78	April 7	Edmonton	5–6	Utah	OT	Jarry	12,478	39–29–10	88
79	April 8	Edmonton	5–2	San Jose		Ingram	15,683	40–29–10	90
80	April 11	Edmonton	0–1	Los Angeles		Ingram	18,145	40–30–10	90
81	April 13	Colorado	2–1	Edmonton	SO	Ingram	18,347	40–30–11	91
82	April 16	Vancouver	1–6	Edmonton		Ingram	18,347	41–30–11	93

Legend: Win (2 points) Loss (0 points) Overtime/shootout loss (1 point)

=== Playoffs ===
2026 Stanley Cup Playoffs

Western Conference first round vs. (P3) Anaheim Ducks: Anaheim wins series 4–2
#	Date	Visitor	Score	Home	OT	Decision	Attendance	Series	Recap
1	April 20	Anaheim	3–4	Edmonton		Ingram	18,347	1–0
2	April 22	Anaheim	6–4	Edmonton		Ingram	18,347	1–1
3	April 24	Edmonton	4–7	Anaheim		Ingram	16,735	1–2
4	April 26	Edmonton	3–4	Anaheim	OT	Jarry	16,816	1–3
5	April 28	Anaheim	1–4	Edmonton		Ingram	18,347	2–3
6	April 30	Edmonton	2–5	Anaheim		Ingram	16,820	2–4

Legend: Win Loss

== Player statistics ==
=== Skaters ===
Regular season
Player	GP	G	A	Pts	+/−	PIM
Connor McDavid	82	48	90	138	+17	44
Leon Draisaitl	65	35	62	97	+13	26
Evan Bouchard	82	21	74	95	+25	30
Ryan Nugent-Hopkins	72	20	36	56	−9	21
Zach Hyman	58	31	21	52	+13	28
Mattias Ekholm	82	6	35	41	+32	30
Vasily Podkolzin	82	19	18	37	+16	63
Matt Savoie	82	18	19	37	+6	24
Jack Roslovic	69	21	15	36	−9	16
Darnell Nurse	82	7	17	24	−12	104
Jake Walman	53	8	12	20	−17	10
Kasperi Kapanen	41	8	9	17	+5	14
Adam Henrique	65	3	12	15	−12	18
Andrew Mangiapane^{‡}	52	7	7	14	−19	36
Ty Emberson	72	2	10	12	−1	23
Mattias Janmark	43	1	7	8	−8	22
Trent Frederic	74	4	3	7	−15	58
Curtis Lazar	45	4	2	6	−3	10
Max Jones	21	3	2	5	+3	9
David Tomasek^{‡}	22	3	2	5	−6	10
Isaac Howard	29	2	3	5	−6	12
Colton Dach^{†}	8	2	2	4	0	5
Josh Samanski	24	2	2	4	+2	6
Connor Murphy^{†}	20	1	3	4	+1	25
Jason Dickinson^{†}	17	1	3	4	−3	10
Noah Philp^{‡}	15	2	1	3	−7	4
Alec Regula	29	0	3	3	−16	35
Brett Kulak^{‡}	31	0	2	2	−7	10
Spencer Stastney^{†}	36	1	0	1	−10	10
Connor Clattenburg	5	1	0	1	+1	13
Quinn Hutson	4	1	0	1	−1	0
Riley Stillman	4	0	0	0	+1	0
Troy Stecher^{‡}	6	0	0	0	0	8
Roby Jarventie	3	0	0	0	−1	0

Playoffs
Player	GP	G	A	Pts	+/−	PIM
Leon Draisaitl	6	3	7	10	−2	2
Evan Bouchard	6	1	6	7	−7	0
Kasperi Kapanen	6	4	2	6	+7	0
Vasily Podkolzin	6	3	3	6	+5	5
Connor McDavid	6	1	5	6	−8	2
Ryan Nugent-Hopkins	6	2	3	5	−1	2
Jake Walman	6	0	4	4	−1	8
Connor Murphy	6	2	1	3	+3	0
Jason Dickinson	4	2	1	3	+2	0
Zach Hyman	6	2	0	2	−6	6
Josh Samanski	5	1	1	2	+1	4
Mattias Ekholm	6	0	2	2	−1	0
Jack Roslovic	6	0	1	1	0	2
Ty Emberson	6	0	1	1	+1	0
Colton Dach	5	0	1	1	0	4
Matt Savoie	6	0	1	1	−1	2
Adam Henrique	1	0	0	0	0	0
Darnell Nurse	6	0	0	0	+4	4
Curtis Lazar	5	0	0	0	−1	0
Trent Frederic	4	0	0	0	−3	0

=== Goaltenders ===
Regular season
Player	GP	GS	TOI	W	L	OT	GA	GAA	SA	SV%	SO	G	A	PIM
Connor Ingram	32	30	1,778:14	16	10	3	77	2.60	763	.899	2	0	2	2
Tristan Jarry^{†}	19	16	962:52	9	6	2	62	3.86	436	.858	1	0	1	0
Calvin Pickard	16	13	864:08	5	6	2	53	3.68	410	.871	0	0	0	0
Stuart Skinner^{‡}	23	23	1,316:39	11	8	4	62	2.83	570	.891	2	0	0	0

Playoffs
Player	GP	GS	TOI	W	L	GA	GAA	SA	SV%	SO	G	A	PIM
Connor Ingram	5	5	295:10	2	3	19	3.86	153	.876	0	0	0	0
Tristan Jarry	1	1	62:29	0	1	4	3.84	38	.895	0	0	0	0

^{†}Denotes player spent time with another team before joining the Oilers. Stats reflect time with the Oilers only.
^{‡}Denotes player was traded mid-season. Stats reflect time with the Oilers only.

== Awards and honours ==
=== Awards ===
Player	Award	Awarded	Ref.
Connor McDavid	NHL 1st Star of the Week (Dec. 8 – Dec. 14)	December 15, 2025	
Connor McDavid	NHL 1st Star of the Week (Dec. 15 – Dec. 21)	December 22, 2025	
Connor McDavid	NHL 1st Star of the Month (December)	January 1, 2026	
Evan Bouchard	NHL 3rd Star of the Month (January)	February 1, 2026	
Connor McDavid	NHL 1st All-Star Team	June 12, 2026	
Evan Bouchard	NHL 2nd All-Star Team	June 12, 2026	

=== Milestones ===
Regular season
Player	Milestone	Reached
Isaac Howard	1st NHL game	October 8, 2025
David Tomasek	1st NHL game	October 8, 2025
Leon Draisaitl	400th NHL goal	October 8, 2025
David Tomasek	1st NHL assist 1st NHL point	October 8, 2025
Andrew Mangiapane	500th NHL game	October 11, 2025
Noah Philp	1st NHL goal	October 11, 2025
Stuart Skinner	8th NHL shutout	October 14, 2025
Adam Henrique	1,000th NHL game	October 21, 2025
Isaac Howard	1st NHL goal 1st NHL point	October 21, 2025
Stuart Skinner	100th NHL win	October 21, 2025
David Tomasek	1st NHL goal	October 23, 2025
Leon Draisaitl	800th NHL game	October 26, 2025
Matt Savoie	1st NHL goal	October 30, 2025
Isaac Howard	1st NHL assist	October 30, 2025
Kris Knoblauch	100th NHL win (coach)	November 1, 2025
Connor McDavid	1,100th NHL point	November 3, 2025
Mattias Ekholm	900th NHL game	November 8, 2025
Jake Walman	100th NHL point	November 10, 2025
Brett Kulak	600th NHL game	November 15, 2025
Connor Clattenburg	1st NHL game	November 22, 2025
Evan Bouchard	200th NHL assist	November 22, 2025
Connor Clattenburg	1st NHL goal 1st NHL point	November 25, 2025
Stuart Skinner	9th NHL shutout	November 29, 2025
Connor McDavid	13th NHL hat-trick	December 4, 2025
Zach Hyman	6th NHL hat-trick	December 11, 2025
Alec Regula	1st NHL assist	December 13, 2025
Leon Draisaitl	1,000th NHL point	December 16, 2025
Quinn Hutson	1st NHL goal 1st NHL point	December 18, 2025
Leon Draisaitl	9th NHL hat-trick	December 23, 2025
Connor McDavid	14th NHL hat-trick	January 6, 2026
Ryan Nugent-Hopkins	500th NHL assist	January 6, 2026
Tristan Jarry	23rd NHL shutout	January 17, 2026
Ryan Nugent-Hopkins	1,000th NHL game	January 18, 2026
Spencer Stastney	100th NHL game	January 18, 2026
Connor Ingram	8th NHL shutout	January 18, 2026
Curtis Lazar	600th NHL game	January 20, 2026
Evan Bouchard	400th NHL game	January 24, 2026
Leon Draisaitl	600th NHL assist	January 24, 2026
Evan Bouchard	1st NHL hat-trick	January 24, 2026
Josh Samanski	1st NHL game	January 26, 2026
Mattias Ekholm	1st NHL hat-trick	January 26, 2026
Josh Samanski	1st NHL assist 1st NHL point	January 31, 2026
Evan Bouchard	300th NHL point	February 4, 2026
Jake Walman	300th NHL game	March 3, 2026
Mattias Ekholm	300th NHL assist	March 3, 2026
Trent Frederic	400th NHL game	March 10, 2026
Zach Hyman	700th NHL game	March 12, 2026
Josh Samanski	1st NHL goal	March 21, 2026
Ryan Nugent-Hopkins	800th NHL point	March 24, 2026
Connor McDavid	400th NHL goal	March 24, 2026
Connor McDavid	1,200th NHL point	March 24, 2026
Connor McDavid	800th NHL assist	March 26, 2026
Max Jones	300th NHL game	March 31, 2026
Connor Ingram	9th NHL shutout	March 31, 2026
Mattias Ekholm	400th NHL point	April 7, 2026
Connor McDavid	15th NHL hat-trick	April 8, 2026
Vasily Podkolzin	300th NHL game	April 13, 2026
Matt Savoie	1st NHL hat-trick	April 16, 2026

Playoffs
Player	Milestone	Reached
Colton Dach	1st NHL playoff game	April 20, 2026
Matt Savoie	1st NHL playoff game	April 20, 2026
Ty Emberson	1st NHL playoff goal 1st NHL playoff point	April 20, 2026
Connor Ingram	1st NHL playoff win	April 20, 2026
Josh Samanski	1st NHL playoff game	April 22, 2026
Connor Murphy	1st NHL playoff goal	April 22, 2026
Josh Samanski	1st NHL playoff goal 1st NHL playoff point	April 22, 2026
Matt Savoie	1st NHL playoff assist 1st NHL playoff point	April 22, 2026
Leon Draisaitl	100th NHL playoff game	April 26, 2026
Connor McDavid	100th NHL playoff game	April 26, 2026
Ryan Nugent-Hopkins	100th NHL playoff game	April 26, 2026
Darnell Nurse	100th NHL playoff game	April 30, 2026
Colton Dach	1st NHL playoff assist 1st NHL playoff point	April 30, 2026
Josh Samanski	1st NHL playoff assist	April 30, 2026

== Transactions ==
The Oilers have been involved in the following transactions during the 2025–26 season.

Key:

† Contract is entry-level.
‡ Contract initially takes effect in the 2026–27 season.

=== Trades ===
Date	Details		Ref
June 28, 2025	To Nashville Predators 5th-round pick in 2026	To Edmonton Oilers 5th-round pick in 2025	
July 1, 2025	To Boston Bruins Viktor Arvidsson	To Edmonton Oilers 5th-round pick in 2027	
July 8, 2025	To Tampa Bay Lightning Sam O'Reilly	To Edmonton Oilers Isaac Howard	
October 1, 2025	To Utah Mammoth Future considerations	To Edmonton Oilers Connor Ingram	
December 12, 2025	To Pittsburgh Penguins Stuart Skinner; Brett Kulak; 2nd-round pick in 2029	To Edmonton Oilers Tristan Jarry; Samuel Poulin	
December 12, 2025	To Nashville Predators 3rd-round pick in 2027	To Edmonton Oilers Spencer Stastney	
March 2, 2026	To Chicago Blackhawks 2nd-round pick in 2028	To Edmonton Oilers Connor Murphy	
March 4, 2026	To Chicago Blackhawks Andrew Mangiapane; Conditional 1st-round pick in 2027	To Edmonton Oilers Jason Dickinson; Colton Dach	
March 13, 2026	To Vancouver Canucks Jayden Grubbe	To Edmonton Oilers Josh Bloom	

=== Players acquired ===
Date	Player	Former team	Term	Via	Ref
July 1, 2025	Andrew Mangiapane	Washington Capitals	2-year	Free agency	
July 1, 2025	Riley Stillman	Carolina Hurricanes	2-year	Free agency	
July 1, 2025	Matt Tomkins	Tampa Bay Lightning	2-year	Free agency	
July 2, 2025	Curtis Lazar	New Jersey Devils	1-year	Free agency	
October 8, 2025	Jack Roslovic	Carolina Hurricanes	1-year	Free agency	
March 27, 2026	Tomas Cibulka	Motor Ceske Budejovice (ELH)	2-year†‡	Free agency	
April 2, 2026	Owen Michaels	Western Michigan Broncos (NCHC)	1-year†	Free agency	
May 25, 2026	Aku Raty	Oulun Kärpät (Liiga)	1-year‡	Free agency	

=== Players lost ===
Date	Player	New team	Term	Via	Ref
July 1, 2025	Ronnie Attard	Colorado Avalanche	1-year	Free agency	
July 1, 2025	Connor Brown	New Jersey Devils	4-year	Free agency	
July 1, 2025	John Klingberg	San Jose Sharks	1-year	Free agency	
July 1, 2025	Lane Pederson	Philadelphia Flyers	1-year	Free agency	
July 1, 2025	Corey Perry	Los Angeles Kings	1-year	Free agency	
July 2, 2025	Philip Kemp	Pittsburgh Penguins	2-year	Free agency	
July 11, 2025	Collin Delia	Brynäs IF (SHL)	1-year	Free agency	
July 11, 2025	Jeff Skinner	San Jose Sharks	1-year	Free agency	
August 13, 2025	Olivier Rodrigue	Barys Astana (KHL)	1-year	Free agency	
September 5, 2025	Derek Ryan			Retirement	
September 5, 2025	Cameron Wright	HPK (Liiga)	1-year	Free agency	
September 10, 2025	Jacob Perreault	Providence Bruins (AHL)	1-year	Free agency	
November 15, 2025	Troy Stecher	Toronto Maple Leafs		Waivers	
December 29, 2025	David Tomasek			Contract termination	
December 29, 2025	David Tomasek	Färjestad BK (SHL)	1-year	Free agency	
December 29, 2025	Noah Philp	Carolina Hurricanes		Waivers	
May 5, 2026	Roby Järventie	HC Ambrì-Piotta (NL)	1-year	Free agency	

=== Signings ===
Date	Player	Term	Ref
June 27, 2025	Trent Frederic	8-year	
June 30, 2025	Noah Philp	1-year	
June 30, 2025	Kasperi Kapanen	1-year	
June 30, 2025	Evan Bouchard	4-year	
July 8, 2025	Isaac Howard	3-year†	
September 23, 2025	Vasily Podkolzin	3-year‡	
October 6, 2025	Connor McDavid	2-year‡	
October 6, 2025	Jake Walman	7-year‡	
October 8, 2025	Mattias Ekholm	3-year‡	
January 12, 2026	Quinn Hutson	2-year‡	
February 2, 2026	Atro Leppanen	1-year‡	
April 1, 2026	William Nicholl	3-year‡	
June 18, 2026	Connor Ungar	1-year‡	
June 21, 2026	Jason Dickinson	5-year‡	
June 22, 2026	Connor Murphy	5-year‡	

== Draft picks ==
Below are the Edmonton Oilers' selections at the 2025 NHL entry draft, which were held on June 27 to 28, 2025. It was held at the Peacock Theater in Los Angeles.

Round	#	Player	Pos	Nationality	College/Junior/Club team (League)
3	83	Tommy Lafreniere	RW	Canada	Kamloops Blazers (WHL)
4	117	David Lewandowski	LW	Germany	Saskatoon Blades (WHL)
5	131	Asher Barnett	D	United States	U.S. NTDP (USHL)
6	191	Daniel Salonen	G	Finland	Lukko U20 (U20 SM-sarja)
7	223	Aidan Park	C	United States	Green Bay Gamblers (USHL)
