= Ryan Shea =

American ice hockey player (born 1997)

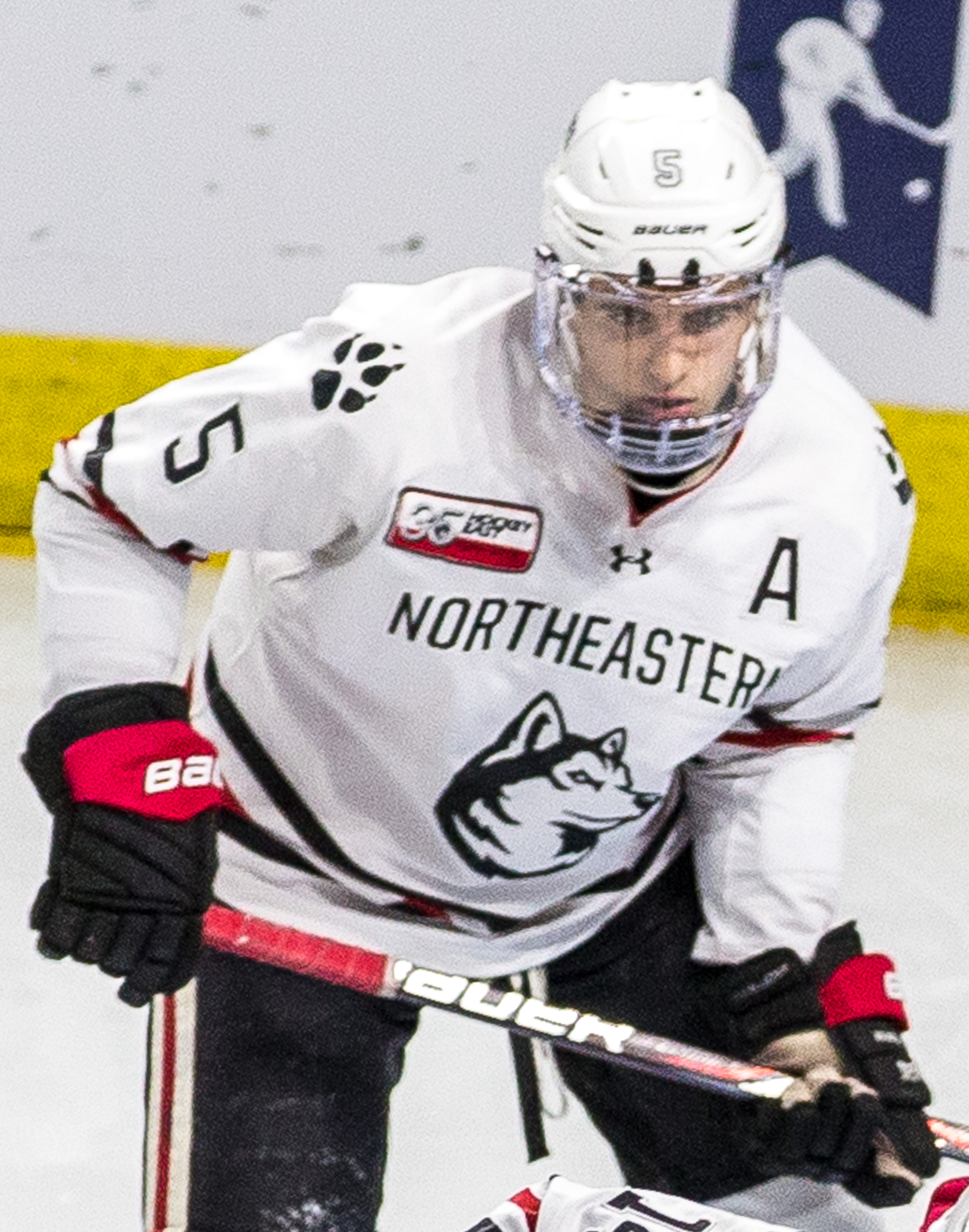
- Shea at Northeastern
- Born: February 11, 1997 (age 29) Milton, Massachusetts, U.S.
- Height: 6 ft 1 in (185 cm)
- Weight: 195 lb (88 kg; 13 st 13 lb)
- Position: Defense
- Shoots: Left
- NHL team Former teams: Edmonton Oilers; Pittsburgh Penguins
- National team: United States
- NHL draft: 121st overall, 2015; Chicago Blackhawks
- Playing career: 2021–present

Ryan Shea (born February 11, 1997) is an American professional ice hockey player who is a defenseman for the Edmonton Oilers of the National Hockey League (NHL).

== Playing career ==
Shea attended Boston College High School and played junior hockey with the Youngstown Phantoms of the United States Hockey League (USHL). He was selected by the Chicago Blackhawks in the fourth round, 121st overall, of the 2015 NHL entry draft. Shea suffered a broken collarbone twice during the 2015–16 USHL season with Youngstown.

Shea played college hockey with Northeastern of the Hockey East from 2016 to 2020. He scored his first collegiate goal on October 15, 2016, against Bentley. Shea served as an alternate captain for Northeastern during the 2018–19 season, before becoming Northeastern's captain in 2019–20 season. In November 2019, Shea was named MVP of the Friendship Four tournament. Shea was named a Hockey East Second-Team All-Star for the 2019–20 season.

After completing his tenure with Northeastern, Shea became a free agent and signed a two-year, entry-level contract with the Dallas Stars on August 19.

Shea played the 2021–22 AHL season with the Texas Stars of the American Hockey League (AHL).

On June 29, 2022, Shea signed a one-year contract extension with Dallas. Shea played the 2022–23 AHL season with Texas.

As a free agent, following three seasons within the Stars organization, Shea was signed to a one-year, $775,000 contract with the Pittsburgh Penguins on July 1, 2023. Shea made his NHL debut on October 21, 2023, in Pittsburgh's game against the St. Louis Blues. On April 4, 2024, Shea scored his first NHL goal, against Washington Capitals goaltender Charlie Lindgren in a 4–1 Penguins win.

On July 1, 2024, Shea signed another one-year contract with Pittsburgh. On March 7, 2025, Shea re-signed with the Penguins on a one-year contract through the 2025–26 NHL season.

On July 1, 2026, Shea signed a five-year, $20 million contract with the Edmonton Oilers.

== International play ==
Medal record

Men's ice hockey

Representing United States

World Championships
Bronze medal – third place	2021 Latvia	

Shea, after completing his first professional season, was added to the United States national team to compete in the 2021 IIHF World Championship in Riga, Latvia. He collected 1 assist in 3 games for the United States, helping collect a bronze medal in defeating Russia in the third-place playoff.

== Personal life ==
Shea was born to parents Dan and Kathy, and was raised with an older brother, Connor, and younger sisters, Christina and Kelly. Dan played hockey for Boston College.

== Career statistics ==
=== Regular season and playoffs ===
			Regular season					Playoffs
Season	Team	League	GP	G	A	Pts	PIM	GP	G	A	Pts	PIM
2012–13	Boston College High	USHS	23	3	9	12	14	—	—	—	—	—
2013–14	Boston College High	USHS	19	5	16	21	12	—	—	—	—	—
2014–15	Boston College High	USHS	22	6	29	35	18	—	—	—	—	—
2014–15	Youngstown Phantoms	USHL	2	0	0	0	0	—	—	—	—	—
2015–16	Youngstown Phantoms	USHL	28	2	5	7	32	—	—	—	—	—
2016–17	Northeastern University	HE	38	1	13	14	8	—	—	—	—	—
2017–18	Northeastern University	HE	38	1	16	17	24	—	—	—	—	—
2018–19	Northeastern University	HE	39	3	13	16	12	—	—	—	—	—
2019–20	Northeastern University	HE	34	5	26	31	10	—	—	—	—	—
2020–21	Texas Stars	AHL	27	0	6	6	10	—	—	—	—	—
2021–22	Texas Stars	AHL	66	3	29	32	23	2	0	0	0	0
2022–23	Texas Stars	AHL	70	7	21	28	36	8	0	4	4	6
2023–24	Pittsburgh Penguins	NHL	31	1	0	1	6	—	—	—	—	—
2023–24	Wilkes-Barre/Scranton Penguins	AHL	22	2	4	6	8	2	0	0	0	0
2024–25	Pittsburgh Penguins	NHL	39	2	3	5	14	—	—	—	—	—
2025–26	Pittsburgh Penguins	NHL	80	6	29	35	22	6	0	1	1	2
NHL totals			150	9	32	41	42	6	0	1	1	2

=== International ===
Year	Team	Event	Result	GP	G	A	Pts	PIM
2021	United States	WC	3rd place, bronze medalist(s)	3	0	1	1	0
Senior totals				3	0	1	1	0

== Awards and honours ==
Award	Year
USHS
All-USA Hockey Second Team	2015
College
HE Second All-Star Team	2020
(New England) D1 All-Stars	2020
