= Brett Kulak =

Canadian ice hockey player (born 1994)

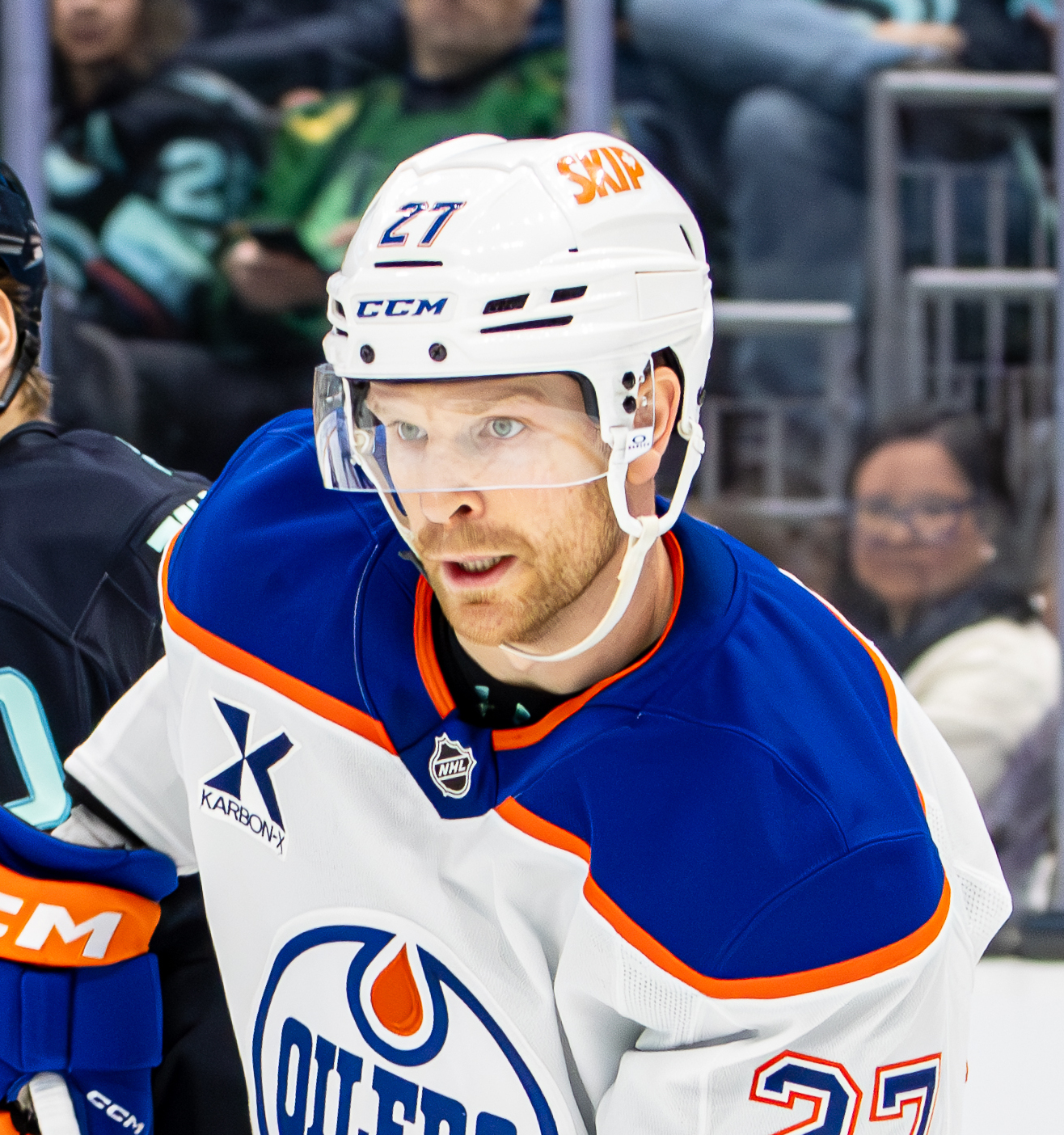
- Kulak with the Edmonton Oilers in 2025
- Born: January 6, 1994 (age 32) Stony Plain, Alberta, Canada
- Height: 6 ft 2 in (188 cm)
- Weight: 192 lb (87 kg; 13 st 10 lb)
- Position: Defence
- Shoots: Left
- NHL team Former teams: Colorado Avalanche; Calgary Flames; Montreal Canadiens; Edmonton Oilers; Pittsburgh Penguins
- NHL draft: 105th overall, 2012; Calgary Flames
- Playing career: 2013–present

Brett Kulak (born January 6, 1994) is a Canadian professional ice hockey player who is a defenceman for the Colorado Avalanche of the National Hockey League (NHL). He was selected in the fourth round, 105th overall, by the Calgary Flames in the 2012 NHL entry draft. Kulak has also previously played for the Montreal Canadiens, Edmonton Oilers, and Pittsburgh Penguins.

== Playing career ==
=== Junior ===
He was drafted 197th overall in the WHL Bantam Draft by the Vancouver Giants and played four seasons of junior hockey in the Western Hockey League (WHL) between 2010 and 2014. In 216 games with the Giants, he scored 35 goals and added 93 assists. The Calgary Flames selected Kulak with their fourth round pick, 105th overall, at the 2012 NHL entry draft. Following the conclusion of his WHL seasons in both 2012–13 and 2013–14, Kulak joined the Flames' American Hockey League (AHL) affiliate, the Abbotsford Heat, on amateur try-out agreements; he played four and six games in each respective season.

=== Calgary Flames ===
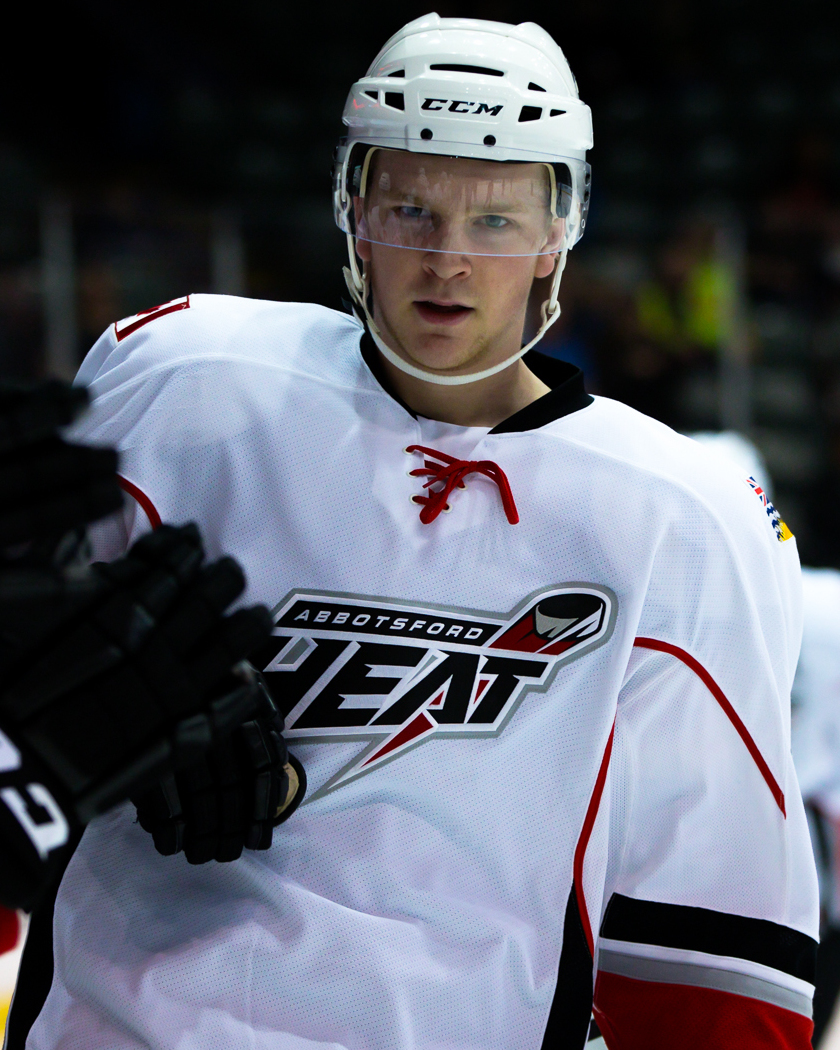
Kulak with the Abbotsford Heat in 2014.

On March 18, 2014, the Flames signed Kulak to a three-year, entry-level contract. He began the 2014–15 season with the ECHL's Colorado Eagles before earning a promotion to the AHL's Adirondack Flames. Kulak was then recalled to Calgary and made his NHL debut on April 11, 2015, in the Flames' final regular season game, a 5–1 loss to the Winnipeg Jets.

On October 18, 2016, against the Buffalo Sabres, Kulak recorded his first career point, assisting on Michael Frolík's first period goal. The Flames won the game 4–3. Kulak finished the 2016–17 season with 3 assists in 21 games.

On August 28, 2017, the Flames re-signed Kulak (who was a restricted free agent) to a one-year, two-way contract worth $650,000.

=== Montreal Canadiens ===
On October 1, 2018, the Flames traded Kulak to the Montreal Canadiens in exchange for Matt Taormina and Rinat Valiev. Kulak was subsequently assigned to the Canadiens' AHL affiliate, the Laval Rocket. On November 22, he was called up by the Canadiens after an injury to defenseman Noah Juulsen. He was immediately put into the line-up. A few games later, star defenseman Shea Weber was activated from injury reserve and the Canadiens sacrificed veteran defenseman Karl Alzner before Kulak by putting him on waivers. On December 29, 2018, Kulak scored his first goal for Montreal in a 5–6 defeat to the Tampa Bay Lightning. He scored his first game-winning goal in a 3–0 victory over the Colorado Avalanche on January 12, 2019.

On May 25, 2019, the Canadiens signed Kulak to a three-year, $5.55 million contract extension with an annual average of $1.85 million. Over the following seasons, Kulak typically played on the team's third pairing, notably participating in the Canadiens' deep run to the 2021 Stanley Cup Finals. In the final season of his contract, Kulak assumed an increasingly important role in the team's defence group, as a result of departures and injuries to other key players. With the Canadiens entering a period of team restructuring under the new management of Jeff Gorton and Kent Hughes there was some speculation as to whether the team would seek to re-sign Kulak or explore trading him. On March 19, 2022, he played what would prove to be his final game as a Canadien, scoring a goal in a 5–1 rout of the Ottawa Senators.

=== Edmonton Oilers ===
In advance of the NHL trade deadline, Kulak was dealt to the Edmonton Oilers on March 21, 2022 in exchange for defenceman William Lagesson, a conditional second-round draft pick (Lane Hutson, 2022) and a seventh-round pick in 2024 and the Canadiens retaining 50% of Kulak's salary for the remainder of the season. Kulak registered 2 goals and 6 assists in 18 regular season games with the Oilers to close out the 2021–22 season, before the team entered the 2022 Stanley Cup playoffs. Kulak's contributions were well-received on the team, and he played primarily as a pair with defenceman Tyson Barrie, credited with boosting Barrie's effectiveness. Kulak missed the morning practice the day of the pivotal Game 7 in the Oilers' first round matchup with the Los Angeles Kings, as he was attending the birth of his daughter, but was able to participate in the game itself that saw the Oilers advance to the second round against the Calgary Flames. The Oilers reached the Western Conference Final, losing to the Colorado Avalanche in four games. Following the end of the season, Kulak signed a new four-year, $11 million contract with the Oilers.

=== Pittsburgh Penguins ===
On December 12, 2025, following a middling start to the Oilers' season by the team for the third year in a row, the Oilers traded Kulak, goaltender Stuart Skinner, and a 2029 second-round draft pick to the Pittsburgh Penguins in exchange for goaltender Tristan Jarry and forward Samuel Poulin.

=== Colorado Avalanche ===
After only two months with Pittsburgh, Kulak was traded to the Colorado Avalanche on February 24, 2026, in exchange for Sam Girard and a second-round pick in 2028. He became the first player in NHL history to play at least 25 games with three different teams in a single season. During the 2026 Stanley Cup playoffs, he scored his first playoff game-winning goal during overtime of game 5 of the Avalanche's second-round series against the Minnesota Wild.

== Personal life ==
Kulak grew up on a farm near Stony Plain, Alberta, with his parents Gil and Laura and older brothers Tyson and Kyle, playing with the Stony Plain and Spruce Grove Minor Hockey Association.

Kulak and his wife have two children.

== Career statistics ==
			Regular season					Playoffs
Season	Team	League	GP	G	A	Pts	PIM	GP	G	A	Pts	PIM
2010–11	Vancouver Giants	WHL	3	0	0	0	0	—	—	—	—	—
2011–12	Vancouver Giants	WHL	72	9	15	24	28	6	0	4	4	2
2012–13	Vancouver Giants	WHL	72	12	32	44	34	—	—	—	—	—
2012–13	Abbotsford Heat	AHL	4	0	0	0	0	—	—	—	—	—
2013–14	Vancouver Giants	WHL	69	14	46	60	51	4	1	2	3	7
2013–14	Abbotsford Heat	AHL	6	1	2	3	2	4	0	0	0	2
2014–15	Adirondack Flames	AHL	26	4	9	13	27	—	—	—	—	—
2014–15	Colorado Eagles	ECHL	39	9	21	30	15	—	—	—	—	—
2014–15	Calgary Flames	NHL	1	0	0	0	2	—	—	—	—	—
2015–16	Calgary Flames	NHL	8	0	0	0	0	—	—	—	—	—
2015–16	Stockton Heat	AHL	59	3	14	17	36	—	—	—	—	—
2016–17	Calgary Flames	NHL	21	0	3	3	12	—	—	—	—	—
2016–17	Stockton Heat	AHL	22	2	8	10	14	5	0	4	4	4
2017–18	Calgary Flames	NHL	71	2	6	8	27	—	—	—	—	—
2018–19	Laval Rocket	AHL	19	3	8	11	4	—	—	—	—	—
2018–19	Montreal Canadiens	NHL	57	6	11	17	31	—	—	—	—	—
2019–20	Montreal Canadiens	NHL	56	0	7	7	12	10	0	3	3	0
2020–21	Montreal Canadiens	NHL	46	2	6	8	20	13	0	1	1	4
2021–22	Montreal Canadiens	NHL	56	3	10	13	33	—	—	—	—	—
2021–22	Edmonton Oilers	NHL	18	2	6	8	12	16	0	5	5	12
2022–23	Edmonton Oilers	NHL	82	3	17	20	41	12	1	1	2	9
2023–24	Edmonton Oilers	NHL	82	3	13	16	30	25	1	7	8	14
2024–25	Edmonton Oilers	NHL	82	7	18	25	18	22	1	4	5	8
2025–26	Edmonton Oilers	NHL	31	0	2	2	10	—	—	—	—	—
2025–26	Pittsburgh Penguins	NHL	25	1	6	7	18	—	—	—	—	—
2025–26	Colorado Avalanche	NHL	27	0	3	3	10	13	1	4	5	6
NHL totals			663	29	108	137	276	111	4	25	29	53

== Awards and honours ==
Award	Year	Ref
WHL
CHL/NHL Top Prospects Game	2012	
