= Stuart Skinner =

Canadian ice hockey player (born 1998)

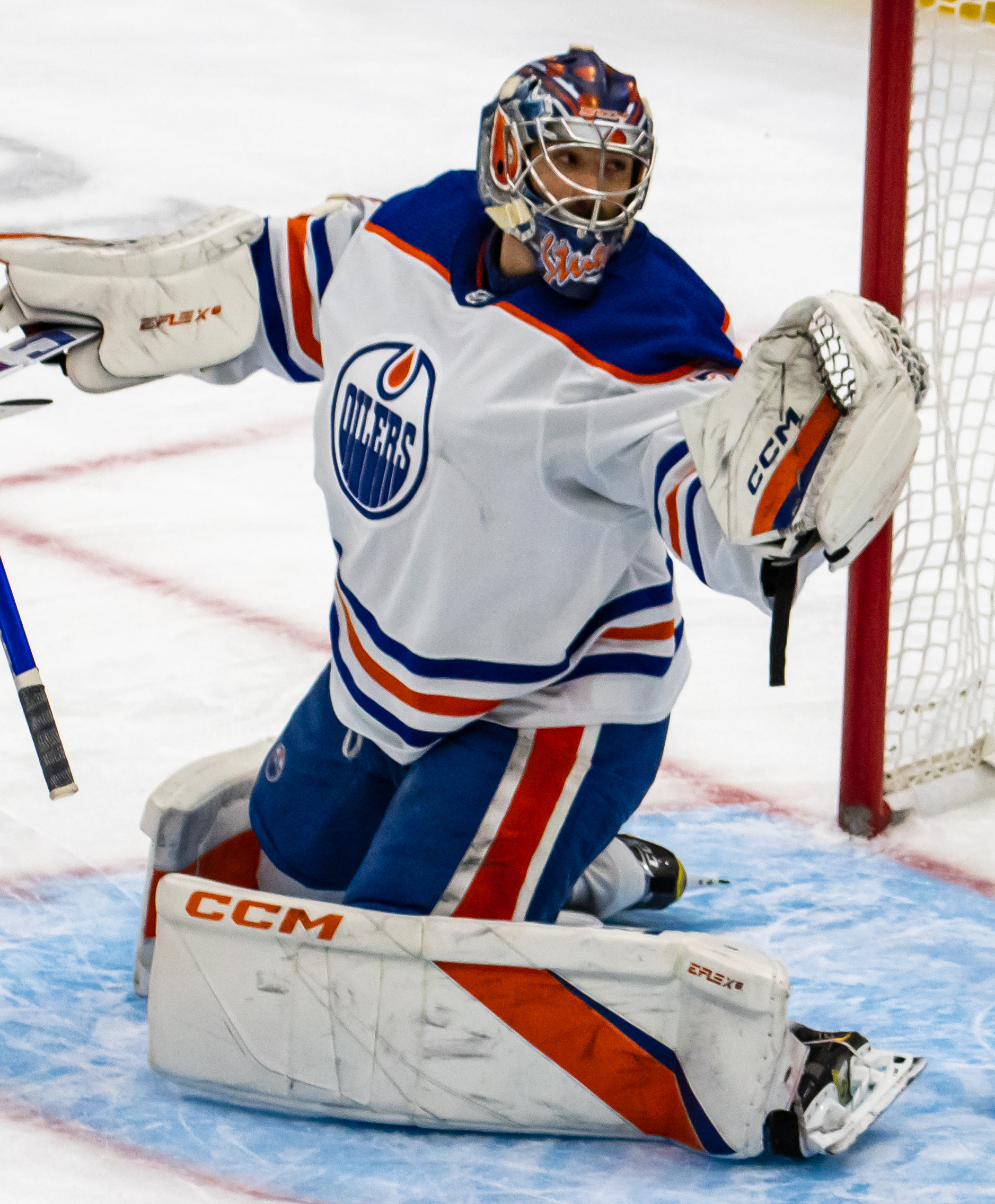
- Skinner with the Edmonton Oilers in 2023
- Born: November 1, 1998 (age 27) Edmonton, Alberta, Canada
- Height: 6 ft 4 in (193 cm)
- Weight: 215 lb (98 kg; 15 st 5 lb)
- Position: Goaltender
- Caught: Left
- NHL team Former teams: Winnipeg Jets; Edmonton Oilers; Pittsburgh Penguins
- NHL draft: 78th overall, 2017; Edmonton Oilers
- Playing career: 2018–present

Stuart Daniel Skinner (born November 1, 1998) is a Canadian professional ice hockey player who is a goaltender for the Winnipeg Jets of the National Hockey League (NHL). He was selected in the third round, 78th overall, in the 2017 NHL entry draft by the Edmonton Oilers, with whom he played parts of five seasons before being traded to the Pittsburgh Penguins in 2025.

== Playing career ==
Skinner was born and raised in Edmonton, and played minor ice hockey at the South Side Athletic Club (SSAC), including overlapping seasons on the SSAC Lions of the Alberta Major Bantam Hockey League (AMBHL) with future Edmonton Oilers teammates Tyler Benson (two SSAC seasons) and James Hamblin (one SSAC season).

=== Junior ===
Skinner played major junior hockey in the Western Hockey League with the Lethbridge Hurricanes and Swift Current Broncos.

On March 18, 2016, Skinner scored an empty net goal with the Lethbridge Hurricanes against the Medicine Hat Tigers, making him the only goaltender in franchise history and the seventh in WHL history to do so.

=== Professional ===
==== Edmonton Oilers (2020–2025) ====
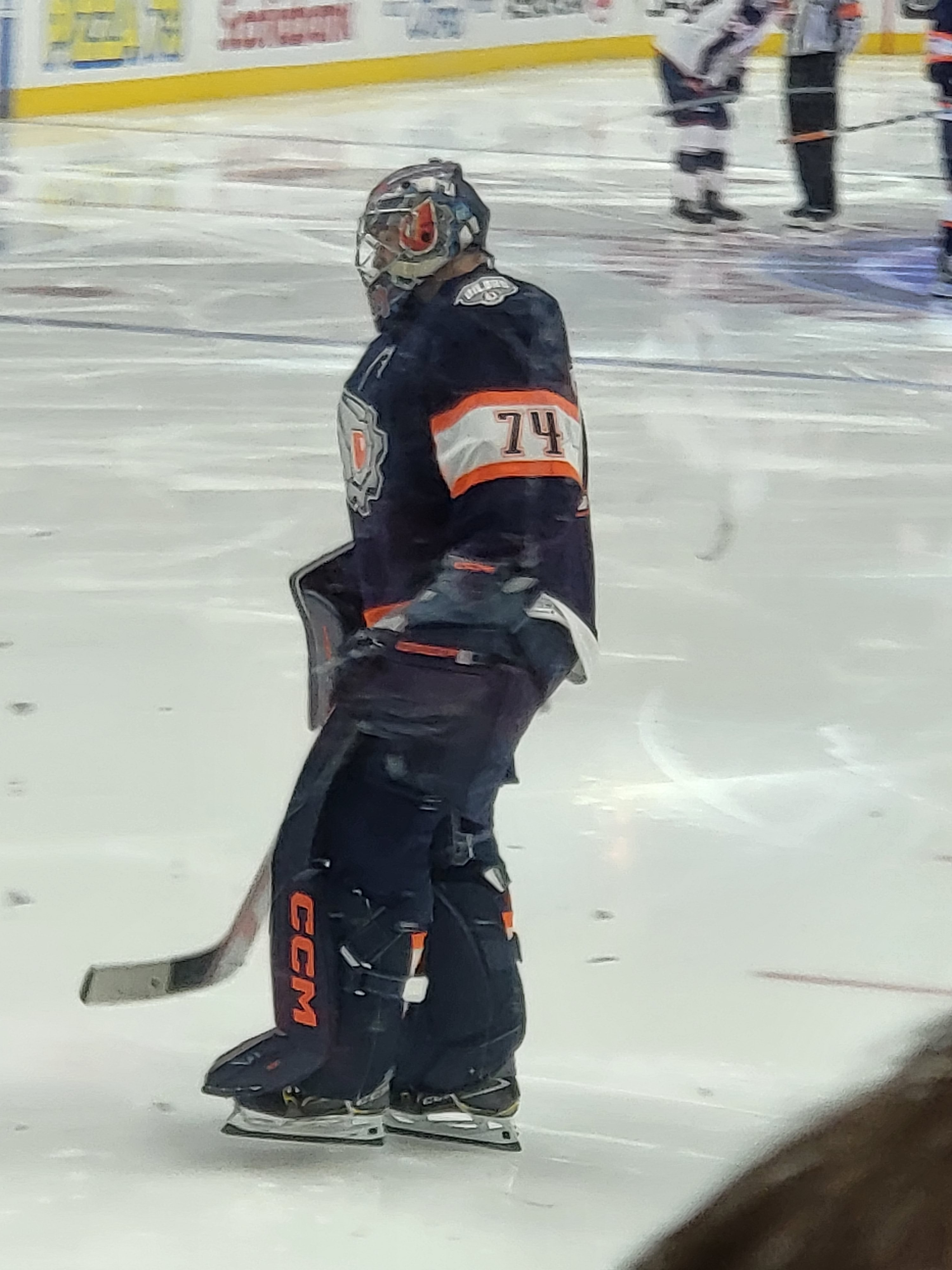
Skinner with the Edmonton Oilers in 2023.

After his selection in the 2017 NHL entry draft, Skinner was later signed to a three-year, entry-level contract with the Edmonton Oilers on May 14, 2018.

Entering the final year of his entry-level contract, Skinner remained on the Oilers roster to start the pandemic-delayed 2020–21 season. With an injury to veteran Mike Smith, Skinner served as the Oilers' backup to Mikko Koskinen through the first 9 games. He made his NHL debut and first career start on January 31, 2021, against the Ottawa Senators, collecting his first win in an 8–5 victory. Skinner would spend the remainder of the season with the Bakersfield Condors of the American Hockey League (AHL). He would lead all goaltenders in wins with 20, and helped backstop Bakersfield to the Pacific Division Championship.

Skinner would split the 2021–22 season between the AHL and the NHL. On February 14, 2022, Skinner recorded his first NHL shutout against the San Jose Sharks, making 20 saves to win the game 3–0.

During the 2022–23 season, with the departure of Mikko Koskinen and injury to Mike Smith, Skinner was initially expected to be the backup to newly-signed goaltender Jack Campbell. Skinner's strong play, along with Campbell's struggling performance, led Skinner to take over the starter position. On January 19, 2023, the NHL announced Skinner as one of three final players of the Pacific Division voted in the 2023 NHL All-Star Game, along with teammate Leon Draisaitl. Skinner ultimately appeared in 50 games in the regular season, recording a 29–14–5 record with a .914 save percentage. He was voted a finalist for the Calder Memorial Trophy, the NHL's Rookie of the Year award.

The beginning of the Oilers' 2023–24 season got off to a less than ideal start. The team started the season poorly, going 3–9–1, their worst start since the 1993–94 season. With Skinner's early struggles and Campbell's poor play continuing from the previous season, Campbell was waived by the Oilers on November 7, 2023, for the purpose of assigning him to the American Hockey League. Campbell's demotion effectively made Skinner the defacto starting goaltender for the Oilers. After Campbell cleared waivers, the Oilers would then recall Calvin Pickard from Bakersfield, on November 8. Four days later, the Oilers fired then-head coach Jay Woodcroft and replaced him with Kris Knoblauch, on November 12. The team's fortunes soon experienced an eventual rejuvenation in their performance, leading to a significant rebound and ultimately achieving a record of 46 wins, 18 losses, and 5 overtime losses under the leadership of Knoblauch. This includes a franchise-high 16-game winning streak, setting a new Canadian and franchise record, which during this time, Skinner recorded his 11th consecutive win, beating the franchise record of 10, previously held by Grant Fuhr, on January 23, 2024.

==== Pittsburgh Penguins (2025–2026) ====
Following a middling start to the Oilers' season by the team for the third year in a row, Skinner was traded to the Pittsburgh Penguins on December 12, 2025, along with defenceman Brett Kulak and a 2029 second-round pick, in exchange for goaltender Tristan Jarry and forward Samuel Poulin. At the time of the trade, Skinner had an 11–8–4 record through 23 games, two shutouts, a 2.83 GAA and a .891 save percentage.

Skinner played his first game with the Penguins on December 16, which coincidentally happened to be against the Oilers. The Penguins lost 6–4, with Skinner making 17 saves.

==== Winnipeg Jets (2026–present) ====
On July 1, 2026, Skinner signed a two-year, $7.5 million contract with the Winnipeg Jets.

== Personal life ==
Skinner is the youngest of nine siblings, all of whom have first names that begin with the letter "S". He met his wife, Chloe, after a WHL game he played in Lethbridge; they married in June 2020. Their first son, Beau, was born in 2023 and their second son, Darcy, was born in 2025.

== Career statistics ==
=== Regular season and playoffs ===
| | | | Regular season | | | | | | | | | Playoffs |
| Season | Team | League | GP | W | L | OTL | MIN | GA | SO | GAA | SV% | GP | W | L | MIN | GA | SO | GAA | SV% |
|---|---|---|---|---|---|---|---|---|---|---|---|---|---|---|---|---|---|---|---|
| 2011–12 | SSAC Lions | AMBHL | 18 | — | — | — | — | — | — | 2.59 | .910 | 11 | — | — | — | — | — | 2.60 | .900 |
| 2012–13 | SSAC Lions | AMBHL | 21 | — | — | — | — | — | — | 1.75 | .929 | 11 | — | — | — | — | — | 1.45 | .947 |
| 2013–14 | Lethbridge Hurricanes | WHL | 4 | 0 | 3 | 0 | 197 | 17 | 0 | 5.17 | .866 | — | — | — | — | — | — | — | — |
| 2014–15 | Lethbridge Hurricanes | WHL | 43 | 13 | 20 | 5 | 2,327 | 143 | 1 | 3.69 | .909 | — | — | — | — | — | — | — | — |
| 2015–16 | Lethbridge Hurricanes | WHL | 44 | 27 | 10 | 1 | 2,238 | 102 | 3 | 2.73 | .920 | 4 | 1 | 3 | 191 | 12 | 0 | 3.76 | .862 |
| 2016–17 | Lethbridge Hurricanes | WHL | 60 | 34 | 18 | 2 | 3,386 | 184 | 2 | 3.26 | .905 | 20 | 10 | 10 | 1,243 | 64 | 0 | 3.09 | .916 |
| 2017–18 | Lethbridge Hurricanes | WHL | 31 | 14 | 15 | 0 | 1,737 | 98 | 4 | 3.38 | .897 | — | — | — | — | — | — | — | — |
| 2017–18 | Swift Current Broncos | WHL | 25 | 16 | 6 | 1 | 1,433 | 64 | 2 | 2.68 | .914 | 26 | 16 | 10 | 1,609 | 59 | 6 | 2.20 | .932 |
| 2018–19 | Wichita Thunder | ECHL | 41 | 15 | 14 | 7 | 2,260 | 119 | 4 | 3.16 | .903 | — | — | — | — | — | — | — | — |
| 2018–19 | Bakersfield Condors | AHL | 6 | 4 | 2 | 0 | 362 | 18 | 0 | 2.99 | .879 | 4 | 2 | 1 | 175 | 7 | 0 | 2.39 | .918 |
| 2019–20 | Bakersfield Condors | AHL | 41 | 16 | 17 | 6 | 2,267 | 125 | 1 | 3.31 | .892 | — | — | — | — | — | — | — | — |
| 2019–20 | Wichita Thunder | ECHL | 3 | 2 | 1 | 0 | 182 | 11 | 0 | 3.62 | .894 | — | — | — | — | — | — | — | — |
| 2020–21 | Edmonton Oilers | NHL | 1 | 1 | 0 | 0 | 60 | 5 | 0 | 5.03 | .868 | — | — | — | — | — | — | — | — |
| 2020–21 | Bakersfield Condors | AHL | 31 | 20 | 9 | 1 | 1,787 | 125 | 2 | 2.38 | .914 | 6 | 4 | 2 | 336 | 15 | 0 | 2.68 | .907 |
| 2021–22 | Bakersfield Condors | AHL | 35 | 22 | 7 | 5 | 2,088 | 77 | 5 | 2.21 | .920 | 5 | 2 | 3 | 298 | 14 | 0 | 2.82 | .911 |
| 2021–22 | Edmonton Oilers | NHL | 13 | 6 | 6 | 0 | 735 | 32 | 1 | 2.62 | .913 | — | — | — | — | — | — | — | — |
| 2022–23 | Edmonton Oilers | NHL | 50 | 29 | 14 | 5 | 2,904 | 133 | 1 | 2.75 | .914 | 12 | 5 | 6 | 619 | 38 | 0 | 3.68 | .883 |
| 2023–24 | Edmonton Oilers | NHL | 59 | 36 | 16 | 5 | 3,362 | 147 | 2 | 2.62 | .905 | 23 | 14 | 9 | 1,373 | 56 | 1 | 2.45 | .901 |
| 2024–25 | Edmonton Oilers | NHL | 51 | 26 | 18 | 4 | 2,942 | 138 | 3 | 2.81 | .896 | 15 | 7 | 7 | 881 | 44 | 3 | 2.99 | .889 |
| 2025–26 | Edmonton Oilers | NHL | 23 | 11 | 8 | 4 | 1,317 | 62 | 2 | 2.83 | .891 | — | — | — | — | — | — | — | — |
| 2025–26 | Pittsburgh Penguins | NHL | 27 | 12 | 9 | 5 | 1,605 | 80 | 0 | 2.99 | .885 | 3 | 0 | 3 | 175 | 9 | 0 | 3.08 | .873 |
| NHL totals | | | 224 | 121 | 71 | 23 | 12,923 | 597 | 9 | 2.77 | .902 | 53 | 26 | 25 | 3,049 | 147 | 4 | 2.89 | .892 |

=== International ===
| Year | Team | Event | Result | GP | W | L | T | MIN | GA | SO | GAA | SV% |
|---|---|---|---|---|---|---|---|---|---|---|---|---|
| 2014 | Canada Black | U17 | 7th | 3 | 1 | 2 | 0 | 177 | 12 | 0 | 4.05 | .831 |
| 2016 | Canada | U18 | 4th | 3 | 2 | 0 | 0 | 127 | 6 | 0 | 2.82 | .860 |
| Junior totals | | | | 6 | 3 | 2 | 0 | 304 | 18 | 0 | 3.55 | .849 |

== Awards and honours ==
| Award | Year | Ref |
AMBHL
| Champion (SSAC Lions) | 2012 | |
| Best GAA (1.75) | 2013 | |
| Top Goaltender | 2013 | |
WHL
| Ed Chynoweth Cup champion | 2018 | |
NHL
| NHL All-Star Game | 2023 | |
| NHL All-Rookie Team | 2023 | |
