= Connor Ingram =

Canadian ice hockey player (born 1997)

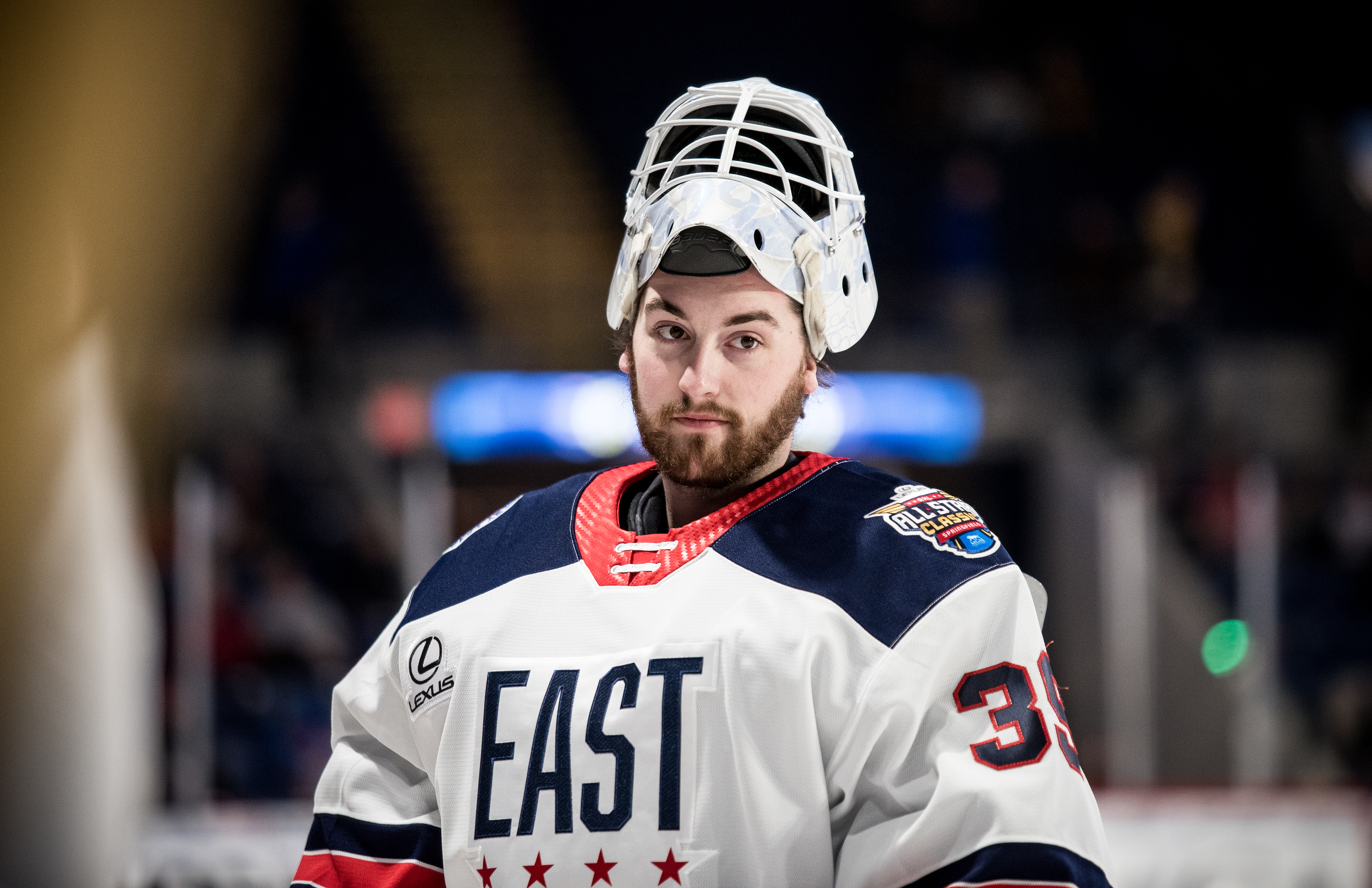
- Ingram at the 2019 AHL All-Star Game
- Born: March 31, 1997 (age 29) Saskatoon, Saskatchewan, Canada
- Height: 6 ft 2 in (188 cm)
- Weight: 188 lb (85 kg; 13 st 6 lb)
- Position: Goaltender
- Caught: Left
- Played for: Nashville Predators; Arizona Coyotes; Utah Hockey Club; Edmonton Oilers
- NHL draft: 88th overall, 2016; Tampa Bay Lightning
- Playing career: 2017–2026

Connor Brent Ingram (born March 31, 1997) is a Canadian former professional ice hockey player. A goaltender, he was drafted in the third round, 88th overall, by the Tampa Bay Lightning at the 2016 NHL entry draft, and played in the National Hockey League (NHL) for the Nashville Predators, Arizona Coyotes, Utah Hockey Club, and Edmonton Oilers.

== Playing career ==
=== Junior ===
Ingram has stated that he was cut from his Bantam AA team at age 14, having begun playing goal only two years earlier, and that he was not widely regarded as a prospect during his early development.

After playing at various levels of youth hockey, he joined the Kamloops Blazers of the Western Hockey League for the 2014–15 WHL season. He appeared in 52 games, posting a 21–21–5 record, along with a .904 save percentage and 2.96 goals against average. In the 2015–16 WHL season, Ingram helped lead the Blazers to a playoff appearance. He had a much larger role on the team, appearing in 61 games, recording 4 shutouts, and posting a 34–15–9 record with a .922 save percentage and a 2.61 goals allowed average. Despite his efforts, the Blazers were eliminated in the first round by the Kelowna Rockets.

Following the 2015–16 WHL season, Ingram was drafted in the third round, 88th overall, by the Tampa Bay Lightning.

Ingram started the 2016–17 WHL season with the Blazers. He played in 45 games with the Blazers, posting a 26–14–2 record along with a .927 save percentage and a 2.44 goals allowed average. The Blazers qualified for the playoffs once again but were again eliminated by Kelowna in the first round.

=== Professional ===
==== Tampa Bay Lightning ====
On April 4, 2017, Ingram and the Lightning agreed on a three-year, entry-level contract. He was also signed to an amateur try out with the Syracuse Crunch on the same day. He did not make an appearance with the Crunch for the rest of their season.

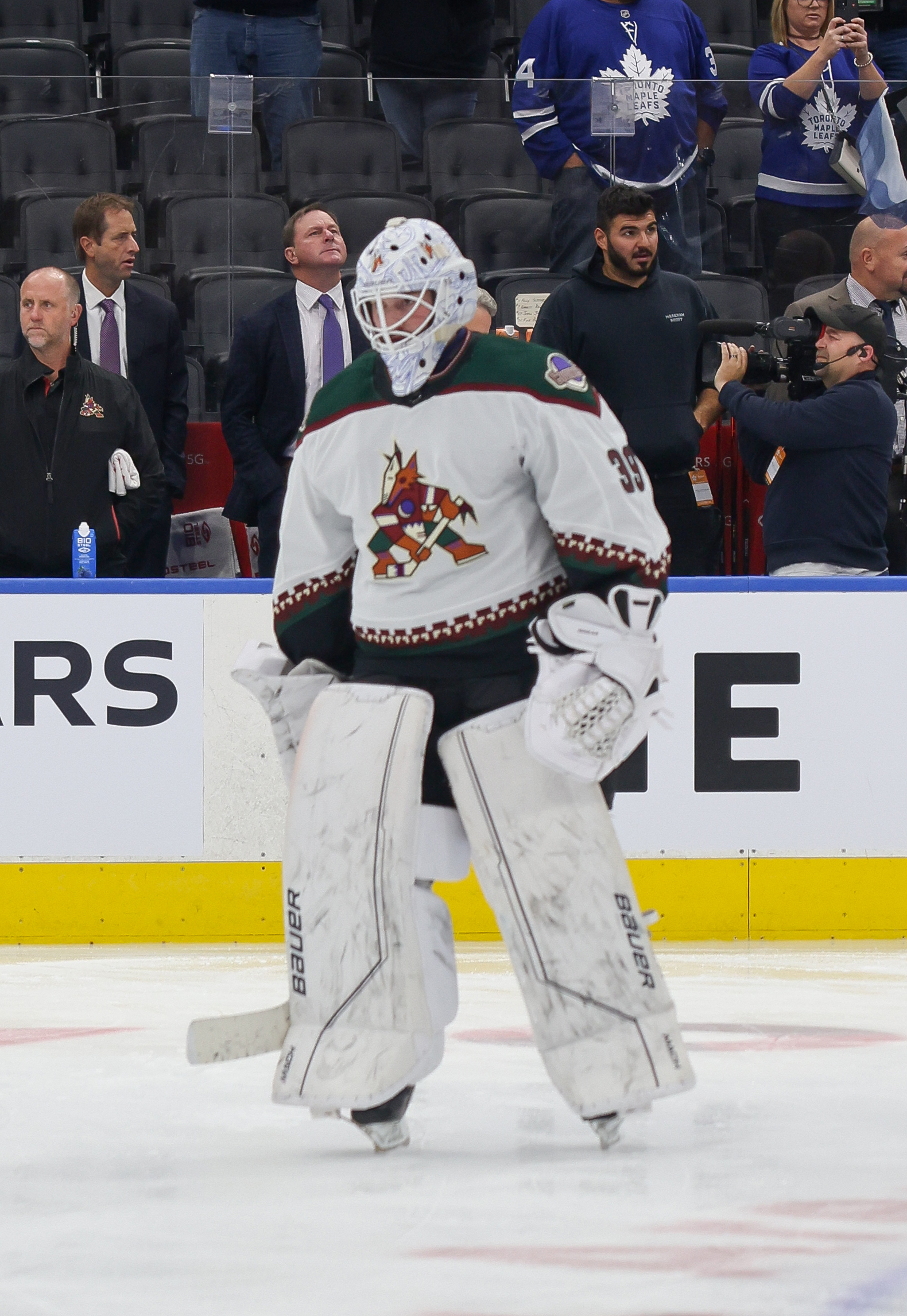
Ingram playing against the Toronto Maple Leafs on October 17, 2022

Ingram made his professional debut on October 7, 2017, with the Crunch. He made 15 saves on 18 shots in an overtime loss to the Rochester Americans. Ingram recorded his first professional win three weeks later on October 21. He stopped 23 of 24 shots in a 4–1 Crunch win over the Springfield Thunderbirds. On December 9, 2017, Ingram stopped all 18 shots he faced to record his professional shutout over the Belleville Senators. Ingram would finish the regular season with a 20–11–2 record with four shutouts along with a .914 save percentage and 2.33 goals allowed average to help lead the Crunch to the 2018 Calder Cup playoffs. He would split time with Edward Pasquale in the playoffs, posting a 1–3 record with a .904 save percentage and 3.07 goals allowed average. The Crunch would be eliminated in the second round by the eventual Calder Cup champions, the Toronto Marlies.

Ingram spent the 2018–19 season split between the Syracuse Crunch and the Orlando Solar Bears, the ECHL affiliate of the Lightning. In his time with the Crunch, he was an AHL All-Star, posting a 14–7–0 record with six shutouts, a .922 save percentage, and 2.26 goals allowed average. In his time with the Solar Bears, Ingram posted an 8–2–0 record with a .914 save percentage and 2.81 goals allowed average. In 10 playoff games with the Solar Bears, he posted a 5–2–3 record along with a .935 save percentage and a 1.94 goals allowed average. The Solar Bears would be eliminated in the second round by the Florida Everblades.

==== Nashville Predators ====
On June 14, 2019, the Nashville Predators announced that they had acquired Ingram in exchange for a seventh-round pick in the 2021 NHL entry draft.

On October 24, 2021, Ingram recorded his first NHL win with the Predators, making 33 saves in a 5–2 win over the Minnesota Wild. Ingram's first win came nearly 9 months after entering the league's player assistance program.

==== Arizona Coyotes ====
On October 10, 2022, Ingram was claimed off waivers by the Arizona Coyotes. During the 2022–23 season on February 15, 2023, Ingram recorded his first NHL shutout in a 1–0 shootout win against the Tampa Bay Lightning, while making 47 saves and setting the NHL record for saves by a rookie in their first career shutout.

Following his first full season in the NHL, establishing career highs in wins and appearances, Ingram was re-signed by the Coyotes to a three-year, $5.85 million contract extension on June 25, 2023. The 2023–24 season was successful for Ingram, who managed a 23–21–3 record with a .907 save percentage. He tied for the NHL lead in shutouts (6). In recognition of his mental health struggles, he received the Bill Masterton Memorial Trophy, awarded by the Professional Hockey Writers' Association to the player who "best exemplifies the qualities of perseverance, sportsmanship and dedication to hockey."

==== Utah Hockey Club ====
Shortly after the end of the 2023–24 regular season, the Coyotes' franchise was suspended and team assets were subsequently transferred to the expansion Utah Hockey Club; as a result, Ingram became a member of the Utah team. In doing so, Ingram became the last member of the Coyotes franchise to win a major NHL award, while actively playing for the team (although the Coyotes had already become inactive by the time that Ingram was awarded the Bill Masterton Memorial Trophy).

Ingram was Utah's primary goaltender for part of the 2024–25 season, averaging 3.27 goals allowed per game and a save percentage of .882. He was placed on injured reserve on November 19, 2024, with what the team termed an upper-body injury, and did not make another appearance until a home game against the New York Islanders on January 10, 2025.

==== Edmonton Oilers and retirement ====
On September 17, 2025, the now-Utah Mammoth announced that Ingram would be placed on waivers and would not join the team for training camp, as Ingram and the team agreed to part ways. After clearing waivers, Ingram was traded to the Edmonton Oilers on October 1, in exchange for future considerations. He was called up from the Bakersfield Condors of the AHL on December 19, 2025, when the Oilers goaltender Tristan Jarry was placed on injured reserve. Ingram made his first NHL start in 11 months on December 21, making 28 saves in a 4–3 win over the Vegas Golden Knights. He remained with the team as a backup following Jarry's return from injury, and together, they regularly exchanged starts before Ingram was confirmed on March 15, 2026, by coach Kris Knoblauch to be the Oilers' starting goaltender for the remainder of the 2025–26 season, as Jarry suffered a string of inconsistent performances. Making his first playoff start in four years, he secured his first playoff victory in game 1 of the team's first round series against the Anaheim Ducks, making 25 saves in a 4–3 win for the Oilers.

On September 11, 2026, Ingram announced his retirement from professional hockey.

== Personal life ==
Ingram was born in Saskatoon, Saskatchewan, but was raised in Imperial, Saskatchewan. His older brother, Bryce, played college baseball at Valley City State University.

In 2021, it was revealed that Ingram had been living with undiagnosed obsessive–compulsive disorder (OCD) and depression, which led him to suffer from alcoholism and being obsessed with the possibility of contamination. Ingram has said his fear of infection was the reason why he refused to give high fives to fans hanging over the glass.

== Career statistics ==
=== Regular season and playoffs ===
			Regular season									Playoffs
Season	Team	League	GP	W	L	OTL	MIN	GA	SO	GAA	SV%	GP	W	L	MIN	GA	SO	GAA	SV%
2013–14	Flin Flon Bombers	SJHL	2	0	1	0	68	3	0	2.63	.932	—	—	—	—	—	—	—	—
2014–15	Kamloops Blazers	WHL	52	21	21	5	1,349	144	3	2.96	.904	—	—	—	—	—	—	—	—
2015–16	Kamloops Blazers	WHL	61	34	15	9	3,539	154	4	2.61	.922	7	3	4	424	15	1	2.12	.938
2016–17	Kamloops Blazers	WHL	45	26	14	4	2,577	105	5	2.44	.927	6	2	4	357	13	0	2.18	.946
2017–18	Syracuse Crunch	AHL	35	20	11	6	1,983	77	4	2.33	.914	4	1	3	274	14	0	3.07	.904
2017–18	Adirondack Thunder	ECHL	3	2	0	1	185	4	0	1.30	.960	—	—	—	—	—	—	—	—
2018–19	Syracuse Crunch	AHL	22	14	7	0	1,303	49	6	2.26	.922	—	—	—	—	—	—	—	—
2018–19	Orlando Solar Bears	ECHL	13	8	2	0	705	33	1	2.81	.914	10	5	8	681	22	0	1.94	.935
2019–20	Milwaukee Admirals	AHL	33	21	5	5	1,906	61	2	1.92	.933	—	—	—	—	—	—	—	—
2020–21	IF Björklöven	Allsv	9	5	4	0	526	22	1	2.51	.898	—	—	—	—	—	—	—	—
2020–21	Chicago Wolves	AHL	5	1	3	1	293	17	0	3.48	.899	—	—	—	—	—	—	—	—
2021–22	Nashville Predators	NHL	3	1	2	0	178	11	0	3.71	.879	4	0	3	231	14	0	3.64	.913
2021–22	Milwaukee Admirals	AHL	54	30	17	7	3,195	144	5	2.70	.915	4	1	3	190	18	0	5.69	.835
2022–23	Arizona Coyotes	NHL	27	6	13	8	1,587	89	1	3.37	.907	—	—	—	—	—	—	—	—
2023–24	Arizona Coyotes	NHL	50	23	21	3	2,803	136	6	2.91	.907	—	—	—	—	—	—	—	—
2024–25	Utah Hockey Club	NHL	22	9	8	4	1,210	66	0	3.27	.882	—	—	—	—	—	—	—	—
2024–25	Tucson Roadrunners	AHL	1	1	0	0	60	1	0	1.00	.967	—	—	—	—	—	—	—	—
2025–26	Bakersfield Condors	AHL	11	4	5	2	639	43	0	4.04	.856	—	—	—	—	—	—	—	—
2025–26	Edmonton Oilers	NHL	32	16	10	3	1,778	77	2	2.60	.899	5	2	3	295	19	0	3.86	.876
NHL totals			134	55	54	18	7,555	379	9	3.01	.901	9	2	6	526	33	0	3.76	.895

== Awards and honors ==
Award	Year	Ref
WHL
West Second All-Star Team	2016, 2017	
AHL
All-Star Game	2019, 2020	
Second All-Star Team	2020	
Harry "Hap" Holmes Memorial Award	2020	
NHL
Bill Masterton Memorial Trophy	2024	
