= Sam Poulin (ice hockey) =

Canadian ice hockey player (born 2001)

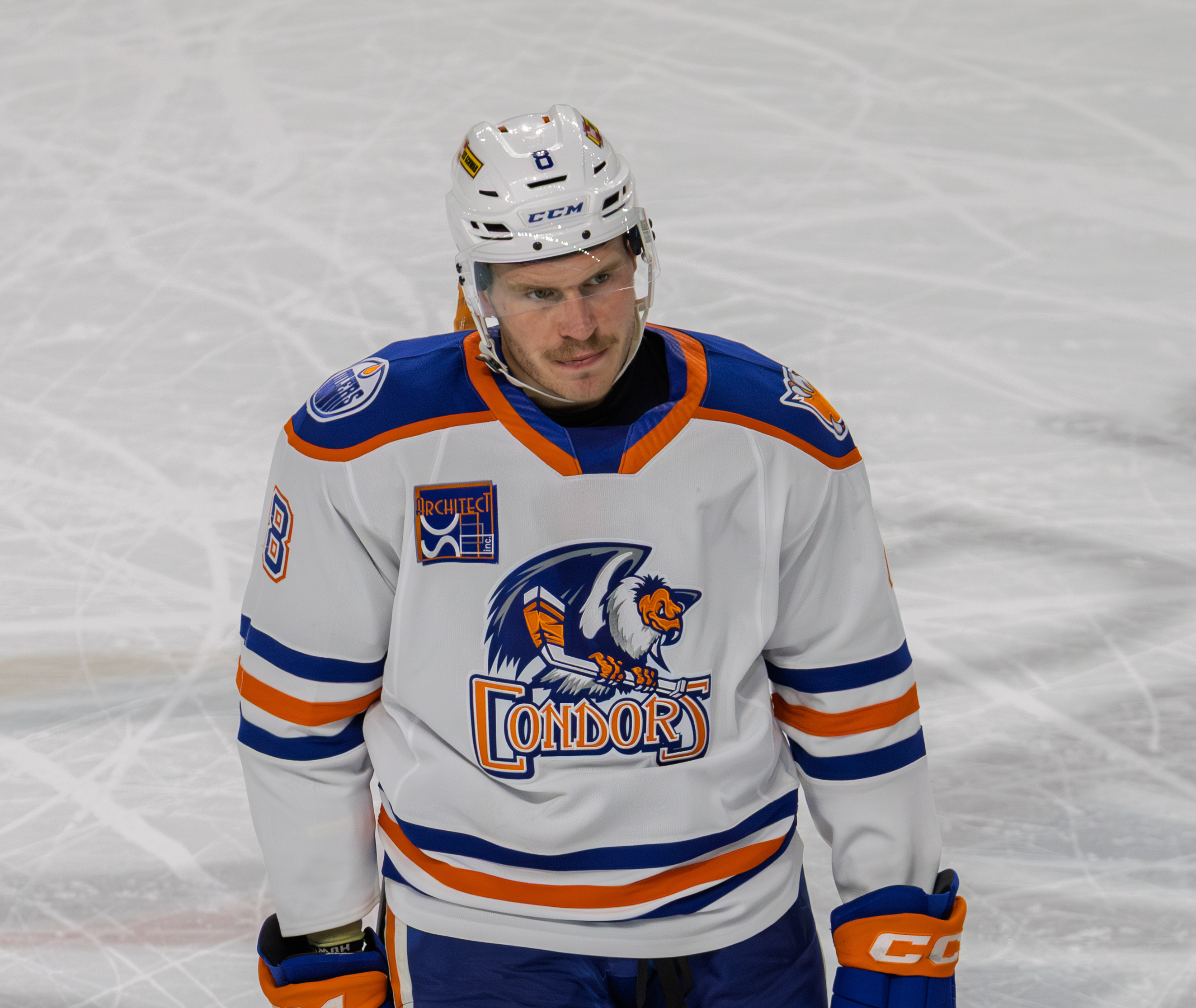
- Poulin with the Bakersfield Condors in 2026
- Born: February 25, 2001 (age 25) Blainville, Quebec, Canada
- Height: 6 ft 2 in (188 cm)
- Weight: 217 lb (98 kg; 15 st 7 lb)
- Position: Forward
- Shoots: Left
- NHL team (P) Cur. team Former teams: Montreal Canadiens; Laval Rocket (AHL); Pittsburgh Penguins
- NHL draft: 21st overall, 2019; Pittsburgh Penguins
- Playing career: 2021–present

Samuel Poulin (born February 25, 2001) is a Canadian professional ice hockey player who is a forward for the Laval Rocket of the American Hockey League (AHL) while under contract to the Montreal Canadiens of the National Hockey League (NHL). He was selected in the first round, 21st overall, by the Pittsburgh Penguins in the 2019 NHL entry draft.

== Playing career ==
=== Early years ===
As a youth, Poulin participated in both the 2013 and 2014 iterations of the Quebec International Pee-Wee Hockey Tournament with a minor ice hockey team from Boisbriand. He later played with the Collège Esther-Blondin Phénix of the Ligue de hockey Midget AAA du Québec (QMAAA) beginning in 2015–16, and was selected by the Sherbrooke Phoenix of the Quebec Major Junior Hockey League (QMJHL) in the 2017 QMJHL Draft.

Following the 2018–19 QMJHL season, Poulin was selected in the first round (21st overall) of the 2019 NHL entry draft by the Pittsburgh Penguins. He signed a three-year, entry-level contract with the team on September 22, 2019.

Serving as captain of the Phoenix during his final two QMJHL seasons from 2019 to 2021, Sherbrooke opted to trade Poulin to the Val-d'Or Foreurs in January 2021.

=== Professional ===
Poulin made his professional debut for the Wilkes-Barre/Scranton Penguins of the American Hockey League (AHL) in the 2021–22 AHL season. On October 23, 2022, he was recalled by Pittsburgh and made his NHL debut two days later, recording one assist in a 4–1 loss to the Calgary Flames. Thereafter, Poulin took a leave of absence from Wilkes-Barre/Scranton in December 2022 to address mental health concerns after suffering a panic attack during a game. He subsequently returned to the team in March 2023.

Early into the 2023–24 AHL season, Poulin suffered a high-ankle sprain on October 29, 2023, which kept him out of the Wilkes-Barre/Scranton lineup until mid December. After sustaining a separate lower-body injury on February 3, Poulin missed an additional month of playing time. Despite these setbacks, he was re-signed to a two-year contract extension by the Penguins organization on April 29, 2024.

On December 12, 2025, Pittsburgh traded Poulin, along with goaltender Tristan Jarry, to the Edmonton Oilers in exchange for goaltender Stuart Skinner, defenceman Brett Kulak and a 2029 second-round draft pick. He then joined the Bakersfield Condors, the Oilers' AHL affiliate, for the remainder of the 2025–26 AHL season.

Entering the offseason as an unrestricted free agent, Poulin agreed to a one-year, two way contract with the Montreal Canadiens on July 1, 2026.

== International play ==
Medal record

Representing Canada

Hlinka Gretzky Cup
Gold medal – first place	2018 Canada	

Internationally, Poulin represented the Canada national under-18 team at the 2018 Hlinka Gretzky Cup and 2019 World U18 Championships, capturing gold at the former.

== Personal life ==
Poulin's father, Patrick, was chosen ninth overall by the Hartford Whalers in the 1991 NHL entry draft. During his 11-year NHL career spanning from 1991 to 2002, he amassed 101 goals in 634 total games for the Whalers, Chicago Blackhawks, Tampa Bay Lightning, and Montreal Canadiens.

Poulin's godfather is former Penguins goaltender Jocelyn Thibault, who previously served as the general manager of the QMJHL's Sherbrooke Phoenix.

== Career statistics ==
=== Regular season and playoffs ===
			Regular season					Playoffs
Season	Team	League	GP	G	A	Pts	PIM	GP	G	A	Pts	PIM
2015–16	Collège Esther-Blondin Phénix	QMAAA	38	21	27	48	14	11	3	10	13	4
2016–17	Collège Esther-Blondin Phénix	QMAAA	39	30	38	68	50	5	0	5	5	6
2017–18	Sherbrooke Phoenix	QMJHL	55	16	29	45	42	11	5	1	6	6
2018–19	Sherbrooke Phoenix	QMJHL	67	29	47	76	46	10	8	6	14	4
2019–20	Sherbrooke Phoenix	QMJHL	46	32	45	77	47	—	—	—	—	—
2020–21	Sherbrooke Phoenix	QMJHL	5	3	3	6	4	—	—	—	—	—
2020–21	Val-d'Or Foreurs	QMJHL	19	8	17	25	10	15	11	8	19	12
2021–22	Wilkes-Barre/Scranton Penguins	AHL	72	16	21	37	51	6	3	1	4	6
2022–23	Wilkes-Barre/Scranton Penguins	AHL	15	4	0	4	6	—	—	—	—	—
2022–23	Pittsburgh Penguins	NHL	3	0	1	1	2	—	—	—	—	—
2023–24	Wilkes-Barre/Scranton Penguins	AHL	41	16	15	31	35	2	0	1	1	0
2023–24	Pittsburgh Penguins	NHL	3	0	0	0	2	—	—	—	—	—
2024–25	Wilkes-Barre/Scranton Penguins	AHL	57	19	24	43	34	2	0	1	1	2
2024–25	Pittsburgh Penguins	NHL	7	0	1	1	2	—	—	—	—	—
2025–26	Wilkes-Barre/Scranton Penguins	AHL	22	9	11	20	18	—	—	—	—	—
2025–26	Pittsburgh Penguins	NHL	2	0	0	0	0	—	—	—	—	—
2025–26	Bakersfield Condors	AHL	49	12	17	29	37	3	1	3	4	4
NHL totals			15	0	2	2	6	—	—	—	—	—

=== International ===
Year	Team	Event	Result	GP	G	A	Pts	PIM
2017	Canada White	U17	4th	6	0	3	3	0
2018	Canada	HG18	1st place, gold medalist(s)	5	0	1	1	0
2019	Canada	U18	4th	7	1	1	2	2
Junior totals				18	1	5	6	2

== Awards and honours ==
Award	Year	Ref
QMAAA
First All-Star Team	2017	
CHL
CHL Canada/Russia Series	2018, 2019	
CHL/NHL Top Prospects Game	2019	

Awards and achievements
Preceded by Kasperi Kapanen	Pittsburgh Penguins first-round draft pick 2019	Succeeded by Owen Pickering
