= Tristan Jarry =

Canadian ice hockey player (born 1995)

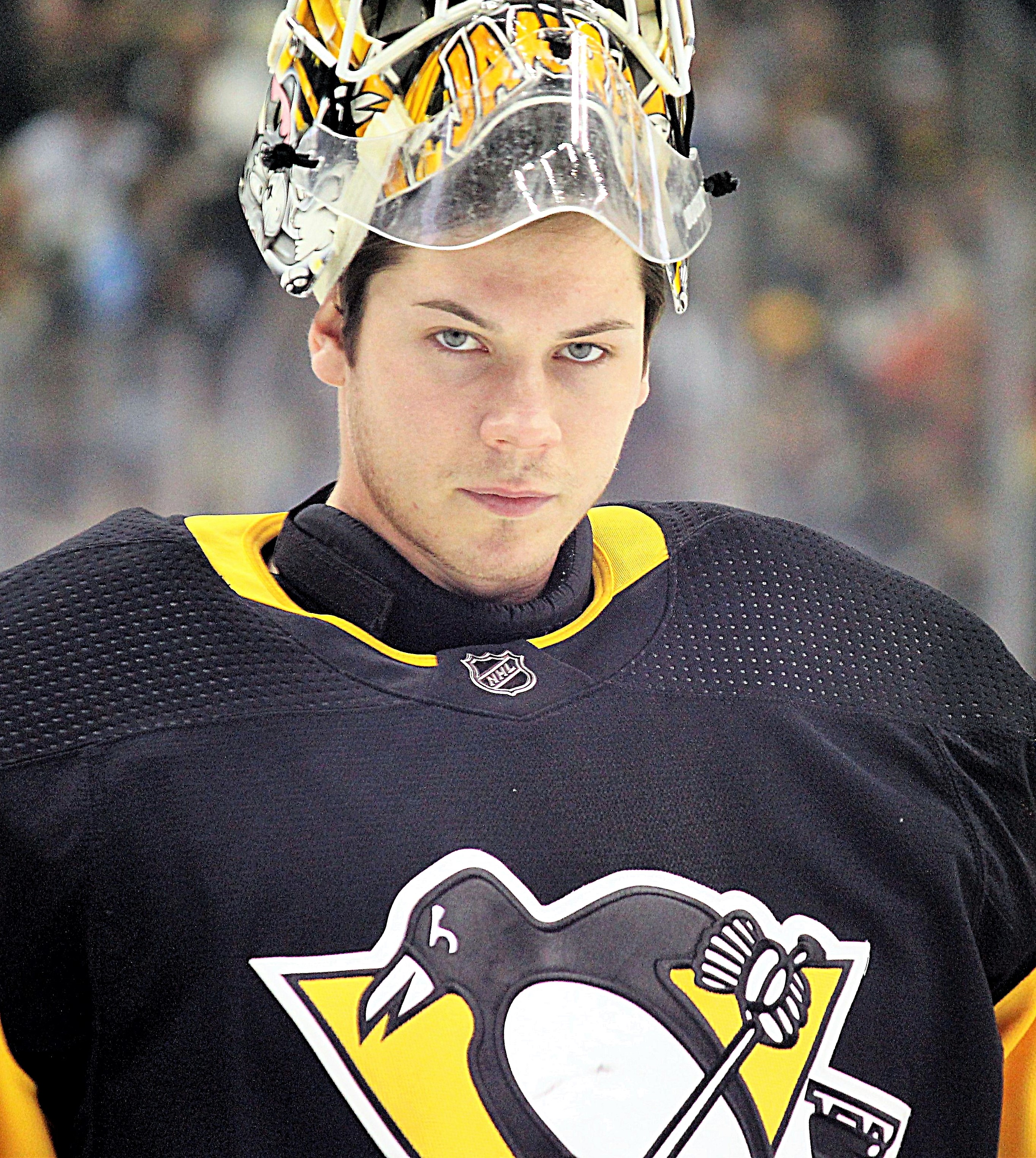
- Jarry with the Pittsburgh Penguins in 2017
- Born: April 29, 1995 (age 31) Surrey, British Columbia, Canada
- Height: 6 ft 1 in (185 cm)
- Weight: 201 lb (91 kg; 14 st 5 lb)
- Position: Goaltender
- Catches: Left
- NHL team Former teams: Edmonton Oilers; Pittsburgh Penguins
- NHL draft: 44th overall, 2013; Pittsburgh Penguins
- Playing career: 2015–present

Tristan Raymond Jarry (born April 29, 1995) is a Canadian professional ice hockey player who is a goaltender for the Edmonton Oilers of the National Hockey League (NHL). Jarry was selected by the Pittsburgh Penguins in the second round (44th overall) of the 2013 NHL entry draft, and played for the organization for parts of 10 seasons before being traded to the Oilers during the 2025–26 season.

== Playing career ==
Jarry started with the Edmonton Oil Kings during the 2011–12 season, playing 14 games with a 0.894 save percentage. In his second season with Edmonton, Jarry played 27 games, and led all goaltenders with a 0.936 save percentage and 1.61 goals against average. In the 2013 CHL Top Prospects Game, Jarry stopped all 16 shots at him to be named Team Cherry's Player of the Game, and the following season he was named to the 2013–14 season WHL Eastern Conference First All-Star Team. In 2014, Jarry helped lead the Oil Kings in winning the 2014 Memorial Cup, making 32 saves in a 6–3 victory over the Guelph Storm in the championship game.

=== Pittsburgh Penguins ===
On April 7, 2015, Jarry was assigned to the AHL's Wilkes-Barre/Scranton Penguins. On April 9, 2016, Jarry was called up by Pittsburgh Penguins wearing No. 35 when goaltenders Marc-André Fleury and Matt Murray were both injured. He dressed for the first two games of the playoffs for Pittsburgh, then was sent back to the minors when Murray returned from injuries. On May 19, he was recalled for the rest of the season as an emergency goaltender. Jarry did not qualify to be on the Cup, since he did not play for the Penguins in the 2015–16 regular season or dress in the Stanley Cup Finals. He was given a Stanley Cup ring for dressing in the playoffs.

Jarry played his first NHL preseason game on September 28, 2016, where he posted a 30-save shutout in a 2–0 victory over the Chicago Blackhawks. Despite an early-season injury to starting goaltender Matt Murray, the Penguins returned Jarry to Wilkes-Barre for the start of the AHL season and instead signed Mike Condon as backup. With Jarry as the starting goaltender for the Baby Penguins he posted career numbers in 45 games with 28 wins and a 2.15 goals against average, being named to the 2017 all-star game receiving the Harry "Hap" Holmes Memorial Award, and helping Wilkes-Barre finish with the best record in the regular season. Jarry was called up to the NHL on April 9, and the next day, he made his NHL debut, starting for the Penguins in a 3–2 loss to the New York Rangers on the final game of the regular season, in a game in which Magnus Hellberg also made his first NHL start. Due to an injury to Murray, Jarry remained on the NHL roster as a backup to veteran Marc-André Fleury. Jarry dressed for 11 playoff games, until Murray return from injury. The Penguins repeated as Stanley Cup Champions. Jarry received 2nd Stanley Cup ring from the Penguins organization, despite only playing in one NHL game. Jarry did not dress in the finals, so he could not get his name on the cup.

Jarry won his first NHL game, and got his first NHL assist, on November 25, 2017, in a 5–2 win against the Tampa Bay Lightning. He then recorded his first NHL shutout six days later on December 1, 2017, in a 4–0 win against the Buffalo Sabres. On January 24, 2018, he was reassigned to the Wilkes-Barre/Scranton Penguins, when Matt Murray returned after missing the first half of the season due to the death of his father. He was recalled on February 4, 2018, replacing Casey DeSmith as backup. On February 26, Pittsburgh recalled DeSmith, once again switching with Jarry for the backup goaltender position. However, Jarry was recalled the very next day after Murray suffered a concussion the day prior. On July 26, 2018, the Penguins re-signed Jarry to a two-year, $1.35 million contract extension worth $650,000 annually. The extension is a two-way deal in 2018–19, and a one-way deal in 2019–20 season.

Jarry attended the Penguins' training and development camp prior to the 2018–19 season. He was injured in the Penguins' last preseason game against the Columbus Blue Jackets on September 28 and was placed on the Penguins' injured non-roster prior to the beginning of the 2018–19 season. He was eventually assigned to the Wilkes-Barre/Scranton Penguins on October 5. Jarry recorded the first goal scored by a goaltender in Wilkes-Barre/Scranton Penguins history during a 5–1 win over the Springfield Thunderbirds on November 14, 2018. He was recalled to the NHL on November 22 after starter Matt Murray was placed on injured reserve.

On October 3, 2020, Jarry signed a three-year, $10.5 million contract extension with the Penguins. He became the primary goaltender for the Penguins after Matt Murray was traded to the Ottawa Senators. In January 2020, Jarry appeared in his first NHL Allstar Game, replacing injured Columbus Blue Jacket's goaltender Joonas Korpisalo. Finishing the regular season with a .909 save percentage, Jarry helped the Penguins clinch first place in the NHL East Division during the 2020–21 season.

On May 24, 2021, Jarry turned over the puck in his zone and allowed Josh Bailey to score the Game 5 double overtime winner for the New York Islanders, who thus took a 3–2 series lead in the first round of the 2021 Stanley Cup playoffs. The Penguins were then eliminated in Game 6 after losing 5–3 to the Islanders; Jarry posted a .888 save percentage in the postseason.

During the 2021–22 season, Jarry again appeared in the annual NHL All-Star Game. He finished the regular season with a .919 save percentage and ranked eighth amongst goaltenders in wins. However, on April 14, 2022, Jarry sustained a foot injury in a game against the New York Islanders, two weeks before the start of the 2022 Stanley Cup playoffs. As a result of his injury, Jarry missed the first 6 playoff games of a 7 game series against the New York Rangers. Playing with a still injured foot, Jarry returned for Game 7, where the Rangers ultimately eliminated the Penguins in a 4-3 OT loss.

In the 2022–23 season, injuries continued to plague Jarry, where he played only 47 games out of the 82 game season. Notably, during the 2023 NHL Winter Classic game against the Boston Bruins, Jarry sustained a lower-body injury, forcing him to leave the game with 4:30 minutes left in the first period. Jarry finished the regular season with a .909 save percentage.

On July 1, 2023, Jarry re-signed to the Penguins on a five-year, $26.9 million contract extension.

On November 30, 2023, Jarry scored his second career goal, and first in the NHL, in a 4–2 victory over the Tampa Bay Lightning, becoming the first Penguins goaltender and 14th NHL goaltender overall to do so.

=== Edmonton Oilers ===
On December 12, 2025, Pittsburgh traded Jarry and forward Samuel Poulin to the Edmonton Oilers in exchange for goaltender Stuart Skinner, defenceman Brett Kulak, and a 2029 second-round draft pick. Jarry inherited the starting goaltender role from the departing Skinner; however, he struggled with consistency, recording a save percentage of .855 in his first 15 starts with the Oilers. Consequently, he slipped down into a backup goaltender role to Connor Ingram for the remainder of the 2025–26 season.

== Goaltender mask design ==
Jarry has had the Penguins of Madagascar playing pond hockey against Tom and Jerry displayed on his goaltender mask, referencing the Pittsburgh Penguins and paying homage to his last name. Tom and Jerry was a nickname given to Jarry by previous Oil Kings teammate Kristiāns Pelšs who died in 2013.

== Personal life ==
Jarry is married to Hannah Hatcher, the daughter of former Penguins player Kevin Hatcher.

== Career statistics ==
			Regular season									Playoffs
Season	Team	League	GP	W	L	T/OT	MIN	GA	SO	GAA	SV%	GP	W	L	MIN	GA	SO	GAA	SV%
2011–12	Edmonton Oil Kings	WHL	14	8	2	1	718	35	0	2.93	.894	—	—	—	—	—	—	—	—
2012–13	Edmonton Oil Kings	WHL	27	18	7	0	1,495	40	6	1.61	.936	1	0	0	27	0	0	0.00	1.000
2013–14	Edmonton Oil Kings	WHL	63	44	14	3	3,703	138	8	2.24	.914	21	16	5	1,261	46	3	2.19	.925
2014–15	Edmonton Oil Kings	WHL	55	23	26	6	3,216	147	3	2.74	.907	5	1	4	312	15	0	2.88	.896
2015–16	Wilkes-Barre/Scranton Penguins	AHL	33	17	13	3	1,943	87	5	2.69	.905	3	1	0	107	4	0	2.24	.902
2016–17	Wilkes-Barre/Scranton Penguins	AHL	45	28	15	2	2,707	97	3	2.15	.925	—	—	—	—	—	—	—	—
2016–17	Pittsburgh Penguins	NHL	1	0	1	0	59	3	0	3.06	.880	—	—	—	—	—	—	—	—
2017–18	Wilkes-Barre/Scranton Penguins	AHL	16	9	5	2	963	49	0	3.05	.901	3	0	3	181	10	0	3.31	.894
2017–18	Pittsburgh Penguins	NHL	26	14	6	2	1,364	63	2	2.77	.908	—	—	—	—	—	—	—	—
2018–19	Wilkes-Barre/Scranton Penguins	AHL	47	23	15	8	2,792	124	1	2.66	.915	—	—	—	—	—	—	—	—
2018–19	Pittsburgh Penguins	NHL	2	0	1	1	121	7	0	3.50	.887	—	—	—	—	—	—	—	—
2019–20	Pittsburgh Penguins	NHL	33	20	12	1	1,927	78	3	2.43	.921	1	0	1	59	1	0	1.02	.952
2020–21	Pittsburgh Penguins	NHL	39	25	9	3	2,185	100	2	2.75	.909	6	2	4	396	21	0	3.18	.888
2021–22	Pittsburgh Penguins	NHL	58	34	18	6	3,416	138	4	2.42	.919	1	0	1	65	4	0	3.71	.867
2022–23	Pittsburgh Penguins	NHL	47	24	13	7	2,651	128	2	2.90	.909	—	—	—	—	—	—	—	—
2023–24	Pittsburgh Penguins	NHL	51	19	25	5	2,741	133	6	2.91	.903	—	—	—	—	—	—	—	—
2024–25	Pittsburgh Penguins	NHL	36	16	12	6	2,020	104	2	3.12	.893	—	—	—	—	—	—	—	—
2024–25	Wilkes-Barre/Scranton Penguins	AHL	12	6	5	1	718	32	1	2.67	.908	—	—	—	—	—	—	—	—
2025–26	Pittsburgh Penguins	NHL	14	9	3	1	811	36	1	2.66	.909	—	—	—	—	—	—	—	—
2025–26	Edmonton Oilers	NHL	19	9	6	2	963	62	1	3.86	.858	1	0	1	62	4	0	3.84	.895
NHL totals			326	170	106	34	18,884	853	23	2.80	.907	9	2	7	582	30	0	3.09	.891

== Awards and honours ==
Award	Year	Ref
WHL
CHL Top Prospects Game Player of the Game	2013	
First All-Star Team (East)	2013–14	
Memorial Cup champion	2014	
AHL
Harry "Hap" Holmes Memorial Award	2016–17 (Note: Shared with Casey DeSmith)	
NHL
All-Star Game	2020, 2022	
