= 2023 IIHF World Championship Group B =

International ice hockey results

Group B was one of two groups of the 2023 IIHF World Championship. The four best-placed teams advanced to the playoff round, while Slovenia, who placed last in the group, was relegated to Division I in 2024.

== Standings ==
Pos	Team	Pld	W	OTW	OTL	L	GF	GA	GD	Pts	Qualification or relegation
1	Switzerland	7	6	0	1	0	29	10	+19	19	Quarterfinals
2	Canada	7	4	1	1	1	25	11	+14	15	Quarterfinals
3	Latvia (H)	7	3	2	0	2	21	17	+4	13 (Note: Czechia 3–4 (OT) Latvia)	Quarterfinals
4	Czechia	7	4	0	1	2	22	16	+6	13	Quarterfinals
5	Slovakia	7	3	0	2	2	15	15	0	11	Qualification for 2024 IIHF World Championship
6	Kazakhstan	7	1	2	0	4	14	31	−17	7	Qualification for 2024 IIHF World Championship
7	Norway	7	1	1	1	4	9	17	−8	6	Qualification for 2024 IIHF World Championship
8	Slovenia	7	0	0	0	7	9	27	−18	0	Relegation to 2024 Division I A

Source: IIHF
Rules for classification: 1) points; 2) head-to-head points; 3) head-to-head goal difference; 4) head-to-head number of goals scored; 5) result against closest best-ranked team outside tied teams; 6) result against second-best-ranked team outside tied teams; 7) seeding before tournament
(H) Host

== Matches ==
All times are local (UTC+3).

=== Slovakia vs Czechia ===
12 May 2023; 16:20	Slovakia	2–3 (2–3, 0–0, 0–0)	Czechia	Arena Riga, Riga; Attendance: 7,800

Game reference

Stanislav Škorvánek
Goalies
Šimon Hrubec
Referees:
(United States) Sean Fernandez
(Germany) André Schrader
Linesmen:
(United States) Nick Briganti
(Denmark) Andreas Krøyer

Chromiak (Kňažko, Cehlárik) (PP) – 04:52	1–0
	1–1	06:38 – Červenka (Kubalík, Chytil)
Rosandić (Lantoši, Čacho) – 10:57	2–1
	2–2	13:48 – Sedlák (Flek, Kundrátek) (SH)
	2–3	18:48 – Sedlák (Kubalík, Tomášek) (PP)

27 min
Penalties
6 min
26
Shots
22

=== Latvia vs Canada ===
12 May 2023; 20:20	Latvia	0–6 (0–2, 0–2, 0–2)	Canada	Arena Riga, Riga; Attendance: 9,260

Game reference

Ivars Punnenovs
Artūrs Šilovs
Goalies
Sam Montembeault
Referees:
(Finland) Lassi Heikkinen
(Czech Republic) Jan Hribik
Linesmen:
(Germany) Andreas Hofer
(Sweden) Emil Yletyinen

0–1	00:52 – Crouse (Glass, Krebs)
0–2	04:56 – Laughton (Weegar, Middleton)
0–3	28:17 – Weegar (Quinn, Toffoli) (PP)
0–4	35:12 – Blais (Veleno, Hunt)
0–5	53:58 – Veleno (Weegar)
0–6	55:40 – McBain (Carcone, Fantilli)

8 min
Penalties
4 min
23
Shots
29

=== Switzerland vs Slovenia ===
13 May 2023; 12:20	Switzerland	7–0 (2–0, 1–0, 4–0)	Slovenia	Arena Riga, Riga; Attendance: 3,260

Game reference

Leonardo Genoni
Goalies
Gašper Krošelj
Referees:
(Finland) Lassi Heikkinen
(Canada) Mike Langin
Linesmen:
(Czech Republic) Daniel Hynek
(Austria) David Nothegger

Malgin (Kukan, Haas) (PP) – 12:56	1–0
Moser (Corvi, Herzog) – 13:29	2–0
Niederreiter (Malgin, Haas) (PP) – 32:47	3–0
Malgin (Simion, Haas) (PP) – 41:59	4–0
Thürkauf (Loeffel) (PP) – 43:46	5–0
Miranda (Richard, Bertschy) – 50:39	6–0
Bertschy (Thürkauf) – 57:05	7–0

4 min
Penalties
12 min
36
Shots
17

=== Norway vs Kazakhstan ===
13 May 2023; 16:20	Norway	3–4 GWS (2–1, 1–1, 0–1) (OT: 0–0) (SO: 0–1)	Kazakhstan	Arena Riga, Riga; Attendance: 2,870

Game reference

Henrik Haukeland
Goalies
Andrei Shutov
Referees:
(United States) Sean Fernandez
(Switzerland) Stefan Hürlimann
Linesmen:
(France) Nicolas Constantineau
(Finland) Tommi Niittylä

Haga (Nørstebø, Trettenes) (PP) – 07:48	1–0
Holm (Trettenes, Martinsen) – 09:06	2–0
	2–1	15:29 – Mukhametov (Muratov, Beketayev)
Haga (Granath, Nørstebø) (PP) – 21:44	3–1
	3–2	35:11 – Orekhov (Savitski, Muratov) (PP)
	3–3	51:27 – Mikhailis (Rymarev, Starchenko) (PP)

Haga (miss)
Trettenes (miss)
Hansen (miss)
Olden
Olsen (miss)
Olden (miss)
Shootout
(miss) Grents
(miss) Muratov
Starchenko
(miss) Mikhailis
(miss) Rymarev
Starchenko
6 min
Penalties
8 min
34
Shots
18

=== Slovakia vs Latvia ===
13 May 2023; 20:20	Slovakia	2–1 (1–0, 0–1, 1–0)	Latvia	Arena Riga, Riga; Attendance: 8,930

Game reference

Stanislav Škorvánek
Goalies
Artūrs Šilovs
Referees:
(Sweden) Christoffer Holm
(United Kingdom) Liam Sewell
Linesmen:
(United States) Nick Briganti
(Denmark) Andreas Krøyer

Sukeľ (Cehlárik) – 00:44	1–0
	1–1	36:51 – Ābols
Hrivík (Koch, Pánik) – 50:04	2–1

10 min
Penalties
2 min
29
Shots
28

=== Slovenia vs Canada ===
14 May 2023; 12:20	Slovenia	2–5 (1–0, 0–3, 1–2)	Canada	Arena Riga, Riga; Attendance: 3,380

Game reference

Luka Gračnar
Goalies
Devon Levi
Referees:
(Switzerland) Stefan Hürlimann
(Germany) André Schrader
Linesmen:
(France) Nicolas Constantineau
(Sweden) Emil Yletyinen

Drozg (Jeglič, Verlič) (PP) – 03:50	1–0
	1–1	21:13 – Carcone (Weegar, McBain)
	1–2	27:31 – Joseph (Toffoli)
	1–3	38:46 – Lucic (Glass, Weegar) (PP)
	1–4	53:59 – Weegar (Toffoli, Middleton)
	1–5	54:50 – McBain (Carcone, Neighbours)
Drozg (Ograjenšek, Gregorc) – 55:10	2–5

10 min
Penalties
12 min
24
Shots
51

=== Norway vs Switzerland ===
14 May 2023; 16:20	Norway	0–3 (0–2, 0–0, 0–1)	Switzerland	Arena Riga, Riga; Attendance: 3,232

Game reference

Jonas Arntzen
Goalies
Robert Mayer
Referees:
(Czech Republic) Jan Hribik
(United Kingdom) Liam Sewell
Linesmen:
(United States) Nick Briganti
(Czech Republic) Daniel Hynek

0–1	08:13 – Simion (Miranda, Glauser)
0–2	19:28 – Glauser (Miranda, Simion)
0–3	57:46 – Niederreiter (Bertschy, Richard) (EN)

10 min
Penalties
14 min
14
Shots
26

=== Czechia vs Kazakhstan ===
14 May 2023; 20:20	Czechia	5–1 (2–0, 0–1, 3–0)	Kazakhstan	Arena Riga, Riga; Attendance: 3,670

Game reference

Marek Langhamer
Goalies
Andrey Shutov
Referees:
(Sweden) Christoffer Holm
(Canada) Mike Langin
Linesmen:
(Germany) Andreas Hofer
(Finland) Tommi Niittylä

Zbořil (Sobotka, Sedlák) – 08:48	1–0
Kubalík (Kempný, Sedlák) (PP) – 15:25	2–0
	2–1	31:18 – Mukhametov (Muratov, Kaiyrzhan)
Sedlák (Tomášek) – 41:06	3–1
Košťálek (Červenka, Špaček) (PP) – 45:46	4–1
Kubalík (Špaček, Košťálek) (PP2) – 58:59	5–1

2 min
Penalties
14 min
43
Shots
15

=== Slovakia vs Canada ===
15 May 2023; 16:20	Slovakia	1–2 GWS (1–1, 0–0, 0–0) (OT: 0–0) (SO: 0–1)	Canada	Arena Riga, Riga; Attendance: 4,640

Game reference
Samuel Hlavaj	Goalies	Sam Montembeault	Referees: (Czech Republic) Jan Hribik (Germany) André Schrader; Linesmen: (Denmark) Andreas Krøyer (Finland) Tommi Niittylä
/ 0–1 / 07:46 – Neighbours (McBain); Cehlárik (Hrivík, Hudáček) (PP) – 16:08 / 1–1			Referees: (Czech Republic) Jan Hribik (Germany) André Schrader; Linesmen: (Denmark) Andreas Krøyer (Finland) Tommi Niittylä
Pánik; Hrivík (miss); Sukeľ (miss); Cehlárik (miss); Chromiak; Pánik (miss); Nemec (miss); Chromiak (miss)	Shootout	(miss) Quinn; (miss) Fantilli; Glass; (miss) Toffoli; Carcone; (miss) Glass; (miss) Carcone; Quinn	Referees: (Czech Republic) Jan Hribik (Germany) André Schrader; Linesmen: (Denmark) Andreas Krøyer (Finland) Tommi Niittylä
41 min	Penalties	18 min	Referees: (Czech Republic) Jan Hribik (Germany) André Schrader; Linesmen: (Denmark) Andreas Krøyer (Finland) Tommi Niittylä
24	Shots	44	Referees: (Czech Republic) Jan Hribik (Germany) André Schrader; Linesmen: (Denmark) Andreas Krøyer (Finland) Tommi Niittylä

=== Czechia vs Latvia ===
15 May 2023; 20:20	Czechia	3–4 OT (1–0, 1–2, 1–1) (OT: 0–1)	Latvia	Arena Riga, Riga; Attendance: 7,780

Game reference

Šimon Hrubec
Goalies
Artūrs Šilovs
Referees:
(Finland) Lassi Heikkinen
(Switzerland) Stefan Hürlimann
Linesmen:
(Austria) David Nothegger
(Sweden) Emil Yletyinen

Němeček (Beránek, Černoch) – 08:25	1–0
	1–1	22:16 – Ri. Bukarts (Cibuļskis, Džeriņš)
	1–2	23:18 – Dzierkals (Freibergs, Balcers)
Kubalík (Červenka, Dvořák) – 29:21	2–2
	2–3	45:22 – Cibuļskis (Andersons, Smirnovs)
Kempný (Červenka, Kubalík) – 56:58	3–3
	3–4	64:16 – Batna (Jaks, Dzierkals)

6 min
Penalties
8 min
25
Shots
35

=== Slovenia vs Norway ===
16 May 2023; 16:20	Slovenia	0–1 (0–1, 0–0, 0–0)	Norway	Arena Riga, Riga; Attendance: 2,167

Game reference
Gašper Krošelj	Goalies	Henrik Haukeland	Referees: (Canada) Adam Bloski (Sweden) Christoffer Holm; Linesmen: (France) Nicolas Constantineau (Czech Republic) Daniel Hynek
0–1 / 14:05 – Berg-Paulsen (Johannesen, Olsen)			Referees: (Canada) Adam Bloski (Sweden) Christoffer Holm; Linesmen: (France) Nicolas Constantineau (Czech Republic) Daniel Hynek
6 min	Penalties	8 min	Referees: (Canada) Adam Bloski (Sweden) Christoffer Holm; Linesmen: (France) Nicolas Constantineau (Czech Republic) Daniel Hynek
18	Shots	29	Referees: (Canada) Adam Bloski (Sweden) Christoffer Holm; Linesmen: (France) Nicolas Constantineau (Czech Republic) Daniel Hynek

=== Switzerland vs Kazakhstan ===
16 May 2023; 20:20	Switzerland	5–0 (1–0, 2–0, 2–0)	Kazakhstan	Arena Riga, Riga; Attendance: 2,792

Game reference

Leonardo Genoni
Goalies
Andrei Shutov
Nikita Boyarkin
Referees:
(United States) Sean MacFarlane
(United Kingdom) Liam Sewell
Linesmen:
(United States) Jake Davis
(Canada) Tarrington Wyonzek

Geisser (Haas, Miranda) – 04:48	1–0
Herzog (Fora, Riat) – 27:34	2–0
Riat (Richard, Herzog) – 30:59	3–0
Niederreiter (Malgin, Kukan) (PP) – 40:44	4–0
Loeffel (Senteler) – 49:31	5–0

0 min
Penalties
6 min
36
Shots
13

=== Latvia vs Norway ===
17 May 2023; 16:20	Latvia	2–1 (0–0, 2–1, 0–0)	Norway	Arena Riga, Riga; Attendance: 6,872

Game reference

Artūrs Šilovs
Goalies
Henrik Haukeland
Referees:
(Canada) Adam Bloski
(Germany) André Schrader
Linesmen:
(United States) Jake Davis
(Finland) Tommi Niittylä

Ābols (Balcers, Daugaviņš) (PP) – 23:14	1–0
Andersons (Ķēniņš) – 23:53	2–0
	2–1	34:20 – Hoff (Salsten)

14 min
Penalties
16 min
32
Shots
21

=== Canada vs Kazakhstan ===
17 May 2023; 20:20	Canada	5–1 (4–1, 0–0, 1–0)	Kazakhstan	Arena Riga, Riga; Attendance: 3,411

Game reference

Joel Hofer
Goalies
Nikita Boyarkin
Referees:
(Finland) Lassi Heikkinen
(Switzerland) Stefan Hürlimann
Linesmen:
(Czech Republic) Daniel Hynek
(Austria) David Nothegger

Weegar (Blais, Veleno) – 00:19	1–0
Crouse (Weegar, Quinn) – 05:05	2–0
Crouse (Laughton, Barron) – 07:50	3–0
	3–1	09:55 – Beketayev (Daniyar, Rymarev)
Veleno (Blais) – 19:22	4–1
Blais (Veleno, Lucic) – 41:55	5–1

2 min
Penalties
0 min
40
Shots
17

=== Czechia vs Slovenia ===
18 May 2023; 16:20	Czechia	6–2 (0–2, 1–0, 5–0)	Slovenia	Arena Riga, Riga; Attendance: 3,670

Game reference

Karel Vejmelka
Goalies
Luka Gračnar
Referees:
(Denmark) Mads Frandsen
(Switzerland) Miroslav Stolc
Linesmen:
(Switzerland) Eric Cattaneo
(Denmark) Andreas Krøyer

	0–1	07:23 – Verlič (Urbas, Gregorc)
	0–2	11:49 – Urbas (Gregorc, Jeglič) (PP)
Kubalík (Kempný, Tomášek) (PP) – 38:19	1–2
Kubalík (Tomášek, Smejkal) (PP) – 43:37	2–2
Červenka (Voženílek, Košťálek) – 45:00	3–2
Kempný (Sobotka, Kubalík) – 51:12	4–2
Kubalík (Zbořil, Červenka) (EN) – 57:49	5–2
Flek (Kempný, Dvořák) – 58:56	6–2

6 min
Penalties
6 min
41
Shots
20

=== Switzerland vs Slovakia ===
18 May 2023; 20:20	Switzerland	4–2 (1–0, 1–2, 2–0)	Slovakia	Arena Riga, Riga; Attendance: 4,840

Game reference

Robert Mayer
Goalies
Samuel Hlavaj
Referees:
(Sweden) Christoffer Holm
(United States) Sean MacFarlane
Linesmen:
(Austria) David Nothegger
(Czech Republic) Jiří Ondráček

Siegenthaler (Malgin, Hischier) – 05:07	1–0
Niederreiter (Ambühl) – 24:47	2–0
	2–1	25:08 – Kudrna (Kelemen, Ivan)
	2–2	39:29 – Regenda (Okuliar, Kňažko) (PP)
Marti (Richard) – 46:51	3–2
Haas (Miranda, Simion) (EN) – 59:25	4–2

4 min
Penalties
6 min
36
Shots
13

=== Latvia vs Slovenia ===
19 May 2023; 16:20	Latvia	3–2 (1–0, 2–2, 0–0)	Slovenia	Arena Riga, Riga; Attendance: 9,180

Game reference

Artūrs Šilovs
Goalies
Gašper Krošelj
Referees:
(Germany) André Schrader
(Switzerland) Miroslav Stolc
Linesmen:
(Switzerland) Eric Cattaneo
(Czech Republic) Daniel Hynek

Ri. Bukarts (Džeriņš, Indrašis) – 11:14	1–0
	1–1	27:55 – Kuralt (Tičar, Magovac)
Daugaviņš (Balinskis) (PP) – 31:20	2–1
Ro. Bukarts (Džeriņš) – 37:39	3–1
	3–2	39:47 – Verlič (Urbas)

6 min
Penalties
8 min
27
Shots
28

=== Kazakhstan vs Slovakia ===
19 May 2023; 20:20	Kazakhstan	4–3 GWS (0–1, 3–0, 0–2) (OT: 0–0) (SO: 1–0)	Slovakia	Arena Riga, Riga; Attendance: 3,670

Game reference

Andrei Shutov
Goalies
Samuel Hlavaj
Referees:
(Canada) Adam Bloski
(Switzerland) Stefan Hürlimann
Linesmen:
(United States) Jake Davis
(Canada) Tarrington Wyonzek

	0–1	14:58 – Koch (Hrivík)
Starchenko (Rymarev, Daniyar) – 21:03	1–1
Orekhov (Mikhailis, Starchenko) – 24:50	2–1
Rymarev (Mikhailis, Starchenko) (PP) – 25:22	3–1
	3–2	48:33 – Pánik (Hrivík, Koch)
	3–3	56:58 – Regenda (Hrivík, Ivan)

Savitski
Rymarev
Muratov
Mikhailis
Shootout
Hudáček
(miss) Hrivík
(miss) Lantoši
8 min
Penalties
8 min
26
Shots
51

=== Norway vs Czechia ===
20 May 2023; 12:20	Norway	0–2 (0–2, 0–0, 0–0)	Czechia	Arena Riga, Riga; Attendance: 5,348

Game reference
Henrik Haukeland	Goalies	Karel Vejmelka	Referees: (Germany) André Schrader (Switzerland) Miroslav Stolc; Linesmen: (Switzerland) Eric Cattaneo (Denmark) Andreas Krøyer
0–1 / 12:33 – Kubalík (Košťálek, Červenka) (PP2); 0–2 / 18:43 – Flek (Kempný, Vejmelka)			Referees: (Germany) André Schrader (Switzerland) Miroslav Stolc; Linesmen: (Switzerland) Eric Cattaneo (Denmark) Andreas Krøyer
12 min	Penalties	31 min	Referees: (Germany) André Schrader (Switzerland) Miroslav Stolc; Linesmen: (Switzerland) Eric Cattaneo (Denmark) Andreas Krøyer
27	Shots	21	Referees: (Germany) André Schrader (Switzerland) Miroslav Stolc; Linesmen: (Switzerland) Eric Cattaneo (Denmark) Andreas Krøyer

=== Canada vs Switzerland ===
20 May 2023; 16:20	Canada	2–3 (0–0, 1–2, 1–1)	Switzerland	Arena Riga, Riga; Attendance: 8,234

Game reference

Sam Montembeault
Goalies
Leonardo Genoni
Referees:
(Sweden) Tobias Björk
(Denmark) Mads Frandsen
Linesmen:
(Finland) Onni Hautamäki
(Czech Republic) Jiří Ondráček

Toffoli (Laughton, Quinn) (PP) – 29:58	1–0
	1–1	33:24 – Hischier (Fora, Fiala)
	1–2	37:00 – Simion (Marti, Haas)
	1–3	52:08 – Ambühl (Niederreiter, Corvi)
Carcone (Hunt, Neighbours) – 56:22	2–3

6 min
Penalties
4 min
29
Shots
26

=== Kazakhstan vs Latvia ===
20 May 2023; 20:20	Kazakhstan	0–7 (0–2, 0–3, 0–2)	Latvia	Arena Riga, Riga; Attendance: 9,200

Game reference

Andrei Shutov
Nikita Boyarkin
Goalies
Artūrs Šilovs
Referees:
(Switzerland) Stefan Hürlimann
(United States) Sean MacFarlane
Linesmen:
(Czech Republic) Daniel Hynek
(Slovakia) Šimon Synek

0–1	15:39 – Ri. Bukarts (Dzierkals, Šilovs) (PP)
0–2	17:19 – Batņa (Zīle)
0–3	21:13 – Dzierkals (Batņa, Ro. Bukarts)
0–4	29:05 – Ābols (Daugaviņš, Balcers)
0–5	39:54 – Indrašis (Ri. Bukarts, Freibergs)
0–6	49:50 – Daugaviņš (Balcers, Ābols)
0–7	51:40 – Ābols (Balcers, Daugaviņš) (PP)

10 min
Penalties
6 min
16
Shots
34

=== Slovenia vs Slovakia ===
21 May 2023; 16:20	Slovenia	0–1 (0–0, 0–1, 0–0)	Slovakia	Arena Riga, Riga; Attendance: 4,460

Game reference
Luka Gračnar	Goalies	Stanislav Škorvánek	Referees: (Sweden) Tobias Björk (Canada) Adam Bloski; Linesmen: (United States) Jake Davis (Denmark) Andreas Krøyer
0–1 / 20:15 – Pánik (Regenda, Koch)			Referees: (Sweden) Tobias Björk (Canada) Adam Bloski; Linesmen: (United States) Jake Davis (Denmark) Andreas Krøyer
4 min	Penalties	6 min	Referees: (Sweden) Tobias Björk (Canada) Adam Bloski; Linesmen: (United States) Jake Davis (Denmark) Andreas Krøyer
33	Shots	39	Referees: (Sweden) Tobias Björk (Canada) Adam Bloski; Linesmen: (United States) Jake Davis (Denmark) Andreas Krøyer

=== Czechia vs Switzerland ===
21 May 2023; 20:20	Czechia	2–4 (1–1, 0–2, 1–1)	Switzerland	Arena Riga, Riga; Attendance: 7,150

Game reference

Marek Langhamer
Goalies
Robert Mayer
Referees:
(Finland) Mikko Kaukokari
(United States) Sean MacFarlane
Linesmen:
(Finland) Onni Hautamäki
(Canada) Tarrington Wyonzek

Červenka – 06:47	1–0
	1–1	12:41 – Loeffel (Hischier, Fiala) (PP)
	1–2	23:59 – Ambühl (Corvi, Kukan)
	1–3	28:37 – Ambühl (Fiala, Malgin)
Kubalík (Červenka, Kempný) – 52:14	2–3
	2–4	55:40 – Richard (Moser, Riat)

4 min
Penalties
4 min
22
Shots
27

=== Canada vs Norway ===
22 May 2023; 16:20	Canada	2–3 GWS (0–1, 1–1, 1–0) (OT: 0–0) (SO: 0–1)	Norway	Arena Riga, Riga; Attendance: 4,834

Game reference

Joel Hofer
Goalies
Jonas Arntzen
Referees:
(Denmark) Mads Frandsen
(United States) Sean MacFarlane
Linesmen:
(Finland) Onni Hautamäki
(Slovakia) Šimon Synek

	0–1	09:45 – Martinsen (Olimb)
	0–2	21:52 – Olden (E. Salsten)
Lucic (Weegar, Middleton) – 28:26	1–2
Crouse (Carcone) (EA) – 59:48	2–2

Quinn (miss)
Glass
Toffoli
Carcone (miss)
Shootout
Hansen
Olden
Trettenes
(miss) Haga
Olsen
29 min
Penalties
2 min
33
Shots
24

=== Kazakhstan vs Slovenia ===
22 May 2023; 20:20	Kazakhstan	4–3 (1–1, 1–1, 2–1)	Slovenia	Arena Riga, Riga; Attendance: 4,140

Game reference

Andrei Shutov
Goalies
Žan Us
Referees:
(Sweden) Tobias Björk
(Finland) Mikko Kaukokari
Linesmen:
(United States) Jake Davis
(Czech Republic) Jiří Ondráček

	0–1	01:30 – Kuralt
Mikhailis (Rymarev, Beketayev) (PP) – 18:10	1–1
	1–2	21:06 – Kuralt (Ograjenšek, Tičar)
Muratov (Orekhov, Savitski) (PP) – 39:02	2–2
	2–3	42:27 – Drozg (Simšič, Pance)
Rymarev (Starchenko, Beketayev) – 51:52	3–3
Mukhametov (Mikhailis) – 56:33	4–3

4 min
Penalties
6 min
32
Shots
26

=== Slovakia vs Norway ===
23 May 2023; 12:20	Slovakia	4–1 (3–0, 0–1, 1–0)	Norway	Arena Riga, Riga; Attendance: 4,170

Game reference

Stanislav Škorvánek
Goalies
Henrik Haukeland
Referees:
(Canada) Adam Bloski
(Germany) Sirko Hunnius
Linesmen:
(Switzerland) Eric Cattaneo
(Canada) Tarrington Wyonzek

Hrivík (Pánik, Regenda) – 03:58	1–0
Cehlárik (Rosandić, Kňažko) – 07:30	2–0
Lantoši (Gajdoš) – 15:43	3–0
	3–1	23:10 – Vikingstad (Berg-Paulsen, Olsen)
Pánik (EN) – 58:41	4–1

2 min
Penalties
4 min
35
Shots
25

=== Canada vs Czechia ===
23 May 2023; 16:20	Canada	3–1 (1–0, 0–1, 2–0)	Czechia	Arena Riga, Riga; Attendance: 6,420

Game reference

Sam Montembeault
Goalies
Karel Vejmelka
Referees:
(Latvia) Andris Ansons
(Switzerland) Miroslav Stolc
Linesmen:
(Slovakia) Šimon Synek
(Latvia) Dāvis Zunde

Krebs (Glass, Hunt) (PP) – 19:12	1–0
	1–1	22:06 – Kaut (Flek, Dvořák)
Myers (Quinn, Laughton) – 44:09	2–1
Crouse (Laughton) (EN) – 59:24	3–1

4 min
Penalties
4 min
44
Shots
17

=== Switzerland vs Latvia ===
23 May 2023; 20:20	Switzerland	3–4 OT (0–0, 1–2, 2–1) (OT: 0–1)	Latvia	Arena Riga, Riga; Attendance: 9,178

Game reference

Joren van Pottelberghe
Goalies
Artūrs Šilovs
Referees:
(Finland) Mikko Kaukokari
(United States) Sean MacFarlane
Linesmen:
(Canada) Brett Mackey
(Czech Republic) Jiří Ondráček

	0–1	21:43 – Freibergs (Indrašis)
Fiala (Corvi) – 26:02	1–1
	1–2	26:34 – Ābols (Balcers, Freibergs)
Miranda (Riat, Corvi) – 47:03	2–2
Ambühl (Fiala, Corvi) – 53:46	3–2
	3–3	54:56 – Daugaviņš (Ābols, Balcers)
	3–4	62:25 – Balcers (Balinskis, Jaks) (PP)

12 min
Penalties
6 min
32
Shots
28
