= 2023 IIHF World Championship playoff round =

International ice hockey results

The playoff round of the 2023 IIHF World Championship was held from 25 to 28 May 2023. The top four of each preliminary group qualified for the playoff round.

== Qualified teams ==
| Group | Winners | Runners-up | Third place | Fourth place |
|---|---|---|---|---|
| A | United States | Sweden | Finland | Germany |
| B | Switzerland | Canada | Latvia | Czechia |

=== Seedings ===
Quarter-finalists were paired according to their positions in the groups: the first-place team in each preliminary-round group played the fourth-place team of the other group, while the second-place team played the third-place team of the other group.

Semi-finalists were paired according to their seeding after the preliminary round, which was determined by the following criteria. The best-ranked semi-finalist played against the lowest-ranked semi-finalist, while the second-best-ranked semi-finalist played the third-best-ranked semi-finalist.

| Rank | Team | Grp | Pos | Pts | GD | GF | Seed |
|---|---|---|---|---|---|---|---|
| 1 | United States | A | 1 | 20 | +26 | 34 | 3 |
| 2 | Switzerland | B | 1 | 19 | +19 | 29 | 6 |
| 3 | Sweden | A | 2 | 18 | +19 | 26 | 4 |
| 4 | Canada | B | 2 | 15 | +14 | 25 | 2 |
| 5 | Finland | A | 3 | 16 | +13 | 28 | 1 |
| 6 | Latvia | B | 3 | 13 | +4 | 21 | 10 |
| 7 | Czechia | B | 4 | 13 | +6 | 22 | 5 |
| 8 | Germany | A | 4 | 12 | +11 | 27 | 8 |

Classification rules: 1) position in the group; 2) number of points; 3) goal difference; 4) number of goals scored for; 5) seeding number entering the tournament

== Bracket ==
There was a re-seeding after the quarter-finals. If Finland and Latvia were to play in the quarter-finals, there would have been no cross-over for the quarter-finals.

Quarter-finals
25 May
1A United States | 3
4B Czechia | 0
25 May
1B Switzerland | 1
4A Germany | 3
25 May
2A Sweden | 1
3B Latvia | 3
25 May
2B Canada | 4
3A Finland | 1

Semi-finals
27 May
1 United States | 3
8 Germany (OT) | 4
27 May
4 Canada | 4
6 Latvia | 2

Final
28 May
8 Germany | 2
4 Canada | 5
Third place
28 May
1 United States | 3
6 Latvia (OT) | 4

All times are local (UTC+3).

== Quarter-finals ==
| 25 May 2023; 16:20 | United States | 3–0 (1–0, 1–0, 1–0) | Czechia | Nokia Arena, Tampere; Attendance: 7,411 |

Game reference

Casey DeSmith
Goalies
Karel Vejmelka
Referees:
(Denmark) Mads Frandsen
(United Kingdom) Liam Sewell
Linesmen:
(Canada) Tarrington Wyonzek
(Sweden) Emil Yletyinen

| Coronato (Hutson, Mackey) – 12:04 | 1–0 |
| Perbix (Grimaldi) – 28:53 | 2–0 |
| Gauthier (Tynan) – 49:57 | 3–0 |

4 min
Penalties
2 min
34
Shots
15

| 25 May 2023; 16:20 | Switzerland | 1–3 (0–1, 1–2, 0–0) | Germany | Arena Riga, Riga; Attendance: 2,896 |

Game reference

Robert Mayer
Goalies
Mathias Niederberger
Referees:
(Latvia) Andris Ansons
(Sweden) Tobias Björk
Linesmen:
(Finland) Onni Hautamäki
(Latvia) Dāvis Zunde

| | 0–1 | 06:25 – Kastner (Wissmann, J. Müller) |
| Siegenthaler (Fiala, Kukan) – 20:47 | 1–1 |
| | 1–2 | 37:51 – Peterka (Kahun, Gawanke) |
| | 1–3 | 38:27 – Sturm (Stachowiak, J. Müller) (SH) |

8 min
Penalties
29 min
30
Shots
23

| 25 May 2023; 20:20 | Canada | 4–1 (1–0, 1–0, 2–1) | Finland | Nokia Arena, Tampere; Attendance: 11,529 |

Game reference

Sam Montembeault
Goalies
Emil Larmi
Referees:
(Sweden) Christoffer Holm
(Czech Republic) Jan Hribik
Linesmen:
(United States) Nick Briganti
(Czech Republic) Daniel Hynek

| Quinn (Crouse) – 07:12 | 1–0 |
| Blais (Neighbours, Barron) – 30:45 | 2–0 |
| Carcone (Weegar, Middleton) – 42:54 | 3–0 |
| | 3–1 | 56:52 – Hartikainen (Rantanen, Lehtonen) (EA) |
| Toffoli (EN) – 57:42 | 4–1 |

6 min
Penalties
0 min
31
Shots
28

| 25 May 2023; 20:20 | Sweden | 1–3 (0–1, 1–0, 0–2) | Latvia | Arena Riga, Riga; Attendance: 9,200 |

Game reference

Lars Johansson
Goalies
Artūrs Šilovs
Referees:
(Finland) Mikko Kaukokari
(United States) Sean MacFarlane
Linesmen:
(United States) Jake Davis
(Canada) Brett Mackey

| | 0–1 | 12:56 – Ločmelis (Ri. Bukarts, Cibuļskis) |
| Liljegren (Raymond, Lindholm) – 29:41 | 1–1 |
| | 1–2 | 45:55 – Indrašis (Ri. Bukarts, Jaks) |
| | 1–3 | 53:46 – Jaks (Indrašis, Ri. Bukarts) (PP) |

4 min
Penalties
33 min
41
Shots
15

== Semi-finals ==
| 27 May 2023; 14:20 | Canada | 4–2 (0–1, 1–1, 3–0) | Latvia | Nokia Arena, Tampere; Attendance: 8,669 |

Game reference

Sam Montembeault
Goalies
Artūrs Šilovs
Referees:
(Finland) Mikko Kaukokari
(United States) Sean MacFarlane
Linesmen:
(United States) Nick Briganti
(United States) Jake Davis

| | 0–1 | 08:18 – Ločmelis (Ri. Bukarts, Zīle) |
| Blais (Krebs, Middleton) – 35:32 | 1–1 |
| | 1–2 | 36:38 – Balcers |
| Quinn (Crouse, Laughton) – 40:45 | 2–2 |
| Fantilli (Lucic, Barron) – 48:56 | 3–2 |
| Laughton (EN) – 59:17 | 4–2 |

12 min
Penalties
12 min
36
Shots
22

| 27 May 2023; 18:20 | United States | 3–4 OT (2–2, 1–0, 0–1) (OT: 0–1) | Germany | Nokia Arena, Tampere; Attendance: 8,011 |

Game reference

Casey DeSmith
Goalies
Mathias Niederberger
Referees:
(Sweden) Tobias Björk
(Czech Republic) Jan Hribik
Linesmen:
(Finland) Onni Hautamäki
(Czech Republic) Jiří Ondráček

| A. Tuch (O'Connor, Grimaldi) – 01:11 | 1–0 |
| Grimaldi (A. Tuch) – 03:56 | 2–0 |
| | 2–1 | 12:22 – Tiffels (Fischbuch, Kahun) (PP) |
| | 2–2 | 16:03 – Szuber (Sturm, Peterka) |
| Eyssimont (O'Connor, Garland) – 28:47 | 3–2 |
| | 3–3 | 58:37 – Noebels (Kahun, Gawanke) (EA) |
| | 3–4 | 67:32 – Tiffels (Kahun, M. Müller) |

6 min
Penalties
4 min
33
Shots
26

== Bronze medal game ==
| 28 May 2023; 15:20 | United States | 3–4 OT (2–2, 0–0, 1–1) (OT: 0–1) | Latvia | Nokia Arena, Tampere; Attendance: 11,033 |

Game reference

Casey DeSmith
Goalies
Artūrs Šilovs
Referees:
(Czech Republic) Jan Hribik
(United Kingdom) Liam Sewell
Linesmen:
(Finland) Onni Hautamäki
(Canada) Tarrington Wyonzek

| | 0–1 | 07:49 – Ro. Bukarts (Ri. Bukarts, Dzierkals) (PP) |
| Grimaldi (Perunovich, Bjork) – 09:45 | 1–1 |
| | 1–2 | 16:08 – Jaks (Ri. Bukarts, Indrašis) |
| Grimaldi (Perunovich, Coronato) (PP) – 19:03 | 2–2 |
| Coronato (Samberg, O'Connor) – 46:19 | 3–2 |
| | 3–3 | 54:21 – Rubīns (Ločmelis, Ri. Bukarts) |
| | 3–4 | 61:22 – Rubīns (Daugaviņš, Jaks) |

10 min
Penalties
8 min
29
Shots
25

== Gold medal game ==
| 28 May 2023; 20:20 | Canada | 5–2 (1–1, 1–1, 3–0) | Germany | Nokia Arena, Tampere; Attendance: 10,470 |

Game reference

Sam Montembeault
Goalies
Mathias Niederberger
Referees:
(Sweden) Tobias Björk
(United States) Sean MacFarlane
Linesmen:
(United States) Nick Briganti
(Czech Republic) Daniel Hynek

| | 0–1 | 07:44 – Peterka (Seider, M. Müller) |
| Blais (Krebs, Neighbours) – 10:47 | 1–1 |
| | 1–2 | 33:47 – Fischbuch (Kastner, Seider) |
| Crouse (Krebs, Weegar) (PP) – 37:28 | 2–2 |
| Blais (Glass) – 44:51 | 3–2 |
| Toffoli – 51:51 | 4–2 |
| Laughton (Quinn, Crouse) (EN) – 58:06 | 5–2 |

4 min
Penalties
2 min
28
Shots
23
