= 2023 IIHF World Championship final =

Ice hockey match

	1	2	3	Total
Canada	1	1	3	5
Germany	1	1	0	2
- Date: 28 May 2023
- Arena: Nokia Arena
- City: Tampere
- Attendance: 10,470

The 2023 IIHF World Championship final was played at the Nokia Arena in Tampere, Finland on 28 May 2023.

Canada and Germany faced each other for the first time in the finals. This marked the first time Germany has advanced to the gold medal game in Ice Hockey World Championships history. Canada won 5–2 for a record 28th World Championship title.

== Road to the final ==
Canada
Round
Germany
Opponent
Result
Preliminary round
Opponent
Result
Latvia
6–0
Game 1
Sweden
0–1
Slovenia
5–2
Game 2
Finland
3–4
Slovakia
2–1 (GWS)
Game 3
United States
2–3
Kazakhstan
5–1
Game 4
Denmark
6–4
Switzerland
2–3
Game 5
Austria
4–2
Norway
2–3 (GWS)
Game 6
Hungary
7–2
Czechia
3–1
Game 7
France
5–0

Pos	Team	Pld	Pts
1	Switzerland	7	19
2	Canada	7	15
3	Latvia (H)	7	13
4	Czechia	7	13
5	Slovakia	7	11
6	Kazakhstan	7	7
7	Norway	7	6
8	Slovenia	7	0

Source: IIHF
(H) Host
Preliminary

Pos	Team	Pld	Pts
1	United States	7	20
2	Sweden	7	18
3	Finland (H)	7	16
4	Germany	7	12
5	Denmark	7	8
6	France	7	4
7	Austria	7	3
8	Hungary	7	3

Source: IIHF
(H) Host
Opponent
Result
Playoff
Opponent
Result
Finland
4–1
Quarterfinals
Switzerland
3–1
Latvia
4–2
Semifinals
United States
4–3 (OT)

== Match ==
28 May 2023; 20:20	Canada	5–2 (1–1, 1–1, 3–0)	Germany	Nokia Arena, Tampere; Attendance: 10,470

Game reference

Sam Montembeault
Goalies
Mathias Niederberger
Referees:
(Sweden) Tobias Björk
(United States) Sean MacFarlane
Linesmen:
(United States) Nick Briganti
(Czech Republic) Daniel Hynek

	0–1	07:44 – Peterka (Seider, M. Müller)
Blais (Krebs, Neighbours) – 10:47	1–1
	1–2	33:47 – Fischbuch (Kastner, Seider)
Crouse (Krebs, Weegar) (PP) – 37:28	2–2
Blais (Glass) – 44:51	3–2
Toffoli – 51:51	4–2
Laughton (Quinn, Crouse) (EN) – 58:06	5–2

4 min
Penalties
2 min
28
Shots
23
