= 2023 Men's Ice Hockey World Championships =

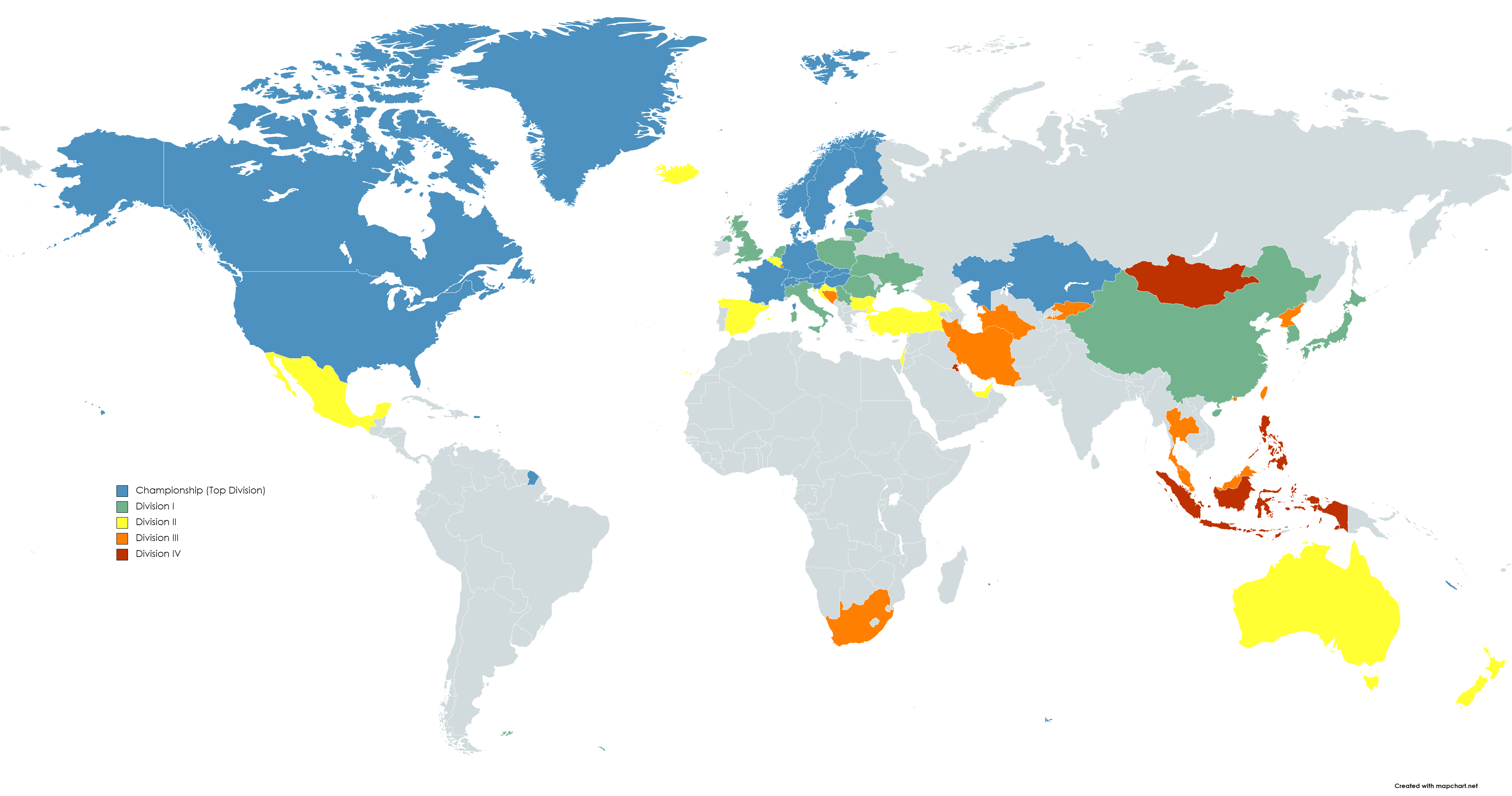
Map of the countries participating at the 2023 IIHF World Championship

The 2023 Men's Ice Hockey World Championships were the 86th such event hosted by the International Ice Hockey Federation. Teams participated in several levels of competition. The competition also served as qualifications for division placements in the 2024 competition.

As in 2022, teams from Russia and Belarus were not allowed to enter, as they were suspended by the IIHF due to the countries' invasion of Ukraine.

== Championship (Top Division) ==
The tournament was held in Tampere, Finland and Riga, Latvia from 12 to 28 May 2023.

=== Group A ===
| Pos | Team | Pld | W | OTW | OTL | L | GF | GA | GD | Pts | Qualification or relegation |
|---|---|---|---|---|---|---|---|---|---|---|---|
| 1 | United States | 7 | 6 | 1 | 0 | 0 | 34 | 8 | +26 | 20 | Quarterfinals |
| 2 | Sweden | 7 | 5 | 1 | 1 | 0 | 26 | 7 | +19 | 18 | Quarterfinals |
| 3 | Finland (H) | 7 | 5 | 0 | 1 | 1 | 28 | 15 | +13 | 16 | Quarterfinals |
| 4 | Germany | 7 | 4 | 0 | 0 | 3 | 27 | 16 | +11 | 12 | Quarterfinals |
| 5 | Denmark | 7 | 2 | 1 | 0 | 4 | 19 | 26 | −7 | 8 | Qualification for 2024 IIHF World Championship |
| 6 | France | 7 | 0 | 1 | 2 | 4 | 10 | 31 | −21 | 4 | Qualification for 2024 IIHF World Championship |
| 7 | Austria | 7 | 0 | 1 | 1 | 5 | 11 | 27 | −16 | 3 (Note: Austria 4–3 Hungary) | Qualification for 2024 IIHF World Championship |
| 8 | Hungary | 7 | 0 | 1 | 1 | 5 | 12 | 37 | −25 | 3 | Relegation to 2024 Division I A |

Source: IIHF
Rules for classification: 1) points; 2) head-to-head points; 3) head-to-head goal difference; 4) head-to-head number of goals scored; 5) result against closest best-ranked team outside tied teams; 6) result against second-best-ranked team outside tied teams; 7) seeding before tournament
(H) Host

=== Group B ===
| Pos | Team | Pld | W | OTW | OTL | L | GF | GA | GD | Pts | Qualification or relegation |
|---|---|---|---|---|---|---|---|---|---|---|---|
| 1 | Switzerland | 7 | 6 | 0 | 1 | 0 | 29 | 10 | +19 | 19 | Quarterfinals |
| 2 | Canada | 7 | 4 | 1 | 1 | 1 | 25 | 11 | +14 | 15 | Quarterfinals |
| 3 | Latvia (H) | 7 | 3 | 2 | 0 | 2 | 21 | 17 | +4 | 13 (Note: Czechia 3–4 (OT) Latvia) | Quarterfinals |
| 4 | Czechia | 7 | 4 | 0 | 1 | 2 | 22 | 16 | +6 | 13 | Quarterfinals |
| 5 | Slovakia | 7 | 3 | 0 | 2 | 2 | 15 | 15 | 0 | 11 | Qualification for 2024 IIHF World Championship |
| 6 | Kazakhstan | 7 | 1 | 2 | 0 | 4 | 14 | 31 | −17 | 7 | Qualification for 2024 IIHF World Championship |
| 7 | Norway | 7 | 1 | 1 | 1 | 4 | 9 | 17 | −8 | 6 | Qualification for 2024 IIHF World Championship |
| 8 | Slovenia | 7 | 0 | 0 | 0 | 7 | 9 | 27 | −18 | 0 | Relegation to 2024 Division I A |

Source: IIHF
Rules for classification: 1) points; 2) head-to-head points; 3) head-to-head goal difference; 4) head-to-head number of goals scored; 5) result against closest best-ranked team outside tied teams; 6) result against second-best-ranked team outside tied teams; 7) seeding before tournament
(H) Host

=== Playoff round ===
There was a re-seeding after the quarter-finals. If Finland and Latvia were to play in the quarter-finals, there would have been no cross-over for the quarter-finals.

Quarter-finals
25 May
1A United States | 3
4B Czechia | 0
25 May
1B Switzerland | 1
4A Germany | 3
25 May
2A Sweden | 1
3B Latvia | 3
25 May
2B Canada | 4
3A Finland | 1

Semi-finals
27 May
1 United States | 3
8 Germany (OT) | 4
27 May
4 Canada | 4
6 Latvia | 2

Final
28 May
8 Germany | 2
4 Canada | 5
Third place
28 May
1 United States | 3
6 Latvia (OT) | 4

=== Final standings ===
Teams finishing fifth in the preliminary round were ranked ninth and tenth, teams finishing sixth are ranked 11th and 12th, and so on.

| Pos | Grp | Team | Pld | W | OTW | OTL | L | GF | GA | GD | Pts | Final result |
|---|---|---|---|---|---|---|---|---|---|---|---|---|
| 1 | B | Canada | 10 | 7 | 1 | 1 | 1 | 38 | 16 | +22 | 24 | Champions |
| 2 | A | Germany | 10 | 5 | 1 | 0 | 4 | 36 | 25 | +11 | 17 | Runners-up |
| 3 | B | Latvia (H) | 10 | 4 | 3 | 0 | 3 | 30 | 25 | +5 | 18 | Third place |
| 4 | A | United States | 10 | 7 | 1 | 2 | 0 | 43 | 16 | +27 | 25 | Fourth place |
| 5 | B | Switzerland | 8 | 6 | 0 | 1 | 1 | 30 | 13 | +17 | 19 | Eliminated in Quarter-finals |
| 6 | A | Sweden | 8 | 5 | 1 | 1 | 1 | 27 | 10 | +17 | 18 | Eliminated in Quarter-finals |
| 7 | A | Finland (H) | 8 | 5 | 0 | 1 | 2 | 29 | 19 | +10 | 16 | Eliminated in Quarter-finals |
| 8 | B | Czechia | 8 | 4 | 0 | 1 | 3 | 22 | 19 | +3 | 13 | Eliminated in Quarter-finals |
| 9 | B | Slovakia | 7 | 3 | 0 | 2 | 2 | 15 | 15 | 0 | 11 | Eliminated in Group stage |
| 10 | A | Denmark | 7 | 2 | 1 | 0 | 4 | 19 | 26 | −7 | 8 | Eliminated in Group stage |
| 11 | B | Kazakhstan | 7 | 1 | 2 | 0 | 4 | 14 | 31 | −17 | 7 | Eliminated in Group stage |
| 12 | A | France | 7 | 0 | 1 | 2 | 4 | 10 | 31 | −21 | 4 | Eliminated in Group stage |
| 13 | B | Norway | 7 | 1 | 1 | 1 | 4 | 9 | 17 | −8 | 6 | Eliminated in Group stage |
| 14 | A | Austria | 7 | 0 | 1 | 1 | 5 | 11 | 27 | −16 | 3 | Eliminated in Group stage |
| 15 | A | Hungary | 7 | 0 | 1 | 1 | 5 | 12 | 37 | −25 | 3 | Relegated to 2024 IIHF World Championship Division I |
| 16 | B | Slovenia | 7 | 0 | 0 | 0 | 7 | 9 | 27 | −18 | 0 | Relegated to 2024 IIHF World Championship Division I |

Source: IIHF
Rules for classification: 1) position in the group; 2) number of points; 3) goal difference; 4) goals scored; 5) seeding before tournament.
(H) Host

== Division I ==
=== Group A ===
The tournament was held in Nottingham, England from 29 April to 5 May 2023.

| Pos | Team | Pld | W | OTW | OTL | L | GF | GA | GD | Pts | Promotion or relegation |
|---|---|---|---|---|---|---|---|---|---|---|---|
| 1 | Great Britain (H) | 5 | 4 | 1 | 0 | 0 | 24 | 7 | +17 | 14 | Promoted to the 2024 Top Division |
| 2 | Poland | 5 | 4 | 0 | 1 | 0 | 28 | 9 | +19 | 13 | Promoted to the 2024 Top Division |
| 3 | Italy | 5 | 3 | 0 | 0 | 2 | 23 | 16 | +7 | 9 | |
| 4 | South Korea | 5 | 2 | 0 | 0 | 3 | 8 | 20 | −12 | 6 | |
| 5 | Romania | 5 | 1 | 0 | 0 | 4 | 9 | 26 | −17 | 3 | |
| 6 | Lithuania | 5 | 0 | 0 | 0 | 5 | 7 | 21 | −14 | 0 | Relegated to the 2024 Division I B |

Source: IIHF
Rules for classification: 1) points; 2) head-to-head points; 3) head-to-head goal difference; 4) head-to-head number of goals scored; 5) result against closest best-ranked team outside tied teams; 6) result against second-best ranked team outside tied teams; 7) seeding before tournament.
(H) Host

=== Group B ===
The tournament was held in Tallinn, Estonia from 23 to 29 April 2023.

| Pos | Team | Pld | W | OTW | OTL | L | GF | GA | GD | Pts | Promotion or relegation |
|---|---|---|---|---|---|---|---|---|---|---|---|
| 1 | Japan | 5 | 5 | 0 | 0 | 0 | 29 | 10 | +19 | 15 | Promoted to the 2024 Division I A |
| 2 | Ukraine | 5 | 3 | 0 | 1 | 1 | 35 | 16 | +19 | 10 | |
| 3 | China | 5 | 2 | 1 | 0 | 2 | 19 | 18 | +1 | 8 | |
| 4 | Estonia (H) | 5 | 1 | 1 | 0 | 3 | 13 | 18 | −5 | 5 | |
| 5 | Netherlands | 5 | 1 | 0 | 1 | 3 | 14 | 31 | −17 | 4 | |
| 6 | Serbia | 5 | 0 | 1 | 1 | 3 | 7 | 24 | −17 | 3 | Relegated to the 2024 Division II A |

Source: IIHF
Rules for classification: 1) points; 2) head-to-head points; 3) head-to-head goal difference; 4) head-to-head number of goals scored; 5) result against closest best-ranked team outside tied teams; 6) result against second-best ranked team outside tied teams; 7) seeding before tournament.
(H) Host

== Division II ==
=== Group A ===
The tournament was held in Madrid, Spain from 16 to 22 April 2023. Georgia was later disqualified by the IIHF and relegated.

| Pos | Team | Pld | W | OTW | OTL | L | GF | GA | GD | Pts | Promotion or relegation |
|---|---|---|---|---|---|---|---|---|---|---|---|
| 1 | Spain (H) | 5 | 5 | 0 | 0 | 0 | 30 | 9 | +21 | 15 | Promoted to the 2024 Division I B |
| 2 | Georgia | 5 | 4 | 0 | 0 | 1 | 20 | 8 | +12 | 12 | Relegated to the 2024 Division II B |
| 3 | Croatia | 5 | 3 | 0 | 0 | 2 | 26 | 18 | +8 | 9 | |
| 4 | Australia | 5 | 1 | 0 | 0 | 4 | 16 | 22 | −6 | 3 (Note: Australia 3 points, +4 GD; Israel 3 points, −2 GD; Iceland 3 points, −2 GD; Israel 7–3 Iceland) | |
| 5 | Israel | 5 | 1 | 0 | 0 | 4 | 14 | 37 | −23 | 3 | |
| 6 | Iceland | 5 | 1 | 0 | 0 | 4 | 14 | 26 | −12 | 3 | |

Source: IIHF
Rules for classification: 1) points; 2) head-to-head points; 3) head-to-head goal difference; 4) head-to-head number of goals scored; 5) result against closest best-ranked team outside tied teams; 6) result against second-best ranked team outside tied teams; 7) seeding before tournament.
(H) Host

=== Group B ===
The tournament was held in Istanbul, Turkey from 17 to 23 April 2023.

| Pos | Team | Pld | W | OTW | OTL | L | GF | GA | GD | Pts | Promotion or relegation |
|---|---|---|---|---|---|---|---|---|---|---|---|
| 1 | United Arab Emirates | 5 | 5 | 0 | 0 | 0 | 35 | 10 | +25 | 15 | Promoted to the 2024 Division II A |
| 2 | Belgium | 5 | 4 | 0 | 0 | 1 | 33 | 10 | +23 | 12 | |
| 3 | Bulgaria | 5 | 3 | 0 | 0 | 2 | 19 | 20 | −1 | 9 | |
| 4 | New Zealand | 5 | 2 | 0 | 0 | 3 | 15 | 22 | −7 | 6 | |
| 5 | Turkey (H) | 5 | 1 | 0 | 0 | 4 | 12 | 26 | −14 | 3 | |
| 6 | Mexico | 5 | 0 | 0 | 0 | 5 | 10 | 36 | −26 | 0 | Relegated to the 2024 Division III A |

Source: IIHF
Rules for classification: 1) points; 2) head-to-head points; 3) head-to-head goal difference; 4) head-to-head number of goals scored; 5) result against closest best-ranked team outside tied teams; 6) result against second-best ranked team outside tied teams; 7) seeding before tournament.
(H) Host

== Division III ==
=== Group A ===
The tournament was held in Cape Town, South Africa from 17 to 23 April 2023.

| Pos | Team | Pld | W | OTW | OTL | L | GF | GA | GD | Pts | Promotion or relegation |
|---|---|---|---|---|---|---|---|---|---|---|---|
| 1 | Chinese Taipei | 4 | 4 | 0 | 0 | 0 | 30 | 4 | +26 | 12 | Promoted to the 2024 Division II B |
| 2 | Turkmenistan | 4 | 2 | 0 | 0 | 2 | 17 | 16 | +1 | 6 (Note: Turkmenistan 3 points, 0 GD, 12 GS; South Africa 3 points, 0 GD, 11 GS; Thailand 3 points, 0 GD, 8 GS) | |
| 3 | South Africa (H) | 4 | 2 | 0 | 0 | 2 | 16 | 17 | −1 | 6 | |
| 4 | Thailand | 4 | 2 | 0 | 0 | 2 | 20 | 21 | −1 | 6 | |
| 5 | Luxembourg | 4 | 0 | 0 | 0 | 4 | 3 | 28 | −25 | 0 | |
| 6 | North Korea (Note: North Korea withdrew before the tournament.) | 0 | 0 | 0 | 0 | 0 | 0 | 0 | 0 | 0 | Relegated to the 2024 Division III B |

Source: IIHF
Rules for classification: 1) points; 2) head-to-head points; 3) head-to-head goal difference; 4) head-to-head number of goals scored; 5) result against closest best-ranked team outside tied teams; 6) result against second-best ranked team outside tied teams; 7) seeding before tournament.
(H) Host

=== Group B ===
The tournament was held in Sarajevo, Bosnia and Herzegovina from 27 February to 5 March 2023.

| Pos | Team | Pld | W | OTW | OTL | L | GF | GA | GD | Pts | Promotion or relegation |
|---|---|---|---|---|---|---|---|---|---|---|---|
| 1 | Kyrgyzstan | 5 | 5 | 0 | 0 | 0 | 76 | 5 | +71 | 15 | Promoted to the 2024 Division III A |
| 2 | Bosnia and Herzegovina (H) | 5 | 3 | 1 | 0 | 1 | 39 | 20 | +19 | 11 | |
| 3 | Hong Kong | 5 | 2 | 1 | 1 | 1 | 41 | 26 | +15 | 9 | |
| 4 | Singapore | 5 | 2 | 0 | 1 | 2 | 31 | 31 | 0 | 7 | |
| 5 | Iran | 5 | 1 | 0 | 0 | 4 | 19 | 53 | −34 | 3 | |
| 6 | Malaysia | 5 | 0 | 0 | 0 | 5 | 6 | 77 | −71 | 0 | Relegated to the 2024 Division IV |

Source: IIHF
Rules for classification: 1) points; 2) head-to-head points; 3) head-to-head goal difference; 4) head-to-head number of goals scored; 5) result against closest best-ranked team outside tied teams; 6) result against second-best ranked team outside tied teams; 7) seeding before tournament.
(H) Host

== Division IV ==
The tournament was held in Ulaanbaatar, Mongolia from 23 to 26 March 2023.

| Pos | Team | Pld | W | OTW | OTL | L | GF | GA | GD | Pts | Promotion |
|---|---|---|---|---|---|---|---|---|---|---|---|
| 1 | Philippines | 3 | 2 | 1 | 0 | 0 | 35 | 6 | +29 | 8 | Promoted to the 2024 Division III B |
| 2 | Mongolia (H) | 3 | 2 | 0 | 1 | 0 | 19 | 8 | +11 | 7 | |
| 3 | Kuwait | 3 | 1 | 0 | 0 | 2 | 4 | 24 | −20 | 3 | |
| 4 | Indonesia | 3 | 0 | 0 | 0 | 3 | 3 | 23 | −20 | 0 | |

Source: IIHF
Rules for classification: 1) points; 2) head-to-head points; 3) head-to-head goal difference; 4) head-to-head number of goals scored; 5) result against closest best-ranked team outside tied teams; 6) result against second-best ranked team outside tied teams; 7) seeding before tournament.
(H) Host
