= Tomáš Dvořák (ice hockey) =

Czech ice hockey player

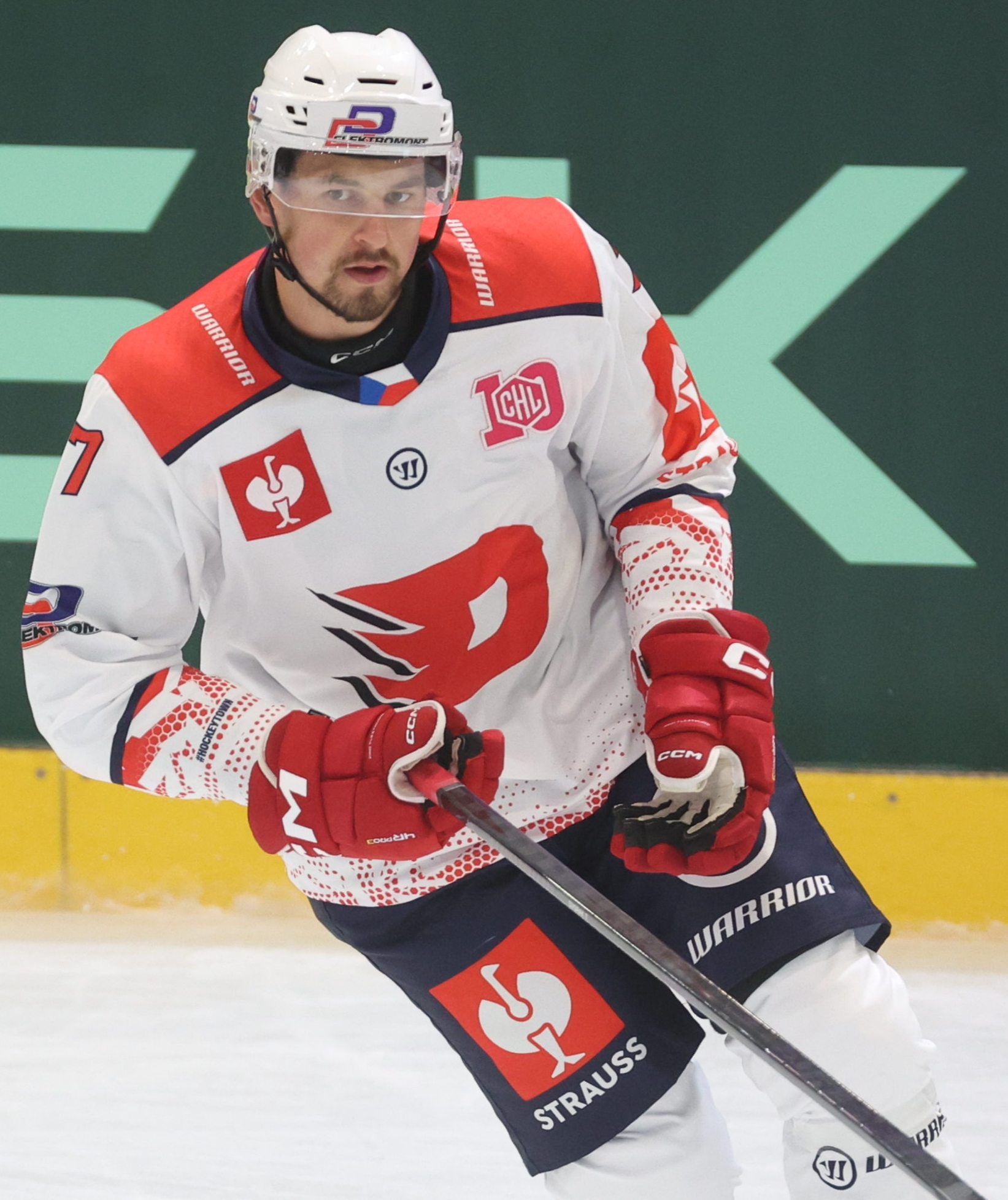
- Tomáš Dvořák, 2024
- Born: May 7, 1995 (age 31) Havlíčkův Brod, Czech Republic
- Height: 6 ft 4 in (193 cm)
- Weight: 218 lb (99 kg; 15 st 8 lb)
- Position: Defence
- Shoots: Left
- ELH team Former teams: HC Dynamo Pardubice; HC Karlovy Vary; Piráti Chomutov
- National team: Czech Republic
- Playing career: 2014–present

Tomáš Dvořák (born May 7, 1995) is a Czech professional ice hockey defenceman. He is currently playing with HC Dynamo Pardubice of the Czech Extraliga (ELH).

Dvořák made his Czech Extraliga debut playing with HC Karlovy Vary during the 2013–14 Czech Extraliga season.
