= Sam Montembeault =

Canadian ice hockey player (born 1996)

Samuel Montembeault
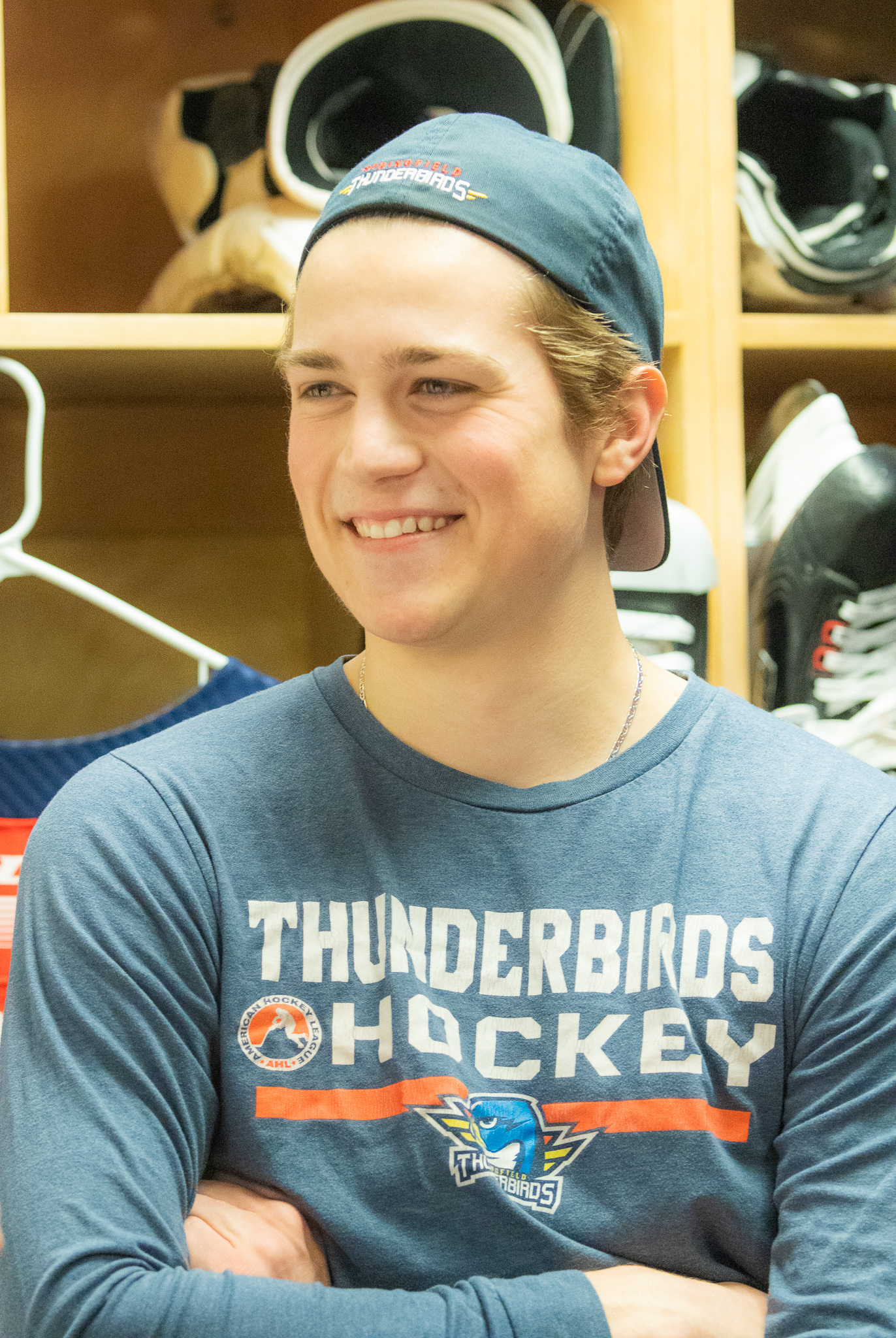
- Montembeault with the Springfield Thunderbirds in 2019
- Born: October 30, 1996 (age 30) Bécancour, Quebec, Canada
- Height: 6 ft 3 in (191 cm)
- Weight: 218 lb (99 kg; 15 st 8 lb)
- Position: Goaltender
- Catches: Left
- NHL team Former teams: Montreal Canadiens; Florida Panthers
- National team: Canada
- NHL draft: 77th overall, 2015; Florida Panthers
- Playing career: 2017–present

Samuel Montembeault (Note: French pronunciation: [mɔ̃tɑ̃bo]) (born October 30, 1996) is a Canadian professional ice hockey player who is a goaltender for the Montreal Canadiens of the National Hockey League (NHL). He was selected in the third round, 77th overall, by the Florida Panthers in the 2015 NHL entry draft. He played major junior for four seasons with the Blainville-Boisbriand Armada, before playing two seasons with the Florida Panthers. He was later placed on waivers by the team in October 2021, before he was claimed by the Montreal Canadiens.

Internationally, Montembeault represented the Canada junior team in 2016. He represented the Canada senior team at the 2023 IIHF World Championship, winning gold at the tournament. He was selected to represent the country again at the 2025 4 Nations Face-Off, where he won gold with Canada at the tournament.

== Playing career ==
=== Junior ===
Montembeault first played midget hockey in his native Quebec, with the Trois-Rivières Estacades of the Quebec Junior AAA Hockey League (QMAAA) from 2011 to 2013. Showing early promise as the starting goaltender with the Estacades, Montembeault was named to the QMAAA Second All-Star Team and received the league's Best Goalie Prospect award for the 2012–13 season. He was then selected 40th overall by the Blainville-Boisbriand Armada in the 2013 Quebec Major Junior Hockey League (QMJHL) entry draft.

After appearing in a career high 52 games with the Armada during his second QMJHL season in 2014–15, Montembeault was selected by the Florida Panthers in the third round (77th overall) of the 2015 NHL entry draft.

In the following QMJHL season, he recorded a 17–19–8 record with a 2.63 goals against average (GAA), .901 save percentage, along with three shutouts. Leading the Armada into the postseason, Montembeault was named the Vaughn Canadian Hockey League Goaltender of the Week in early April after earning a 3–1 record, 2.27 GAA and .933 save percentage during Blainville's first round playoff series win against the Val-d'Or Foreurs. Collectively, Montembeault finished the postseason with a 2.45 GAA, .925 save percentage and one shutout. He was also selected to represent in both the CHL/NHL Top Prospects Game and CHL Canada/Russia Series.

On May 10, 2016, Montembeault was signed to a three-year, entry-level contract with the Florida Panthers. He subsequently returned for his final season of major junior with the Armada, establishing new career highs with both a 2.40 GAA and a .907 save percentage in 2016–17, and earned the QMJHL Second All-Star Team honours.

=== Professional ===
==== Florida Panthers ====
Montembeault first attended the Panthers' training camp in 2017, before reassignment to the American Hockey League (AHL) with affiliate, the Springfield Thunderbirds. On October 13, 2017, he made 25 saves in a 3–2 defeat to the Providence Bruins, being his professional debut for the Thunderbirds. Montembeault collected his first win in his seventh outing, backstopping the Thunderbirds in a 5–3 decision over the Hartford Wolf Pack on November 3, 2017. With Springfield finishing well out of Calder Cup playoff contention, Montembeault compiled a total of 13 wins through 41 games during the 2017–18 season.

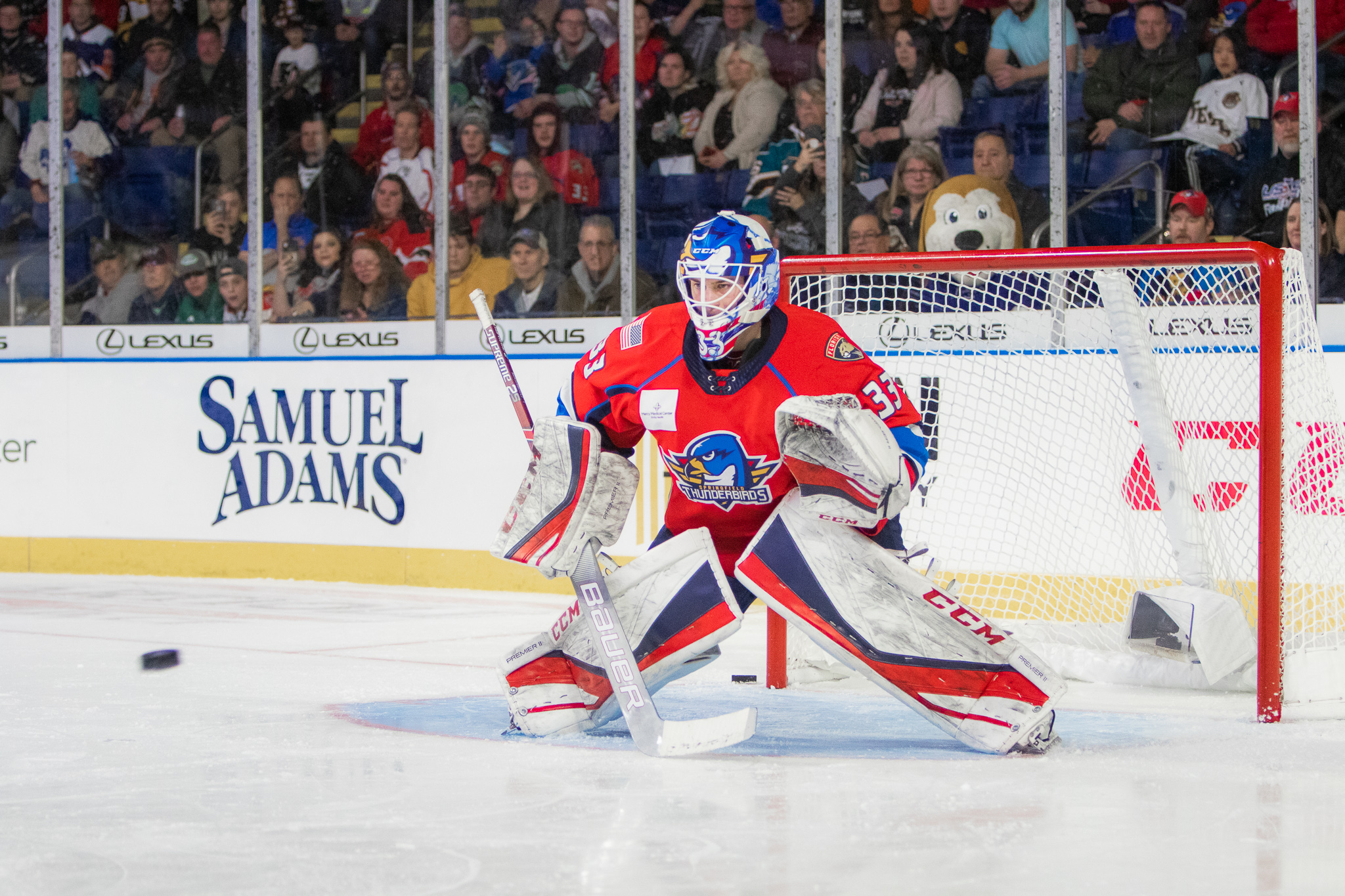
Montembeault with the Thunderbirds in 2019

Montembeault was again re-assigned to continue in the AHL with Springfield to begin the 2018–19 season. He was selected to represent the 2019 AHL All-Star Classic. After 33 games with the Thunderbirds, having already matched his previous win totals, Montembeault received his first recall by the Panthers due to starting goaltender Roberto Luongo briefly leaving the team on bereavement in February 2019. In his second recall to the Panthers following an injury to backup James Reimer, Montembeault made his NHL debut in a 4–3 overtime defeat to the Carolina Hurricanes at the BB&T Center in Sunrise, Florida on March 2, 2019. He made another start against the Minnesota Wild the following week, giving up two goals in a 6–2 win. In his first five starts, Montembeault posted a 4–0–1 record. After making 35 saves in a 2–1 shootout loss to the New York Islanders, he was reassigned to the AHL ranks. He finished the season playing 11 games, with a record of 4–3–2, a 3.04 GAA and a .894 save percentage. His conclusion to the season was considered "very successful," with then-general manager Dale Tallon noting significant development in his play. Thereafter, Montembeault was re-signed to a one-year, two-way contract by the Panthers, on July 19.

Making his first start of the 2019–20 season on October 12, 2019, a 3–2 shootout loss against the New York Islanders, Montembeault posted a 1–0–1 record before allowing five goals in each of his next three starts. On November 12, he replaced Sergei Bobrovsky after the foregoing was pulled, allowing four goals on 23 shots against the Boston Bruins. Montembeault stopped all shots he faced and the team rallied back to win 5–4 in a shootout. However, after giving up five goals against the Buffalo Sabres in a 5–2 loss on November 24, he was returned to Springfield. Once again recalled by the Panthers in January 2020 to serve as a backup to Chris Driedger after Bobrovsky sustained an injury during a team practice, he concluded the season with a 5–5–1 record, a 3.34 GAA and a .890 save percentage.

Not making a single appearance for the Panthers over the course of the pandemic shortened 2020–21 season, Montembeault instead played for temporary AHL affiliate, the Syracuse Crunch. In 25 games with the Panthers, he posted a 9–8–3 record, a goals against average of 3.20 and a .892 save percentage.

==== Montreal Canadiens ====
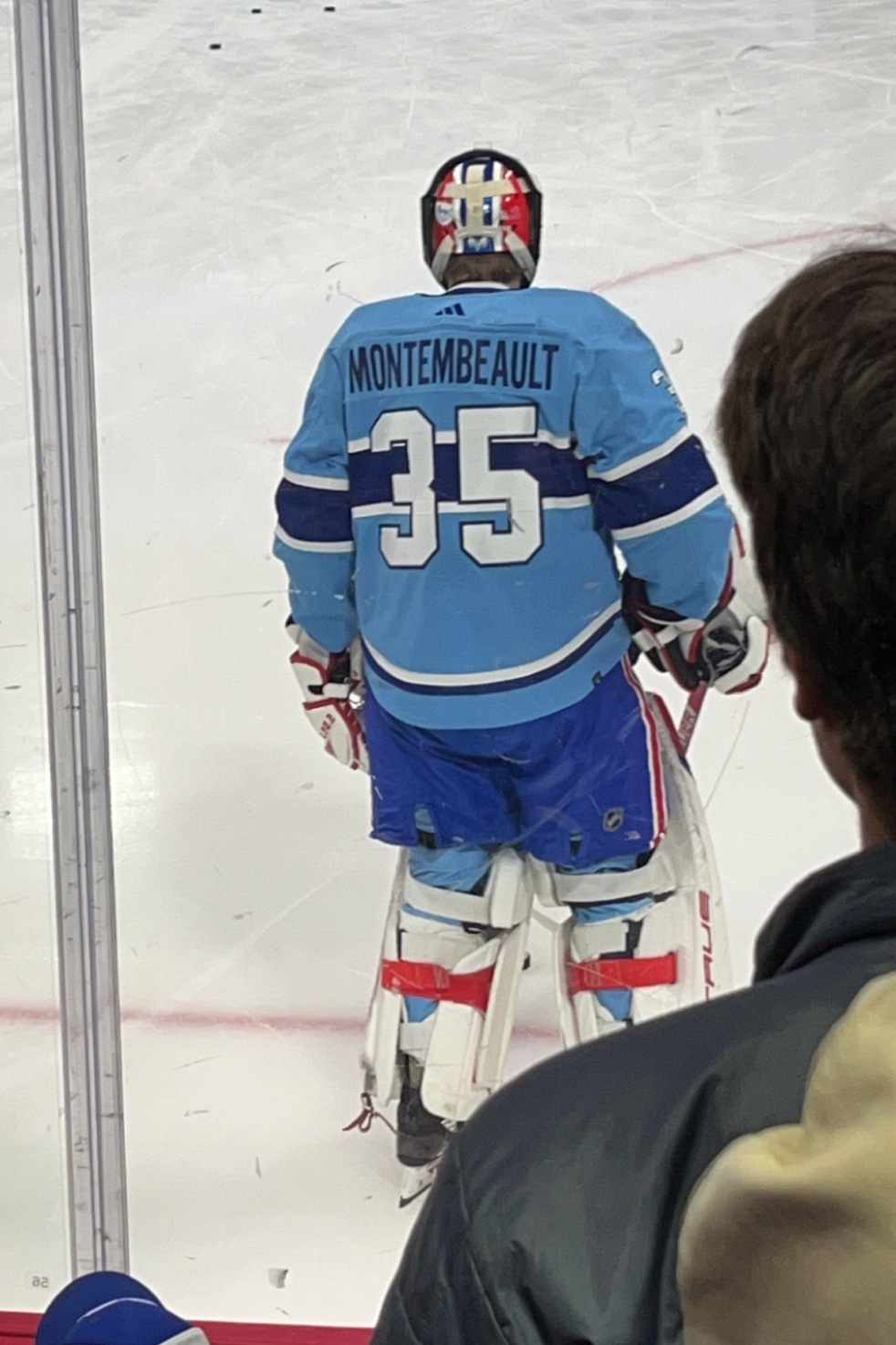
Montembeault with the Montreal Canadiens in January 2023

Prior to the beginning of the 2021–22 season, Montembeault was placed on waivers by the Panthers on October 1, 2021, and was subsequently claimed by the Montreal Canadiens. He made his Canadiens debut a few days later in a 6–2 preseason loss against the Toronto Maple Leafs, but was widely credited for a strong performance despite weak defending by the team. With starting goaltender Carey Price taking a leave of absence for mental health reasons, Montembeault became the primary backup goaltender to veteran Jake Allen. Following an injury to Allen on January 12 in a game against the Boston Bruins, Montembeault became the Canadiens' starting goaltender for a period of two months. Over the course of this run, he became the first goaltender in team history to post 48+ saves in two consecutives games and earned his first career NHL shutout win against the Buffalo Sabres on February 23. Upon Allen's return, Montembeault initially played only sparingly. However, after Allen was re-injured in early April, he again became the team's starting goaltender. Collectively, he finished the season posting an 8–18–6 record, along with a 3.77 GAA, .891 save percentage, and one shutout. During the ensuing offseason, Montembeault underwent corrective wrist surgery, and was likewise re-signed to a two-year, $2 million contract extension by the Canadiens.

Beginning the 2022–23 season as Allen's backup, he was soon noted for markedly improved performance, particularly when evaluated by advanced statistics. After yet another injury to Allen in January 2023 necessitated Montembeault taking over the starter role, he appeared in eight straight games, posting a 4–4–0 record with a .930 save percentage during that span. Kent Hughes, the team's general manager, praised his play, stating, "he still has a lot to experience as a goalie, but we see the potential. So Sam definitely isn't going anywhere." Discussion then ensued amongst sports media of whether Montembeault should be treated as the team's main goaltender on a long-term basis. Upon Allen's return, the two largely alternated starts on an equal basis. Following the season, Montembeault finished second to captain Nick Suzuki for the Molson Cup honour as team player of the year.

With prospect goaltender Cayden Primeau no longer exempt from waivers entering the 2023–24 season, the Canadiens began play with a rotation of three goaltenders that included Primeau alongside Montembeault and Allen. Montembeault appeared in ten games in the first two months of the season, going 5–3–1 and recording a .910 save percentage, before it was announced on December 1 that he had been re-signed to a three-year, $9.45 million contract. On January 6, Montembeault made 45 saves in a 4–3 shootout win against the New York Rangers, including two key saves; one against Mika Zibanejad and another against Alexis Lafrenière to secure the victory. He ultimately appeared in 41 games, a new career high, with a 16–15–9 record and a .903 save percentage.

Heading into the 2024–25 season, Montembeault established himself as the team's starting goaltender, and had a 48-save shutout victory in the Canadiens' home opener against the Maple Leafs, setting an NHL record for the most saves in a season-opening shutout. He earned another shutout against the Edmonton Oilers on November 18, stopping 30 shots. He registered his third shutout on December 5, against the Nashville Predators, tying with Connor Hellebuyck of the Winnipeg Jets for most NHL shutouts of the season at that time. Thereafter, he would register his 17th win of the campaign on January 21, establishing a new career best over the course of a full season. However, prior to the 4 Nations Face-Off break, Montembeault lost four of his five starts, recording a 3.25 GAA and a .883 save percentage during that stretch. He bounced back after the break, securing his fourth shutout of the season against the Carolina Hurricanes on February 25, making 20 saves. Montembeault continued to carry the workload, making consecutive starts down the stretch, as the team pushed to clinch a playoff berth. On April 8, he made 35 saves on 36 shots in a win against the Detroit Red Wings, a crucial victory as the team built an eight-point cushion in the wild card race. On April 16, the Canadiens officially qualified for the Stanley Cup playoffs, with Montembeault making 27 saves in a 4–2 victory against the Hurricanes. With a 31–24–7 record over 62 appearances and a .902 save percentage, he was again the team's Molson Cup runner-up behind Suzuki. He also recorded a 24.6 goals saved above expected, placing him fifth league-wide in this statistical category. Montembeault was credited with a key role in the Canadiens qualifying for the Stanley Cup playoffs for the first time in four years. He then started his first NHL playoff game on April 21, making 29 saves in a 3–2 overtime loss to the Washington Capitals. In the third game of the series, with the Canadiens and Capitals tied 2–2, he was forced to exit with an apparent injury, yielding the net to rookie Jakub Dobeš. Capitals starting goaltender Logan Thompson subsequently also departed due to injury, and the Canadiens would ultimately win the game 6–3. Montembeault would be sidelined for the remainder of the series, with later confirmation that he had torn two groin muscles which would not require surgical intervention.

After struggling at the onset of the 2025–26 season, Montembeault was reassigned to the Canadiens' AHL affiliate, the Laval Rocket, for conditioning purposes on December 16. He was recalled to the roster with the resumption of league play after the Christmas holidays, and started his first game in almost a month on December 30, earning an overtime victory against the Panthers. Though he made a 36-save performance against the Winnipeg Jets on February 5, his difficulties continued, and after allowing five goals in an eventual shootout loss to the Anaheim Ducks on March 6, he would not play again for the remainder of the season, with Dobeš and Jacob Fowler serving as the Canadiens' goaltending tandem instead. Montembeault finished the year with a 10–8–4 record and an .872 save percentage. The season was considered a "difficult and disappointing" one for him, as in addition to having lost his position as the team's starting goaltender, he had at the start of the season been under consideration for a spot on the men's national team for the 2026 Winter Olympics. Reflecting on his poor performance, he admitted he "put too much pressure" on himself at the start of season.

In advance of the 2026–27 season, Canadiens general manager Kent Hughes stated that the team would not begin the season with three goaltenders on the roster, in what was widely considered a contest between Montembeault and Fowler for the backup role behind Dobeš. Montembeault was widely credited with a strong performance in preseason competition, stopping 34 of 35 shots across two half-games played, and on September 27 it was announced that he would remain on the NHL roster whilst Fowler was sent down to Laval. Montembeault was scheduled to make his first start of the season against the Nashville Predators on October 8, but injured himself in practice the day beforehand, and on October 9 the team announced he would miss 10 to 14 days while recuperating.

== Personal life ==
As a youth, Montembeault was an avid fan of the Boston Red Sox and himself played baseball, primarily in the catcher position. He has one sibling, his brother Matthieu.

Montembeault met his wife, fellow Québécoise Daryanne Ayotte, while playing for the QMJHL's Blainville-Boisbriand Armada in 2017. The couple were engaged in September 2024 and married at the Four Seasons Hotel in Montreal eleven months later.

== International play ==
Medal record

Men's ice hockey

Representing Canada

4 Nations Face-Off
Gold medal – first place	2025 Canada/United States	

World Championships
Gold medal – first place	2023 Finland/Latvia	

Internationally, Montembeault first represented Team Canada at the 2016 World Junior Ice Hockey Championships, however, as the team's third goaltender, did not see any tournament play.

Following the Montreal Canadiens not qualifying for the 2023 Stanley Cup playoffs, Montembeault accepted an invitation to join the Canadian national senior team for the ensuing IIHF World Championships. In his first international appearance, he recorded a shutout victory over Latvia. Ultimately starting seven of his country's ten games, including all in the knockout rounds, Montembeault posted a 1.42 GAA and a .939 save percentage en route to Canada winning the championship final.

In December 2024, Montembeault was named as one of three goaltenders, alongside Jordan Binnington and Adin Hill, to the Canadian roster for the NHL-sanctioned 4 Nations Face-Off held in the midst of the 2024–25 campaign. Assuming the role as Canada's third goaltender, he ultimately did not see any game action throughout, but nonetheless won a gold medal following their overtime defeat of archrivals the United States on February 20, 2025 in the tournament final.

== Goaltending style ==
Montembeault is a hybrid style goaltender, who uses his size to cover the net and challenge shooters. During his time in the 4 Nations Face-Off, he enhanced his ability to stop shots by understanding the speed of execution from shooters.

Montembeault also has the visual ability to know the shooting handedness of the opposing player, memorizing the color of the tape job on each of their sticks.

== Career statistics ==
=== Regular season and playoffs ===
			Regular season									Playoffs
Season	Team	League	GP	W	L	OT	MIN	GA	SO	GAA	SV%	GP	W	L	MIN	GA	SO	GAA	SV%
2011–12	Trois-Rivières Estacades	QMAAA	1	0	0	0	1	0	0	0.00	1.000	—	—	—	—	—	—	—	—
2012–13	Trois-Rivières Estacades	QMAAA	19	11	7	1	1110	47	1	2.54	.915	6	4	1	365	17	0	2.79	.915
2013–14	Blainville-Boisbriand Armada	QMJHL	14	9	1	1	714	28	0	2.35	.898	1	1	0	53	3	0	3.40	.824
2014–15	Blainville-Boisbriand Armada	QMJHL	52	33	11	7	3104	134	3	2.59	.891	6	2	4	353	14	0	2.38	.878
2015–16	Blainville-Boisbriand Armada	QMJHL	47	17	19	8	2711	119	3	2.63	.901	11	5	5	685	28	1	2.45	.925
2016–17	Blainville-Boisbriand Armada	QMJHL	41	28	9	1	2226	89	6	2.40	.907	18	12	6	1070	42	0	2.35	.910
2017–18	Springfield Thunderbirds	AHL	41	13	23	3	2196	119	2	3.25	.896	—	—	—	—	—	—	—	—
2018–19	Springfield Thunderbirds	AHL	39	13	16	8	2188	118	1	3.24	.899	—	—	—	—	—	—	—	—
2018–19	Florida Panthers	NHL	11	4	3	2	592	30	0	3.05	.894	—	—	—	—	—	—	—	—
2019–20	Florida Panthers	NHL	14	5	5	1	701	39	0	3.34	.890	—	—	—	—	—	—	—	—
2019–20	Springfield Thunderbirds	AHL	11	5	5	1	659	33	1	3.00	.918	—	—	—	—	—	—	—	—
2020–21	Syracuse Crunch	AHL	13	8	4	1	775	37	1	2.86	.898	—	—	—	—	—	—	—	—
2021–22	Montreal Canadiens	NHL	38	8	18	6	1943	122	1	3.77	.891	—	—	—	—	—	—	—	—
2022–23	Montreal Canadiens	NHL	40	16	19	3	2334	133	0	3.42	.901	—	—	—	—	—	—	—	—
2023–24	Montreal Canadiens	NHL	41	16	15	9	2429	127	0	3.14	.903	—	—	—	—	—	—	—	—
2024–25	Montreal Canadiens	NHL	62	31	24	7	3534	166	4	2.82	.902	3	0	2	152	7	0	2.76	.908
2025–26	Montreal Canadiens	NHL	25	10	8	4	1419	81	0	3.44	.872	—	—	—	—	—	—	—	—
NHL totals			231	90	92	32	12,951	698	5	3.23	.896	3	0	2	152	7	0	2.76	.908

=== International ===
Year	Team	Event	Result	GP	W	L	OT	MIN	GA	SO	GAA	SV%
2016	Canada	WJC	6th	DNP
2023	Canada	WC	1st place, gold medalist(s)	7	6	1	0	423	10	1	1.42	.939
2025	Canada	4NF	1st place, gold medalist(s)	DNP
Senior totals				7	6	1	0	423	10	1	1.42	—

== Awards and honours ==
Award	Year	Ref
QMAAA
Second All-Star Team	2013	
Best Goalie Prospect	2013	
CHL
CHL/NHL Top Prospects Game	2015	
CHL Canada/Russia Series	2015	
QMJHL
Second All-Star Team	2017	
AHL
All-Star Game	2019	
