= Daniel Fischbuch =

German professional ice hockey player

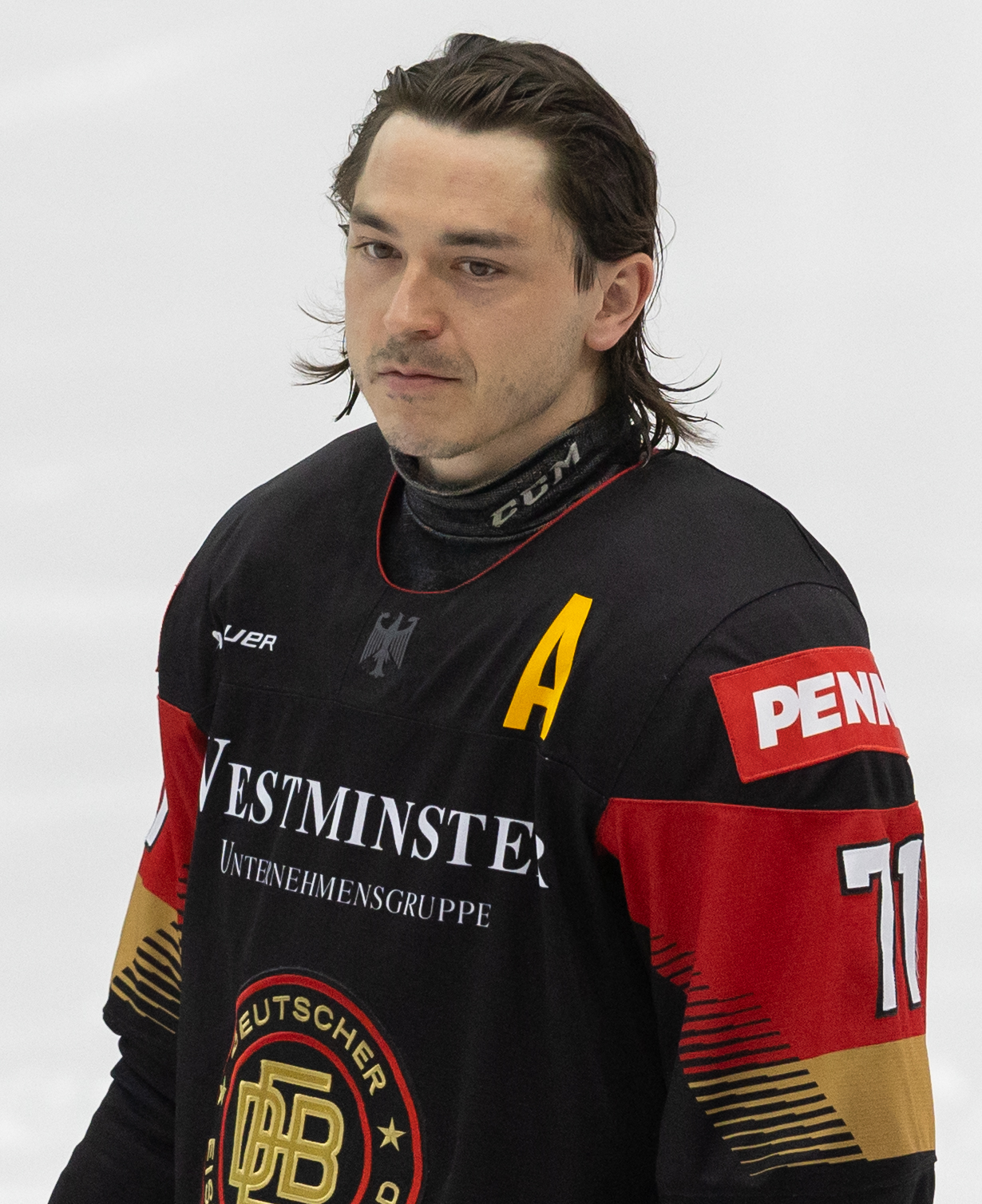
- Daniel Fischbuch, 2026
- Born: 19 August 1993 (age 32) Bad Friedrichshall, Germany
- Height: 6 ft 0 in (183 cm)
- Weight: 176 lb (80 kg; 12 st 8 lb)
- Position: Forward
- Shoots: Right
- DEL team Former teams: Adler Mannheim; Düsseldorfer EG; Eisbären Berlin; Thomas Sabo Ice Tigers
- National team: Germany
- Playing career: 2011–present

Daniel Fischbuch (born 19 August 1993) is a German professional ice hockey player who is a forward for Adler Mannheim of the Deutsche Eishockey Liga (DEL).

== Playing career ==
Born in Bad Friedrichshall, Fischbach played in the youth ranks of Heilbronn, Bietigheim, Mannheim und Bad Nauheim before joining the youth team of Düsseldorfer EG in 2009. He made his debut for Düsseldorf in Germany's top flight Deutsche Eishockey Liga (DEL) during the 2011–12 season. Over the years, he established himself as a vital member of the Düsseldorf team.

In April 2016, he penned a deal with fellow DEL outfit Eisbären Berlin. Fischbuch later returned for a second stint with original club, Düsseldorfer EG for three seasons through to the 2022–23 season.

On 18 April 2023, Fischbuch left Düsseldorf to sign a two-year contract with Adler Mannheim.

Medal record

Representing Germany

Ice hockey

World Championships
Silver medal – second place	2023 Finland/Latvia	

== Career statistics ==
=== International ===
Year	Team	Event	Result	GP	G	A	Pts	PIM
2011	Germany	U18	6th	6	2	1	3	6
2021	Germany	WC	4th	1	0	0	0	0
2022	Germany	WC	7th	8	4	1	5	2
2023	Germany	WC	2nd place, silver medalist(s)	6	2	2	4	2
2024	Germany	WC	6th	4	0	0	0	2
2026	Germany	WC	10th	4	0	0	0	2
Junior totals				6	2	1	3	6
Senior totals				23	6	3	9	8
