= Marco Miranda =

Swiss ice hockey player (born 1998)

- Born: 2 June 1998 (age 27) Zürich, Switzerland
- Height: 6 ft 2 in (188 cm)
- Weight: 200 lb (91 kg; 14 st 4 lb)
- Position: Left wing
- Shoots: Left
- NL team Former teams: Genève-Servette HC; ZSC Lions
- National team: Switzerland
- Playing career: 2015–present

Marco Miranda (born 2 June 1998) is a Swiss professional ice hockey left winger who is currently playing with Genève-Servette HC of the National League (NL). He previously played for the GCK Lions and the ZSC Lions.

== Playing career ==
Miranda made his professional debut with the GCK Lions of the Swiss League (SL) in the 2015-16 season, appearing in 36 SL games this season. He made his National League (NL) debut in the 2017-18 season with the ZSC Lions, playing 12 games and scoring one goal. Miranda also played the 2015 playoffs with Zürich's junior team in the Elite Junior A, scoring 7 points in 8 games and helped the team win the championship.

Miranda eventually played 62 NL games (11 points) with Zürich and 102 SL games (50 points) with their affiliate before signing a three-year contract with an option for a fourth season with Genève-Servette HC on 3 December 2018. The contract runs from the 2019/20 season through the 2021/22 season.

In December 2019, Miranda was loaned to HC Ambrì-Piotta for the 2019 Spengler Cup. He recorded 1 assist in 3 games as Ambri-Piotta fell to Ocelari Trinec in the semi-finals.

Miranda left the first game of the 2020-21 season early in the third period after a knee-on-knee collision with HC Davos' Sven Jung. He underwent medical exams the next day and was forced to sit out the first two months of the season.

On 17 February 2022, Miranda agreed to a two-year contract extension with Servette to remain at the club through the 2023/24 season.

== International play ==
Miranda made his debut with Switzerland men's team in 2018.
