= Sammy Blais =

Canadian ice hockey player (born 1996)

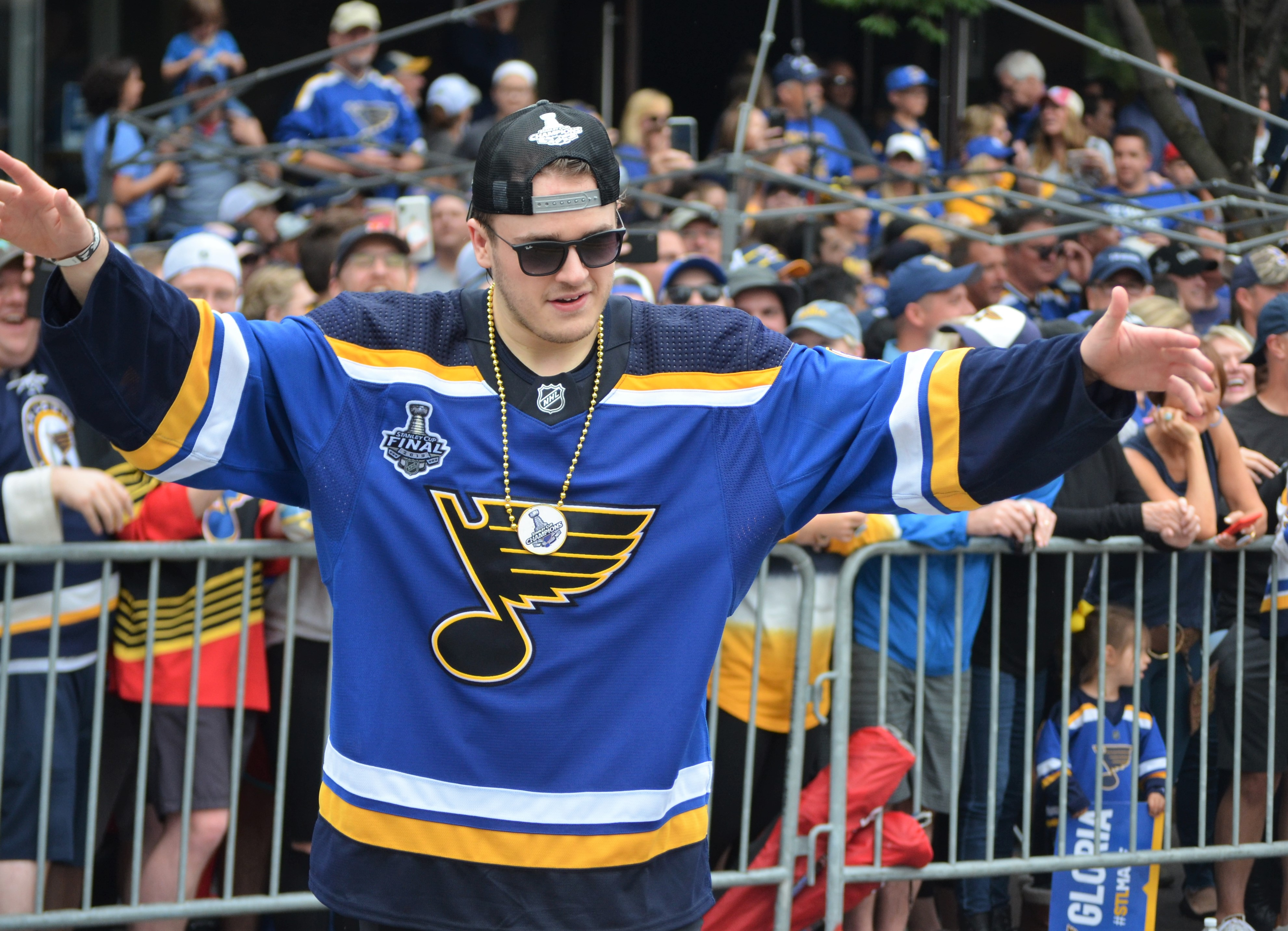
- Blais with the St. Louis Blues in 2019
- Born: June 17, 1996 (age 30) Montmagny, Quebec, Canada
- Height: 6 ft 2 in (188 cm)
- Weight: 205 lb (93 kg; 14 st 9 lb)
- Position: Winger
- Shoots: Left
- NHL team (P) Cur. team Former teams: Ottawa Senators; Belleville Senators (AHL); St. Louis Blues; New York Rangers; Toronto Maple Leafs; Montreal Canadiens
- National team: Canada
- NHL draft: 176th overall, 2014; St. Louis Blues
- Playing career: 2016–present

Samuel Blais (born June 17, 1996) is a Canadian professional ice hockey player who is a winger for the Belleville Senators of the American Hockey League while under contract to the Ottawa Senators of the National Hockey League (NHL). He was selected in the sixth round, 176th overall, by the St. Louis Blues in the 2014 NHL entry draft. Blais has also previously played for the New York Rangers, Toronto Maple Leafs, and Montreal Canadiens.

He played junior ice hockey with Trois-Rivières Estacades and Lévis Commandeurs in the Quebec Junior AAA Hockey League (QMAAA) before entering the Quebec Major Junior Hockey League (QMJHL). He split his time between the Commandeurs and the Victoriaville Tigres before being selected 176th overall by the St. Louis Blues in the 2014 NHL entry draft. Blais spent three seasons in the QMJHL, the latter portion with the Charlottetown Islanders, before making his professional debut with the Chicago Wolves during the 2016–17 season.

Carrying his scoring touch from juniors, Blais helped the Wolves reach the postseason in his rookie year before eventually making his NHL debut on October 14, 2017. During his early years with the Blues organization, Blais alternated between the San Antonio Rampage and St. Louis consistently, resulting in hockey pundits jokingly referring to the highway between the two cities as the Sammy Blais Expressway. As a member of the Blues, Blais helped the team capture their first Stanley Cup in franchise history in 2019.

== Early life ==
Blais was born on June 17, 1996, in Montmagny, Quebec to parents Sébastien and Marie-Josée and siblings Étienne and Florence. His older brother Étienne also plays hockey and last played for the Montmagny Décor Mercier in the Ligue Hockey Côte-Sud. Growing up, he played summer hockey with future NHL player Daniel Sprong until they were 10 or 11 years old.

== Playing career ==
=== Junior ===
Blais began his junior ice hockey career playing with the Rive-Sud Express in Quebec, where he recorded 10 goals with 16 assists in 23 regular season games. He played in the 2008 and 2009 Quebec International Pee-Wee Hockey Tournaments with the Rive-Sud Est and later Rimouski. During the summer of 2012, Blais attended the Lévis Commandeurs training camp but failed to make the jump to AAA midget. As this was his second time failing to make the final roster, Blais stated he "thought it was the end of my hockey career." Instead, he caught the attention of general manager Frédéric Lavoie of Trois-Rivières Estacades who, after listening to praise from his assistant Pascal Luneau and scout Jean-Philippe Glaude, signed him to their team. Blais competed with the Trois-Rivieres during the 2012–13 season, where he recorded 16 goals and 24 assists to help them qualify for the Quebec Junior AAA Hockey League (QMAA) playoffs.

Blais was originally selected 129th overall in the 2013 Quebec Major Junior Hockey League Entry Draft by the Victoriaville Tigres but was reassigned to the Commandeurs out of the Tigres' training camp. At the time of his draft selection, Blais stood at 5'9 but was praised for having "undeniable potential for development." After spending the remainder of the 2013–14 season split between the Commandeurs and the Tigres, Blais was chosen in his first year of eligibility by the St. Louis Blues in the sixth round, 176th overall, of the 2014 NHL entry draft. Blais was unaware he had been drafted and only learned through Twitter. He impressed the coaches during the Blues' Development Camp during the summer and earned an invitation to their training camp in September.

Blais rejoined the Tigres for the 2014–15 season where he posted a career high 82 points in 61 games. After losing in the playoffs, Blais signed an Amateur Tryout Agreement (ATO) with the St. Louis Blues' American Hockey League (AHL) affiliate, Chicago Wolves, on April 22, 2015. He was eventually released from his contract, and attended the Blues' Prospect Camp in July. He rejoined the Tigres for his final junior season where he led the team in scoring. By November 14, 2015, Blais was signed to a three-year entry-level contract with the St. Louis Blues. He produced 40 points in 30 games before he was dealt by the Tigres to the Charlottetown Islanders on December 20, 2015.

Upon his arrival with the Islanders, Blais continued his scoring prowess and spent time on their penalty kill. Blais continued his offensive output in leading the Islanders to finish with a combined 82 points in just 63 games. His scoring helped lead the Islanders to the QMJHL Quarter-finals against the Shawinigan Cataractes, where they lost in six games. At the conclusion of the season, Blais was nominated for the teams' Offensive Player of the Year Award and Three Stars Award. When reflecting on his years playing junior hockey, Blais has stated "I was not really a physical player....But when I came into pro hockey, ‘Chief’ (Berube) told me I was a big guy, I could use my shoulders more. I started doing it, and I think it was another aspect to my game. When I started using it, I became a better player. I think that's why I'm in the NHL today."

=== Professional ===
==== St. Louis Blues ====
Embarking on his professional career, Blais was assigned by St. Louis Blues to American Hockey League (AHL) affiliate Chicago Wolves, for the 2016–17 season. He recorded two shots on goal during his AHL debut on October 14, 2016, against Grand Rapids Griffins and consistently played on a line with Magnus Pääjärvi and Wade Megan. While with this pairing, he recorded his first professional goal on November 5, in a 4–2 win over the Griffins. Blais carried over his scoring ability from junior to lead the Wolves in scoring with 26 goals in 75 games. He helped the team qualify for the 2017 Calder Cup playoffs, where they lost in five games to the Griffins in the Central Division Finals.

After attending the Blues training camp the following summer, Blais with a strong showing was potentially earmarked to make NHL roster for the 2017–18 season. He played with the Blues for their preseason games, during which he was hit from behind by Washington Capitals forward Tom Wilson. This resulted in Wilson receiving a five-minute major, a game misconduct, and a hearing with the NHL Department of Player Safety. However, he was among the Blues final cuts and was reassigned to open the season with the San Antonio Rampage of the AHL. After playing in two games with the Rampage, Blais received his first call-up to the NHL, forcing him to travel cross-country and arrive in Tampa Bay. He made his NHL debut that night on October 14, 2017, in a 2–1 defeat to Tampa Bay Lightning and recorded his first career NHL goal on November 26, to help the Blues win 6–3 over Minnesota Wild. While playing with the Blues on December 16, against Winnipeg Jets, he suffered a lower body injury and missed two weeks to recover. Upon his return to the lineup on January 5, he was reassigned to the Rampage. He played in the AHL alongside Tage Thompson and Zach Sanford before being recalled for the fifth time to the NHL level on February 19, 2018. Overall, Blais alternated between San Antonio and St. Louis six times throughout the season, resulting in some reporters to joking refer to the highway between the two cities as the Sammy Blais Expressway.

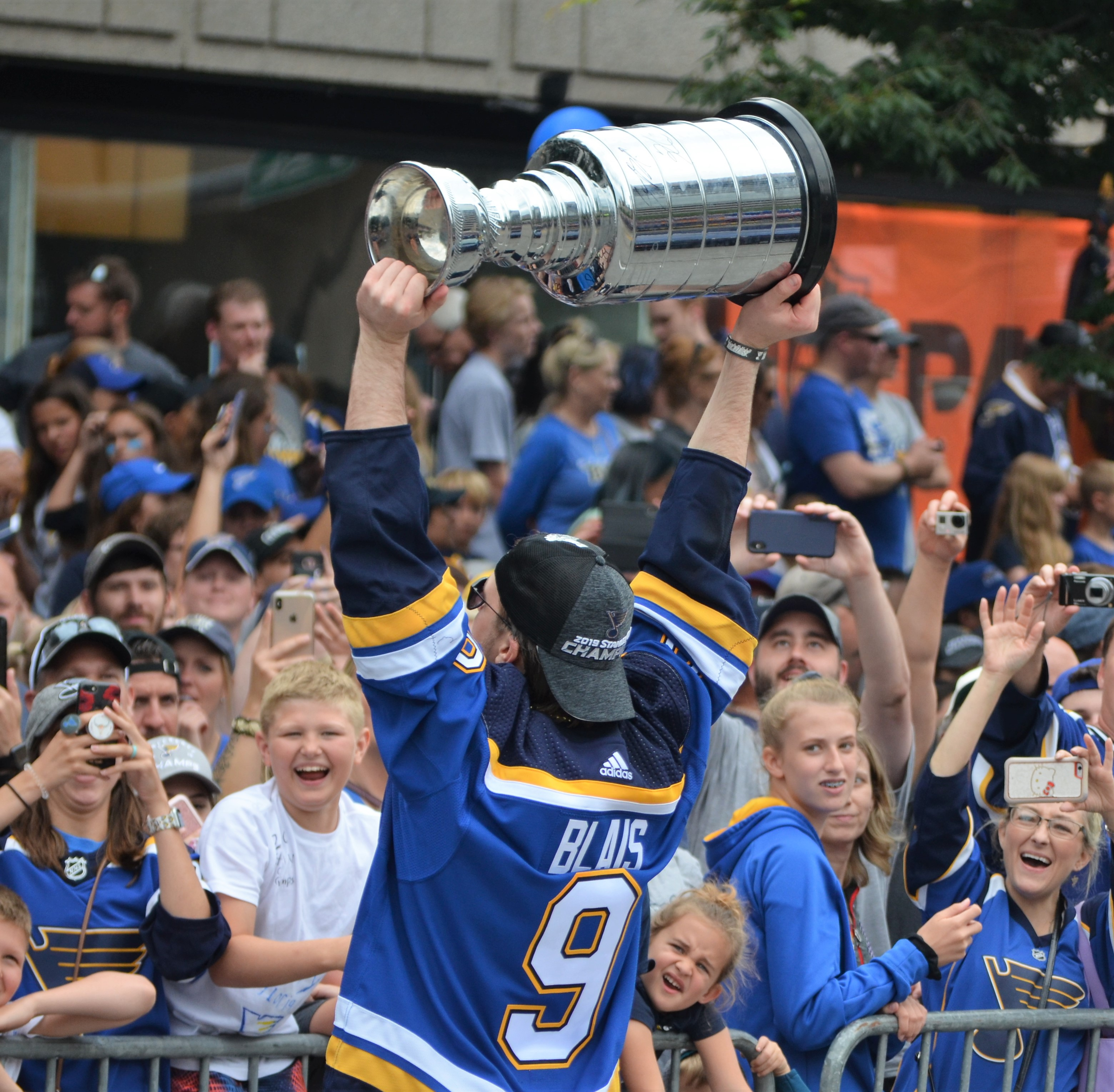
Blais holding a miniature Stanley Cup during the 2019 Stanley Cup parade.

Blais was once again invited to the St. Louis Blues training camp prior to the 2018–19 season, and recorded four goals in four games during their pre-season games. His efforts were noticed and he cracked the Blues' opening night roster against the Winnipeg Jets. His assignment was short-lived as he was reassigned to the Rampage on October 23, 2018, after playing in eight games. He spent nine games at the AHL level, registering two goals and 16 penalty minutes, before earning a recall to the NHL. Once again, Blais spent the season alternating between the AHL and NHL as the Blues qualified for the 2019 Stanley Cup playoffs. Blais made his playoffs debut in game six of the Western Conference second round series and recorded his first NHL playoff goal to push the series to seven games. Blais and the St. Louis Blues eventually won the 2019 Stanley Cup Final against the Boston Bruins, to bring St. Louis their first Stanley Cup in franchise history.

Blais was one of the many members of the Blues' Stanley Cup winning team who returned to their opening night roster for the 2019–20 season. He impressed coach Craig Berube at the beginning of the season and was assigned a top line position alongside David Perron and Ryan O'Reilly. After playing in 20 games and recording eight points, Blais missed ten weeks to recover from wrist surgery as a result of an injury suffered during a 3–1 win over Tampa Bay Lightning. He returned to the Blues lineup on January 28, 2020, for a game against the Calgary Flames, after missing 28 games. While the NHL was suspended due to COVID-19, he signed a two-year, $3 million contract extension with the Blues.

When the NHL returned for the 2020–21 season, Blais made the Blues' opening night roster against the Colorado Avalanche. During the first game of the season, Blais illegally checked Devon Toews's head and was subsequently given a two-minute penalty for elbowing. Following the game, Blais was suspended for two games and forfeited $25,862.06 to the Players' Emergency Assistance Fund.

==== New York Rangers ====
On July 23, 2021, Blais was traded, along with a 2022 second-round pick, to New York Rangers in exchange for Pavel Buchnevich. He registered four assists in 14 games before suffering a torn anterior cruciate ligament (ACL) on November 15 against the New Jersey Devils after he was dangerously slew-footed by P. K. Subban. Blais was ruled out for the remainder of the 2021–22 season.

==== Return to St. Louis ====
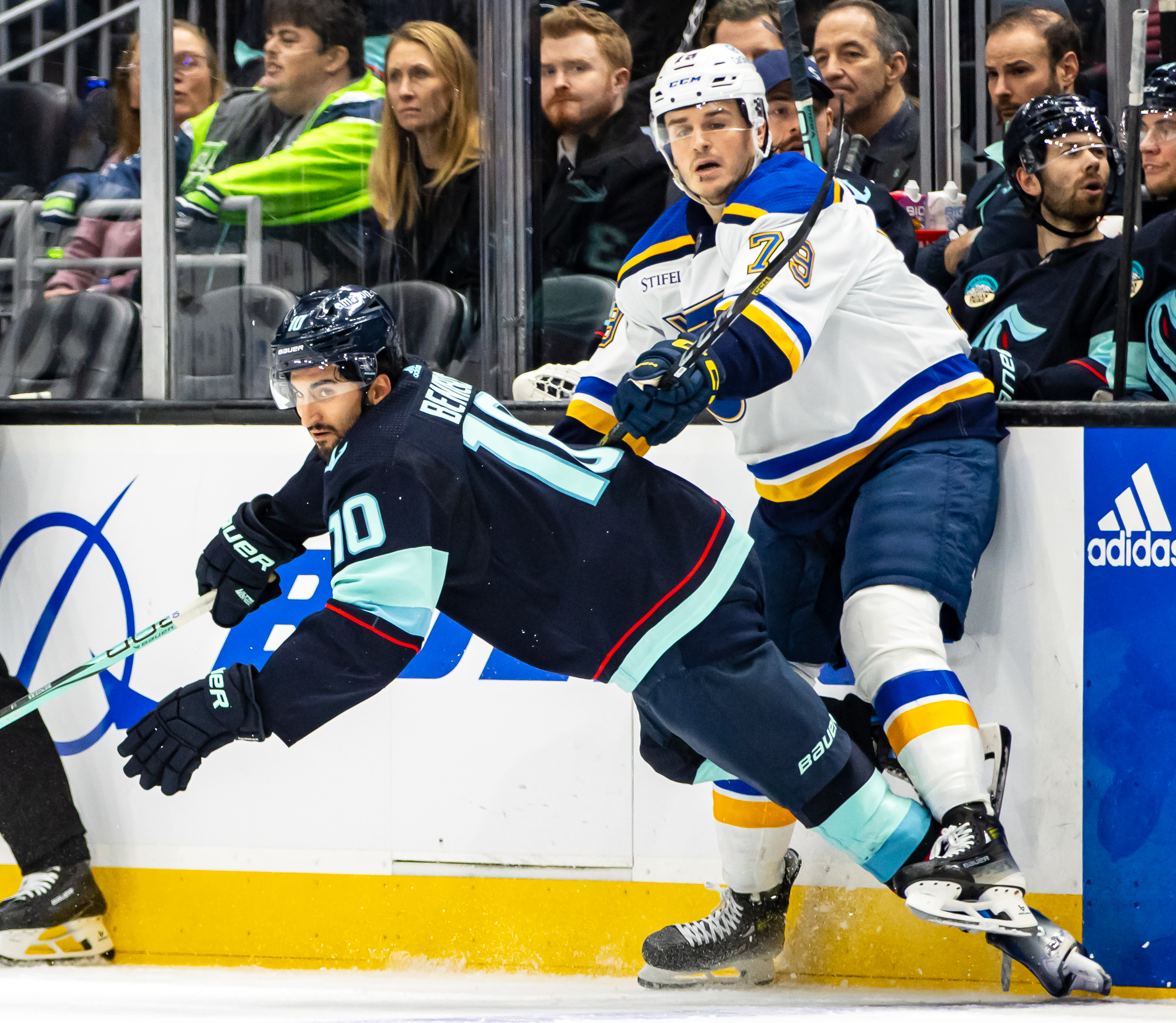
Blais checking Matty Beniers of the Seattle Kraken in 2024.

On February 9, 2023, Blais was traded back to the Blues as part of a package for former teammates Niko Mikkola and Vladimir Tarasenko. On March 2, Blais was signed to a one-year contract extension.

==== Abbotsford Canucks ====
At the conclusion of his contract with St. Louis Blues, Blais ended his second tenure with the club by leaving as a free agent. Un-signed over the summer, Blais later agreed to a one-year AHL contract with the Abbotsford Canucks on August 22, 2024. He was simultaneously invited to attend its NHL affiliate, Vancouver Canucks, 2024 training camp on a professional tryout (PTO). On September 30, Blais was released from the PTO after failing to make the team in camp. On June 23, 2025, Blais won the Calder Cup as a member of the Abbotsford Canucks.

==== Toronto Maple Leafs ====
Entering the offseason as an unrestricted free agent, Blais agreed to a one-year contract with Montreal Canadiens on July 1, 2025. However, before playing a game for Montreal, Blais was claimed off waivers by Toronto Maple Leafs on October 6, reuniting him with former Blues head coach Craig Berube.

==== Montreal Canadiens ====
After appearing in eight games for the Leafs and recording three points, Blais was again placed on waivers and subsequently claimed by the Canadiens in late November. Due to underlying provisions in the NHL Collective Bargaining Agreement, he immediately joined the team's AHL affiliate Laval Rocket.

==== Ottawa Senators ====
As a free agent from the Canadiens, Blais was signed by Ottawa Senators to a two-year, two-way contract on July 1, 2026. He was placed on waivers by the Senators at the end of training camp and after going unclaimed, was assigned to Ottawa's AHL affiliate, Belleville Senators, to start the 2026–27 season. He was recalled to Ottawa on November 2 and made his Ottawa debut against Buffalo Sabres on November 4, a 2-1 win in Buffalo.

== International play ==
Medal record

Representing Canada

Ice hockey

World Championships
Gold medal – first place	2023 Finland/Latvia	

In May 2023, Blais was named to the Canadian senior national team for the annual IIHF World Championship where he registered six goals and two assists in ten games. During the ensuing tournament final, he scored two goals, including the game-winner, to help his country win a gold medal.

== Career statistics ==
=== Regular season and playoffs ===
			Regular season					Playoffs
Season	Team	League	GP	G	A	Pts	PIM	GP	G	A	Pts	PIM
2012–13	Trois-Rivières Estacades	QMAAA	42	16	24	40	42	10	8	4	12	4
2013–14	Lévis Commandeurs	QMAAA	21	12	23	35	12	—	—	—	—	—
2013–14	Victoriaville Tigres	QMJHL	25	4	10	14	0	4	0	1	1	0
2014–15	Victoriaville Tigres	QMJHL	61	34	48	82	50	4	2	3	5	4
2015–16	Victoriaville Tigres	QMJHL	30	17	23	40	19	—	—	—	—	—
2015–16	Charlottetown Islanders	QMJHL	33	16	26	42	14	12	4	15	19	14
2016–17	Chicago Wolves	AHL	75	26	17	43	58	10	3	5	8	18
2017–18	San Antonio Rampage	AHL	42	17	23	40	38	—	—	—	—	—
2017–18	St. Louis Blues	NHL	11	1	2	3	6	—	—	—	—	—
2018–19	St. Louis Blues	NHL	32	2	2	4	6	15	1	2	3	10
2018–19	San Antonio Rampage	AHL	26	8	10	18	55	—	—	—	—	—
2019–20	St. Louis Blues	NHL	40	6	7	13	20	8	1	3	4	12
2020–21	St. Louis Blues	NHL	36	8	7	15	12	4	1	0	1	4
2021–22	New York Rangers	NHL	14	0	4	4	17	—	—	—	—	—
2022–23	New York Rangers	NHL	40	0	5	5	8	—	—	—	—	—
2022–23	Hartford Wolf Pack	AHL	5	4	0	4	8	—	—	—	—	—
2022–23	St. Louis Blues	NHL	31	9	11	20	22	—	—	—	—	—
2023–24	St. Louis Blues	NHL	53	1	6	7	31	—	—	—	—	—
2024–25	Abbotsford Canucks	AHL	51	14	26	40	44	23	6	13	19	77
2025–26	Toronto Maple Leafs	NHL	8	1	2	3	4	—	—	—	—	—
2025–26	Laval Rocket	AHL	35	14	24	38	62	5	3	2	5	20
2025–26	Montreal Canadiens	NHL	13	2	3	5	6	—	—	—	—	—
NHL totals			278	30	49	79	132	27	3	5	8	26

=== International ===
Year	Team	Event	Result	GP	G	A	Pts	PIM
2023	Canada	WC	1st place, gold medalist(s)	10	6	2	8	6
Senior totals				10	6	2	8	6

== Awards and honours ==
Award	Year	Ref
NHL
Stanley Cup champion	2019	
AHL
Calder Cup champion	2025	
