= Robert Mayer (ice hockey) =

Czech-born Swiss ice hockey player

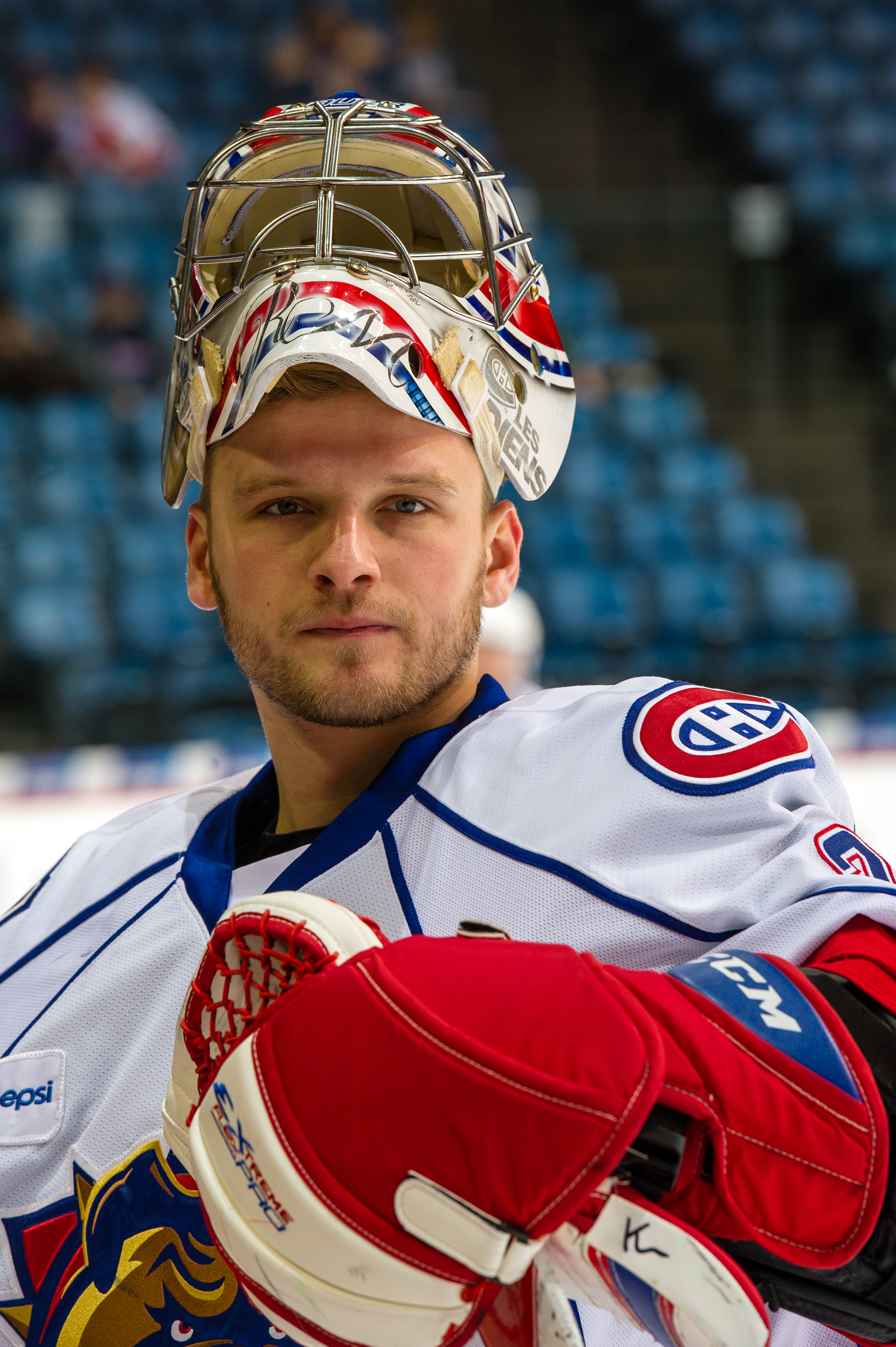
- Mayer with the Hamilton Bulldogs in 2013
- Born: October 9, 1989 (age 36) Havířov, Czechoslovakia
- Height: 6 ft 1 in (185 cm)
- Weight: 197 lb (89 kg; 14 st 1 lb)
- Position: Goaltender
- Shoots: Left
- NL team Former teams: Genève-Servette HC; Kloten Flyers; Hamilton Bulldogs; HC Davos
- National team: Switzerland
- NHL draft: Undrafted
- Playing career: 2009–present

Robert Mayer (born October 9, 1989) is a Czech-born Swiss professional ice hockey goaltender who is currently playing with Genève-Servette HC of the National League (NL). He first played professional with the Kloten Flyers of the NL before signing a three-year entry-level contract with the Montreal Canadiens in 2008.

== Playing career ==
In his five seasons within the Canadiens organization, Mayer played primarily with American Hockey League affiliate the Hamilton Bulldogs. On May 22, 2014, Mayer was placed and cleared unconditional waivers in order to be mutually released from his contract with the Canadiens.

On June 6, 2014, Mayer returned to the NL, signing a three-year contract with Genève-Servette HC.

On June 21, 2017, Mayer was signed to a four-year contract extension by Geneva. Prior to the 2017-18 NL season, Mayer was involved in a quad accident, breaking his ribs and perforating his lungs. Geneva announced that he will be out for an indeterminate period of time, forcing the team to call back Gautier Descloux who was on loan with HC Ambrì-Piotta.

On December 10, 2019, Mayer agreed to a four-year contract with HC Davos, starting from the 2020/21 season and through the 2024/25 season.

== Awards and honours ==
- ECHL Playoff MVP (2009–10)
