= Lawson Crouse =

Canadian ice hockey player (born 1997)

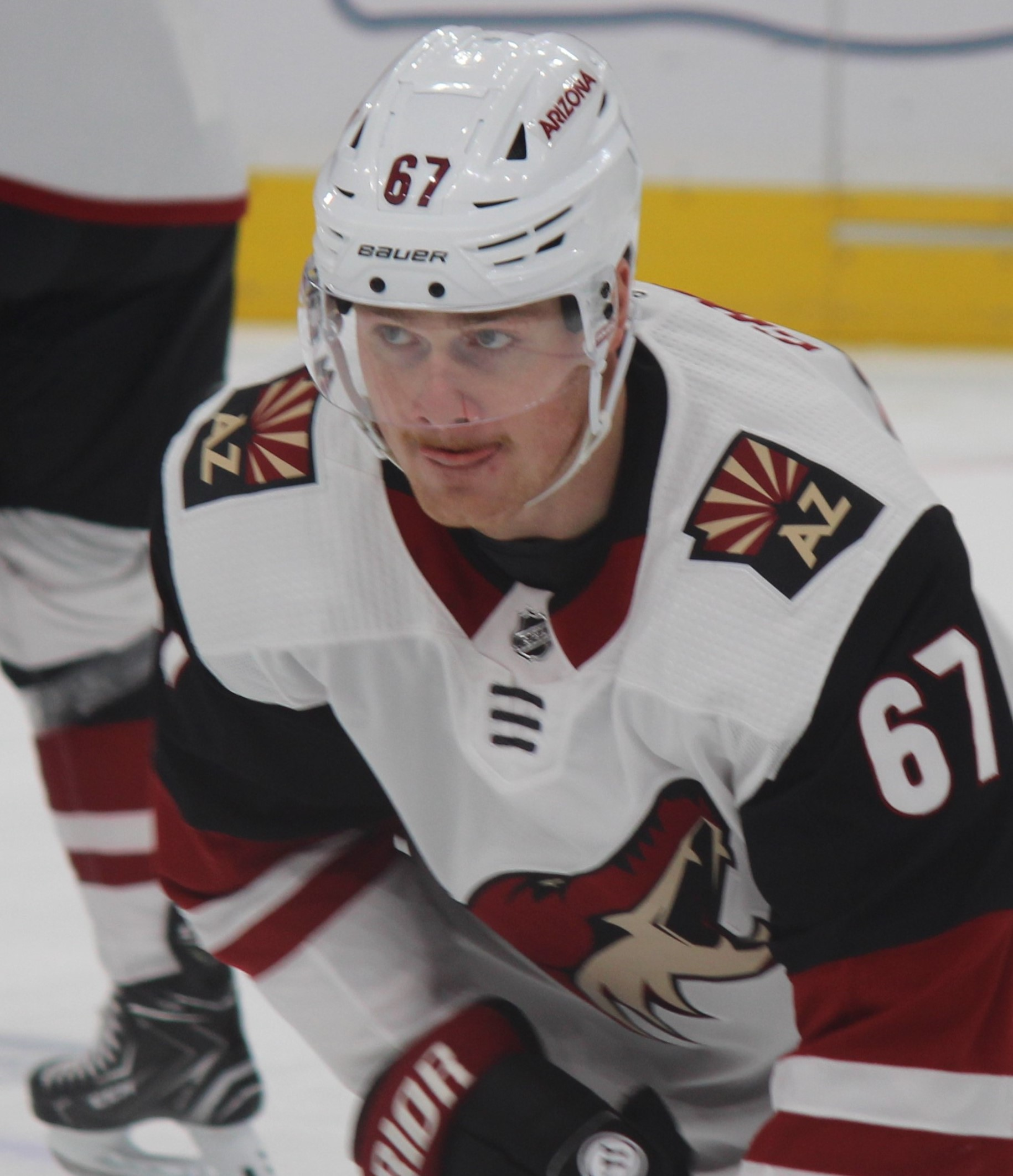
- Crouse with the Arizona Coyotes in 2019
- Born: June 23, 1997 (age 29) Mount Brydges, Ontario, Canada
- Height: 6 ft 4 in (193 cm)
- Weight: 214 lb (97 kg; 15 st 4 lb)
- Position: Winger
- Shoots: Left
- NHL team Former teams: Utah Mammoth; Arizona Coyotes
- National team: Canada
- NHL draft: 11th overall, 2015; Florida Panthers
- Playing career: 2016–present

Lawson Crouse (born June 23, 1997) is a Canadian professional ice hockey player who is a winger and alternate captain for the Utah Mammoth of the National Hockey League (NHL). He was part of the Canadian gold medal-winning team at the 2015 World Junior Ice Hockey Championships. Crouse was drafted in the first round (11th overall) by the Florida Panthers in the 2015 NHL entry draft and was traded to the Arizona Coyotes in August 2016. He is also nicknamed 'The Sheriff' by the team and fans for his tough, physical play.

== Early life ==
Crouse was born on June 23, 1997, in Mount Brydges, Ontario, the youngest child of Mike, a minor ice hockey coach, and Kristen, a school principal. Crouse's grandfather was a devoted professional baseball fan who took his grandson to many Montreal Expos games and trips to other ballparks. While Crouse played some baseball as a first and third baseman, he also played lacrosse and ice hockey, and devoted himself to the last of the three as an adolescent. Crouse met his best friend, future National Hockey League (NHL) player Travis Konecny, while the two were trying out for the same hockey team at the age of six. The pair went on to play on the same offensive line on their minor hockey team, the Elgin-Middlesex Chiefs of the Alliance Hockey organization, with Crouse at centre and Konecny on the wing. Crouse was the third-highest scoring Alliance Hockey skater in the 2012–13 season, with 22 goals and 50 points in 27 regular-season games. He received a four-game suspension during the Alliance Hockey playoffs, but returned to score a hat-trick and two additional assists, helping Elgin-Middlesex to defeat Kitchener 9–3 and send the Chiefs to the finals. The Chiefs swept Waterloo 4–0 in the Alliance championships, and Crouse added another four goals and two assists in five OHL Cup games.

== Playing career ==
=== Junior ===
Crouse was selected by the Kingston Frontenacs of the Ontario Hockey League (OHL) in the first round, fifth overall, in the 2013 OHL Priority Selection. In the 2013–14 season, Crouse appeared in his first career OHL game on September 19, 2013, scoring his first career goal in that game against Andrew D'Agostini in the Frontenacs 11–4 win over the Peterborough Petes. On October 4, 2013, Crouse recorded his first multi-goal game of his junior career, scoring twice in a 7–4 win over the Ottawa 67's. On March 4, 2014, Crouse had a season high four point game, scoring two goals and adding two assists, as Kingston lost to the Barrie Colts 7–5. Overall, Crouse finished the 2013–14 season with 15 goals and 27 points in 63 games, helping the Frontenacs into the playoffs. In seven post-season games, Crouse was limited to one assist, as the Frontenacs were upset by the Peterborough Petes in the first round.

Crouse improved during his second season with the Fronteancs in 2014–15. He recorded his first career OHL hat-trick on November 28, 2014, scoring three goals against goaltender Dawson Carty of the Kitchener Rangers in a 5–0 Frontenacs victory. He played in 56 games with Kingston, scoring 29 goals and 51 points. On March 29, 2015, Crouse scored his first career OHL playoff goal against Jake Smith of the North Bay Battalion in a 3–2 loss. Overall, in four playoff games, Crouse scored two goals and three points, as the Frontenacs were swept by the Battalion in the Eastern Conference quarter-finals.

Crouse returned to the Frontenacs for a third season in 2015–16, and Crouse once again saw an improvement in his offensive numbers. On March 5, he scored a hat-trick (as well as adding one assist) in a 7–2 win over the Flint Firebirds. Overall, in 49 games, he scored 23 goals and 62 points. Crouse opened the post-season with a three-point game, scoring a goal and adding two assists in a 6–0 win over the Oshawa Generals. On March 26, Crouse scored his first multi-goal playoff game, scoring twice against Justin Nichols of the Oshawa Generals in a 7–3 win. In nine post-season games, Crouse scored seven goals and 11 points, as Kingston lost to the Niagara IceDogs in the Eastern Conference semi-finals.

=== Professional ===
Crouse was drafted 11th overall in the 2015 NHL entry draft by the Florida Panthers. On July 15, 2015, the Panthers signed Crouse to a three-year, entry-level contract.

The Panthers assigned Crouse to his junior hockey team, the Kingston Frontenacs, for the 2015–16 season. When the Frontenacs were eliminated from the OHL playoffs, Florida assigned Crouse to their American Hockey League (AHL) affiliate, the Portland Pirates, for the remainder of the season. In his first career AHL game, Crouse was held off the scoresheet in a 3–2 loss to the Springfield Falcons. Overall, he appeared in two games with the Pirates, scoring no points.

==== Arizona Coyotes ====
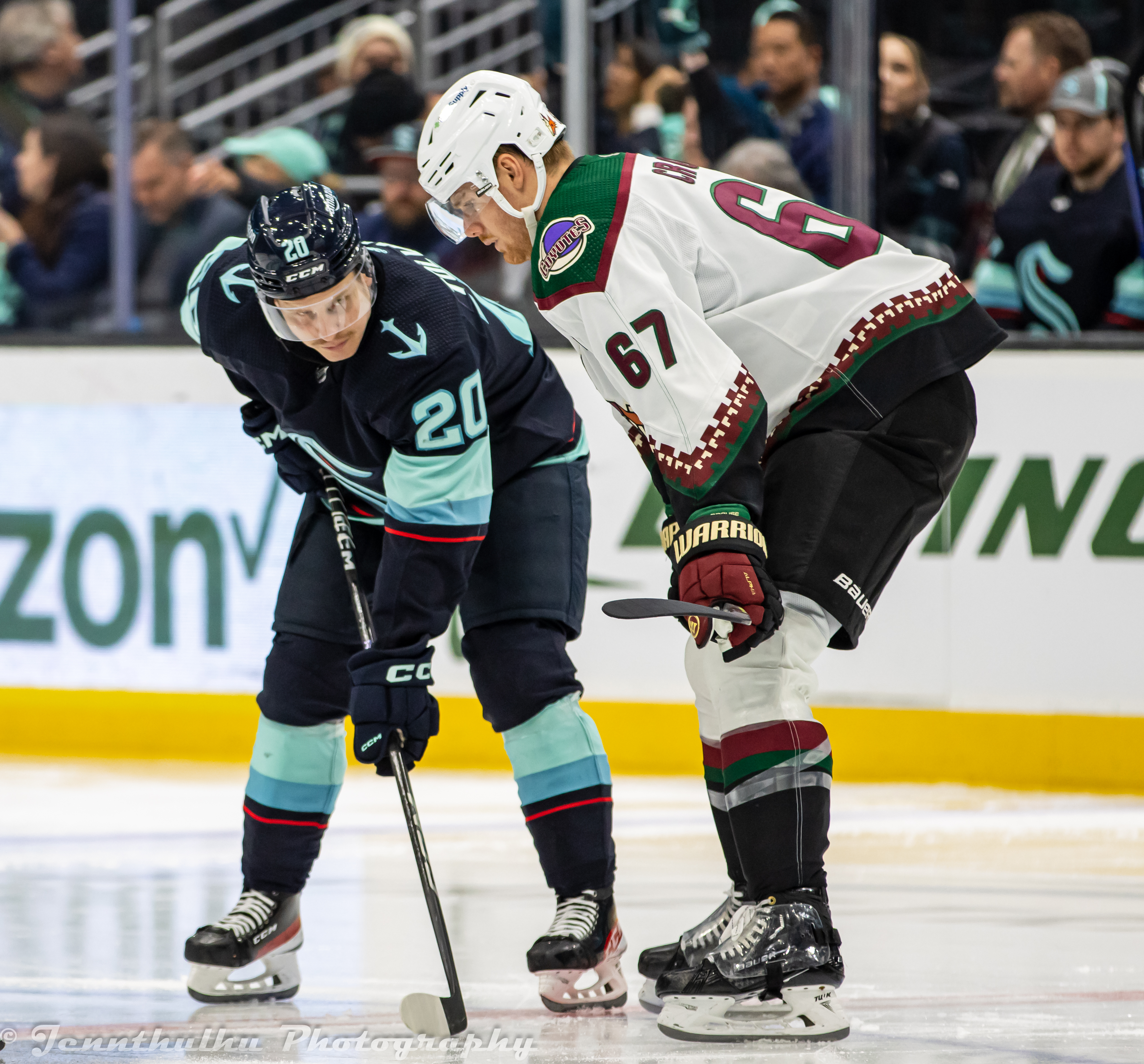
Crouse and Eeli Tolvanen of the Seattle Kraken in 2023.

On August 25, 2016, Crouse was traded (along with Dave Bolland) to the Arizona Coyotes for a conditional second-round pick in 2017 and a third-round pick in 2018. Following an impressive training camp and pre-season, Crouse made the Coyotes regular season roster. On October 15, Crouse made his NHL debut, as he was held off the score sheet in a 4–3 victory over the Philadelphia Flyers. On November 1, Crouse scored his first career NHL goal against Martin Jones of the San Jose Sharks in a 3–2 win. On January 31, Crouse recorded his first career multi-point game, earning two assists in a 3–2 loss to the Los Angeles Kings. Crouse finished his rookie season by appearing in 72 games, scoring 5 goals and 12 points.

Crouse began the 2017–18 season with the Coyotes. However, after struggling during the early part of the season, Crouse was reassigned to the Coyotes' AHL affiliate, the Tucson Roadrunners. In Tucson, Crouse earned an assist in his first game, as the Roadrunners defeated the Iowa Wild 4–1 on October 27. On November 11, Crouse scored his first two goals of the season in a 4–1 win over the Bakersfield Condors. Later in the season, Crouse recorded his first career three point game in the AHL, scoring two goals and an assist in a 5–3 win against the San Diego Gulls. In 56 games with the Roadrunners, Crouse scored 15 goals and 32 points. In the playoffs, Crouse appeared in his first career AHL playoff game on April 19, earning an assist in a 4–2 win over the San Jose Barracuda. In game three of the series, on April 25, Crouse scored his first career AHL playoff goal against Antoine Bibeau of the Barracuda in a 6–0 Roadrunners victory.

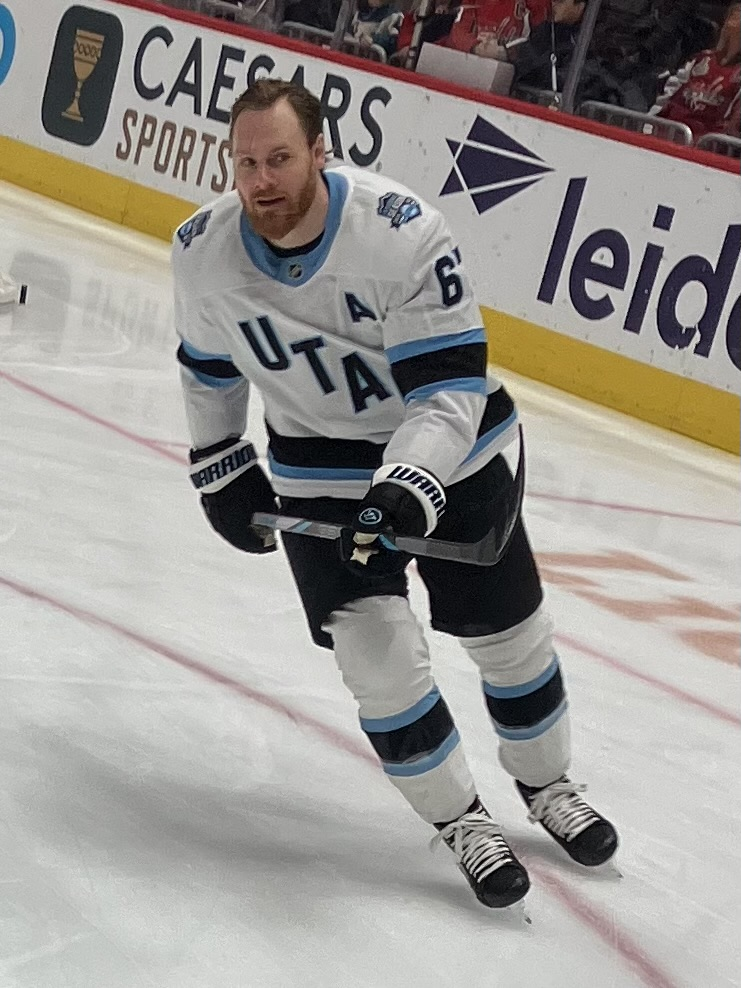
Crouse with the Utah Hockey Club in 2025.

Crouse played the entire 2018–19 season with Arizona, appearing in 81 games, while scoring an NHL career high 11 goals and 25 points. On June 2, 2019, Crouse, a restricted free agent, re-signed with the Coyotes on a three-year, $4.6 million contract. In the 2021–22 season, Crouse scored 20 goals and 34 points in 65 games with the Coyotes. On August 8, 2022, he re-signed with Arizona to a five-year $21.5 million contract. Crouse was named an alternate captain of the Coyotes during the 2022–23 season.

==== Utah Hockey Club/Mammoth ====
Shortly after the end of the 2023–24 regular season, the Coyotes' franchise was suspended and team assets were subsequently transferred to the expansion Utah Mammoth; as a result, Crouse became a member of Utah.

Crouse was named an associate/alternate captain for the team before the inaugural season, a title he has held since then.

== International play ==
Medal record

Representing Canada

Men's ice hockey

World Championships
Gold medal – first place	2023 Finland/Latvia	

World Junior Championships
Gold medal – first place	2015 Canada	

IIHF World U18 Championship
Bronze medal – third place	2014 Finland	

On May 5, 2023, Crouse was named to Canada men's national ice hockey team at the 2023 IIHF World Championship where he recorded six goals and three assists in ten games and won a gold medal.

== Personal life ==
Both of Crouse's older sisters, Sara and Kyla, also grew up playing ice hockey. While her brother was playing for Kingston, Kyla committed to play university hockey as a winger for the Golden Gaels of Queen's University at Kingston.

== Career statistics ==
=== Regular season and playoffs ===
			Regular season					Playoffs
Season	Team	League	GP	G	A	Pts	PIM	GP	G	A	Pts	PIM
2012–13	St. Thomas Stars	GOJHL	5	0	1	1	0	—	—	—	—	—
2013–14	Kingston Frontenacs	OHL	63	15	12	27	64	7	0	3	3	7
2014–15	Kingston Frontenacs	OHL	56	29	22	51	70	4	2	1	3	18
2015–16	Kingston Frontenacs	OHL	49	23	39	62	56	9	7	4	11	2
2015–16	Portland Pirates	AHL	2	0	0	0	0	—	—	—	—	—
2016–17	Arizona Coyotes	NHL	72	5	7	12	48	—	—	—	—	—
2017–18	Arizona Coyotes	NHL	11	1	0	1	7	—	—	—	—	—
2017–18	Tucson Roadrunners	AHL	56	15	17	32	70	9	2	6	8	2
2018–19	Arizona Coyotes	NHL	81	11	14	25	67	—	—	—	—	—
2019–20	Arizona Coyotes	NHL	66	15	10	25	33	9	2	0	2	2
2020–21	Arizona Coyotes	NHL	51	4	9	13	46	—	—	—	—	—
2021–22	Arizona Coyotes	NHL	65	20	14	34	52	—	—	—	—	—
2022–23	Arizona Coyotes	NHL	77	24	21	45	35	—	—	—	—	—
2023–24	Arizona Coyotes	NHL	81	23	19	42	36	—	—	—	—	—
2024–25	Utah Hockey Club	NHL	81	12	6	18	39	—	—	—	—	—
2025–26	Utah Mammoth	NHL	81	24	20	44	46	6	3	2	5	2
NHL totals			666	139	120	259	409	15	5	2	7	4

=== International ===
Year	Team	Event	Result	GP	G	A	Pts	PIM
2014	Canada Ontario	U17	5th	5	2	2	4	0
2014	Canada	U18	3rd place, bronze medalist(s)	7	1	0	1	0
2014	Canada	IH18	1st place, gold medalist(s)	5	6	0	6	8
2015	Canada	WJC	1st place, gold medalist(s)	7	1	2	3	0
2016	Canada	WJC	6th	5	2	3	5	2
2023	Canada	WC	1st place, gold medalist(s)	10	6	3	9	4
Junior totals				29	12	7	19	10
Senior totals				10	6	3	9	4

== Awards and honours ==
Award	Year
OHL
Second All-Rookie Team	2014

Awards and achievements
Preceded by Aaron Ekblad	Florida Panthers' first-round draft pick 2015	Succeeded by Henrik Borgstrom
