= 2023 IIHF World Championship Group A =

International ice hockey results

Group A was one of two groups of the 2023 IIHF World Championship. The four best-placed teams advanced to the playoff round, while Hungary, who finished last in the group, was relegated to Division I in 2024.

== Standings ==
Pos	Team	Pld	W	OTW	OTL	L	GF	GA	GD	Pts	Qualification or relegation
1	United States	7	6	1	0	0	34	8	+26	20	Quarterfinals
2	Sweden	7	5	1	1	0	26	7	+19	18	Quarterfinals
3	Finland (H)	7	5	0	1	1	28	15	+13	16	Quarterfinals
4	Germany	7	4	0	0	3	27	16	+11	12	Quarterfinals
5	Denmark	7	2	1	0	4	19	26	−7	8	Qualification for 2024 IIHF World Championship
6	France	7	0	1	2	4	10	31	−21	4	Qualification for 2024 IIHF World Championship
7	Austria	7	0	1	1	5	11	27	−16	3 (Note: Austria 4–3 Hungary)	Qualification for 2024 IIHF World Championship
8	Hungary	7	0	1	1	5	12	37	−25	3	Relegation to 2024 Division I A

Source: IIHF
Rules for classification: 1) points; 2) head-to-head points; 3) head-to-head goal difference; 4) head-to-head number of goals scored; 5) result against closest best-ranked team outside tied teams; 6) result against second-best-ranked team outside tied teams; 7) seeding before tournament
(H) Host

== Matches ==
All times are local (UTC+3).

=== Finland vs United States ===
12 May 2023; 16:20	Finland	1–4 (1–0, 0–1, 0–3)	United States	Nokia Arena, Tampere; Attendance: 12,056

Game reference

Emil Larmi
Goalies
Casey DeSmith
Referees:
(Sweden) Tobias Björk
(Canada) Adam Bloski
Linesmen:
(Czech Republic) Jiří Ondráček
(Slovakia) Šimon Synek

Hartikainen (Sallinen, Manninen) (PP) – 17:07	1–0
	1–1	33:48 – Gauthier (Mazur, Samberg)
	1–2	49:49 – O'Connor (Samberg, Garland)
	1–3	52:57 – A. Tuch (Grimaldi, O'Connor)
	1–4	59:12 – A. Tuch (O'Connor) (EN)

6 min
Penalties
4 min
24
Shots
38

=== Sweden vs Germany ===
12 May 2023; 20:20	Sweden	1–0 (0–0, 0–0, 1–0)	Germany	Nokia Arena, Tampere; Attendance: 9,179

Game reference
Lars Johansson	Goalies	Mathias Niederberger	Referees: (Finland) Mikko Kaukokari (Switzerland) Miroslav Stolc; Linesmen: (Switzerland) Eric Cattaneo (Canada) Tarrington Wyonzek
Lindberg (Berggren, Petersson) (PP) – 41:31 / 1–0			Referees: (Finland) Mikko Kaukokari (Switzerland) Miroslav Stolc; Linesmen: (Switzerland) Eric Cattaneo (Canada) Tarrington Wyonzek
8 min	Penalties	6 min	Referees: (Finland) Mikko Kaukokari (Switzerland) Miroslav Stolc; Linesmen: (Switzerland) Eric Cattaneo (Canada) Tarrington Wyonzek
23	Shots	19	Referees: (Finland) Mikko Kaukokari (Switzerland) Miroslav Stolc; Linesmen: (Switzerland) Eric Cattaneo (Canada) Tarrington Wyonzek

=== France vs Austria ===
13 May 2023; 12:20	France	2–1 OT (1–0, 0–0, 0–1) (OT: 1–0)	Austria	Nokia Arena, Tampere; Attendance: 7,626

Game reference

Sebastian Ylönen
Goalies
David Kickert
Referees:
(Denmark) Mads Frandsen
(Germany) Sirko Hunnius
Linesmen:
(Slovakia) Šimon Synek
(Canada) Tarrington Wyonzek

T. Bozon (Claireaux, Chakiachvili) (PP) – 19:29	1–0
	1–1	46:56 – Raffl (Schneider, Rossi) (PP)
Treille (Chakiachvili, T. Bozon) (PP) – 60:39	2–1

27 min
Penalties
10 min
28
Shots
28

=== Hungary vs Denmark ===
13 May 2023; 16:20	Hungary	1–3 (0–1, 0–1, 1–1)	Denmark	Nokia Arena, Tampere; Attendance: 7,633

Game reference

Bence Bálizs
Goalies
Frederik Dichow
Referees:
(Canada) Adam Bloski
(United States) Sean MacFarlane
Linesmen:
(Finland) Onni Hautamäki
(Canada) Brett Mackey

	0–1	15:55 – Ehlers (N. Jensen, Russell) (PP)
	0–2	29:23 – Ehlers (M. Lauridsen, N. Jensen) (PP)
Sofron (Szabó, Bartalis) – 46:42	1–2
	1–3	51:58 – Poulsen (Lassen, Storm)

12 min
Penalties
10 min
17
Shots
44

=== Germany vs Finland ===
13 May 2023; 20:20	Germany	3–4 (1–1, 2–2, 0–1)	Finland	Nokia Arena, Tampere; Attendance: 11,712

Game reference

Dustin Strahlmeier
Goalies
Juho Olkinuora
Referees:
(Latvia) Andris Ansons
(Switzerland) Miroslav Stolc
Linesmen:
(United States) Jake Davis
(Latvia) Dāvis Zunde

	0–1	09:30 – Armia (Kakko, Määttä)
Noebels (Fischbuch, Kastner) – 17:45	1–1
Wissmann (Kastner, Noebels) – 32:26	2–1
	2–2	34:09 – Manninen (Kapanen, Koivisto)
	2–3	35:56 – Manninen (Rantanen, Lehtonen) (PP)
Peterka (Kahun, Tiffels) (PP) – 39:41	3–3
	3–4	52:45 – Lehtonen (Rantanen, Hartikainen)

4 min
Penalties
8 min
13
Shots
25

=== United States vs Hungary ===
14 May 2023; 12:20	United States	7–1 (2–1, 2–0, 3–0)	Hungary	Nokia Arena, Tampere; Attendance: 5,258

Game reference

Cal Petersen
Goalies
Dominik Horváth
Referees:
(Denmark) Mads Frandsen
(Germany) Sirko Hunnius
Linesmen:
(Switzerland) Eric Cattaneo
(Canada) Tarrington Wyonzek

	0–1	04:07 – Sofron (Szabó, Bartalis)
A. Tuch (Grimaldi) – 06:16	1–1
Bonino (Grimaldi) – 18:38	2–1
Bonino (Garland, Perunovich) (PP) – 23:29	3–1
Gauthier (Coronato, Hutson) – 33:39	4–1
Mackey (Eyssimont, Garland) – 41:23	5–1
Grimaldi – 44:04	6–1
L. Tuch – 56:57	7–1

0 min
Penalties
4 min
50
Shots
14

=== France vs Denmark ===
14 May 2023; 16:20	France	3–4 OT (0–2, 3–1, 0–0) (OT: 0–1)	Denmark	Nokia Arena, Tampere; Attendance: 4,542

Game reference

Sebastian Ylönen
Goalies
Frederik Dichow
Referees:
(Sweden) Tobias Björk
(Finland) Mikko Kaukokari
Linesmen:
(United States) Jake Davis
(Czech Republic) Jiří Ondráček

	0–1	08:27 – Ehlers (M. Lauridsen, N. Jensen) (PP)
	0–2	18:03 – Bødker (J. Jensen, Bau) (PP)
Leclerc (Rech, Boudon) – 25:48	1–2
Rech – 28:29	2–2
	2–3	30:34 – Olesen
Addamo (Boscq, Gallet) – 39:31	3–3
	3–4	61:43 – Russell (M. Lauridsen, Ehlers) (PP)

33 min
Penalties
6 min
26
Shots
21

=== Sweden vs Austria ===
14 May 2023; 20:20	Sweden	5–0 (1–0, 2–0, 2–0)	Austria	Nokia Arena, Tampere; Attendance: 5,950

Game reference

Jesper Wallstedt
Goalies
Bernhard Starkbaum
Referees:
(Latvia) Andris Ansons
(United States) Sean MacFarlane
Linesmen:
(Finland) Onni Hautamäki
(Latvia) Dāvis Zunde

Lindholm (Berggren, Pudas) – 03:43	1–0
Sörensen (De la Rose, Tömmernes) – 26:04	2–0
Nemeth (Petersson, Lindholm) – 38:16	3–0
Carlsson (Raymond, Nylander) – 51:18	4–0
Everberg (Bengtsson, Nemeth) – 53:42	5–0

2 min
Penalties
4 min
32
Shots
18

=== Germany vs United States ===
15 May 2023; 16:20	Germany	2–3 (0–0, 2–1, 0–2)	United States	Nokia Arena, Tampere; Attendance: 8,003

Game reference

Mathias Niederberger
Goalies
Casey DeSmith
Referees:
(Sweden) Tobias Björk
(Finland) Mikko Kaukokari
Linesmen:
(Switzerland) Eric Cattaneo
(Czech Republic) Jiří Ondráček

	0–1	25:39 – Attard (Eyssimont, Tynan) (EA)
Soramies (M. Müller, Seider) (SH) – 30:23	1–1
Schütz (Tuomie, Gawanke) – 39:55	2–1
	2–2	45:58 – Farrell (Hutson)
	2–3	54:50 – Coronato (Perunovich, Tynan) (PP)

4 min
Penalties
8 min
32
Shots
26

=== Finland vs Sweden ===
15 May 2023; 20:20	Finland	1–2 GWS (0–0, 0–1, 1–0) (OT: 0–0) (SO: 0–1)	Sweden	Nokia Arena, Tampere; Attendance: 12,039

Game reference
Emil Larmi	Goalies	Lars Johansson	Referees: (Latvia) Andris Ansons (Denmark) Mads Frandsen; Linesmen: (Canada) Brett Mackey (Slovakia) Šimon Synek
/ 0–1 / 37:17 – Lindberg (Zetterlund, Berggren); Lammikko (Pesonen, Kapanen) – 46:47 / 1–1			Referees: (Latvia) Andris Ansons (Denmark) Mads Frandsen; Linesmen: (Canada) Brett Mackey (Slovakia) Šimon Synek
Oksanen; Kapanen (miss); Rantanen (miss); Hartikainen (miss); Armia; Oksanen (miss)	Shootout	Tömmernes; Raymond; (miss) Lindberg; (miss) Petersson; (miss) Sörensen; Raymond	Referees: (Latvia) Andris Ansons (Denmark) Mads Frandsen; Linesmen: (Canada) Brett Mackey (Slovakia) Šimon Synek
4 min	Penalties	6 min	Referees: (Latvia) Andris Ansons (Denmark) Mads Frandsen; Linesmen: (Canada) Brett Mackey (Slovakia) Šimon Synek
28	Shots	26	Referees: (Latvia) Andris Ansons (Denmark) Mads Frandsen; Linesmen: (Canada) Brett Mackey (Slovakia) Šimon Synek

=== Denmark vs Austria ===
16 May 2023; 16:20	Denmark	6–2 (1–0, 1–1, 4–1)	Austria	Nokia Arena, Tampere; Attendance: 3,131

Game reference

Frederik Dichow
Goalies
David Kickert
Referees:
(United States) Sean Fernandez
(Germany) Sirko Hunnius
Linesmen:
(Germany) Andreas Hofer
(Latvia) Dāvis Zunde

Ehlers (N. Jensen, J. Jensen) – 09:32	1–0
	1–1	27:15 – Raffl (Schneider, Heinrich) (PP)
Andersen (Aagaard) – 33:27	2–1
J. Jensen (Andersen, Aagaard) – 46:37	3–1
	3–2	48:40 – Schneider (Rossi, Maier)
N. Jensen (M. Lauridsen) (PP) – 51:46	4–2
Lassen (Andersen, Aagaard) – 53:00	5–2
Russell (Ehlers) – 57:03	6–2

4 min
Penalties
6 min
27
Shots
21

=== France vs Hungary ===
16 May 2023; 20:20	France	2–3 OT (1–1, 1–1, 0–0) (OT: 0–1)	Hungary	Nokia Arena, Tampere; Attendance: 3,075

Game reference

Sebastian Ylönen
Goalies
Bence Bálizs
Referees:
(Denmark) Mads Frandsen
(Canada) Mike Langin
Linesmen:
(Finland) Onni Hautamäki
(Canada) Brett Mackey

Bertrand (Gallet, Rech) (PP) – 16:28	1–0
	1–1	19:39 – Stipsicz (Sebők, Hári)
Boudon (Bertrand, T. Bozon) (PP) – 29:31	2–1
	2–2	33:03 – Galló (Sebők, Kiss)
	2–3	61:22 – Bartalis (Erdély, Horváth)

10 min
Penalties
8 min
28
Shots
21

=== United States vs Austria ===
17 May 2023; 16:20	United States	4–1 (0–0, 2–1, 2–0)	Austria	Nokia Arena, Tampere; Attendance: 7,676

Game reference

Cal Petersen
Goalies
Bernhard Starkbaum
Referees:
(Latvia) Andris Ansons
(Finland) Mikko Kaukokari
Linesmen:
(Finland) Onni Hautamäki
(Slovakia) Šimon Synek

Grimaldi (Bonino, Mackey) – 27:16	1–0
	1–1	37:23 – Raffl (Schneider, Rossi) (PP)
Mazur (Tynan, Hutson) – 38:20	2–1
Hutson (Perbix, Coronato) – 43:24	3–1
Perbix (Brown, Farrell) (EN) – 57:27	4–1

4 min
Penalties
4 min
31
Shots
19

=== Finland vs France ===
17 May 2023; 20:20	Finland	5–3 (1–1, 2–1, 2–1)	France	Nokia Arena, Tampere; Attendance: 11,638

Game reference

Emil Larmi
Goalies
Julian Junca
Referees:
(Sweden) Tobias Björk
(United States) Sean Fernandez
Linesmen:
(Canada) Brett Mackey
(Latvia) Dāvis Zunde

	0–1	01:04 – Chakiachvili (T. Bozon, Texier)
Pesonen (Pokka, Lammikko) – 04:37	1–1
Oksanen (Anttila, Friman) – 23:35	2–1
	2–2	28:31 – Addamo (Gallet, Leclerc)
Anttila (Matinpalo) – 31:36	3–2
Hartikainen (Manninen, Rantanen) (PP) – 45:22	4–2
	4–3	49:08 – Bertrand (Chakiachvili, T. Bozon)
Manninen (Rantanen, Määttä) (EN) – 58:58	5–3

4 min
Penalties
6 min
32
Shots
22

=== Hungary vs Sweden ===
18 May 2023; 16:20	Hungary	1–7 (1–3, 0–3, 0–1)	Sweden	Nokia Arena, Tampere; Attendance: 6,566

Game reference

Dominik Horváth
Goalies
Jesper Wallstedt
Referees:
(Germany) Sirko Hunnius
(United Kingdom) Liam Sewell
Linesmen:
(France) Nicolas Constantineau
(Germany) Andreas Hofer

	0–1	01:33 – Lindberg (Tömmernes, Lindholm)
	0–2	05:13 – De la Rose (Grundström) (SH)
Kiss (Bartalis, Garát) – 07:36	1–2
	1–3	17:50 – Everberg (Liljegren, Sandin)
	1–4	24:17 – Petersson (Tömmernes, Raymond) (PP2)
	1–5	37:37 – Berggren (Raymond, Liljegren)
	1–6	38:20 – De la Rose (Sörensen, Tömmernes)
	1–7	48:48 – Raymond (Carlsson, Tömmernes)

4 min
Penalties
4 min
9
Shots
51

=== Denmark vs Germany ===
18 May 2023; 20:20	Denmark	4–6 (1–0, 1–3, 2–3)	Germany	Nokia Arena, Tampere; Attendance: 3,964

Game reference

Frederik Dichow
Goalies
Mathias Niederberger
Referees:
(Czech Republic) Jan Hribik
(Canada) Mike Langin
Linesmen:
(United States) Nick Briganti
(Sweden) Emil Yletyinen

Lassen (M. Lauridsen, Ehlers) – 05:39	1–0
	1–1	29:12 – Peterka (Wissmann)
	1–2	31:08 – Ehl (M. Müller, Seider)
	1–3	37:51 – M. Müller (Noebels, Peterka)
Bau Hansen (Krogsgaard, Wejse) – 39:37	2–3
Wejse (Olesen, Andersen) – 55:01	3–3
	3–4	55:21 – J. Müller (Wissmann, Stachowiak)
	3–5	58:56 – Noebels (Sturm) (PP, EN)
Wejse (M. Lauridsen, Koch) (EA) – 59:28	4–5
	4–6	59:35 – Sturm (EN)

4 min
Penalties
0 min
20
Shots
35

=== Hungary vs Finland ===
19 May 2023; 16:20	Hungary	1–7 (0–1, 1–1, 0–5)	Finland	Nokia Arena, Tampere; Attendance: 11,547

Game reference

Bence Bálizs
Goalies
Juho Olkinuora
Referees:
(United States) Sean MacFarlane
(Czech Republic) Jan Hribik
Linesmen:
(France) Nicolas Constantineau
(Latvia) Dāvis Zunde

	0–1	12:52 – Lehtonen (Rantanen, Ohtamaa)
	0–2	23:09 – Kakko (Armia, Suomela) (PP)
Sebők (Pozsgai, Galló) – 26:46	1–2
	1–3	40:51 – Ohtamaa (Rantanen, Manninen)
	1–4	43:24 – Hartikainen (Rantanen, Lehtonen) (PP)
	1–5	46:20 – Kapanen (Kakko, Suomela)
	1–6	54:42 – Merelä (Friman, Björninen)
	1–7	59:01 – Armia (Määttä, Olkinuora) (PP)

12 min
Penalties
0 min
13
Shots
44

=== Austria vs Germany ===
19 May 2023; 20:20	Austria	2–4 (1–2, 0–1, 1–1)	Germany	Nokia Arena, Tampere; Attendance: 7,451

Game reference

David Kickert
Goalies
Mathias Niederberger
Referees:
(Latvia) Andris Ansons
(United Kingdom) Liam Sewell
Linesmen:
(Canada) Brett Mackey
(Sweden) Emil Yletyinen

	0–1	04:22 – Sturm (Ehl, Niederberger)
Wolf (Schneider, Rossi) – 11:15	1–1
	1–2	16:28 – Tuomie (Stachowiak, J. Müller)
	1–3	33:32 – Stachowiak (Schütz, M. Müller)
Haudum (Wukovits, Huber) – 53:25	2–3
	2–4	58:58 – Sturm (EN)

0 min
Penalties
4 min
18
Shots
24

=== United States vs Denmark ===
20 May 2023; 12:20	United States	3–0 (0–0, 0–0, 3–0)	Denmark	Nokia Arena, Tampere; Attendance: 8,951

Game reference

Casey DeSmith
Goalies
Frederik Dichow
Georg Sørensen
Referees:
(Finland) Lassi Heikkinen
(Canada) Mike Langin
Linesmen:
(Finland) Tommi Niittylä
(Austria) David Nothegger

Gauthier (A. Tuch, Tynan) (PP) – 49:51	1–0
A. Tuch (Grimaldi, Perunovich) – 55:30	2–0
Grimaldi (A. Tuch) (EN) – 59:19	3–0

6 min
Penalties
6 min
36
Shots
22

=== Austria vs Finland ===
20 May 2023; 16:20	Austria	1–3 (1–2, 0–0, 0–1)	Finland	Nokia Arena, Tampere; Attendance: 11,785

Game reference

David Madlener
Goalies
Emil Larmi
Referees:
(Sweden) Christoffer Holm
(Germany) Sirko Hunnius
Linesmen:
(United States) Nick Briganti
(Germany) Andreas Hofer

	0–1	01:19 – Kapanen (Kakko, Määttä)
Zwerger (Rossi) – 04:55	1–1
	1–2	07:31 – Suomela (Määttä, Koivisto)
	1–3	58:08 – Oksanen (Björninen)

4 min
Penalties
0 min
18
Shots
39

=== Sweden vs France ===
20 May 2023; 20:20	Sweden	4–0 (4–0, 0–0, 0–0)	France	Nokia Arena, Tampere; Attendance: 8,454

Game reference

Lars Johansson
Goalies
Julian Junca
Quentin Papillon
Referees:
(Latvia) Andris Ansons
(United States) Sean Fernandez
Linesmen:
(Canada) Brett Mackey
(Latvia) Dāvis Zunde

Lindholm (Tömmernes, Petersson) – 01:59	1–0
Zetterlund (Pudas, Tömmernes) – 09:25	2–0
Berggren (Carlsson, Tömmernes) (PP) – 16:26	3–0
Zetterlund (Lindberg, Raymond) (PP) – 19:54	4–0

6 min
Penalties
6 min
29
Shots
15

=== Germany vs Hungary ===
21 May 2023; 16:20	Germany	7–2 (1–0, 3–0, 3–2)	Hungary	Nokia Arena, Tampere; Attendance: 4,821

Game reference

Mathias Niederberger
Goalies
Dominik Horváth
Referees:
(Finland) Lassi Heikkinen
(Czech Republic) Jan Hribik
Linesmen:
(France) Nicolas Constantineau
(Austria) David Nothegger

Stachowiak (Schütz, Tuomie) – 07:58	1–0
Seider (Tiffels, Peterka) – 35:04	2–0
Sturm (Soramies, Ehl) – 35:22	3–0
Sturm (Noebels, Wissmann) (PP) – 37:55	4–0
Peterka (Tiffels, Wissmann) – 42:39	5–0
	5–1	46:11 – Terbócs (Vincze, Papp)
	5–2	48:13 – Fejes (Stipsicz, Sebők)
Kahun (Peterka) – 50:06	6–2
J. Müller (Wissmann, Peterka) – 58:38	7–2

29 min
Penalties
6 min
33
Shots
16

=== United States vs France ===
21 May 2023; 20:20	United States	9–0 (3–0, 1–0, 5–0)	France	Nokia Arena, Tampere; Attendance: 6,539

Game reference

Cal Petersen
Drew Commesso
Goalies
Quentin Papillon
Sebastian Ylönen
Referees:
(Sweden) Christoffer Holm
(United Kingdom) Liam Sewell
Linesmen:
(Canada) Brett Mackey
(Sweden) Emil Yletyinen

O'Connor (Garland) – 06:03	1–0
Gauthier (Perunovich) – 11:34	2–0
Tynan (Gauthier) – 13:53	3–0
Gauthier (Perunovich, Tynan) (PP) – 21:31	4–0
O'Connor – 42:22	5–0
Perunovich (Coronato, Bjork) – 45:01	6–0
Grimaldi (Coronato, Perbix) – 47:07	7–0
Garland (Tynan) – 48:36	8–0
Gauthier (Tynan, Garland) – 53:48	9–0

6 min
Penalties
6 min
44
Shots
13

=== Denmark vs Sweden ===
22 May 2023; 16:20	Denmark	1–4 (1–1, 0–1, 0–2)	Sweden	Nokia Arena, Tampere; Attendance: 6,573

Game reference

George Sorensen
Goalies
Jesper Wallstedt
Referees:
(United States) Sean Fernandez
(Czech Republic) Jan Hribik
Linesmen:
(Germany) Andreas Hofer
(Finland) Tommi Niittylä

N. Jensen (Ehlers) – 03:39	1–0
	1–1	13:24 – Everberg (Lindberg, Nylander)
	1–2	32:20 – Petersson (Lindberg, Raymond) (PP)
	1–3	52:40 – Petersson (Lindberg, Raymond) (PP)
	1–4	54:22 – Grundström (Lindholm, Petersson)

6 min
Penalties
4 min
11
Shots
34

=== Austria vs Hungary ===
22 May 2023; 20:20	Austria	4–3 GWS (1–2, 2–1, 0–0) (OT: 0–0) (SO: 1–0)	Hungary	Nokia Arena, Tampere; Attendance: 3,068

Game reference

Bernhard Starkbaum
Goalies
Bence Bálizs
Referees:
(Canada) Mike Langin
(United Kingdom) Liam Sewell
Linesmen:
(United States) Nick Briganti
(Sweden) Emil Yletyinen

	0–1	08:25 – Sofron (Erdély, Bartalis)
Rossi (PP) – 12:45	1–1
	1–2	19:21 – Sofron (Sebők, Stipsicz) (PP)
	1–3	24:11 – Horváth (Papp, Nagy)
Strong (Huber, Maier) – 26:43	2–3
Haudum (Zwerger, Reinbacher) (PP) – 37:09	3–3

Ganahl
Schneider (miss)
Rossi (miss)
Heinrich
Shootout
(miss) Papp
(miss) Galló
(miss) Hári
(miss) Nagy
4 min
Penalties
6 min
33
Shots
18

=== Germany vs France ===
23 May 2023; 12:20	Germany	5–0 (2–0, 1–0, 2–0)	France	Nokia Arena, Tampere; Attendance: 8,598

Game reference

Mathias Niederberger
Goalies
Sebastian Ylönen
Referees:
(Finland) Lassi Heikkinen
(Switzerland) Stefan Hürlimann
Linesmen:
(Denmark) Andreas Krøyer
(Austria) David Nothegger

Ehl (Stachowiak, Tuomie) – 03:31	1–0
Tiffels (Peterka, Kahun) – 15:55	2–0
Peterka – 22:07	3–0
Fischbuch (Wissmann, Noebels) (PP) – 43:51	4–0
Kastner (Noebels, Wissmann) – 53:34	5–0

6 min
Penalties
35 min
38
Shots
13

=== Sweden vs United States ===
23 May 2023; 16:20	Sweden	3–4 OT (1–1, 0–2, 2–0) (OT: 0–1)	United States	Nokia Arena, Tampere; Attendance: 8,781

Game reference

Lars Johansson
Goalies
Casey DeSmith
Referees:
(Canada) Mike Langin
(Germany) André Schrader
Linesmen:
(Czech Republic) Daniel Hynek
(Finland) Tommi Niittylä

Carlsson (Tömmernes, Lindberg) (PP2) – 09:10	1–0
	1–1	16:49 – Bonino (Gauthier, Tynan) (PP)
	1–2	33:54 – Garland (Mazur, Grimaldi) (PP)
	1–3	39:30 – Hutson
Carlsson (Berggren, Li. Johansson) – 54:51	2–3
Liljegren (Tömmernes, Lindberg) – 57:29	3–3
	3–4	61:37 – Samberg (Mazur, Tynan)

14 min
Penalties
33 min
26
Shots
43

=== Finland vs Denmark ===
23 May 2023; 20:20	Finland	7–1 (3–0, 3–0, 1–1)	Denmark	Nokia Arena, Tampere; Attendance: 11,491

Game reference

Emil Larmi
Goalies
Georg Sørensen
Referees:
(Sweden) Christoffer Holm
(United Kingdom) Liam Sewell
Linesmen:
(United States) Nick Briganti
(France) Nicolas Constantineau

Anttila (Matinpalo, Björninen) – 02:39	1–0
Ohtamaa (Rantanen, Manninen) – 03:31	2–0
Pokka (Seppälä, Kakko) – 18:36	3–0
Björninen (Pesonen, Seppälä) – 22:54	4–0
Lammikko (Seppälä) (SH) – 35:07	5–0
Kapanen (Kakko, Suomela) – 38:11	6–0
Matinpalo (Björninen, Oksanen) – 42:41	7–0
	7–1	42:53 – Ehlers (Krogsgaard, Gammelgaard)

6 min
Penalties
8 min
47
Shots
14
