= Anton Lindholm =

Swedish ice hockey player (born 1994)

- Born: 29 November 1994 (age 31) Skellefteå, Sweden
- Height: 6 ft 0 in (183 cm)
- Weight: 192 lb (87 kg; 13 st 10 lb)
- Position: Defence
- Shoots: Left
- NL team Former teams: SC Bern; Skellefteå AIK; Colorado Avalanche; Dinamo Minsk; Leksands IF
- National team: Sweden
- NHL draft: 144th overall, 2014; Colorado Avalanche
- Playing career: 2012–present

Anton Lindholm (born 29 November 1994) is a Swedish ice hockey defenceman. He is currently playing under contract with SC Bern in the National League (NL). Lindholm was selected by the Colorado Avalanche in the 5th round, 144th overall, at the 2014 National Hockey League (NHL) Entry Draft.

== Playing career ==
Lindholm played in the youth ranks of Varuträsk IF and SK Lejon before joining Skellefteå AIK at the age of 15. He made his Elitserien debut playing with Skellefteå AIK during the 2011–12 season. In the 2013–14 season, he played 39 games in the junior SuperElit level before he was promoted to the Senior side in the second half of the year. He made seven appearances in the regular season that year. Lindholm developed a physical presence and impressively established a top four defensive role in the playoffs, scoring three points in 14 games in helping Skellefteå claim the SHL Championship. Prior to being drafted by the Colorado Avalanche, on 14 April 2014, he was re-signed to a two-year extension to continue with Skellefteå. In 2014–15 and 2015–16, he helped the team to back-to-back appearances in the SHL finals and also competed in the Champions Hockey League, where Skellefteå managed a third-place finish in the 2014–15 season.

After 5 seasons in the SHL with Skellefteå, Lindholm earned the opportunity to follow his NHL ambitions in agreeing to a three-year, entry-level contract with the Colorado Avalanche on 24 May 2016. After attending the Avalanche's training camp and pre-season, Lindholm was assigned to American Hockey League affiliate, the San Antonio Rampage, to adjust to the North American style to begin the 2016–17 season on 7 October 2016. He made his debut with the Rampage on opening night in a 2–1 defeat to the Milwaukee Admirals on 15 October 2016. As a fixture on the Rampage blueline in adding a sound defensive game, Lindholm developed his offensive capability and scored his first goal in North America in a 4–3 overtime loss to the Texas Stars on 16 January 2017. After recording an increase in production and ice-time with the Rampage, Lindholm received his first recall to the Avalanche on 13 March 2017. He made his NHL debut with the Avalanche at the Pepsi Center, playing alongside veterans Francois Beauchemin and later Fedor Tyutin in a 3–1 victory over the Detroit Red Wings on 15 March 2017.

As a restricted free agent, Lindholm was signed to a two-year, two-way contract extension with the Avalanche on 23 July 2019. In the 2019–20 season, Lindholm split the season between the Avalanche and the Colorado Eagles. He appeared in four regular season games with the Avalanche, tallying an assist, and was on the club's playoff roster following the pause from the COVID-19 pandemic.

After his fourth season within the Avalanche organization and with one-year remaining on his contract, Lindholm was traded alongside Nikita Zadorov to the Chicago Blackhawks in exchange for Brandon Saad and Dennis Gilbert. In the following 2020–21 shortened season, Lindholm was assigned to the Rockford IceHogs of the AHL after attending the Blackhawks training camp. Remaining with the IceHogs for the entirety of the campaign, Lindholm was limited to just 16 games in adding 1 goal and 3 points.

As a free agent from the Blackhawks, Lindholm left North America and on 20 August 2021, was signed to a one-year contract with Belarusian club, HC Dinamo Minsk of the Kontinental Hockey League (KHL). As a regular on the blueline with Dinamo in the 2021–22 season, Lindholm collected 8 assists through 32 regular season games and made 4 post-season appearances.

On 18 May 2022, Lindholm as a free agent opted to return to his native Sweden in agreeing to a two-year contract with Leksands IF of the SHL.

After two seasons with Leksands, Lindholm opted to move abroad in agreeing to a two-year contract with Swiss club, SC Bern of the NL, on 29 April 2024.

== Career statistics ==
=== Regular season and playoffs ===
			Regular season					Playoffs
Season	Team	League	GP	G	A	Pts	PIM	GP	G	A	Pts	PIM
2010–11	Skellefteå AIK	J20	3	0	0	0	4	—	—	—	—	—
2011–12	Skellefteå AIK	J20	43	1	3	4	20	3	0	1	1	0
2011–12	Skellefteå AIK	SEL	1	0	0	0	0	—	—	—	—	—
2012–13	Skellefteå AIK	J20	37	1	9	10	24	5	1	0	1	2
2012–13	Skellefteå AIK	SEL	2	0	0	0	2	—	—	—	—	—
2013–14	Skellefteå AIK	J20	39	1	5	6	34	—	—	—	—	—
2013–14	Piteå HC	Div.1	1	0	1	1	0	—	—	—	—	—
2013–14	Skellefteå AIK	SHL	7	0	0	0	4	14	1	2	3	4
2014–15	Skellefteå AIK	SHL	35	0	7	7	35	15	1	4	5	8
2014–15	Malmö Redhawks	Allsv	5	1	2	3	2	—	—	—	—	—
2015–16	Skellefteå AIK	SHL	30	0	4	4	18	16	0	1	1	6
2016–17	San Antonio Rampage	AHL	62	2	11	13	39	—	—	—	—	—
2016–17	Colorado Avalanche	NHL	12	0	0	0	2	—	—	—	—	—
2017–18	Colorado Avalanche	NHL	48	0	4	4	14	—	—	—	—	—
2018–19	Colorado Eagles	AHL	57	1	7	8	16	4	1	0	1	0
2018–19	Colorado Avalanche	NHL	2	0	0	0	0	—	—	—	—	—
2019–20	Colorado Eagles	AHL	45	1	2	3	14	—	—	—	—	—
2019–20	Colorado Avalanche	NHL	4	0	1	1	0	—	—	—	—	—
2020–21	Rockford IceHogs	AHL	16	1	2	3	2	—	—	—	—	—
2021–22	Dinamo Minsk	KHL	32	0	8	8	14	4	0	0	0	4
2022–23	Leksands IF	SHL	50	7	14	21	35	3	0	2	2	0
2023–24	Leksands IF	SHL	39	3	5	8	33	7	1	2	3	0
2024–25	SC Bern	NL	20	2	3	5	10	—	—	—	—	—
2025–26	SC Bern	NL	39	0	6	6	19	1	0	0	0	0
SHL totals			164	10	30	40	127	55	3	11	14	18
NHL totals			66	0	5	5	16	—	—	—	—	—
KHL totals			32	0	8	8	14	4	0	0	0	4

=== International ===
Year	Team	Event	Result	GP	G	A	Pts	PIM
2016	Sweden	WC	6th	3	0	0	0	0
2022	Sweden	WC	6th	8	0	0	0	0
2023	Sweden	WC	6th	8	0	2	2	0
Senior totals				19	0	2	2	0
