= Lucas Raymond =

Swedish ice hockey player (born 2002)

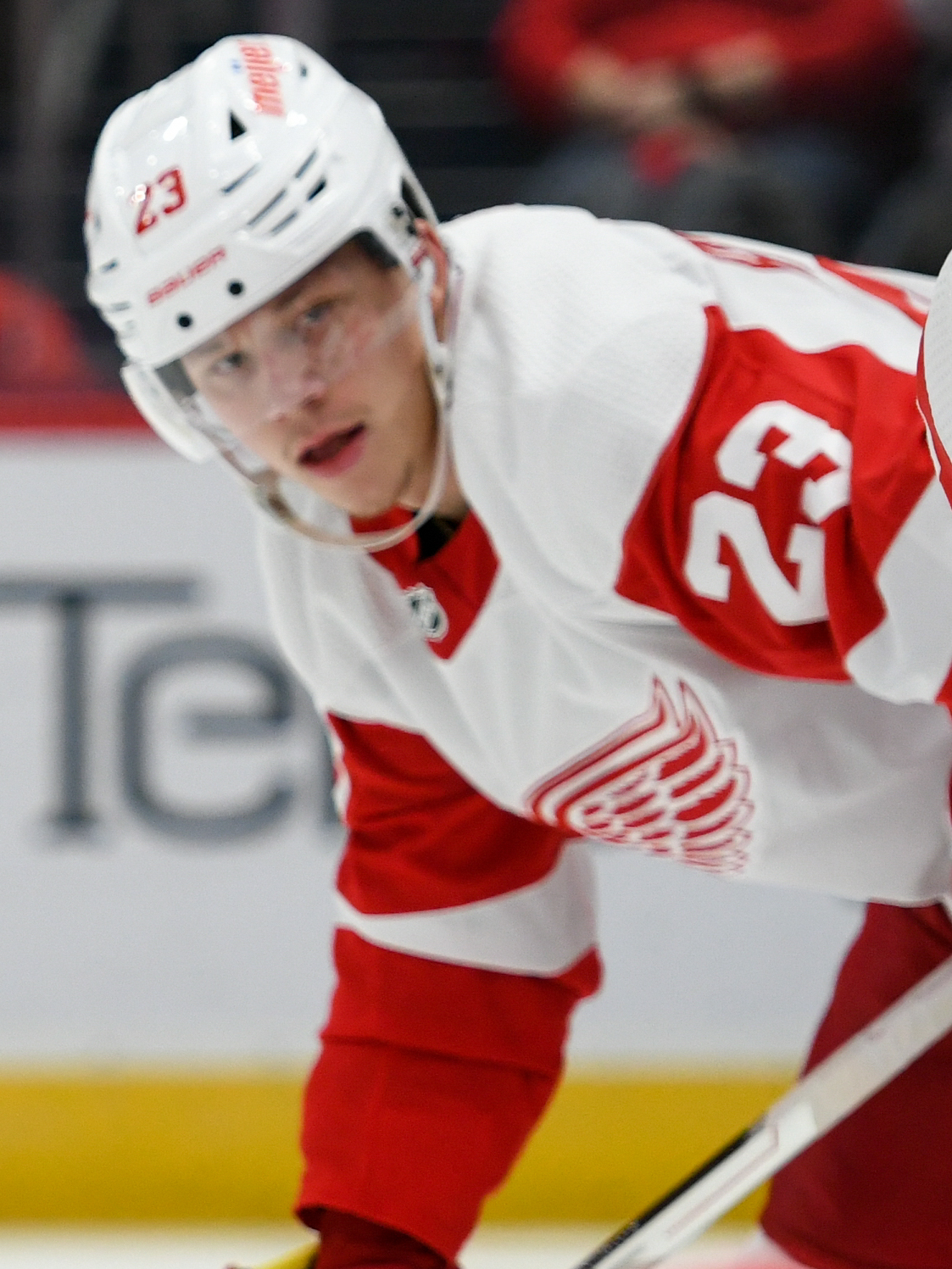
- Raymond with the Detroit Red Wings in 2021
- Born: 28 March 2002 (age 24) Gothenburg, Sweden
- Height: 5 ft 11 in (180 cm)
- Weight: 188 lb (85 kg; 13 st 6 lb)
- Position: Left wing
- Shoots: Right
- NHL team Former teams: Detroit Red Wings; Frölunda HC
- National team: Sweden
- NHL draft: 4th overall, 2020; Detroit Red Wings
- Playing career: 2018–present

Lucas Axel Louis Raymond (born 28 March 2002) is a Swedish professional ice hockey player who is a left winger and alternate captain for the Detroit Red Wings of the National Hockey League. He was drafted fourth overall by the Red Wings in the 2020 NHL entry draft.

== Playing career ==
On 4 October 2018, Raymond made his Swedish Hockey League (SHL) debut with Frölunda HC. In doing so, he became the first player born in 2002 to play in the SHL. Later that season on 28 December, he scored his first professional goal against Skellefteå AIK, at the age of 16.

On 17 April 2021, Raymond was signed by the Detroit Red Wings to a three-year, entry-level contract.

In his first North American season, Raymond made the Red Wings opening night roster to begin the 2021–22 season. On 19 October 2021, Raymond scored his first NHL goal on Joonas Korpisalo of the Columbus Blue Jackets, helping the Red Wings to a 4–1 victory. On 24 October, Raymond scored his first career NHL hat trick against Marc-André Fleury and posted a career-best four points in a 6–3 victory over the Chicago Blackhawks. Raymond was named the NHL Rookie of the Month for November 2021 after recording 12 points in 14 games.

At the end of the 2023-24 season, Raymond led the Detroit Red Wings with 72 points, broken down into 31 goals and 41 assists. This raised anticipation surrounding his then-pending contract extension.

On 16 September 2024, it was announced that he signed an eight-year, 64.6 million-dollar contract extension with the Detroit Red Wings. During the 2024-25 season following his extension, he recorded his first NHL shorthanded goal against Buffalo Sabres netminder Ukko-Pekka Luukkonen on 26 October 2024, and tallied a career-high of 80 points.

In February 2025, Raymond participated in the Four Nations Face-Off, a best-on-best hockey tournament that was held in place of the NHL All Star Game and skills competition. There he tallied 3 points for Sweden.

Raymond hit several milestones during the 2025-26 season, recording his 100th NHL goal on 11 October 2025 - a go-ahead powerplay goal in a win against the Toronto Maple Leafs. On 8 January 2026, he recorded his 300th NHL point, becoming the third youngest Detroit Red Wing to reach the milestone, behind only Steve Yzerman and Marcel Dionne. Later that season, in April 2026, Lucas Raymond and Moritz Seider combined to make 2025-26 the first Red Wings season since 2007-08 to feature multiple players with 50+ assists (Niklas Lidstrom and Pavel Datsyuk).

== Personal life ==
His father Jean was born in France and moved to Sweden at the age of 15. He has an older brother named Hugo.

== International play ==
Medal record

Representing Sweden

Ice hockey

World Championships
Bronze medal – third place	2024 Czechia	
Bronze medal – third place	2025 Sweden/Denmark	

World Junior Championships
Bronze medal – third place	2020 Czech Republic	

World U18 Championships
Gold medal – first place	2019 Sweden	

Raymond appeared in the 2019 IIHF Ice Hockey U18 World Championship, playing for Sweden. He helped Sweden win its first ever medal in the tournament when he completed a hat trick with an overtime goal to beat Russia in the final.

He represented Sweden as an alternate captain at the 2024 IIHF World Championship and won a bronze medal, and served as an alternate captain for team Sweden again at the 2025 IIHF World Championship, playing an even more pivotal role in securing back-to-back bronze for his country. During the tournament he put up eleven points, including two high-impact goals against Czechia in the quarterfinal round and a goal in the 6-2 victory over Denmark in the bronze medal match on 25 May 2025.

Raymond made his Olympic debut in February 2026, playing for Sweden in the XXV Olympic Winter Games held in Milan, Italy. There he ranked third out of all men’s tournament competitors in points, tallying one goal and a record eight assists for Sweden in five games-played, before the team fell to the United States in the quarter-final.

== Career statistics ==
=== Regular season and playoffs ===
			Regular season					Playoffs
Season	Team	League	GP	G	A	Pts	PIM	GP	G	A	Pts	PIM
2017–18	Frölunda HC	J18	18	14	20	34	6	—	—	—	—	—
2017–18	Frölunda HC	J20	8	0	0	0	2	—	—	—	—	—
2018–19	Frölunda HC	J20	37	13	35	48	24	6	4	5	9	4
2018–19	Frölunda HC	SHL	10	2	0	2	0	—	—	—	—	—
2019–20	Frölunda HC	J20	9	3	11	14	6	—	—	—	—	—
2019–20	Frölunda HC	SHL	33	4	6	10	4	—	—	—	—	—
2020–21	Frölunda HC	SHL	34	6	12	18	12	—	—	—	—	—
2021–22	Detroit Red Wings	NHL	82	23	34	57	16	—	—	—	—	—
2022–23	Detroit Red Wings	NHL	74	17	28	45	24	—	—	—	—	—
2023–24	Detroit Red Wings	NHL	82	31	41	72	30	—	—	—	—	—
2024–25	Detroit Red Wings	NHL	82	27	53	80	18	—	—	—	—	—
2025–26	Detroit Red Wings	NHL	80	25	51	76	22	—	—	—	—	—
SHL totals			77	12	18	30	16	—	—	—	—	—
NHL totals			400	123	207	330	110	—	—	—	—	—

=== International ===
Year	Team	Event	Result	GP	G	A	Pts	PIM
2018	Sweden	HG18	2nd place, silver medalist(s)	5	5	2	7	2
2018	Sweden	U17	3rd place, bronze medalist(s)	6	4	3	7	14
2019	Sweden	U18	1st place, gold medalist(s)	7	4	4	8	12
2020	Sweden	WJC	3rd place, bronze medalist(s)	7	2	2	4	2
2021	Sweden	WJC	5th	5	2	3	5	2
2023	Sweden	WC	6th	8	2	6	8	4
2024	Sweden	WC	3rd place, bronze medalist(s)	10	4	5	9	2
2025	Sweden	4NF	3rd	3	0	3	3	0
2025	Sweden	WC	3rd place, bronze medalist(s)	10	5	6	11	2
2026	Sweden	OG	7th	5	1	8	9	6
2026	Sweden	WC	7th	8	5	6	11	0
Junior totals				30	17	14	31	32
Senior totals				44	17	34	51	14

== Awards and honors ==
Award	Year	Ref
NHL
NHL All-Rookie Team	2022	
International
World Hockey Challenge All-Star Team	2018	

Awards and achievements
Preceded by Moritz Seider	Detroit Red Wings first-round draft pick 2020	Succeeded by Simon Edvinsson
