= Parker Tuomie =

German ice hockey player (born 1995)

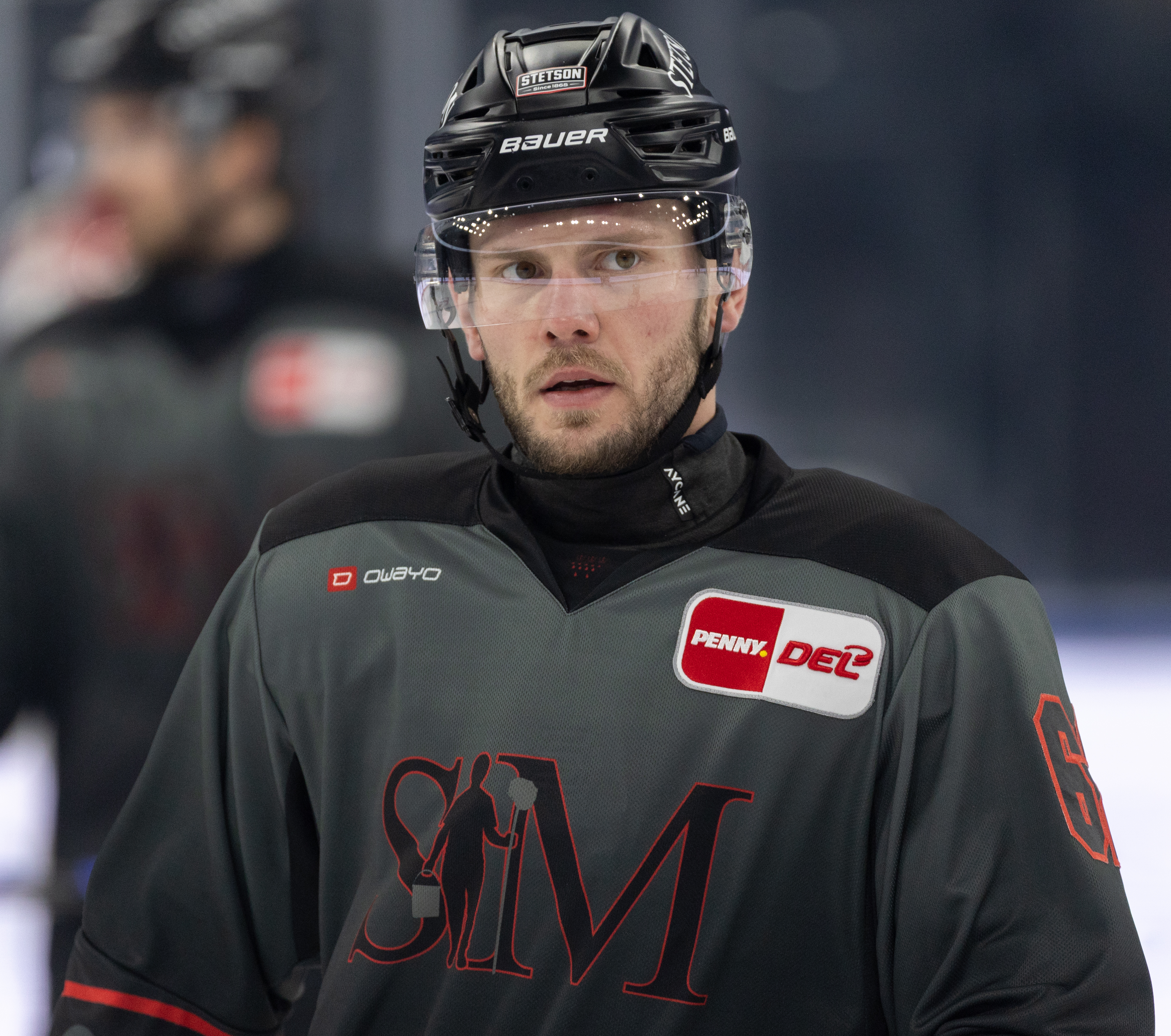
- Tuomie in December 2025
- Born: 31 October 1995 (age 30) Haßfurt, Germany
- Height: 178 cm (5 ft 10 in)
- Weight: 84 kg (185 lb; 13 st 3 lb)
- Position: Winger
- Shoots: Left
- DEL team Former teams: Fischtown Pinguins; Eisbären Berlin; Straubing Tigers; Kölner Haie
- National team: Germany
- NHL draft: Undrafted
- Playing career: 2020–present

Parker Tuomie (born 31 October 1995) is a German professional ice hockey player who is a winger for Fischtown Pinguins of the Deutsche Eishockey Liga (DEL).

== Playing career ==
Tuomie played college hockey for the Minnesota State Mavericks from 2016 to 2020.

== International play ==
Tuomie represented the Germany national team at the 2026 Winter Olympics, and the 2023 and 2024 IIHF World Championship.

== Personal life ==
His father, Tray Tuomie, is an American who played professional hockey in Germany.

== Career statistics ==
=== Regular season and playoffs ===
			Regular season					Playoffs
Season	Team	League	GP	G	A	Pts	PIM	GP	G	A	Pts	PIM
2009–10	Eisbären Juniors Berlin U16	Schüler-BL	24	28	48	76	20	5	1	8	9	0
2010–11	Düsseldorfer EG U16	Schüler-BL	28	16	38	54	8	5	2	3	5	2
2010–11	DEG Eishockey U18	DNL	8	2	1	3	0	5	1	0	1	0
2011–12	DEG Eishockey U18	DNL	34	15	19	34	24	7	1	5	6	8
2012–13	Jungadler Mannheim U18	DNL	36	26	46	72	48	7	7	6	13	4
2013–14	Wenatchee Wild	NAHL	49	24	25	49	43	10	3	0	3	4
2014–15	Sioux Falls Stampede	USHL	52	19	15	34	34	12	1	3	4	0
2015–16	Sioux Falls Stampede	USHL	59	30	24	54	28	3	0	0	0	4
2016–17	Minnesota State University, Mankato	NCAA	39	8	10	18	14	—	—	—	—	—
2017–18	Minnesota State University, Mankato	NCAA	40	9	28	37	37	—	—	—	—	—
2018–19	Minnesota State University, Mankato	NCAA	36	14	26	40	52	—	—	—	—	—
2019–20	Minnesota State University, Mankato	NCAA	37	14	23	37	16	—	—	—	—	—
2020–21	Eisbären Berlin	DEL	38	11	11	22	6	9	0	2	2	6
2021–22	Eisbären Berlin	DEL	14	0	1	1	0	—	—	—	—	—
2021–22	Straubing Tigers	DEL	34	5	5	10	6	4	0	3	3	0
2022–23	Straubing Tigers	DEL	51	12	14	26	14	7	1	2	3	4
2023–24	Straubing Tigers	DEL	30	8	13	21	10	10	0	3	3	6
2024–25	Kölner Haie	DEL	51	8	17	25	12	17	2	2	4	4
2025–26	Kölner Haie	DEL	34	6	13	19	16	8	1	3	4	0
DEL totals			252	50	74	124	64	55	4	15	19	20

=== International ===
Year	Team	Event	GP	G	A	Pts	PIM
2012	Germany U17	WHC-17	5	0	2	2	4
2013	Germany U18	WJC-18	5	2	2	4	2
2014	Germany U20	WJC-20	6	0	0	0	4
2015	Germany U20	WJC-20	6	2	0	2	2
2023	Germany	WC	10	1	3	4	2
2024	Germany	WC	8	2	3	5	0
2026	Germany	OG	3	0	0	0	0
2026	Germany	WC	7	0	0	0	0
Junior totals			22	4	4	8	12
Senior totals			28	3	6	9	2
