= Rocco Grimaldi =

American ice hockey player (born 1993)

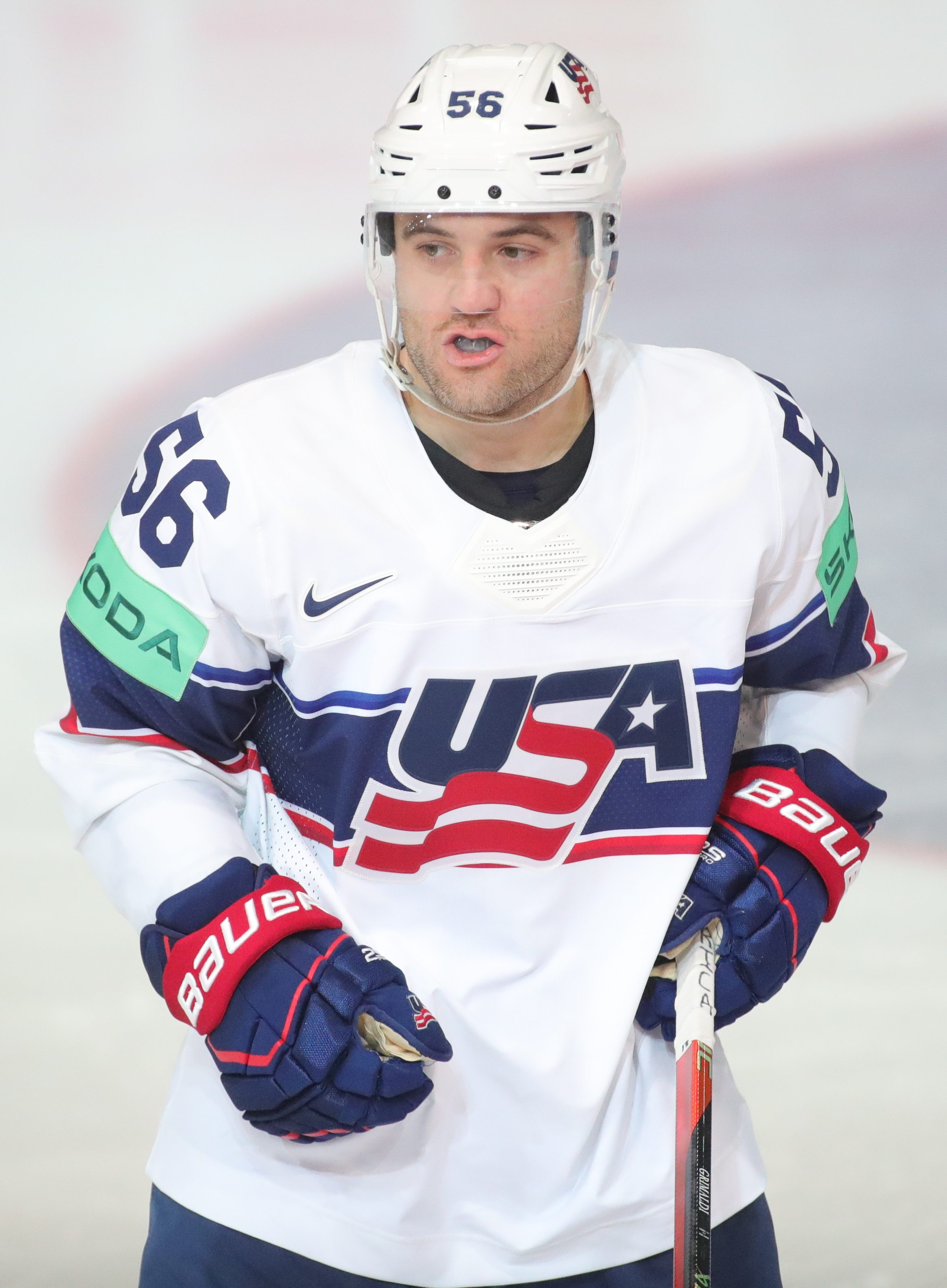
- Grimaldi with Team USA in 2023
- Born: February 8, 1993 (age 33) Anaheim, California, U.S.
- Height: 5 ft 6 in (168 cm)
- Weight: 180 lb (82 kg; 12 st 12 lb)
- Position: Right wing
- Shoots: Right
- KHL team Former teams: SKA Saint Petersburg; Florida Panthers; Colorado Avalanche; Nashville Predators
- National team: United States
- NHL draft: 33rd overall, 2011; Florida Panthers
- Playing career: 2014–present

Rocco Niccolas Grimaldi (born February 8, 1993) is an American professional ice hockey forward for SKA Saint Petersburg of the Kontinental Hockey League (KHL). Grimaldi was drafted in the second round, 33rd overall, by the Florida Panthers in the 2011 NHL entry draft.

== Early life ==
At the age of five, Grimaldi started to play roller hockey in California. When he was first exposed to the game, he thought it looked more exciting than baseball and basketball. In 2005, Grimaldi and some of his family relocated from Rossmoor to Michigan so that he could play against a better level of competition. As a youth, he played in the 2004 and 2005 Quebec International Pee-Wee Hockey Tournament with the California Wave minor ice hockey team, and in the 2006 Quebec International Pee-Wee Hockey Tournament with the Detroit Little Caesars team.

== Playing career ==
Grimaldi played AAA Hockey for Detroit Little Caesars during the 2008–2009 season, collecting 43 points with 17 goals and 26 assists in 31 games. He then played two seasons with the USA Hockey National Team Development Program against junior teams in the United States Hockey League. During the 2009–10 season, Grimaldi led the United States Under 17 national team in scoring with 40 points in 36 games.

During the 2010–11 season, he led Team USA in scoring with 34 goals and 28 assists in 50 games. Grimaldi was eligible to be drafted into the National Hockey League (NHL) in 2011. Prior to the draft, there were concerns about his size. At 5'6", he is smaller than most NHL players. Grimaldi is not concerned about his size, and takes the questions about it in stride, "I think it’s fun." The 2011–12 Hockey Prospectus ranked Grimaldi as its #36 best hockey prospect noting that he "overcomes his diminutive size with off the chart intangibles and physical ability."

Grimaldi committed to the University of North Dakota and entered his freshman season for UND in the 2011–12 season.

On May 7, 2014, Grimaldi signed a three-year entry-level contract with the Florida Panthers. In the 2014–15 season, Grimaldi made his professional debut with the Panthers AHL affiliate, the San Antonio Rampage. On November 1, 2014, he received his first NHL recall and made his NHL debut with the Panthers in a 2–1 victory over the Philadelphia Flyers the following day. He was again called up to the Panthers on November 18, achieving the rare feat of playing two games in one day—a morning matinee with the Rampage, and another with the Panthers that evening (the morning game, coupled with the Panthers playing on the West Coast that evening and thus played three hours later than usual, allowed Grimaldi the time to travel to the second game).

On June 23, 2016, Grimaldi was traded by the Panthers to the Colorado Avalanche for goaltender Reto Berra. After attending his first training camp with the Avalanche, Grimaldi was reassigned to affiliate and former AHL club, the San Antonio Rampage, on September 30, 2016, to begin the 2016–17 season. After 19 games, Grimaldi was leading the Rampage in scoring with 15 points, when he received his first recall to Colorado on December 2, 2016. He made his Avalanche debut the following night in a 3–0 defeat to the Dallas Stars and was returned to the Rampage at the conclusion of the game.

On July 26, 2017, the Avalanche re-signed Grimaldi to a one-year, two-way contract. In the 2017–18 season, Grimaldi spent the majority of the campaign with the Rampage, where he recorded 31 points in 49 games. He played in a further 6 games in the NHL with the Avalanche, posting a goal and two assists and recording his second-career two-point game on October 28, 2017, against the Chicago Blackhawks.

As a group IV free agent, Grimaldi opted to leave the Avalanche and agreed to a one-year, two-way contract with the Nashville Predators on July 1, 2018.

On February 24, 2020, during the NHL Trade Deadline, the Predators signed Grimaldi to a two-year contract extension. On March 25, 2021, in a home game against the Detroit Red Wings, Grimaldi scored 3 goals in the 1st period. This was his first career hat trick, and he set a franchise record for the fastest hat trick by a Predators player (2 minutes and 34 seconds). He would add a 4th goal in the third period, making him only the 2nd player in Predators history to score 4 goals in 1 game along with Eric Nystrom.

As a free agent from the Predators at the conclusion of his contract following the 2021–22 season, Grimaldi went un-signed over the summer. In preparation for the 2022–23 season, Grimaldi agreed to join the Anaheim Ducks on a professional tryout basis, attending training camp and the pre-season. After impressing through the Ducks pre-season, Grimaldi was signed to a one-year AHL contract with affiliate, the San Diego Gulls, on October 15, 2022. Grimaldi was leading the languishing Gulls in scoring, notching 27 goal and 56 points through only 54 games before he was traded to the Rockford IceHogs on March 2, 2023.

Off the back of his most productive season as a professional, collecting 36 goals and 73 points through 72 games with the Chicago Wolves, Grimaldi was unable to secure an NHL contract for the 2024–25 season. On October 11, 2024, he agreed to a professional try-out to join the Cleveland Monsters of the AHL, primary affiliate to the Columbus Blue Jackets. Grimaldi continued to demonstrate his offensive prowess at the AHL level, notching 17 goals and 58 points through 65 regular season games in helping the Monsters qualify for the post-season.

After 11 professional seasons in North America, Grimaldi opted to move abroad as a free agent in signing a two-year contract with Russian club, SKA Saint Petersburg of the KHL, on August 13, 2025.

== International play ==
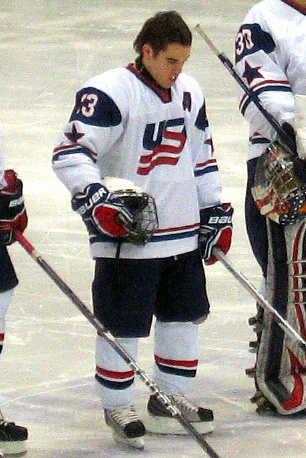

Medal record

Representing United States

Ice hockey

World Junior Championships
| Gold medal – first place | 2013 Ufa | |

IIHF World U18 Championships
| Gold medal – first place | 2010 Belarus | |
| Gold medal – first place | 2011 Germany | |

World U-17 Hockey Challenge
| Gold medal – first place | 2010 Ontario | |

Grimaldi was selected to the United States Under 18 team and helped the team win their second straight World Championship on April 10, 2010. In the gold medal game versus Sweden, Grimaldi had one goal and one assist as the United States triumphed by a 3–1 mark. Rocco Grimaldi scored twice vs. Finland on Friday, November 12 at the 2010 Men's Under-18 Four Nations Cup. He was a member of Team USA's gold medal-winning team at the 2013 World Junior Ice Hockey Championships, scoring two goals, including the game winner, in the championship game against Sweden.

A decade after his last appearance in international junior competition, Grimaldi accepted an invitation to join the senior national team at the 2023 IIHF World Championship. He recorded seven goals and seven assists in ten games, finishing as the tournament's leading scorer. The Americans reached the bronze medal game, but were upset by Latvia. Widely recognized as a standout player at the event, he was subsequently named to the Media All-Star Team.

== Personal life ==
Grimaldi was born in Anaheim, California. Grimaldi is a devout born-again Christian. His father was a police officer in California. His mother was the Little Caesars AAA Hockey club team manager.

In July 2016, Grimaldi married Abigail (Abby) Mattson.

== Career statistics ==
=== Regular season and playoffs ===
| | | | Regular season | | | | | Playoffs |
| Season | Team | League | GP | G | A | Pts | PIM | GP | G | A | Pts | PIM |
|---|---|---|---|---|---|---|---|---|---|---|---|---|
| 2009–10 | U.S. NTDP Juniors | USHL | 32 | 11 | 9 | 20 | 22 | — | — | — | — | — |
| 2009–10 | U.S. NTDP U17 | USDP | 36 | 14 | 26 | 40 | 38 | — | — | — | — | — |
| 2009–10 | U.S. NTDP U18 | USDP | 26 | 7 | 16 | 23 | 12 | — | — | — | — | — |
| 2010–11 | U.S. NTDP Juniors | USHL | 23 | 12 | 13 | 25 | 18 | — | — | — | — | — |
| 2010–11 | U.S. NTDP U18 | USDP | 58 | 39 | 34 | 73 | 65 | — | — | — | — | — |
| 2011–12 | University of North Dakota | WCHA | 4 | 1 | 1 | 2 | 2 | — | — | — | — | — |
| 2012–13 | University of North Dakota | WCHA | 40 | 13 | 23 | 36 | 18 | — | — | — | — | — |
| 2013–14 | University of North Dakota | NCHC | 42 | 17 | 22 | 39 | 48 | — | — | — | — | — |
| 2014–15 | San Antonio Rampage | AHL | 64 | 14 | 28 | 42 | 22 | 3 | 1 | 0 | 1 | 4 |
| 2014–15 | Florida Panthers | NHL | 7 | 1 | 0 | 1 | 4 | — | — | — | — | — |
| 2015–16 | Portland Pirates | AHL | 52 | 16 | 17 | 33 | 20 | 5 | 0 | 4 | 4 | 0 |
| 2015–16 | Florida Panthers | NHL | 20 | 3 | 2 | 5 | 2 | 2 | 0 | 0 | 0 | 2 |
| 2016–17 | San Antonio Rampage | AHL | 72 | 31 | 24 | 55 | 39 | — | — | — | — | — |
| 2016–17 | Colorado Avalanche | NHL | 4 | 0 | 1 | 1 | 2 | — | — | — | — | — |
| 2017–18 | San Antonio Rampage | AHL | 49 | 15 | 16 | 31 | 32 | — | — | — | — | — |
| 2017–18 | Colorado Avalanche | NHL | 6 | 1 | 2 | 3 | 0 | — | — | — | — | — |
| 2018–19 | Milwaukee Admirals | AHL | 10 | 4 | 7 | 11 | 8 | — | — | — | — | — |
| 2018–19 | Nashville Predators | NHL | 53 | 5 | 8 | 13 | 10 | 5 | 3 | 0 | 3 | 0 |
| 2019–20 | Nashville Predators | NHL | 66 | 10 | 21 | 31 | 10 | 4 | 0 | 1 | 1 | 2 |
| 2020–21 | Nashville Predators | NHL | 40 | 10 | 3 | 13 | 4 | — | — | — | — | — |
| 2021–22 | Nashville Predators | NHL | 7 | 0 | 0 | 0 | 2 | — | — | — | — | — |
| 2021–22 | Milwaukee Admirals | AHL | 44 | 26 | 26 | 52 | 14 | 6 | 1 | 1 | 2 | 0 |
| 2022–23 | San Diego Gulls | AHL | 54 | 27 | 29 | 56 | 31 | — | — | — | — | — |
| 2022–23 | Rockford IceHogs | AHL | 16 | 6 | 11 | 17 | 12 | 5 | 1 | 3 | 4 | 2 |
| 2023–24 | Chicago Wolves | AHL | 72 | 36 | 37 | 73 | 38 | — | — | — | — | — |
| 2024–25 | Cleveland Monsters | AHL | 66 | 17 | 41 | 58 | 20 | 6 | 1 | 1 | 2 | 4 |
| 2025–26 | SKA Saint Petersburg | KHL | 66 | 16 | 20 | 36 | 32 | 4 | 0 | 0 | 0 | 0 |
| NHL totals | | | 203 | 30 | 37 | 67 | 34 | 11 | 3 | 1 | 4 | 4 |
| KHL totals | | | 66 | 16 | 20 | 36 | 32 | 4 | 0 | 0 | 0 | 0 |

=== International ===
| Year | Team | Event | Result | GP | G | A | Pts | PIM |
|---|---|---|---|---|---|---|---|---|
| 2010 | United States | U17 | 1st place, gold medalist(s) | 6 | 4 | 10 | 14 | 8 |
| 2010 | United States | U18 | 1st place, gold medalist(s) | 7 | 2 | 8 | 10 | 6 |
| 2011 | United States | U18 | 1st place, gold medalist(s) | 6 | 2 | 6 | 8 | 6 |
| 2013 | United States | WJC | 1st place, gold medalist(s) | 7 | 2 | 2 | 4 | 4 |
| 2023 | United States | WC | 4th | 10 | 7 | 7 | 14 | 6 |
| Junior totals | | | | 26 | 10 | 26 | 36 | 24 |
| Senior totals | | | | 10 | 7 | 7 | 14 | 6 |

== Awards and honors ==
| Award | Year |
|---|---|
USHL
| All-Star Game | 2011 |
College
| NCAA Regional Champions | 2014 |
| All-WCHA Rookie Team | 2013 |
| WCHA All-Academic Team | 2013 |
AHL
| Second All-Star Team | 2024 |
International
| U17 WHC All-Star Team | 2010 |
| U17 WHC Most Assists | 2010 |
| U17 WHC Most Points | 2010 |
| World Championship Media All-Star Team | 2023 |
