= T. J. Tynan =

American ice hockey player (born 1992)

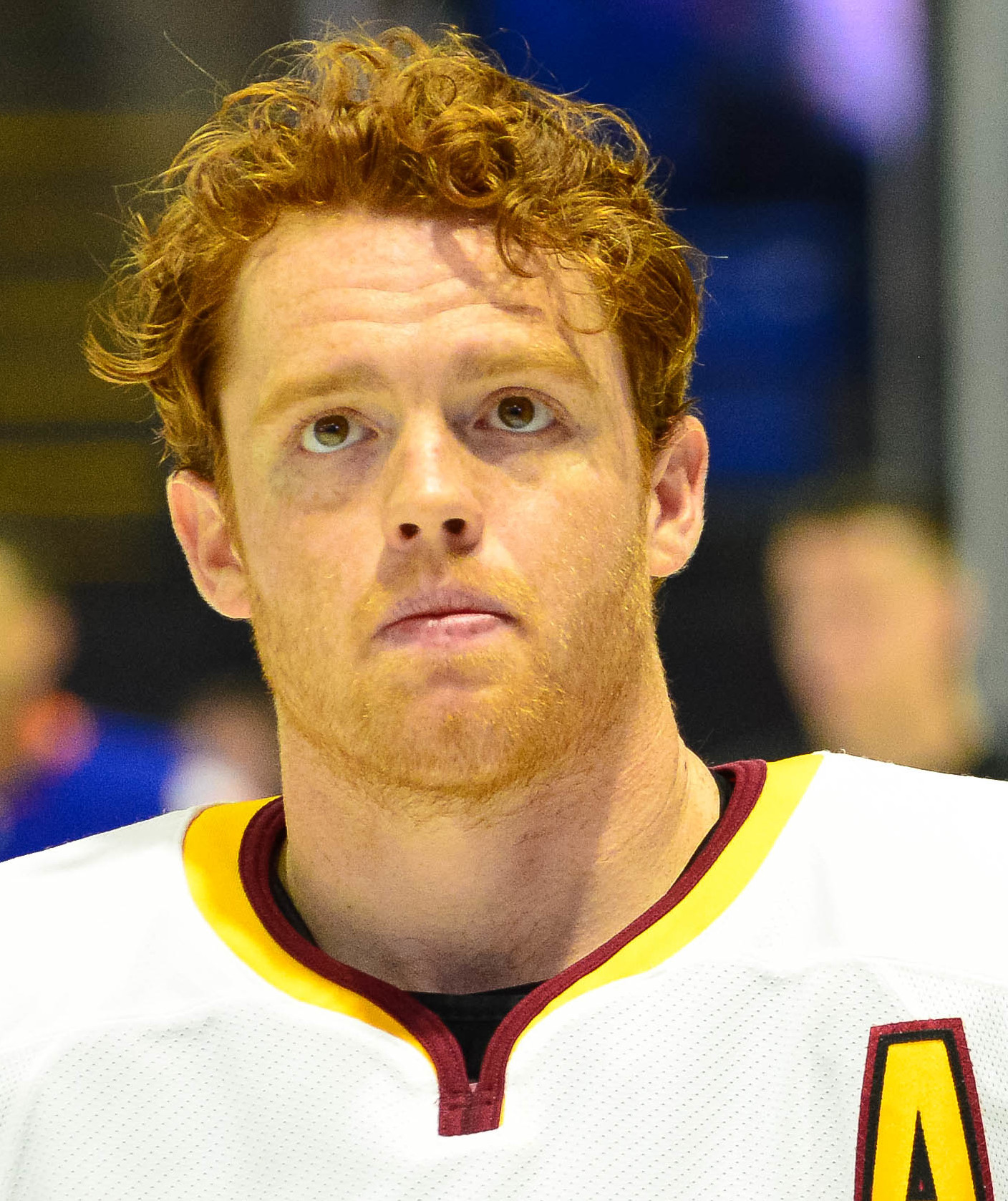
- Tynan with the Chicago Wolves in 2018
- Born: February 25, 1992 (age 34) Orland Park, Illinois, U.S.
- Height: 5 ft 8 in (173 cm)
- Weight: 165 lb (75 kg; 11 st 11 lb)
- Position: Forward
- Shoots: Right
- AHL team Former teams: Springfield Thunderbirds; Columbus Blue Jackets; Colorado Avalanche; Los Angeles Kings
- National team: United States
- NHL draft: 66th overall, 2011; Columbus Blue Jackets
- Playing career: 2014–present

Thomas Joseph Tynan (born February 25, 1992) is an American professional ice hockey player who is a forward for the Springfield Thunderbirds of the American Hockey League (AHL). Tynan was drafted in the third round, 66th overall, by the Columbus Blue Jackets in the 2011 NHL entry draft.

== Playing career ==
Tynan played collegiate hockey for the Notre Dame Fighting Irish men's ice hockey team which competed in NCAA's Division I in the Central Collegiate Hockey Association conference and Hockey East for his final year.

On April 1, 2014, the Columbus Blue Jackets of the National Hockey League (NHL) signed Tynan to a two-year entry-level contract. Tynan was assigned to the Springfield Falcons upon completion of Notre Dame's season. Tynan made his NHL debut against the New Jersey Devils on March 8, 2017.

On July 1, 2017, having left the Blue Jackets as a free agent, Tynan agreed to a two-year, two-way contract with expansion club, the Vegas Golden Knights. After attending the Golden Knights inaugural training camp, Tynan was assigned for the duration of the 2017–18 season to the AHL to play with affiliate, the Chicago Wolves. Selected as an alternate captain, he was used in a top-line role. Tynan placed second to Teemu Pulkkinen in scoring with Chicago, posting 15 goals and 60 points in 70 games.

In the following 2018–19 season, Tynan continued as a staple of the Wolves attack, producing at a point-per-game through 71 regular season appearances and collecting a league leading 59 assists. He added 2 goals and 13 points in 22 post-season games, helping the Chicago Wolves to the Calder Cup Finals, before losing to the Charlotte Checkers.

As a free agent from the Golden Knights, Tynan agreed to one-year, two-way $700,000 contract with the Colorado Avalanche on July 1, 2019. After attending his first training camp with the Avalanche, Tynan was among the last cuts re-assigned to begin the 2019–20 season with AHL affiliate, the Colorado Eagles. Signed to add offensive depth to the organization, Tynan led the Eagles to start the campaign posting 12 points in 10 games before he was recalled to the NHL by Avalanche on November 6, 2019. Returning to the NHL for the first time since March 2017, Tynan re-united with head coach Jared Bednar from their Calder Cup winning tenure with the Cleveland Monsters. He made his Avalanche debut in a 9–4 victory over the Nashville Predators on November 7, 2019.

At the conclusion of his contract with the Avalanche, Tynan left as a free agent to sign a one-year, two-way contract with the Los Angeles Kings on July 28, 2021.

Tynan remained with the Kings for three seasons, primarily playing with the Kings’ AHL affiliate, the Ontario Reign, where he led the club in scoring every year. He recorded a team-best 57 assists and 66 points in 71 games during the 2023–24 campaign and paced the AHL in assists for the third straight season.

Following two years as the Reign captain, Tynan left the Kings as a free agent and returned to the Colorado Avalanche organization after in signing a one-year, two-way contract on July 1, 2024.

Returning with the Avalanche organization for the 2025–26 season, Tynan appeared in 67 games posting 50 points for the Colorado Eagles. He added another 14 points (2g, 12a) in 17 Calder Cup Playoff games as the Eagles advanced to Game 7 of the Western Conference Finals.

As a free agent from the Avalanche, concluding his second tenure with the club, Tynan opted to continue his career in the AHL by agreeing to return to Springfield in signing a one-year contract with the Thunderbirds on July 2, 2026.

== Career statistics ==
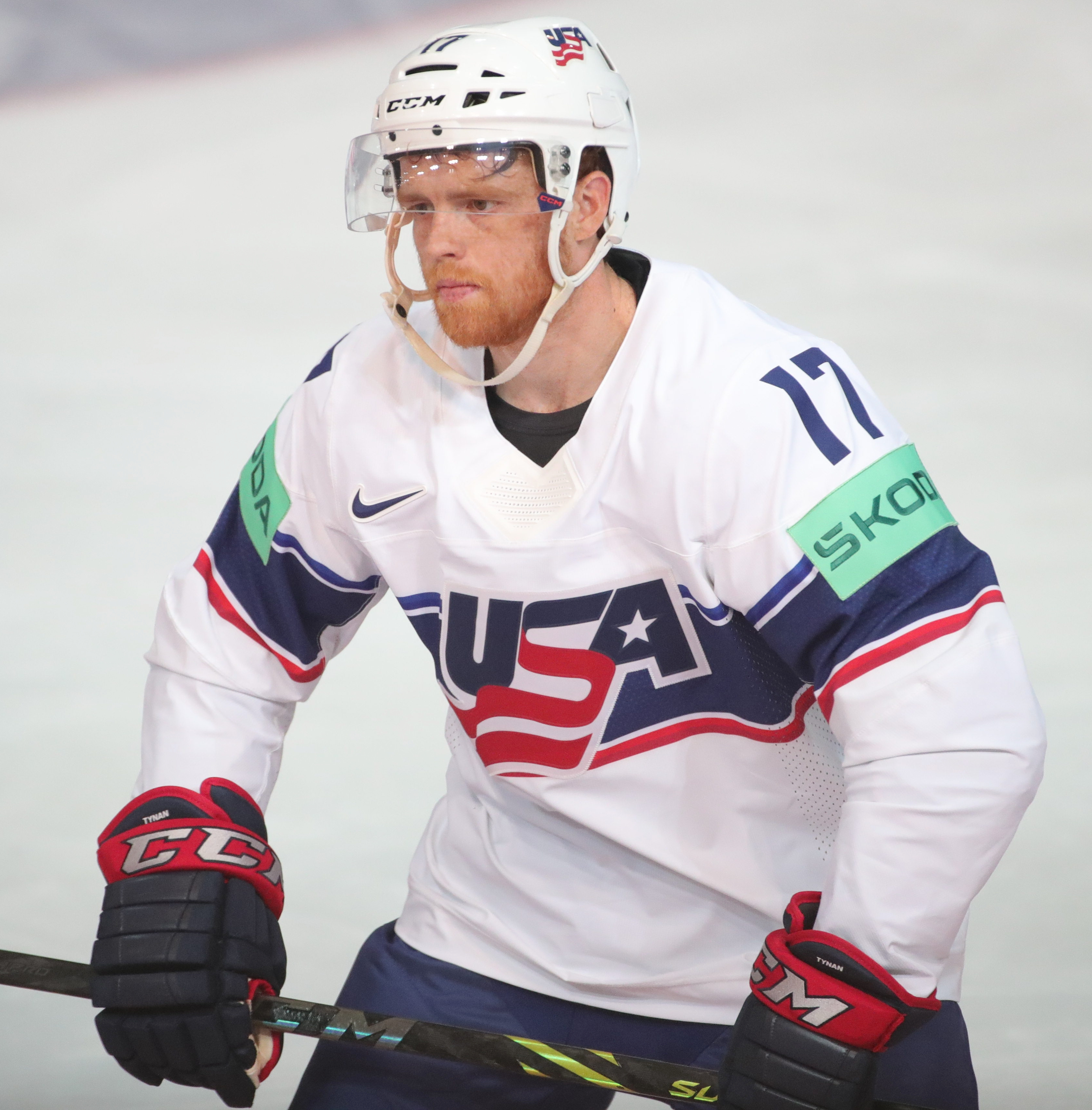
Tynan playing for the United States in the 2023 World Championship

=== Regular season and playoffs ===
			Regular season					Playoffs
Season	Team	League	GP	G	A	Pts	PIM	GP	G	A	Pts	PIM
2009–10	Des Moines Buccaneers	USHL	60	17	55	72	55	—	—	—	—	—
2010–11	U. of Notre Dame	CCHA	44	23	31	54	36	—	—	—	—	—
2011–12	U. of Notre Dame	CCHA	39	13	28	41	38	—	—	—	—	—
2012–13	U. of Notre Dame	CCHA	41	10	18	28	28	—	—	—	—	—
2013–14	U. of Notre Dame	HE	40	8	30	38	30	—	—	—	—	—
2013–14	Springfield Falcons	AHL	3	0	0	0	2	—	—	—	—	—
2014–15	Springfield Falcons	AHL	75	13	35	48	48	—	—	—	—	—
2015–16	Lake Erie Monsters	AHL	76	6	40	46	38	17	1	5	6	8
2016–17	Cleveland Monsters	AHL	72	12	29	41	34	—	—	—	—	—
2016–17	Columbus Blue Jackets	NHL	3	0	0	0	0	—	—	—	—	—
2017–18	Chicago Wolves	AHL	70	15	45	60	30	3	0	2	2	2
2018–19	Chicago Wolves	AHL	71	12	59	71	28	22	2	11	13	10
2019–20	Colorado Eagles	AHL	42	5	42	47	20	—	—	—	—	—
2019–20	Colorado Avalanche	NHL	16	0	1	1	2	—	—	—	—	—
2020–21	Colorado Eagles	AHL	27	8	27	35	12	2	1	2	3	0
2021–22	Ontario Reign	AHL	62	14	84	98	18	5	1	2	3	16
2021–22	Los Angeles Kings	NHL	2	0	0	0	0	—	—	—	—	—
2022–23	Ontario Reign	AHL	72	8	73	81	44	2	0	1	1	2
2023–24	Ontario Reign	AHL	71	9	57	66	68	8	2	5	7	4
2024–25	Colorado Eagles	AHL	52	8	41	49	74	9	0	2	2	2
2024–25	Colorado Avalanche	NHL	9	0	1	1	4	—	—	—	—	—
2025–26	Colorado Eagles	AHL	67	3	47	50	42	17	2	12	14	14
2025–26	Colorado Avalanche	NHL	1	0	0	0	0	—	—	—	—	—
NHL totals			31	0	2	2	6	—	—	—	—	—

=== International ===
Year	Team	Event	Result	GP	G	A	Pts	PIM
2012	United States	WJC	7th	6	1	3	4	2
2022	United States	WC	4th	6	0	5	5	2
2023	United States	WC	4th	10	1	10	11	0
Junior totals				6	1	3	4	2
Senior totals				16	1	15	16	2

== Awards and honors ==
Awards	Year	Ref
College
All-CCHA Rookie Team	2010–11	
CCHA Rookie of the Year	2011	
Tim Taylor Award	2011	
All-CCHA Second Team	2011	
All-CCHA First Team	2011–12	
CCHA All-Tournament Team	2013	
AHL
Calder Cup champion	2016	
All-Star Game	2020	
Pacific Division All-Star Team	2021	
Les Cunningham Award	2021, 2022	
First All-Star Team	2022	
Second All-Star Team	2023	

Awards and achievements
Preceded by Andy Taranto	CCHA Rookie of the Year; 2010–11	Succeeded by Alex Guptill
Preceded by Stéphane Da Costa	NCAA Ice Hockey National Rookie of the Year; 2010–11	Succeeded by Joey LaLeggia
Preceded by Frank Slubowski	CCHA Most Valuable Player in Tournament; 2013	Succeeded by Award discontinued
