= Moritz Seider =

German ice hockey player (born 2001)

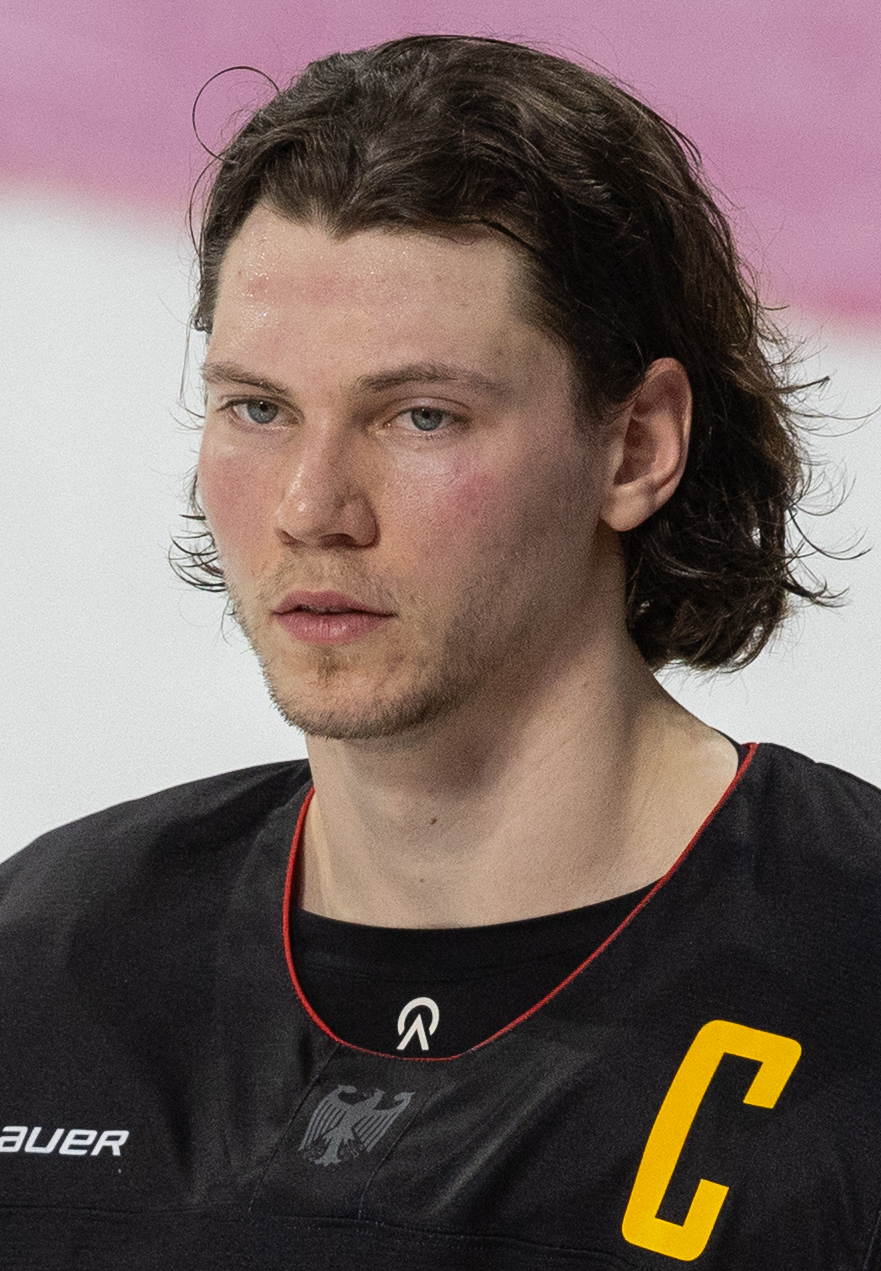
- Seider with Germany in 2026
- Born: 6 April 2001 (age 25) Zell, Germany
- Height: 6 ft 4 in (193 cm)
- Weight: 210 lb (95 kg; 15 st 0 lb)
- Position: Defence
- Shoots: Right
- NHL team Former teams: Detroit Red Wings; Adler Mannheim; Rögle BK
- National team: Germany
- NHL draft: 6th overall, 2019; Detroit Red Wings
- Playing career: 2018–present

Moritz Seider (German: [ˈmoːʁɪts ˈzaɪdɐ]; born 6 April 2001) is a German professional ice hockey player who is a defenceman and alternate captain for the Detroit Red Wings of the National Hockey League (NHL). He was drafted sixth overall by the Red Wings in the 2019 NHL entry draft.

== Playing career ==
A top prospect for the 2019 NHL entry draft, he was tabbed as "the best German defense prospect since Christian Ehrhoff" by The Hockey Writers. On 21 June 2019, he was selected in the first round, sixth overall, by the Detroit Red Wings. On 14 July, he signed a three-year, entry-level contract with the Red Wings.

On 4 August 2020, Seider was loaned to his original club, Adler Mannheim of the Deutsche Eishockey Liga (DEL), to begin the 2020–21 season due to the delayed North American season as a consequence of the COVID-19 pandemic. On 8 October, with no start date for the DEL in sight, the Red Wings terminated his loan with Mannheim. It was announced on the same day that he would instead be loaned to Rögle BK of the Swedish Hockey League (SHL) for the remainder of the season, joining former Adler Mannheim teammate Ben Smith. After the 2020–21 season, Seider was named the SHL defenceman of the year.

Seider made the Red Wings opening day roster out of training camp to start the 2021–22 NHL season. Seider was named the NHL Rookie of the Month for October 2021 after recording eight points in nine games. On 6 November 2021, Seider scored his first NHL goal, in overtime against Buffalo Sabres goaltender Dustin Tokarski in a 4–3 Red Wings win. Seider scored seven goals and 43 assists during his first season with the Red Wings. He led first-year defencemen in assists, points, power-play points, game-winning goals and shots on goal, and ranked second in goals. On 21 June 2022, he was announced as the winner of the Calder Memorial Trophy, awarded to the player deemed the most proficient in his first year of competition in the NHL.

Moritz Seider with the Red Wings in November 2026

== International play ==
Medal record

Men's ice hockey

Representing Germany

World Championships
Silver medal – second place	2023 Finland/Latvia	

At the 2019 World Junior Championship Division IA tournament, Seider led all defencemen in scoring, captaining Germany junior team to a first-place finish and promotion to the top division of the following year's tournament, where he once again served as captain. He would opt not to participate in the 2021 tournament, deciding instead to stay with Rögle BK. At the 2021 IIHF World Championship, Seider was given the IIHF directorate's award for Best Defenceman, and was named to the Media All-Star Team.

In October 2021, Seider was named as one of three provisional players for Germany's Olympic roster for the 2022 Winter Olympics, alongside Leon Draisaitl and Philipp Grubauer. However, the NHL ultimately decided against its players participating in the tournament.

Seider initially declined to join the national team for the 2023 IIHF World Championship, but reconsidered in time to help lead them on an unexpected deep run through the knockout round, defeating the heavily-favoured United States senior team in the semifinal to reach the gold medal game. Seider set up teammate JJ Peterka's opening goal of the game, but Germany was ultimately defeated by Canada senior team, winning the silver medal, the nation's first at the World Championships since 1953. For the second time, Seider was named to the Media All-Star Team.

== Career statistics ==
=== Regular season and playoffs ===
			Regular season					Playoffs
Season	Team	League	GP	G	A	Pts	PIM	GP	G	A	Pts	PIM
2016–17	Jungadler Mannheim	DNL	22	4	8	12	18	4	0	1	1	0
2017–18	Jungadler Mannheim	DNL	14	6	7	13	2	—	—	—	—	—
2017–18	Adler Mannheim	DEL	4	0	0	0	0	—	—	—	—	—
2018–19	Adler Mannheim	DEL	29	2	4	6	8	14	0	5	5	0
2019–20	Grand Rapids Griffins	AHL	49	2	20	22	28	—	—	—	—	—
2020–21	Rögle BK	SHL	41	7	21	28	16	13	1	4	5	8
2021–22	Detroit Red Wings	NHL	82	7	43	50	34	—	—	—	—	—
2022–23	Detroit Red Wings	NHL	82	5	37	42	40	—	—	—	—	—
2023–24	Detroit Red Wings	NHL	82	9	33	42	51	—	—	—	—	—
2024–25	Detroit Red Wings	NHL	82	8	38	46	40	—	—	—	—	—
2025–26	Detroit Red Wings	NHL	82	10	50	60	57	—	—	—	—	—
DEL totals			33	2	4	6	8	14	0	5	5	0
SHL totals			41	7	21	28	16	13	1	4	5	8
NHL totals			410	39	201	240	222	—	—	—	—	—

=== International ===
Year	Team	Event	Result	GP	G	A	Pts	PIM
2017	Germany	U18-D1	15th	5	0	1	1	0
2018	Germany	WJC-D1	13th	5	1	0	1	4
2018	Germany	U18-D1	12th	5	0	3	3	6
2019	Germany	WJC-D1	11th	5	1	6	7	4
2019	Germany	WC	6th	5	2	0	2	2
2020	Germany	WJC	9th	7	0	6	6	6
2021	Germany	WC	4th	10	0	5	5	6
2022	Germany	WC	7th	8	2	5	7	0
2023	Germany	WC	2nd place, silver medalist(s)	10	1	4	5	31
2025	Germany	WC	9th	7	0	1	1	4
2026	Germany	OG	6th	5	0	2	2	0
2026	Germany	WC	10th	7	1	4	5	2
Junior totals				27	2	16	18	20
Senior totals				52	6	21	27	45

== Awards and honours ==
Award	Year	Ref
DEL
DEL Champion	2019	
Rookie of the Year	2019	
SHL
SHL Defenceman of the Year	2021	
NHL
Calder Memorial Trophy	2022	
NHL All-Rookie Team	2022	
International
World Championship Best Defenceman	2021	
World Championship Media All-Star Team	2021, 2023	

Awards and achievements
Preceded by Joe Veleno	Detroit Red Wings first-round draft pick 2019	Succeeded by Lucas Raymond
Preceded by Kirill Kaprizov	Winner of the Calder Memorial Trophy; 2022	Succeeded by Matty Beniers
