= Sebastian Ylönen =

French-Finnish ice hockey player

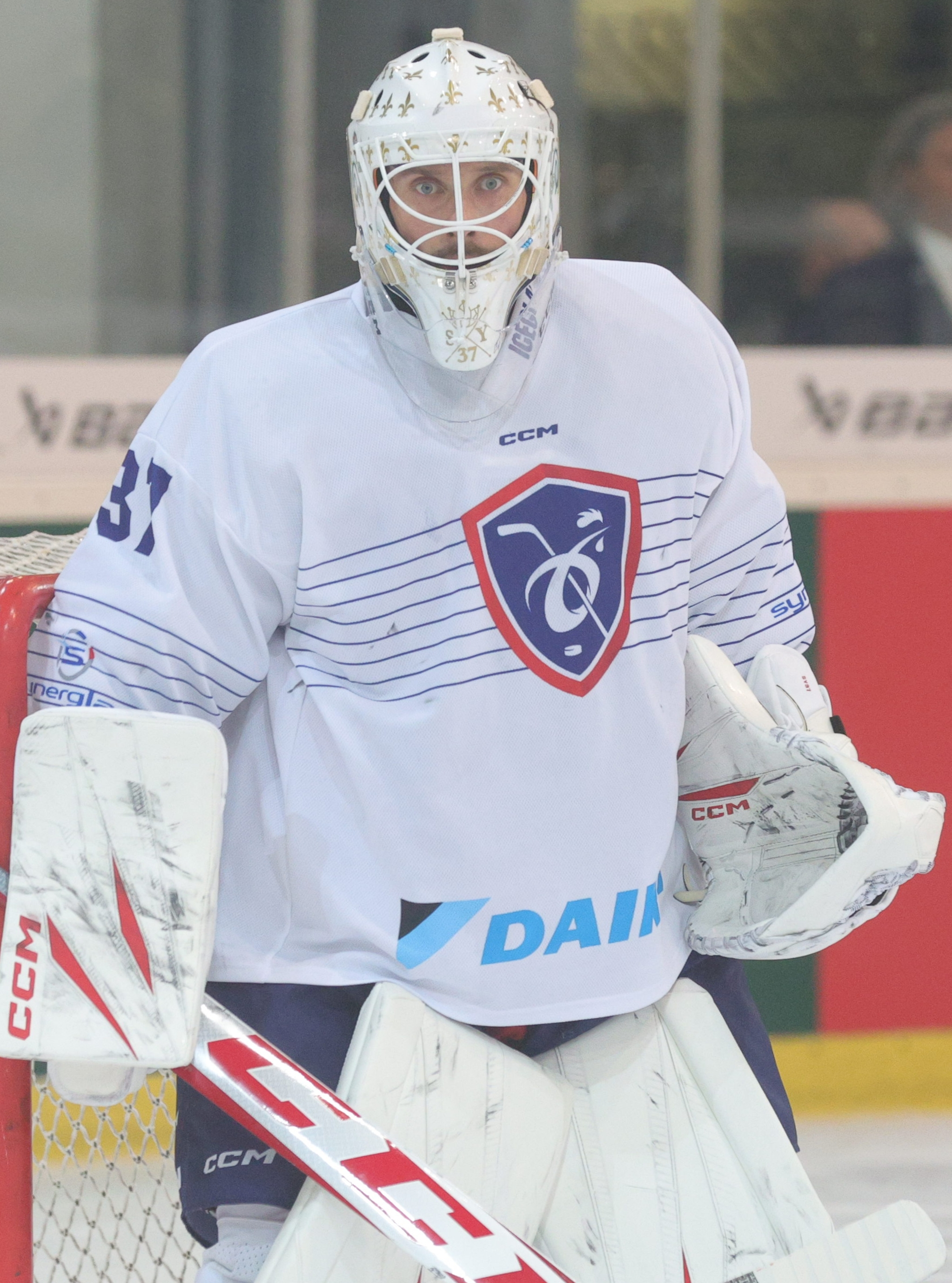
- Born: 3 July 1991 (age 34) Rouen, France
- Height: 1.86 m (6 ft 1 in)
- Weight: 82 kg (181 lb; 12 st 13 lb)
- Position: Goaltender
- Catches: Left
- LM team Former teams: Jokers de Cergy-Pontoise; Gothiques d'Amiens; Dragons de Rouen; Boxers de Bordeaux; Lukko; Anglet Hormadi Élite; Rapaces de Gap
- National team: France
- NHL draft: Undrafted
- Playing career: 2009–present

Sebastian Ylönen (born 3 July 1991) is a French-Finnish ice hockey goaltender for the Jokers de Cergy-Pontoise and the French national team.

He represented France at the 2019 IIHF World Championship. Ylönen also holds Finnish citizenship.

== Early life ==
Ylönen was born in Rouen, France, to a Finnish father and a French mother. His father is the former ice hockey player Petri Ylönen.
