= 2023 IIHF World Championship =

2023 edition of the IIHF World Championship

Tournament details
- Host countries: Finland; Latvia
- Venues: 2 (in 2 host cities)
- Dates: 12–28 May
- Opened by: Sauli Niinistö
- Teams: 16

Final positions
- Champions: Canada (28th title)
- Runners-up: Germany
- Third place: Latvia
- Fourth place: United States

Tournament statistics
- Games played: 64
- Goals scored: 354 (5.53 per game)
- Attendance: 442,160 (6,909 per game)
- Scoring leader: (United States) Rocco Grimaldi (14 points)

Awards
- MVP: (Latvia) Artūrs Šilovs

The 2023 IIHF World Championship was co-hosted by Tampere, Finland, and Riga, Latvia. The tournament was held from 12 to 28 May 2023, organized by the International Ice Hockey Federation (IIHF).

Canada won its record-breaking 28th title by beating Germany 5–2 in the final. The silver was Germany's first medal since 1953. Latvia claimed its first IIHF medal after defeating the USA 4–3 in overtime and finishing third.

As in the 2022 edition, the tournament saw several upsets: Kazakhstan's win over Norway, Hungary's win over France, Latvia's first victory over Czechia, Norway’s second win over Canada, as well as Kazakhstan's first victory over Slovakia. The playoffs also saw major upsets, as Latvia reached the semi-finals for the first time after defeating favourite Sweden 3–1 in the quarter-finals, Germany upset Switzerland 3–1 and the reigning Olympic and World Champion Finland lost to Canada 4–1. Czechia finished in 8th place after losing to the United States (USA) 3–0 in the quarter-finals, which is that nation's worst placement to date in the history of the World Championship. Germany reached the final for the first time since 1930 after upsetting the fourth-seeded USA 4–3 in overtime.

== Host nation bid ==
The event was originally planned to be held in Saint Petersburg, Russia, but, in February 2022, the International Olympic Committee (IOC) called for Russia and Belarus to be stripped of hosting rights to all international sporting events due to the Russian invasion of Ukraine. On 26 April 2022, Russia lost their rights to host the World Championship.

After being promoted to the top division, Slovenia and Hungary bid to co-host the event in Ljubljana and Budapest. The bid was withdrawn due to Hungarian Ice Hockey Federation informing the IIHF that it did not receive the governmental guarantees to host. Finland and Latvia submitted a joint bid, with Nokia Arena in Tampere and Arena Riga in Riga as potential host venues. On 27 May 2022, the IIHF confirmed that Finland and Latvia would host the tournament, with Finland having also hosted the 2022 IIHF World Championship in Tampere (Nokia Arena) and Helsinki (Helsinki Ice Hall).

== Venues ==
Finland	2023 IIHF World Championship is located in Scandinavia	Latvia
Tampere	2023 IIHF World Championship is located in Scandinavia	Riga
Nokia Arena; Capacity: 13,455	2023 IIHF World Championship is located in Scandinavia	Arena Riga; Capacity: 10,300

== Participants ==
Qualified as hosts

- Finland
- Latvia

Automatic qualifier after a top 14 placement at the 2022 IIHF World Championship

- Austria
- Canada
- Czechia
- Denmark
- France
- Germany
- Kazakhstan
- Norway
- Slovakia
- Sweden
- Switzerland
- United States

Qualified through winning promotion at the 2022 IIHF World Championship Division I

- Hungary
- Slovenia

== Seeding ==
The seedings in the preliminary round are based on the 2022 IIHF World Ranking, as of the end of the 2022 IIHF World Championship, using the serpentine system while allowing the organizer, "to allocate a maximum of two teams to separate groups."

Group A (Tampere)

- Finland (1)
- United States (4)
- Sweden (5)
- Germany (9)
- Denmark (10)
- France (13)
- Austria (15)
- Hungary (20)

Group B (Riga)

- Canada (2)
- Czechia (6)
- Switzerland (7)
- Slovakia (8)
- Latvia (11)
- Norway (12)
- Kazakhstan (16)
- Slovenia (19)

== Rosters ==
Each team's roster consists of at least 15 skaters (forwards, and defencemen) and 2 goaltenders, and at most 22 skaters and 3 goaltenders. All 16 participating nations, through the confirmation of their respective national associations, have to submit a "Long List" no later than two weeks before the tournament, and a final roster by the Passport Control meeting prior to the start of the tournament.

== Match officials ==
16 referees and linesmen were announced on 6 April 2023.

Referees	Linesmen
(Canada) Adam Bloski; (Canada) Mike Langin; (Czech Republic) Jan Hribik; (Denmark) Mads Frandsen; (Finland) Lassi Heikkinen; (Finland) Mikko Kaukokari; (United Kingdom) Liam Sewell; (Germany) Sirko Hunnius; (Germany) André Schrader; (Latvia) Andris Ansons; (Sweden) Tobias Björk; (Sweden) Christoffer Holm; (Switzerland) Stefan Hürlimann; (Slovakia) Miroslav Štolc; (United States) Sean Fernandez; (United States) Sean MacFarlane	(Austria) David Nothegger; (Canada) Brett Mackey; (Canada) Tarrington Wyonzek; (Czech Republic) Daniel Hynek; (Czech Republic) Jiří Ondráček; (Denmark) Andreas Krøyer; (Finland) Onni Hautamäki; (Finland) Tommi Niittylä; (France) Nicolas Constantineau; (Germany) Andreas Hofer; (Latvia) Dāvis Zunde; (Slovakia) Šimon Synek; (Sweden) Emil Yletyinen; (Switzerland) Eric Cattaneo; (United States) Nick Briganti; (United States) Jake Davis

== Preliminary round ==
The groups were announced on 29 May 2022, with the schedule being revealed on 8 September 2022.

=== Group A ===
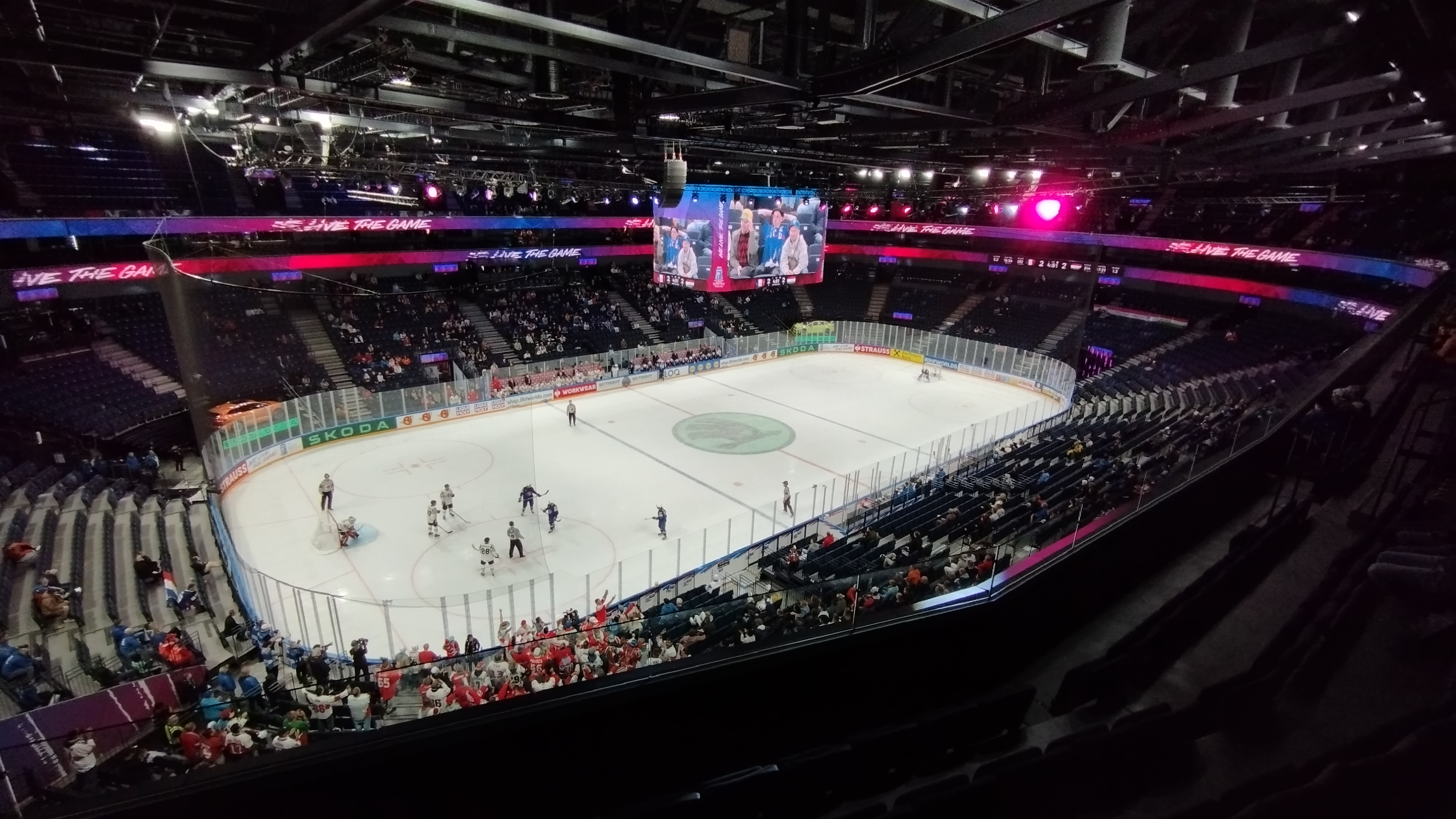
A game between France and Hungary in Nokia Arena

Pos	Team	Pld	W	OTW	OTL	L	GF	GA	GD	Pts	Qualification or relegation
1	United States	7	6	1	0	0	34	8	+26	20	Quarterfinals
2	Sweden	7	5	1	1	0	26	7	+19	18	Quarterfinals
3	Finland (H)	7	5	0	1	1	28	15	+13	16	Quarterfinals
4	Germany	7	4	0	0	3	27	16	+11	12	Quarterfinals
5	Denmark	7	2	1	0	4	19	26	−7	8	Qualification for 2024 IIHF World Championship
6	France	7	0	1	2	4	10	31	−21	4	Qualification for 2024 IIHF World Championship
7	Austria	7	0	1	1	5	11	27	−16	3 (Note: Austria 4–3 Hungary)	Qualification for 2024 IIHF World Championship
8	Hungary	7	0	1	1	5	12	37	−25	3	Relegation to 2024 Division I A

Source: IIHF
Rules for classification: 1) points; 2) head-to-head points; 3) head-to-head goal difference; 4) head-to-head number of goals scored; 5) result against closest best-ranked team outside tied teams; 6) result against second-best-ranked team outside tied teams; 7) seeding before tournament
(H) Host
Notes:

12 May 2023
Finland	1–4	United States
Sweden	1–0	Germany
13 May 2023
France	2–1 (OT)	Austria
Hungary	1–3	Denmark
Germany	3–4	Finland
14 May 2023
United States	7–1	Hungary
France	3–4 (OT)	Denmark
Sweden	5–0	Austria
15 May 2023
Germany	2–3	United States
Finland	1–2 (GWS)	Sweden
16 May 2023
Denmark	6–2	Austria
France	2–3 (OT)	Hungary
17 May 2023
United States	4–1	Austria
Finland	5–3	France
18 May 2023
Hungary	1–7	Sweden
Denmark	4–6	Germany
19 May 2023
Hungary	1–7	Finland
Austria	2–4	Germany
20 May 2023
United States	3–0	Denmark
Austria	1–3	Finland
Sweden	4–0	France
21 May 2023
Germany	7–2	Hungary
United States	9–0	France
22 May 2023
Denmark	1–4	Sweden
Austria	4–3 (GWS)	Hungary
23 May 2023
Germany	5–0	France
Sweden	3–4 (OT)	United States
Finland	7–1	Denmark

=== Group B ===
Watching hockey in Dome Square, Riga

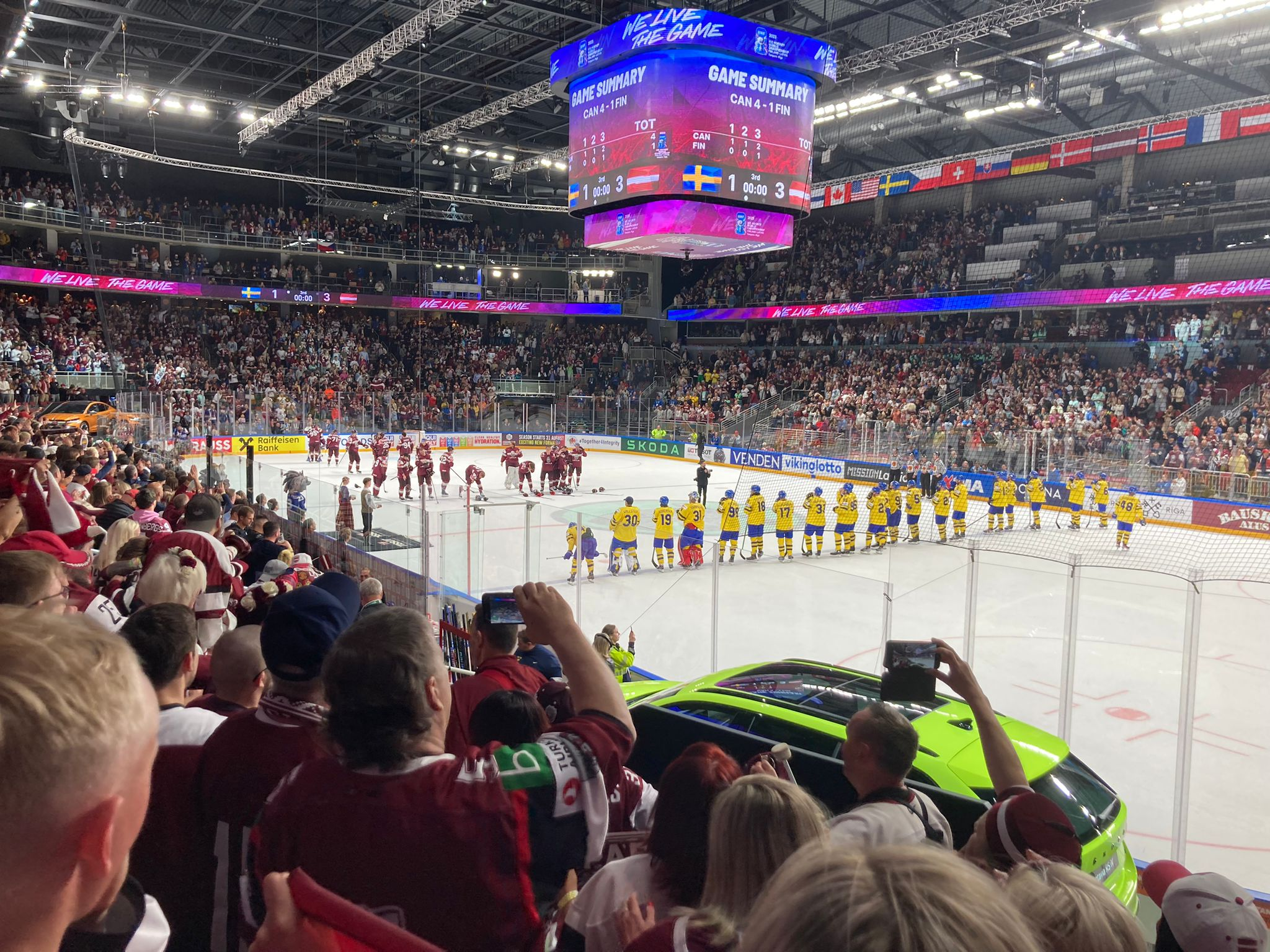
Postgame between Sweden and Latvia in Arena Riga

Pos	Team	Pld	W	OTW	OTL	L	GF	GA	GD	Pts	Qualification or relegation
1	Switzerland	7	6	0	1	0	29	10	+19	19	Quarterfinals
2	Canada	7	4	1	1	1	25	11	+14	15	Quarterfinals
3	Latvia (H)	7	3	2	0	2	21	17	+4	13 (Note: Czechia 3–4 (OT) Latvia)	Quarterfinals
4	Czechia	7	4	0	1	2	22	16	+6	13	Quarterfinals
5	Slovakia	7	3	0	2	2	15	15	0	11	Qualification for 2024 IIHF World Championship
6	Kazakhstan	7	1	2	0	4	14	31	−17	7	Qualification for 2024 IIHF World Championship
7	Norway	7	1	1	1	4	9	17	−8	6	Qualification for 2024 IIHF World Championship
8	Slovenia	7	0	0	0	7	9	27	−18	0	Relegation to 2024 Division I A

Source: IIHF
Rules for classification: 1) points; 2) head-to-head points; 3) head-to-head goal difference; 4) head-to-head number of goals scored; 5) result against closest best-ranked team outside tied teams; 6) result against second-best-ranked team outside tied teams; 7) seeding before tournament
(H) Host
Notes:

12 May 2023
Slovakia	2–3	Czechia
Latvia	0–6	Canada
13 May 2023
Switzerland	7–0	Slovenia
Norway	3–4 (GWS)	Kazakhstan
Slovakia	2–1	Latvia
14 May 2023
Slovenia	2–5	Canada
Norway	0–3	Switzerland
Czechia	5–1	Kazakhstan
15 May 2023
Slovakia	1–2 (GWS)	Canada
Czechia	3–4 (OT)	Latvia
16 May 2023
Slovenia	0–1	Norway
Switzerland	5–0	Kazakhstan
17 May 2023
Latvia	2–1	Norway
Canada	5–1	Kazakhstan
18 May 2023
Czechia	6–2	Slovenia
Switzerland	4–2	Slovakia
19 May 2023
Latvia	3–2	Slovenia
Kazakhstan	4–3 (GWS)	Slovakia
20 May 2023
Norway	0–2	Czechia
Canada	2–3	Switzerland
Kazakhstan	0–7	Latvia
21 May 2023
Slovenia	0–1	Slovakia
Czechia	2–4	Switzerland
22 May 2023
Canada	2–3 (GWS)	Norway
Kazakhstan	4–3	Slovenia
23 May 2023
Slovakia	4–1	Norway
Canada	3–1	Czechia
Switzerland	3–4 (OT)	Latvia

== Playoff round ==
There was a re-seeding after the quarter-finals. If Finland and Latvia were to play in the quarter-finals, there would have been no cross-over for the quarter-finals.

Quarter-finals
25 May
1A United States	3
4B Czechia	0
25 May
1B Switzerland	1
4A Germany	3
25 May
2A Sweden	1
3B Latvia	3
25 May
2B Canada	4
3A Finland	1

Semi-finals
27 May
1 United States	3
8 Germany (OT)	4
27 May
4 Canada	4
6 Latvia	2

Final
28 May
8 Germany	2
4 Canada	5
Third place
28 May
1 United States	3
6 Latvia (OT)	4

== Final standings ==
Teams finishing fifth in the preliminary round were ranked ninth and tenth, teams finishing sixth are ranked 11th and 12th, and so on.

Pos	Grp	Team	Pld	W	OTW	OTL	L	GF	GA	GD	Pts	Final result
1	B	Canada	10	7	1	1	1	38	16	+22	24	Champions
2	A	Germany	10	5	1	0	4	36	25	+11	17	Runners-up
3	B	Latvia (H)	10	4	3	0	3	30	25	+5	18	Third place
4	A	United States	10	7	1	2	0	43	16	+27	25	Fourth place
5	B	Switzerland	8	6	0	1	1	30	13	+17	19	Eliminated in Quarter-finals
6	A	Sweden	8	5	1	1	1	27	10	+17	18	Eliminated in Quarter-finals
7	A	Finland (H)	8	5	0	1	2	29	19	+10	16	Eliminated in Quarter-finals
8	B	Czechia	8	4	0	1	3	22	19	+3	13	Eliminated in Quarter-finals
9	B	Slovakia	7	3	0	2	2	15	15	0	11	Eliminated in Group stage
10	A	Denmark	7	2	1	0	4	19	26	−7	8	Eliminated in Group stage
11	B	Kazakhstan	7	1	2	0	4	14	31	−17	7	Eliminated in Group stage
12	A	France	7	0	1	2	4	10	31	−21	4	Eliminated in Group stage
13	B	Norway	7	1	1	1	4	9	17	−8	6	Eliminated in Group stage
14	A	Austria	7	0	1	1	5	11	27	−16	3	Eliminated in Group stage
15	A	Hungary	7	0	1	1	5	12	37	−25	3	Relegated to 2024 IIHF World Championship Division I
16	B	Slovenia	7	0	0	0	7	9	27	−18	0	Relegated to 2024 IIHF World Championship Division I

Source: IIHF
Rules for classification: 1) position in the group; 2) number of points; 3) goal difference; 4) goals scored; 5) seeding before tournament.
(H) Host

== Statistics ==
=== Scoring leaders ===
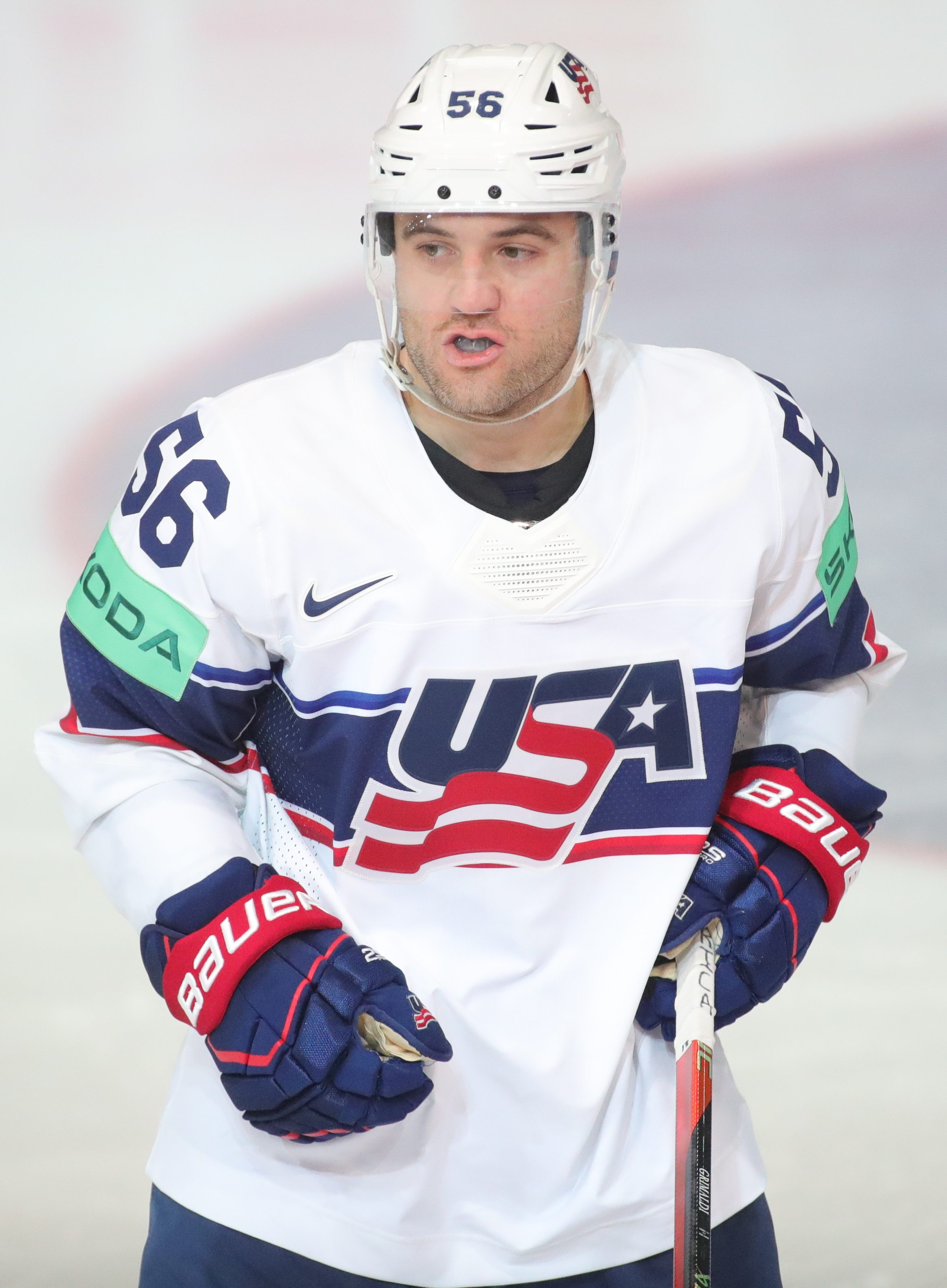
Rocco Grimaldi of the United States led the tournament in scoring with 14 points

List shows the top skaters sorted by points, then goals.

Player	GP	G	A	Pts	+/−	PIM	POS
(United States) Rocco Grimaldi	10	7	7	14	+8	6	F
(Czech Republic) Dominik Kubalík	8	8	4	12	+3	0	F
(Germany) JJ Peterka	10	6	6	12	+8	0	F
(Latvia) Rihards Bukarts	10	3	8	11	+3	8	F
(Canada) MacKenzie Weegar	10	3	8	11	+10	6	D
(United States) T. J. Tynan	10	1	10	11	+10	0	F
(Sweden) Henrik Tömmernes	8	0	10	10	+5	2	D
(United States) Cutter Gauthier	10	7	2	9	+9	2	F
(Canada) Lawson Crouse	10	6	3	9	+9	4	F
(Denmark) Nikolaj Ehlers	7	5	4	9	−3	0	F

GP = Games played; G = Goals; A = Assists; Pts = Points; +/− = Plus/Minus; PIM = Penalties in Minutes; POS = Position
Source: IIHF.com

=== Goaltending leaders ===
Only the top five goaltenders, based on save percentage, who have played at least 40% of their team's minutes, are included in this list.

Player	TOI	GA	GAA	SA	Sv%	SO
(Slovakia) Stanislav Škorvánek	238:39	5	1.26	108	95.37	1
(Czech Republic) Karel Vejmelka	236:26	7	1.78	124	94.35	1
(Canada) Sam Montembeault	423:07	10	1.42	163	93.87	1
(Sweden) Lars Johansson	303:42	8	1.58	120	93.33	2
(Slovakia) Samuel Hlavaj	189:05	7	2.22	103	93.20	0

TOI = time on ice (minutes:seconds); SA = shots against; GA = goals against; GAA = goals against average; Sv% = save percentage; SO = shutouts
Source: IIHF.com

== Awards ==
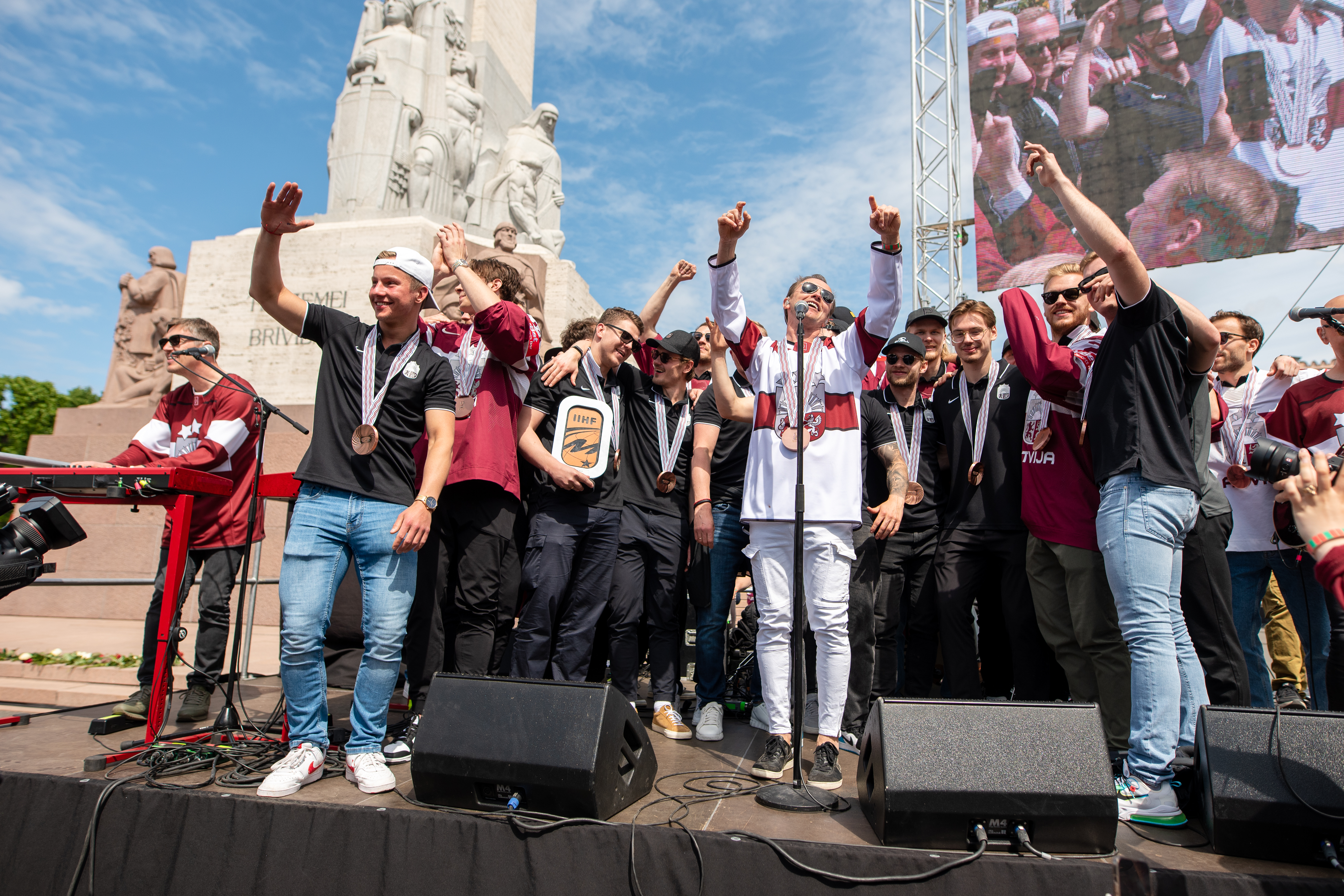
Bronze medal celebration at the foot of the Freedom Monument in Riga

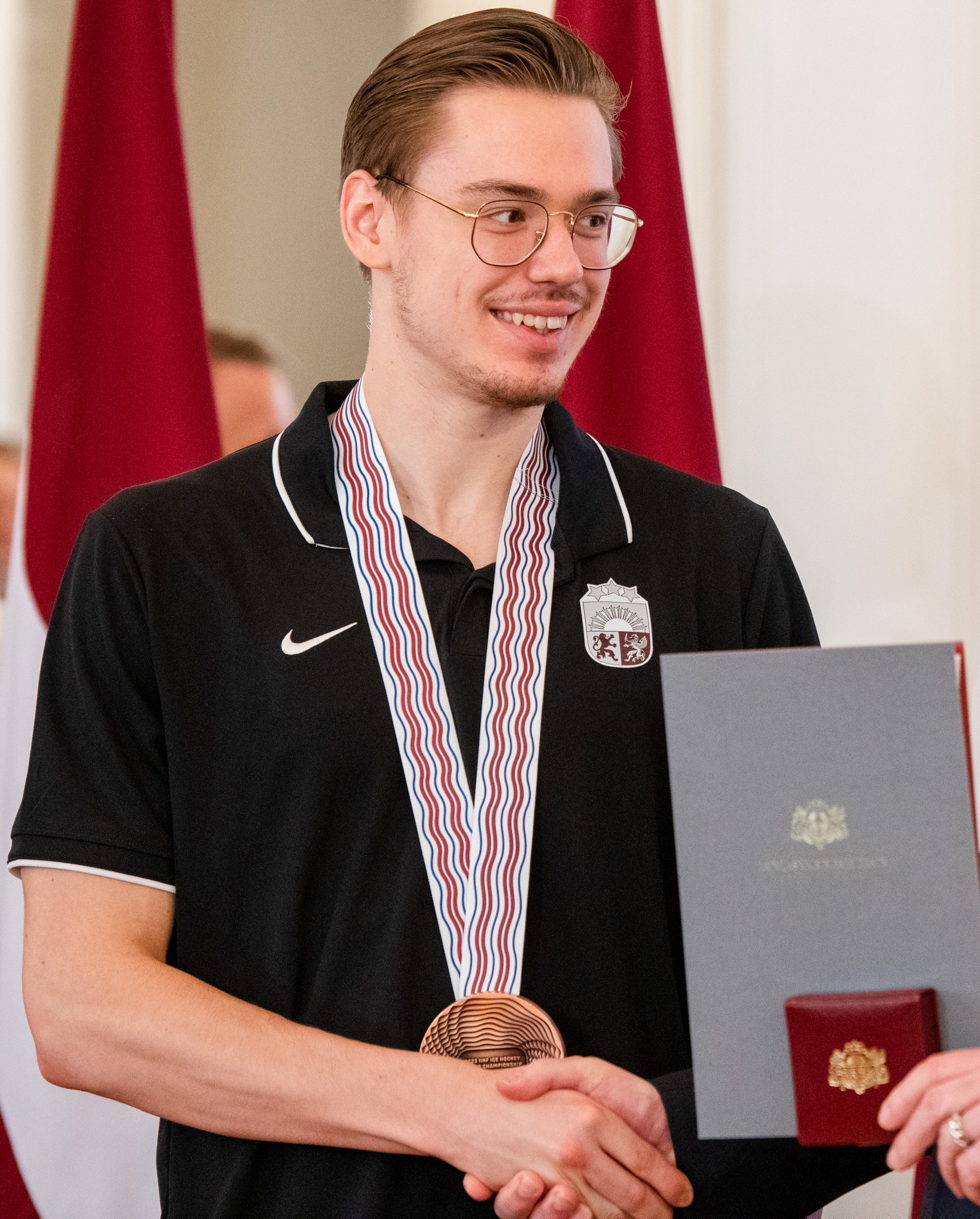
Artūrs Šilovs was named the tournament MVP, best goaltender, and was selected to the tournament all-star team

The awards were announced on 28 May 2023.

=== Individual awards ===
Position	Player
Goaltender	(Latvia) Artūrs Šilovs
Defenceman	(Canada) MacKenzie Weegar
Forward	(Germany) JJ Peterka

=== Media All Stars ===
Position	Player
Goaltender	(Latvia) Artūrs Šilovs
Defenceman	(Canada) MacKenzie Weegar
Defenceman	(Germany) Moritz Seider
Forward	(Germany) JJ Peterka
Forward	(United States) Rocco Grimaldi
Forward	(Czech Republic) Dominik Kubalík
MVP	(Latvia) Artūrs Šilovs

== IIHF honors and awards ==
The IIHF Hall of Fame induction and awards ceremony was held prior to the medal games on 28 May 2023, in Tampere.

IIHF Hall of Fame inductees

- Sandra Dombrowski, Switzerland
- James Foster, Great Britain
- Cristobal Huet, France
- Kalervo Kummola, Finland
- Brian Leetch, United States
- Caroline Ouellette, Canada
- Henrik Zetterberg, Sweden

Award recipients

- Kimmo Leinonen of Finland received the Paul Loicq Award for outstanding contributions to international ice hockey.
- Viktor Szélig of Hungary received the Torriani Award for a player with an outstanding career from non-top hockey nation.

== Broadcasting rights ==
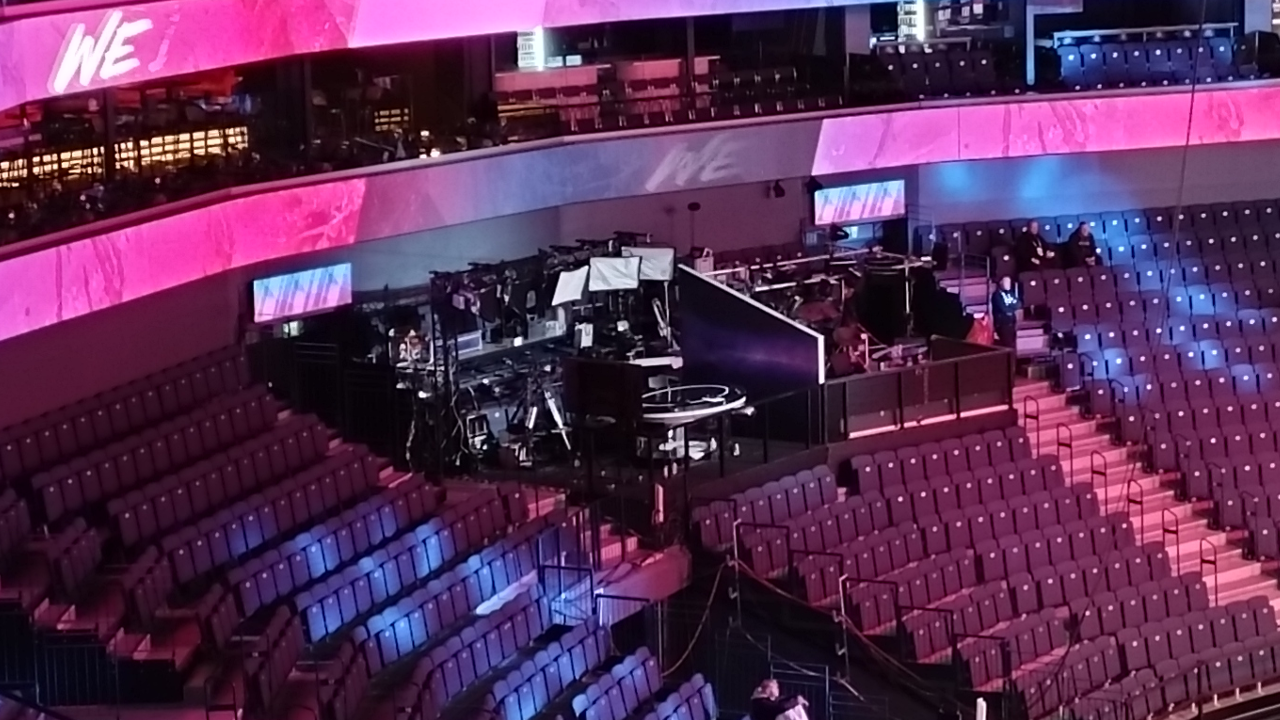
TV studios in Nokia Arena: the Finnish C More (left) and the Swedish SVT (right)

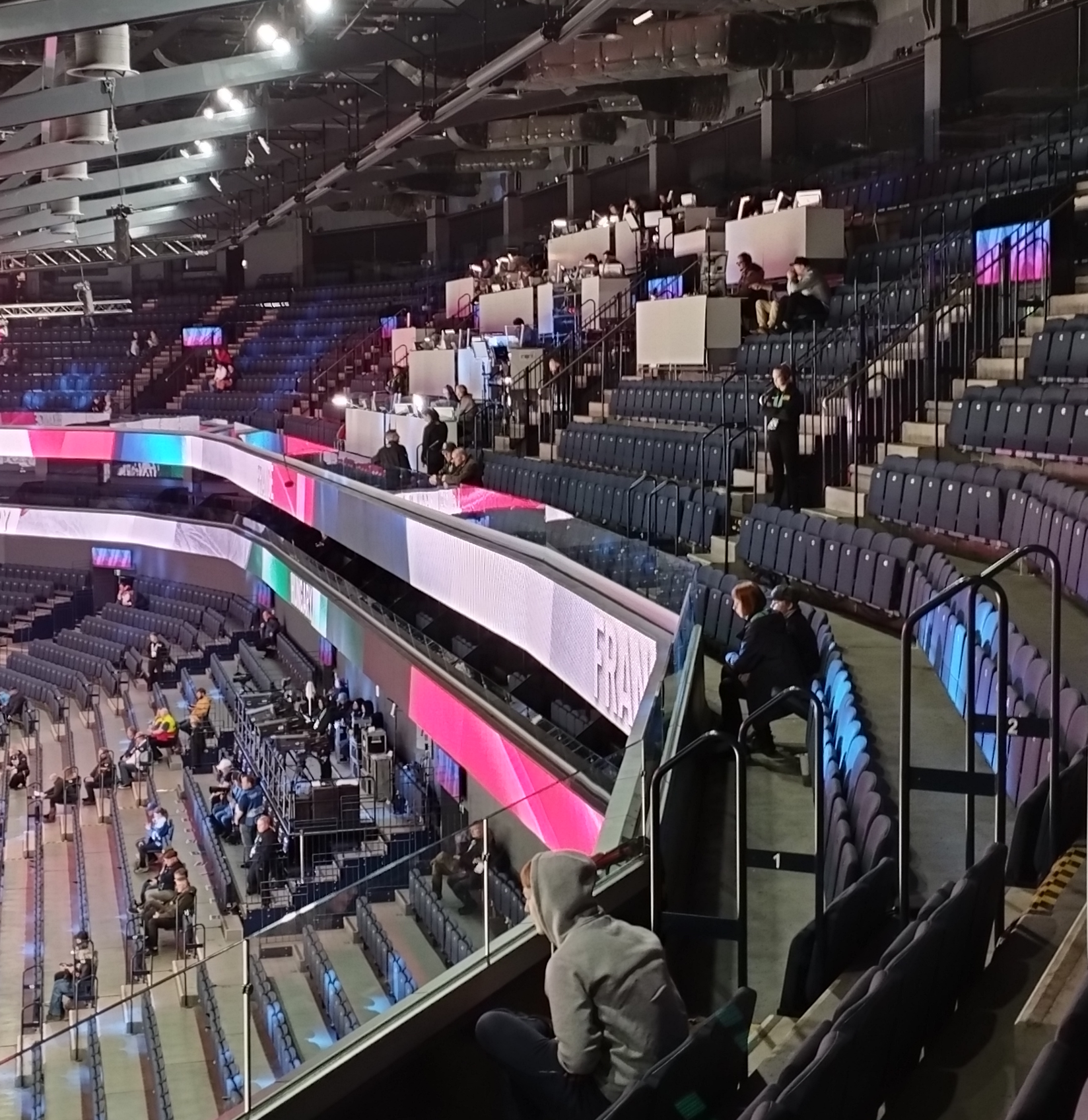
Broadcasting cameras and positions for the commentators in Nokia Arena, Tampere

These are the broadcasters for the tournament.

Country	Broadcaster
Austria	ORF
Canada	TSN
Canada	RDS
Czech Republic	Czech Television
Denmark	TV 2 Sport
Estonia	ERR
Finland	MTV
France	Fanseat
Germany	Sport1
Germany	Magenta Sport
Hungary	Sport 1
Kazakhstan	Qazsport
Latvia	LTV
Latvia	Tet
Lithuania	LRT
Norway	Viaplay
Poland	TVP
Russia	Match TV
Slovakia	RTVS
Slovenia	RTV
Slovenia	Šport TV
Sweden	SVT
Switzerland	SRG SSR
Ukraine	XSPORT
United Kingdom	Viaplay Sports
United States	NHL Network
United States	ESPN+
