= Athlete activism in the United States =

Athletes advocating for social and political issues

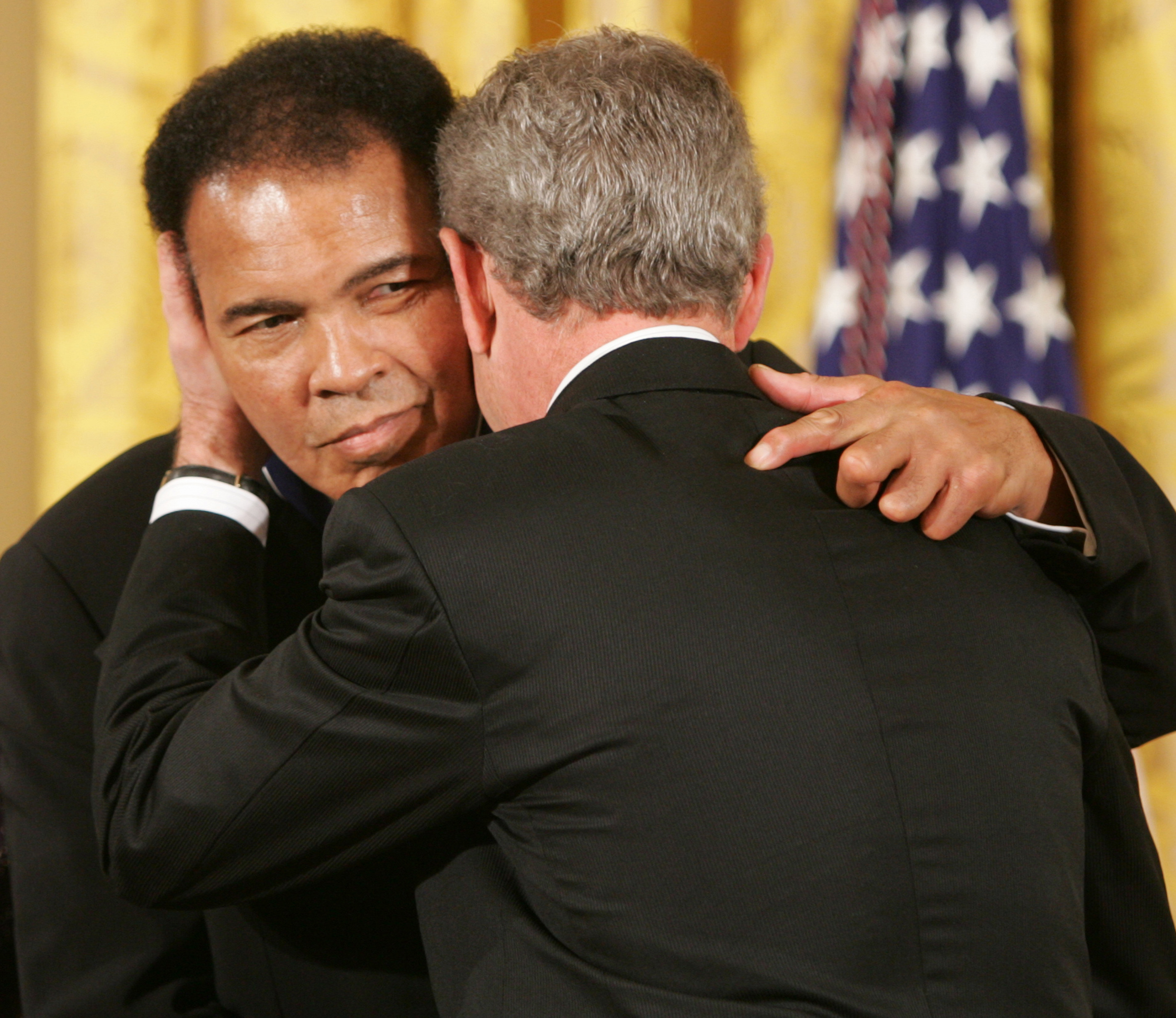
President George W. Bush embraces Ali after presenting him with the Presidential Medal of Freedom in 2005, during ceremonies at the White House.

Athlete activism in the United States refers to using one's platform as a professional athlete to advocate for social and political issues in the United States of America. It has been an aspect of American sports culture for decades, dating back to the civil rights movement of the 1960s, with athletes such as Muhammad Ali and Tommie Smith using their fame to speak out against racism and discrimination. In recent years, athlete activism has gained renewed attention as athletes have used their platforms to address issues such as police brutality, racial inequality, and LGBTQ rights. The intersection of sports and social justice has been a contentious topic, with some praising athletes for using their influence and privilege to bring attention to important issues, while others criticize them for being too "political" or "divisive."

== National Football League ==
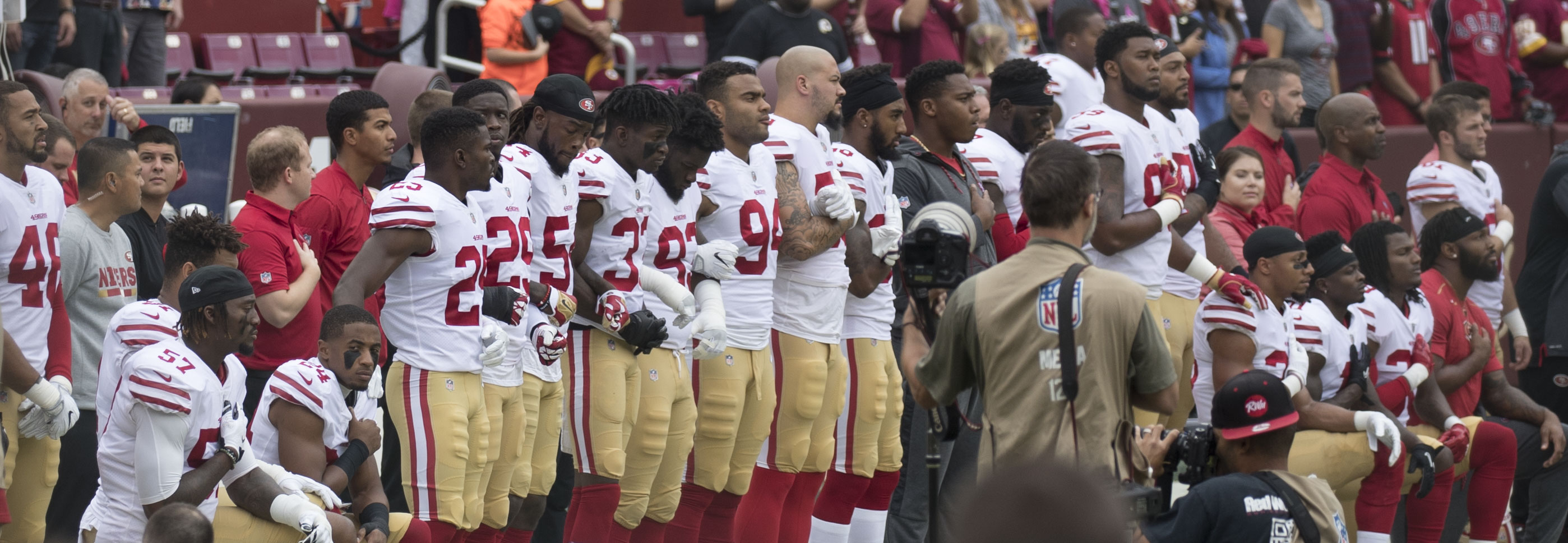
49ers players following in Colin Kaepernick's footsteps in protest for Black Lives Matter

Colin Kaepernick was one of the first activists in the Black Lives Matter movement in the NFL. During the 2016 postseason, in response to several incidents of police brutality, Kaepernick protested during the national anthem. Initially, Kaepernick sat on the bench during the national anthem, but after conferring with other players, he moved to kneeling. Commissioner Roger Goodell responded to the action by saying that he didn't "necessarily agree" with Kaepernick's actions. On the 2016 season's opening day, many players followed his lead, with some kneeling and some raising a fist. These actions garnered criticism from several public figures, including then-President Donald Trump. These protests continued into the 2017 and 2018 seasons, generating controversy. When he went unsigned in free agency, Kaepernick hired attorney Mark Geragos and filed a lawsuit, claiming that NFL owners had conspired against him in violation of their collective bargaining agreement.

Initially, the NFL ruled that players could not protest during the national anthem, but could remain in the locker room. In 2018, the league announced it would not punish players for protests during the national anthem. After the murder of George Floyd, similar protests began to emerge.

== Olympics ==
During the 1968 Olympics, two African-American athletes, Tommie Smith and John Carlos, raised their fists in a salute to Black Power on the podium. The assassination of Martin Luther King Jr, the advancements in the U.S. Civil Rights Movement, and the Tlatelolco massacre were cited as influencing the pair to make this decision. The Olympians wore black t-shirts to cover the USA on their uniforms and raised a black glove in the air as "The Star-Spangled Banner" played. Reactions to the action were largely negative and near-instant. Smith and Carlos were banned from the US team and the Olympic village and ostracized upon returning home. In 2008, President Barack Obama acknowledged the men's protest and asked them to become U.S. Olympic Committee ambassadors in 2016.

Similar protests made a resurgence in the 2022 Beijing Winter Games. Some athletes were unhappy with the International Olympic Committee's decision to place the winter games in China, since the country has a history of human rights violations and censorship. Protests became more subtle, as the IOC had learned from experience with them. From athletes skipping the opening ceremony to some athletes turning away from the flag during the national anthem, the IOC's controversial Rule 50, which prevents all forms of peaceful protest on the podium, has made it riskier for Olympians to make a political statement, as it has led to termination and controversies for those who participate.

== Major League Baseball ==
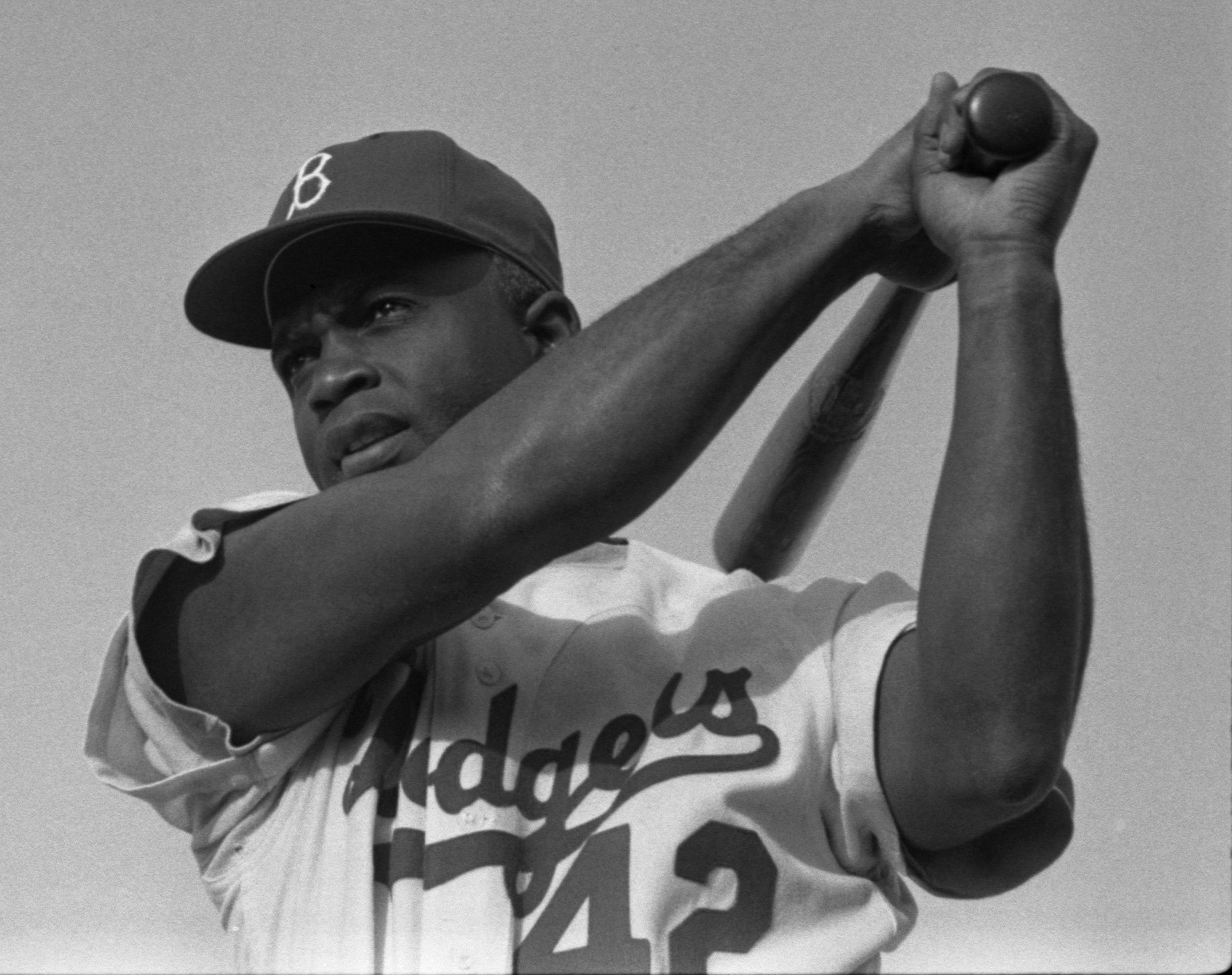
Jackie Robinson was the first Black man to play in the MLB, breaking the racial boundary.

Some athletes in Major League Baseball (MLB) use their platforms for advocacy involving social and political issues. One of the players credited with starting activism within Major League Baseball is Jackie Robinson. Robinson became the first player to break the color barrier in the MLB on April 15, 1947. Once established in the MLB, Robinson found friends, to whom he would communicate his feelings about specific civil rights issues such as lynching or the passing of particular legislation. Although he became frustrated with democracy and the amount of influence the Civil Rights Movement had made during his time, he continued to work for justice throughout his life. Robinson's actions influenced other sports as more African-American athletes began to advocate against social injustice.

Roberto Clemente also advocated while in the MLB. Clemente was the first Latino Hall of Famer in baseball to receive 12 Golden Glove awards, over 3,000 hits, 15 all-star appearances, 2 World Series titles, and the 1966 MVP award. After leaving his home in Puerto Rico to go play in the MLB in 1955, Clemente noticed the segregation and racism within America, as Jim Crow laws were in effect. Clemente began to work against inequality in multiple ways, such as by boycotting bus trips with teammates to “all white” diners during road trips or by forcing the Pittsburgh Pirates general manager to buy station wagons for non-white players to travel in during away games. Former MLB player Carlos Delgado followed in his role model's footsteps by continuing to advocate for minority rights and other issues of social justice. Clemente created a new form of activism against social injustices within the MLB, which has influenced the league.

== National Basketball Association ==
LeBron James, a player in the NBA, has faced racism during his career. Since Kaepernick "took the knee", James has followed in his footsteps, but in his own way and by using his sport. Despite being told to "shut up and dribble", James has continued to be an activist against racism by discussing it on social media and during the pregame of NBA games. His platform allows more people to hear about his activism. At the 2016 ESPYs, James and a few fellow NBA players used the occasion to express their support of the Black Lives Matter Movement. James has used his platform more every year as his popularity has increased.

Michael Jordan is an NBA star who has been criticized for his lack of involvement in social justice issues affecting the Black community for almost his entire career. In 1990, Jordan declined to publicly endorse Democrat Harvey Gantt, a candidate for the US Senate who was running against Jesse Helms, a conservative Republican politician in North Carolina who had opposed Civil Rights and desegregation. When asked about why he refused, he quipped, “Republicans buy sneakers, too.” He claimed to have contributed personally to the campaign, but this quote emphasized Jordan's prioritization of his public image and his sneaker sales over advocating for the Black community. In 1999, Jordan became the president of the Washington Wizards franchise in Washington, D.C., but failed to ever acknowledge the struggling black communities in a recently gentrified city – communities who were suffering from high youth incarceration, low performing schools, and violence. He is also criticized as inspiring the start of the “me” generation of black youth, garnering a culture of wealth, fame, and selfishness instead of concern for the greater good of communities. His iconic shoes, the Air Jordans, incited violence in many Black communities, and despite realizing this and claiming that he would be “reevaluating his message to the public”, Jordan has never made true attempts to combat this. Jordan's lack of activism in his early career led many to believe he was wasting his money and influence on frivolous and selfish matters. Despite this, he recently became more philanthropic, and in 2025 he reached 100 million dollars donated, with some recipients including the NAACP Legal Defense Fund and the Smithsonian's National Museum of African American History and Culture. In recent years, he has been increasingly vocal about social issues as well, speaking out against police brutality and funding voter registration and health clinics.

== National Hockey League ==
The National Hockey League (NHL) has taken part in movements involving anti-racism and LGBTQ+ inclusion. As the National Hockey League has tried to promote these movements, issues have occurred amongst players and teams, causing complications to the activities that the league is attempting to implement.

Beginning in 2020, the NHL and NHLPA (National Hockey League Players Association) announced that they would partner with the Hockey Diversity Alliance (HDA) to administer training and education on anti-racism within the league, which the players and NHLPA staff would partake in. The HDA is attempting to "... eradicate systematic racism and intolerance in hockey" by having its partners and associations sign its pledge, stating their commitment to:

- Create policy and rule changes to make the culture of the game more inclusive
- Establish specific targets for hiring, promoting, and partnering with Black individuals and businesses
- Execute educational programming to increase awareness of racism in hockey
- Fund social justice initiatives

Starting in 2013, the NHL became an official partner of the You Can Play project, which was designed to fight homophobia within sports through events such as Pride Nights, which include jerseys made by members of the LGBTQ+ community, and stadium performances. Similar events and uniforms across multiple sports have begun to receive backlash from players on the teams participating. This has caused the league management to reconsider the effectiveness of these events, as well as their possible discontinuation, due to the pressure of multiple political facets that has caused negative responses to events, which are meant to promote outreach and support for the LBGTQ+ community. Some players from Russia opted out of these events due to political and religious beliefs. Ivan Provorov, a Philadelphia Flyers defensemen, chose to opt out due to his Russian Orthodox beliefs; Kirill Kaprizov, a Minnesota Wild wingman, also chose to opt out due to his difficulty returning home to Russia because of Russia's ban on "gay propaganda" that has begun to evolve into law within the country; the ban is described as "... [prohibiting] sharing positive and even neutral information about lesbian, gay, bisexual, and transgender (LGBT) people, and publicly displaying non-heterosexual orientations, with hefty fines for noncompliance." However, other players from Russia, such as Evgeni Malkin of the Pittsburgh Penguins, did not decide to opt out of the pride nights.

== Social media ==
With technological advancements in the last few decades, professional athletes can reach and engage with a global audience. Athletes are now sources of entertainment as well as activists for social change, using social media to spread messages and influence opinions.

Social media's platforms provide an avenue through which athletes can engage directly with the public. These platforms have also become the main area for sports consumers to interact with one another, share their opinions, and respond to athletes themselves, creating an ongoing conversation between sports organizations, athletes, media sources, and audiences. Social media is also a tool in activism outside the sports sphere.

LeBron James is one athlete who has used social media to impact change. He had about 53 million followers on Twitter and 144 million followers on Instagram as of February 2023. James uses his social media presence to share opinions regarding politics, social justice issues, and other activist movements. He once stated, "We know it's bigger than us. It's not about us. I'm going to continue to do what I have to do to play this game I love to play, but this is bigger than me playing the game of basketball."

In June 2020, a group of NFL players created a video titled, "Stronger Together." The video was made to condemn racism and police brutality following the murder of George Floyd in May 2020. The video includes athletes such as Odell Beckham Jr., Patrick Mahomes, Deshaun Watson, and more. After each player (and others not featured in the video) posted the video on their platforms, the media circulated through social media. Due to the attention and engagement the video received, it was eventually re-posted on behalf of the National Football League.

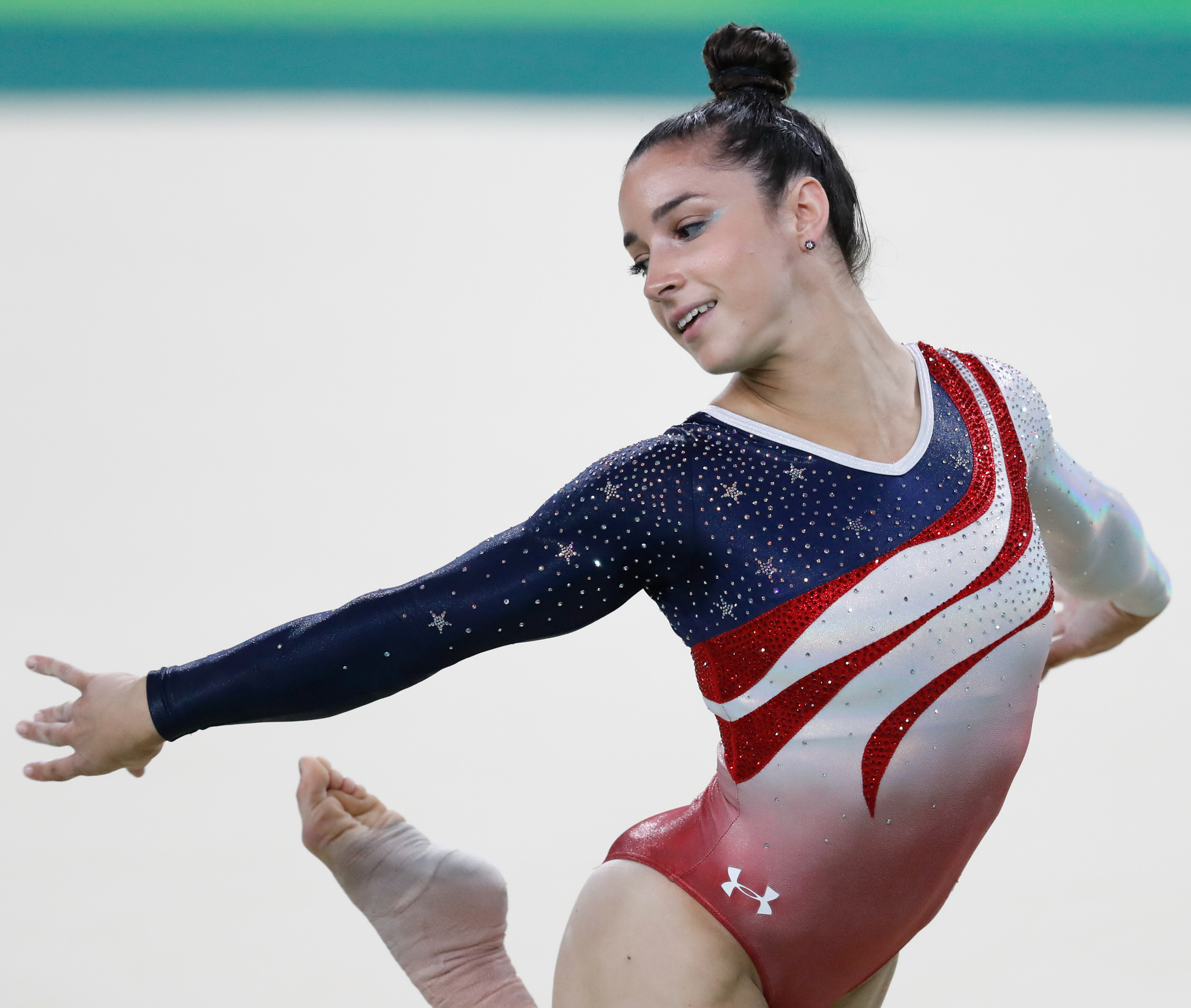
Aly Raisman competing at the 2016 Summer Olympics in Rio de Janeiro

== Feminism ==
Sexual harassment, assault, discrimination, and judgment based on sex have impacted women and sports played by them for hundreds of years. In sports, women have faced challenges when attempting to be seen as equal to their male counterparts because of a stereotype in the sports industry that says that women are unable to be as physically strong or capable as men. Because of this, female athletes competing in sports have used their public outreach to spread awareness of the discrimination they face; women have also worked to exceed societal standards and expectations through public displays and by outdoing men in certain sports.

In the 1996 Summer Olympics, Kerri Strug competed as a US gymnast. She was four-foot-nine, weighing in at ninety pounds, and was doubted by fans and fellow competitors. In the middle of the competition, Russia was ahead of the United States, so the team depended on an impaired Strug. Her coach encouraged her to complete the final vault to bring home the gold medal for the United States, which she executed successfully. Following her win, the United States women's team, oftentimes referred to as the "Magnificent Seven", refused to walk on the stage without their injured teammate, so they carried her out. After her time in the Olympics, Strug was inducted into the International Jewish Sports Hall of Fame; she is still involved in sports as a spectator and leader.

In her article written for the University of Tennessee's independent newspaper, The Daily Beacon, Erin Gwydir states, "Sports bring out the primitive overvaluing of men's physical nature to women's into a relation to patriarchal representation, strength, and overall respect." The statement refers to continued discrimination towards women in national sports. As of late, women are using their influence on the public to speak out about discrimination and harassment that they have faced during their time in the sports industry. The MeToo movement is a social movement that focuses on the sexual abuse, harassment, and discrimination that women have experienced and which allows them to address the public about it. Olympic gold medal gymnast Aly Raisman has been to universities and conferences to talk about her personal experiences with sexual abuse and discrimination, which she has endured since she was fifteen years old. Namely, she recounts incidents of sexual abuse from Larry Nassar, a former United States Gymnastics physician. Following her initial statement in 2017, several other gymnasts, including Gabby Douglas and Simone Biles, followed in her footsteps.

In the late 1960s and early 1970s, feminism was centralized around equality and promoting the idea that women are able to compete with men. Today, Western feminism is believed to focus more on the differences between men and women, which may increase gender inequality. Some people are waiting for activism that furthers women's equality in sports in the future.
