= Tommy Wingels =

American ice hockey player

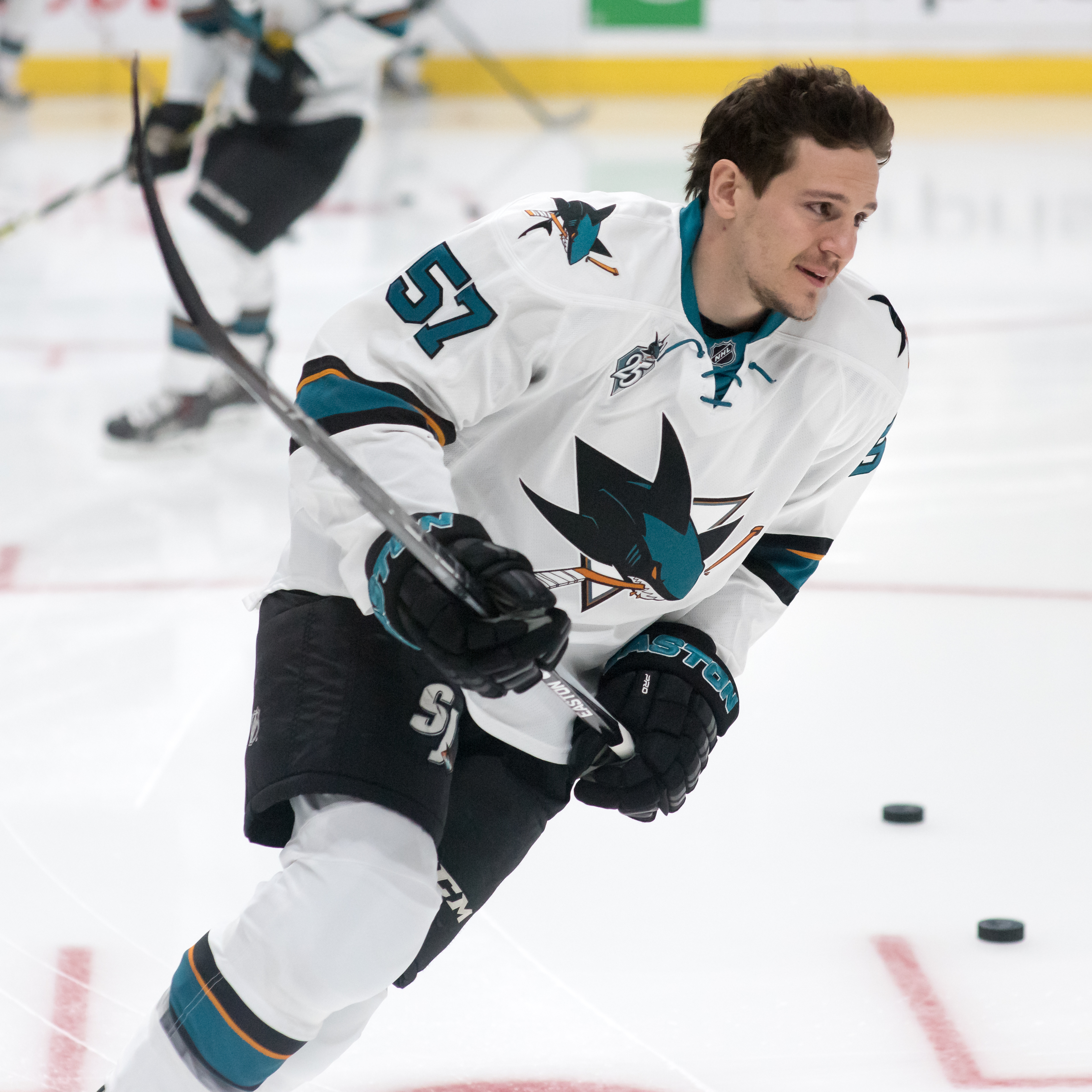
- Wingels with the San Jose Sharks in 2016
- Born: April 12, 1988 (age 38) Evanston, Illinois, U.S.
- Height: 6 ft 1 in (185 cm)
- Weight: 208 lb (94 kg; 14 st 12 lb)
- Position: Center
- Shot: Right
- Played for: San Jose Sharks; Kouvola KooKoo; Ottawa Senators; Chicago Blackhawks; Boston Bruins; Genève-Servette HC
- National team: United States
- NHL draft: 177th overall, 2008; San Jose Sharks
- Playing career: 2010–2020

Thomas Wingels (born April 12, 1988) is an American former professional ice hockey forward and current player development coach for the San Jose Sharks. He played most of his career in the National Hockey League (NHL) for the San Jose Sharks, the Ottawa Senators, the Chicago Blackhawks and the Boston Bruins and retired after two seasons in the National League (NL) with Genève-Servette HC.

== Playing career ==
As a youth, Wingels played in the 2002 Quebec International Pee-Wee Hockey Tournament with the Chicago Young Americans minor ice hockey team.

Wingels played three seasons with the Miami Redhawks of the National Collegiate Hockey Conference (NCHC). After his freshman season, he was drafted by the San Jose Sharks as the 177th pick in the 2008 NHL entry draft. He made his NHL debut on October 8, 2010, in San Jose's 2010–11 season opener wearing jersey number 57. Wingels scored his first career NHL goal in front of his hometown crowd in Chicago on January 15, 2012, against Chicago Blackhawks goaltender Corey Crawford. During the 2012–13 NHL lockout, Wingels would play in Finland for KooKoo.

On January 24, 2017, in the midst of his seventh season with the Sharks and having contributed 8 points in 37 games, Wingels was traded to the Ottawa Senators in exchange for Buddy Robinson, Zack Stortini and a seventh-round pick in the 2017 NHL entry draft.

On July 1, 2017, having left the Senators as a free agent, Wingels signed a one-year contract with the Chicago Blackhawks. On February 26, 2018, Wingels was traded to the Boston Bruins in exchange for a conditional fifth-round pick in the 2019 NHL entry draft, which would turn into a fourth-round pick if Boston advanced to the second round of the playoffs (condition met).

On August 15, 2018, after eight seasons in the NHL, Wingels signed a two-year optional, CHF 1.5 million contract with Swiss club Genève-Servette HC of the National League (NL). He broke his jaw in the first regular season game with Genève-Servette, forcing him to sit out the first two months of the 2018–19 season. Wingels only appeared in 19 regular season games (18 points) with multiple injuries throughout the season. He missed the first two games of the 2019 NL playoffs before appearing in game 3 of the 1/4 final against SC Bern, scoring one goal and tallying an assist. In that game, Wingels was also guilty of a boarding against SCB's Jan Muršak which resulted in a two-game suspension and a fine of CHF 4,000. Wingels made his return to the lineup for game 6, scoring a goal with 46 seconds to go in the game to come back to 1–2, before Daniel Winnik scored the tying goal for Geneva with 29 seconds left. The game went into overtime and Mark Arcobello scored the game-winning goal for Bern after 117 minutes, in the third OT, establishing a record for the longest game ever played in the National League. Wingels only played 2 playoffs games, putting up 3 points. On April 8, 2019, Wingels agreed to a two-year contract extension with Geneva worth CHF 1.6 million. Despite a valid contract for the 2020/21 season, Wingels was released by Servette on June 5, 2020.

On June 11, 2020, Wingels's last professional team, Genève-Servette HC, announced that he decided to retire from professional hockey.

== Personal life ==
Wingels graduated from Miami University in 2011 with a degree in accounting while playing in the American Hockey League (AHL). Wingels married his wife Molly Wingels (née Meyer) in 2014 and the two have one daughter together.

Wingels is a member of the Advisory Board for You Can Play, a campaign dedicated to fighting homophobia in sports. He has also appeared in a video supporting the campaign. He was a close friend of Brendan Burke, whose death was the catalyst for the formation of the organization. Wingels was the Sharks' nominee for the Bill Masterton Memorial Trophy in 2012, primarily for his work with You Can Play. He marched in the Chicago Pride Parade with the Chicago Gay Hockey Association on June 24, 2012.

On May 2, 2013, Wingels's work with You Can Play led him to be nominated for the NHL's King Clancy Memorial Trophy, an award given to player who best exemplifies leadership qualities on and off the ice and who has made a significant humanitarian contribution to his community.

On August 11, 2022 the San Jose Sharks announced Wingels's would join as a player development coach.

== Career statistics ==
=== Regular season and playoffs ===
			Regular season					Playoffs
Season	Team	League	GP	G	A	Pts	PIM	GP	G	A	Pts	PIM
2004–05	Team Illinois 18U AAA	MWEHL	15	7	5	12	15	—	—	—	—	—
2005–06	Team Illinois 18U AAA	T1EHL	22	15	5	20	36	—	—	—	—	—
2006–07	Cedar Rapids RoughRiders	USHL	47	10	18	28	52	6	3	0	3	6
2007–08	Miami RedHawks	CCHA	42	15	14	29	22	—	—	—	—	—
2008–09	Miami RedHawks	CCHA	41	11	17	28	66	—	—	—	—	—
2009–10	Miami RedHawks	CCHA	44	17	25	42	49	—	—	—	—	—
2010–11	San Jose Sharks	NHL	5	0	0	0	0	—	—	—	—	—
2010–11	Worcester Sharks	AHL	69	17	13	30	69	—	—	—	—	—
2011–12	San Jose Sharks	NHL	33	3	6	9	18	5	0	1	1	7
2011–12	Worcester Sharks	AHL	29	13	8	21	28	—	—	—	—	—
2012–13	KooKoo	Mestis	18	8	14	22	33	—	—	—	—	—
2012–13	San Jose Sharks	NHL	42	5	8	13	26	11	0	2	2	6
2013–14	San Jose Sharks	NHL	77	16	22	38	35	7	0	3	3	4
2014–15	San Jose Sharks	NHL	75	15	21	36	40	—	—	—	—	—
2015–16	San Jose Sharks	NHL	68	7	11	18	63	22	2	0	2	21
2016–17	San Jose Sharks	NHL	37	5	3	8	15	—	—	—	—	—
2016–17	Ottawa Senators	NHL	36	2	2	4	12	9	0	0	0	4
2017–18	Chicago Blackhawks	NHL	57	7	5	12	43	—	—	—	—	—
2017–18	Boston Bruins	NHL	18	2	3	5	2	4	0	0	0	0
2018–19	Genève–Servette HC	NL	19	11	7	18	10	2	2	1	3	0
2019–20	Genève–Servette HC	NL	43	16	23	39	41	—	—	—	—	—
NHL totals			448	62	81	143	254	58	2	6	8	42
NL totals			62	27	30	57	51	2	2	1	3	0

=== International ===
Year	Team	Event	Result	GP	G	A	Pts	PIM
2014	United States	WC	6th	7	0	0	0	6
Senior totals				7	0	0	0	6

== Awards and honors ==
Award	Year
College
NCAA All-Tournament Team	2009
All-CCHA Second Team	2009–10

Awards and achievements
Preceded by Tim Miller	CCHA Best Defensive Forward; 2009–10	Succeeded by Carl Hagelin
