= Scott Laughton =

Canadian ice hockey player (born 1994)

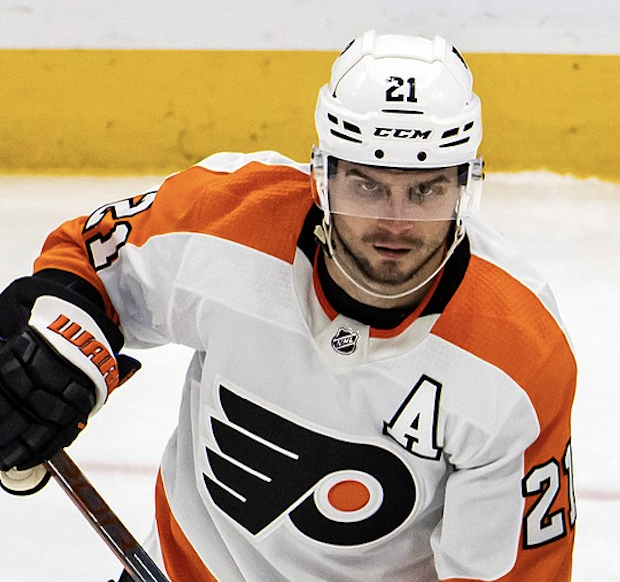
- Laughton with the Philadelphia Flyers in 2023
- Born: May 30, 1994 (age 32) Oakville, Ontario, Canada
- Height: 6 ft 1 in (185 cm)
- Weight: 177 lb (80 kg; 12 st 9 lb)
- Position: Centre
- Shoots: Left
- NHL team Former teams: Los Angeles Kings; Philadelphia Flyers; Toronto Maple Leafs
- National team: Canada
- NHL draft: 20th overall, 2012; Philadelphia Flyers
- Playing career: 2013–present

Scott Laughton (born May 30, 1994) is a Canadian professional ice hockey player who currently playing for the Los Angeles Kings of the National Hockey League (NHL).

Growing up in Oakville, Ontario, Laughton spent his junior ice hockey career playing for the Toronto Marlboros Minor Midget AAA of the Greater Toronto Hockey League (GTHL) before being drafted by the Oshawa Generals of the Ontario Hockey League (OHL). Following his sophomore season in the OHL, Laughton was drafted in the first round, 20th overall, by the Philadelphia Flyers in the 2012 NHL entry draft.

Internationally, Laughton has represented Canada at various tournaments.

== Early life ==
Laughton was born on May 30, 1994, in Oakville, Ontario, Canada, to parents Craig and Bonnie. His father coached him in ice hockey from the age of five to 14, when Laughton began to play major junior ice hockey in the Ontario Hockey League (OHL). He also captained the Mimico Mountaineers Peanut Rep lacrosse team in 2000 and led them to an undefeated season. Growing up, he was a fan of Roy Halladay of the Toronto Blue Jays of Major League Baseball (MLB). Laughton spends his Summers on his family's 8th generation pickle farm.

== Playing career ==
=== Youth ===
Growing up in Oakville, Ontario, Laughton attended the Holy Family Elementary School and Holy Trinity High School while captaining the Toronto Marlboros Minor Midget AAA of the Greater Toronto Hockey League (GTHL). While playing for the team, he named Jarome Iginla and Steven Stamkos as his role models and inspiration. In his final season with the Marlboros, Laughton also skated in two games with the St. Michael's Buzzers of the Central Canada Hockey League (CCHL). He concluded the 2009–10 GTHL season with 55 goals and 40 assists in 76 games for the Marlboros.

As a result of his minor ice hockey achievements, Laughton was drafted third overall in the 2010 OHL Selection Draft by the Oshawa Generals. In his rookie season with the Generals, Laughton skated in 63 games and accumulated 12 goals with 11 assists as the team qualified for the 2011 OHL playoffs. During the postseason, Laughton recorded one goal and one assist over 10 games as the Generals fell to the Niagara IceDogs.

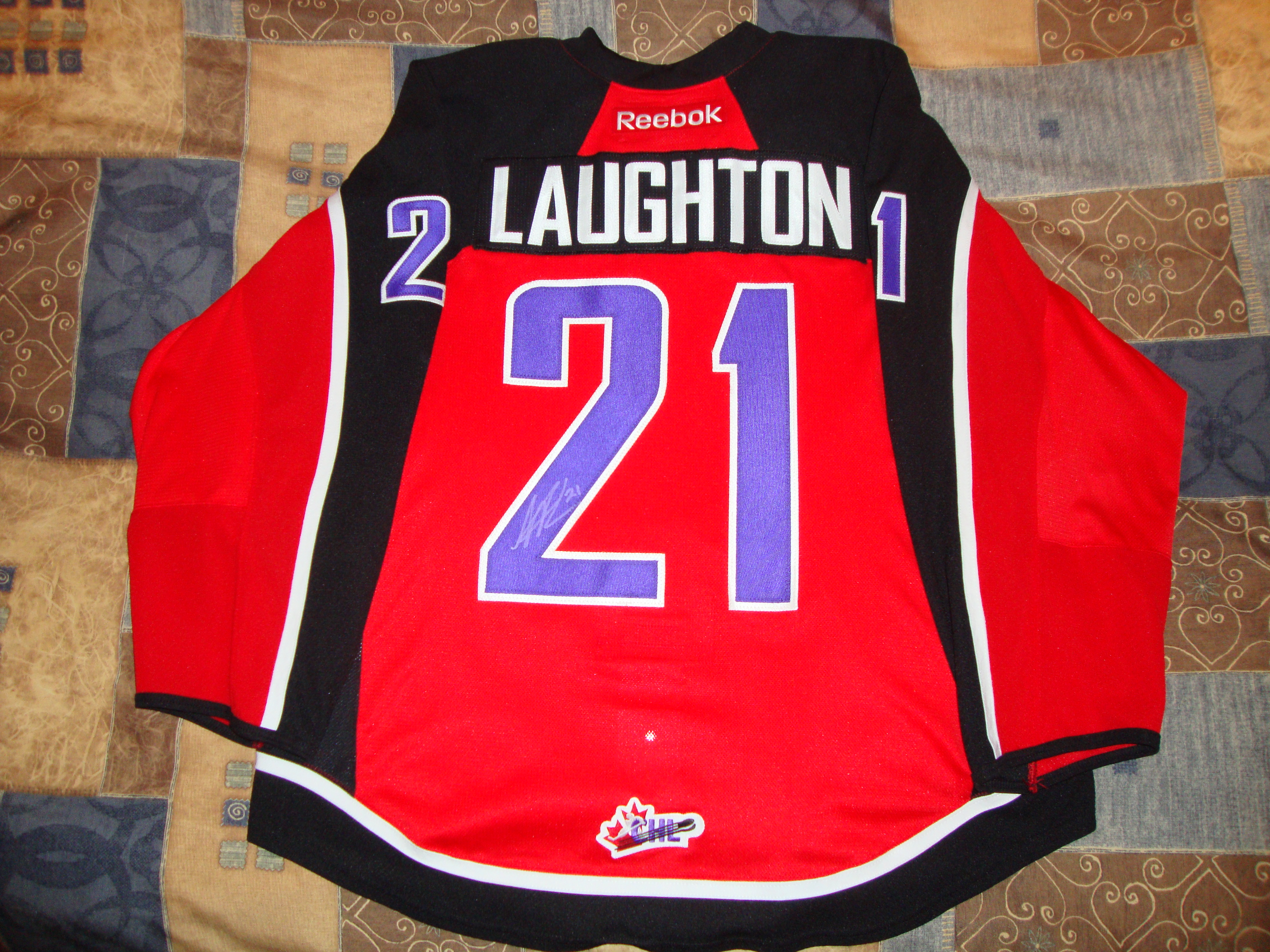
Laughton's 2012 Top Prospects Game jersey

Laughton returned to the Generals for his sophomore campaign during the 2011–12 season, where he recorded 21 goals and 32 assists in 64 games. His play earned him a roster spot on the CHL/NHL Top Prospects Game, and a ranking of 40th amongst all North American skaters in the NHL Central Scouting Bureau's mid-season rankings. In spite of his strong season, the Generals failed to qualify past the first round of the 2012 OHL playoffs, losing to the IceDogs in six games.

Following his sophomore season, Laughton was drafted in the first round, 20th overall, by the Philadelphia Flyers in the 2012 NHL entry draft. He signed a three-year, entry-level contract with the Flyers on August 8, 2012, but returned to the OHL for the 2012–13 season. He was suspended twice during the season, resulting in him only playing 49 games. His first suspension came on October 24, as a result of a hit during a game against the Ottawa 67s. Upon coming back from his 10-game suspension, Laughton said "I want to finish every check, I think I did that (in Sunday's return) and I don't want to stray away from my game at all." His second multi-game suspension of the season occurred on April 8, 2013, following a hit on Zach Hall of the Barrie Colts. In spite of this, Laughton recorded a career-high 56 points over 49 games to conclude the season.

=== Professional ===
Following the 2012–13 NHL lockout, Laughton made the Flyers out of the team's abbreviated training camp and made his NHL debut on January 19, 2013, at home against the Pittsburgh Penguins. He played 12:14 of ice time alongside Wayne Simmonds and Matt Read in a 3–1 loss, giving the Flyers five more games to decide whether he remained in the NHL or returned to major juniors. After going pointless in five games with the Flyers, Laughton was reassigned to the OHL where he competed in the 2013 OHL playoffs and recorded 13 points in seven games. Following their second round elimination, he was promoted to the Flyers' American Hockey League (AHL) affiliate, the Adirondack Phantoms, for the remainder of the season.

Following the Flyers' training camp for the 2013–14 season, Laughton was loaned back to the Oshawa Generals of the OHL after failing to remain with the NHL club to start the season. When reflecting on his training camp experience, he admitted to feeling overconfident and did not "play to his ability." In his first game back in the OHL on October 3, 2013, Laughton recorded four points in an eventual 7–1 win over the Peterborough Petes. He continued to have a breakout season and recorded 24 goals and 26 assists in 29 games by December, earning him the captaincy title for Canada under-20 team at the 2013 World Junior Championships. He ended the season as the second-leading scorer for the Generals as Oshawa finished first in the OHL's East Division and reached the Eastern Conference finals. On May 14, 2014, Laughton was named to the OHL's First All-Star Team. Flyers head coach Craig Berube later said that choosing to reassign Laughton to the OHL "helped him" and called him "one of the best players in all of junior hockey."

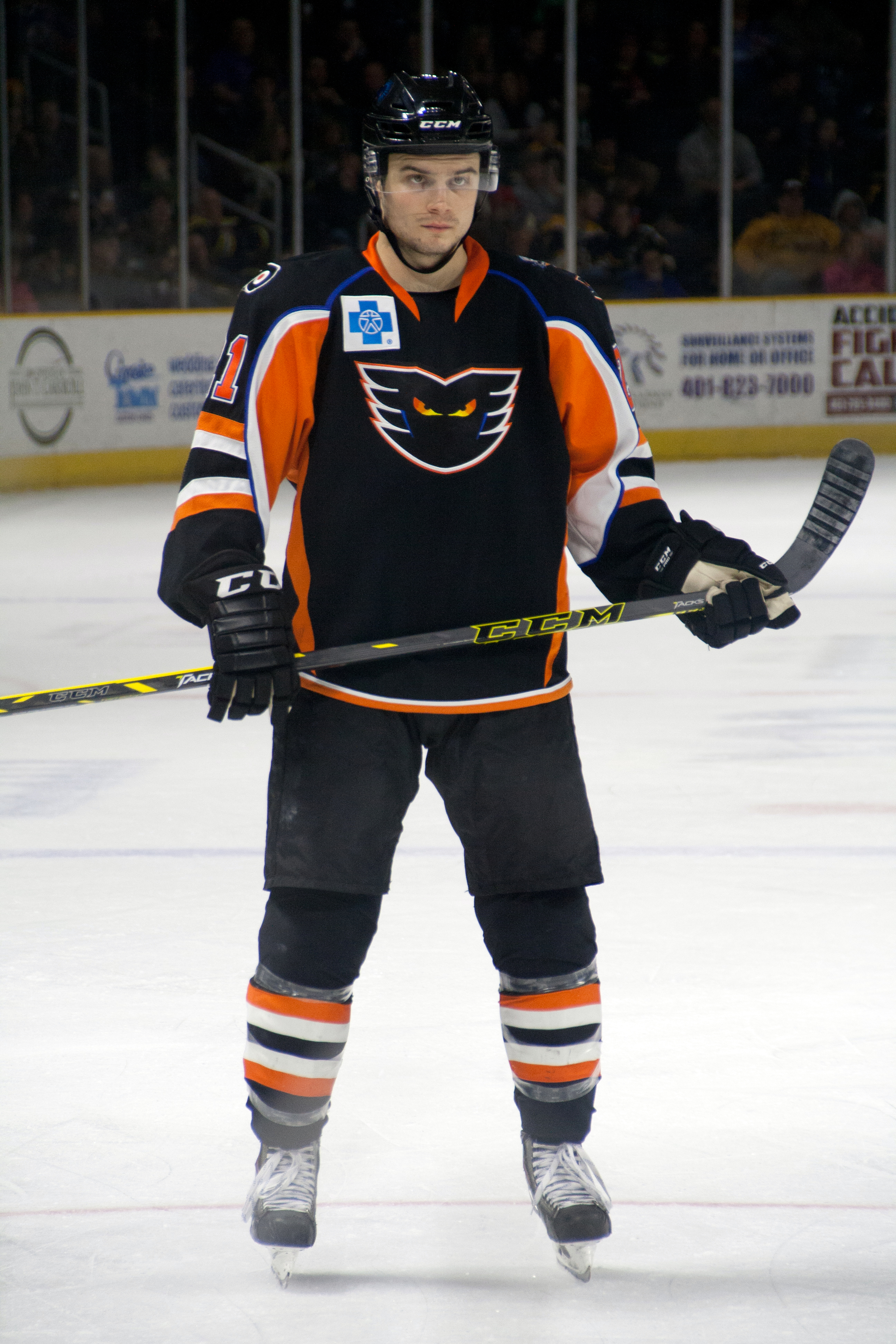
Laughton with the Lehigh Valley Phantoms in 2015

Laughton was invited to the Flyers' training camp prior to the 2014–15 season, but was reassigned to their new AHL affiliate, the Lehigh Valley Phantoms, on October 1, 2014, after being a healthy scratch for one game. To begin his first full professional season, Laughton was recognized with the CCM/AHL Player of the Week award after recording four goals in two games during the week ending on October 19. He was recalled to the NHL on December 3, and recorded his first career NHL goal 10 days later during a 5–1 win over the Carolina Hurricanes on December 13. Laughton split the rest of the season between the AHL and the NHL, recording 27 points over 39 games for the Phantoms and six points in 31 NHL games.

For the third time in his NHL career, Laughton made the Flyers' opening night roster prior to the 2015–16 season. He played in 71 games for the Flyers in a bottom six role and recorded seven goals and 14 assists for 21 points. As the Flyers met with the Washington Capitals during the 2016 Stanley Cup playoffs, Laughton suffered an injury following a collision into the boards and was stretchered off the ice. He was released from the hospital the following day but the team announced he would not rejoin the lineup. Following his shortened postseason berth, Laughton returned to the Flyers during their 2016 preseason games but suffered a lower-body injury and was expected to miss three to four weeks at the beginning of the 2016–17 season. He was then reassigned to the Phantoms for the majority of the season, but was protected by the Flyers in the 2017 NHL expansion draft. On July 11, 2017, the Flyers re-signed Laughton to a two-year, $1.925 million contract worth $962,500 annually.

In the final year of his contract, Laughton continued to fill the role of a third and fourth line centre and penalty killer for the Flyers. Playing in his sixth professional season, he set a new career-high in goals, assists, and points over 82 games, the first full season in his NHL career. He spent the majority of his playing time alongside Taylor Leier, Michael Raffl or Jordan Weal, and ended the season with the team's third-best possession numbers. Their play was noticed by hockey scouts, who said their pairing had the possibility to be "the best fourth line in the league." As a free agent at the conclusion of the season, the Flyers re-signed Laughton to a two-year, $4.6 million contract worth $2.3 million annually on July 12, 2019.

Laughton suffered a broken finger on his right hand at the start of the 2019–20 season during the second period of a 7–4 win over the Columbus Blue Jackets, and was expected to miss four weeks. He was activated off injured reserve nearly a month later on November 22, 2019, following surgery to repair his finger. Following his return, he suffered a groin injury in December, which sidelined him for seven more games. In spite of his slow start due to injury, the 2019–20 season proved to be successful, with a new career-high in goals set with 13 for a total of 27 points through 49 games. He played on the third, fourth, and second line throughout the shortened season while averaging 14:36 of ice time per game. The team rewarded his efforts by gifting him the team's 2020 Pelle Lindbergh Memorial Trophy as the team's most improved player.

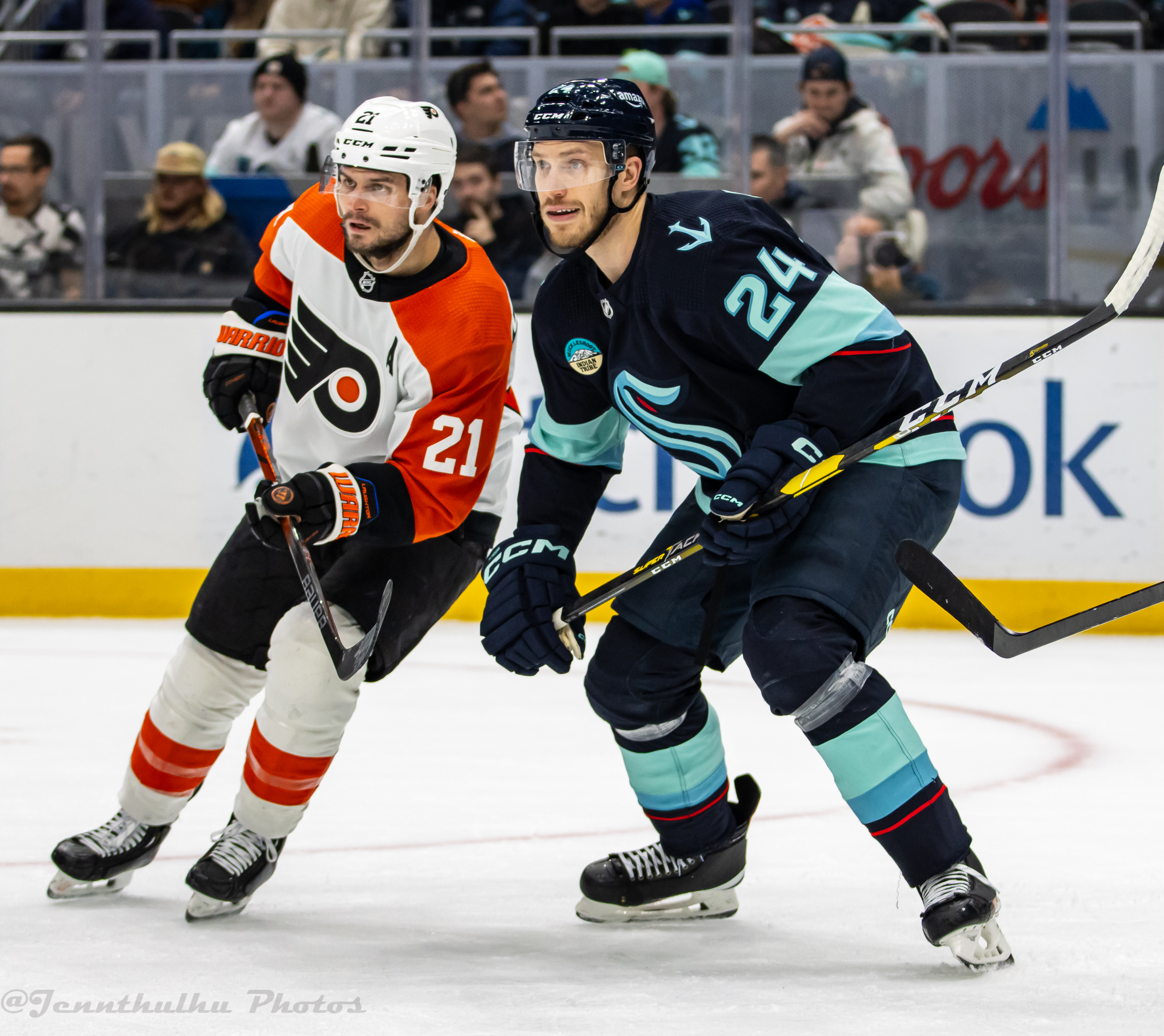
Laughton (left) battles for position against Jamie Oleksiak of the Seattle Kraken in 2023.

When the NHL returned to play after being delayed due to the COVID-19 pandemic, Laughton and the Flyers faced off against the Montreal Canadiens in the first round of the 2020 Stanley Cup playoffs as the first seed in the Eastern Conference after winning the round-robin qualifying tournament. During the series, he played on a line with Kevin Hayes and Travis Konecny. Laughton recorded a two-goal and one assist game on August 6, to send the Canadiens on the brink of elimination. They pushed past the Canadiens the following game to qualify for the second round of the playoffs against the New York Islanders. As they faced elimination against the Islanders by game five, Laughton helped the team recover from a lost lead and recorded the overtime game-winning goal off an assist from Konecny. It was his second point of the night and first overtime goal (playoff or regular season) in his career. As a result, Laughton became the sixth player in franchise history to score an overtime goal to keep the team in the series. During the next game, he recorded the game-tying shorthanded goal in the third period in an eventual 5–4 overtime win to send the series to the seventh game. In game seven Laughton recorded a fight and six hits in a 4–0 shutout loss to the Islanders.

On February 7, 2021, Laughton recorded his first career hat trick in a 7–4 win against the Washington Capitals, with goals on Vítek Vaněček and Craig Anderson. On the last day of the NHL trade deadline, Laughton signed a five-year, $15 million contract extension with the Flyers.

On December 12, 2024, Laughton recorded a four-goal game in a 4–1 win against the Detroit Red Wings.

On March 7, 2025, Laughton was traded to the Toronto Maple Leafs along with two draft picks in exchange for Nikita Grebenkin and a conditional 2027 first-round pick.

On March 6, 2026, Laughton was traded from the Maple Leafs to the Los Angeles Kings, in exchange for a conditional 2026 third-round pick.

On July 1, 2026, Laughton signed a three-year, $10.5 million contract with the Kings.

== International play ==
Medal record

Representing Canada

Ice hockey

World Championships
Gold medal – first place	2023 Finland/Latvia	

On December 28, 2010, Laughton was named an assistant captain for Team Ontario while competing at the 2011 World U-17 Hockey Challenge. Following his first season in the OHL, Laughton was invited to compete for Canada under-18 team at the 2011 Ivan Hlinka Memorial Tournament, where he won a gold medal.

As a result of a successful 2011–12 season, Laughton was named to Canada's roster for the 2012 IIHF World U18 Championships, during which he recorded seven points and led the team to a bronze medal.

On May 5, 2023, Laughton was named to Canada men's national ice hockey team at the 2023 IIHF World Championship where he recorded three goals and five assists in ten games and won a gold medal.

== Personal life ==
Laughton has worked as an ambassador for You Can Play, an organization dedicated to eliminating homophobia in sports, since he joined the NHL. He is also involved with the Alphabet Sports Collective, a Canadian organization founded to create a safe space for all genders and sexual orientations.

== Career statistics ==
=== Regular season and playoffs ===
			Regular season					Playoffs
Season	Team	League	GP	G	A	Pts	PIM	GP	G	A	Pts	PIM
2009–10	Toronto Marlboros Minor Midget AAA	GTHL	76	55	40	95	109	—	—	—	—	—
2009–10	St. Michael's Buzzers	CCHL	2	0	0	0	4	—	—	—	—	—
2010–11	Oshawa Generals	OHL	63	12	11	23	58	10	1	1	2	11
2011–12	Oshawa Generals	OHL	64	21	32	53	101	6	2	3	5	17
2012–13	Oshawa Generals	OHL	49	23	33	56	72	7	7	6	13	11
2012–13	Philadelphia Flyers	NHL	5	0	0	0	0	—	—	—	—	—
2012–13	Adirondack Phantoms	AHL	6	1	2	3	0	—	—	—	—	—
2013–14	Oshawa Generals	OHL	54	40	47	87	72	9	4	7	11	17
2014–15	Philadelphia Flyers	NHL	31	2	4	6	17	—	—	—	—	—
2014–15	Lehigh Valley Phantoms	AHL	39	14	13	27	31	—	—	—	—	—
2015–16	Philadelphia Flyers	NHL	71	7	14	21	34	3	0	0	0	0
2016–17	Lehigh Valley Phantoms	AHL	60	19	20	39	40	5	2	1	3	2
2016–17	Philadelphia Flyers	NHL	2	0	0	0	0	—	—	—	—	—
2017–18	Philadelphia Flyers	NHL	81	10	10	20	42	6	1	0	1	6
2018–19	Philadelphia Flyers	NHL	82	12	20	32	53	—	—	—	—	—
2019–20	Philadelphia Flyers	NHL	49	13	14	27	26	15	5	4	9	21
2020–21	Philadelphia Flyers	NHL	53	9	11	20	39	—	—	—	—	—
2021–22	Philadelphia Flyers	NHL	67	11	19	30	35	—	—	—	—	—
2022–23	Philadelphia Flyers	NHL	78	18	25	43	50	—	—	—	—	—
2023–24	Philadelphia Flyers	NHL	82	13	26	39	69	—	—	—	—	—
2024–25	Philadelphia Flyers	NHL	60	11	16	27	21	—	—	—	—	—
2024–25	Toronto Maple Leafs	NHL	20	2	2	4	11	13	0	2	2	8
2025–26	Toronto Maple Leafs	NHL	43	8	4	12	17	—	—	—	—	—
2025–26	Los Angeles Kings	NHL	21	5	3	8	14	4	0	0	0	0
NHL totals			745	121	168	289	428	41	6	6	12	35

=== International ===
Year	Team	Event	Result	GP	G	A	Pts	PIM
2011	Canada Ontario	U17	1st place, gold medalist(s)	5	2	2	4	4
2012	Canada	U18	3rd place, bronze medalist(s)	7	2	5	7	4
2023	Canada	WC	1st place, gold medalist(s)	10	3	5	8	0
Junior totals				12	4	7	11	8
Senior totals				10	3	5	8	0

== Awards and honors ==
Award	Year	Ref
OHL
First All-Star Team	2014	
Philadelphia Flyers
Pelle Lindbergh Memorial Trophy	2020	
Yanick Dupre Memorial Class Guy Award	2020	

Awards and achievements
Preceded by Sean Couturier	Philadelphia Flyers' first-round draft pick 2012	Succeeded by Samuel Morin
