= Pride Night =

LGBTQ-themed games hosted by sports teams

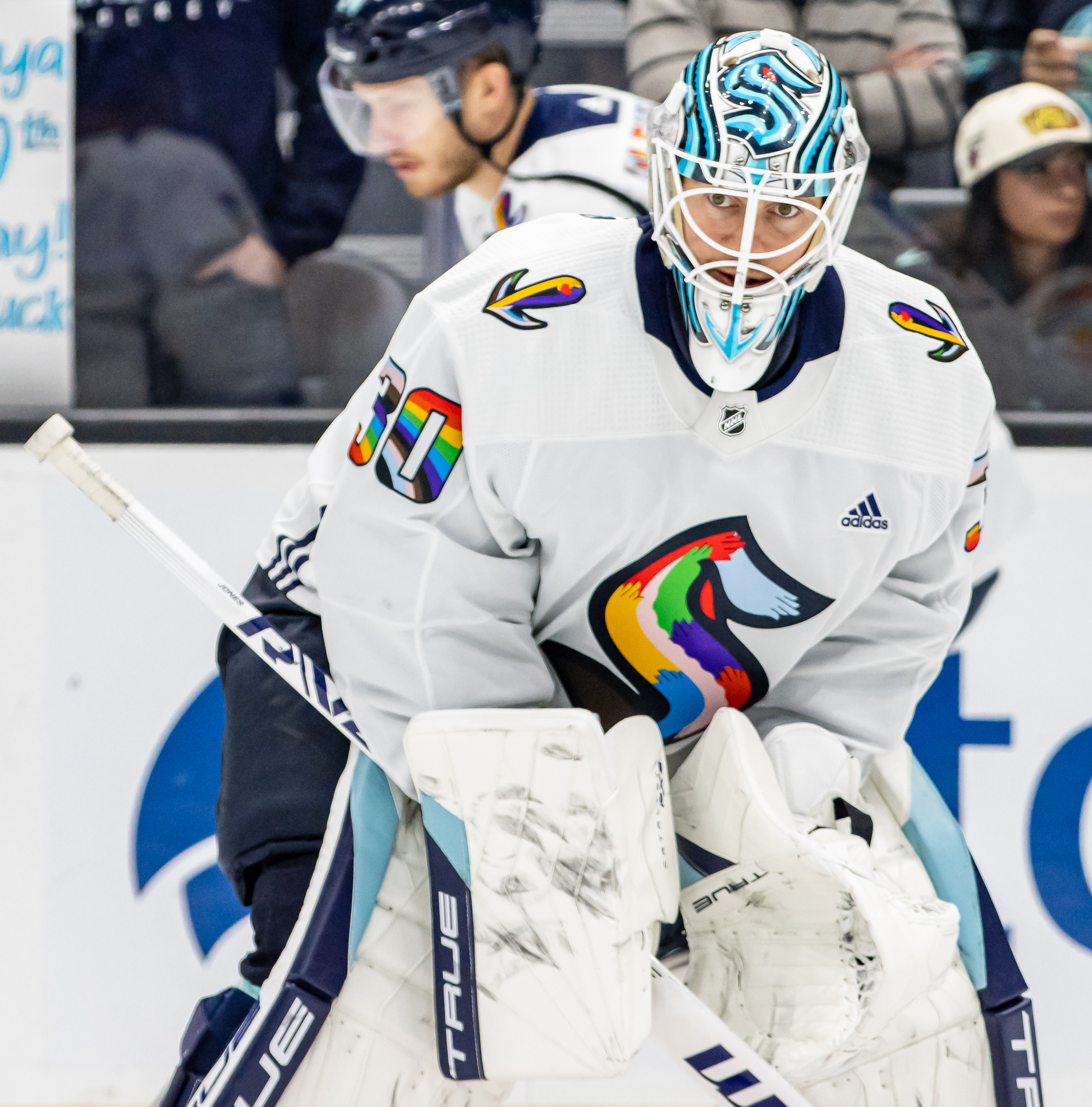
Martin Jones of the Seattle Kraken wears a rainbow-themed jersey during a Pride Night game in 2023.

A Pride Night (also called Pride Day or Pride game) is a game hosted by a sports team to recognize and attract individuals from the LGBTQ community. During such a game, the home team acknowledges LGBTQ fans and honors certain individuals or groups. The first Pride Night by a team in a major U.S. and Canadian league was hosted by the Los Angeles Dodgers of Major League Baseball (MLB) in 2000, and since then, Pride events have been hosted by teams in most major leagues. Some leagues, teams, and players have limited their association with Pride celebrations, causing controversy.

== Description ==
Pride Night events, which recognize the LGBTQ community, are typically held in June, which is Pride Month in many countries. Pride Night games typically see a higher turnout of LGBTQ fans than normal, with Dodgers executive Erik Braverman estimating that up to half of the audience for their 2021 event being members of the LGBTQ community. During the events, LGBTQ-themed team merchandise is usually sold or given away, while LGBTQ symbols, such as pride flags and rainbow colors, are prominently displayed in the venue.

== International ==
=== FIFA World Cup ===
At the 2026 FIFA World Cup, Egypt and Iran played a Group G match on June 26, 2026, at Seattle Stadium. Since Seattle Pride took place the same weekend, the local organizing committee had designated the June 26 match as a "Pride Match," before the teams were known. Both countries objected to the designation for their World Cup match. Seattle's Pride Match Advisory Committee spokesperson said: "The Pride Match has been scheduled to celebrate and elevate Pride events in Seattle and across the country and it was planned well in advance." Iranian Football Federation President Mehdi Taj said both countries had "objections" and that the branding was an "irrational move that supports a certain group." Iran was planning to appeal the decision. The Egyptian Football Association sent a formal letter to FIFA Secretary General Mattias Grafström rejecting "in absolute terms" LGBTQ connections to the game. The match proceeded without incident, ending in a 1–1 draw. Some fans expressed disappointment about the lack of Pride-related celebrations inside the stadium.

== Europe ==
=== Premier League ===
The Premier League, the top division of association football in the English football league system, participated in Stonewall's Rainbow Laces campaign between 2013 and 2025. In 2025, Ipswich Town's captain Sam Morsy did not wear a special rainbow armband, while Crystal Palace F.C. captain Marc Guehi wrote "I love Jesus" on his. Hours before a match, Manchester United abandoned plans to wear a jacket supporting the LGBTQ+ campaign after Noussair Mazraoui refused to wear it. As a result, the Premier League started a new campaign called "With Pride" between February 6 and February 13, 2026, during which each team had one match at home. Team captains were no longer asked to wear special armbands or jackets, and teams were encouraged to use in-stadium features, such as ball plinths and video screens, to display Pride-themed messaging.

== North America ==
=== Major League Baseball ===
Major League Baseball (MLB) teams often dedicate certain regular season games for specific groups or for specific causes, often as a way to attract members of these communities to their games. For instance, in 2015, the Philadelphia Phillies hosted numerous regular season events at their home venue, Citizens Bank Park, such as Jackie Robinson Salute in April, First Responders Night in May, and Grandparents Day in September. Pride Night is one of these themed nights. In 2021, the Los Angeles Dodgers' Pride Night was one of the first Pride events to take place in the city that year.

==== First Pride Night events ====
In 1994, the San Francisco Giants hosted "Until There's a Cure Day" at their stadium to raise money and awareness for the ongoing AIDS epidemic, which Cronkite News stated in 2023 was "one of the first known LGBTQ-supportive nights" in North American sports. However, the first Pride Night occurred in 2000. On August 8 of that year, a lesbian couple, Danielle Goldey and Meredith Kott, were removed by security guards from a Dodgers game at Dodger Stadium for kissing. Following their ejection, the couple reached out to a lawyer with the intent to sue the team. However, before any legal actions were taken, the Dodgers reached out to the couple and both apologized and offered to give them seats behind home plate for a future game. Speaking of the incident, team president Bob Graziano said, "I was troubled ... because of what it implied about the Dodger organization." Additionally, the team gave away 5,000 tickets to gay rights groups. The following month, on September 6, GLAAD and the Los Angeles Gay and Lesbian Center hosted a "Gay and Lesbian Night at Dodger Stadium." According to sports commentator Cyd Zeigler, the event is widely considered the first Pride Night at a professional baseball game. However, this event was a one-off occurrence, and at the time, there were no future LGBTQ events planned at Dodger Stadium. During the 2001 season, the Chicago Cubs sponsored "Gay Days" at Wrigley Field. The event, later renamed "Out at Wrigley," was started by Bill Gubrud, a gay man from Chicago, and has been an annual occurrence ever since.

==== Later developments ====
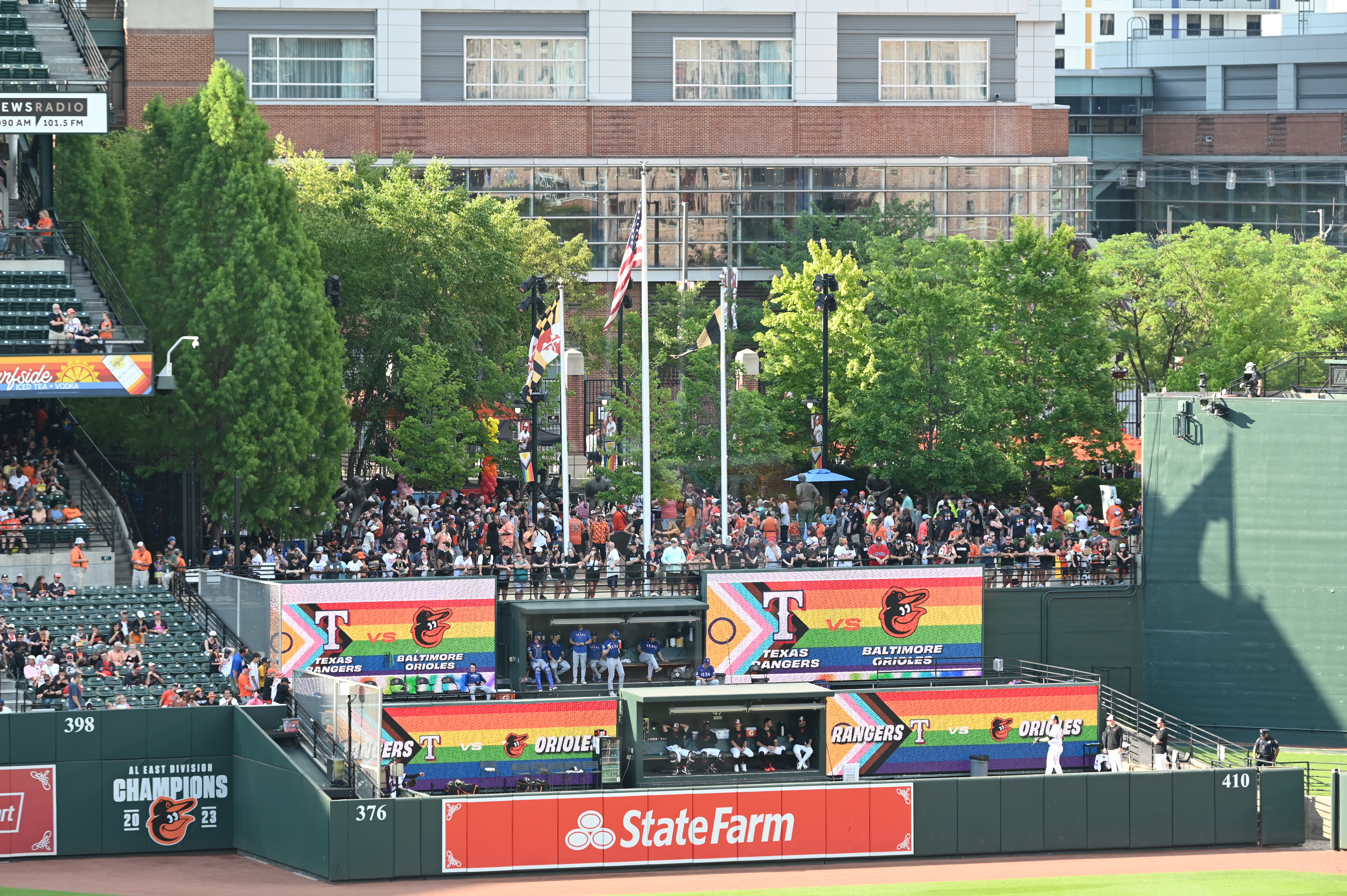
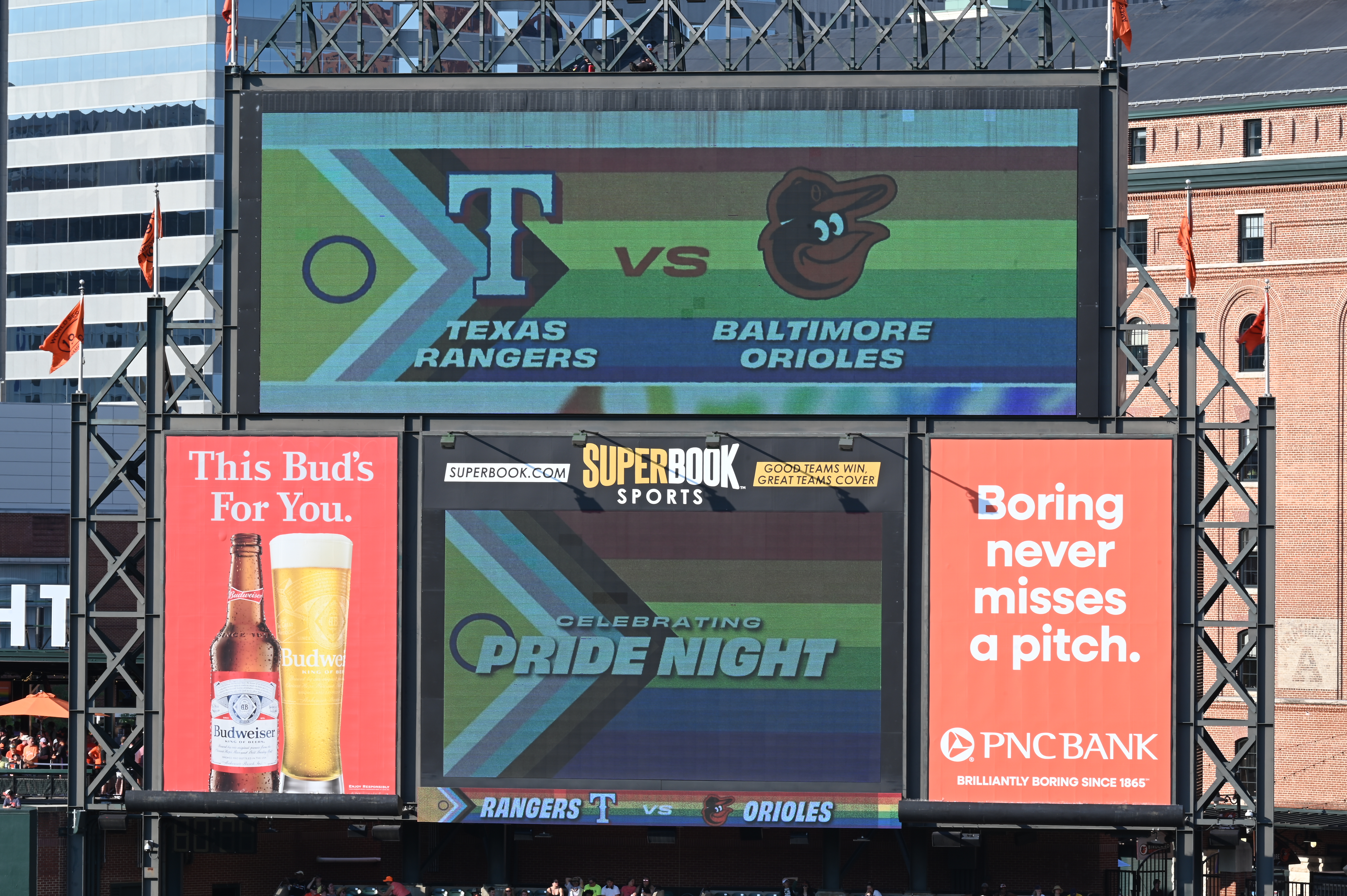
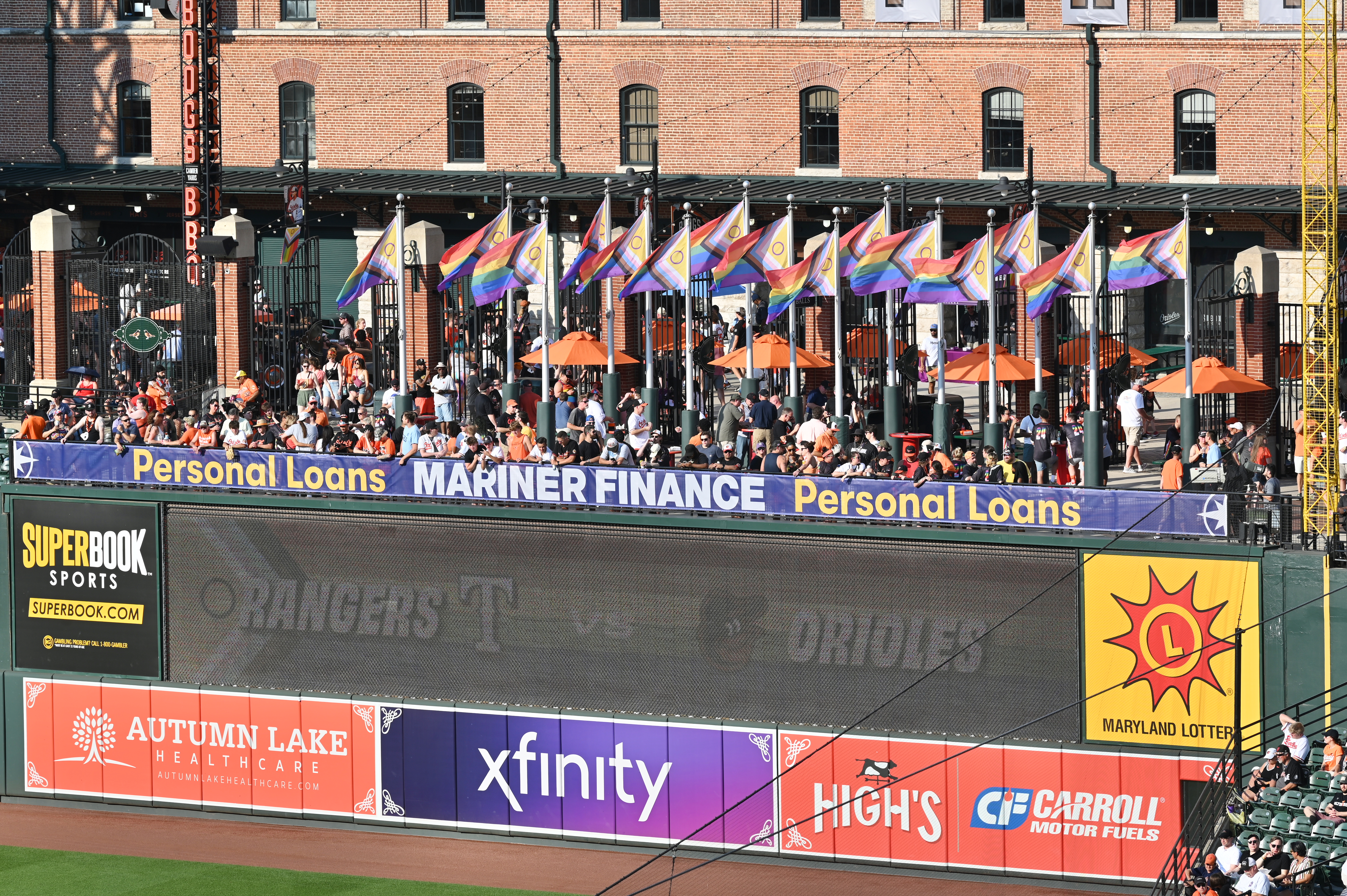
Oriole Park at Camden Yards during the Baltimore Orioles' Pride Night game against the Texas Rangers, June 27, 2024

In 2013, the Dodgers hosted their second Pride event. Over the mid-2010s, the league as a whole attempted to foster a better relationship with the LGBTQ community. In 2014, the league hired Billy Bean, a former baseball player and gay activist, to educate current players and team officials on matters related to LGBTQ issues, such as defamatory language. That same year, MLB issued a letter opposing Arizona SB 1062, arguing that it went against the league's "zero-tolerance policy for harassment or discrimination based on sexual orientation." That same year, the Cleveland Indians hosted a Pride Night to coincide with the 2014 Gay Games that were being hosted in the city. In 2016, the league partnered with the National Gay and Lesbian Chamber of Commerce in an effort to help LGBTQ-owned businesses seek out MLB contracts. That same year, the Tampa Bay Rays used their Pride Night to raise roughly $300,000 (equivalent to $402,000 in 2025) for a fund to help victims of the Pulse nightclub shooting, which had occurred shortly before the event. In 2019, the New York Yankees honored the fiftieth anniversary of the Stonewall riots by unveiling a plaque at Yankee Stadium. In 2021, the Oakland Athletics renamed their annual Pride Night event in honor of former baseball player and gay activist Glenn Burke, who was honored the following year at the Dodgers' Pride Night. In 2023, former Speaker of the House of Representatives Nancy Pelosi threw out the ceremonial first pitch during the Washington Nationals' Pride Night, which they call "Night Out." That same year, the Associated Press called MLB "a leader among the four major pro U.S. sports in hosting Pride Nights, in part because its regular season overlaps with Pride Month in June."

==== Controversies ====
===== 2022 Tampa Bay Rays rainbow logo patch =====
During Pride Night events in 2022, three teams—the Dodgers, the Giants, and the Rays—incorporated rainbow-colored logo patches into their uniform. However, multiple players for the Rays stated that they would not be wearing the patch, with relief pitcher Jason Adam calling it a "faith-based decision" on his part. Writing about the decision, sports journalist Tyler Kepner stated that "by allowing the players to opt out of the promotion — and to use the platform to endorse an opposite viewpoint — the Rays undercut the message of inclusion they were trying to send."

In June 2023, Commissioner of Baseball Rob Manfred announced that MLB had advised teams against adding rainbow motifs to their logo patches so as not to put players "in a position of doing something that may make them uncomfortable because of their personal views."

===== 2023 Los Angeles Dodgers Sisters of Perpetual Indulgence collaboration =====
In 2023, the Dodgers announced plans to honor the Sisters of Perpetual Indulgence with a Community Hero Award at their Pride Night, to be held on June 16. The Sisters are a San Francisco-based charity and protest group that employ religious symbolism and humor to call attention to intolerance towards LGBTQ people. However, in mid-May, the Dodgers announced that they would not be honoring the group at their Pride Night, effectively disinviting the group. The decision came after the team received significant backlash from several Catholic groups, including the Catholic League, and a letter from Senator Marco Rubio of Florida, who asked if the Sisters would be "inclusive and welcoming to Christians." Following this, several LGBTQ advocacy groups expressed disappointment with the team's disinvitation, with the American Civil Liberties Union of Southern California and Los Angeles Pride both stating that they would not be participating in the Dodgers' Pride Night, in solidarity with the Sisters. Additionally, the Los Angeles LGBT Center issued a statement saying, "Buckling to pressure from out-of-state, right-wing fundamentalists, the Dodgers caved to a religious minority that is perpetuating a false narrative about L.G.B.T.Q.+ people. They have been fed lies about the Sisters of Perpetual Indulgence, and have therefore contributed to the ongoing, anti-L.G.B.T.Q. smear campaign happening in this country." In a show of support for the Sisters, Mayor Ashleigh Aitken of Anaheim extended an invitation for them to attend the Pride Night hosted by the Anaheim-based Los Angeles Angels.

Following the backlash, on May 22, the Dodgers reversed their decision and reinvited the Sisters to attend their Pride Night and receive the Community Hero Award. The team stated that their decision came after "much thoughtful feedback" and pledged to continue to work with "LGBTQ+ partners to better educate ourselves, find ways to strengthen the ties that bind and use our platform to support all of our fans who make up the diversity of the Dodgers family." Dodgers player Clayton Kershaw criticized the re-invitation, stating that, while he was not opposed to the LGBTQ community, he viewed the Sisters' satirical take on religion as offensive to Christians. Additionally, three American Catholic bishops—Timothy Broglio, Timothy M. Dolan, and José Horacio Gómez—criticized the Dodgers' decision as blasphemous.

===== 2026 San Francisco Giants rainbow logo hat =====
On June 12, 2026, the Giants hosted a Pride Night event that featured the team's logo in the colors of the Rainbow flag. Starting pitcher Landen Roupp, relievers JT Brubaker and Ryan Walker each wrote the Bible passage Genesis 9:12–16 on their respective hats, while reliever Sam Hentges opted to wear the regular hat without the rainbow logo instead. Following the game, Brubaker, Roupp and Walker were each reprimanded and issued warnings by MLB for writing on their caps. However, no further action was taken by the Giants, with manager Tony Vitello claiming it was "just kind of a general knowledge" that players "have the freedom to do what they think is best." The players' protest drew criticism from local outlets and fans, given the region's long history with the LGBTQ community.

===== Texas Rangers' lack of Pride Game =====
By 2022, every team in MLB had conducted at least one Pride Game, with the exception of the Texas Rangers. As of the 2026 season, they remain the lone team out of the 30 MLB franchises to not hold a Pride Game. The closest that the team has come to hosting a Pride Game, according to the Associated Press, was in September 2003, when the team invited several local LGBTQ groups to their venue for a fundraising event prior to a game. According to the Associated Press, one reason for this could be the conservative political climate within the state of Texas, which in 2023 enacted a series of legislation targeting the LGBTQ community. However this is often disputed as the 3 other major sports teams in Dallas-Fort Worth Dallas Mavericks, Dallas Stars, and FC Dallas regularly hold pride games. The news agency also pointed out that Ray Davis, the team's owner, has previously donated large sums of money in support of Greg Abbott, the state's conservative governor. Additionally, the Associated Press noted that the location of the Rangers' stadium may play a role in their decision to not host a Pride Game. While the Houston Astros, the state's only other MLB team, does host Pride Games, their stadium is located in Houston, a populous city that largely votes for Democratic elected officials. By comparison, the Rangers play in Arlington, outside of the city limits of Dallas, in an area of the state that is generally more conservative than Dallas. In a 2023 article in The New York Times, it was reported that the Resource Center, a local LGBTQ group, had been trying for five years at that point to host a Pride Game at the Rangers' stadium.

=== National Basketball Association ===
In February 2007, the Toronto Raptors of the National Basketball Association (NBA) hosted a benefit game for Rainbow Hoops, a lesbian basketball league. However, the league's first Pride Nights occurred in 2016, with the Milwaukee Bucks and the Portland Trail Blazers hosting events during the 2016–17 season. That same year, the NBA participated for the first time in the NYC Pride March. Starting in 2017, the league began to sell t-shirts with rainbow-colored versions of their team's logos. In April 2021, the Phoenix Suns hosted a Pride Night that was the first in-person Pride Night to be held by any sports team following the declaration of the COVID-19 pandemic. In a 2025 report by Outsports, of the 30 NBA teams, 25 were definitely hosting a Pride Night, 4 were possibly hosting a Pride Night, and only one—the Oklahoma City Thunder—had expressly stated that they would not hold such an event.

=== National Football League ===
Pride Nights among National Football League (NFL) teams are rare, allegedly due to the fact that the NFL season does not coincide with Pride Month as well as the low amount of home games, though this has not stopped other professional sports. On September 16, 2021, during a Thursday Night Football game, the Washington Football Team became the first NFL team to host a Pride Night event when they hosted the New York Giants. Since 2021, the NFL has collaborated with GLAAD to host a "Night of Pride" celebration during the week of the Super Bowl as part of an outreach program aimed at the LGBTQ community. Night of Pride events have been ongoing through 2025.

=== National Hockey League ===
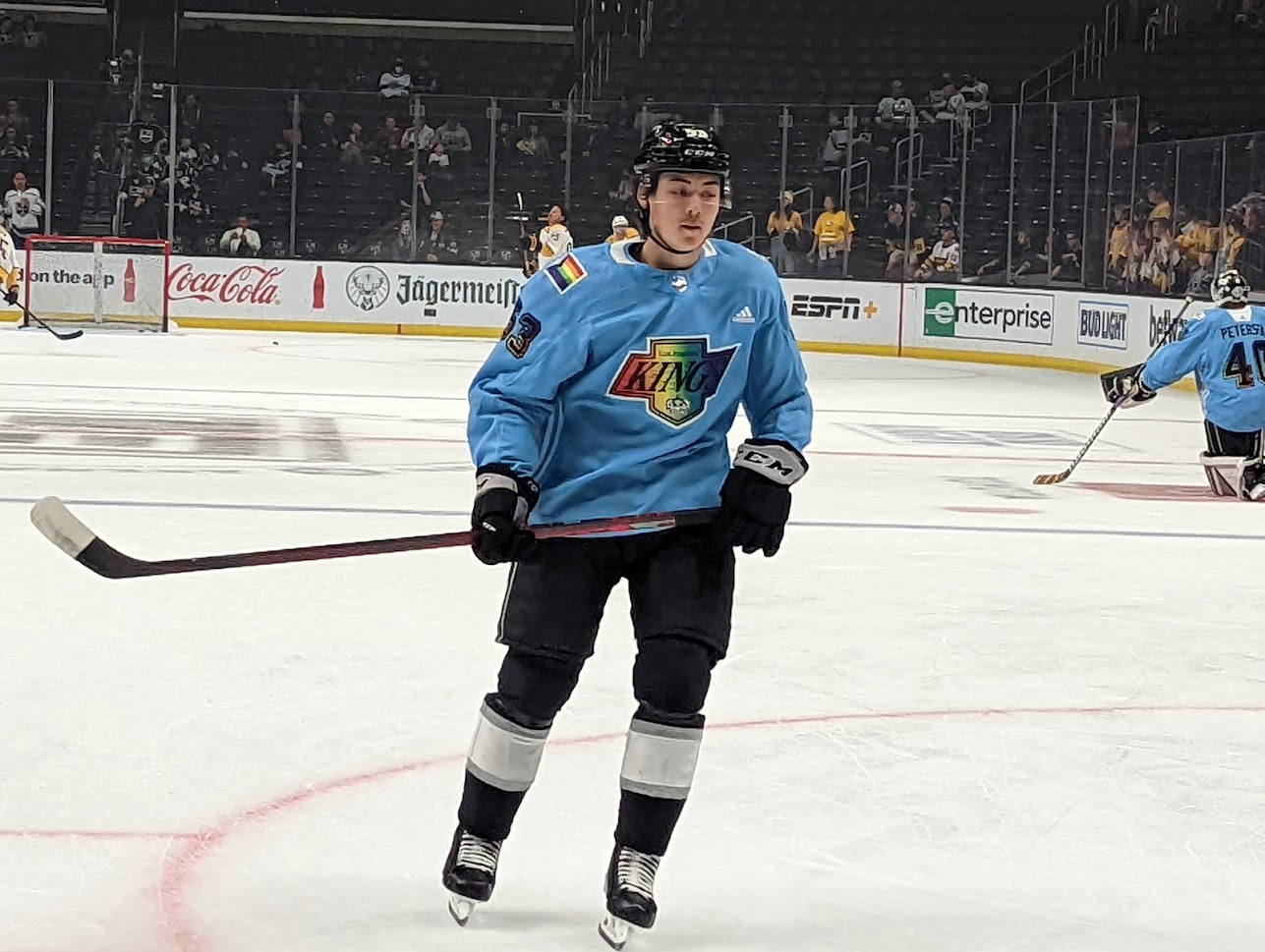
Jordan Spence of the Los Angeles Kings wearing a rainbow-themed jersey during a Pride Night game on March 22, 2022

The first Pride Night in the National Hockey League (NHL) was held on March 30, 2011, when the San Jose Sharks hosted the Dallas Stars. In 2013, the NHL partnered with You Can Play to address the issue of homophobia in ice hockey. In February 2017, the Sharks used rainbow tape for their ice hockey sticks during a game against the Buffalo Sabres. By the 2017–18 season, all 31 NHL teams were hosting a Pride Night, with players often using rainbow-colored tape on their ice hockey sticks. The next season, several players on the Vancouver Canucks wore rainbow-themed jerseys during their Pride Night game on March 13, 2019. By the 2022–23 season, roughly half of all NHL teams had players wear rainbow-themed jerseys during warmups on Pride Nights.

On December 10, 2025, the trailer for the series Heated Rivalry was aired at the Pride Night game between the Montreal Canadiens and the Tampa Bay Lightning.

==== Controversies ====
===== 2023 Pride Tape ban and jersey ban =====
In 2023, players on several teams expressed opposition to the Pride jerseys, often on religious grounds or, in the case of Russian players, safety concerns stemming from anti-LGBTQ laws in Russia. As a result, in mid-2023, the NHL promulgated rules barring teams from donning rainbow-themed jerseys or using rainbow-colored tape. The Pride Tape ban was repealed in late October 2023, though the jersey ban remains in place.

===== Cancelled Pride Nights =====
On August 28, 2026, the Dallas Stars announced they would not be hosting a Pride Night for the first time in five years.

=== Women's National Basketball Association ===
The Women's National Basketball Association (WNBA) was the first professional sports league to establish a formal Pride campaign, doing so in 2014. Although the WNBA quickly developed a large lesbian fan following after its debut in 1997, the league largely avoided broad association with the LGBTQ community during its early years. The league shifted its approach in 2014, saying that it was the first sports league to appeal specifically to gay men and lesbians, with special T-shirts and a Pride Day game on national television. League president Laurel Richie told ESPN that its Pride shirts were the best-selling item on the league's webstore and in its retail store in New York City. Individual WNBA teams have attracted positive attention for their Pride Night or Pride Day events, with the notable exception of the San Antonio Stars, which did not acknowledge Pride during their designated game, and whose player Sophia Young had posted on her Twitter account in opposition to same-sex marriage in San Antonio.

=== Ultimate Fighting Championship ===
The Ultimate Fighting Championship (UFC), a mixed martial arts (MMA) promotion, has never held a Pride Night event. In an interview with Tomi Lahren for Fox News held shortly after the San Francisco Giants' rainbow hat controversy in 2026, UFC CEO Dana White said that although the UFC has sold merchandise with a Pride theme, and although some MMA fighters are gay, he did not consider it necessary to have a UFC event overtly themed with Pride. White told Lahren that he did not want the UFC to force fighters to say particular things, and that his feelings about free speech have motivated him to criticize, but not to discipline, fighters who have made homophobic or transphobic remarks.

== Oceania ==
=== Australian Football League ===
The Australian Football League (AFL) hosted their first Pride game in 2015 between the Sydney Swans and the Fremantle Football Club.

Teams have continued to host Pride games since. In 2026, the Sydney Swans moved their annual Pride game from their match against the St Kilda Football Club to their match against the Western Bulldogs. This was due to allegations that St Kilda's Lance Collard used a homophobic slur and the ongoing tribunal hearings. The organizers of the Pride game determined the controversy around the allegations could distract from the event and impact the positive atmosphere of the game.

=== A-League ===
The A-League Men and A-League Women hosted their first Pride games in 2022, where the Adelaide United men's team faced off against the Central Coast Mariners, and the women's team against the Melbourne Victory. It came four months after Adelaide United player Josh Cavallo became the first active male top-flight professional soccer player to come out as gay.

== See also ==
- Athlete activism in the United States
- Homosexuality in modern sports
- Pride (LGBTQ culture)
