= Brendan Burke =

Ice hockey player (1988–2010)

- Burke in 2007, standing next to the Stanley Cup after it was won by the Anaheim Ducks, managed by his father Brian Burke
- Born: December 8, 1988; Vancouver, British Columbia, Canada
- Died: February 5, 2010 (aged 21); Economy, Indiana, U.S.
- Education: Xaverian Brothers High School; Miami University
- Occupations: Hockey management Hockey goalie
- Employer: Miami University
- Known for: LGBT activism
- Parent(s): Brian Burke, Kerry G. Burke

Brendan Gilmore Burke (December 8, 1988 – February 5, 2010) was an athlete and student manager at Miami University for the RedHawks men's ice hockey team. The youngest son of Brian Burke, former general manager of the Toronto Maple Leafs, longtime executive of various other NHL teams and of the US Olympic hockey team, in November 2009, he made international headlines for coming out, advocating for tolerance and speaking out against homophobia in professional sports. Burke's coming out was widely praised and supported by sports news outlets and fans, generating multiple discussions about homophobia in sports, and in hockey in particular. He was viewed as a pioneer in advocacy against homophobia in hockey, described as "the closest person to the NHL ever to come out publicly and say that he is gay."

Burke was killed in a car crash on February 5, 2010. Following his death, Burke's memory and contribution to LGBT awareness in hockey was honoured by several hockey teams. The "Brendan Burke Internship" was later established in his honour by USA Hockey for his work in hockey management and a documentary entitled The Legacy of Brendan Burke aired on CBC Television in November 2010. Burke's death was the catalyst for the formation of the You Can Play project, a campaign to end homophobia in sports.

== Early life ==
Brendan Gilmore Burke was born on December 8, 1988, in Vancouver, British Columbia, and was the younger son and third of four children of his father's first marriage. His parents divorced in 1995, and in 1997 he moved with his mother, Kerry to Boston, Massachusetts. During high school, Burke played hockey as a goaltender on the varsity team, but quit because he worried that his teammates would discover that he was gay. Instead, he told his family that he wanted to quit rather than spend the season on the bench. He graduated from Xaverian Brothers High School in Westwood, Massachusetts.

After high school, Burke could not decide between going to law school (after completing college), or a career in hockey management. He attended Miami University in Oxford, Ohio, where he was a brother in Sigma Phi Epsilon and came out as gay during his sophomore year. He interned on Capitol Hill in the summer of 2009 for U.S. Representative Bill Delahunt, and became a student manager at Miami University, responsible for recruiting correspondences, reviewing game film, working with coaches, and analyzing players. During this time, he attempted to decide between a career in politics or hockey management, eventually deciding on the latter.

== Coming out and advocacy ==
Imagine if I was in the opposite situation, with a family that wouldn't accept me, working for a sports team where I knew I couldn't come out because I'd be fired or ostracized ... people in that situation deserve to know that they can feel safe, that sports isn't all homophobic and that there are plenty of people in sports who accept people for who they are.

— Brendan Burke, ESPN.com

Burke came out to his family during Christmas of 2007 and to his father, then-general manager of the Anaheim Ducks Brian Burke, after attending a Ducks game in Vancouver on December 10. Brian as well as the rest of Burke's family were accepting of his sexuality. However, Brendan's father and older brother Patrick, also a hockey manager, were concerned about how this might impact Brendan's career in hockey, noting homophobia in the hockey world in particular. As an advocate, Burke returned yearly to his high school to give talks on his experience coming to terms with his sexuality in a largely homophobic sports culture and the positive personal impact of his father's support.

In November 2009, Burke came out to one of his teammates, Pat Cannone, after he was asked about his love life. He then came out to the rest of the Miami University hockey team, of which he was also the video coordinator and student manager, that he was gay. The story was leaked to ESPN.com. The Burkes appeared on the Canadian sports channel TSN, where Brendan Burke said he hoped his story would give other gay athletes and those working in professional sports the confidence to come forward. The team's coach, Enrico Blasi, and the rest of the team first learned of Burke's sexual orientation after the Frozen Four NCAA men's hockey championship in 2009. Burke was concerned that the news story on his sexual orientation might be distracting to the team, and approached Blasi, offering to walk away from the story if Blasi disapproved. With full veto power on the story, Blasi gave it his full support. His team was also accepting of his sexuality.

Burke's public coming out was met with wide support from the press and fans, with the ESPN interview garnering praise from the hockey world. He received hundreds of emails and letters of support from gay athletes from across the continent. The news of his father's acceptance of his sexual orientation also earned Brian Burke praise from press and fans inside and outside the hockey world. The news further launched Brendan into advocacy, speaking about homophobia in hockey and encouraging discussion on the challenges faced by gay athletes in hockey and mainstream sports in general. In a later TSN interview, Burke stated that he hoped that telling his story would allow gay athletes and pro sports workers to know that there were supportive, safe environments for them and would encourage them to step forward as well. Toronto's Parents, Families and Friends of Lesbians and Gays (PFLAG) began using Burke's coming-out story as a teaching tool, stating that the story could "change so many families across Canada, particularly because so many young boys are expected to grow up playing with a hockey stick and make their dads happy." His coming-out story gained further attention from a large variety of news outlets in the days that followed. Interest in Brendan's story was attributed to both his relation to his father and "hockey's sometimes homophobic culture."

Brendan Burke became well known in hockey circles following his public coming out. Blasi described Burke's presence as a "blessing," creating awareness within the program about homophobia. TSN sportscaster James Cybulski commented that the reaction to Burke's story, and that it was a major story in the first place, demonstrated the need for Burke and his whole family to stand tall as a major step forward for all minorities. GlobeSports.com's podcast Hockey Roundtable featured a discussion between sports writers Eric Duhatschek and James Mirtle about the dialogue concerning openly gay athletes and high-profile employees in major hockey franchises that resulted from Burke's interview about his struggles with hiding his sexuality and eventual coming out. Duhatschek commented that NHL players were reluctant to discuss the recent news and the subject in general, attributing it to a culture of machismo in professional sports. Assistant coach of the Phoenix Coyotes, David King, stated that he felt that like athletic sports' role in breaking down the racial barrier, sports would do the same for gay athletes, albeit stressing that he felt it "would take some time." Mirtle agreed, discussing the challenges of prejudice that closeted and out hockey athletes may face and highlighting NBA star John Amaechi's 2007 coming out as an example of strong anti-gay attitudes in the NBA and larger sports world.

== Death and legacy ==
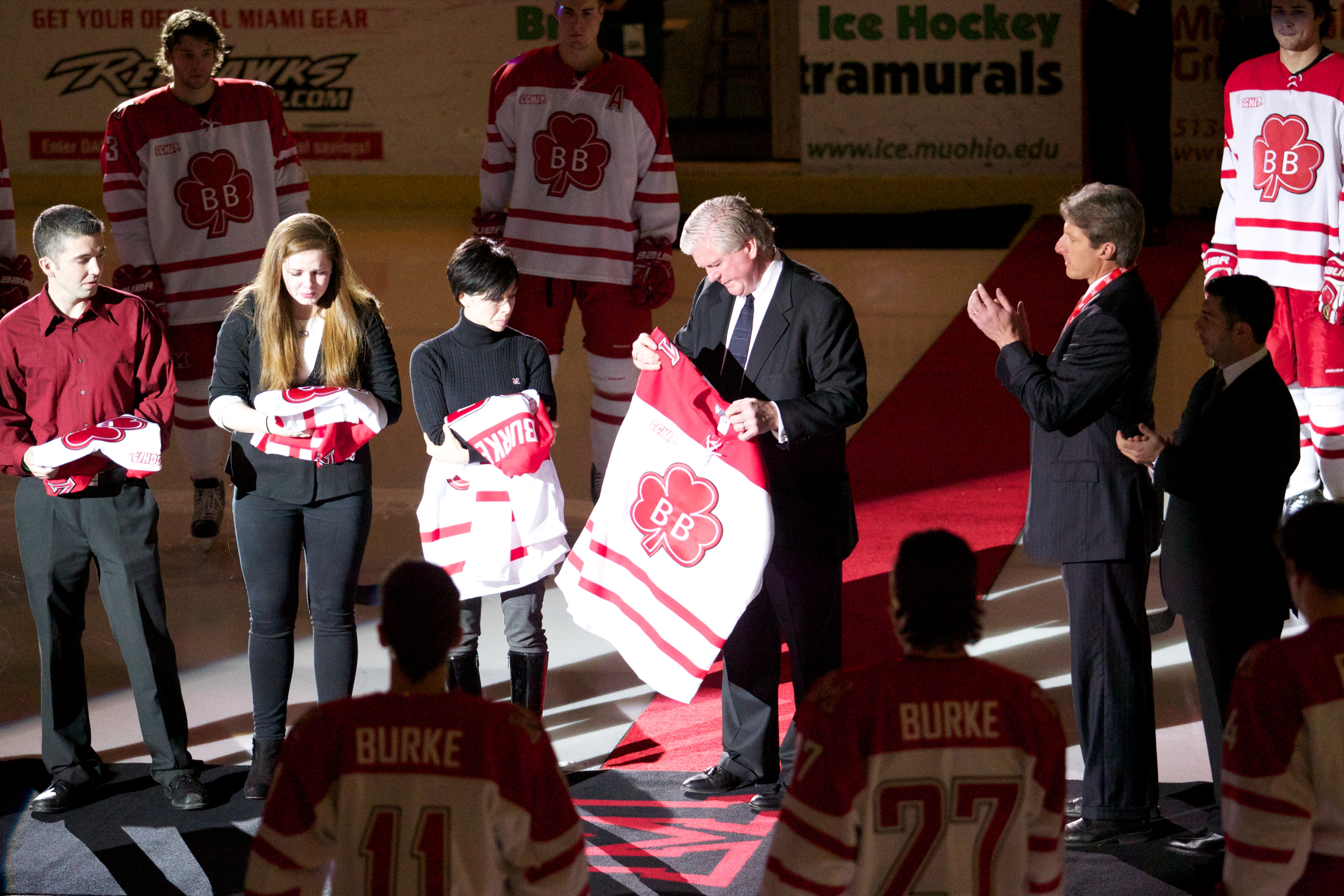
On February 5, 2011, the one-year anniversary of Burke's death, Brian Burke and his family are presented with special hockey sweaters in commemoration of Brendan Burke, which the RedHawks wore during their game that evening.

Burke died February 5, 2010, at the age of 21 in an automobile accident. While he was driving in heavy snow near Economy, Indiana, his 2004 Jeep Grand Cherokee slid sideways into the path of an oncoming 1997 Ford F-150 truck, killing him and his friend, Mark Reedy, a Michigan State University athlete, who was in the passenger seat. The impact of the collision fractured the base of Burke's skull, killing him instantly. The vehicle was mangled to such an extent that police officers and paramedics could not tell that Reedy was inside the vehicle, dead as well.

A moment of silence was observed prior to the Toronto Maple Leafs vs. Ottawa Senators game on February 6, 2010. Another moment of silence was also observed prior to the Miami University hockey game vs. Lake Superior State on February 6, 2010. The team also named him honorary first star of the game. The St. Louis Blues also held a moment of silence for Brendan Burke prior to their game against the Chicago Blackhawks on February 21, 2010.

The funeral was held at St. John the Evangelist Catholic church in Canton, Massachusetts, where his family lives, with nearly 1,000 people, including the full roster of the Toronto Maple Leafs and the Miami University Hockey Redhawks, in attendance. In April 2010, USA Hockey established the "Brendan Burke Internship" in honor of his work in hockey, describing it as being given annually to a recent college graduate seeking to pursue a career in hockey operations. The senior class of 2010 at Brendan's high school alma mater coordinated a fundraising campaign to donate a statue to be displayed on the Xaverian Brothers High School campus in memory of Brendan. On November 26, 2010, the Canadian Broadcasting Corporation television newsmagazine the fifth estate aired "The Legacy of Brendan Burke", a documentary detailing Burke's story and the discussion it generated about homophobia in hockey.

During the 2010 Winter Olympics in Vancouver, British Columbia, Canada, the United States Men's Hockey Team wore dog tags inscribed with the words "In Memory of Brendan Burke". In June 2010, Chicago Blackhawks president John McDonough announced that he would be sending the team's recently won Stanley Cup with defenseman Brent Sopel who would march in the 2010 Chicago Gay Pride Parade. Sopel began his NHL career with Vancouver and became friends with Brian Burke when he was the general manager there. Although he was traded to Atlanta earlier in the week, Sopel honored Brendan Burke by using his day with the Stanley Cup to display it in the Chicago Gay Pride Parade, stating to the press that honoring Burke's legacy and his father's example of familial support and tolerance was one of his reasons for marching in the parade. In recognition of the one-year anniversary of Burke's death, the Blackhawks wore special sweaters during their weekend game on February 5, 2011.

In the wake of Brendan's death, James Mirtle wrote in an article in The Globe and Mail published after Burke's death that he "was widely hailed as a pioneer in a sport that has never had an openly out athlete." He was also described as "the closest person to the NHL ever to come out publicly and say that he is gay." Assistant coach of the RedHawks Nick Petraglia attested to the commonplace use of gay slurs in hockey culture and stated that Burke's coming out impacted their program in addressing homophobia. The New England Hockey Journal also wrote that Burke would be remembered as a pioneer for addressing the issue of homophobia in hockey. Andrew Sobotka, president of the Chicago Gay Hockey Association, attributed a doubling in the organization's membership to Burke's legacy and the Cup's appearance at the 2010 Gay Pride parade, describing the continued debate about gays in hockey as "everyone carrying his [Brendan Burke's] torch."

Burke's older brother Patrick Burke announced in a column on Outsports.com that the Burke family promised their "unwavering, unremitting, relentless support" for the cause of equality in sports and to continue working to end homophobia in hockey. Since Brendan's death, his father has continued advocating against homophobia in professional sports, giving speeches at schools, marching in the annual Toronto Pride Parade, and working with former NFL commissioner Paul Tagliabue, whose son is also openly gay, through PFLAG. In March 2012, in tribute to Brendan, Patrick and Brian Burke founded the You Can Play campaign to fight homophobia in sports.
