= You Can Play =

Organization fighting homophobia in sports

- Formation: March 4, 2012; 14 years ago
- Type: Activism
- Purpose: Eradication of homophobia in sports
- Key people: Patrick Burke; Wade Davis; Brian Kitts; Glenn Witman; Brian Burke
- Website: youcanplay.org

You Can Play is a social activism campaign that aims to eliminate homophobia in sports, based on the slogan, "If you can play, you can play." The campaign was launched on March 4, 2012, by three co-founders: Patrick Burke (a scout for the Philadelphia Flyers and son of Brian Burke), Brian Kitts, and Glenn Witman (both affiliated with GForce Sports). The death of Brendan Burke, son of Brian and brother of Patrick, played a significant role in inspiring the campaign. Notably, "You Can Play" is an official partner of the National Hockey League, with Wade Davis serving as the former executive director of the organization. Presently, Wade Davis holds the position of Director of Professional Sports.

== Background ==
Prior to his death, Brendan Burke was renowned for his dedicated efforts to combat homophobia within the hockey community. Brendan served as a student manager for the Miami University RedHawks hockey team and gained significant recognition when he publicly came out as a gay man in 2009. His coming-out story was shared through an article written by John Buccigross and published on ESPN.com. Brendan and his father, Brian, appeared together on the Canadian channel TSN during a nationally televised hockey game intermission, where they openly discussed Brendan's sexuality and his father's acceptance of him.

During the interview, Brendan said, "I think it's important my story is told to people because there are a lot of gay athletes out there and gay people working in pro sports that deserve to know there are safe environments where people are supportive regardless of your sexual orientation."

Brendan died on February 5, 2010, in a car accident. He was only 21 years old, leaving behind a legacy of bravery, advocacy, and a sincere desire for inclusivity in sports.

Brian and Patrick continued to combat homophobia in the NHL after Brendan's death; Patrick, along with Brian Kitts and Glenn Witman, founded You Can Play as a tribute to his brother. The name You Can Play originates from a piece Patrick Burke wrote for outsports.com. In the piece, Patrick talks about the overwhelmingly positive experience surrounding Brendan's coming out: "I waited to get a negative email, or to read a damning article, or to hear a snide comment at a game. I waited, and I waited, and I waited ... and I got what I should have expected the entire time: love, support, and admiration." He talks of letters and emails that poured in to his family, and he also talks of fellow scouts and hockey personnel pulling him aside and giving their support. He summarizes his feelings in the revelation that across the hockey world, what matters is whether or not you can play. "If you can play, we welcome you." The quote was adapted to the catchier "If you can play, you can play" by the campaign.

You Can Play had its genesis in early 2011 at an event at the University of Denver, at which Glenn Witman had asked Patrick to be a guest speaker. Witman also invited Brian, and their casual conversations led to the eventual founding and launch of You Can Play.

== Launch ==
On March 4, 2012, the You Can Play Project released a video called "The Faceoff". In it, Patrick Burke and Brian Burke introduced the You Can Play Project, stating that their aim is to "carry on [Brendan's] legacy, and ensure that LGBT athletes around the world are afforded equal opportunity; judged only by their talent, character, and work ethic in their sport." The video features appearances from prominent NHL players Rick Nash, Duncan Keith, Claude Giroux, Matt Moulson, Daniel Alfredsson, Corey Perry, Henrik Lundqvist, and other popular NHL players. The video was uploaded to YouTube and aired during a Bruins-Rangers game. It was produced by HBO and aired originally by NBC. "The Faceoff" won the 2012 GLAAD Amplifier Award.

== Organization ==
The You Can Play Advisory Board includes Brian Burke, ESPN SportsCenter anchor John Buccigross, Miami University head hockey coach Enrico Blasi, Kraft Sports Group Vice President of Customer Marketing & Strategy Jessica Gelman, ESPN columnist LZ Granderson, Olympic soccer player Angela Hucles, Be The Change president and CEO Kevin Jennings, Andy Miele of the Grand Rapids Griffins/Detroit Red Wings, sports psychologist Dana Sinclair, AEG Vice President Kelly Staley, professional soccer player David Testo, Chicago Blackhawks forward Tommy Wingels, and Golden State Warriors president Rick Welts. In February 2013, the Advisory Board added transgender activist and baseball analyst Christina Kahrl and former NFL players Wade Davis and Esera Tuaolo. Miele and Wingels were the founding donors of You Can Play.

On August 20, 2013, Patrick Burke stepped aside as the main voice of You Can Play and named Wade Davis executive director of the organization. Burke remained with the organization in a less public role until March 2017, when he stepped down from the organization completely. In September 2016, Chris Mosier joined the organization as Vice President of Program Development and Community Relations and Wade Davis moved from Executive Director to Director of Professional Sports.

== Goals ==
You Can Play aims to rid professional sports of "casual homophobia" in the locker room. Their approach emphasizes education rather than punishment or blame.

The You Can Play mission statement reads as follows:

You Can Play is dedicated to ensuring equality, respect and safety for all athletes, without regard to sexual orientation and/or gender identity.

You Can Play works to guarantee that athletes are given a fair opportunity to compete, judged by other athletes and fans alike, only by what they contribute to the sport or their team's success.

You Can Play seeks to challenge the culture of locker rooms and spectator areas by focusing only on an athlete's skills, work ethic and competitive spirit.

Patrick Burke has been quoted as saying, "The end goal of our project is that we're completely useless. We want the day to come when it's not a story when an athlete comes out, when athletes are only judged by how they can help their teams win." In March 2012, Burke stated that he believed the NHL would see a current player come out within the next two years.

The You Can Play website promotes an initiative called the "Captain's Challenge," encouraging team captains from various sports, no matter the level of competition, to sign a form in support of You Can Play and its message. The challenge reads:

As a team captain, I pledge to respect the talents and work of all my teammates. I will encourage my teammates to speak up for each other when confronted with slurs of any sort in the locker room or on the playing field. And I'll start discussions that promote the acceptance of all of my teammates in order to build trust and a winning ethic.

You Can Play intends to release a playbook about casual homophobia as a resource for athletes and sports officials to help ensure safety for LGBT people in their communities.

== Supporters ==
=== NHL ===
The following NHL players and personnel have publicly endorsed You Can Play and/or acceptance of gay players in professional hockey:

- (Sweden) Daniel Alfredsson
- (United States) David Backes
- (Canada) Patrice Bergeron
- (Denmark) Mikkel Bødker
- (United States) Brian Boyle
- (Canada) Tyler Bozak
- (Canada) Tim Brent
- (United States) Dustin Brown
- (Canada) Brent Burns
- (United States) Dustin Byfuglien
- (United States) Ryan Callahan
- (Canada) Brian Campbell
- (Slovakia) Zdeno Chára
- (Canada) Casey Cizikas
- (Canada) Cal Clutterbuck
- (Canada) Logan Couture
- (United States) Charlie Coyle
- (Canada) Sidney Crosby
- (Canada) Shane Doan
- (Canada) Jordan Eberle
- (Canada) Brian Elliott
- (United States) Mark Fayne
- (Canada) Andrew Ference
- (United States) TJ Galiardi
- (Canada) Jason Garrison
- (United States) Brian Gionta
- (Canada) Claude Giroux
- (Canada) Tanner Glass
- (United States) Tim Gleason
- (United States) Andy Greene
- (Canada) Scott Hartnell
- (United States) Matt Hendricks
- (Canada) Braden Holtby
- (Canada) Zach Hyman
- (Canada) Ryan Jones
- (Canada) Nazem Kadri
- (Canada) Duncan Keith
- (United States) Ryan Kesler
- (Canada) Travis Konecny
- (United States) Mike Knuble
- (Canada) Chris Kunitz
- (Sweden) Eddie Läck
- (Sweden) Gabriel Landeskog
- (Canada) Scott Laughton
- (Sweden) Henrik Lundqvist
- (Canada) Joffrey Lupul
- (Canada) Manny Malhotra
- (Canada) Brad Marchand
- (United States) Alec Martinez
- (Canada) Curtis McKenzie
- (United States) Andy Miele
- (Canada) Brenden Morrow
- (United States) David Moss
- (Canada) Matt Moulson
- (Sweden) Douglas Murray
- (Canada) Rick Nash
- (Denmark) Frans Nielsen
- (Sweden) Anders Nilsson
- (United States) Brooks Orpik
- (United States) Zach Parise
- (United States) George Parros
- (Canada) David Perron
- (Canada) Corey Perry
- (Canada) Dion Phaneuf
- (United States) Jason Pominville
- (Canada) Carey Price
- (Canada) Brandon Prust
- (Finland) Tuomo Ruutu
- (Sweden) Henrik Sedin
- (Canada) Andrew Shaw
- (United States) Ben Smith
- (Canada) Brent Sopel
- (Canada) Matt Stajan
- (Canada) Steven Stamkos
- (United States) David Steckel
- (Canada) Joe Thornton
- (Canada) Chris Tierney
- (Canada) Jonathan Toews
- (United States) Jacob Trouba
- (United States) RJ Umberger
- (United States) James van Riemsdyk
- (United States) Trevor van Riemsdyk
- (Canada) Shea Weber
- (Canada) Kevin Westgarth
- (United States) Ryan Whitney
- (United States) Tommy Wingels
- (United States) Colin Wilson
- (Canada) W. Brett Wilson (Predators owner)
- (United States) Keith Yandle
- (Norway) Mats Zuccarello

Brian Burke appeared on TVOntario in July 2012 to talk about You Can Play. In response to a question about whether the NHL is ready to accept gay players, he said, "Before we started, we went to the NHL and said, 'Does this have your support?' and Gary Bettman was like, 'Absolutely.' He knew Brendan, and he was like, 'Absolutely, that day can't come soon enough.'" On April 11, 2013, the NHL and NHLPA announced an official partnership with You Can Play, including a commitment to educate prospects on LGBT issues and provide avenues for players to seek confidential counseling related to sexual orientation.

Landeskog's support in January 2014 made history because it meant that each National Hockey League team had at least one player supporting The You Can Play Project. In December 2016, Anders Nilsson began wearing a mask with a gay pride flag painted on the back as a sign that ice hockey welcomes diversity, drawing praise from Wade Davis for "taking a risk on multiple fronts and standing up for something that he believes in, knowing the backlash that could come his way."

On February 2, 2017, the NHL and its partners announced as part of Hockey is for Everyone month that each of its 30 member teams will have one player designated as a You Can Play ambassador. In June 2019, Kurtis Gabriel became the first NHL player to play a game while using Pride Tape, which was usually saved only for warmups.

=== AHL and the You Can Play Pledge ===
Several American Hockey League teams have created videos for You Can Play and/or taken the You Can Play Pledge, a pledge to support the campaign's principles signed by the entire organization. These teams include:

- The Albany Devils
- The Bridgeport Sound Tigers
- The Charlotte Checkers
- The Hamilton Bulldogs
- The Manchester Monarchs
- The Peoria Rivermen
- The Portland Pirates
- The Providence Bruins
- The Rochester Americans
- The Toronto Marlies

=== Post-Secondary Institutions ===
A number of colleges and universities from across North America and Canada have contributed videos to the campaign. This list includes:

- The America East Conference
- Amherst College
- Bates College
- Bowdoin College
- Brown University
- Bryant University
- Colorado College women's soccer and men's basketball
- Connecticut College
- Cornell University
- Dartmouth College
- Duke University
- Georgetown University
- George Washington University
- Grand Valley State University
- Louisiana State University
- Memorial University of Newfoundland
- Miami University
- Northeastern University
- The Ohio State University
- Portland State University Campus Rec
- Princeton University
- Rensselaer Polytechnic Institute
- Ryerson University
- St. Thomas University (New Brunswick)
- Stanford University
- UCLA
- University at Buffalo hockey
- University of Alberta
- University of California, Berkeley
- University of Cincinnati
- University of Connecticut
- University of Denver
- University of Missouri
- University of New Brunswick
- University of Notre Dame
- University of Ottawa
- University of Vermont
- Wheaton College (Massachusetts)

=== Other leagues ===
In March 2012, the Soo Greyhounds of the Ontario Hockey League became the first Major Junior team to contribute to the You Can Play project.

On October 12, 2012, You Can Play published a video from DC United of Major League Soccer. This was the campaign's first public service announcement from a professional sports league outside of the NHL, as well as the first outside of hockey. Two months later Toronto FC became the second MLS team, and the first Canadian soccer team, to support You Can Play. The following year, in 2013, Major League Soccer and the Major League Soccer Players Union partnered with You Can Play. "The diversity found in our league has always been a point of pride for us," said MLS Commissioner Don Garber. "We are proud to partner with You Can Play to ensure that all of our fans and players know that MLS is committed to providing a safe environment where everyone is treated equally, and with dignity and respect."

On December 20, 2012, You Can Play announced an official partnership with the Canadian Women's Hockey League. In a statement, Patrick Burke said, "LGBT female athletes face a different set of problems than male athletes, but those problems are no less serious. This partnership will encourage both LGBT athletes and their numerous straight allies to speak up for each other, without fear of recrimination from teammates, coaches, fans, or sponsors." The CWHL is the first league to partner with You Can Play.

In February 2013 the Colorado Mammoth became the first National Lacrosse League team to support You Can Play. Later that year the Denver Outlaws joined the Mammoth in becoming the second NLL team to support the project. In February 2019, the Toronto Rock held their first Pride Night in support of You Can Play.

In March 2013 the San Francisco Bulls of the ECHL became the first team in that league to partner with the You Can Play project.

In June 2013 Seattle Reign FC of the National Women's Soccer League published a video in support of the project, becoming "the first professional women's team in the United States to speak on behalf of You Can Play."

The Denver Nuggets became the first National Basketball Association team to partner with You Can Play in January 2014. One of the three Nuggets players who appeared in the video, Kenneth Faried, was already "a vocal supporter of equality" before joining the You Can Play project.

In June 2017, U.S. Soccer partnered with You Can Play. The U.S. Men's and Women's National Teams wore pride-inspired rainbow numbers during the June friendlies. One set of game-issued jerseys from each team was auctioned for You Can Play.

=== Other supporters ===
In April 2012, The Sports Network released a You Can Play video wherein James Duthie, Darren Dreger, Pierre LeBrun, and Bob McKenzie promised to cover LGBT athletes without sensationalizing their sexual orientations.

Akil Patterson, a former University of Maryland athlete and aspiring Olympian in Greco-Roman wrestling, contributed a video to the project, talking in detail about his struggles with addiction and his own sexuality.

Jon Cornish of the Calgary Stampeders received media attention in 2012 when, after a practice during Grey Cup week, he revealed to reporters that his mother was a lesbian. His open admission of his mother's sexual orientation was part of a growing trend of acceptance of homosexuality and gave him "a seat at the head table of the You Can Play movement." Then, in late 2013, Cornish released his own 15-second video of support for the project, in which he said he "is proud to support LGBT athletes everywhere."

The band Fun joined the list of celebrity supporters when its video was published in November 2013. Each member of the band discussed his respective aspirations to be an athlete if he was not in the music industry, and stressed the fact that together the group "make[s] music for everyone."

Rapper Macklemore of Macklemore & Ryan Lewis added a video to the project, in which he talked about the need to be welcoming to everyone and that homophobic language has no place in sports or music. The duo's song "Same Love" was about the subject of homosexuality and gay rights, and was a success on charts around the world.

In December 2014, the You Can Play foundation and Egale Canada partnered with the Canadian Olympic Committee in a new program to combat homophobia in sports within the Olympic committee's mandate.

== Challenges ==
Since You Can Play has gained widespread support and recognition by North American professional leagues, they have been called to comment on challenging instances of homophobia involving professional athletes.

=== Cam Janssen ===
In July 2012, Cam Janssen of the New Jersey Devils appeared on an internet radio talk show, making several derogatory and threatening jokes involving women, gay-bashing, and his role on his team as an enforcer. After speaking with Patrick Burke, Janssen apologized for his comments and expressed his support for You Can Play, and the campaign released a statement saying they believe Janssen's apology to be sincere.

=== Yunel Escobar ===
On September 15, 2012, Yunel Escobar, then a shortstop for the Toronto Blue Jays, played a game with a homophobic slur written in Spanish across his eye black. In response, the Blue Jays suspended their player for three games. Twelve days later, Yunel sat down with Patrick Burke and LGBT athlete Jose Estevez to discuss the incident. Patrick Burke left the meeting feeling confident in the interaction between Yunel and Jose. He is quoted as saying: "I thought the meeting was very productive. Yunel seemed genuinely interested in what Jose had to say, and appeared to really take it to heart. I think Jose did a tremendous job of making Yunel fully grasp the implications behind his actions."

=== Chris Culliver ===
Just prior to the 2013 Super Bowl, Chris Culliver of the San Francisco 49ers responded as follows to an interview question about whether he had any gay teammates: "We don't have any gay guys on the team ... They gotta get up outta here if they do. Can't be with that sweet stuff." You Can Play, GLAAD, and Athlete Ally released a joint statement condemning these views. Culliver subsequently apologized and pledged to grow from the experience.

=== Sochi Olympics ===
The 2014 Winter Olympics caused a stir given the controversial status of LGBT rights in Russia, the host country, that prevented gay propaganda from being spread, and threatened jail time and punishment for those who disobeyed the law. You Can Play sought out many options aimed at protesting the Games, but none were viable options because of the fine line "between advocating" for the LGBT community, "and exploiting" it. Instead they worked with groups who would not only be able to do work during the Olympics, but continue to do work once the Games finished. Another decision You Can Play made was to partner with Grantland, which was not without controversy. Grantland was criticized after it ran an article revealing the transsexual background of a doctor without her consent, which needed two follow up pieces from the editor-in-chief as well as a contributor, who is also on the board of directors of GLAAD, to explain why the story was run. After discussing both internally and with supporters, however, You Can Play made the decision to remain partnered with Grantland for the duration of the Olympic Games. You Can Play's role was to provide the link between the sports perspective in the stories and the LGBT community's perspective.

=== Andrew Shaw ===
On April 19, 2016, during Game 4 of the Chicago Blackhawks' first-round series against the St. Louis Blues, Andrew Shaw was penalized for interference with 2:04 remaining in the third period while the Blackhawks down by a goal. He was recorded using an anti-gay slur during a tirade in the penalty box, and the recording circulated widely on social media. As a result, the NHL suspended him for Game 5, fined him $5,000 for related hand gestures, and ordered him to undergo sensitivity training. The following day Shaw apologized to the gay and lesbian community saying "That's not the type of guy I am" and that "I have no excuses for ..." getting caught up in the heat of the competition. After the press conference, Shaw personally apologized to Chicago Tribune reporter Chris Hine, who is gay. Blackhawks captain Jonathan Toews, who had previously recorded a You Can Play video, said the incident was a learning experience for Shaw. After being traded to the Montreal Canadiens during the off-season, Shaw volunteered to be the team's ambassador to You Can Play as "a leader in the locker room and in the community on diversity, equality and inclusion." The announcement was met by skepticism by some.

== See also ==
- Homosexuality in sports
- Homophobia
- LGBT rights movement
- Principle 6 campaign
