= Tyler Toffoli =

Canadian ice hockey player (born 1992)

- Toffoli with the San Jose Sharks in 2026
- Born: April 24, 1992 (age 34) Scarborough, Ontario, Canada
- Height: 6 ft 0 in (183 cm)
- Weight: 205 lb (93 kg; 14 st 9 lb)
- Position: Forward
- Shoots: Right
- NHL team Former teams: San Jose Sharks; Los Angeles Kings; Vancouver Canucks; Montreal Canadiens; Calgary Flames; New Jersey Devils; Winnipeg Jets
- National team: Canada
- NHL draft: 47th overall, 2010; Los Angeles Kings
- Playing career: 2011–present

Tyler Toffoli (/təˈfoʊliː/ tə-FOH-lee; born April 24, 1992) is a Canadian professional ice hockey player who is a forward and alternate captain for the San Jose Sharks of the National Hockey League (NHL). He was selected in the second round, 47th overall, by the Los Angeles Kings in the 2010 NHL entry draft and won the Stanley Cup with the Kings in 2014. Since his trade from the Kings in 2020, Toffoli has also played for the Winnipeg Jets, Calgary Flames, Montreal Canadiens, New Jersey Devils, and Vancouver Canucks.

== Early life ==
Toffoli was born in Scarborough, Ontario, to Rob and Mandy Toffoli; he has two older sisters Megan and Courtney. His father Rob was also involved in hockey and was the general manager of the Toronto Jr. Canadiens while Toffoli played with them. Growing up, Toffoli attended Birchmount Park Collegiate Institute in Toronto (into which Scarborough had amalgamated in 1998) and Hillcrest High School in Ottawa.

== Playing career ==
=== Major junior ===
Toffoli was drafted seventh overall by the Ottawa 67's in the 2008 OHL draft. At the conclusion of his rookie season, Toffoli was named to the First All-Rookie Team.

In 2010, Toffoli was drafted 169th overall by Traktor Chelyabinsk in the 2010 KHL draft but chose to stay in the OHL. He was later drafted 47th overall by the Los Angeles Kings in the 2010 NHL entry draft.

Toffoli signed a three-year entry-level contract with the Kings on April 19, 2011. He played that season with the 67's before joining the Manchester Monarchs in the American Hockey League to begin his professional career.

=== Los Angeles Kings ===
On March 16, 2013, Toffoli made his NHL debut in a 5–2 win over the San Jose Sharks. Toffoli scored his first career NHL goal on goaltender Mike Smith in his second NHL game in a 4–0 victory over the Phoenix Coyotes on March 18, 2013. On April 12, 2013, Toffoli was named the recipient of the AHL's Dudley "Red" Garrett Memorial Award for rookie of the year in the 2012–13 season. He scored 28 goals and 20 assists (48 points) in 55 AHL games for Manchester during the season, and upon the announcement, Toffoli led all rookies in goals, short-handed goals (3) and plus-minus (+20).

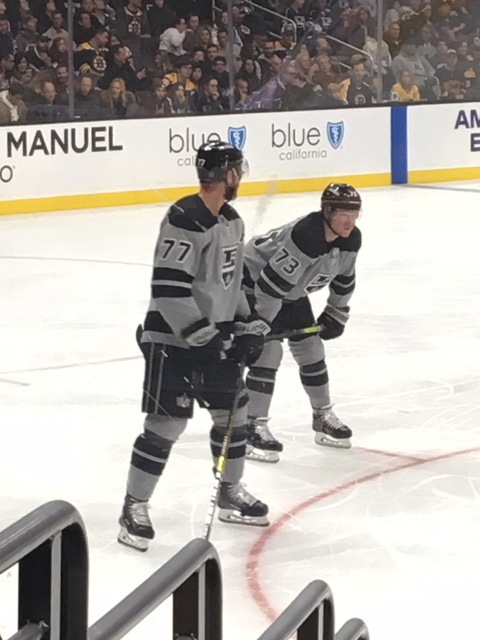
Toffoli (background) with Jeff Carter during a Kings game in February 2019.

On May 8, 2013, Toffoli made his Stanley Cup playoff debut in game five of the Western Conference quarterfinals against the St. Louis Blues, replacing scratched Keaton Ellerby in the Kings' lineup.

To begin the 2013–14 season, the Kings assigned Toffoli to their AHL team in Manchester. On November 9, in his third game since being recalled to the NHL with Manchester linemate Linden Vey, Toffoli scored two goals and one assist in Los Angeles' 5–1 victory over the Vancouver Canucks, the first three-point game of his NHL career. Toffoli then contributed another two-goal performance, including the eventual game-winner, against the St. Louis Blues, on December 2 in a 3–2 Kings victory. The game-winning goal marked his fourth in 14 games since he had been recalled from the Monarchs. Toffoli was a key contributor in the playoffs and would go on to win the Stanley Cup, assisting on Alec Martinez's Stanley Cup winning goal in 2OT of game five.

In the 2014–15 season, Toffoli played a majority of the season with Jeff Carter and Tanner Pearson on a line dubbed "That 70s Line" because all three wore numbers in the 70s. During the 2014–15 season, on January 9, 2015, Toffoli was diagnosed with mononucleosis, forcing him to miss six games before rejoining the lineup on January 31 against the Chicago Blackhawks. He scored his first career NHL hat-trick on February 12 in the Kings' 5–2 victory over the Calgary Flames.

During the 2016–17 season, Toffoli suffered a left knee injury, forcing him to miss 19 games. He underwent successful surgery on April 25. On June 7, 2017, the Kings signed Toffoli to a three-year, $13.8 million extension, with an annual average of $4.6 million.

On February 15, 2020, Toffoli became the first player in league history to record a hat-trick in an outdoor game when the Kings defeated the Colorado Avalanche 3–1 during the 2020 NHL Stadium Series. The game was played at Falcon Stadium in Colorado Springs, Colorado.

=== Vancouver Canucks ===
However, two days later, Toffoli was traded by the Kings to the Vancouver Canucks on February 17, 2020, in exchange for Tim Schaller, Tyler Madden, a 2020 second-round pick, and a 2022 conditional pick. Toffoli found success on the Canucks' top line alongside J. T. Miller and Elias Pettersson, putting up 10 points in 10 games, including six goals. When the NHL season resumed for the playoffs, Toffoli would suffer a high-ankle sprain in game one of the qualifying series against the Minnesota Wild. He wouldn't return to the lineup until August 25, 2020, in time for game two of the second-round series against the Vegas Golden Knights. Toffoli contributed a goal and two assists in his return to the lineup as the Canucks tied the series. However, he had just one goal the rest of the series as the Canucks bowed out in seven games. Despite the Canucks having traded for Toffoli, the team's general manager, Jim Benning, did not attempt to re-sign him.

=== Montreal Canadiens ===
On October 12, 2020, Toffoli signed a four-year, $17 million contract with the Montreal Canadiens. In his first game against the Canucks on January 20, Toffoli recorded a hat-trick in a 6–5 shootout loss for the Canadiens. Toffoli managed 28 goals and 16 assists in 52 games during the pandemic-shortened 2020–21 season, the seventh-best goal tally for a player in the NHL that season. He continued to enjoy success during the Canadiens' deep run during the playoffs, notably scoring the series-winning goal in the team's second round against the Winnipeg Jets. Toffoli played in his second Stanley Cup Final, though he was struggling with a groin injury by the end of the playoffs and did not register any points in his final six games.

While the Canadiens had a historically poor start to the 2021–22 season, Toffoli recorded five goals and 12 assists in his first 26 games, jockeying for the overall points lead with Nick Suzuki. On December 11, it was announced that Toffoli had undergone hand surgery and was expected to miss eight weeks. However, due to a faster than expected recovery, Toffoli returned only a month later, managing a goal and an assist in a 5–3 victory over the Dallas Stars. With the team under the new management of Jeff Gorton and Kent Hughes, there was increasing speculation Toffoli would soon be traded as part of a rebuild. Speaking on the subject, Toffoli said, "I've been traded before and I know better not to get caught up in the rumours. Whatever direction they feel they want to go in, I want to be part of it." Following his subsequent trade, teammate Nick Suzuki commented "it's tough to lose a good friend and good teammate."

=== Calgary Flames ===
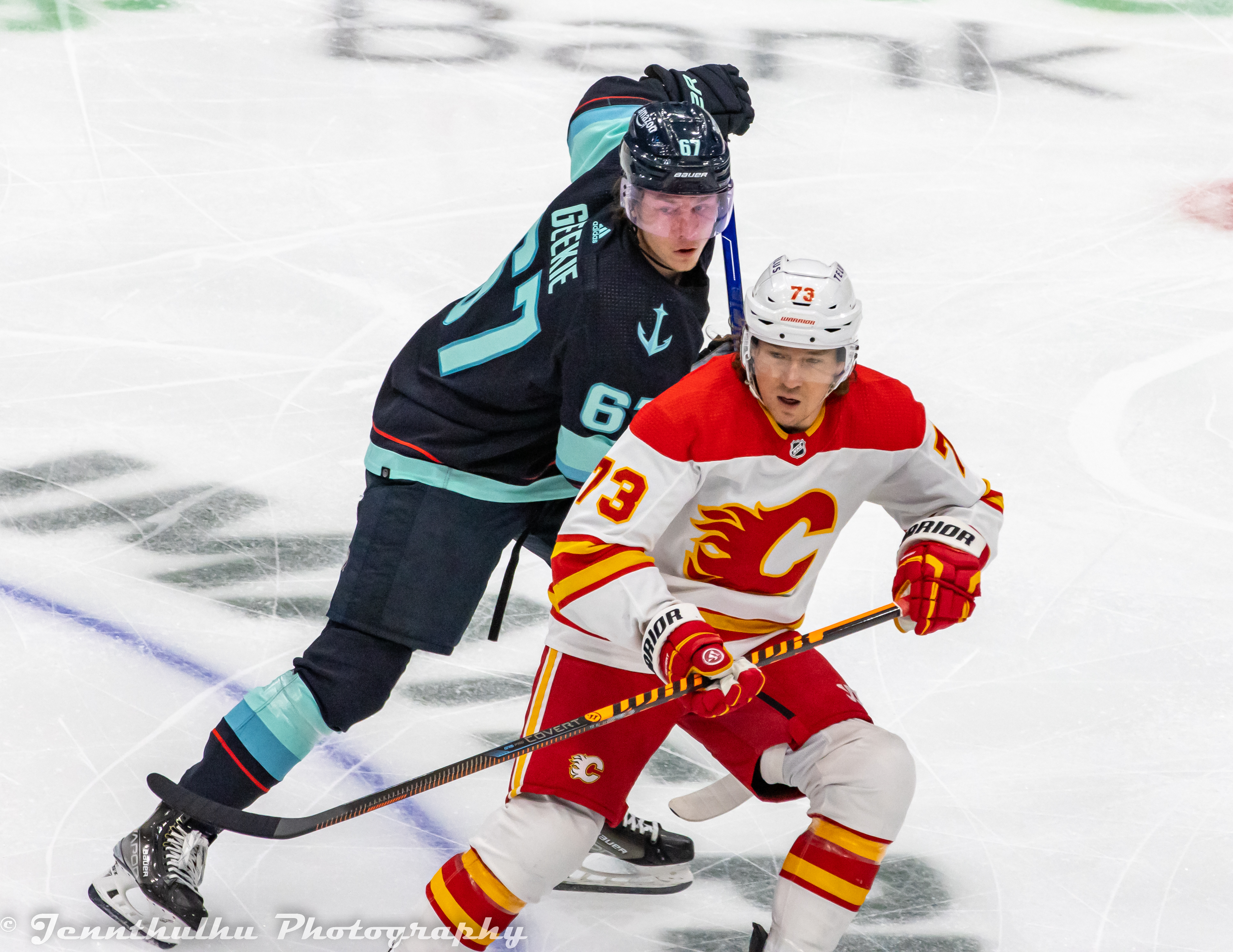
Toffoli in his second season with the Flames in December 2022.

On February 14, 2022, Toffoli was traded to the Calgary Flames for Tyler Pitlick, Emil Heineman, a first-round pick in 2022, and a fifth-round pick in 2023. The trade reunited him with former Kings coach Darryl Sutter and past teammates Trevor Lewis, Milan Lucic, Sean Monahan, Christopher Tanev and Jacob Markström. Making his Flames debut on February 15, he scored his first goal with the team that night in a 6–2 rout of the Columbus Blue Jackets. Toffoli scored seven goals in his first ten games with the team, but by the end of the regular season was on a pronounced scoring drought. The Flames won the Pacific Division, and advanced into the 2022 Stanley Cup playoffs to meet the Dallas Stars in the first round. Toffoli's scoring drought extended into the postseason, recording only a secondary assist in the first six games of the series, stymied by a stellar performance by Stars netminder Jake Oettinger. In game seven, Toffoli scored his first goal of the postseason, ending a 16-game goalless streak, helping the Flames win the series. The Flames drew the Edmonton Oilers in the second round, the first playoff "Battle of Alberta" in 31 years. The Flames were defeated by the Oilers in five games, bringing the playoff run to an end.

The offseason brought major changes for the Flames organization, with the departures of star wingers Johnny Gaudreau and Matthew Tkachuk. As a result, Toffoli was moved onto the team's top line alongside Elias Lindholm and newcomer Jonathan Huberdeau. He called it "a great opportunity." On December 7, 2022, Toffoli scored his 200th career NHL goal in a loss to the Carolina Hurricanes, Toffoli hit new career highs in goals (34) and points (73) for the season while leading the Flames in scoring. He was widely cited as a highlight of what was otherwise a disappointing year for the team, culminating in them failing to qualify for the 2023 Stanley Cup playoffs.

Following the disappointing season, the Flames organization saw significant changes in its staff, with both general manager Brad Treliving and coach Sutter departing. By late June it was reported that several players, including Lindholm, Mikael Backlund, and Noah Hanifin, had indicated they would be unlikely to re-sign with the team following the expiration of their contracts. On June 22, it was reported in the media that Toffoli had also requested to be traded.

=== New Jersey Devils ===
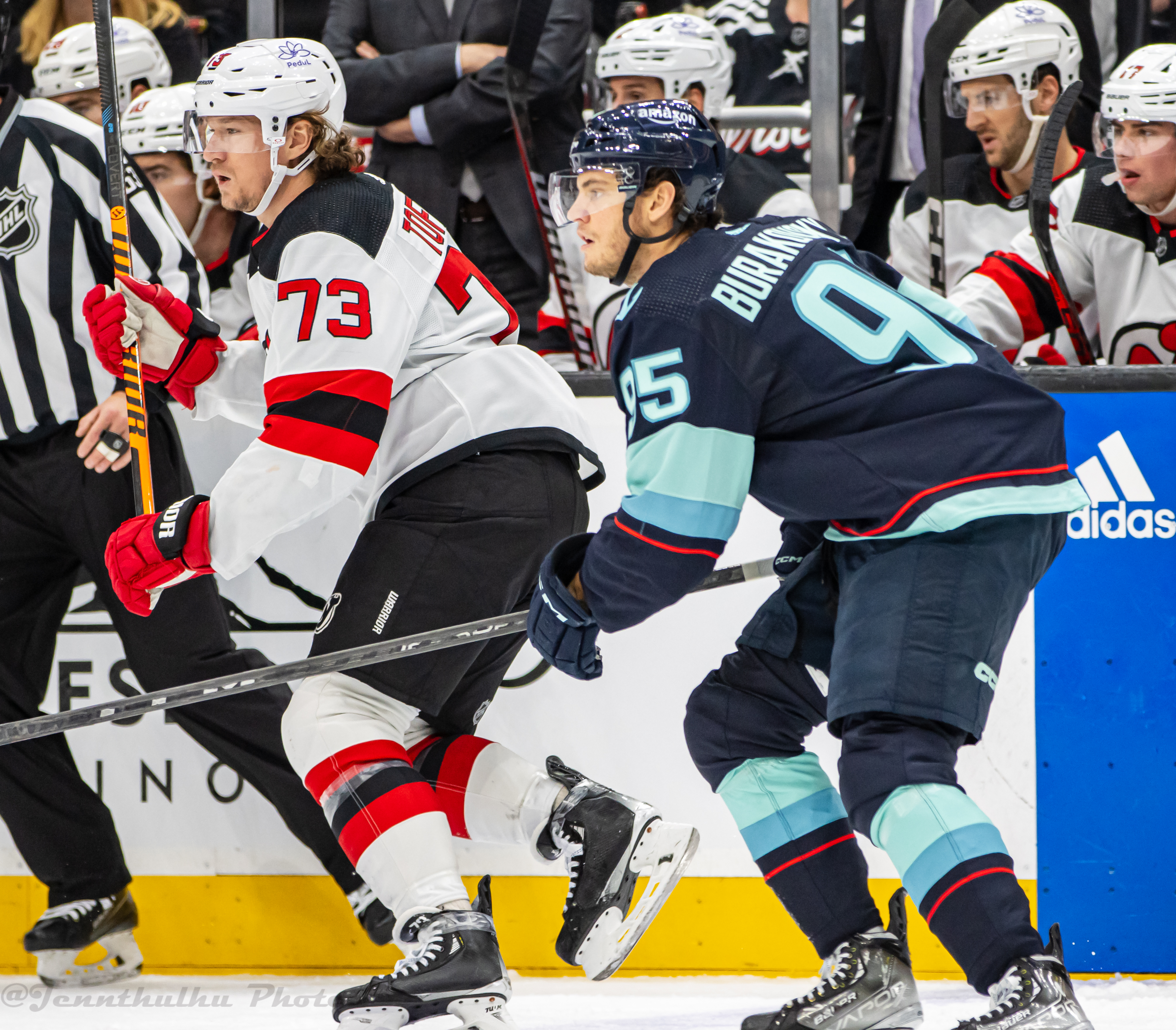
Toffoli in action with the Devils against the Seattle Kraken in December 2023.

On June 27, 2023, the Flames traded Toffoli to the New Jersey Devils, in exchange for Yegor Sharangovich and a 2023 third-round draft pick. Toffoli played 61 games for the Devils, recording 26 goals and 18 assists for 44 points.

=== Winnipeg Jets ===
On March 8, 2024, Toffoli was traded to the Winnipeg Jets in exchange for a 2024 third-round pick and a 2025 second-round pick. On March 15, 2024, Toffoli scored his first two goals as a Winnipeg Jet in a 6–0 Jets win against the visiting Anaheim Ducks. He would later add two more goals and an assist (his first as a Jet) two days later in a 6–1 Jets victory over the Columbus Blue Jackets.

=== San Jose Sharks ===
On July 1, 2024, Toffoli joined his seventh NHL club, after he signed as a free agent to a four-year, $24 million contract with the San Jose Sharks.

On October 8, 2025, Toffoli was named an alternate captain of the Sharks for the 2025–26 season, and was the only one to serve in the role for both home and road games. On October 28, he played in his 900th NHL game, against the Los Angeles Kings. On December 16, he scored his 300th NHL goal, and on December 23, he recorded two points, registering both his 300th NHL assist and his 600th NHL point.

On September 30, 2026, Toffoli was again named an alternate captain for the 2026–27 season, this time for road games only.

== International play ==
Medal record

Men's ice hockey

Representing Canada

World Championships
Gold medal – first place	2015 Czech Republic	
Gold medal – first place	2023 Finland/Latvia	

Following the Kings not qualifying for the 2015 Stanley Cup playoffs, Toffoli made his first international appearance with Canada, participating in the 2015 World Championship and winning the gold medal. Eight years later, after the Flames similarly missed the playoffs, Toffoli accepted an invitation to play at the 2023 World Championship. He was named the team captain, registered six points, and led the team to the gold medal.

== Personal life ==
Toffoli met his wife, Cat, in 2014 while she worked with the Los Angeles Dodgers and they were married in 2018. She helped create and co-hosts a podcast with Julie Petry wife of Minnesota Wild defenceman Jeff Petry in 2025. The pair have one dog, Stella.

Toffoli has shown support for the LGBTQ community, including acting as a special guest coach with Alexander Wennberg during the San Jose Sharks fourth annual Pride Scrimmage in March 2026 and attending Silicon Valley Pride with Cat.

== Career statistics ==
=== Regular season and playoffs ===
			Regular season					Playoffs
Season	Team	League	GP	G	A	Pts	PIM	GP	G	A	Pts	PIM
2007–08	Toronto Jr. Canadiens	OPJHL	2	2	0	2	0	—	—	—	—	—
2008–09	Ottawa 67's	OHL	54	17	29	46	16	7	2	6	8	4
2009–10	Ottawa 67's	OHL	65	37	42	79	54	12	7	6	13	10
2010–11	Ottawa 67's	OHL	68	57	51	108	33	4	3	5	8	4
2010–11	Manchester Monarchs	AHL	1	0	1	1	0	5	1	0	1	6
2011–12	Ottawa 67's	OHL	65	52	48	100	22	18	11	7	18	21
2012–13	Manchester Monarchs	AHL	58	28	23	51	18	—	—	—	—	—
2012–13	Los Angeles Kings	NHL	10	2	3	5	2	12	2	4	6	0
2013–14	Manchester Monarchs	AHL	18	15	8	23	4	—	—	—	—	—
2013–14	Los Angeles Kings	NHL	62	12	17	29	10	26	7	7	14	10
2014–15	Los Angeles Kings	NHL	76	23	26	49	37	—	—	—	—	—
2015–16	Los Angeles Kings	NHL	82	31	27	58	20	5	0	1	1	2
2016–17	Los Angeles Kings	NHL	63	16	18	34	22	—	—	—	—	—
2017–18	Los Angeles Kings	NHL	82	24	23	47	16	4	0	0	0	0
2018–19	Los Angeles Kings	NHL	82	13	21	34	23	—	—	—	—	—
2019–20	Los Angeles Kings	NHL	58	18	16	34	16	—	—	—	—	—
2019–20	Vancouver Canucks	NHL	10	6	4	10	4	7	2	2	4	0
2020–21	Montreal Canadiens	NHL	52	28	16	44	24	22	5	9	14	6
2021–22	Montreal Canadiens	NHL	37	9	17	26	4	—	—	—	—	—
2021–22	Calgary Flames	NHL	37	11	12	23	10	12	2	3	5	6
2022–23	Calgary Flames	NHL	82	34	39	73	28	—	—	—	—	—
2023–24	New Jersey Devils	NHL	61	26	18	44	12	—	—	—	—	—
2023–24	Winnipeg Jets	NHL	18	7	4	11	2	5	2	0	2	0
2024–25	San Jose Sharks	NHL	78	30	24	54	14	—	—	—	—	—
2025–26	San Jose Sharks	NHL	79	19	30	49	10	—	—	—	—	—
NHL totals			969	309	315	624	254	93	20	26	46	24

=== International ===
Year	Team	Event	Result	GP	G	A	Pts	PIM
2009	Canada Ontario	U17	1st place, gold medalist(s)	6	4	5	9	6
2015	Canada	WC	1st place, gold medalist(s)	10	2	3	5	2
2023	Canada	WC	1st place, gold medalist(s)	10	3	3	6	2
Junior totals				6	4	5	9	6
Senior totals				20	5	6	11	4

== Awards and honours ==
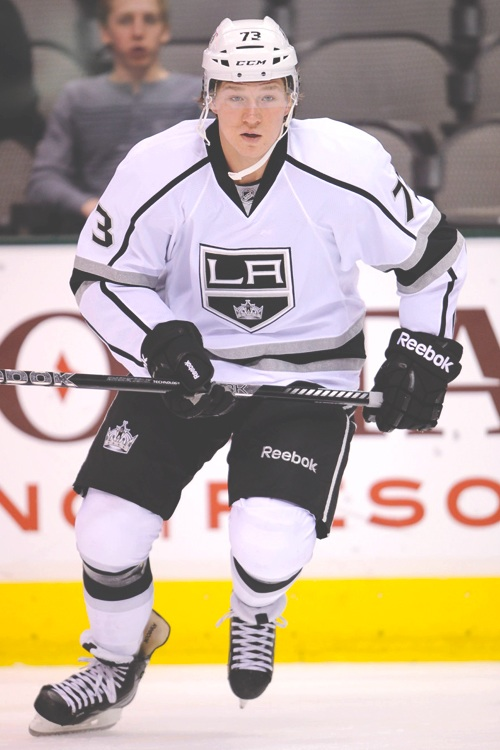
Toffoli during a game with the Kings in 2013.

Award	Year	Ref
OHL
First All-Rookie Team	2009	
CHL Top Prospects Game	2010	
All-Star Game	2010	
First All-Star Team	2011, 2012	
Eddie Powers Memorial Trophy	2011	
Jim Mahon Memorial Trophy	2011, 2012	
AHL
All-Star Game	2013	
All-Rookie Team	2013	
Dudley "Red" Garrett Memorial Award	2013	
NHL
Stanley Cup champion	2014	

Awards
Preceded by Cory Conacher	AHL Rookie of the Year; 2012–13	Succeeded by Curtis McKenzie
