= Jeff Carter =

Canadian ice hockey player (born 1985)

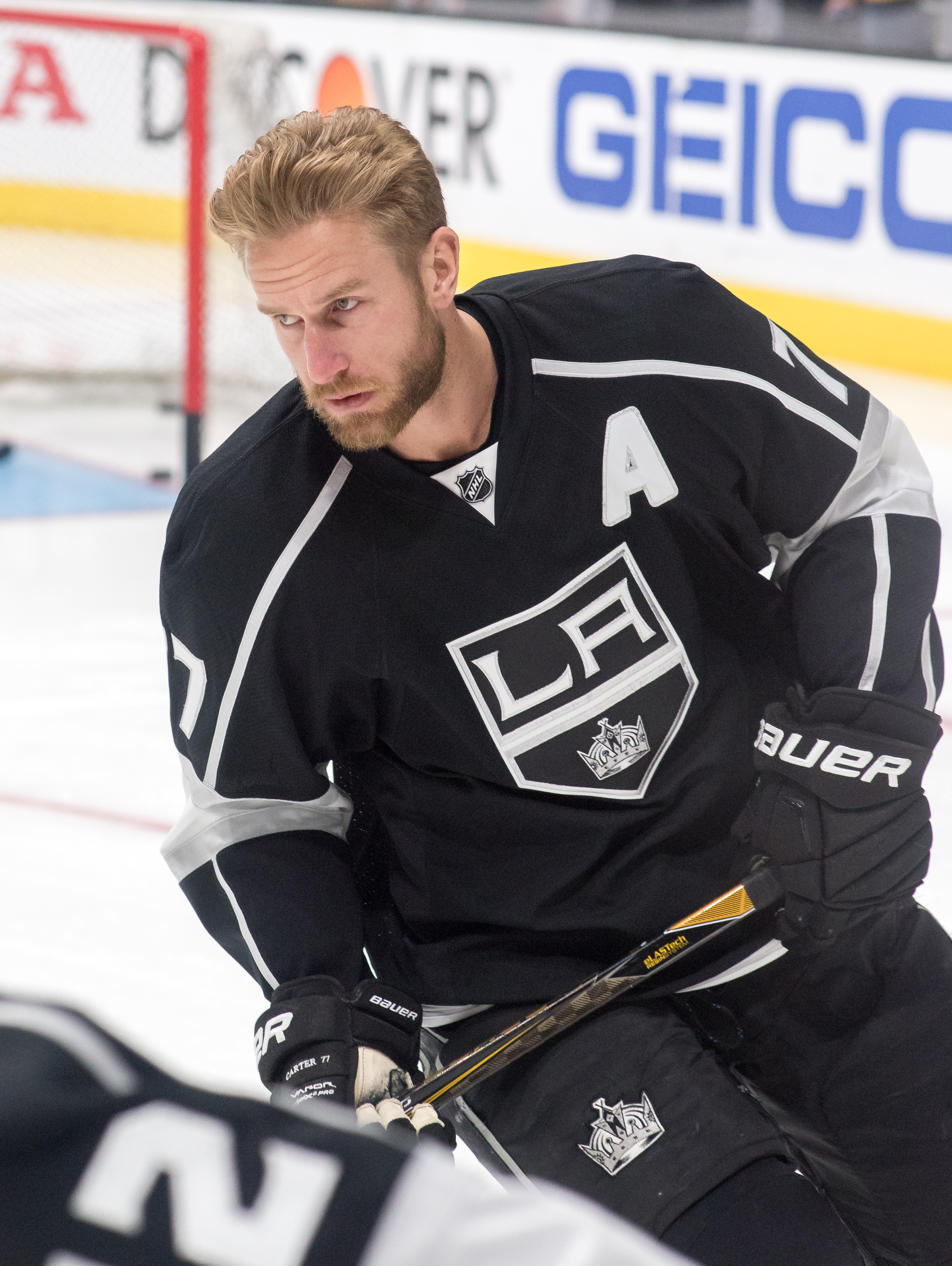
- Carter with the Los Angeles Kings in 2016
- Born: January 1, 1985 (age 41) London, Ontario, Canada
- Height: 6 ft 4 in (193 cm)
- Weight: 217 lb (98 kg; 15 st 7 lb)
- Position: Centre/Right wing
- Shot: Right
- Played for: Philadelphia Flyers; Columbus Blue Jackets; Los Angeles Kings; Pittsburgh Penguins
- National team: Canada
- NHL draft: 11th overall, 2003; Philadelphia Flyers
- Playing career: 2004–2024

Jeffrey J. Carter (born January 1, 1985) is a Canadian former professional ice hockey centre who played 19 seasons in the National Hockey League (NHL) for the Philadelphia Flyers, Columbus Blue Jackets, Los Angeles Kings, and Pittsburgh Penguins. He was drafted 11th overall by the Flyers in the 2003 NHL entry draft.

During his NHL career, he won the Stanley Cup in 2012 and 2014 (both with Los Angeles), appeared in two All-Star Games in 2009 and 2017, and led the Philadelphia Flyers – for whom he played six seasons – in scoring during their 2008–09 campaign; his 46 goals during that season were good for second overall in the NHL. Carter also played 39 games with the Columbus Blue Jackets during the 2011–12 season before being traded to Los Angeles.

Carter played junior hockey for the Sault Ste. Marie Greyhounds in the Ontario Hockey League. He was a First Team All-Star, William Hanley Trophy and CHL Sportsman of the Year honors in his final year. Joining the Flyers' American Hockey League (AHL) affiliate, the Philadelphia Phantoms, immediately after his junior career, he helped the team win the Calder Cup in 2005.

Internationally, Carter won gold medals with Team Canada at the under-18, under-20 levels and at the Winter Olympics. During his under-20 career, he tied as Canada's all-time leading scorer at the World Juniors and was named to back-to-back Tournament All-Star Teams. He has also represented Canada at the 2006 IIHF World Championship. Carter represented Canada at the 2014 Winter Olympics in Sochi, where he won a gold medal. His 92 game-winning goals is tied for 18th most in NHL history.

== Playing career ==
=== Early career ===
Carter played minor hockey in London, Ontario, with the London Jr. Knights rep program. He then played bantam hockey with the AAA Elgin-Middlesex Chiefs of the Ontario Minor Hockey Association (OMHA) before spending a season with the Strathroy Rockets, a Junior B team. While playing with Strathroy, Carter's teammates included Jared Keeso.

Carter was selected in the first round, 3rd overall, of the 2001 Ontario Hockey League (OHL) Priority Selection by the Sault Ste. Marie Greyhounds. He began his OHL career in 2001–02, recording 35 points over 63 games as a rookie. The following season, he improved to 71 points. In the off-season, the Philadelphia Flyers selected him 11th overall in the 2003 NHL entry draft.

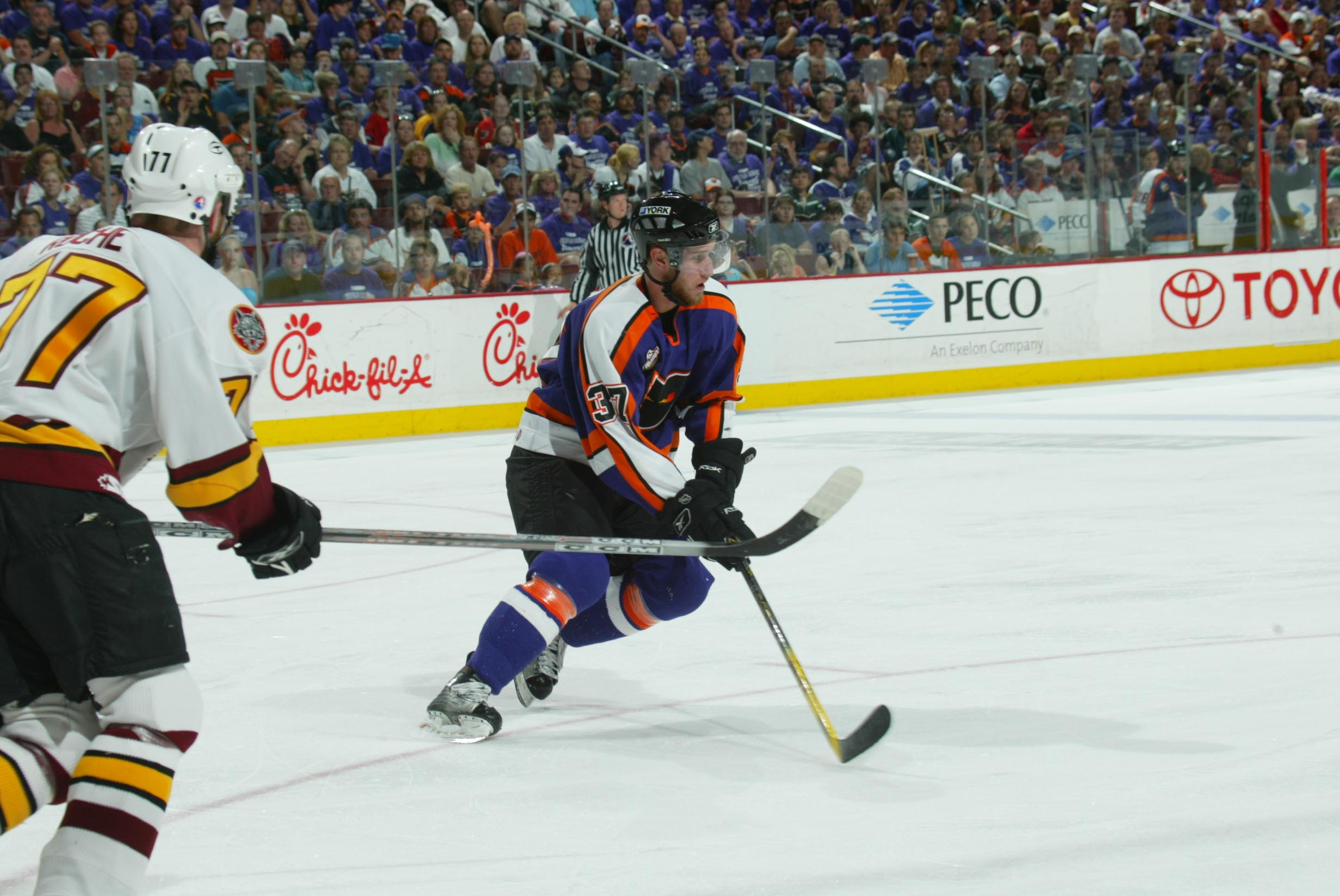
Carter with the Phantoms during the 2005 Calder Cup Finals

Returning to the Greyhounds following his draft, he earned Second Team OHL All-Star honours in 2003–04 with a 66-point campaign. Following his third OHL season, he was assigned by the Flyers to their American Hockey League (AHL) affiliate, the Philadelphia Phantoms, for their 2005 Calder Cup playoff season. He recorded five points over 12 games in his initial stint at the professional level. Back in the OHL for his final junior season in 2004–05, he recorded a major junior career-high 74 points (34 goals and 40 assists) in 55 games. He was a First Team OHL All-Star that season and won the OHL and CHL Sportsman of the Year Awards. After the Greyhounds were eliminated from the 2005 OHL playoffs, Carter joined the Phantoms once more and recorded 23 points (12 goals and 11 assists) in 21 playoff games, helping the team win the Calder Cup.

=== Philadelphia Flyers (2005–2011) ===
The next season, in 2005–06, Carter made the Flyers' roster out of training camp. He was joined by fellow rookies Mike Richards and R. J. Umberger, who were both also instrumental in the Phantoms' Calder Cup championship of the previous season. He scored his first career NHL goal on October 27, 2005, against Roberto Luongo of the Florida Panthers. He finished the campaign first in team-scoring among rookies with 23 goals and 42 points.

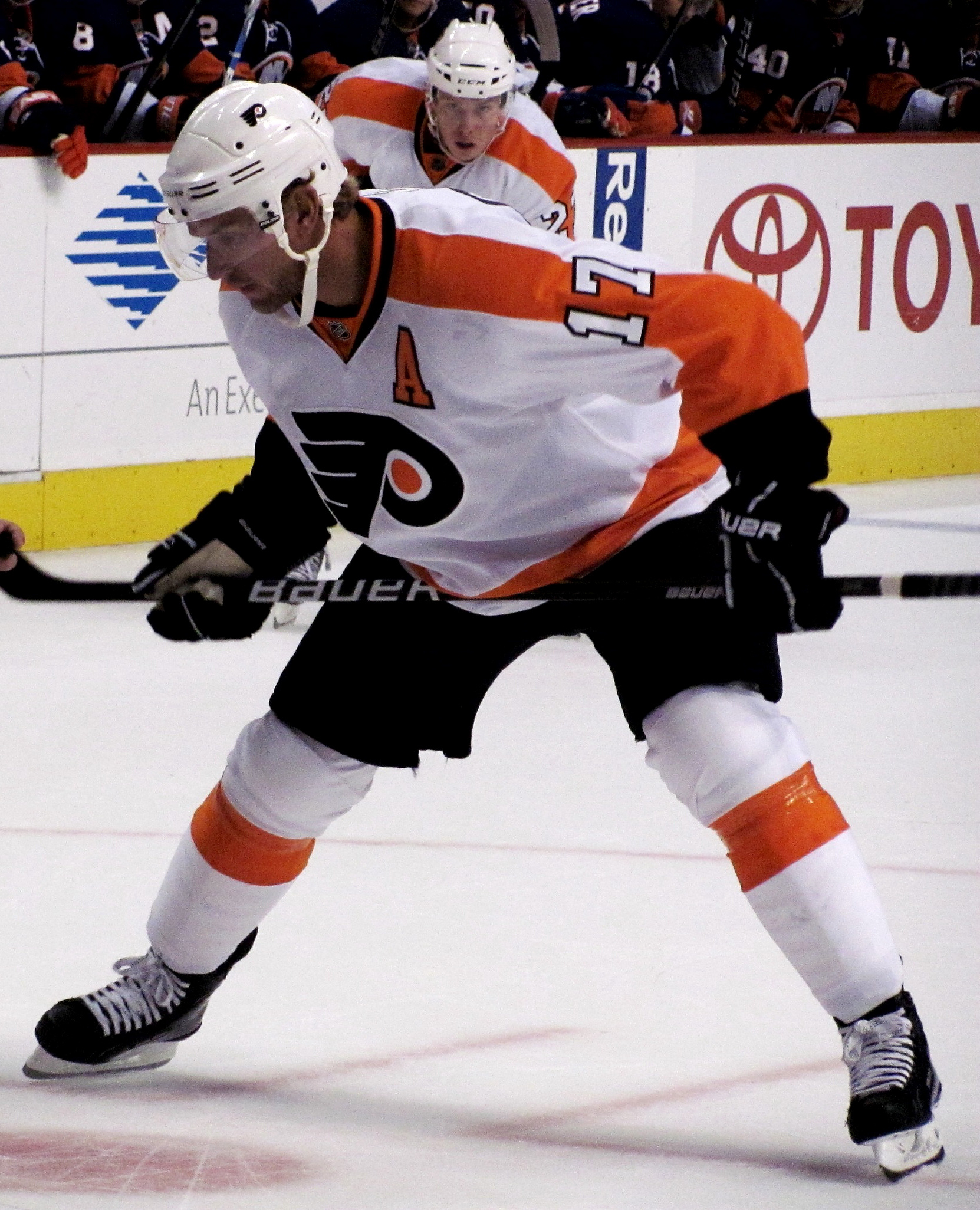
Carter with the Flyers in September 2010

After 37- and 53-point efforts in his second and third NHL seasons, respectively, Carter and the Flyers agreed to a three-year, $15-million contract extension on June 27, 2008, days before he was set to become a restricted free agent. He responded with a breakout campaign in 2008–09, leading the team in scoring with 46 goals and 84 points. During the season, he was also named to his first NHL All-Star Game, representing the Eastern Conference. Despite a strong regular season, Carter was held to just one goal in six Stanley Cup playoff games as the Flyers were eliminated by the Pittsburgh Penguins in six games. His series was also marred when he failed to score with an open net in front of him in Game 2 of the series, where Penguins goalie Marc-André Fleury made a toe save to block the shot that would have given the Flyers a 3–1 lead late in the third period. Carter was later called off for a hooking penalty and the Penguins scored to tie the game and eventually win in overtime. It was later revealed that Carter had played the final four games of the series with a separated shoulder.

On November 13, 2010, Carter signed an 11-year, $58 million contract extension with the Flyers through to the 2021–22 season, the longest contract of his career.

=== Columbus Blue Jackets (2011–2012) ===
While in the midst of a major re-tooling, the Flyers traded Carter to the Columbus Blue Jackets on June 23, 2011, in exchange for Jakub Voráček, a 2011 first-round pick (Sean Couturier) and a 2011 third-round pick (Nick Cousins).

Despite being injured in the start of the season, Carter was named an alternate captain with the Blue Jackets, one of four rotating alternates along with James Wisniewski, former Flyers teammate R. J. Umberger and Antoine Vermette.

=== Los Angeles Kings (2012–2021) ===
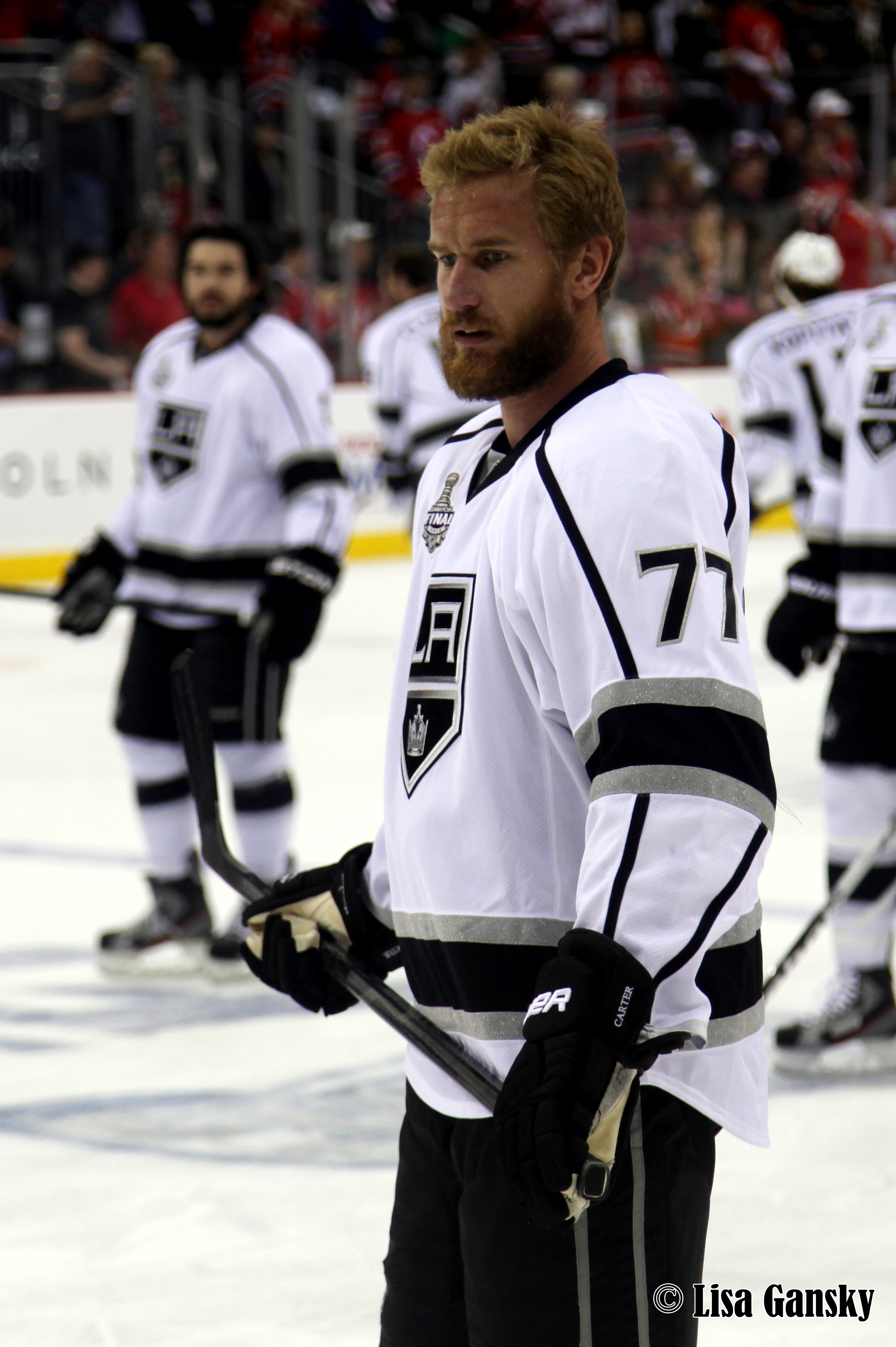
Carter with the Kings in the 2012 Stanley Cup Final.

On February 23, 2012, Carter was traded to the Los Angeles Kings in exchange for Jack Johnson and a conditional first-round pick, reuniting him with former Flyer and close friend Mike Richards.

On June 11, 2012, Carter scored the second of three unanswered goals on a five-minute power play in Game 6 of the 2012 Stanley Cup Final against the New Jersey Devils. His goal proved to be the Cup-winning goal. He would finish the 2012 playoffs with eight goals and five assists.

During the lockout-shortened 2012–13 season, Carter scored 26 goals along with seven assists, playing in all 48 regular season games.

In the first round of the 2014 playoffs, the Kings rallied back from a 3–0 series deficit against the San Jose Sharks to win four-straight and take the series in seven games. This made Carter one of the first and only two players (the other being his teammate Mike Richards) in history to be a part of two teams who achieved such a feat (Philadelphia Flyers in 2010, Los Angeles Kings in 2014; though Carter missed the Flyers' series in 2010 due to injury). When the Kings beat the New York Rangers in 5 games in the 2014 Stanley Cup Final, Carter and Drew Doughty became the seventh and eighth NHL players to win both an Olympic ice hockey gold medal and the Stanley Cup in the same year.

Early in the 2014–15 season, Carter was named the NHL's First Star of the Week for October 20–26 after scoring two goals and four assists in just two games. This helped the reigning Stanley Cup champion Kings maintain a perfect 6–0 record during their season-opening homestand. On February 15, 2015, Carter passed the 500 career NHL point mark with a three-assist performance against the Calgary Flames in a 5–3 victory for the Kings. Carter played a majority of the season with Tanner Pearson and Tyler Toffoli, with the line being dubbed "That '70s Line" since all three had jersey numbers in the 70s.

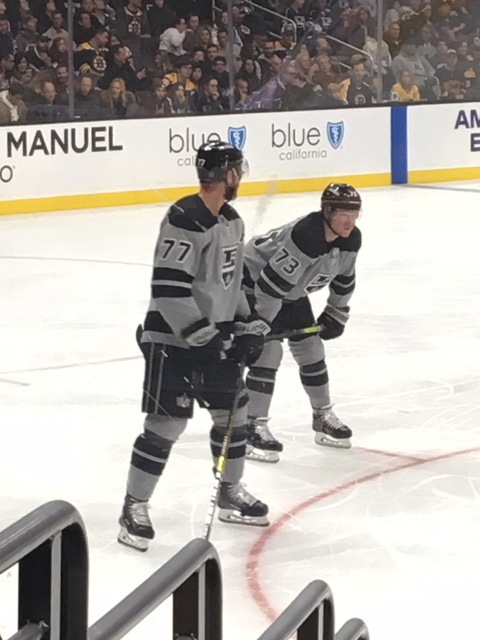
Carter (foreground) with Tyler Toffoli during a Kings game in February 2019.

In the 2016–17 season, Carter was named to his second All-Star game appearance, along with teammate Drew Doughty. Appearing in all 82 games for the Kings, he ended the season as the team's leading scorer with 32 goals and 66 points.

With high expectations to replicate these stats in 2017–18, Carter would unfortunately suffer an injury on October 18, 2017. He had a lacerated left ankle from a skate cut from Montreal Canadiens forward Jeff Petry. Carter missed 55 games as a result and his scoring production would gradually decline following this season.

Carter would play his 1,000th NHL game on November 16, 2019, scoring the game winning goal in a 4-3 victory against the Vegas Golden Knights in the process.

In his tenth season with the Kings, Carter began the pandemic delayed 2020–21 season by adding 4 points in the Kings opening two games against the Minnesota Wild. He added 8 goals and 19 points through 40 regular season games with the rebuilding Kings.

=== Pittsburgh Penguins (2021–2024) ===
On the eve of the 2021 trade deadline, Carter was traded with his salary retained by 50% by the Kings to the Pittsburgh Penguins in exchange for a conditional 2022 third-round draft pick and a 2023 fourth-round draft pick on April 11, 2021. On May 6, 2021, he registered his first career four-goal game in an 8–4 victory against the Buffalo Sabres. Since joining the Penguins, Carter credited the trade for rejuvenating his goalscoring and prolonging his career.

After a few seasons of his point production dropping since 2017–18, Carter would play a larger role as a center for the Penguins in the 2021–22 season, posting decent numbers of 19 goals, 26 assists, and 45 points in 76 games. Even with the return of Evgeni Malkin, he continued to score very well in the left wing position. He signed a two-year contract extension with the Penguins on January 26, 2022.

Carter announced his retirement from hockey on April 17, 2024, immediately following the Penguins' final game of the 2023–24 season.

== International play ==
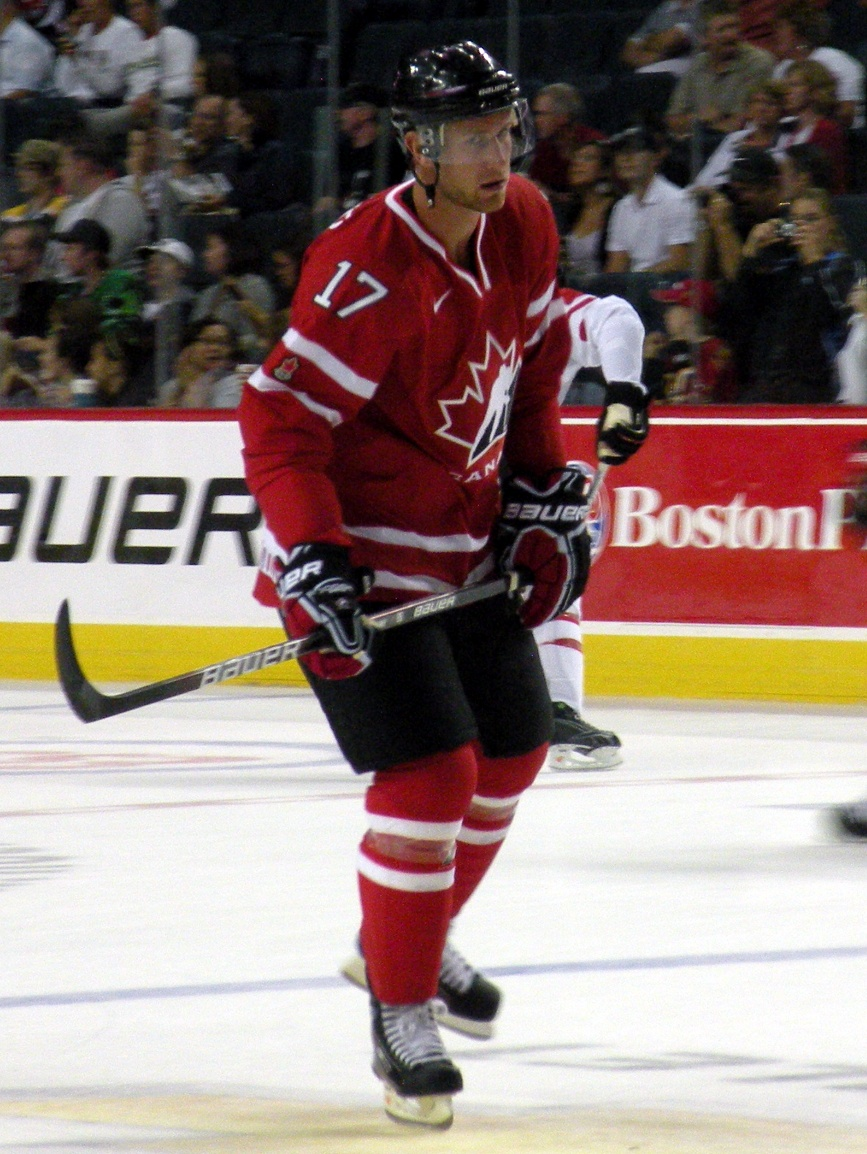
- Carter pictured with Team Canada

Medal record

Representing Canada

Men's ice hockey

Winter Olympics
Gold medal – first place	2014 Sochi	

World Junior Championships
Gold medal – first place	2005 United States	
Silver medal – second place	2004 Finland	

IIHF World U18 Championships
Gold medal – first place	2003 Russia	

Carter debuted internationally with Team Canada with the under-18 team at the 2003 IIHF World U18 Championships. He scored six points in seven games, helping Canada to their first-ever gold medal at the tournament.

The following year, Carter moved on to the Canadian national under-20 team, playing in back-to-back World Junior Championships. Winning silver in 2004 and gold in 2005, he was named to the tournament's All-Star Team in both instances. His combined 12 goals over both years tied him with Eric Lindros (later also tied by John Tavares) for Canada's all-time record at the World Juniors. Lindros had played in three tournaments between 1990 and 1992 (one more than both Carter and Tavares). Carter had been joined on the World Junior squads by two future Philadelphia Flyers teammates, Mike Richards and Braydon Coburn.

Following his rookie NHL season, Carter played for the Canadian men's team at the 2006 World Championships. He recorded six points in nine games as Canada failed to qualify for a medal. He was also selected as a reserve by Team Canada for the 2010 Winter Olympics should an injury occur.

Carter then played for Canada at the 2014 Winter Olympics, where he scored a natural hat-trick against Austria, and eventually took home gold after helping defeat Sweden in the final.

== Personal life ==
Carter was born in London, Ontario to parents Jim and Sue Carter.

On July 7, 2014, he married his wife, Megan Keffer. They have a daughter and son and currently reside in the Pittsburgh area.

He was good friends with Mike Richards, his teammate from his tenure with the Flyers and the Kings.

== Career statistics ==
=== Regular season and playoffs ===
Bold indicates led league

			Regular season					Playoffs
Season	Team	League	GP	G	A	Pts	PIM	GP	G	A	Pts	PIM
2000–01	Strathroy Rockets	WOHL	49	27	20	47	10	—	—	—	—	—
2001–02	Sault Ste. Marie Greyhounds	OHL	63	18	17	35	12	4	0	0	0	2
2002–03	Sault Ste. Marie Greyhounds	OHL	61	35	36	71	55	4	0	2	2	2
2003–04	Sault Ste. Marie Greyhounds	OHL	57	36	30	66	26	—	—	—	—	—
2003–04	Philadelphia Phantoms	AHL	—	—	—	—	—	12	4	1	5	0
2004–05	Sault Ste. Marie Greyhounds	OHL	55	34	40	74	40	7	5	5	10	6
2004–05	Philadelphia Phantoms	AHL	3	0	1	1	4	21	12	11	23	12
2005–06	Philadelphia Flyers	NHL	81	23	19	42	40	6	0	0	0	10
2006–07	Philadelphia Flyers	NHL	62	14	23	37	48	—	—	—	—	—
2007–08	Philadelphia Flyers	NHL	82	29	24	53	55	17	6	5	11	12
2008–09	Philadelphia Flyers	NHL	82	46	38	84	68	6	1	0	1	8
2009–10	Philadelphia Flyers	NHL	74	33	28	61	38	12	5	2	7	2
2010–11	Philadelphia Flyers	NHL	80	36	30	66	39	6	1	1	2	2
2011–12	Columbus Blue Jackets	NHL	39	15	10	25	14	—	—	—	—	—
2011–12	Los Angeles Kings	NHL	16	6	3	9	2	20	**8**	5	13	4
2012–13	Los Angeles Kings	NHL	48	26	7	33	16	18	6	7	13	14
2013–14	Los Angeles Kings	NHL	72	27	23	50	44	26	10	15	25	4
2014–15	Los Angeles Kings	NHL	82	28	34	62	28	—	—	—	—	—
2015–16	Los Angeles Kings	NHL	77	24	38	62	20	5	2	0	2	4
2016–17	Los Angeles Kings	NHL	82	32	34	66	41	—	—	—	—	—
2017–18	Los Angeles Kings	NHL	27	13	9	22	2	4	0	0	0	2
2018–19	Los Angeles Kings	NHL	76	13	20	33	42	—	—	—	—	—
2019–20	Los Angeles Kings	NHL	60	17	10	27	36	—	—	—	—	—
2020–21	Los Angeles Kings	NHL	40	8	11	19	22	—	—	—	—	—
2020–21	Pittsburgh Penguins	NHL	14	9	2	11	0	6	4	1	5	4
2021–22	Pittsburgh Penguins	NHL	76	19	26	45	38	7	4	1	5	6
2022–23	Pittsburgh Penguins	NHL	79	13	16	29	30	—	—	—	—	—
2023–24	Pittsburgh Penguins	NHL	72	11	4	15	12	—	—	—	—	—
NHL totals			1,321	442	409	851	635	133	47	37	84	72

=== International ===
Year	Team	Event	Result	GP	G	A	Pts	PIM
2002	Canada Ontario	U17	3rd place, bronze medalist(s)	6	5	3	8	4
2003	Canada	U18	1st place, gold medalist(s)	7	2	4	6	2
2004	Canada	WJC	2nd place, silver medalist(s)	6	5	2	7	2
2005	Canada	WJC	1st place, gold medalist(s)	6	7	3	10	6
2006	Canada	WC	4th	9	4	2	6	2
2014	Canada	OG	1st place, gold medalist(s)	6	3	2	5	2
Junior totals				25	19	12	31	14
Senior totals				15	7	4	11	4

== Awards ==
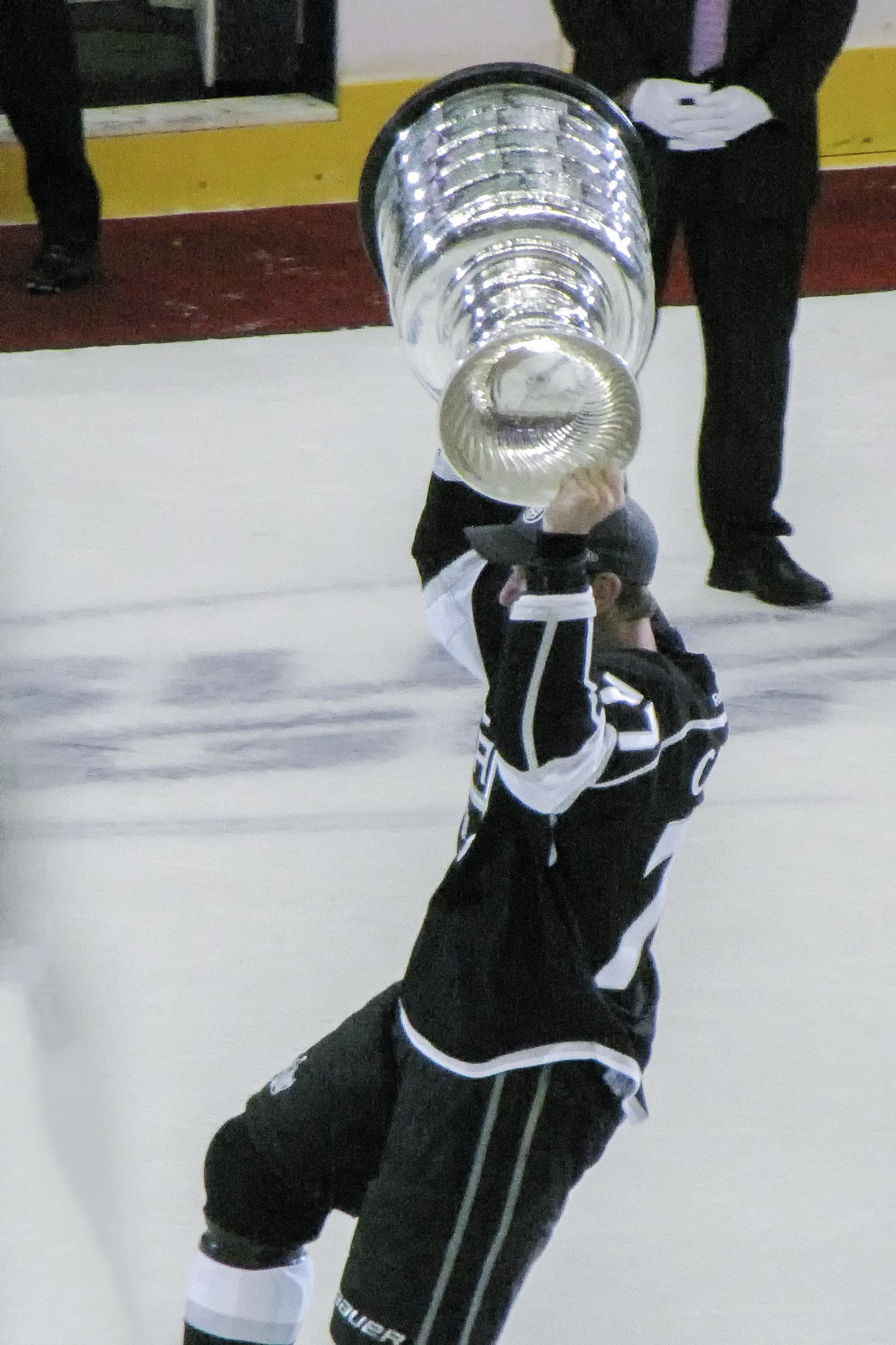
Carter hoists the Stanley Cup after the Kings won the 2012 Stanley Cup Final

=== Major junior ===
- Named to the OHL Second All-Star Team in 2004.
- Named to the OHL First All-Star Team in 2005.
- Won the William Hanley Trophy (OHL Sportsman of the Year) in 2005.
- Won the CHL Sportsman of the Year in 2005.

=== Professional ===
- Won the Calder Cup with the Philadelphia Phantoms in 2005.
- Played in the NHL All-Star Game in 2009 and 2017.
- Won the Stanley Cup with the Los Angeles Kings in 2012 and 2014.

=== International ===
- Named to the World Junior All-Star Team in 2004 and 2005.
- Won a World Junior gold medal with Team Canada in 2005.
- Won an Olympic gold medal at the 2014 Sochi Olympics with Team Canada.

Achievements
Preceded by Joni Pitkänen	Philadelphia Flyers first-round draft pick 2003	Succeeded by Mike Richards
