= Tanner Pearson =

Canadian ice hockey player (born 1992)

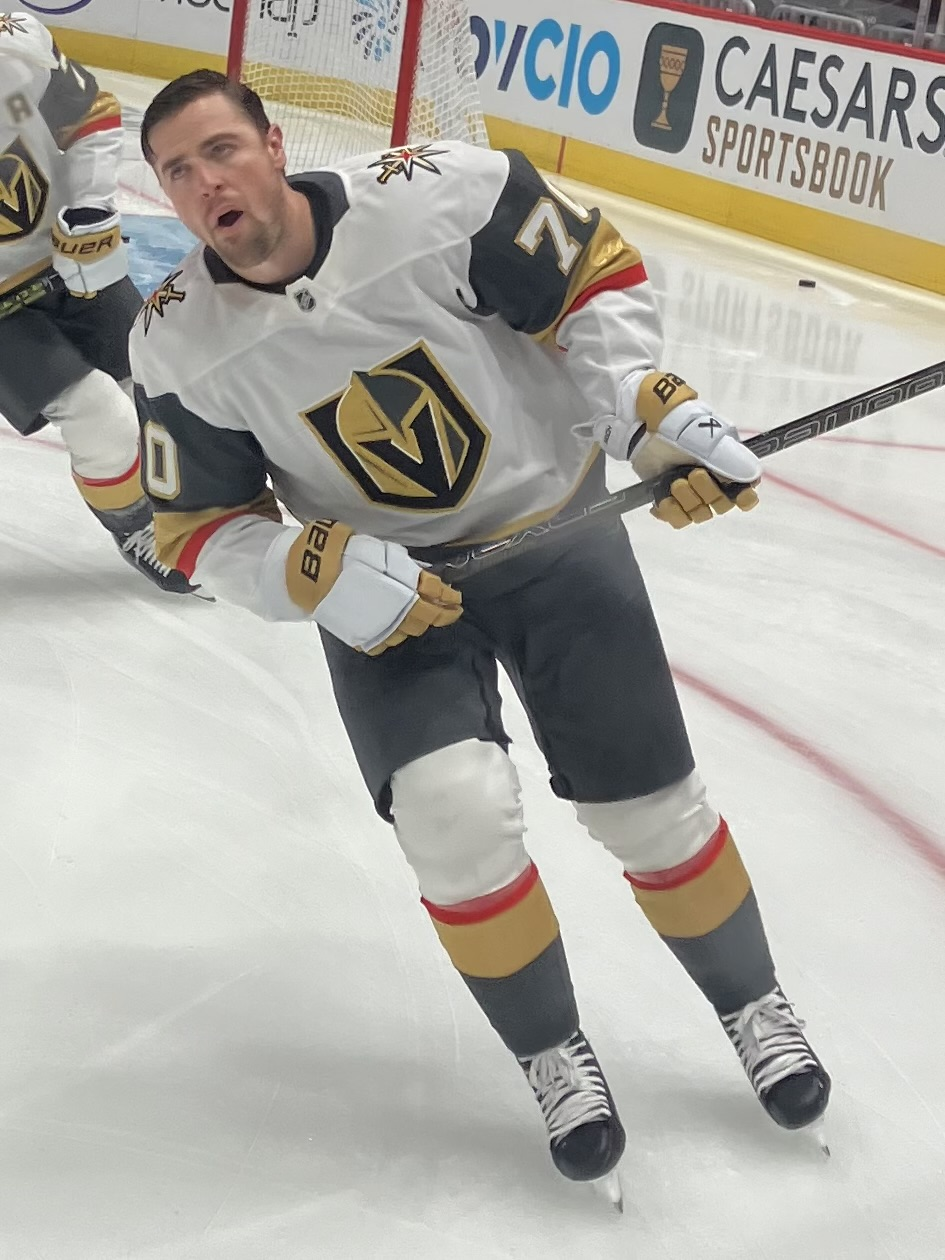
- Pearson with the Vegas Golden Knights in 2024
- Born: August 10, 1992 (age 33) Kitchener, Ontario, Canada
- Height: 6 ft 1 in (185 cm)
- Weight: 207 lb (94 kg; 14 st 11 lb)
- Position: Winger
- Shoots: Left
- NHL team Former teams: Free agent Los Angeles Kings; Pittsburgh Penguins; Vancouver Canucks; Montreal Canadiens; Vegas Golden Knights; Winnipeg Jets; Buffalo Sabres
- NHL draft: 30th overall, 2012; Los Angeles Kings
- Playing career: 2012–present

Tanner Pearson (born August 10, 1992) is a Canadian professional ice hockey player who is a winger who is currently an unrestricted free agent. He most recently played for the Buffalo Sabres of the National Hockey League (NHL). He was selected in the first round, 30th overall, by the Los Angeles Kings in the 2012 NHL entry draft and won the Stanley Cup with the Kings in 2014. Pearson has also previously played for the Pittsburgh Penguins, Vancouver Canucks, Montreal Canadiens, Vegas Golden Knights, and Winnipeg Jets.

== Playing career ==
=== Junior ===
Pearson began his junior career playing for the Waterloo Siskins, playing Junior B hockey in the Greater Ontario Junior Hockey League when he was 16 and 17 years of age. He was selected by Barrie Colts in the Ontario Hockey League (OHL) in the 14th round of the OHL priority draft, 237th overall. In his rookie season with the Colts, Pearson played on the second and third lines, scoring 15 goals and 42 points in 66 games. On November 19, 2011, Pearson scored a hat trick, including the game winner in overtime, in a 6–5 win over the Ottawa 67's. On March 18, 2012, it was announced that Pearson would miss the remainder of the season and any Colts' playoff games due to a broken fibula. Pearson finished the 2011–12 season third in OHL scoring with 37 goals and 91 points in 60 games. He was named to the OHL's second All-Star Team.

=== Professional ===
==== Los Angeles Kings (2013–2018) ====
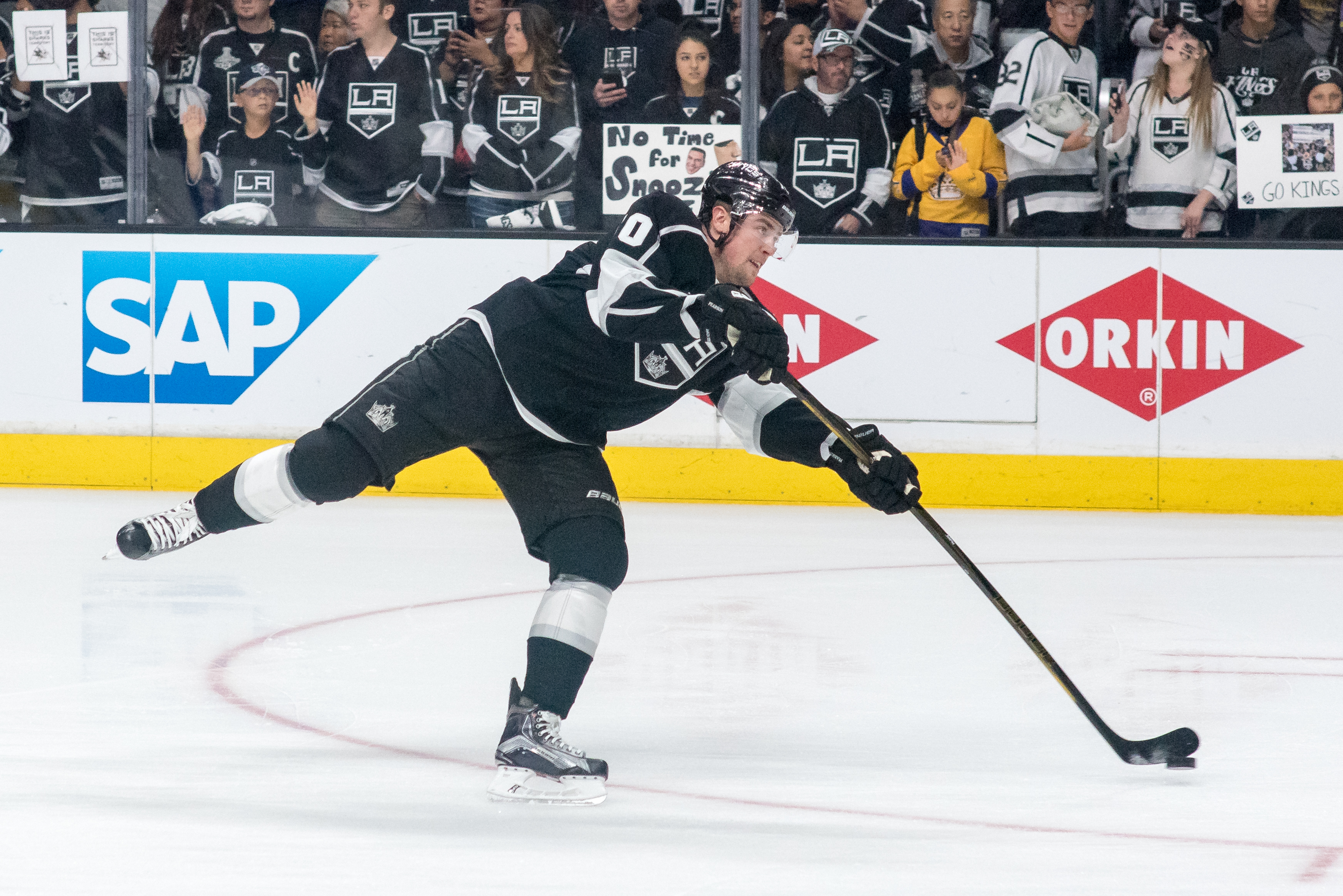
Pearson with the Los Angeles Kings in April 2016.

Pearson was selected by the Los Angeles Kings of the National Hockey League (NHL) with the last pick of the first round (30th overall) in the 2012 NHL entry draft. It was the third time Pearson had been available to be drafted, going undrafted the first two times. On August 3, 2012, Pearson signed a three-year entry-level contract with the Kings.

In 2013, the Kings recalled Pearson after completion of his first professional season with their American Hockey League (AHL) affiliate, the Manchester Monarchs, to be one of their "black aces" on their taxi squad during the Stanley Cup playoffs. On May 18, 2013, he played right wing on the Kings fourth line in his first NHL game in a playoff game against the San Jose Sharks. Pearson scored his first NHL goal on November 14 against Kevin Poulin in a 3–2 win over the New York Islanders. On December 3, Pearson was sent back down to Manchester. On June 13, 2014 Pearson helped lead the Kings to a Stanley Cup victory over the New York Rangers. He scored 12 points in the 24 games it took the Kings to claim the cup.

In the 2014–15 season, Pearson played a majority of the season with Jeff Carter and Tyler Toffoli, with the line being dubbed "That 70s Line" since all three had numbers in the 70s. He was named the NHL's rookie of the month in October 2014. Pearson was injured on January 10, 2015, suffering a broken left fibula during a game against the Winnipeg Jets. The injury caused Pearson to miss the remainder of the season. He finished the season with 23 points in 63 games. On April 2, 2015, Pearson signed a two-year contract extension worth $2.8 million.

In October 2016, during the Kings training camp, Pearson was suspended for four games for an illegal hit to the head of Brandon Davidson of the Edmonton Oilers. He missed the final two Kings' preseason games and the first two of the regular season. After returning from suspension, Pearson scored four goals and six points in his four games. As an impending restricted free agent following the 2016–17 season, having established career bests with 24 goals and 44 points, Pearson agreed to a four-year contract extension worth $15 million on May 8, 2017. Pearson through the first year of his new contract in 2017–18 season, was one of four Kings skaters to appear in all 82 games, with 15 goals and 40 points. With the Kings off to slow start to start the 2018–19 season, Pearson mirrored the Kings struggles by registering just 1 assist through 17 games.

==== Pittsburgh Penguins (2018–2019) ====
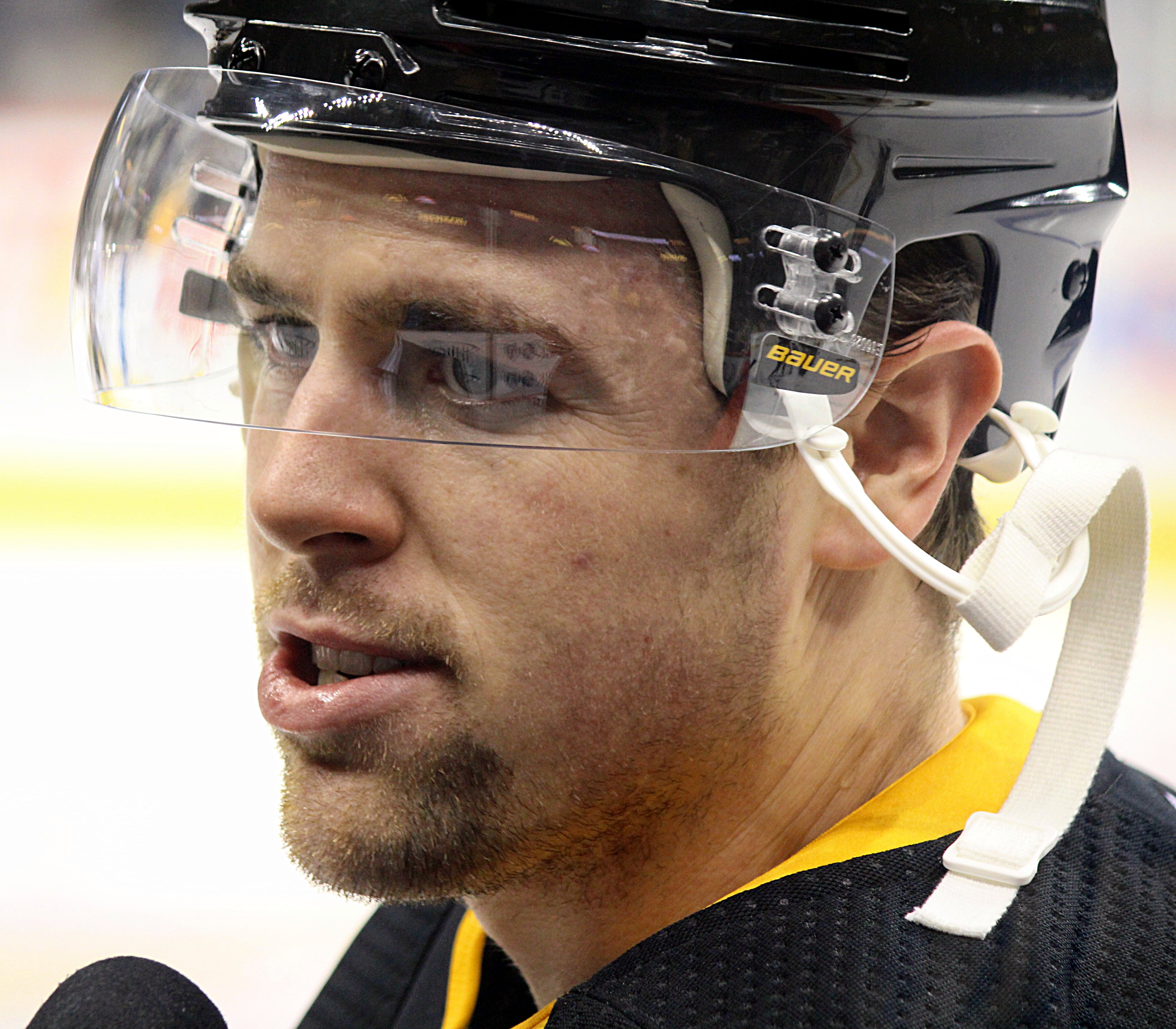
Pearson with the Pittsburgh Penguins in 2018.

On November 14, 2018, Pearson ended his seven-year tenure with the Kings as he was traded to the Pittsburgh Penguins in exchange for winger Carl Hagelin. Pearson made his Penguins debut on November 15 in a 4–3 loss to the Tampa Bay Lightning, skating on a line with Evgeni Malkin and Patric Hornqvist. He scored his first goal in a Pittsburgh uniform against Carter Hutton, along with his first assist, in a 5–4 loss to the Buffalo Sabres. He recorded three goals in his first six games with the Penguins. He played 44 games for the Penguins, scoring nine goals and five assists.

==== Vancouver Canucks (2019–2023) ====
On February 25, 2019, the Penguins traded Pearson to the Vancouver Canucks in exchange for defenceman Erik Gudbranson. He made his Canucks debut in a 3–2 shootout loss to the Colorado Avalanche on February 27. He scored his first goal for Vancouver against Darcy Kuemper in the next game on February 28, a 5–2 loss to the Arizona Coyotes.

During the pandemic-shortened 2019–20 season Pearson registered a career-best 45 points in 69 games. He scored two goals and added two assists for his first four-point night in a 5–2 win over the Edmonton Oilers on December 1. On April 8, 2021, Pearson signed a three-year, $9.75 million extension with the Canucks. Pearson finished the 2021–22 season with 14 goals and 38 points in 68 games.

On November 9, 2022, Pearson suffered a hand injury and underwent surgery. On January 12, 2023, the Canucks organization announced via Twitter that the winger had undergone his third hand surgery since November, and would miss the remainder of the 2022–23 season. When asked about the injury on January 12, Pearson's teammate Quinn Hughes stated that it was "not handled properly" but later clarified that he did not intend to blame anyone for Pearson's setbacks saying "I'm emotional just like everyone else. I wasn't trying to direct blame at anyone. I don't think it's really anyone's fault, it's just an unfortunate situation." On January 13, the Canucks began an internal investigation into how the team handled Pearson's injury. It was also reported that the National Hockey League Players' Association looked into the situation. On February 17, Pearson was placed on injured reserve and missed the remainder of the 2022–23 season. He finished the season having played in 14 games, with one goal and five points.

==== Montreal Canadiens (2023–2024) ====
On September 19, Pearson was traded to the Montreal Canadiens along with a 2025 third-round pick in exchange for goaltender Casey DeSmith.

==== Vegas Golden Knights (2024–2025) ====
As a free agent ahead of the 2024–25 season, Pearson signed a professional tryout (PTO) agreement with the Vegas Golden Knights on August 20, 2024. Following a preseason campaign in which he scored three points in four games, he was signed to a one-year contract by Vegas on October 4.

==== Winnipeg Jets (2025–2026) ====
Following his lone season in Vegas, Pearson signed a one-year contract with the Winnipeg Jets on July 1, 2025.

==== Buffalo Sabres (2026–present) ====
Pearson was traded to the Buffalo Sabres on March 6, 2026 in exchange for a 2026 seventh-round pick.

== International play ==
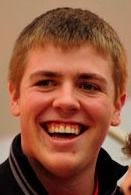

Medal record

Representing Canada

Ice hockey

World Junior Championships
| Bronze medal – third place | 2012 Canada | |

Pearson played for Canada at the 2012 World Junior Ice Hockey Championships, where he was a part of the bronze medal winning team. He was the first member of Team Canada since 2005 to play for the team after being passed over in the NHL draft.

== Personal life ==
Pearson grew up in Kitchener, Ontario, with his sister Ali and parents Kim and Tim Pearson. His father and sister were both involved in hockey; his father worked for equipment company Bauer Hockey and his sister worked for the Kitchener Rangers.

Pearson married his longtime girlfriend Meaghan Loveday in mid-2018.

== Career statistics ==
=== Regular season and playoffs ===
| | | | Regular season | | | | | Playoffs |
| Season | Team | League | GP | G | A | Pts | PIM | GP | G | A | Pts | PIM |
|---|---|---|---|---|---|---|---|---|---|---|---|---|
| 2008–09 | Waterloo Siskins | GOJHL | 52 | 15 | 33 | 48 | 28 | 15 | 5 | 4 | 9 | 16 |
| 2009–10 | Waterloo Siskins | GOJHL | 51 | 29 | 41 | 70 | 78 | 11 | 5 | 11 | 16 | 20 |
| 2010–11 | Barrie Colts | OHL | 66 | 15 | 27 | 42 | 35 | — | — | — | — | — |
| 2011–12 | Barrie Colts | OHL | 60 | 37 | 54 | 91 | 37 | — | — | — | — | — |
| 2012–13 | Manchester Monarchs | AHL | 64 | 19 | 28 | 47 | 14 | 4 | 0 | 1 | 1 | 4 |
| 2012–13 | Los Angeles Kings | NHL | — | — | — | — | — | 1 | 0 | 0 | 0 | 0 |
| 2013–14 | Manchester Monarchs | AHL | 41 | 17 | 15 | 32 | 18 | — | — | — | — | — |
| 2013–14 | Los Angeles Kings | NHL | 25 | 3 | 4 | 7 | 8 | 24 | 4 | 8 | 12 | 8 |
| 2014–15 | Los Angeles Kings | NHL | 42 | 12 | 4 | 16 | 14 | — | — | — | — | — |
| 2015–16 | Los Angeles Kings | NHL | 79 | 15 | 21 | 36 | 18 | 5 | 1 | 2 | 3 | 2 |
| 2016–17 | Los Angeles Kings | NHL | 80 | 24 | 20 | 44 | 13 | — | — | — | — | — |
| 2017–18 | Los Angeles Kings | NHL | 82 | 15 | 25 | 40 | 27 | 4 | 0 | 0 | 0 | 0 |
| 2018–19 | Los Angeles Kings | NHL | 17 | 0 | 1 | 1 | 8 | — | — | — | — | — |
| 2018–19 | Pittsburgh Penguins | NHL | 44 | 9 | 5 | 14 | 13 | — | — | — | — | — |
| 2018–19 | Vancouver Canucks | NHL | 19 | 9 | 3 | 12 | 4 | — | — | — | — | — |
| 2019–20 | Vancouver Canucks | NHL | 69 | 21 | 24 | 45 | 27 | 17 | 4 | 4 | 8 | 4 |
| 2020–21 | Vancouver Canucks | NHL | 51 | 10 | 8 | 18 | 26 | — | — | — | — | — |
| 2021–22 | Vancouver Canucks | NHL | 68 | 14 | 20 | 34 | 30 | — | — | — | — | — |
| 2022–23 | Vancouver Canucks | NHL | 14 | 1 | 4 | 5 | 21 | — | — | — | — | — |
| 2023–24 | Montreal Canadiens | NHL | 54 | 5 | 8 | 13 | 21 | — | — | — | — | — |
| 2024–25 | Vegas Golden Knights | NHL | 78 | 12 | 15 | 27 | 8 | 8 | 0 | 1 | 1 | 0 |
| 2025–26 | Winnipeg Jets | NHL | 52 | 7 | 6 | 13 | 25 | — | — | — | — | — |
| 2025–26 | Buffalo Sabres | NHL | 4 | 0 | 2 | 2 | 2 | — | — | — | — | — |
| NHL totals | | | 778 | 157 | 170 | 327 | 265 | 59 | 9 | 15 | 24 | 14 |

=== International ===
| Year | Team | Event | Result | GP | G | A | Pts | PIM |
|---|---|---|---|---|---|---|---|---|
| 2012 | Canada | WJC | 3rd place, bronze medalist(s) | 6 | 1 | 5 | 6 | 6 |
| Junior totals | | | | 6 | 1 | 5 | 6 | 6 |

== Awards and honours ==
| Award | Year |
OHL
| Subway Super Series - Team OHL | 2011 |
| Second Team All-Star | 2011–12 |
NHL
| Stanley Cup champion | 2014 |

Awards and achievements
| Preceded by Derek Forbort | Los Angeles Kings first-round draft pick 2012 | Succeeded by Adrian Kempe |
