= That 70s Line =

Los Angeles Kings line

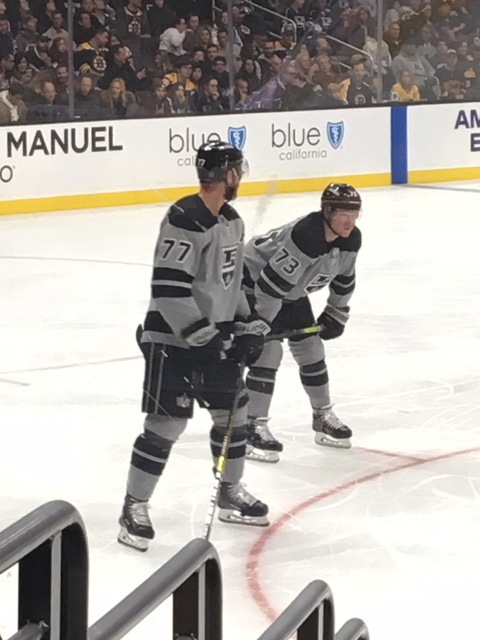
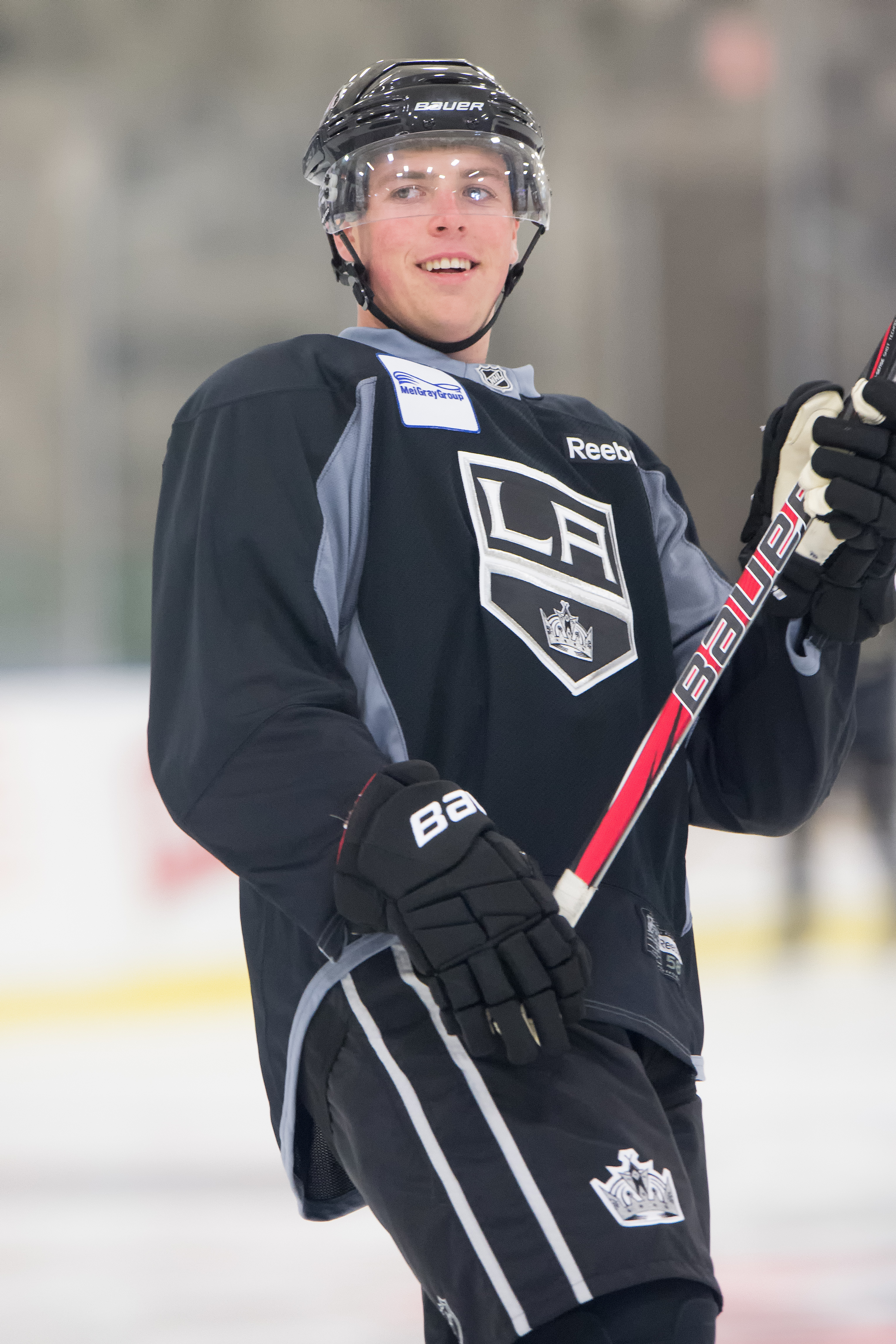
Left to right: Carter, Toffoli, Pearson

That 70s Line is the nickname of the ice hockey forward line consisting of center Jeff Carter and wingers Tanner Pearson and Tyler Toffoli who played for the National Hockey League's Los Angeles Kings. The nickname, a reference to That '70s Show, comes from all three players having jersey numbers in the 70s. Debuting in the 2014 Western Conference final, That 70s Line combined for a total of 23 points during that series, allowing the Kings to defeat the Chicago Blackhawks and advance to the 2014 Stanley Cup Final, which the Kings won. The line received credit as a critical factor in helping the Kings win their second Stanley Cup, and were noted for their chemistry and the offensive spark that they provided to the Kings' lineup.

That 70s Line led the Kings in scoring throughout the beginning of the 2014–15 NHL season; however, after Pearson broke his leg in January 2015, winger Dwight King, who wore number 74, took Pearson's place alongside Carter and Toffoli. The original lineup of Carter, Toffoli, and Pearson reunited in December 2015; they played together often until the Kings traded Pearson in 2018.

== Background ==
The Los Angeles Kings drafted right winger Tyler Toffoli in the 2010 NHL entry draft at 47th overall. Toffoli made his debut with the Kings on March 16, 2013, against the San Jose Sharks.

The Kings received center Jeff Carter in a trade with the Columbus Blue Jackets in February 2012, sending defenseman Jack Johnson and a conditional first round pick in return. The Blue Jackets selected Marko Daňo with the pick in the 2013 NHL entry draft. In his initial season with the team, Carter helped the Kings win their first Stanley Cup. In that year's draft, the Kings selected left winger Tanner Pearson with the 30th overall pick; he debuted near the midpoint of the 2013–14 NHL season.

== That 70s Line ==
=== 2014 Stanley Cup playoffs ===
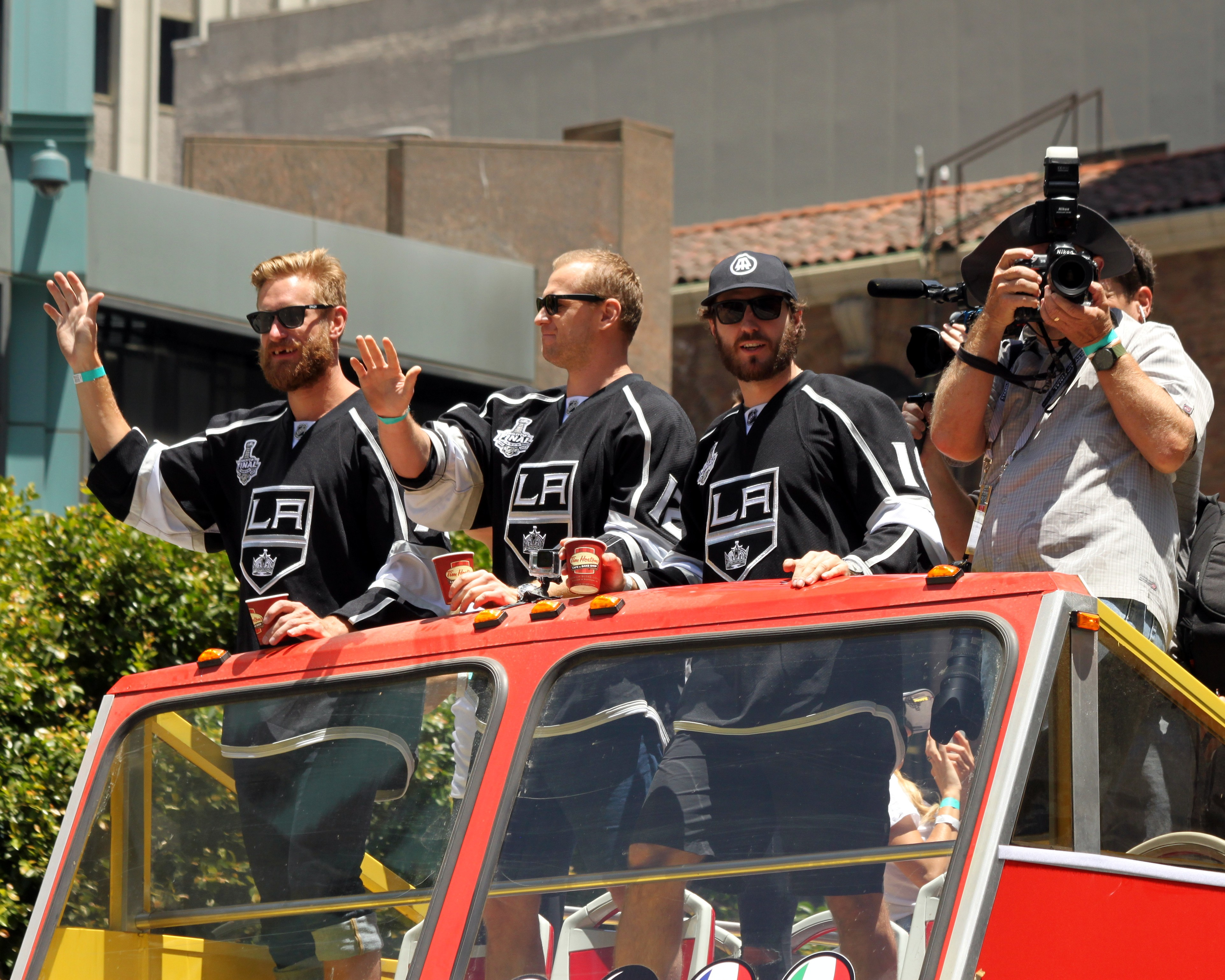
Carter (far left) during the Kings' 2014 victory parade

The line of Pearson, Carter, and Toffoli first began playing in the 2014 Western Conference final against the Chicago Blackhawks. During that series, the three combined for a total of 23 points, allowing the Kings to defeat the Blackhawks in seven games and advance to the 2014 Stanley Cup Final. Carter in particular led all players that series in points with 11 and goals with 5. The line was not as productive during the Stanley Cup Final, totaling four points in five games, but they still played a role in helping the Kings win their second Stanley Cup in three years. The nickname, a reference to That '70s Show, comes from all three players having jersey numbers in the 70s: Carter wore number 77, Pearson wore number 70, and Toffoli wore number 73. The line was noted for its chemistry and the offensive spark that it provided to the Kings' lineup, especially as the Kings struggled to score goals against the Blackhawks. It received credit as a critical factor in helping the Kings win their second Stanley Cup, and ESPN listed it as one of the Kings' best lines of the previous 30 years in 2020.

=== 2014–15 season ===
That 70s Line began the 2014–15 NHL season together, totaling 7 points in the Kings' preseason opener against the Arizona Coyotes in a 5–4 loss. Over the Kings' first 11 games that season, the line averaged two goals per game, and Toffoli, Pearson, and Carter all led the Kings in points scored. After a productive beginning to the season, the line's performance declined until January 2015, when Pearson broke his leg in a contest against the Winnipeg Jets. Following Pearson's injury, winger Dwight King, who wore number 74, took his place alongside Carter and Toffoli. Dubbed "That 70s Line 2.0", the line was once again the Kings' most effective offensively. Despite the line's productivity, the Kings failed to reach the playoffs that season.

=== Post–2015 and breakup ===
Due to multiple roster changes, the original line of Carter, Toffoli, and Pearson were reunited in December 2015. The three often played together until the Kings traded Pearson to the Pittsburgh Penguins in exchange for Carl Hagelin in November 2018; the three had been playing on the same line when the trade occurred. The Kings would later trade Toffoli to the Vancouver Canucks in 2020 and Carter to the Penguins in 2021.

When Toffoli joined the San Jose Sharks in 2024 and wore 73, he often played alongside Macklin Celebrini (who wore 71) and William Eklund (72), leading some to use the "70s Line" moniker to refer to the trio.
