= Jamie Drysdale =

Canadian ice hockey player (born 2002)

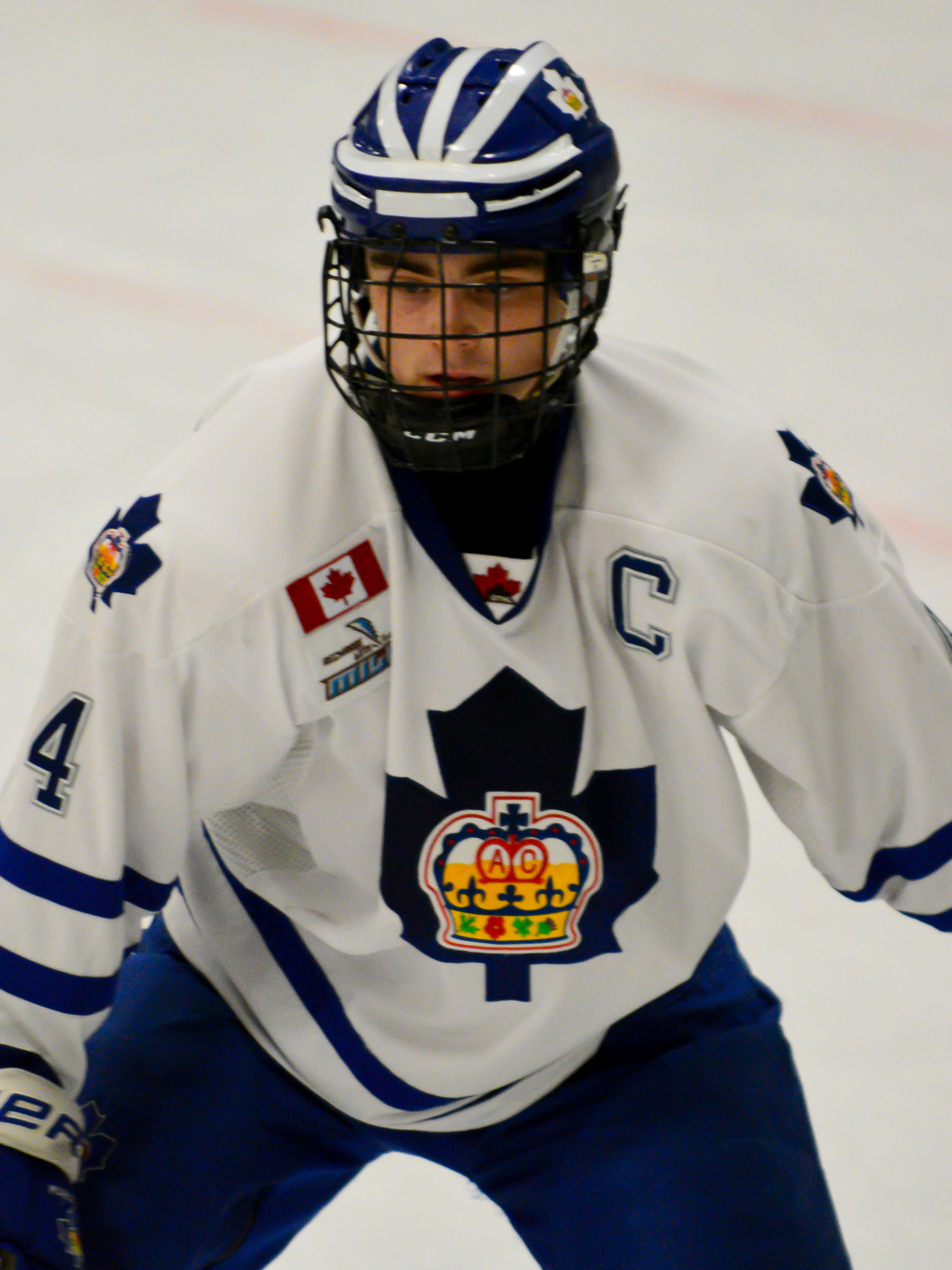
- Drysdale with the Toronto Marlboros in 2018
- Born: April 8, 2002 (age 24) Toronto, Ontario, Canada
- Height: 5 ft 11 in (180 cm)
- Weight: 185 lb (84 kg; 13 st 3 lb)
- Position: Defence
- Shoots: Right
- NHL team Former teams: Philadelphia Flyers; Anaheim Ducks
- NHL draft: 6th overall, 2020; Anaheim Ducks
- Playing career: 2021–present

Jamie Drysdale (born April 8, 2002) is a Canadian professional ice hockey player who is a defenceman for the Philadelphia Flyers of the National Hockey League (NHL). He previously played for the Anaheim Ducks of the NHL. Internationally, Drysdale has represented Canada at multiple underage and junior competitions.

Raised in Toronto, Drysdale played minor ice hockey in the Greater Toronto Hockey League and with St. Michael's College School. The Erie Otters of the Ontario Hockey League (OHL) drafted him fourth overall in the 2018 OHL Priority Selection. In his two seasons of junior ice hockey, Drysdale was both an OHL First Team All-Rookie and All-Star.

Considered a top prospect, Drysdale was selected sixth overall by the Ducks in the 2020 NHL entry draft. After recording 32 points in 81 games during the 2021–22 season, he missed significant time to injury the next two seasons, including a torn glenoid labrum that caused Drysdale to miss nearly the entire 2022–23 season. In 2024, he was traded to the Flyers in exchange for Cutter Gauthier.

== Early life ==
Drysdale was born April 8, 2002, to Tina and Gary Drysdale in Toronto, Ontario. He began playing ice hockey at a young age with the Learn to Play program in Toronto, and also regularly practiced figure skating at the Toronto Cricket, Skating and Curling Club. As a young skater, Drysdale wore No. 4 as a tribute to Bobby Orr, one of his father's favorite players. During his childhood and adolescence, Drysdale came up through the Greater Toronto Hockey League (GTHL), playing minor ice hockey with the North York Knights and the Toronto Marlboros. As a student at St. Michael's College School, he also spent time with the St. Michael's Buzzers of the Ontario Junior Hockey League (OJHL). During the 2017–18 GTHL season, Drysdale recorded eight goals and 50 points in 57 games for the Marlboros. In addition to being named the GTHL Player of the Year, Drysdale led all defencemen with nine points in six OHL Cup games and was named to the tournament All-Star Team.

== Playing career ==
=== Junior ===
The Erie Otters of the Ontario Hockey League (OHL) drafted Drysdale fourth overall in the 2018 OHL Priority Selection, and he signed with the team that May. Drysdale joined the Otters for the 2018–19 OHL season, making his junior ice hockey debut with two assists in Erie's season-opening 12–1 win over the Flint Firebirds. His first OHL goal followed on October 17, in the Otters' 4–3 victory over the Niagara IceDogs. Drysdale's overtime goal against the London Knights on February 15, 2019, was his 29th point of the season, breaking Travis Dermott's franchise record for a rookie defenceman. He finished his rookie season with 40 points in 63 games, earning a place on the 2018–19 OHL First All-Rookie Team.

Drysdale entered the 2019–20 OHL season as one of four rotating alternate captains behind Jack Duff. The youngest defenceman on the Otters that season, Drysdale told reporters that "the whole atmosphere and expectations [were] a lot higher" in his second year. On September 22, Drysdale recorded one goal and four assists in Erie's 8–5 win over the Hamilton Bulldogs, tying a franchise record for most points by a defenceman in a single game. During the season, Drysdale made appearances at two prospect competitions: the CHL Canada/Russia Series and the CHL/NHL Top Prospects Game. By the time that the 2019–20 OHL season was cancelled in response to the COVID-19 pandemic, Drysdale totalled nine goals and 47 points over 49 games, and he was named to the OHL First All-Star Team at defence. Drysdale was considered a top National Hockey League (NHL) prospect, with the NHL Central Scouting Bureau ranking him third among all North American skaters during the 2019–20 season.

=== Professional ===
==== Anaheim Ducks (2021–2024) ====
With his access to ice skating limited by the pandemic, Drysdale spent the 2020 offseason exercising and practicing inline skating. The Anaheim Ducks selected Drysdale sixth overall in the 2020 NHL entry draft, and he signed a three-year entry-level contract with the team on November 7. When the 2020–21 NHL season began in January, the Ducks assigned Drysdale to the San Diego Gulls, their American Hockey League (AHL) affiliate. After recording ten points in his first 14 AHL games and being named the league's Rookie of the Month for February, Drysdale was promoted to Anaheim's taxi squad in March. Drysdale made his NHL debut on March 18, 2021, scoring a goal and registering an assist in Anaheim's 3–2 overtime win against the Arizona Coyotes. Drysdale and Trevor Zegras's goals came only 2 minutes and 29 seconds apart in the second period, making them the youngest set of NHL teammates to record their first goals within 2:30 of one another. Appearing in 24 games that season, Drysdale finished with three goals and eight points. When the Ducks' season ended, Drysdale returned to the Gulls for a truncated AHL playoff series in which he put up two assists in three games.

Drysdale was named to the Ducks' 2021–22 opening-night roster, playing on Anaheim's top defensive pairing with Hampus Lindholm. As the season progressed, Drysdale struggled to balance his offensive output with maintaining his defence, telling reporters that it was "just a matter of noticing when and where you are in the game and making the smart play". After a difficult defensive stretch in which he was on the ice for seven even strength goals against Anaheim in two games, Drysdale was a healthy scratch for the team's March 12 game against the New Jersey Devils. Coach Dallas Eakins observed that after the scratch, Drysdale appeared "less busy", which helped his defence. He finished his first full NHL season with four goals and 32 points in 81 games, second only to Moritz Seider in scoring by a rookie defenceman.

The Ducks underwent major line-up changes prior to the 2022–23 season, and Drysdale opened the year on the second defensive pair alongside Dmitry Kulikov. On October 22, in the second period of a 4–0 loss to the Vegas Golden Knights, Drysdale took a hit from William Carrier behind Anaheim's net and left the game. He was ultimately revealed to have suffered a torn glenoid labrum on the play and underwent surgery, which sidelined Drysdale for the remainder of the season. He was pointless in the eight games he played before the injury.

A restricted free agent prior to the 2023–24 season, Drysdale's contract negotiations extended throughout the offseason, forcing him to miss part of training camp. On October 5, 2023, the two sides agreed to a three-year, $6.9 million extension. Two games into the season, Drysdale suffered a lower-body injury against the Carolina Hurricanes. He did not return until December 21, when the Ducks faced the Calgary Flames. On December 27, Drysdale scored a goal in Anaheim's 5–2 win over the Golden Knights, his first since March 21, 2022. In 10 games with the Ducks during the 2023–24 season, Drysdale recorded one goal and five points.

==== Philadelphia Flyers (2024–present) ====
On January 8, 2024, the Ducks traded Drysdale, as well as a second-round selection in the 2025 NHL entry draft, to the Philadelphia Flyers. In exchange, Anaheim received the signing rights to prospect Cutter Gauthier. Flyers coach John Tortorella praised Drysdale's skating ability and told reporters that he hoped for more offensive production from the defenceman, who joined Philadelphia's league-worst power play unit. During the Flyers' February 25 game against the Pittsburgh Penguins, Drysdale injured his left shoulder on a hit from Jansen Harkins. Although the injury was less severe than initially feared, Drysdale missed the next month of play, returning on April 1 for Philadelphia's game against the New York Islanders. Following the trade, Drysdale recorded two goals and five points in 24 games for the Flyers. After the season ended, Drysdale underwent core muscle surgery for a sports hernia that he had sustained in the first game of the season.

Drysdale began the 2024–25 season on the top defensive pairing with Travis Sanheim, averaging more than 20 minutes of ice time per game. On November 9, he was injured in the Flyers' game against the Florida Panthers. He continued to work with associate coach Brad Shaw while on injured reserve, returning on December 8 against the Utah Mammoth. Upon his return, Drysdale was paired with Nick Seeler, whose defensive acumen allowed Drysdale greater movement on the ice. Although the Flyers struggled after the 4 Nations Face-Off in February, Drysdale's offensive performance increased alongside his confidence. Drysdale finished the season with seven goals, 20 points, and 102 blocked shots in 70 games. He played the final stretch on a pairing with old friend Cam York.

On July 17, 2026, Drysdale was signed to a four-year, $26 million contract by the Flyers.

== International play ==
Medal record

Men's ice hockey

Representing Canada

Hlinka Gretzky Cup
Silver medal – second place	2019 Czech Republic / Slovakia	

World Junior Championships
Gold medal – first place	2020 Czech Republic	
Silver medal – second place	2021 Canada	

Drysdale made his first international tournament appearance at the 2018 World U-17 Hockey Challenge in New Brunswick, where he served as captain of team Canada Black. He assisted on four goals in five tournament games for the fifth-place finishing team. Subsequently, Drysdale appeared with the Canada men's national under-18 ice hockey team at the 2019 IIHF World U18 Championships in Sweden, where he recorded two assists in seven games en route to a fourth-place finish. That same year, Drysdale captured a silver medal with Team Canada at the 2019 Hlinka Gretzky Cup, tallying five assists in five games in the process.

In 2020, at the age of 17 years and eight months, Drysdale became the youngest defenceman to appear on the Canada men's national junior ice hockey team since Jay Bouwmeester in 2001. Originally assigned as an extra defenceman for the 2020 World Junior Ice Hockey Championships, Drysdale entered the tournament during the semifinal round when Bowen Byram fell ill. From there, Drysdale recorded one goal and two assists in seven games, averaging 11 minutes and 38 seconds of ice time en route to a gold medal. Drysdale returned to Team Canada the following year for the 2021 World Junior Ice Hockey Championships in Canada, this time winning silver with two assists in seven games.

== Player profile ==
Drysdale has referred to himself as "a puck-moving [defenceman] who can move really well up the ice", and has modelled his game after Morgan Rielly and Cale Makar. Drysdale's skating ability has earned praise from teammates and coaches, and he has taken lessons from Dawn Braid to maintain this ability. While sportswriters have noted Drysdale's offensive ability, he has shown inconsistent defence and is physically undersized for his position at 5 ft 11 in (1.80 m) and 190 lb (86 kg).

== Career statistics ==
=== Regular season and playoffs ===
			Regular season					Playoffs
Season	Team	League	GP	G	A	Pts	PIM	GP	G	A	Pts	PIM
2017–18	St. Michael's Buzzers	OJHL	1	0	0	0	0	—	—	—	—	—
2018–19	Erie Otters	OHL	63	7	33	40	20	—	—	—	—	—
2019–20	Erie Otters	OHL	49	9	38	47	24	—	—	—	—	—
2020–21	San Diego Gulls	AHL	14	4	6	10	6	3	0	2	2	0
2020–21	Anaheim Ducks	NHL	24	3	5	8	6	—	—	—	—	—
2021–22	Anaheim Ducks	NHL	81	4	28	32	16	—	—	—	—	—
2022–23	Anaheim Ducks	NHL	8	0	0	0	2	—	—	—	—	—
2023–24	Anaheim Ducks	NHL	10	1	4	5	4	—	—	—	—	—
2023–24	Philadelphia Flyers	NHL	24	2	3	5	4	—	—	—	—	—
2024–25	Philadelphia Flyers	NHL	70	7	13	20	22	—	—	—	—	—
2025–26	Philadelphia Flyers	NHL	78	8	24	32	33	10	2	2	4	10
NHL totals			295	25	77	102	87	10	2	2	4	10

=== International ===
Year	Team	Event	Result	GP	G	A	Pts	PIM
2018	Canada Black	U17	5th	5	0	4	4	2
2019	Canada	U18	4th	7	0	2	2	0
2019	Canada	HG18	2nd place, silver medalist(s)	5	0	5	5	0
2020	Canada	WJC	1st place, gold medalist(s)	7	1	2	3	0
2021	Canada	WJC	2nd place, silver medalist(s)	7	0	2	2	0
Junior totals				31	1	15	16	2

== Awards and honours ==
Award	Year(s)	Ref
GTHL
Player of the Year	2018	
OHL
First All-Rookie Team	2019	
First All-Star Team	2020	

Awards and achievements
Preceded by Brayden Tracey	Anaheim Ducks first-round draft pick 2020	Succeeded by Jacob Perreault
