= List of Arizona Coyotes players =

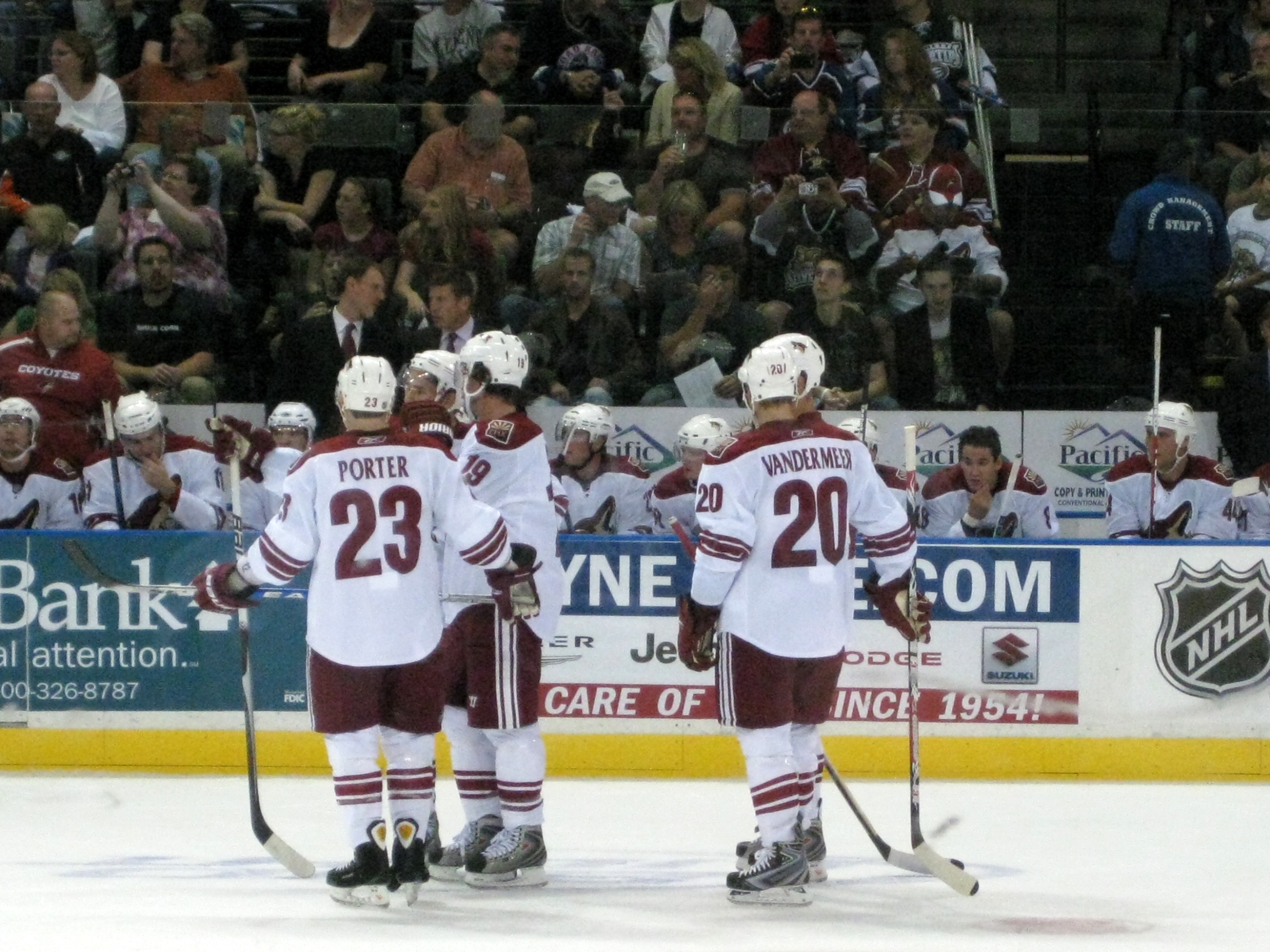
Coyotes' players during an exhibition game in Everett, Washington against the Tampa Bay Lightning in 2009

This is a list of players who played at least one game for the Arizona Coyotes of the National Hockey League (NHL) between 1996–97 and 2023–24 seasons until their existing personnel were transferred to the Utah Mammoth in 2024.

== Key ==
- Current NHL player.
- Hockey Hall of Famer, or retired number.

Abbreviations
HHOF	Elected to the Hockey Hall of Fame
Ret	Retired number
C	Center
D	Defenseman
L	Left wing
R	Right wing

Goaltenders
W	Wins
L	Losses
T	Ties
OTL ^{a}	Overtime losses
SO	Shutouts
GAA	Goals against average
SV%	Save percentage

Skaters
GP	Games played
G	Goals
A	Assists
Pts	Points
PIM	Penalty minutes

The "Seasons" column lists the first year of the season of the player's first game and the last year of the season of the player's last game. For example, a player who played one game in the 2000–2001 season would be listed as playing with the team from 2000–2001, regardless of what calendar year the game occurred within.

Statistics complete as of the 2022–2023 NHL season.

== Goaltenders ==
			Regular season								Playoffs						
Player	Nationality	Years	GP	W	L	T	OTL	SO	GAA	SV%	GP	W	L	OTL	SO	GAA	SV%
David Aebischer	(Switzerland)	2007–2008	1	0	1	0	0	0	3.00	0.909	—	—	—	—	—	—	—
Alex Auld	(Canada)	2007–2008	9	3	6	0	0	1	3.54	0.880	—	—	—	—	—	—	—
Zac Bierk	(Canada)	2002–2004	20	4	10	3	0	1	2.46	0.924	—	—	—	—	—	—	—
Brian Boucher	(United States)	2002–2006	96	28	45	18	0	5	2.98	0.898	—	—	—	—	—	—	—
Ilya Bryzgalov	(Russia)	2007–2011	257	130	93	0	27	21	2.54	0.917	11	3	8	0	0	3.77	0.896
Sean Burke	(Canada)	1999–2004	211	97	78	29	0	15	2.39	0.919	10	2	8	0	0	2.94	0.903
Matt Climie	(Canada)	2010–2011	1	0	0	0	0	0	1.85	0.938	—	—	—	—	—	—	—
Patrick Desrochers	(Canada)	2000–2003	9	1	5	1	0	0	3.73	0.861	0	0	0	0	0	0.00	0.000
Louis Domingue	(Canada)	2014–2018	84	27	41	0	7	2	3.00	0.906	—	—	—	—	—	—	—
Devan Dubnyk	(Canada)	2014–2015	19	9	5	0	2	1	2.72	0.916	—	—	—	—	—	—	—
Parris Duffus	(United States)	1996–1997	1	0	0	0	0	0	2.08	0.875	—	—	—	—	—	—	—
Robert Esche	(United States)	1998–2002	58	18	24	6	0	3	2.97	0.897	0	0	0	0	0	0.00	0.000
Bob Essensa	(Canada)	1999–2000	30	13	10	3	0	1	2.78	0.898	—	—	—	—	—	—	—
Thomas Greiss	(Germany)	2013–2014	25	10	8	0	5	2	2.29	0.920	—	—	—	—	—	—	—
Adin Hill	(Canada)	2017–2021	49	19	21	0	4	3	2.79	0.909	—	—	—	—	—	—	—
Carter Hutton	(Canada)	2021–2022	3	0	2	0	0	0	7.76	0.741	—	—	—	—	—	—	—
Connor Ingram	(Canada)	2022–2024	77	29	34	0	11	7	3.08	0.907	—	—	—	—	—	—	—
Pat Jablonski	(United States)	1996–1997	2	0	1	0	0	0	2.04	0.917	—	—	—	—	—	—	—
Brent Johnson	(United States)	2003–2004	8	1	6	1	0	0	2.59	0.914	—	—	—	—	—	—	—
Chad Johnson	(Canada)	2012–2013	4	2	0	0	2	1	1.22	0.954	—	—	—	—	—	—	—
Curtis Joseph	(Canada)	2005–2007	115	50	52	0	5	8	3.04	0.898	—	—	—	—	—	—	—
Nikolai Khabibulin	(Russia)	1996–1999	205	92	84	23	0	19	2.58	0.910	18	8	9	0	1	2.60	0.918
Josef Korenar	(Czech Republic)	2021–2022	2	0	0	0	0	0	2.56	0.914	—	—	—	—	—	—	—
Darcy Kuemper	(Canada)	2017–2021	121	55	48	0	15	10	2.43	0.920	9	4	5	0	0	3.47	0.913
Jason LaBarbera	(Canada)	2009–2013	68	22	26	0	9	2	2.64	0.918	—	—	—	—	—	—	—
Marek Langhamer	(Czech Republic)	2016–2018	2	0	0	0	0	0	1.35	0.944	—	—	—	—	—	—	—
Scott Langkow	(Canada)	1997–1999	4	0	1	1	0	0	4.53	0.831	—	—	—	—	—	—	—
David Leneveu	(Canada)	2005–2007	21	5	9	0	2	0	3.38	0.888	—	—	—	—	—	—	—
Curtis McElhinney	(Canada)	2011–2012	2	1	0	0	0	0	1.67	0.944	—	—	—	—	—	—	—
Mike McKenna	(United States)	2014–2015	1	0	1	0	0	0	5.00	0.853	—	—	—	—	—	—	—
Hunter Miska	(United States)	2018–2019	1	0	0	0	0	0	3.28	0.889	—	—	—	—	—	—	—
Al Montoya	(United States)	2008–2009	5	3	1	0	0	1	2.08	0.925	—	—	—	—	—	—	—
Michael Morrison	(United States)	2006–2007	4	0	3	0	0	0	6.13	0.790	—	—	—	—	—	—	—
Jean-Marc Pelletier	(United States)	2002–2004	6	1	3	0	0	0	3.68	0.864	—	—	—	—	—	—	—
Justin Peters	(Canada)	2016–2017	3	0	1	0	0	0	3.16	0.900	—	—	—	—	—	—	—
Calvin Pickard	(Canada)	2018–2019	6	0	4	0	0	0	3.61	0.892	—	—	—	—	—	—	—
Ivan Prosvetov	(Russia)	2020–2023	13	4	6	0	1	0	4.07	0.871	—	—	—	—	—	—	—
Antti Raanta	(Finland)	2017–2021	104	46	42	0	11	5	2.57	0.921	2	0	0	0	0	6.00	0.714
Harri Sateri	(Finland)	2021–2022	6	2	2	0	1	0	4.22	0.866	—	—	—	—	—	—	—
Philippe Sauve	(United States)	2005–2006	5	0	4	0	0	0	5.46	0.867	—	—	—	—	—	—	—
Mikhail Shtalenkov	(Russia)	1998–2000	19	8	8	3	0	2	2.35	0.905	—	—	—	—	—	—	—
Mike Smith	(Canada)	2011–2017	312	128	132	0	41	22	2.69	0.916	16	9	7	3	3	1.99	0.944
Mikael Tellqvist	(Sweden)	2006–2009	67	27	24	0	6	4	3.06	0.897	—	—	—	—	—	—	—
Josh Tordjman	(Canada)	2008–2009	2	0	2	0	0	0	4.08	0.871	—	—	—	—	—	—	—
Karel Vejmelka	(Czech Republic)	2021–2024	140	44	75	0	11	5	3.50	0.898	—	—	—	—	—	—	—
Matt Villalta	(Canada)	2023–2024	2	0	1	0	0	0	4.17	0.828	—	—	—	—	—	—	—
Mark Visentin	(Canada)	2013–2015	1	0	1	0	0	0	3.06	0.906	—	—	—	—	—	—	—
Scott Wedgewood	(Canada)	2017–2018; 2021–2022	46	15	21	0	6	1	3.28	0.904	—	—	—	—	—	—	—
Jimmy Waite	(Canada)	1997–1999	33	11	11	5	0	2	2.45	0.903	4	0	3	0	0	3.85	0.887
Darcy Wakaluk	(Canada)	1996–1997	16	8	3	1	0	1	2.99	0.899	—	—	—	—	—	—	—

== Skaters ==
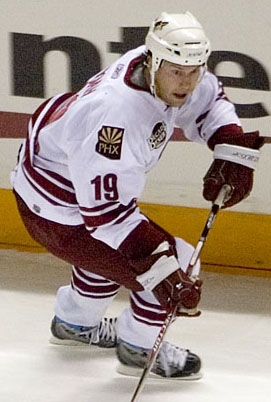
Shane Doan was captain of the Coyotes from 2003–17

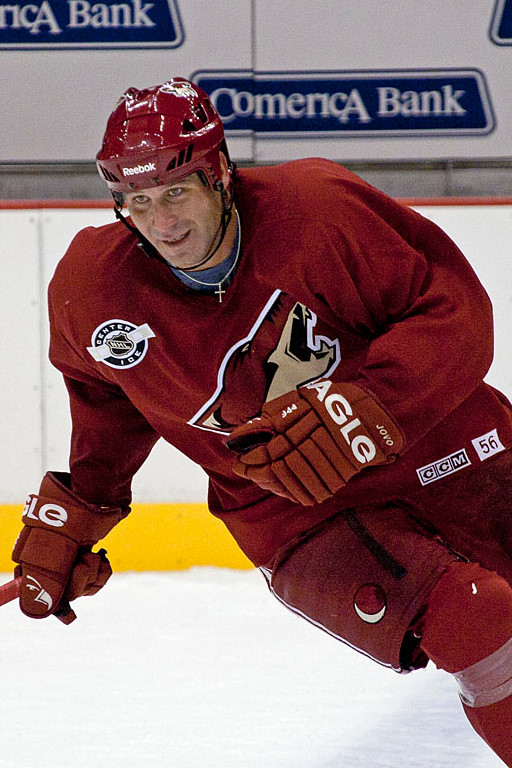
Ed Jovanovski played five seasons with Phoenix

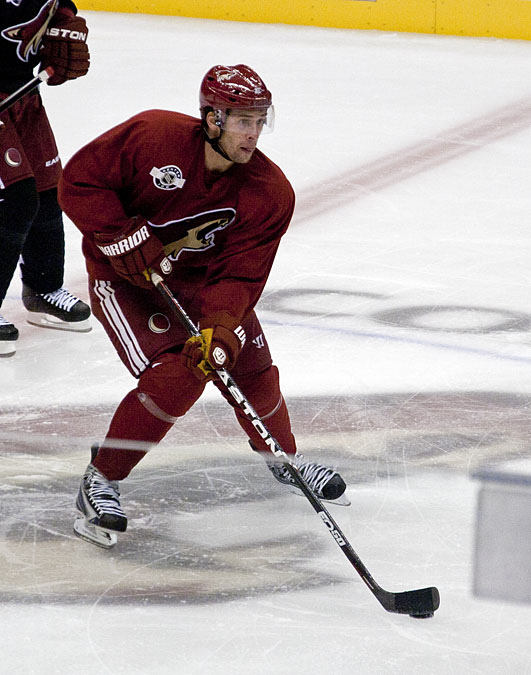
Wojtek Wolski registered 34 points while playing for the Coyotes

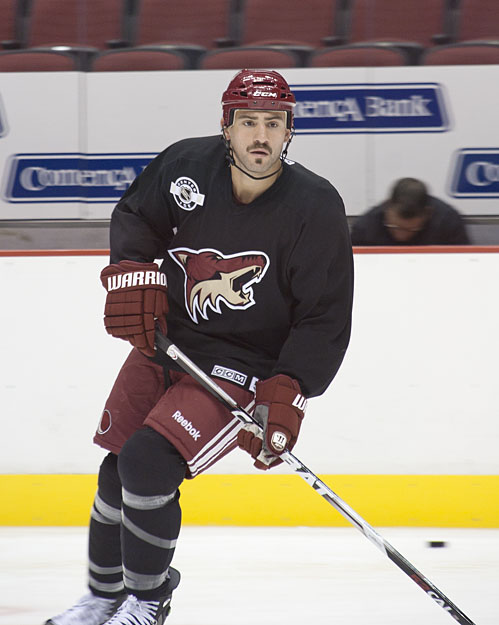
Paul Bissonnette served as an enforcer for the Coyotes

				Regular season					Playoffs				
Player	Nationality	Position	Years	GP	G	A	Pts	PIM	GP	G	A	Pts	PIM
Ramzi Abid	(Canada)	L	2002–2003	30	10	8	18	30	—	—	—	—	—
Greg Adams	(Canada)	L	1998–2000	144	38	51	89	40	8	1	0	1	0
Kevyn Adams	(United States)	C	2006–2007	33	1	7	8	8	—	—	—	—	—
Mika Alatalo	(Finland)	L	1999–2001	152	17	29	46	58	5	0	0	0	2
Tony Amonte	(United States)	R	2002–2003	59	13	23	36	26	—	—	—	—	—
Josh Archibald	(Canada)	R	2017–2019	107	17	16	33	40	—	—	—	—	—
Mark Arcobello	(United States)	C	2014–2015	27	9	7	16	6	—	—	—	—	—
Adrian Aucoin	(Canada)	D	2009–2012	221	13	46	59	150	22	0	4	4	22
Keith Ballard	(Canada)	D	2005–2008	233	19	68	87	243	—	—	—	—	—
Frank Banham	(Canada)	R	2002–2003	5	0	0	0	2	—	—	—	—	—
Murray Baron	(Canada)	D	1996–1998	53	1	5	6	110	7	0	2	2	6
Jay Beagle	(Canada)	C	2021–2022	33	1	1	2	27	—	—	—	—	—
Eric Belanger	(Canada)	C	2010–2011	82	13	27	40	36	4	0	0	0	2
Brendan Bell	(Canada)	D	2006–2008	16	0	2	2	8	—	—	—	—	—
Drake Berehowsky	(Canada)	D	2001–2003	39	2	6	8	69	5	0	1	1	4
Sergei Berezin	(Russia)	L	2001–2002	41	7	9	16	4	—	—	—	—	—
Goran Bezina	(Switzerland)	D	2003–2004	3	0	0	0	2	—	—	—	—	—
Paul Bissonnette	(Canada)	L	2009–2014	187	7	14	21	318	4	0	0	0	15
Nick Bjugstad	(United States)	C	2022–2024	135	35	33	68	85	—	—	—	—	—
Mikkel Boedker	(Denmark)	L	2008–2016	445	80	133	213	86	20	4	5	9	2
Alexandre Bolduc	(Canada)	C	2011–2015	19	0	0	0	6	—	—	—	—	—
Sebastien Bordeleau	(Canada)	C	2001–2002	6	0	0	0	2	—	—	—	—	—
Joel Bouchard	(Canada)	D	2000–2001	32	1	2	3	22	—	—	—	—	—
Tyler Bouck	(Canada)	L	2001–2002	7	0	0	0	4	—	—	—	—	—
Travis Boyd	(United States)	C	2021–2024	172	34	43	77	62	—	—	—	—	—
Nick Boynton	(Canada)	D	2006–2008	138	5	18	23	263	—	—	—	—	—
Derick Brassard	(Canada)	C	2020–2021	53	8	12	20	12	—	—	—	—	—
Pavel Brendl	(Czech Republic)	R	2005–2006	2	0	0	0	0	—	—	—	—	—
Daniel Briere	(Canada)	C	1997–2003	258	70	76	146	146	6	2	1	3	2
Chris Brown	(United States)	C	2012–2014	11	0	0	0	19	—	—	—	—	—
Josh Brown	(Canada)	D	2022–2024	119	7	10	17	162	—	—	—	—	—
Gilbert Brule	(Canada)	C	2011–2014	36	5	9	14	13	12	2	1	3	0
Kelly Buchberger	(Canada)	R	2002–2003	79	3	9	12	109	—	—	—	—	—
Michael Bunting	(Canada)	L	2018–2021	26	11	3	14	14	—	—	—	—	—
Alexander Burmistrov	(Russia)	C	2016–2017	26	5	9	14	6	—	—	—	—	—
Drake Caggiula	(Canada)	LW	2020–2021	27	1	6	7	15	—	—	—	—	—
Ryan Caldwell	(Canada)	D	2007–2008	2	0	0	0	2	—	—	—	—	—
Andrew Campbell	(Canada)	D	2014–2015	33	0	1	1	10	—	—	—	—	—
Kyle Capobianco	(Canada)	D	2017–2022	59	3	7	10	42	—	—	—	—	—
Daniel Carcillo	(Canada)	L	2006–2009	129	20	21	41	572	—	—	—	—	—
Michael Carcone	(Canada)	L	2021–2024	104	27	11	38	51	—	—	—	—	—
Keith Carney	(United States)	D	1997–2001	266	9	54	63	253	18	1	2	3	31
Kyle Chipchura	(Canada)	C	2011–2015	249	17	47	64	219	15	1	3	4	7
Jeffrey Christian	(Canada)	L	1997–1998	1	0	0	0	0	—	—	—	—	—
Michael Chaput	(Canada)	C	2019–2021	15	0	0	0	12	—	—	—	—	—
Jakob Chychrun	(United States)	D	2016–2023	373	60	110	170	240	9	1	0	1	8
Daniel Cleary	(Canada)	R	2003–2004	68	6	11	17	42	—	—	—	—	—
Adam Clendening	(United States)	D	2017–2018	5	0	2	2	2	—	—	—	—	—
Mike Comrie	(Canada)	C	2003–2007	132	45	50	95	91	—	—	—	—	—
Kevin Connauton	(Canada)	D	2015–2019	185	16	23	39	105	—	—	—	—	—
Chris Conner	(United States)	R	2012–2013	12	1	1	2	2	—	—	—	—	—
Logan Cooley	(United States)	C	2023–2024	82	20	24	44	18	—	—	—	—	—
Robert Corkum	(United States)	C	1996–1999	233	30	30	60	85	20	3	3	6	12
Nick Cousins	(Canada)	C	2017–2019	152	19	27	46	66	—	—	—	—	—
B. J. Crombeen	(United States)	R	2014–2015	58	3	3	6	79	—	—	—	—	—
Cameron Crotty	(Canada)	D	2023–2024	1	0	0	0	0	—	—	—	—	—
Lawson Crouse	(Canada)	L	2016–2024	504	103	94	197	324	9	2	0	2	2
David Cullen	(Canada)	D	2000–2002	16	0	0	0	6	—	—	—	—	—
Jim Cummins	(United States)	R	1997–1999	75	1	7	8	237	6	0	1	1	4
Craig Cunningham	(Canada)	C	2014–2016	29	1	4	5	4	—	—	—	—	—
Kevin Dahl	(Canada)	D	1996–1997	2	0	0	0	0	—	—	—	—	—
Klas Dahlbeck	(Sweden)	D	2014–2016	19	0	3	3	6	—	—	—	—	—
J. J. Daigneault	(Canada)	D	1998–2000	88	1	13	14	54	7	0	0	0	8
Laurent Dauphin	(Canada)	C	2015–2019; 2022–2023	56	4	1	5	28	—	—	—	—	—
Nigel Dawes	(Canada)	L	2008–2009	12	0	2	2	0	—	—	—	—	—
Jean-Sebastien Dea	(Canada)	C	2022–2023	4	0	0	0	0	—	—	—	—	—
Tony DeAngelo	(United States)	D	2016–2017	39	5	9	14	37	—	—	—	—	—
Louie Debrusk	(Canada)	L	1998–2001	115	4	3	7	191	9	2	0	2	6
Jason Demers	(Canada)	D	2017–2021	195	8	35	43	100	9	0	4	4	8
Travis Dermott	(Canada)	D	2023–2024	50	2	5	7	26	—	—	—	—	—
Boyd Devereaux	(Canada)	C	2005–2006	78	8	14	22	44	—	—	—	—	—
Gerald Diduck	(Canada)	D	1996–1999	133	9	14	23	213	16	0	2	2	32
Cam Dineen	(United States)	D	2021–2022	34	0	7	7	4	—	—	—	—	—
Josh Doan	(United States)	R	2023–2024	11	5	4	9	0	—	—	—	—	—
Shane Doan	(Canada)	R	1996–2017	1,540	402	570	972	1,353	49	15	13	28	79
Jason Doig	(Canada)	D	1997–1999	13	0	2	2	22	—	—	—	—	—
Max Domi	(Canada)	L	2015–2018	222	36	99	135	185	—	—	—	—	—
Dallas Drake	(Canada)	R	1996–2000	255	52	100	152	250	23	4	6	10	12
Anthony Duclair	(Canada)	L	2015–2018	172	34	40	74	73	—	—	—	—	—
Mathew Dumba	(Canada)	D	2023–2024	58	4	6	10	55	—	—	—	—	—
Sean Durzi	(Canada)	D	2023–2024	76	9	32	41	63	—	—	—	—	—
Christian Dvorak	(United States)	L	2016–2021	302	67	79	146	70	9	2	1	3	0
Joe Dziedzic	(United States)	L	1998–1999	2	0	0	0	0	—	—	—	—	—
Ryan Dzingel	(United States)	C	2021–2022	26	4	3	7	35	—	—	—	—	—
Dallas Eakins	(United States)	D	1996–1997	4	0	0	0	10	—	—	—	—	—
Mike Eastwood	(Canada)	C	1996–1997	33	1	3	4	4	—	—	—	—	—
Andrew Ebbett	(Canada)	C	2010–2011	33	2	3	5	4	3	0	0	0	0
Oliver Ekman-Larsson	(Sweden)	D	2010–2021	769	128	260	388	482	25	2	6	8	16
Martin Erat	(Czech Republic)	R	2013–2015	96	11	26	37	54	—	—	—	—	—
Anders Eriksson	(Sweden)	D	2009–2010	12	0	3	3	2	—	—	—	—	—
Loui Eriksson	(Sweden)	L	2021–2022	73	3	16	19	6	—	—	—	—	—
Hudson Fasching	(United States)	R	2020–2022	16	0	0	0	0	—	—	—	—	—
Todd Fedoruk	(Canada)	L	2008–2009	72	6	7	13	72	—	—	—	—	—
Brad Ference	(Canada)	D	2002–2004	78	0	6	6	131	—	—	—	—	—
Vernon Fiddler	(Canada)	C	2009–2011	147	14	38	52	92	10	1	1	2	14
Jeff Finley	(Canada)	D	1996–1997	65	3	7	10	40	1	0	0	0	2
Christian Fischer	(United States)	R	2016–2023	398	56	55	111	97	9	0	1	1	6
Patrick Fischer	(Switzerland)	C	2006–2007	27	4	6	10	24	—	—	—	—	—
Dan Focht	(Canada)	D	2001–2003	18	0	0	0	21	1	0	1	1	0
Sam Gagner	(Canada)	C	2014–2015	81	15	26	41	28	—	—	—	—	—
Sean Gagnon	(Canada)	D	1997–1999	7	0	1	1	21	—	—	—	—	—
Steve Gainey	(Canada)	L	2005–2006	20	0	1	1	20	—	—	—	—	—
Alex Galchenyuk	(United States)	C	2018–2019; 2021–2022	132	25	37	62	66	—	—	—	—	—
Conor Garland	(United States)	R	2018–2021	164	47	49	96	58	8	1	1	2	0
Mike Gartner (HHOF 2001)	(Canada)	R	1996–1998	142	44	46	90	62	12	2	2	4	22
Tyler Gaudet	(Canada)	C	2014–2017	20	1	3	4	0	—	—	—	—	—
Denis Gauthier	(Canada)	D	2005–2006	45	2	9	11	61	—	—	—	—	—
Frederik Gauthier	(Canada)	C	2020–2021	2	0	0	0	2	—	—	—	—	—
Todd Gill	(Canada)	D	1999–2000	41	1	6	7	30	—	—	—	—	—
Steven Goertzen	(Canada)	R	2008–2009	16	2	2	4	24	—	—	—	—	—
Alex Goligoski	(United States)	D	2016–2021	362	28	124	152	108	9	0	0	0	2
Boyd Gordon	(Canada)	C	2011–2013	123	12	25	37	18	16	0	2	2	6
Brandon Gormley	(Canada)	D	2013–2015	32	2	2	4	12	—	—	—	—	—
Shayne Gostisbehere	(United States)	D	2021–2023	134	24	58	82	54	—	—	—	—	—
Michael Grabner	(Austria)	R	2018–2020	87	17	10	27	14	9	3	0	3	6
Chris Gratton	(Canada)	C	2002–2004	82	11	19	30	114	—	—	—	—	—
Josh Gratton	(Canada)	L	2005–2008	64	2	1	3	223	—	—	—	—	—
Travis Green	(Canada)	C	1999–2001	147	38	36	74	108	5	2	1	3	2
Martin Grenier	(Canada)	D	2001–2003	8	0	0	0	5	—	—	—	—	—
Jordan Gross	(United States)	D	2019–2021	9	0	4	4	2	—	—	—	—	—
Dylan Guenther	(Canada)	R	2022–2024	78	24	26	50	24	—	—	—	—	—
David Hale	(United States)	D	2008–2009	48	3	6	9	36	—	—	—	—	—
Taylor Hall	(Canada)	L	2019–2020	35	10	17	27	14	9	2	4	6	10
Jeff Halpern	(United States)	C	2013–2014	69	5	7	12	24	—	—	—	—	—
Michal Handzus	(Slovakia)	C	2000–2002	89	19	34	53	55	5	0	0	0	2
Joel Hanley	(Canada)	D	2017–2018	5	0	0	0	0	—	—	—	—	—
Tavis Hansen	(Canada)	R	1996–2001	33	2	1	3	16	2	0	0	0	0
Martin Hanzal	(Czech Republic)	C	2007–2017	608	117	196	313	537	23	4	8	12	47
John Hayden	(United States)	C	2020–2021	29	2	3	5	37	—	—	—	—	—
Barrett Hayton	(Canada)	C	2019–2024	209	35	49	84	102	3	0	0	0	0
Bryan Helmer	(Canada)	D	1998–2004	28	0	1	1	33	—	—	—	—	—
Shaun Heshka	(Canada)	D	2009–2010	8	0	2	2	4	—	—	—	—	—
Vinnie Hinostroza	(United States)	C	2018–2020	140	21	40	61	28	7	0	2	2	2
Niklas Hjalmarsson	(Sweden)	D	2017–2021	198	2	27	29	94	9	0	1	1	6
Justin Hodgman	(Canada)	C	2014–2015	5	1	0	1	2	—	—	—	—	—
Jeff Hoggan	(Canada)	R	2008–2010	8	0	1	1	9	—	—	—	—	—
Benoit Hogue	(Canada)	L	1999–2000	27	3	10	13	10	5	1	2	3	2
Peter Holland	(Canada)	C	2016–2017	40	5	6	11	18	—	—	—	—	—
Ryan Hollweg	(Canada)	L	2010–2011	3	0	0	0	0	—	—	—	—	—
Darcy Hordichuk	(Canada)	L	2001–2003	26	0	0	0	96	—	—	—	—	—
Marcel Hossa	(Slovakia)	L	2007–2008	14	0	0	0	4	—	—	—	—	—
Jan Hrdina	(Czech Republic)	C	2002–2004	59	11	19	30	38	—	—	—	—	—
Mike Hudson	(Canada)	C	1996–1997	7	0	0	0	2	—	—	—	—	—
Brett Hull (HHOF 2009)	(United States)	R	2005–2006	5	0	1	1	0	—	—	—	—	—
Cale Hulse	(Canada)	D	2003–2004	82	3	17	20	123	—	—	—	—	—
Dryden Hunt	(Canada)	L	2020–2021	26	3	5	8	4	—	—	—	—	—
Jamie Huscroft	(Canada)	D	1998–1999	11	0	1	1	27	—	—	—	—	—
Bokondji Imama	(Canada)	L	2021–2023	9	1	0	1	10	—	—	—	—	—
Brad Isbister	(Canada)	L	1997–1999	98	13	12	25	148	5	0	0	0	2
Tim Jackman	(United States)	R	2005–2006	8	0	0	0	21	—	—	—	—	—
Craig Janney	(United States)	C	1996–1998	145	25	81	106	38	13	0	6	6	4
Mark Janssens	(Canada)	C	1997–1998	7	1	2	3	4	1	0	0	0	2
Dmitrij Jaskin	(Czech Republic)	R	2021–2022	12	0	1	1	4	—	—	—	—	—
Jason Jaspers	(Canada)	C	2001–2004	9	0	1	1	6	—	—	—	—	—
Jan Jenik	(Czech Republic)	R	2020–2024	22	4	2	6	20	—	—	—	—	—
James Johnson	(United States)	D	1996–1998	71	5	8	13	92	6	0	0	0	4
Mike Johnson	(Canada)	R	2000–2006	242	47	112	159	139	5	1	1	2	6
Nick Johnson	(Canada)	R	2012–2013	17	4	2	6	0	—	—	—	—	—
Olli Jokinen	(Finland)	C	2008–2009	57	21	21	42	49	—	—	—	—	—
Jean-Francois Jomphe	(Canada)	C	1998–1999	1	0	0	0	2	—	—	—	—	—
Matt Jones	(United States)	D	2005–2008	106	1	10	11	63	—	—	—	—	—
Josh Jooris	(Canada)	C	2016–2017	42	3	7	10	10	—	—	—	—	—
Chris Joseph	(Canada)	D	1999–2001	33	1	1	2	16	—	—	—	—	—
Ed Jovanovski	(Canada)	D	2006–2011	332	47	117	164	336	11	1	1	2	6
Joe Juneau	(Canada)	C	2000–2001	69	10	23	33	28	—	—	—	—	—
Niko Kapanen	(Finland)	C	2006–2008	98	12	25	37	42	—	—	—	—	—
Zack Kassian	(Canada)	R	2022–2023	51	2	0	2	50	—	—	—	—	—
Milos Kelemen	(Slovakia)	F	2022–2024	24	1	1	2	23	—	—	—	—	—
Clayton Keller	(United States)	C	2016–2024	520	166	252	418	203	9	4	3	7	0
Mario Kempe	(Sweden)	C	2017–2019	70	6	7	13	22	—	—	—	—	—
Tim Kennedy	(United States)	L	2013–2014	37	2	6	8	4	—	—	—	—	—
Alexander Kerfoot	(Canada)	C	2023–2024	82	13	32	45	26	—	—	—	—	—
Phil Kessel	(United States)	R	2019–2022	208	42	91	133	74	9	1	3	4	4
Michael Kesselring	(United States)	D	2022–2024	74	5	19	24	72	—	—	—	—	—
Chad Kilger	(Canada)	L	1996–1998	34	4	4	8	17	—	—	—	—	—
Kris King	(Canada)	L	1996–1997	81	3	11	14	185	7	0	0	0	17
Justin Kirkland	(Canada)	L	2023–2024	2	0	0	0	0	—	—	—	—	—
Ken Klee	(United States)	D	2008–2009	68	1	10	11	24	—	—	—	—	—
Rostislav Klesla	(Czech Republic)	D	2010–2014	144	7	19	26	112	19	2	6	8	11
Rob Klinkhammer	(Canada)	C	2012–2015	113	19	15	34	33	—	—	—	—	—
Patrik Koch	(Slovakia)	D	2023–2024	1	0	0	0	10	—	—	—	—	—
Krys Kolanos	(Canada)	C	2001–2006	109	17	18	35	74	2	0	0	0	6
Vladislav Kolyachonok	(Belarus)	D	2021–2024	39	2	5	7	8	—	—	—	—	—
Igor Korolev	(Russia)	C	1996–1997	41	3	7	10	28	1	0	0	0	0
Lauri Korpikoski	(Finland)	L	2009–2015	469	68	91	159	112	22	1	1	2	6
Oleg Kvasha	(Russia)	C	2005–2006	15	4	7	11	6	—	—	—	—	—
Andrew Ladd	(Canada)	L	2021–2022	51	7	5	12	47	—	—	—	—	—
Robert Lang	(Czech Republic)	C	2009–2010	64	9	20	29	28	4	0	1	1	0
Daymond Langkow	(Canada)	C	2001–2012	316	79	117	196	146	21	2	6	8	4
Georges Laraque	(Canada)	R	2006–2007	56	5	17	22	52	—	—	—	—	—
Johan Larsson	(Sweden)	L	2020–2022	81	14	15	29	54	—	—	—	—	—
Stephen Leach	(United States)	R	1998–1999	22	1	1	2	37	7	1	1	2	2
Mike Leclerc	(Canada)	L	2005–2006	35	9	12	21	29	—	—	—	—	—
Yanick Lehoux	(Canada)	C	2005–2007	10	2	2	4	6	—	—	—	—	—
Claude Lemieux	(Canada)	R	2000–2003	164	32	49	81	158	5	0	0	0	2
Jocelyn Lemieux	(Canada)	R	1996–1998	32	4	3	7	27	2	0	0	0	4
John Leonard	(United States)	L	2023–2024	6	1	0	1	0	—	—	—	—	—
Sami Lepisto	(Finland)	D	2009–2011	117	5	17	22	97	7	1	0	1	6
Lucas Lessio	(Canada)	L	2013–2015	29	2	3	5	10	—	—	—	—	—
Trevor Letowski	(Canada)	R	1998–2002	206	30	43	73	58	5	1	1	2	4
Scott Levins	(United States)	R	1997–1998	2	0	0	0	5	—	—	—	—	—
Joakim Lindstrom	(Sweden)	C	2008–2009	44	9	11	20	28	—	—	—	—	—
Enver Lisin	(Russia)	R	2006–2009	78	18	10	28	46	—	—	—	—	—
Matthew Lombardi	(Canada)	C	2008–2013	118	28	49	77	54	7	1	5	6	2
Jyrki Lumme	(Finland)	D	1998–2001	192	19	74	93	122	12	0	2	2	8
Jamie Lundmark	(Canada)	C	2005–2006	38	5	13	18	36	—	—	—	—	—
Ilya Lyubushkin	(Russia)	D	2018–2022	180	1	18	19	67	—	—	—	—	—
Matias Maccelli	(Finland)	L	2021–2024	169	29	83	112	30	—	—	—	—	—
Norm MacIver	(Canada)	D	1996–1998	73	6	15	21	62	6	0	1	1	2
Connor Mackey	(United States)	D	2022–2023	20	1	3	4	39	—	—	—	—	—
Brett MacLean	(Canada)	L	2010–2011	13	2	1	3	2	—	—	—	—	—
Donald MacLean	(Canada)	C	2006–2007	9	1	1	2	0	—	—	—	—	—
Dave Manson	(Canada)	D	1996–1997	66	3	17	20	164	—	—	—	—	—
Paul Mara	(United States)	D	2000–2006	323	38	104	142	268	5	0	0	0	4
Danny Markov	(Russia)	D	2001–2003	136	10	46	56	103	—	—	—	—	—
Jordan Martinook	(Canada)	C	2014–2018	247	26	39	65	103	—	—	—	—	—
Brad May	(Canada)	L	2000–2003	154	24	30	54	234	5	0	0	0	0
Dysin Mayo	(Canada)	D	2021–2023	82	4	8	12	35	—	—	—	—	—
Jack McBain	(Canada)	C	2021–2024	159	22	33	55	120	—	—	—	—	—
Jamie McBain	(United States)	D	2016–2017	3	0	0	0	0	—	—	—	—	—
Ben McCartney	(Canada)	L	2021–2022	2	0	0	0	4	—	—	—	—	—
Brad McCrimmon	(Canada)	D	1996–1997	37	1	5	6	18	—	—	—	—	—
Jamie McGinn	(Canada)	L	2016–2017	72	9	8	17	23	—	—	—	—	—
Tye McGinn	(Canada)	L	2014–2015	18	1	1	2	10	—	—	—	—	—
Jim McKenzie	(Canada)	L	1996–1998	129	8	7	15	346	8	0	0	0	2
Brandon McMillan	(Canada)	L	2013–2015	72	3	6	9	20	—	—	—	—	—
Nick Merkley	(Canada)	R	2017–2018	1	0	0	0	2	—	—	—	—	—
Dakota Mermis	(United States)	D	2017–2019	10	0	0	0	0	—	—	—	—	—
Freddy Meyer	(United States)	D	2007–2008	5	0	0	0	0	—	—	—	—	—
Zbynek Michalek	(Czech Republic)	D	2005–2017	612	32	108	140	258	7	0	2	2	2
Andy Miele	(United States)	C	2011–2014	15	0	2	2	11	—	—	—	—	—
John Moore	(United States)	D	2014–2015	19	1	4	5	11	—	—	—	—	—
Jayson More	(Canada)	D	1996–1998	64	6	11	17	90	7	0	0	0	7
Derek Morris	(Canada)	D	2003–2014	544	38	114	152	462	23	3	7	10	35
Janis Moser	(Switzerland)	D	2021–2024	205	16	56	72	86	—	—	—	—	—
David Moss	(United States)	R	2012–2015	184	17	37	54	63	—	—	—	—	—
Peter Mueller	(United States)	C	2007–2010	207	39	68	107	64	—	—	—	—	—
Matt Murley	(United States)	L	2007–2008	3	0	1	1	0	—	—	—	—	—
Connor Murphy	(United States)	D	2013–2017	258	13	36	49	145	—	—	—	—	—
Trevor Murphy	(Canada)	D	2017–2018	8	1	2	3	0	—	—	—	—	—
Garth Murray	(Canada)	C	2008–2009	10	0	0	0	12	—	—	—	—	—
Rob Murray	(Canada)	C	1998–1999	13	1	2	3	4	—	—	—	—	—
Ladislav Nagy	(Slovakia)	L	2000–2007	321	92	157	249	312	5	0	0	0	21
Riley Nash	(Canada)	C	2021–2022	10	0	0	0	2	—	—	—	—	—
Tyson Nash	(Canada)	L	2003–2006	119	3	11	14	194	—	—	—	—	—
Andrei Nazarov	(Russia)	L	2001–2004	122	10	5	15	311	3	0	0	0	2
Stan Neckar	(Czech Republic)	D	1998–2001	130	4	11	15	109	11	0	1	1	4
Petr Nedved	(Czech Republic)	C	2005–2006	25	2	9	11	34	—	—	—	—	—
Patrik Nemeth	(Sweden)	D	2022–2023	75	0	5	5	30	—	—	—	—	—
Aaron Ness	(United States)	D	2019–2021	25	0	1	1	0	—	—	—	—	—
Alexander Nikulin	(Russia)	C	2008–2009	1	0	0	0	0	—	—	—	—	—
Petteri Nokelainen	(Finland)	C	2009–2012	22	1	2	3	6	5	0	0	0	2
Owen Nolan	(Canada)	R	2006–2007	76	16	24	40	56	—	—	—	—	—
Brian Noonan	(United States)	R	1998–1999	7	0	0	0	0	5	0	2	2	4
Ivan Novoseltsev	(Russia)	R	2003–2004	17	2	0	2	6	—	—	—	—	—
Teppo Numminen (Ret # 27)	(Finland)	D	1996–2003	551	55	214	269	190	24	6	5	11	6
Liam O'Brien	(Canada)	C	2021–2024	170	10	18	28	373	—	—	—	—	—
Lyle Odelein	(Canada)	D	1999–2000	16	1	7	8	19	5	0	0	0	16
Sean O'Donnell	(Canada)	D	2005–2006	57	1	7	8	121	—	—	—	—	—
Jordan Oesterle	(United States)	D	2018–2021	172	10	34	44	36	9	1	3	4	0
David Oliver	(Canada)	R	1999–2000	9	1	0	1	2	—	—	—	—	—
Cal O'Reilly	(Canada)	C	2011–2012	22	2	3	5	2	—	—	—	—	—
Patrick O'Sullivan	(Canada)	C	2011–2012	23	2	2	4	2	—	—	—	—	—
Richard Panik	(Slovakia)	R	2017–2019	110	22	30	52	56	—	—	—	—	—
Denis Pederson	(Canada)	C	2001–2002	19	1	1	2	20	5	0	2	2	0
Lane Pederson	(Canada)	F	2020–2021	15	1	2	3	2	—	—	—	—	—
Scott Pellerin	(Canada)	L	2002–2003	23	0	1	1	8	—	—	—	—	—
Brendan Perlini	(Canada)	L	2016–2019	153	33	24	57	56	—	—	—	—	—
Joel Perrault	(Canada)	C	2005–2010	78	12	14	26	68	—	—	—	—	—
Yanic Perreault	(Canada)	C	2006–2007	49	19	14	33	30	—	—	—	—	—
Michel Petit	(Canada)	D	1997–1998	32	4	2	6	77	5	0	0	0	8
Tyler Pitlick	(United States)	C	2020–2021	38	6	5	11	16	—	—	—	—	—
Kevin Porter	(United States)	C	2008–2010	38	5	5	10	4	—	—	—	—	—
Marc-Antoine Pouliot	(Canada)	C	2011–2012	13	0	4	4	2	8	1	1	2	2
Petr Prucha	(Czech Republic)	R	2008–2011	109	15	18	33	33	7	1	2	3	4
Brandon Prust	(Canada)	L	2008–2009	11	0	1	1	29	—	—	—	—	—
Teemu Pulkkinen	(Finland)	R	2016–2017	4	1	0	1	4	—	—	—	—	—
Taylor Pyatt	(Canada)	L	2009–2012	223	39	34	73	89	27	6	3	9	4
Deron Quint	(United States)	D	1996–2003	220	22	43	65	82	7	0	2	2	0
Branko Radivojevic	(Slovakia)	R	2001–2004	150	25	31	56	103	1	0	0	0	2
Brad Ralph	(Canada)	L	2000–2001	1	0	0	0	0	—	—	—	—	—
Paul Ranheim	(United States)	L	2002–2003	40	3	4	7	10	—	—	—	—	—
Aku Raty	(Finland)	R	2023–2024	1	0	1	1	0	—	—	—	—	—
Dylan Reese	(United States)	D	2014–2015	1	0	0	0	0	—	—	—	—	—
Robert Reichel	(Czech Republic)	C	1998–1999	13	7	6	13	4	7	1	3	4	2
Steve Reinprecht	(Canada)	C	2005–2009	231	51	92	143	82	—	—	—	—	—
Todd Reirden	(United States)	D	2003–2004	7	0	2	2	4	—	—	—	—	—
Mikael Renberg	(Sweden)	R	1999–2000	10	2	4	6	2	5	1	2	3	4
Pascal Rheaume	(Canada)	C	2005–2006	1	0	0	0	0	—	—	—	—	—
Mike Ribeiro	(Canada)	C	2013–2014	80	16	31	47	52	—	—	—	—	—
Mike Ricci	(Canada)	C	2005–2007	85	10	7	17	73	—	—	—	—	—
Brad Richardson	(Canada)	C	2015–2020	299	44	49	93	148	9	2	1	3	4
Tobias Rieder	(Germany)	C	2014–2018	292	51	60	111	36	—	—	—	—	—
Zac Rinaldo	(Canada)	C	2017–2018	53	5	2	7	44	—	—	—	—	—
Brett Ritchie	(Canada)	R	2022–2023	16	2	3	5	2	—	—	—	—	—
Nick Ritchie	(Canada)	L	2021–2023	82	19	16	35	63	—	—	—	—	—
Jamie Rivers	(Canada)	D	2005–2006	18	0	5	5	26	—	—	—	—	—
Travis Roche	(Canada)	D	2006–2007	50	6	13	19	22	—	—	—	—	—
Jeremy Roenick (HHOF 2024)	(United States)	C	1996–2007	454	152	227	379	596	18	9	9	18	18
Cliff Ronning	(Canada)	C	1996–1999	156	32	81	113	64	13	1	10	11	16
Antoine Roussel	(France)	L	2021–2022	53	4	4	8	59	—	—	—	—	—
Michal Rozsival	(Czech Republic)	D	2010–2012	87	4	15	19	54	19	0	0	0	4
David Rundblad	(Sweden)	D	2011–2014	26	0	5	5	6	—	—	—	—	—
Mike Rupp	(United States)	L	2003–2006	7	0	1	1	6	—	—	—	—	—
Adam Ruzicka	(Slovakia)	C	2023–2024	3	0	0	0	6	—	—	—	—	—
Kirill Safronov	(Russia)	D	2001–2002	1	0	0	0	0	—	—	—	—	—
Henrik Samuelsson	(United States)	R	2014–2015	3	0	0	0	2	—	—	—	—	—
Philip Samuelsson	(United States)	D	2014–2015	4	0	0	0	0	—	—	—	—	—
Geoff Sanderson	(Canada)	L	2005–2006	75	25	21	46	58	—	—	—	—	—
Zach Sanford	(United States)	L	2023–2024	11	0	2	2	4	—	—	—	—	—
Oleg Saprykin	(Russia)	L	2005–2007	126	25	34	59	104	—	—	—	—	—
Kurt Sauer	(United States)	D	2008–2010	69	1	6	7	36	—	—	—	—	—
Brian Savage	(Canada)	L	2001–2004	134	24	29	53	66	5	0	0	0	0
Kevin Sawyer	(Canada)	L	1999–2000	3	0	0	0	12	—	—	—	—	—
Dave Scatchard	(Canada)	C	2005–2007	93	14	17	31	156	—	—	—	—	—
Luke Schenn	(Canada)	D	2016–2018	142	2	13	15	120	—	—	—	—	—
David Schlemko	(Canada)	D	2008–2015	207	9	41	50	76	9	1	0	1	4
Nick Schmaltz	(United States)	C	2018–2024	344	93	176	269	82	—	—	—	—	—
Mathieu Schneider	(United States)	D	2009–2010	8	0	4	4	4	3	1	0	1	0
Dennis Seidenberg	(Germany)	D	2005–2007	66	2	11	13	30	—	—	—	—	—
Darrin Shannon	(Canada)	L	1996–1998	140	13	25	38	67	12	3	2	5	8
Brendan Shinnimin	(Canada)	C	2014–2015	12	0	1	1	8	—	—	—	—	—
Mike Sillinger	(Canada)	C	2003–2004	60	8	6	14	54	—	—	—	—	—
Jason Simon	(Canada)	L	1996–1997	1	0	0	0	0	—	—	—	—	—
Todd Simpson	(Canada)	D	2000–2003	146	4	21	25	299	5	0	2	2	6
Fredrik Sjostrom	(Sweden)	L	2003–2008	261	32	41	73	126	—	—	—	—	—
John Slaney	(Canada)	D	1997–1998	55	3	14	17	24	—	—	—	—	—
Nathan Smith	(United States)	C	2021–2023	14	2	2	4	6	—	—	—	—	—
Wyatt Smith	(United States)	C	1999–2002	54	3	7	10	13	—	—	—	—	—
Carl Soderberg	(Sweden)	C	2019–2020	70	17	18	35	18	9	1	1	2	2
Victor Soderstrom	(Sweden)	D	2020–2024	53	1	10	11	30	—	—	—	—	—
Blake Speers	(Canada)	C	2021–2022	2	0	0	0	2	—	—	—	—	—
Matthew Spiller	(Canada)	D	2003–2006	59	0	1	1	67	—	—	—	—	—
Garrett Stafford	(United States)	D	2010–2011	2	0	0	0	0	—	—	—	—	—
Mike Stapleton	(Canada)	C	1996–1999	195	18	25	43	106	20	1	0	1	16
Troy Stecher	(Canada)	D	2022–2024	108	1	11	12	53	—	—	—	—	—
Lee Stempniak	(United States)	R	2009–2011	100	33	23	56	27	11	0	2	2	0
Derek Stepan	(United States)	C	2017–2020	224	39	80	119	56	9	1	4	5	6
Michael Stone	(Canada)	D	2011–2017	324	24	72	96	190	2	0	0	0	0
Anton Stralman	(Sweden)	D	2021–2022	74	8	15	23	12	—	—	—	—	—
Dylan Strome	(Canada)	C	2016–2019	48	7	9	16	14	—	—	—	—	—
Mike Stutzel	(Canada)	L	2003–2004	9	0	0	0	0	—	—	—	—	—
Radoslav Suchy	(Slovakia)	D	1999–2004	372	12	51	63	74	10	1	1	2	0
Michael Sullivan	(United States)	C	1998–2002	256	13	20	33	66	10	0	1	1	2
Steve Sullivan	(Canada)	L	2012–2013	33	5	7	12	20	—	—	—	—	—
Chris Summers	(United States)	D	2010–2015	64	2	7	9	47	—	—	—	—	—
Maksymilian Szuber	(Germany)	D	2023–2024	1	0	0	0	2	—	—	—	—	—
Jordan Szwarz	(Canada)	R	2013–2015	35	4	0	4	21	—	—	—	—	—
Jeff Taffe	(United States)	L	2002–2007	98	15	13	28	26	—	—	—	—	—
David Tanabe	(United States)	D	2003–2006	66	5	11	16	30	—	—	—	—	—
Bill Thomas	(United States)	R	2005–2008	40	9	8	17	10	—	—	—	—	—
Brent Thompson	(Canada)	D	1996–1997	1	0	0	0	7	—	—	—	—	—
Viktor Tikhonov	(Russia)	R	2008–2009	61	8	8	16	20	—	—	—	—	—
Brad Tiley	(Canada)	D	1997–1999	9	0	0	0	0	1	0	0	0	0
Conor Timmins	(Canada)	D	2021–2023	8	0	0	0	0	—	—	—	—	—
Mathias Tjarnqvist	(Sweden)	L	2006–2008	104	9	11	20	36	—	—	—	—	—
Keith Tkachuk (HHOF 2026)	(United States)	L	1996–2001	332	179	155	334	716	25	11	7	18	34
Rick Tocchet	(Canada)	R	1997–2000	213	64	66	130	371	13	6	5	11	33
Raffi Torres	(Canada)	L	2011–2013	107	20	18	38	96	3	1	1	2	2
Jean-Guy Trudel	(Canada)	L	1999–2002	4	0	0	0	2	—	—	—	—	—
Kyle Turris	(Canada)	C	2007–2012	137	19	27	46	43	4	1	2	3	2
Oleg Tverdovsky	(Russia)	D	1996–1999	210	24	75	99	74	19	0	10	10	6
Scottie Upshall	(Canada)	L	2008–2011	129	42	30	72	118	—	—	—	—	—
Ossi Vaananen	(Finland)	D	2000–2004	291	10	35	45	333	5	0	0	0	6
Juuso Valimaki	(Finland)	D	2022–2024	146	6	45	51	71	—	—	—	—	—
Jim Vandermeer	(Canada)	D	2009–2010	62	4	8	12	60	—	—	—	—	—
Pete Vandermeer	(Canada)	L	2007–2008	2	0	0	0	0	—	—	—	—	—
Andrei Vasilyev	(Russia)	L	1998–1999	1	0	0	0	0	—	—	—	—	—
Antoine Vermette	(Canada)	C	2011–2015; 2015–2016	291	70	79	149	223	16	5	5	10	24
Joe Vitale	(United States)	C	2014–2015	70	3	6	9	36	—	—	—	—	—
Radim Vrbata	(Czech Republic)	R	2007–2014; 2016–2017	509	157	186	343	134	27	6	8	14	12
Todd Warriner	(Canada)	L	2001–2002	18	0	3	3	8	—	—	—	—	—
Matt Watkins	(Canada)	R	2011–2012	1	0	0	0	0	—	—	—	—	—
Jordan Weal	(Canada)	C	2018–2019	19	1	1	2	0	—	—	—	—	—
Craig Weller	(Canada)	R	2007–2008	59	3	8	11	80	—	—	—	—	—
Erik Westrum	(United States)	C	2003–2004	15	1	1	2	20	—	—	—	—	—
Ryan White	(Canada)	L	2016–2017	46	7	6	13	70	—	—	—	—	—
Ray Whitney	(Canada)	L	2010–2012	157	41	93	134	52	20	3	7	10	12
Landon Wilson	(United States)	R	2000–2004	183	32	36	68	180	4	0	0	0	12
Daniel Winnik	(Canada)	C	2007–2010	202	18	34	52	100	7	0	0	0	0
Wojtek Wolski	(Canada)	L	2009–2011	54	12	22	34	16	7	4	1	5	0
Keith Yandle	(United States)	D	2006–2015	558	65	246	311	372	27	3	16	19	14
Brandon Yip	(Canada)	R	2013–2014	2	0	0	0	0	—	—	—	—	—
Juha Ylonen	(Finland)	C	1996–2001	261	22	65	87	80	3	0	2	2	2
Nolan Yonkman	(Canada)	D	2010–2011	16	0	1	1	39	—	—	—	—	—
Mike York	(United States)	L	2007–2008	63	6	8	14	4	—	—	—	—	—
Mike Zigomanis	(Canada)	C	2006–2008	108	16	10	26	52	—	—	—	—	—
Jason Zucker	(United States)	L	2023–2024	51	9	16	25	58	—	—	—	—	—

== See also ==
- List of NHL players

== Notes ==
a: As of the 2005–2006 NHL season, all games have a winner; teams losing in overtime and shootouts are awarded one point thus the OTL stat replacees the tie statistic. The OTL column also includes SOL (Shootout losses).
