= Darin Pastor =

American businessman (1971–2023)

- Born: Darin Richard Pastor; February 19, 1971; Buffalo, New York, US
- Died: March 25, 2023 (aged 52)
- Occupations: Chairman, CEO of Capstone Financial Group

Darin Richard Pastor (February 19, 1971 — March 25, 2023) was an American businessman and entrepreneur. He was the Chairman and Chief Executive Officer of Capstone Financial Group, Inc. Pastor had previously worked at the financial firm JPMorgan Chase.

On August 18, 2022, a federal grand jury issued an indictment charging Pastor and a collaborator with conspiracy to commit wire fraud and securities fraud. It was alleged by authorities that Pastor maintained a fraudulent Wikipedia page to back up claims that he was wealthy, which allowed potential investors in his business Capstone Group to find his information online.

== Education ==
Pastor majored in psychology and sociology at Drexel University in Philadelphia, Pennsylvania. He enrolled in the Wharton School of the University of Pennsylvania.

== Career ==
Pastor worked at JPMorgan Chase & Co. for four years, where he was senior vice president and senior investment manager. In 2010, Pastor became the territory sales manager for the Colonial Life & Accident Insurance Company.

In October 2012, Pastor and five financial advisors founded Capstone Affluent Strategies.

In 2013, Pastor submitted a bid to acquire the NHL’s Phoenix Coyotes franchise. The NHL rejected Pastor's bid on May 13, 2013, citing the bid was "inconsistent with what we had previously indicated were the minimum prerequisites" of a bid.

== Criminal charges ==
In August 2018, he inappropriately touched a woman on a flight. He was sentenced to probation.

In August 18, 2022, a federal grand jury issued an indictment charging Pastor and a collaborator with conspiracy to commit wire fraud and securities fraud. Authorities said that Pastor maintained a fraudulent Wikipedia page to back up claims that he was wealthy, which allowed potential investors in his business Capstone Group to find his information online. The fraud allegedly began in 2013 when Pastor and Halford W. Johnson acquired Creative App Solutions, a publicly traded company, whose name was then changed to Capstone Financial Group. From 2013 to 2017, 95 investors bought 19 million dollars of Capstone stock. Presentations made to investors regarding the company's assets were false.

== Family ==
The Pastor family owned the Pepsi-Cola Buffalo Bottling Corp., a former regional Pepsi distribution business sold in 2002.
