= Dawn Braid =

Canadian skating coach

- Occupation: Skating coach

Dawn Braid is a Canadian skating coach and consultant. She was the first woman to hold a full-time coaching job in the National Hockey League.

== Career ==
She grew up in Woodbridge, Ontario, and competed as a figure skater at a national level in her youth. At the age of 17, she began coaching ice hockey players in skating techniques, working as a novice coach at in Toronto and for the junior B Vaughan Raiders team, owned by her father.

In 2005, she was hired by the National Hockey League's Toronto Maple Leafs to teach at their development camp. She would then go on to work as a consultant for several NHL teams, including the Buffalo Sabres, Anaheim Ducks, and Calgary Flames, as well as coaching a number of Ontario Hockey League players, including John Tavares and Ryan Merkley. In 2016, she was hired as a full-time skating coach by Arizona Coyotes, the first woman to hold a full-time coaching job in the NHL, and not just a part-time or temporary consulting position. After two years with the Coyotes, she left the team to return to her consultancy work.

She was named one of the 25 most powerful women in hockey by Sportsnet in 2020.

== Personal life ==
Her son, Mackenzie Braid, played 14 games professionally in the ECHL.
