= Arizona Coyotes =

Inactive ice hockey team in Arizona, US

- Founded: 1996 (Note: Originally established as the original Winnipeg Jets in 1972, before being retroactively separated from the Jets history in 2026.)
- History: Phoenix Coyotes; 1996–2014; Arizona Coyotes; 2014–2024
- Home arena: America West Arena (1996–2003); Gila River Arena (2003–2022); Mullett Arena (2022–2024)
- Team colors: Brick red, sand, forest green, purple, sienna, process black
- Stanley Cups: 0
- Conference championships: 0
- Presidents' Trophies: 0
- Division championships: 1 (2011–12)
- Official website: nhl.com/coyotes

The Arizona Coyotes are an inactive professional ice hockey team based in the Phoenix metropolitan area. They competed in the National Hockey League (NHL) as a member of the Central Division (1996–1998, 2021–2024) and the Pacific Division (1998–2020) in the Western Conference, and the West Division (2020–2021). They played at America West Arena (now Mortgage Matchup Center) in downtown Phoenix from 1996 to 2003, at Glendale's Gila River Arena (now Desert Diamond Arena) from 2003 to 2022, and at Mullett Arena in Tempe from 2022 to 2024. The organization was established on July 1, 1996, after the players, coaches and staff of the original Winnipeg Jets relocated to Phoenix. The franchise was initially named the Phoenix Coyotes, and renamed the Arizona Coyotes on June 27, 2014.

The team failed to gain long-term stability despite the relocation to Arizona, enduring multiple changes in ownership and struggling for a profitable arena for home games. The NHL took over the Phoenix Coyotes franchise in 2009 when then-owner Jerry Moyes gave up the team after filing for bankruptcy. The NHL maintained control of the franchise until 2013, when they found new ownership willing to keep it in Arizona. Alex Meruelo became the majority owner on July 29, 2019, later becoming the franchise's sole owner following the arrest of minority owner Andrew Barroway.

The Coyotes had a difficult working relationship with the Phoenix suburb of Glendale, and negotiations with the city deteriorated in 2021. The team subsequently signed an agreement to play their games at Mullett Arena on the campus of Arizona State University, starting with the 2022–23 season. The arrangement was intended to be brief, lasting only until a new arena was built in Tempe, but the arena proposal was rejected by the city's residents in May 2023.

Amid growing pressure to resolve the arena situation and to find an alternative to a college arena considered too small even for temporary use, the Coyotes suspended hockey operations following the 2023–24 season. In a deal brokered by the NHL, the Coyotes were essentially split in half. The team's hockey assets (players, staff, and draft picks) were transferred to the Utah Hockey Club (now the Utah Mammoth), an expansion franchise awarded to owner Ryan Smith and based in Salt Lake City. The Coyotes' name, history, and other intellectual property were initially retained by Meruelo, who intended to build a new arena in Arizona by 2029. Meruelo relinquished his franchise rights and intellectual property to the NHL following a failed land auction for a new arena site in June 2024.

On September 24, 2026, the Coyotes were retroactively considered to be a 1996 expansion team after the NHL consolidated the franchise records and statistics of the original Winnipeg Jets with the current Winnipeg Jets, who began play as the Atlanta Thrashers in 1999.

== History ==
=== Establishment of the team ===
In October 1995, Minnesota businessmen Steven Gluckstern and Richard Burke purchased the Winnipeg Jets with plans to move their assets to Minneapolis–St. Paul, which had lost the Minnesota North Stars in 1993, for the 1996–97 season. However, in December, they were unable to secure a lease at Minneapolis's Target Center. Instead, they opted to move the Jets to Phoenix, instead. Minnesota was ultimately awarded an expansion team in 1997, the Minnesota Wild.

Following the Jets' deactivation at the conclusion of the 1995–96 season, the assets of the Winnipeg Jets were transferred to a new expansion team in Arizona. After the franchise considered "Mustangs", "Outlaws", "Wranglers", and "Freeze", a name-the-team contest yielded the official name "Coyotes". At the time, the name was largely seen as play on the Looney Tunes character Wile E. Coyote of Wile E. Coyote and the Road Runner, since Phoenix was home to several minor league teams and one short-lived WHA team called the Phoenix Roadrunners, including an International Hockey League (IHL) team that was playing there in 1996. However, "Coyotes" was considered suitable in any case since the coyote is endemic to the whole of Arizona, unlike the roadrunner, which is only found in the southern and western regions of the state. The Roadrunners only played one more season before leaving Phoenix; however, the Coyotes later revived the "Roadrunners" nickname for their American Hockey League affiliate, the Tucson Roadrunners.

=== Early years (1996–2005) ===
In the summer, the team added established superstar Jeremy Roenick from the Chicago Blackhawks, in exchange for trading Alexei Zhamnov. Roenick teamed up with power wingers Keith Tkachuk and Rick Tocchet to form a dynamic 1–2–3 offensive punch that led the Coyotes through their first years in Arizona. Also impressive were young players like Shane Doan (he eventually was the last remaining player from the team's days in Winnipeg), Oleg Tverdovsky, and goaltender Nikolai Khabibulin, whom the fans nicknamed the "Bulin Wall".

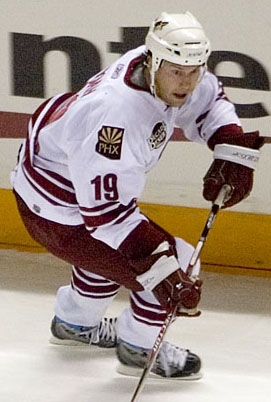
Shane Doan was team captain from 2003 to 2017. Holding the franchise record for games played, he was the last Coyotes player to have also played in Winnipeg for the original Jets.

Another key addition to the squad was veteran forward Mike Gartner, who had joined from the Toronto Maple Leafs. Despite his experience and scoring his 700th career goal on December 15, 1997, Gartner battled injuries in the latter half of the 1997–98 season. The Coyotes did not renew his contract and he retired at the end of the season. After arriving in Phoenix, the team posted six consecutive .500 or better seasons, making the playoffs in every year but one. The one time they did not make the playoffs, in 2000–01, they became the first team to earn 90 points and miss the playoffs.

The Coyotes' original home, America West Arena, was suboptimal for hockey. Although considered a state-of-the-art arena when built for the Phoenix Suns, it was designed specifically as a basketball venue, with sight lines optimized for the smaller playing surface of that sport, and not with hockey in mind. The floor was just barely large enough to fit a standard NHL rink, forcing the Coyotes to hastily re-engineer it to accommodate the 200-foot rink. The configuration left a portion of one end of the upper deck hanging over the boards and ice, obscuring almost a third of the rink and one goal from several sections. As a result, listed capacity had to be cut down from over 18,000 seats to just over 16,000 – the second-smallest in the league at the time – after the first season.

Burke bought out Gluckstern in 1998 but was unable to attract more investors to alleviate the team's financial woes. In 2001, Burke sold the team to Phoenix-area developer Steve Ellman, with Wayne Gretzky as a part-owner and head of hockey operations.

The closest that they came to advancing past the first round during their first decade in Arizona was during the 1999 playoffs. After building a 3–1 series lead, the Coyotes fell in overtime of game 7 on a goal by Pierre Turgeon of the St. Louis Blues. In 2002, the Coyotes posted 95 points, one point behind their best total as an NHL team while in Winnipeg, but went down rather meekly to the San Jose Sharks in five games.

From then until the 2007–08 season, the Coyotes were barely competitive and managed to break the 80-point barrier only once during that time. Attendance levels dropped considerably, worrying many NHL executives. In addition, an unfavorable arena lease at city-owned America West Arena had the team suffering massive financial losses (as much as $40 million a year at one point).

Ellman put forward numerous proposals to improve the hockey sightlines in America West Arena in hopes of boosting capacity back over the 17,000 mark. However, none of these got beyond the planning stages, leading Ellman to commit to building a new arena. After nearly three years of proposals to build an arena on the former Los Arcos Mall in Scottsdale and having difficulty financing the purchase of the Coyotes and finishing demolition of Los Arcos, along with infighting in the Scottsdale City Council, Ellman looked toward the West Valley, and in December 2003, the team moved into Glendale Arena (which then became known as Jobing.com Arena during the 2006–07 NHL season). Simultaneously, the team changed its logo and uniforms, moving from the multi-colored kit to a more streamlined look. In 2005, Ellman sold the Coyotes, the National Lacrosse League's Arizona Sting and the lease to Gila River Arena to trucking magnate Jerry Moyes, who was also a part-owner of Major League Baseball's Arizona Diamondbacks.

=== Gretzky era (2005–2009) ===
On August 6, 2005, Brett Hull, son of former Jet Bobby Hull, was signed and promptly assigned the elder Hull's retired number 9. Two days later, Gretzky named himself head coach, replacing Rick Bowness, despite the fact he had never coached at any level of hockey. The Coyotes "Ring of Honor" was unveiled on October 8, inducting Gretzky (who had never played for the organization, but whose number 99 was retired by all NHL teams after his retirement in 1999) and Bobby Hull. Only a week later, Brett Hull announced his retirement. On January 21, 2006, Jets great Thomas Steen was the third inductee to the "Ring of Honor".

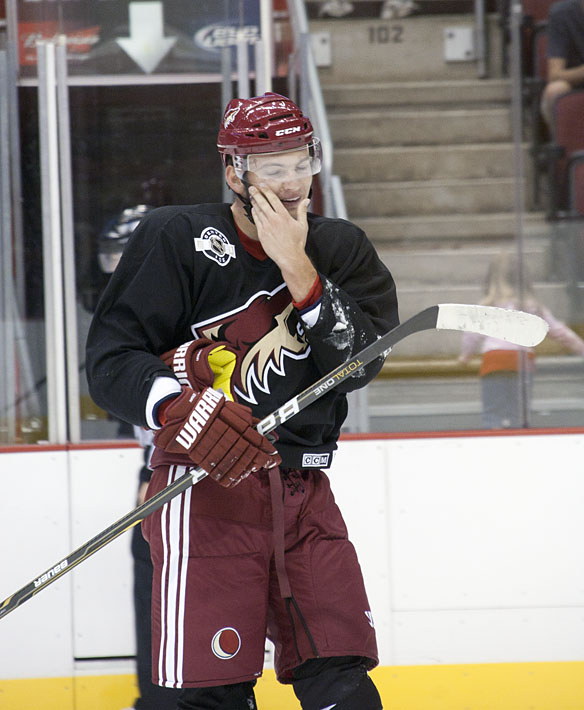
Drafted in 2005, Martin Hanzal was with the team from 2007 to 2017.

Another moment in a series of bad luck: the Coyotes were planning to host the 2006 NHL All-Star Game, but the event was canceled because of the 2006 Winter Olympics. The team returned to Winnipeg on September 17, 2006, to play a preseason game against the Edmonton Oilers, but were shut-out 5–0 before a sellout crowd of 15,015.

On April 11, 2007, chief executive officer Jeff Shumway announced that General Manager Michael Barnett (Gretzky's agent for over 20 years), senior executive vice president of hockey operations Cliff Fletcher and San Antonio Rampage's general manager and Coyotes' assistant general manager Laurence Gilman "have been relieved of their duties". The Coyotes finished the 2006–07 season 31–46–5, their worst record since relocating to Phoenix. On May 29, Jeff Shumway announced Don Maloney had agreed to a multi-year contract to become general manager of the Coyotes. As per club policy, the terms of the contract were not disclosed. However, as had been the case with all general managers since 2001, Maloney served in an advisory role to Gretzky.

The 2007–08 season was something of a resurgence for the Coyotes. After their disastrous 2006–07 campaign, the Coyotes looked to rebuild the team by relying on their drafted talent such as Peter Mueller and Martin Hanzal to make the team successful as opposed to using free agency. The Coyotes also acquired Radim Vrbata from the Chicago Blackhawks for Kevyn Adams in an effort to provide the team with more offense. The team signed both Alex Auld and David Aebischer to compete for the starting goaltender position with Mikael Tellqvist acting as the backup goaltender. Neither Auld or Aebischer were able to hold on to the starting position, leaving the Coyotes to turn to the waiver wire for assistance. On November 17, 2007, the Coyotes were able to claim Ilya Bryzgalov off waivers from the Anaheim Ducks. Bryzgalov responded by not only starting in goal the day he was acquired but posting a shutout in his Coyotes debut against the Los Angeles Kings. Bryzgalov was soon given a three-year contract extension because of his high level of play. Despite predictions of another disastrous season, the Coyotes played competitive hockey for most of the season. However, they finished eight points short of the last playoff spot, with 83 points.

=== Return to the playoffs and division title (2009–2012) ===
On September 24, 2009, Dave Tippett took over coaching duties of the Phoenix Coyotes after Wayne Gretzky stepped down hours before. In just 61 games, Tippett led the Coyotes to more wins in their 2009–10 regular season (37) than their previous season (36), en route to the first 50-win season in the franchise's NHL history.

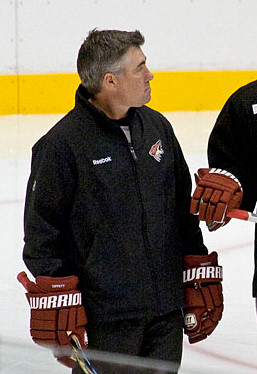
Named head coach in September 2009, Dave Tippett led the Coyotes to their first division championship and three consecutive playoffs. Tippett left the Coyotes in 2017.

On March 27, 2010, the Coyotes clinched a playoff spot, their first playoff spot since the 2001–02 season, and in the process, reached the 100-point mark for the first time ever as an NHL team, and the first time overall since the 1977–78 (WHA) Jets scored 102 points. They finished with 107 points, the highest point total in the franchise's 38-year history. This was good enough for fourth overall in the NHL, tying the 1984–85 Jets for the franchise's highest finish as an NHL team. They also qualified for the fourth seed in the Western Conference, giving them a home-ice advantage in the first round for the first time since 1999.

Their first round opponent in the 2010 Stanley Cup playoffs were the Detroit Red Wings. Game 1 of the series was the first NHL playoff game to be played in Gila River Arena. However, an injury to Shane Doan sidelined him for most of the series, and the defending conference champion Red Wings defeated the Coyotes in seven games.

The Coyotes again faced Detroit in the first round of the 2011 playoffs, losing the series in four games.

On April 7, 2012, the Coyotes defeated the Minnesota Wild 4–1 to win the Pacific Division title – their first and only division title as an NHL team (in Winnipeg or Phoenix). This gave them the third seed in the West, and with it home-ice advantage in a playoff series for only the third time in franchise history. In the first round, they defeated the Chicago Blackhawks in six games, the franchise's first playoff series win since 1987. The first five games went to overtime, tying a record when the Montreal Canadiens and Toronto Maple Leafs did it in the 1951 Stanley Cup Final. They faced the Nashville Predators in the second round, winning the first two games and the series 4–1. However, in the conference finals, the Coyotes fell to the Los Angeles Kings (who eventually went on to win the Cup that year) in game five of a 4–1 series.

==== 2009 bankruptcy and attempts to sell the team ====
In December 2008, the media became aware the Coyotes were suffering massive losses and that the NHL was paying the team's bills. The media reports were minimized by NHL commissioner Gary Bettman and vice president Bill Daly. However, Moyes had secretly given operational control of the team to the league. In May 2009, Moyes put the team into bankruptcy hours before Bettman was to present him an offer to sell the team to Chicago Bulls and Chicago White Sox owner Jerry Reinsdorf. Moyes intended to sell the team to Canadian billionaire Jim Balsillie, who in turn intended to purchase the team out of bankruptcy and move it to Hamilton, Ontario. The NHL responded by stripping Moyes of his remaining ownership authority.

From May until September 2009, hearings were held in Phoenix bankruptcy court to determine the fate of the Coyotes and the holding company. Two potential bidders for the team surfaced, Reinsdorf and Ice Edge Holdings, but they did not submit a bid for the team. Instead, the NHL put in the only rival bid to Balsillie for the team, while it contended the Moyes–Balsillie deal violated NHL rules. The bankruptcy court voided the planned sale to Balsillie, accepting the NHL's argument that bankruptcy could not be used to circumvent NHL rules. The NHL's bid was also declared insufficient, but the judge left the window open to an improved bid. Moyes and the NHL settled, with the NHL purchasing the team and assuming all debts. The NHL negotiated a temporary lease with the City of Glendale, which owns Gila River Arena.

The NHL then negotiated with Reinsdorf and Ice Edge toward a deal with Glendale. Ice Edge signed a letter of intent to purchase the team from the NHL, while Reinsdorf had won the approval of the City of Glendale. On May 7, 2010, ESPN.com reported the Reinsdorf bid had fallen apart and that the City of Glendale was working with Ice Edge to purchase the team in a last-ditch effort to keep them in Arizona. The National Post criticized both bids, as they were conditional on municipal taxpayers covering any losses the Coyotes might incur, and suggested that keeping the team in Phoenix was never economically viable.

In July 2010, the Ice Edge bid collapsed because it did not satisfy Glendale's financial conditions. Ice Edge decided to concentrate on an effort to purchase a minor league team. The City of Glendale had to step in and guarantee the team's losses for 2010–11 as a precondition of the NHL not transferring the franchise. A consortium of investors led by Chicago investor Matt Hulsizer then reached a deal to purchase the Coyotes from the NHL along with a lease agreement with Glendale. However, the Hulsizer deal collapsed in late June 2011 at least in part because of a threatened suit by the Goldwater Institute over the legality of payments that Glendale was to make to Hulsizer before the consortium bought the team. The threat of the suit may have prevented the sale of bonds to finance the payments. The team only stayed in the Phoenix area for the 2011–12 season after another $25 million payment by the City of Glendale.

Also in 2011, former Coyotes bidders True North Sports and Entertainment purchased the Atlanta Thrashers and moved them to Winnipeg, thus ending any possibility that the Coyotes would return to Manitoba. As part of the transaction, the NHL agreed to transfer the Jets' name, logos, and related trademarks from the league-owned Coyotes to True North and the Thrashers thus becoming the "new" Winnipeg Jets. However, the original Jets' history remained with the Coyotes organization.

The 2012–13 NHL lockout provided another opportunity for the Coyotes to find a potential owner and avoid relocation while the NHL suspended team operations during the labor dispute. A deal to former San Jose Sharks owner Greg Jamison had been drafted just as the lockout ended, but failed to be finalized and fulfilled by January 31, 2013. The deal would have kept the Coyotes in Phoenix for the next 20 years relying on a taxpayer subsidy, according to the agreement. It would also have had "Phoenix" dropped from the name and instead used "Arizona".

California investment executive Darin Pastor also submitted a bid to purchase the Coyotes. His bid proposed to keep the team in the Glendale area while engaging young hockey players in the region through school partnerships and scholarship efforts. The NHL rejected Pastor's bid on May 13, 2013, citing the bid was "inconsistent with what we had previously indicated were the minimum prerequisites" of a bid.

=== New ownership and the Arizona Coyotes (2013–2024) ===
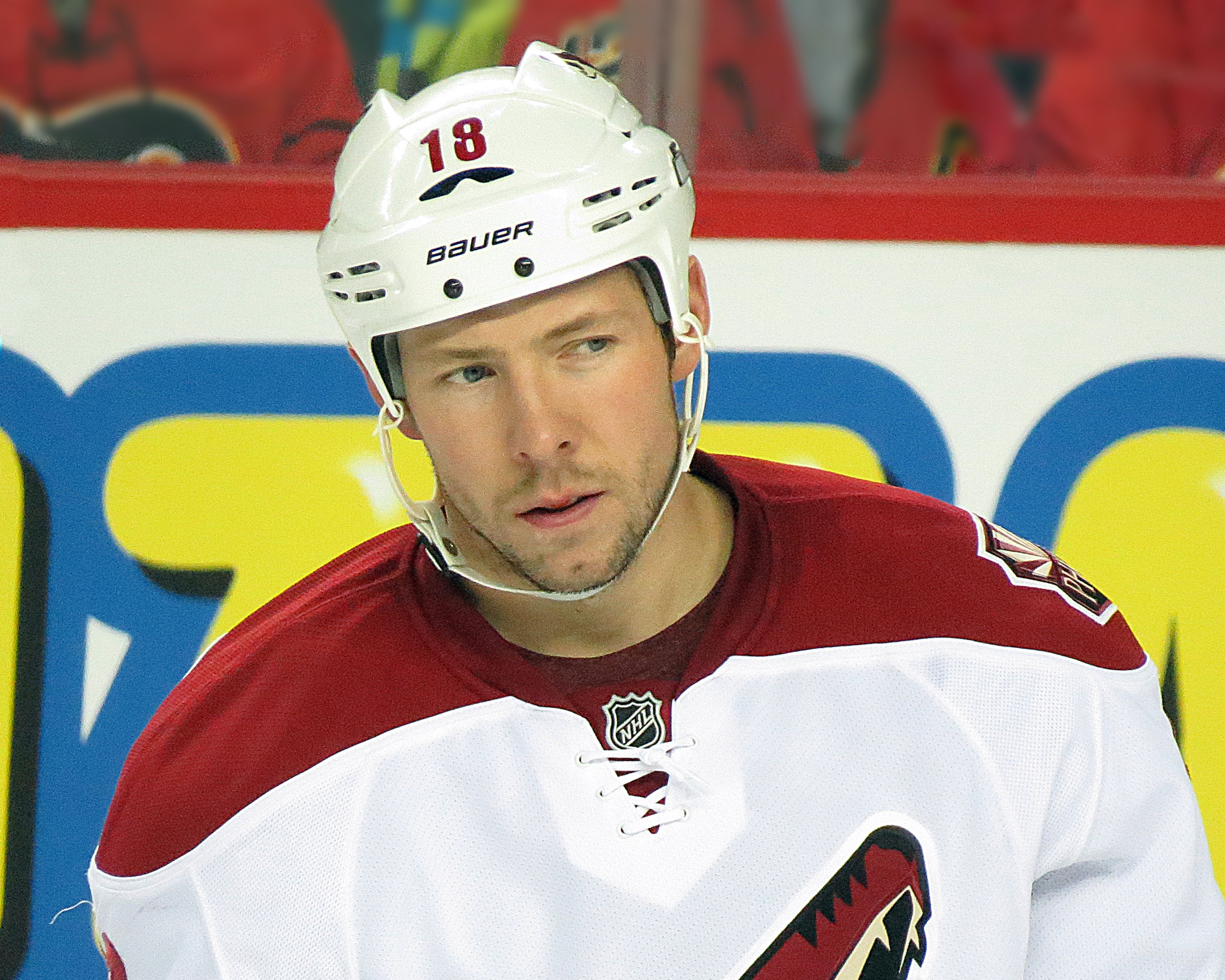
David Moss during the 2013–14 season. He scored the club's final goal under the Phoenix moniker on April 13, 2014. The club was renamed the Arizona Coyotes the next season.

Because the team had been in bankruptcy since 2009 and lost revenue each year, the NHL planned to move the Coyotes should a deal with the city for a new lease and new ownership not be decided by July 2, 2013. The plan was to move the franchise to a new city, likely Seattle. On July 2, 2013, by a vote of 4–3, the Glendale City Council approved a 15-year lease agreement with Renaissance Sports and Entertainment (RSE), which purchased the team from the NHL for US$225 million by August 5, 2013. The members of the Canadian group were executive chairman and governor George Gosbee; president, chief executive officer and alternate governor Anthony LeBlanc; alternate governor Craig Stewart; and directors Gary J. Drummond, W. David Duckett, William "Bill" Dutton, Robert Gwin, Scott Saxberg and Richard Walter. RSE partnered with Global Spectrum (owners of the Philadelphia Flyers) for help in managing Gila River Arena. The agreement had the City of Glendale giving RSE US$15 million per year for management fees. There was a clause stipulating RSE could relocate the team after five years if it accrued US$50 million in losses.

On January 29, 2014, the new ownership group announced that the team would change its name to the "Arizona Coyotes" for the 2014–15 season. According to Coyotes club president Anthony LeBlanc, the change was made to reflect the fact the team is no longer located within Phoenix city limits and to include all hockey fans in the state of Arizona. Aside from a new shoulder patch, the team's uniform design did not change. The name officially changed on June 27.

Following the conclusion of the 2013–14 season, it was reported that lackluster revenue from parking and non-hockey events enabled the City of Glendale to recoup just $4.4 million, which was significantly less than the $6.8 million the city expected to receive back from sources including parking receipts, ticket sales, and naming rights for the arena.

On June 4, 2014, it was reported that a Scottsdale, Arizona, public-relations firm had sued IceArizona, the owner of the Phoenix Coyotes, alleging the NHL club had reneged on a sponsorship deal worth nearly $250,000. A Coyotes spokesman responded to this issue by calling it a "quarter-million-dollar scheme". By October, IceArizona entered a deal to sell a 51% controlling interest in the Coyotes to Philadelphia-based hedge fund manager Andrew Barroway, who had recently failed in his attempt to purchase the New York Islanders. The deal was approved by the NHL Board of Governors on December 31, 2014.

During the 2014–15 season, the team finished last in the Pacific Division with the second-worst record in the NHL. On June 10, 2015, Glendale City Council voted to terminate its 15-year, $225 million agreement with the Coyotes. The city claimed "It was entitled to terminate the agreement because two former city employees, Craig Tindall and Julie Frisoni, were involved in securing the deal and later worked for the Coyotes." On July 23, 2015, it was announced the Coyotes and City Council had agreed on a resolution. On July 24, 2015, the Coyotes announced the City Council had reached a two-year deal.

At the conclusion of the 2015–16 season, general manager Don Maloney, who had won General Manager of the Year award in 2010, was fired from his position after eight seasons. The Coyotes replaced Maloney with John Chayka, who, at 26 years of age, became the youngest NHL general manager of all time, being promoted from his position as assistant general manager/analytics within the Coyotes staff. In August 2016, Dawn Braid was hired as the Coyotes' skating coach, making her the first female full-time coach in the NHL.

On November 14, 2016, the Coyotes announced plans to build a new arena in Tempe, Arizona, which was scheduled to be completed for the 2019–20 NHL season. The project would have included an adjoining 4,000-seat arena to be used for Coyotes practices and as the home for the Arizona State University hockey team. However, the arena project was withdrawn when ASU pulled out of the deal in February 2017.

At the end of the 2016–17 season, Barroway bought out the rest of the IceArizona ownership group and became the sole owner of the franchise. Following the transfer, former IceArizona chief executive officer Anthony LeBlanc and the director of hockey operations Gary Drummond both left the organization. On June 19, 2017, the Coyotes opted not to re-sign long-time captain Shane Doan, who had been with the franchise since they were the Winnipeg Jets. The Coyotes left Doan a standing offer to remain with the team in a non-playing role. On June 22, 2017, head coach Dave Tippett left his positions within the Coyotes after eight seasons, and was succeeded by Rick Tocchet on July 11, 2017.

On December 4, 2018, it was announced that the team would move to the Central Division in 2021, changing divisions for the second time since relocating to Arizona, as part of a league realignment following the addition of the Seattle Kraken. The team previously played in the Central Division for their first two seasons following their relocation from Winnipeg in 1996. On December 20, 2018, the team extended their lease in Gila River Arena through the 2019–20 season.

On July 29, 2019, Barroway sold controlling interest in the Coyotes to billionaire Alex Meruelo, with Barroway remaining as a minority owner until his arrest, which left Meruelo the sole owner of the franchise.

During the 2020 NHL entry draft, the Coyotes received widespread backlash and criticism for drafting Mitchell Miller in the fourth round (111th pick overall), after allegations surfaced that he had bullied and discriminated against an African-American classmate having a learning disability, during high school in 2016. Soon thereafter, they renounced his draft rights.

For the COVID-19 pandemic-shortened 2020–21 season the Coyotes were placed in the reformed West Division and played a division-only 56-game schedule. They finished in fifth place with 54 points, outside of the playoffs. After the season, the team and coach Rick Tocchet mutually agreed to part ways. Andre Tourigny was hired as head coach of the Coyotes on July 1, 2021.

Discussion with Andre Tourigny shortly after he was named coach of the Coyotes in 2021

For the 2021–22 season, the Coyotes moved into the Central Division upon the arrival of the Kraken in the Pacific Division. In the 2021 NHL entry draft, the Coyotes would select Josh Doan, son of former Coyotes player Shane Doan; Josh would later play with the Coyotes in 2024. On August 19, 2021, the city of Glendale and the Gila River Arena chose to not renew their operating agreement with the Coyotes beyond the 2021–22 season, as the team's lease had been renewed each year since 2016. The franchise entered negotiations with Tempe to develop a new arena on an old solid waste compost yard, but the terrain had problems regarding environmental remediation. On September 3, they submitted a proposal to build a new arena in Tempe.

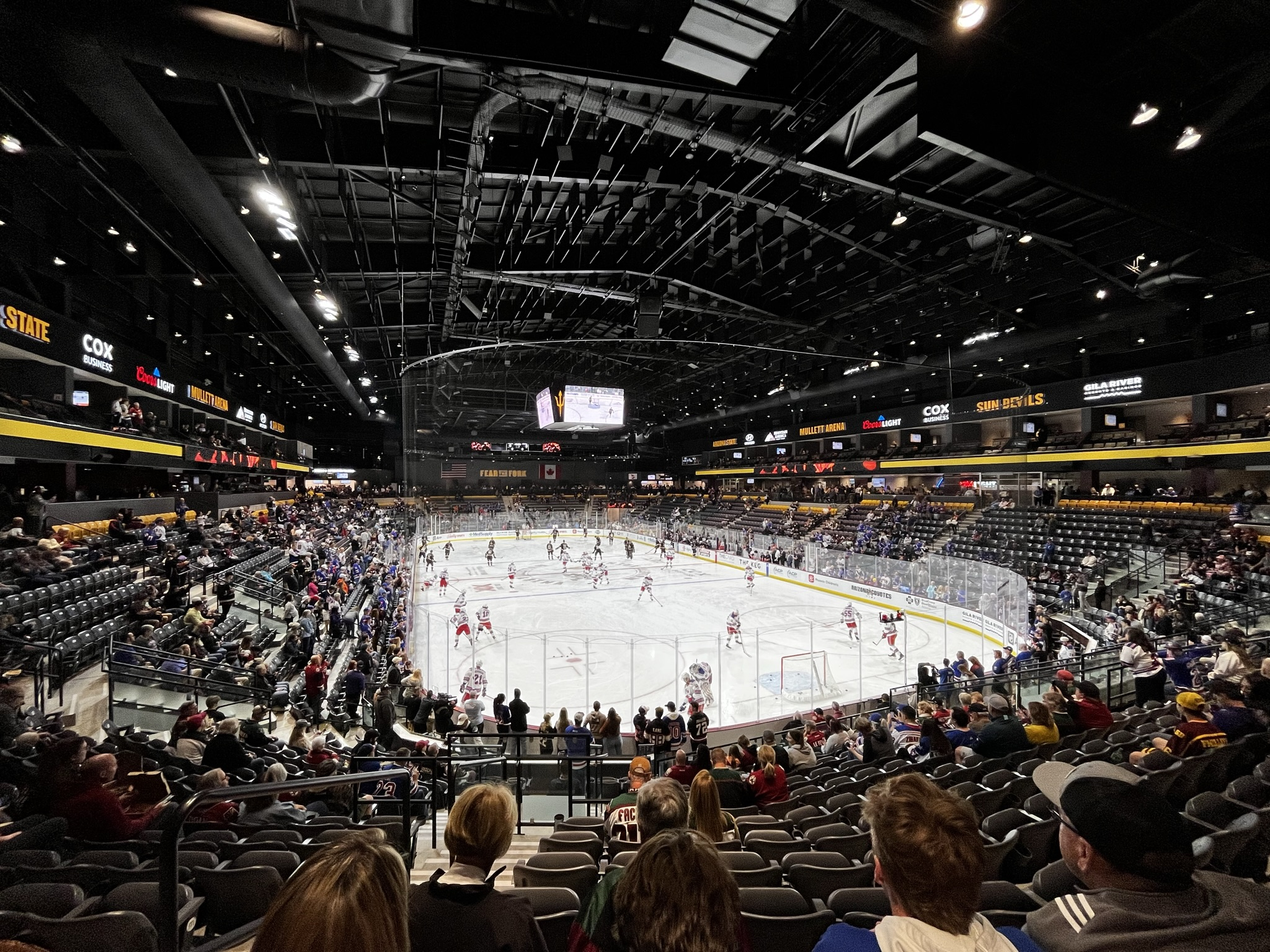
Coyotes and the New York Rangers warm up prior to a game at Mullett Arena, October 2022

On December 8, 2021, the Coyotes were informed that they would be locked out of Gila River Arena on December 20, 2021, if they did not pay $1.3 million owed in taxes, including $250,000 to the City of Glendale. The team paid the bills the next day, citing "unfortunate human error" as the cause of the issue. In late January 2022, the Coyotes were in talks with Arizona State University (ASU) to use their new 5,000-seat arena as a temporary home arena for the next few years. On February 10, 2022, the Coyotes signed a three-year agreement to play their games at Mullett Arena, starting with the 2022–23 season. On April 29, 2022, the Coyotes played their final home game at the Gila River Arena against the Nashville Predators, with a 5–4 comeback win. On October 28, 2022, the Coyotes would make their debut in the Mullett Arena, which sold out to a crowd of 4,600 people that day, in a 3–2 overtime loss to the current Winnipeg Jets franchise, with Christian Fischer scoring the first two goals of the franchise at the arena for that game.

==== Asset transfer to Utah and suspension of operations ====
A proposal by the Coyotes to build a new arena in Tempe was rejected by residents of the city on May 16, 2023. The arena was estimated to cost $2.1 billion, with $1.9 billion of the cost privately funded. Despite speculation on immediate relocation, the team remained in Arizona, playing at Mullett Arena during the 2023–24 NHL season. The Coyotes spoke with the city of Mesa about a potential arena at the Fiesta Mall site, but that plan was ultimately rejected for unknown reasons. In January 2024, Scottsdale mayor David Ortega announced his opposition to a Coyotes' proposal for an arena in northern Phoenix near the border of Scottsdale. Following this, the Coyotes initially stated on social media their commitment to keeping the team in Arizona. They announced that the ownership was intent on winning a land auction for 110 acres (45 ha) of state-owned land between Scottsdale Road and Loop 101 in Phoenix to build an arena. However, the auction had been delayed from January to June 2024, which likely played a part into the ownership's final decision with the franchise near the end of the 2023–24 season.

On April 10, 2024, it was reported that, with the NHL's permission, the Coyotes were making efforts to relocate to Salt Lake City, following concerns about an indefinite timeframe for finding a new arena and the effects of continued play at Mullett Arena, in the interim. This led to the NHL buying the franchise then reselling it to Ryan Smith, owner of the Utah Jazz of the National Basketball Association (NBA), for a reported $1.2 billion. Of that payment, $1 billion went to Coyotes owner Alex Meruelo for the sale (with Meruelo agreeing to refund the money to the NHL as an expansion fee should his efforts to locate a new home for the franchise succeed) and $200 million went to the NHL's other 31 owners, as the equivalent of a relocation fee. The Utah team plays its home games at the Jazz's home arena, the Delta Center. Renovations were required to make it the team's permanent home, similar to the renovations made to Climate Pledge Arena before the Kraken began play in the NHL two seasons prior.

On April 12, 2024, ahead of a 3–2 overtime win against the Edmonton Oilers at Rogers Place, general manager Bill Armstrong officially disclosed the news of the team's impending sale and relocation to Coyotes players and staff. Five days later, on April 17, the Coyotes played their final game at Mullett Arena, and ultimately their last game before deactivation, against the same Oilers team. With the fans engaging in one last Whiteout (and audibly heard chanting phrases such as "Salt Lake sucks" and "we love you Coyotes" throughout the game), the Coyotes won 5–2, with Sean Durzi scoring the final goal of the team's first incarnation, into an empty net. Amongst the events of the game, Shane Doan was given his retirement banner (which had been lost by the team in the move to Mullett Arena but had been rediscovered by a local fan), and following the end of the game the fans gave the outgoing team a standing ovation, and the players, in turn, spent over an hour afterward on the ice giving away team apparel and equipment (also signing a majority of the fan gifts), as well as taking a final team picture on the ice and taking turns hugging and thanking longtime equipment manager Stan Wilson, who had moved with the team from Winnipeg in 1996. The following day, the sale and relocation was officially approved, and the team was officially deactivated until further notice.

It subsequently emerged that the Utah club was considered an expansion team, not a relocated Coyotes team. In a deal that effectively split the Coyotes franchise in half, Smith acquired the Coyotes' player contracts, hockey operations staff, and draft picks while the Coyotes went "dormant" pending a permanent arena. This move was similar to the Cleveland Browns and Baltimore Ravens of the National Football League (NFL), with the Coyotes continuing minor business operations, mostly focused on finding a new arena. Meruelo remained on the NHL Board of Governors as an observer, retaining the rights to the Coyotes brand and history (including the history and records of the 1972–1996 Winnipeg Jets), with a five-year window to build or otherwise locate a new arena for his team, before "reactivating" the Coyotes through an expansion draft. Conversely, if Meruelo were to fail to come up with a suitable arena by end of that five-year window, he would be required to permanently halt franchise operations and cede the franchise back to the NHL. The sale was finalized on April 18, after the NHL Board of Governors voted to grant a new Utah franchise to Smith, effectively expanding the NHL to a total of 33 clubs, if the Coyotes succeeded in building a new team arena.

On June 21, 2024, the Arizona State Land Department canceled a land auction for a 110-acre parcel of land in north Phoenix which Meruelo intended to purchase as a site for a new arena. Three days later, it was reported that Meruelo had told staff he had no plans to pursue further arena options for the team. At the Board of Governors meeting on June 26, Meruelo informed Bettman that he was not pursuing the franchise reactivation. Meruelo formally relinquished his rights to the franchise as well as its intellectual property on July 10.

=== Committee to bring back the Coyotes ===
In 2025, an advisory panel was formed by Maricopa County Board of Supervisors Chair Tom Galvin with the aim of bringing an expansion team to the Phoenix area. In September of that year, Andrea Doan, the wife of former Coyotes captain Shane Doan, joined as the head of the committee. If successful, this team would also be known as the Arizona Coyotes, essentially serving as a reactivation of the franchise. The NHL has expressed interest in returning professional ice hockey to the Phoenix area with player polls also supporting a return. In June 2026, Bettman said that the NHL maintains interest in Phoenix, although they are further behind expansion than Houston or Austin. In August 2026, Jeff Marek said that the NHL would return to Phoenix through expansion at some point while Daly said that talks were still underway with Phoenix. In September 2026, Daly confirmed that there were two groups looking to receive an expansion team in Phoenix. On September 24, the NHL announced that the statistical history of the original Jets franchise would be moved from the inactive Coyotes franchise to the current Jets franchise. The records and statistics of the franchise now only include statistics from 1996–97 to 2023–24.

== Team information ==
=== Name ===
Upon the franchise's relocation to Phoenix, a public team-naming vote was held, with "Coyotes" defeating "Scorpions" among the finalists. Both coyotes and scorpions are inhabitants of the Sonoran Desert, and the owners/supporters of the club wanted the team name to be an animal that was representative of the region. On June 27, 2014, the team changed their geographic name to Arizona.

=== Logos and jerseys ===
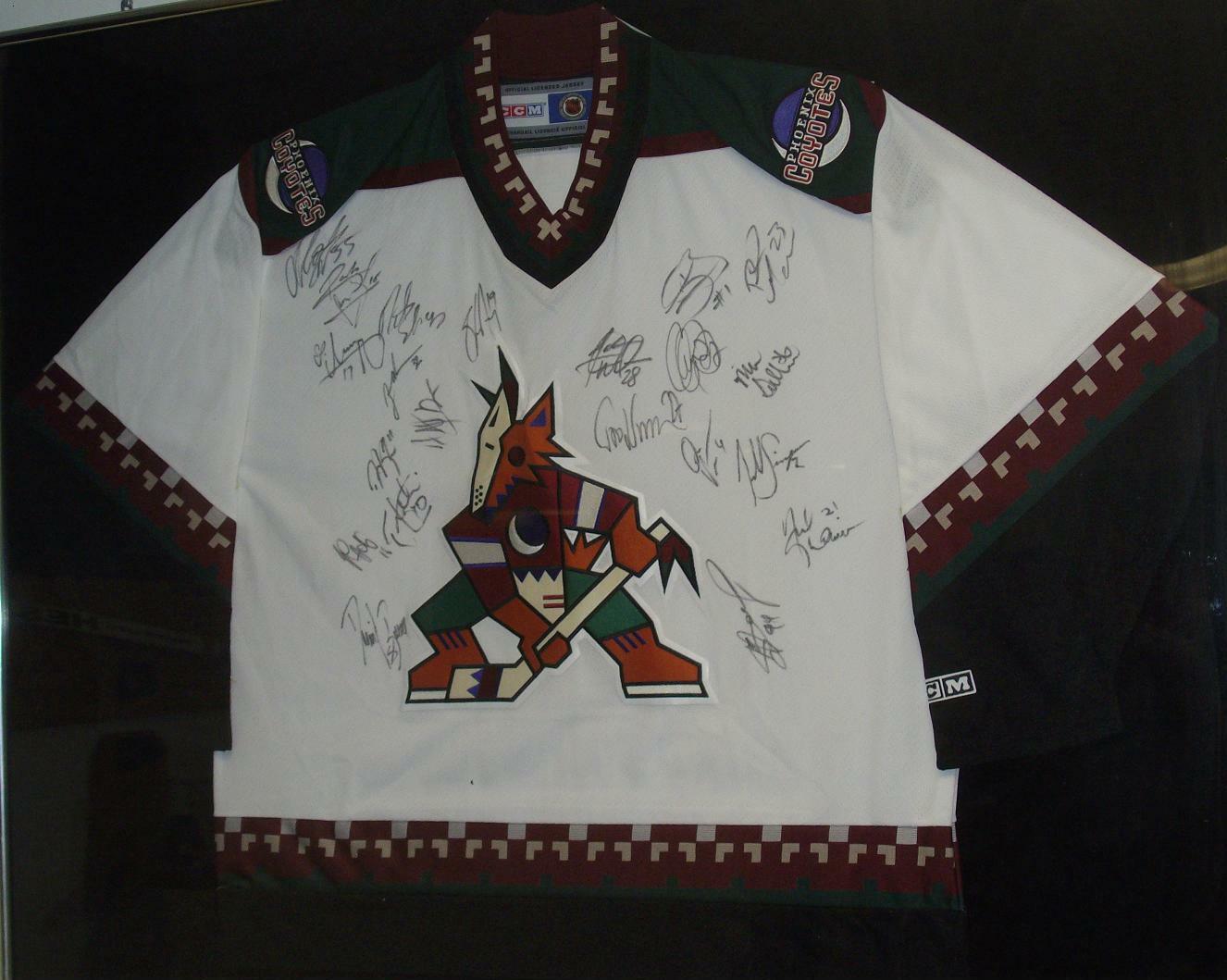
Coyotes jersey with the kachina-inspired logo used from 1996 to 2003.

Upon their arrival in Phoenix in 1996, the team adopted a look with a traditional Southwestern design. The primary logo was a Southwest Native American-styled coyote playing hockey in a kachina-inspired style. The jerseys featured pointed green shoulders with brick red trim over a white (home) or black (road) body, and non-traditional striping patterns. These uniforms remained in place until 2003. A third jersey, primarily green with a nighttime desert landscape wrapped around the bottom and the cuffs of the sleeves, was introduced in 1998 and was retired in 2003 when the team redesigned the uniforms.

As the NHL switched home and road jerseys beginning in the 2003–04 season and coinciding with the team's move from America West Arena to the newly completed Glendale Arena, the Coyotes redesigned their look completely, adopting a howling coyote head logo while dropping several colors from the team's palette. Sedona red and white became the primary colors, with desert sand and black remaining as logo trim colors. A variation of these colors was later used for Major League Baseball team Arizona Diamondbacks. The team also changed its shoulder patch, taking the form of the outline of the state of Arizona, with an homage to the state flag and the abbreviation "PHX". This logo was worn only on the right shoulder leaving the left shoulder bare.

The Coyotes' primary logo, used from 2003 to 2021.

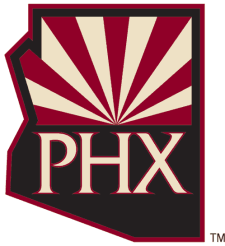
The Coyotes's shoulder patch, used from 2003 to 2014.

The Coyotes updated their jerseys for the 2007–08 season, along with all NHL teams, as part of the switchover to "Rbk Edge" jerseys. The changes made were adding an NHL crest just below the neck opening, removing the stripes that were previously just above the lower hem, and moving the "PHX" patch from the right to the left shoulder. The white jersey also gained red shoulder coloring and laces at the collar. The three-stripe pattern is applied to the side of the pants.

The Coyotes also added a third jersey for the 2008–09 season. It is primarily black and features a new alternate coyote logo on the front, with the primary logo (coyote head) patch on the right shoulder, and the "Official Seal" on the left. Since white does not appear on the alternate, solid red pant shells are worn with this jersey.

Before the 2014–15 season, it was announced the Coyotes' third jersey would no longer be used. The patch on the home and away jerseys that used to read "PHX" would also be changed to read "AZ" to match the team's rebranded name.

On June 26, 2015, the Coyotes introduced updated jerseys. The uniforms reintegrated black into the design; the color was prominently featured on the uniform sleeves, socks, and pants.

The Coyotes wore their black Kachina jerseys for a few dates between 2014–15 and 2016–17 seasons. The style was similar to the originals but was adapted to the Reebok Edge cut. For the 2018–19 season and beyond, the Coyotes revived the Kachina uniforms as a third jersey, and was updated to the Adidas adizero cut. In 2020, the black Kachina design became the primary home jerseys (for 2021 only, the red trim on the letters were changed to silver to commemorate the team's 25th season in Arizona), but kept the previous red "howling coyote" jerseys as an alternate. The road "howling coyote" jerseys were also retained. In addition, the Coyotes wore a second alternate uniform: a purple "Reverse Retro" version of the 1998–2003 Kachina head alternates.

Before the 2021–22 season, the Coyotes hinted at a possible rebrand in September after the team named MullenLowe LA as its branding partner. During the off-season, the Coyotes quietly brought back the 1996–2003 Kachina logo as the primary, and later revealed a white road version of the Kachina uniforms while keeping the previous "howling coyote" home uniform as an alternate.

In the 2022–23 season, Arizona once again wore its 1998–2003 Kachina head alternates as its "Reverse Retro" uniform, but with sienna as the base color. Also during that season, a new alternate uniform was released, returning to the simplified brick red and sand color scheme from 2003 to 2015 but with kachina patterns at the bottom and on the sleeves. The uniform features "Arizona" in sand with a star above the "i", and a sand saguaro on the right side of the pants. The captain's patch is denoted by the crescent moon alternate, while the alternate captain's patch is denoted by two saguaros crossing each other.

=== Mascot ===
Howler has been the coyote-suited mascot of the Arizona Coyotes. He was introduced on October 15, 2005. The Coyotes' official kids club was called Howler's Kids Club. Howler wears number 96 on his jersey, representing the year the Winnipeg Jets moved to Arizona, and he also wore an "M" designation for "mascot". He has also been known to beat on a bucket to encourage the fans to cheer and has had many different outfits in games.

== Season-by-season record ==
This is a partial list of the last five seasons completed by the Coyotes. For the full season-by-season history, see List of Arizona Coyotes seasons.

Note: GP = Games played, W = Wins, L = Losses, OTL = Overtime Losses, Pts = Points, GF = Goals for, GA = Goals against

Season-by-season records for the Arizona Coyotes
Season	GP	W	L	OTL	Pts	GF	GA	Finish	Playoffs
2019–20	70	33	29	8	74	195	187	5th, Pacific	Lost in first round, 1–4 (Avalanche)
2020–21	56	24	26	6	54	153	176	5th, West	Did not qualify
2021–22	82	25	50	7	57	207	313	8th, Central	Did not qualify
2022–23	82	28	40	14	70	229	299	7th, Central	Did not qualify
2023–24	82	36	41	5	77	256	274	7th, Central	Did not qualify

== Players ==
=== Retired and honored numbers ===
Arizona Coyotes retired numbers
No.	Player	Position	Career	Date retired
19 (Note: Doan played his first season with the original iteration of the Winnipeg Jets and spent most of his time with the team under the Phoenix Coyotes moniker before playing his final three seasons with the team under the Arizona Coyotes name. He would ultimately play his entire professional career with the original Jets/Coyotes franchise.) (Note: Shane Doan's #19 was officially retired on February 24, 2019, making his number the first (and only one before the 2024 suspension) to be officially retired by the Arizona franchise, with a banner originally hanging in the Gila River Arena until the Coyotes left the arena and moved to the Mullett Arena. The banner would later be given to Shane Doan himself after the team's final game played in 2024. Doan's Coyotes banner is currently held at the Ice Den in Scottsdale, Arizona until a new Coyotes' team arrives to display it.)	Shane Doan	RW	1996–2017	February 24, 2019

Arizona Coyotes Ring of Honor
No.	Player	Position	Career	Date honored
7 (Note: Previously played for the original iteration of the Winnipeg Jets before the team moved to Phoenix, Arizona to become the Phoenix Coyotes.)	Keith Tkachuk	LW	1992–2001	December 23, 2011
9 (Note: Bobby Hull's #9 was unretired briefly upon his request at the beginning of the 2005–06 season for his son, Brett before he retired five games into the season.) (Note: Hull and Steen only played for the original Winnipeg Jets and had their numbers retired when the team played in Winnipeg. The Coyotes continued to honor these numbers in the Ring of Honor up until the Coyotes would play their final game in 2024. If the Coyotes franchise somehow gets reactivated by 2029, the numbers will continue to be honored by the team properly.)	Bobby Hull	LW	1972–1980	October 8, 2005
10 (Note: Hawerchuk played only for the original Winnipeg Jets, but he had his number honored while the franchise represented Phoenix, Arizona after the initial relocation. The Coyotes continued to honor these numbers in the Ring of Honor up until the Coyotes would play their final game in 2024. If the Coyotes franchise somehow gets reactivated by 2029, the numbers will continue to be honored by the team properly.)	Dale Hawerchuk	C	1981–1990	April 5, 2007
25	Thomas Steen	C	1981–1995	January 21, 2006
27	Teppo Numminen	D	1988–2003	January 30, 2010
49 (Note: Leighton Accardo never played for the franchise, but was a member of the Arizona Kachinas youth hockey program, a fan of the Coyotes, and signed a one-day contract with the team in 2019 before she died at nine years old from cancer on November 24, 2020. Her youth hockey number of 49 was placed into the Ring of Honor and the Coyotes wore an "LA49" decal on their helmets throughout the 2020–21 season.)	Leighton Accardo	Fan	—	April 17, 2021
97 (Note: Jeremy Roenick would spend both of his stints with the team while they were the Phoenix Coyotes.)	Jeremy Roenick	C	1996–2001; 2006–2007	February 9, 2012
99 (Note: Gretzky never played for the franchise, though he was a part-owner and coach for the Coyotes. As such his number, which was retired league-wide since 2000, is on the Coyotes' Ring of Honor. The NHL had retired his number for all its member teams at the 2000 NHL All-Star Game.)	Wayne Gretzky	C	—	October 8, 2005

=== Hall of Famers ===
Players

- Mike Gartner
- Brett Hull
- Jeremy Roenick
- Keith Tkachuk

=== Team captains ===
In the NHL, each team may select a captain. Along with the two alternate captains, they have the "privilege of discussing with the referee any questions relating to interpretation of rules which may arise during the progress of a game". Captains are required to wear the letter "C" on their uniform for identification, which is 3 inches (7.6 cm) high.

- Keith Tkachuk, 1996–2001
- Teppo Numminen, 2001–2003
- Shane Doan, 2003–2017
- Oliver Ekman-Larsson, 2018–2021

=== First-round draft picks ===
- 1996: Dan Focht (11th overall), Daniel Briere (24th overall)
- 1998: Patrick DesRochers (14th overall)
- 1999: Scott Kelman (15th overall), Kirill Safronov (19th overall)
- 2000: Krystofer Kolanos (19th overall)
- 2001: Fredrik Sjöström (11th overall)
- 2002: Jakub Koreis (19th overall), Ben Eager (23rd overall)
- 2004: Blake Wheeler (5th overall)
- 2005: Martin Hanzal (17th overall)
- 2006: Peter Mueller (8th overall), Chris Summers (29th overall)
- 2007: Kyle Turris (3rd overall), Nick Ross (30th overall)
- 2008: Mikkel Bødker (8th overall), Viktor Tikhonov (28th overall)
- 2009: Oliver Ekman-Larsson (6th overall)
- 2010: Brandon Gormley (13th overall), Mark Visentin (27th overall)
- 2011: Connor Murphy (20th overall)
- 2012: Henrik Samuelsson (27th overall)
- 2013: Max Domi (12th overall)
- 2014: Brendan Perlini (12th overall)
- 2015: Dylan Strome (3rd overall), Nick Merkley (30th overall)
- 2016: Clayton Keller (7th overall), Jakob Chychrun (16th overall)
- 2017: Pierre-Olivier Joseph (23rd overall)
- 2018: Barrett Hayton (5th overall)
- 2019: Victor Söderström (11th overall)
- 2021: Dylan Guenther (9th overall)
- 2022: Logan Cooley (3rd overall), Conor Geekie (11th overall), Maveric Lamoureux (29th overall)
- 2023: Dmitriy Simashev (6th overall), Daniil But (12th overall)

== Awards and trophies ==
Jack Adams Award

- Bob Francis: 2001–02
- Dave Tippett: 2009–10

King Clancy Memorial Trophy

- Shane Doan: 2009–10

Mark Messier Leadership Award

- Shane Doan: 2011–12

Bill Masterton Memorial Trophy

- Connor Ingram: 2023–24

== Franchise records ==
=== Franchise scoring leaders ===
These are the top-ten-point-scorers in franchise (Phoenix and Arizona) history.

Note: Pos = Position; GP = Games played; G = Goals; A = Assists; Pts = Points; P/G = Points per game

Points
Player	Pos	GP	G	A	Pts	P/G
Shane Doan	RW	1,466	395	560	955	.65
Clayton Keller	LW	520	166	252	418	.80
Oliver Ekman-Larsson	D	769	128	260	388	.50
Jeremy Roenick	C	454	152	227	379	.83
Radim Vrbata	RW	509	157	186	343	.67
Keith Tkachuk	LW	332	179	155	334	1.01
Martin Hanzal	C	608	117	196	313	.51
Keith Yandle	D	558	65	246	311	.56
Nick Schmaltz	C	344	93	176	269	.78
Teppo Numminen	D	551	55	214	269	.49

Goals
Player	Pos	G
Shane Doan	RW	395
Keith Tkachuk	LW	179
Clayton Keller	LW	166
Radim Vrbata	RW	157
Jeremy Roenick	C	152
Oliver Ekman-Larsson	D	128
Martin Hanzal	C	117
Lawson Crouse	LW	103
Nick Schmaltz	C	93
Ladislav Nagy	LW	92

Assists
Player	Pos	A
Shane Doan	RW	570
Oliver Ekman-Larsson	D	260
Clayton Keller	LW	252
Keith Yandle	D	246
Jeremy Roenick	C	227
Teppo Numminen	D	214
Martin Hanzal	C	196
Radim Vrbata	RW	186
Nick Schmaltz	C	176
Ladislav Nagy	LW	157

=== Franchise goaltending leaders ===
These goaltenders rank in the top ten in franchise (Phoenix and Arizona) history for wins.

Note: GP = Games played; W = Wins; L = Losses; T/O = Ties/Overtime losses; GA = Goal against; GAA = Goals against average; SA = Shots against; SV% = Save percentage; SO = Shutouts

Goaltenders
Player	GP	W	L	T/O	GA	GAA	SA	SV%	SO
Ilya Bryzgalov	257	130	93	27	639	2.54	7,701	.917	21
Mike Smith	312	128	132	41	807	2.69	9,570	.916	22
Sean Burke	211	97	78	29	491	2.39	6,045	.919	15
Nikolai Khabibulin	205	92	84	23	507	2.58	5,610	.910	19
Darcy Kuemper	121	55	48	15	289	2.43	3,607	.920	10
Curtis Joseph	115	50	52	5	325	3.04	3,171	.898	8
Antti Raanta	104	46	42	11	248	2.57	3,154	.921	5
Karel Vejmelka	140	44	75	11	452	3.50	4,428	.899	5
Connor Ingram	77	29	34	11	225	3.08	2,421	.907	7
Brian Boucher	96	28	45	18	269	2.98	2,628	.898	5

=== Team records ===
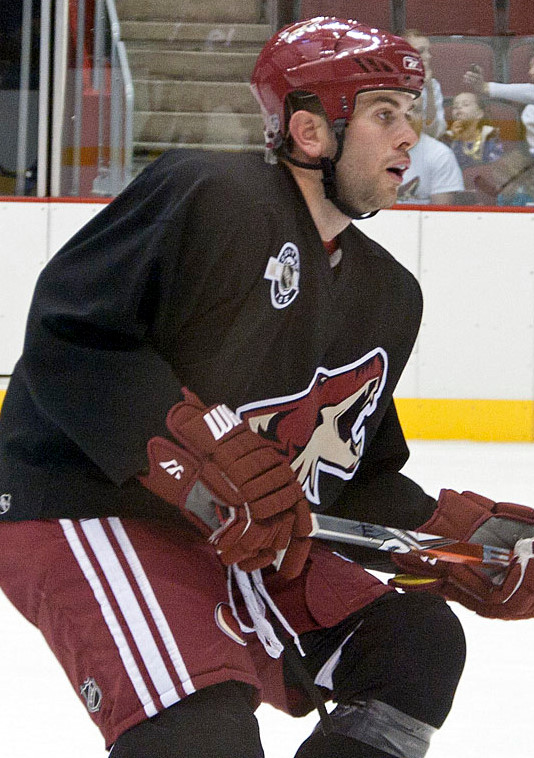
Keith Yandle set the franchise record for most points in a single season by a defenseman, recording 59 points in the 2010–11 season.

Note: This list does not include seasons of the 1972–1996 Winnipeg Jets.

- Most goals in a season: 52, Keith Tkachuk (1996–97)
- Most assists in a season: 53, Ray Whitney (2011–12)
- Most points in a season: 86, Keith Tkachuk (1996–97) and Clayton Keller (2022–23)
- Most penalty minutes in a season: 324, Daniel Carcillo (2007–08)
- Most goals in a season, defenseman: 23, Oliver Ekman-Larsson (2014–15)
- Most points in a season, defenseman: 59, Keith Yandle (2010–11)
- Most points in a season, rookie: 65, Clayton Keller (2017–18)
- Most wins in a season: 42, Ilya Bryzgalov (2009–10)

== Broadcasting ==
=== Television ===
Prior to the cessation of the team's operations, the following television stations carried the team's games:

- KASW (Independent, Phoenix)
- KGUN-DT2 (Laff, Tucson)
- KUPX-TV/KSTU-DT2 (Independent/Antenna TV, Provo–Salt Lake City)
  - As KUPX also aired Vegas Golden Knights games on their main channel, games were split between KUPX-TV and KSTU-DT2, depending on the latter's own game scheduling
  - KNXV-TV (Independent, Phoenix) would also be involved earlier in the team's final season of play, but would drop out in covering games live shortly after the season began.

From its move to Phoenix in 1996 to the end of the 2007–08 season, the regional television rights for Arizona Coyotes were split between Fox Sports Arizona and over-the-air broadcasters including KTVK and KASW (1996–2006) and KAZT-TV (2006–2008). From the 2007–08 NHL season until the 2023 NHL preseason period, Bally Sports Arizona (formerly Fox Sports Arizona) was the exclusive regional television rightsholder for all Arizona Coyotes games not broadcast nationally by NBCSN, NBC, ESPN, ABC, or TNT. As part of Bally Sports' bankruptcy proceedings, on October 4, 2023, Diamond Sports rejected Bally Sports Arizona's contract with the Coyotes. For the 2023–24 NHL season, Scripps Sports became the new exclusive regional television rightsholder for all Arizona Coyotes games not broadcast nationally.

On October 5, 2023, the Coyotes reached a new multi-year broadcast agreement with the E. W. Scripps Company, with games airing on Scripps-owned broadcast stations in the Coyotes' designated market. As part of the agreement, the Coyotes planned to launch a direct-to-consumer streaming service. In Phoenix, KNXV-TV's Antenna TV-affiliated subchannel 15.2 initially served as flagship station; due to network programming commitments with ABC and The CW, KNXV or sister station KASW could not carry the games on their main channels, but were still scheduled to air team-produced ancillary programming. On February 16, 2024, the Coyotes launched Coyotes Central, a direct-to-consumer streaming service that featured all locally televised games in partnership with Kiswe. At launch, the service cost $11.99 per month and $24.99 for the remainder of the 2023–24 season.

In November 2023, Scripps announced that KASW would become the independent station Arizona 61 on November 20, taking over as the flagship station of the Coyotes television network. The CW would concurrently move to KNXV-DT2. With the team's cessation in 2024, the Utah Mammoth would retain the Coyotes' relationship with Scripps, signing KASW's Salt Lake City sister station KUPX as its flagship. The NHL would assign the Coyotes' former broadcast territory to both the Vegas Golden Knights and Utah Mammoth—whose broadcast rights are both held by Scripps Sports; KASW has since primarily aired Mammoth games, with Golden Knights games (simulcast from sister station KMCC) airing when the schedule permits.

=== Radio ===
In 2021, the Arizona Coyotes entered a two-year deal with Bonneville Phoenix to broadcast the team's games on the radio in the Phoenix market on either KMVP-FM or KTAR. In 2023, the Arizona Coyotes extended the deal with Bonneville Phoenix by one-year.

- 98.7/KMVP-FM: Phoenix
- 620/KTAR: Phoenix (when there was a conflict on KMVP-FM)
- 92.3/KTAR-FM: Glendale (when there was a conflict on KTAR and KMVP-FM)

== See also ==
- Winnipeg Jets (1972–1996)
- List of Arizona Coyotes players
- List of Arizona Coyotes broadcasters
- Utah Mammoth
