= Peter Muller =

Peter or Pete Muller, Müller or Mueller may refer to:

== Sports ==
=== Association football (soccer) ===
- Peter Müller (footballer, born 1946), East German footballer
- Peter Müller (footballer, born 1948), West German footballer
- Peter Müller (footballer, born 1969), German footballer

=== Other sports ===
- Peter Müller (ice hockey) (1896–1974), Swiss ice hockey player
- Peter Müller (boxer) (1928–2013), Swiss boxer
- Peter Mueller (Canadian football) (born 1951), tight end for the Toronto Argonauts
- Peter Mueller (speed skater) (born 1954), American speed skater and speed skating coach
- Peter Müller (skier) (born 1957), Swiss alpine skier
- Peter Mueller (ice hockey) (born 1988), American ice hockey player

== Others ==
- Peter Erasmus Müller (1776–1834), Danish bishop
- Peter Muller (architect) (1927–2023), Australian architect
- Peter Müller (politician) (born 1955), German politician and judge
- Pete Muller (photographer) (born 1982), American news photographer
- Pete Muller (businessman and singer-songwriter), American musician and founder and CEO of PDT Partners
- Peter Müller (computer scientist) (born 1971), German & Swiss professor and computer scientist

== See also ==
- Johannes Peter Müller (1801–1858), German physiologist
- Peter Millar (disambiguation)
- Peter Miller (disambiguation)
- Peter Møller (born 1972), Danish football (soccer) player
- Pierre Muller (1952–2022), member of the government of Geneva, Switzerland
- Piotr Müller (1989-), Polish politician and lawyer
