= Utah Mammoth =

National Hockey League team in Salt Lake City, Utah

- 2026–27 Utah Mammoth season
- Conference: Western
- Division: Central
- Founded: 2024 (Note: The team was technically formed in 2024; in terms of the team's history, it was not considered a relocation of the Arizona Coyotes. Utah only received the existing personnel and picks, similar to the aftermath of the Cleveland Browns relocation controversy.)
- History: Utah Hockey Club; 2024–2025; Utah Mammoth; 2025–present
- Home arena: Delta Center
- City: Salt Lake City, Utah
- Team colors: Rock black, mountain blue, salt white
- Media: KUPX-TV; KZNS
- Owner: Ryan Smith
- General manager: Bill Armstrong
- Head coach: Andre Tourigny
- Captain: Clayton Keller
- Minor league affiliates: Tucson Roadrunners (AHL)
- Stanley Cups: 0
- Conference championships: 0
- Presidents' Trophies: 0
- Division championships: 0
- Official website: nhl.com/utah

The Utah Mammoth are a professional ice hockey team based in Salt Lake City. The Mammoth compete in the National Hockey League (NHL) as a member of the Central Division in the Western Conference. The franchise joined the league as an expansion team for the 2024–25 season. The team plays its home games at the Delta Center, an arena they share with the Utah Jazz of the National Basketball Association (NBA).

The team was created on April 18, 2024, with the NHL Board of Governors granting an expansion franchise to Jazz owner Ryan Smith. In lieu of an expansion draft to stock the new team, Smith acquired the hockey assets (players, coaching staff, and draft picks) of the Arizona Coyotes, which suspended hockey operations at the same time. The team played its inaugural season in 2024–25 with the temporary name Utah Hockey Club while a permanent name could be determined. The team's name, colors, and jerseys for their inaugural season were revealed on June 13, 2024. After playing a full season under the temporary name, a fan vote led to the permanent naming of Utah Mammoth, which was revealed on May 7, 2025.

== History ==
=== Background and establishment ===
==== History of ice hockey in Salt Lake City ====
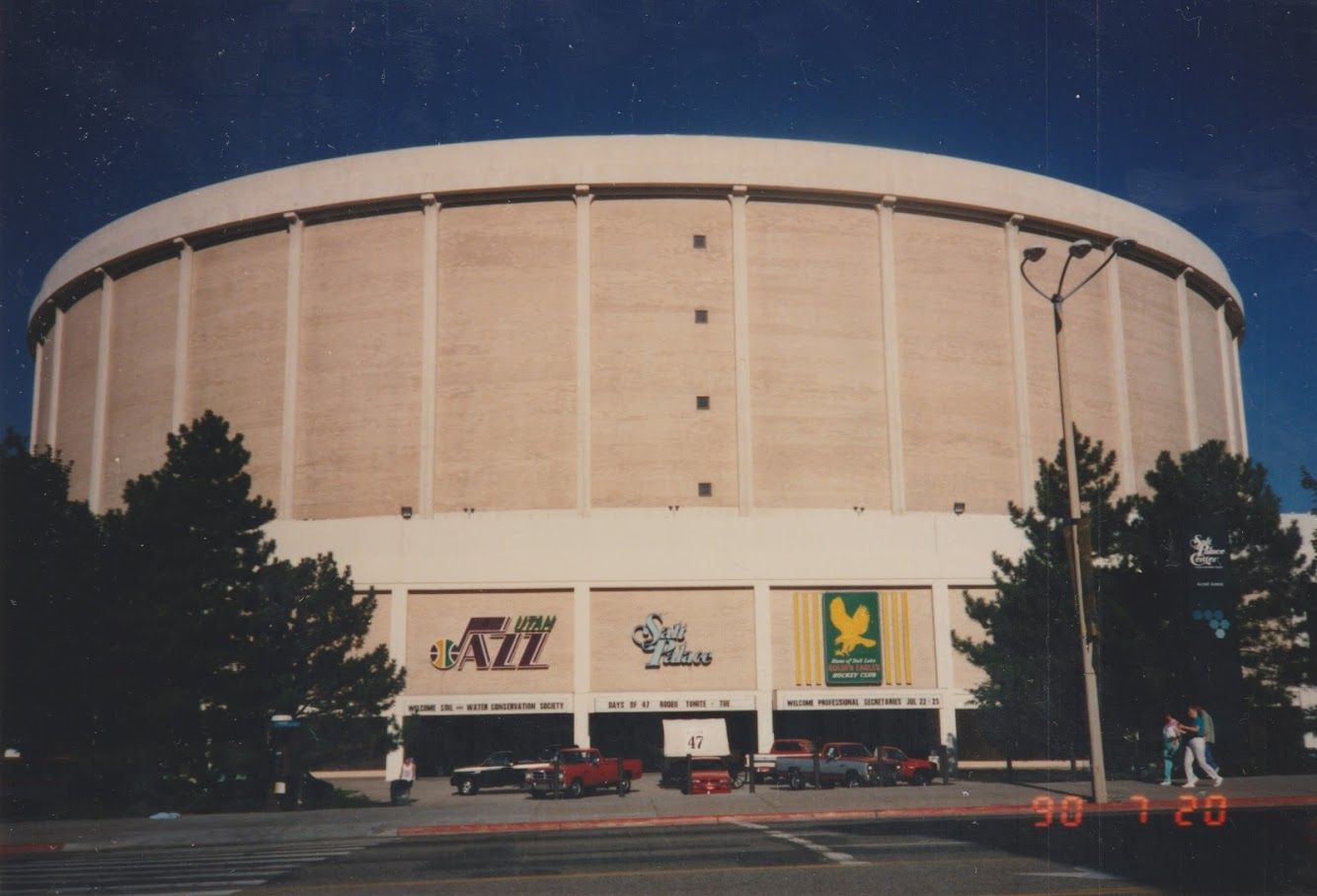
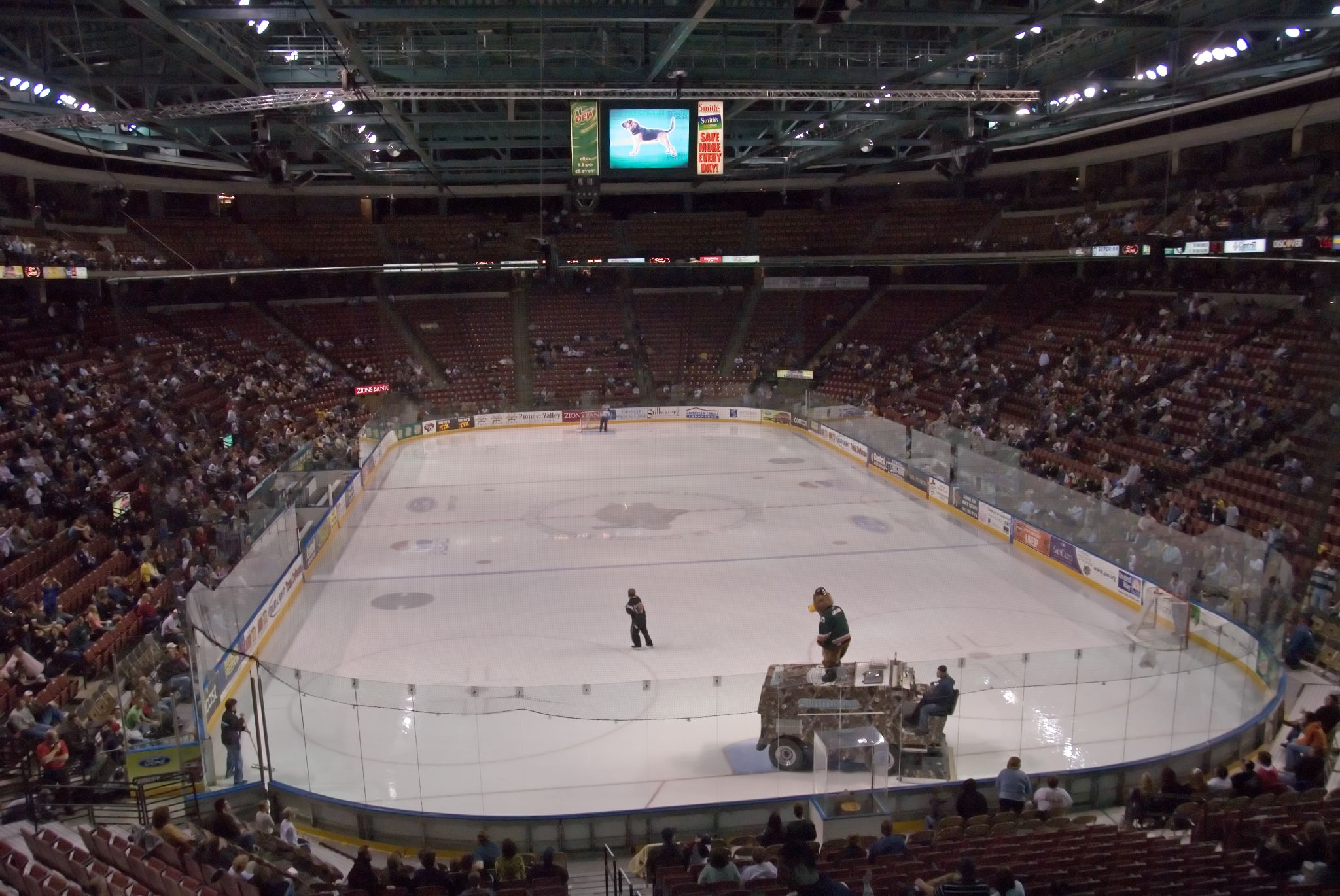
Professional minor-league ice hockey has been played in Salt Lake City since 1969, primarily at the former Salt Palace (above) and Maverik Center (below).

Prior to the arrival of the NHL, Salt Lake City's ice hockey history involved multiple minor-league franchises. The first team to call the area home, the Salt Lake Golden Eagles, played 25 seasons across the Western Hockey League (WHL), Central Hockey League (CHL), and International Hockey League (IHL) from 1969 to 1994. Playing out of the Salt Palace for their first 22 seasons and the then-new Delta Center for their final three, the Golden Eagles won three Adams Cup championships in the CHL and two Turner Cup championships in the IHL, before ultimately being sold and relocating to Auburn Hills, Michigan, as the Detroit Vipers after the 1993–94 IHL season.

After just one season out of ice hockey, Salt Lake City received another IHL franchise in 1995, as the reigning Turner Cup champion Denver Grizzlies, having been replaced by the newly relocated Colorado Avalanche of the NHL, relocated to the Delta Center for the 1995–96 season as the Utah Grizzlies. The Grizzlies spent two seasons in Salt Lake City proper, including a second consecutive Turner Cup championship in 1996; notably, the Cup-clinching game 4 of the Turner Cup Finals saw an attendance of 17,381, at the time the largest single-game attendance in minor-league ice hockey history. The Grizzlies later moved to the newly constructed E Center (since renamed the Maverik Center) in the suburb of West Valley City for the 1997–98 IHL season, and joined the American Hockey League (AHL) in 2001 alongside five other surviving IHL franchises upon the latter's collapse. However, the Grizzlies voluntarily suspended operations for the 2005–06 season, before being sold to Dan Gilbert, the owner of the NBA's Cleveland Cavaliers, and relocating to Cleveland, as the Lake Erie Monsters (later Cleveland Monsters) for the 2007–08 season.

The AHL iteration of the Grizzlies were subsequently replaced by a relocated ECHL franchise of the same name; the franchise had most recently played in Lexington, Kentucky, as the Lexington Men O' War but had become dormant after the 2002–03 ECHL season. The new Grizzlies began play out of the E Center in 2005, immediately after their AHL predecessor had gone dormant, and played 21 seasons in the ECHL. However, the franchise was comparatively unsuccessful; although they missed the playoffs only five times, they won just one division championship and no conference championships, only reaching the conference finals twice. In September 2025, over a year after the Mammoth's arrival, the Grizzlies were sold to an ownership group based in Trenton, New Jersey, where they relocated as the Trenton Ironhawks following the 2025–26 season.

Delta Center previously hosted multiple Los Angeles Kings preseason games as part of the NHL's Frozen Fury series. However, the arena was not considered well suited to host ice hockey permanently, owing to poor sightlines and broadcasting capabilities. Maverik Center and Peaks Ice Arena in the suburb of Provo, hosted the ice hockey tournaments at the 2002 Winter Olympics in Salt Lake City, which featured NHL players. Salt Lake City is also the host city for the 2034 Winter Olympics.

==== Establishment of the team ====
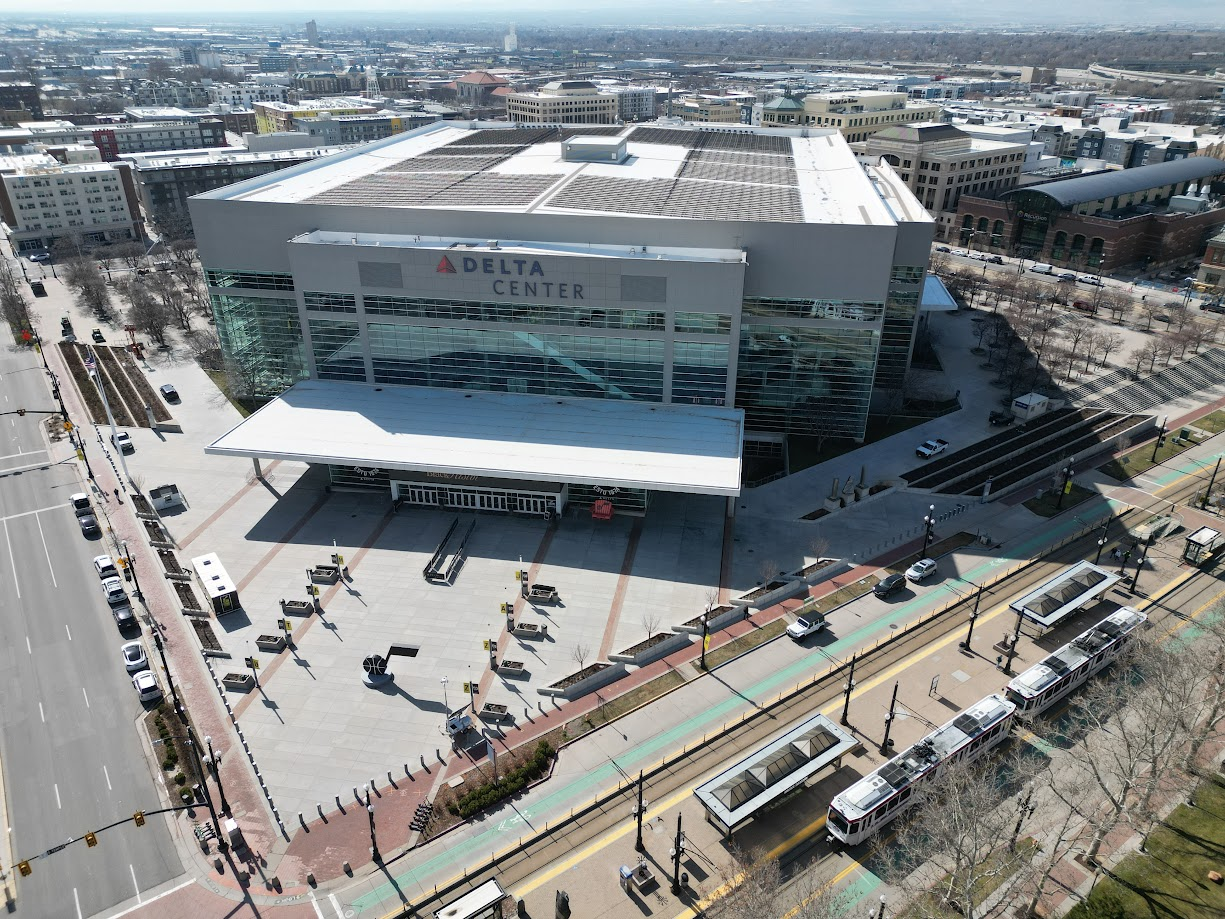
Delta Center, where the Mammoth play their home games

Salt Lake City initially emerged as a potential NHL destination in June 2023, with rumors regarding the Arizona Coyotes' potential relocation spreading after the failure of the New Tempe Arena referendum. Six months later, in January 2024, Ryan Smith, owner of the NBA's Utah Jazz and co-owner of Major League Soccer's Real Salt Lake, petitioned the NHL to begin the process of expansion to Salt Lake City. Discussions to bring an expansion team to the city were revealed to have been underway since early 2022, with the Utah State Senate passing tax legislation in February 2024 to support a new ice hockey-capable downtown arena proposed by Smith; the only condition asked by the Senate was that any potential team be branded "Utah" to honor the state in general, as opposed to any branding using Salt Lake City.

On April 13, 2024, it was reported that, with the NHL's permission, the Coyotes were making efforts to relocate to Salt Lake City following concerns about an indefinite timeframe on a new arena and the effects of continued play at the 4,600-seat Mullett Arena. The deal became official on April 18 after the NHL Board of Governors granted an expansion franchise to Utah using the Coyotes' hockey assets. Under the terms of the agreement, the Coyotes franchise was essentially split in half. The Coyotes franchise was officially considered "inactive", with Utah regarded as an expansion team rather than a successor to the Coyotes, in a similar situation to the Cleveland Browns and Baltimore Ravens of the National Football League.

While the deal was reported in the media as a $1.2 billion "sale" of the Coyotes, it was in reality two separate transactions in which $1 billion was paid by the NHL to Alex Meruelo for the Coyotes franchise, while Smith paid a $1.2 billion expansion fee to the NHL's other owners. The $200 million difference was thus in effect a de facto relocation fee to be shared equally by the other 31 NHL clubs. According to Smith, the team sold more than 11,000 season-ticket deposits in the four hours after going on sale, with 6,000 sold in the first two hours.

The team was formally introduced at the Delta Center on April 26, with over 12,000 fans attending a welcome celebration featuring players and coaches. On May 6, the Smith Entertainment Group announced that a practice facility would be built for the team in the nearby suburb of Sandy, Utah, which had its groundbreaking ceremony on August 12. On June 13, the NHL announced that the sale of the franchise had officially been completed and that the team would be known as "Utah Hockey Club" for their inaugural season.

=== Inaugural season and early years (2024–present) ===
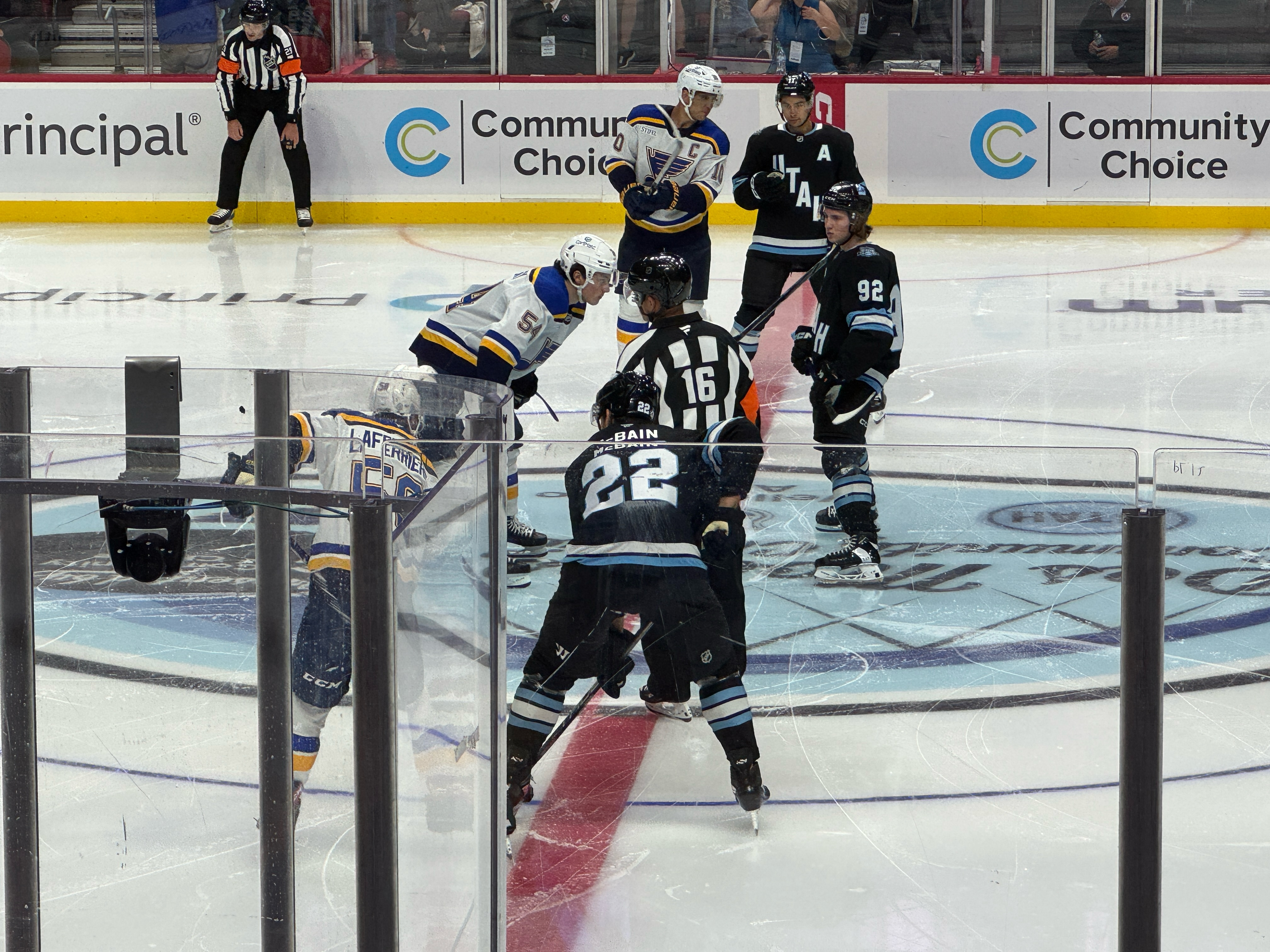
Jack McBain, Logan Cooley, and Dylan Guenther line up for a faceoff during Utah's first preseason game in September 2024.

On June 17, Utah made their first official player signing, with former Coyotes third-round pick Noel Nordh signing his three-year, entry-level contract. This was followed just under two weeks later by their first NHL entry draft, where they selected Kelowna Rockets forward Tij Iginla as their first-ever draft pick at 6th overall.

Utah played their first preseason game on September 22, 2024, defeating the St. Louis Blues 5–3 in a neutral-site matchup played at Wells Fargo Arena in Des Moines, Iowa. On September 23, Utah played their first home preseason game at the Delta Center, defeating the Los Angeles Kings 3–2.

On October 4, Utah named forward Clayton Keller as its first captain in franchise history. On October 8, the team defeated the Chicago Blackhawks 5–2 in its first regular season contest, with Dylan Guenther scoring the first goal. The team's first season ended with a record of 38–31–13, placing them sixth in the Central Division, but ultimately out of playoff contention.

In a more successful second season, Utah clinched the first wild card spot in the 2026 Stanley Cup playoffs, earning their first playoff berth in franchise history. During that season, Utah became the first team in NHL history to play the full 82-game season without any shootouts since that form of tiebreaker was adopted in 2005.

== Team identity ==
=== Name ===
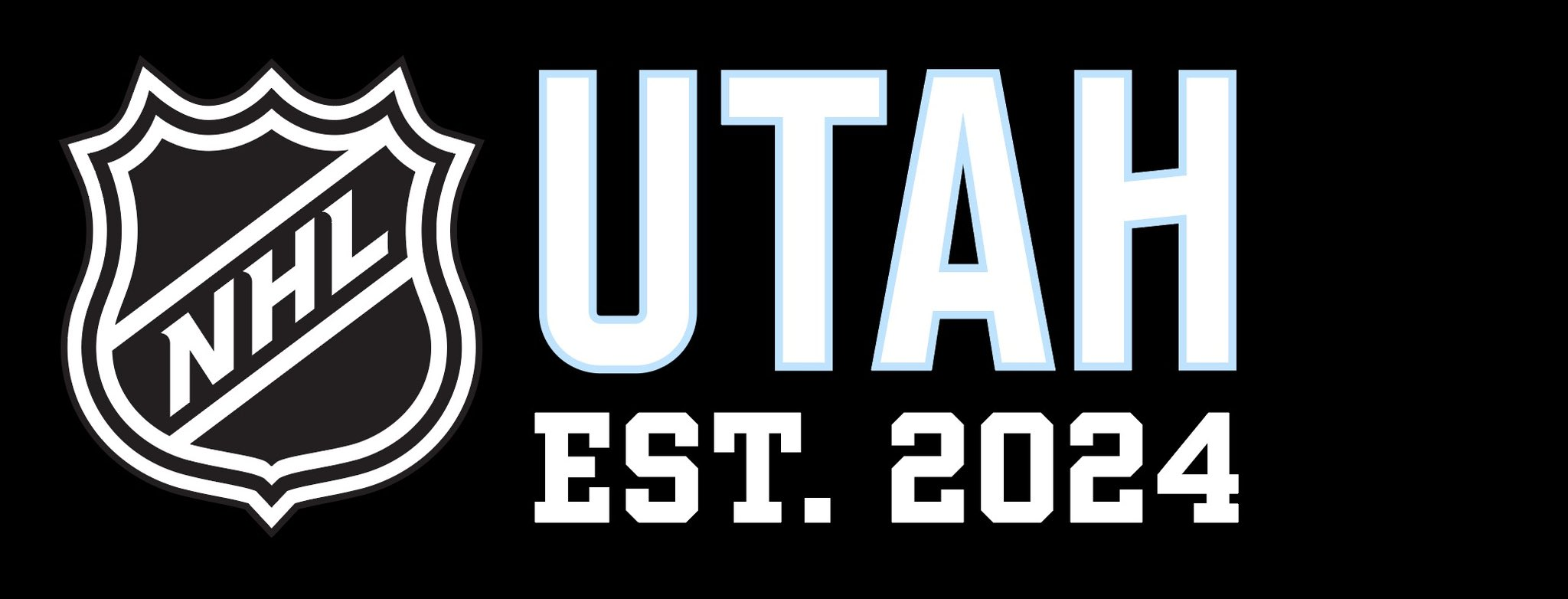
At left, the logo used for the announcement of the team; at right, the commemorative logo used for the franchise's inaugural season.

The team was initially introduced without a name, though Smith confirmed on April 18, 2024, that the franchise would use the "Utah" state moniker, rather than Salt Lake City. After emphasizing not wanting to "rush" the naming process, Smith announced on April 22 that the team identity would be chosen via an eight-name bracket, voted on by fans using the Smith-founded Qualtrics platform. In the days surrounding the team's founding, a law firm filed trademarks for a multitude of names on behalf of an anonymously owned LLC; these included Utah Hockey Club (Utah HC), Blizzard, Fury, Venom, Yetis, Outlaws, Ice, and Mammoth.

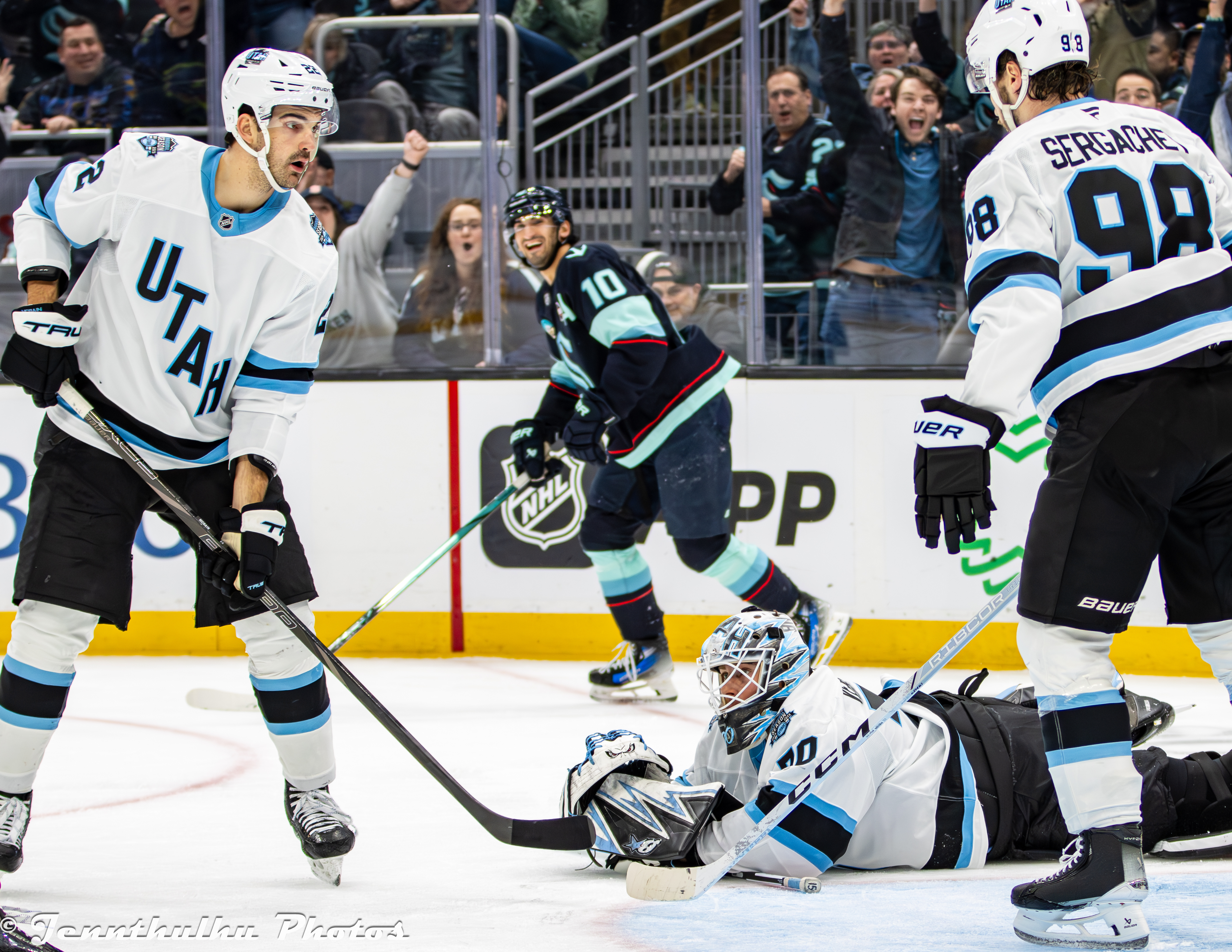
Jack McBain, Karel Vejmelka, and Mikhail Sergachev wearing the team's inaugural road uniforms in December 2024.

On May 8, the Smith Entertainment Group confirmed the team would play their first season simply named "Utah", without an official logo, mascot, or team colors, and with "Utah" written across the jerseys. At the same time, SEG released a Qualtrics poll featuring the 20 name finalists. The options included Black Diamonds, Blast, Blizzard, Canyons, Caribou, Freeze, Frost, Fury, Glaciers, Utah HC (Hockey Club), Hive, Ice, Mammoth, Mountaineers, Outlaws, Powder, Squall, Swarm, Venom, and Yeti. On May 29, Smith confirmed on The Pat McAfee Show that the club had narrowed the list down to four names, specifically mentioning the Mammoth and the Yeti. On June 6, however, the six finalists were revealed to be Blizzard, Utah HC, Mammoth, Outlaws, Venom, and Yeti, and a second round of polling began.

On June 13, it was announced that the team would be known as the "Utah Hockey Club" for the 2024–25 season. In January 2025, it was revealed that the "Utah Yetis" and singular "Utah Yeti" brands were refused by the U.S. Patent and Trademark Office due to its similarity to the company name Yeti Holdings. Prior to the rejection, it had been widely expected, even among Utah players, that the "Yeti" name would be chosen. On January 29, the team announced that fans attending their following four home games in late January and early February could vote for a permanent identity for the club, with the final three options being the existing Utah Hockey Club, Utah Mammoth, and Utah Wasatch. While the Wasatch name was not one of the six finalists, it was intended to honor the idea of a mythical snow creature similar to the yeti, with a "Utah-centric" approach inspired by the Wasatch Mountains. One day later, on January 30, the team announced that "Wasatch" was being removed from the survey, being replaced by previously announced finalist "Utah Outlaws". On April 30, speculation arose that "Mammoth" was the selected name following leaks online that showed the team changing its YouTube handle to @UtahMammoth. These speculations were confirmed on May 7, when the team officially revealed their permanent name as the Utah Mammoth. A new logo and uniforms were also revealed, retaining the same color scheme.

=== Logo, colors, and uniforms ===
The temporary logo and uniforms used for the franchise's inaugural season as the Utah Hockey Club.

On June 13, 2024, the same day that the temporary name was revealed, the team also released their logos, colors, and jerseys for the inaugural season; the primary logo depicts a roundel with a "Utah" wordmark in the center, ringed with "Hockey Club" and colored with mountain blue, rock black, and salt white. The secondary logo features a "Utah Hockey Club" wordmark over an outline of Utah itself. The home uniforms consisted of a black base with a diagonal "UTAH" wordmark across the front, their "Inaugural Season" patch on both shoulders, with blue and white striping, with the road uniforms using a white base with black and blue striping.

On May 7, 2025, on the day the permanent "Mammoth" name was unveiled, a new logo and uniform set were unveiled to accompany the name change. Using the same blue, black, and white color scheme, the logo features a "Mountain Mammoth" with the top of the mammoth's head showing a depiction of mountain peaks, a nod to Utah's Wasatch Mountains. One of the mountains also forms an outline resembling the borders of the state of Utah. For the home uniforms, the "UTAH" wordmark was replaced with the new primary logo. The road uniforms retained the diagonal "UTAH" wordmark, but all text on both uniforms were updated to the new "Mammoth Sans" font. The inaugural season shoulder patches were replaced on the home uniforms by a Utah state outline alternate logo, while the primary mammoth logo replaced them on the road jersey.

=== Mascots ===
On October 7, 2024, the team announced that Jazz Bear, the mascot of the Utah Jazz, would also serve as the team's mascot during their inaugural season.

On October 15, 2025, the team unveiled their permanent mascot, a blue woolly mammoth named Tusky, before the team's first home game under the Mammoth name.

=== Nicknames ===
During the inaugural season, the team's fanbase started referring to themselves as the "Clubbers", a play on the team's temporary "Hockey Club" moniker. The fans still use the name as an ode to their inaugural season.

== Team information ==
=== Broadcasting ===
==== Television ====
On April 18, 2024, shortly after the establishment of the team, it was announced that the team had reached an agreement with the Scripps Sports to broadcast Utah NHL games on their Provo-based station KUPX-TV; KUPX had previously served as the Coyotes' affiliate in the market, and also broadcasts Vegas Golden Knights games. The telecasts are produced by Smith Entertainment Group's SEG Media division. The team also launched a subscription streaming service known as UtahHC+ (now Mammoth+), which carries the games and other video content related to the team. The service is an expansion of SEG's partnership with Kiswe for the Utah Jazz's Jazz+ service introduced the previous season; for this season, both services introduced a joint platform known as SEG+.

On September 4, Utah announced that former Coyotes play-by-play announcer Matt McConnell had been hired for the same position, with ESPN analyst Dominic Moore and Seattle Kraken color analyst Nick Olczyk serving as TV analysts.

==== Radio ====
On September 20, 2024, the team announced an agreement with Bonneville International to broadcast games on KZNS, branded as the KSL Sports Zone, with Mike Folta serving as the play-by-play announcer. Radio broadcasts are additionally simulcast on the KSL Sports app and website.

=== Minor league affiliates ===
With the transfer of assets from the Coyotes, Utah inherited the Tucson Roadrunners as their American Hockey League (AHL) affiliate. On July 31, 2024, Utah announced a one-year affiliation agreement with the Allen Americans of the ECHL for the 2024–25 season. For the 2025–26 season, the Mammoth operated without an ECHL affiliate.

== Season-by-season record ==
This is a list of the seasons completed by the Mammoth.

Key: GP = Games played, W = Wins, L = Losses, OTL = Overtime Losses, Pts = Points, GF = Goals for, GA = Goals against

| Season | GP | W | L | OTL | Pts | GF | GA | Finish | Playoffs |
|---|---|---|---|---|---|---|---|---|---|
| 2024–25 | 82 | 38 | 31 | 13 | 89 | 241 | 251 | 6th, Central | Did not qualify |
| 2025–26 | 82 | 43 | 33 | 6 | 92 | 268 | 240 | 4th, Central | Lost in first round, 2–4 (Golden Knights) |

== Players and personnel ==
=== Current roster ===
Updated October 22, 2026

| No. | Nat | Player | Pos | S/G | Age | Acquired | Birthplace |
|---|---|---|---|---|---|---|---|
| 50 | (Russia) | Daniil But | LW | R | 21 | 2024 | Yaroslavl, Russia |
| 53 | (Canada) | Michael Carcone | LW | L | 30 | 2024 | Ajax, Ontario |
| 92 | (United States) | Logan Cooley | C | L | 22 | 2024 | Pittsburgh, Pennsylvania |
| 33 | (Canada) | Sebastian Cossa | G | L | 23 | 2026 | Hamilton, Ontario |
| 67 | (Canada) | Lawson Crouse (A) | LW | L | 29 | 2024 | Mount Brydges, Ontario |
| 57 | (United States) | Nick DeSimone | D | R | 31 | 2025 | East Amherst, New York |
| 84 | (Russia) | Artem Duda | D | L | 22 | 2024 | Moscow, Russia |
| 11 | (Canada) | Dylan Guenther | RW | R | 23 | 2024 | Edmonton, Alberta |
| 27 | (Canada) | Barrett Hayton | C | L | 26 | 2024 | Peterborough, Ontario |
| 9 | (United States) | Clayton Keller (C) | C | L | 28 | 2024 | Chesterfield, Missouri |
| 10 | (Canada) | Maveric Lamoureux | D | R | 22 | 2024 | Laval, Quebec |
| 72 | (United States) | Anders Lee | LW | L | 36 | 2026 | Edina, Minnesota |
| 6 | (United States) | John Marino | D | R | 29 | 2024 | North Easton, Massachusetts |
| 22 | (Canada) | Jack McBain | C | L | 26 | 2024 | Toronto, Ontario |
| 38 | (Canada) | Liam O'Brien | LW | L | 32 | 2024 | Halifax, Nova Scotia |
| 20 | (United States) | Andrew Peeke | D | R | 28 | 2026 | Parkland, Florida |
| 8 | (United States) | Nick Schmaltz | C | R | 30 | 2024 | Madison, Wisconsin |
| 88 | (United States) | Nate Schmidt | D | L | 35 | 2025 | St. Cloud, Minnesota |
| 98 | (Russia) | Mikhail Sergachev (A) | D | L | 28 | 2024 | Nizhnekamsk, Russia |
| 26 | (Russia) | Dmitriy Simashev | D | L | 21 | 2024 | Kostroma, Russia |
| 82 | (Sweden) | Kevin Stenlund | C | L | 30 | 2024 | Stockholm, Sweden |
| 16 | (United States) | Vincent Trocheck | C | R | 33 | 2026 | Pittsburgh, Pennsylvania |
| 70 | (Czech Republic) | Karel Vejmelka | G | R | 30 | 2024 | Třebíč, Czech Republic |
| 52 | (Canada) | MacKenzie Weegar | D | R | 32 | 2026 | Ottawa, Ontario |
| 56 | (United States) | Kailer Yamamoto | RW | R | 28 | 2024 | Spokane, Washington |

=== Owners ===
The team is owned by Smith Entertainment Group, which is controlled by businessman Ryan Smith and his wife Ashley Smith.

=== Team captains ===
- Clayton Keller, 2024–present

=== General managers ===
- Bill Armstrong, 2024–present

=== Head coaches ===
- Andre Tourigny, 2024–present

=== First-round draft picks ===
- 2024: Tij Iginla (6th overall), Cole Beaudoin (24th overall)
- 2025: Caleb Desnoyers (4th overall)
- 2026: Ethan Belchetz (17th overall)

== Franchise records ==
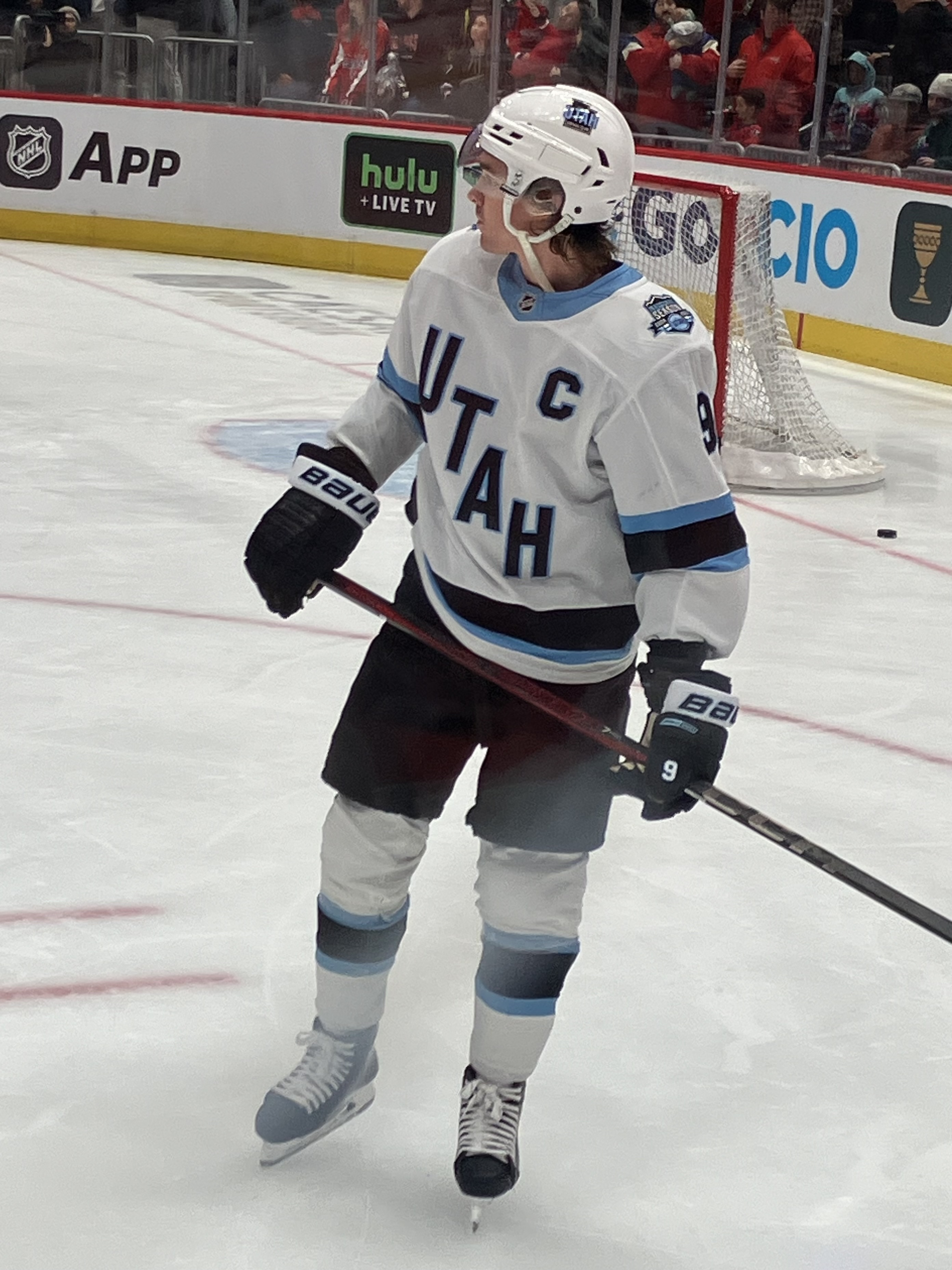
Clayton Keller, the franchise's first captain, leads Utah in assists and points.

=== Scoring leaders ===
These are the top-ten point-scorers in franchise history. Figures are updated after each completed NHL regular season.

- * – current Mammoth player

Note: Pos = Position; GP = Games Played; G = Goals; A = Assists; Pts = Points; P/G = Points per game

Points
| Player | Pos | GP | G | A | Pts | P/G |
|---|---|---|---|---|---|---|
| Clayton Keller* | RW | 163 | 56 | 122 | 178 | 1.09 |
| Nick Schmaltz* | C | 164 | 53 | 84 | 137 | .83 |
| Dylan Guenther* | RW | 149 | 67 | 66 | 133 | .84 |
| Mikhail Sergachev* | D | 155 | 25 | 87 | 112 | .72 |
| Logan Cooley* | C | 129 | 49 | 59 | 108 | .89 |
| Barrett Hayton* | C | 149 | 30 | 41 | 71 | .48 |
| Lawson Crouse* | LW | 162 | 36 | 26 | 62 | .38 |
| Jack McBain* | C | 157 | 22 | 30 | 52 | .33 |
| Michael Carcone* | LW | 132 | 23 | 27 | 50 | .38 |
| John Marino* | D | 115 | 5 | 45 | 50 | .43 |

Goals
| Player | Pos | G |
|---|---|---|
| Dylan Guenther* | RW | 67 |
| Clayton Keller* | RW | 56 |
| Nick Schmaltz* | C | 53 |
| Logan Cooley* | C | 49 |
| Lawson Crouse* | LW | 36 |
| Barrett Hayton* | C | 30 |
| JJ Peterka | RW | 25 |
| Mikhail Sergachev* | D | 25 |
| Michael Carcone* | LW | 23 |
| Jack McBain* | C | 22 |

Assists
| Player | Pos | A |
|---|---|---|
| Clayton Keller* | RW | 122 |
| Mikhail Sergachev* | D | 87 |
| Nick Schmaltz* | C | 84 |
| Dylan Guenther* | RW | 66 |
| Logan Cooley* | C | 59 |
| John Marino* | D | 45 |
| Barrett Hayton* | C | 41 |
| Ian Cole | D | 36 |
| Jack McBain* | C | 30 |
| Sean Durzi | D | 29 |

=== Goaltending leaders ===
These are the top-ten goaltenders in franchise history by wins. Figures are updated after each completed NHL regular season.

- * – current Mammoth player

Note: GP = Games played; W = Wins; L = Losses; T/O = Ties/Overtime losses; GA = Goal against; GAA = Goals against average; SA = Shots against; SV% = Save percentage; SO = Shutouts

Goaltenders
| Player | GP | W | L | T/O | GA | GAA | SA | SV% | SO |
|---|---|---|---|---|---|---|---|---|---|
| Karel Vejmelka* | 122 | 64 | 42 | 11 | 314 | 2.67 | 3,135 | .900 | 3 |
| Connor Ingram | 22 | 9 | 8 | 4 | 66 | 3.27 | 558 | .882 | 0 |
| Vítek Vaněček | 22 | 5 | 13 | 3 | 59 | 2.93 | 506 | .883 | 1 |
| Jaxson Stauber* | 6 | 2 | 1 | 1 | 17 | 3.26 | 158 | .892 | 1 |
| Matt Villalta | 1 | 1 | 0 | 0 | 3 | 3.00 | 31 | .903 | 0 |

=== Team records ===
- Most goals in a season – Dylan Guenther, 40 (2025–26)
- Most assists in a season – Clayton Keller, 62 (2025–26)
- Most points in a season – Clayton Keller, 90 (2024–25)
- Most points in a season, defenceman – Mikhail Sergachev, 59 (2025–26)
- Most points in a season, rookie – Josh Doan, 19 (2024–25)
- Most penalty minutes in a season – Michael Kesselring, 89 (2024–25)
- Best +/– in a season – John Marino, +42 (2025–26)
- Most wins in a season – Karel Vejmelka, 38 (2025–26)
- Most shutouts in a season – Karel Vejmelka, 2 (2025–26)
- Lowest goals against average in a season (min. 30 games played) – Karel Vejmelka, 2.58 (2024–25)
- Best save percentage in a season (min. 30 games played) – Karel Vejmelka, .904 (2024–25)
