= Martin Hanzal =

Czech ice hockey player (born 1987)

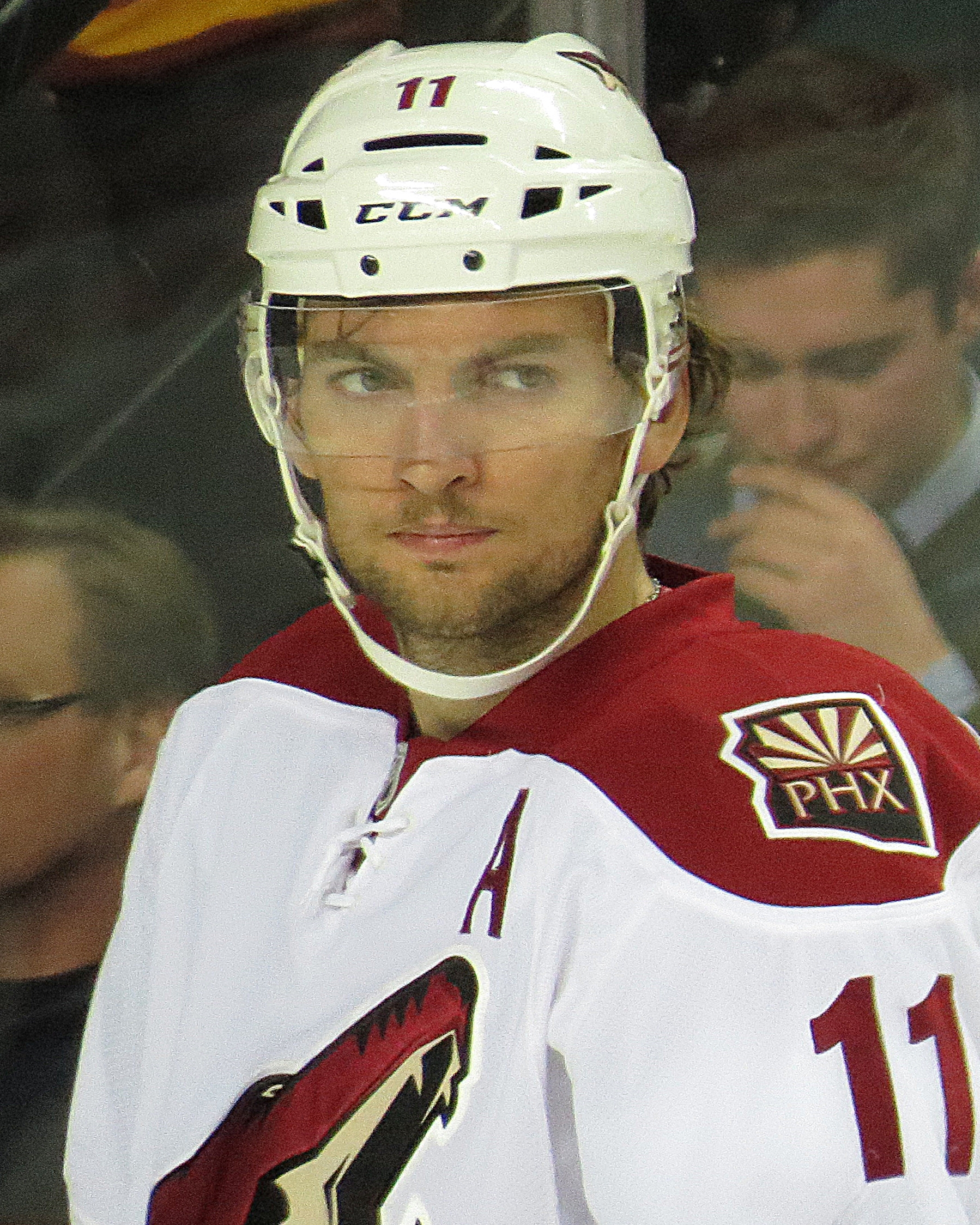
- Hanzal with the Phoenix Coyotes in 2014
- Born: 20 February 1987 (age 39) Písek, Czechoslovakia
- Height: 6 ft 6 in (198 cm)
- Weight: 226 lb (103 kg; 16 st 2 lb)
- Position: Centre
- Shot: Left
- Played for: Arizona Coyotes; HC Motor České Budějovice; Minnesota Wild; Dallas Stars
- National team: Czech Republic
- NHL draft: 17th overall, 2005; Phoenix Coyotes
- Playing career: 2007–2019

Martin Hanzal (Czech pronunciation: [ˈmarcɪn ˈɦanzal]; born 20 February 1987) is a Czech former professional ice hockey centre. He was drafted by the Phoenix Coyotes in the first round, 17th overall, of the 2005 NHL entry draft.

== Playing career ==
=== Amateur ===
As a youth, Hanzal played in the 2001 Quebec International Pee-Wee Hockey Tournament with a team from Chomutov.

Hanzal was the Phoenix Coyotes' first-round draft pick, 17th overall, in the 2005 NHL entry draft from hometown team HC České Budějovice. He then moved to North America to play for the Omaha Lancers of the United States Hockey League (USHL) in the 2005–06 season. In 19 games played with Omaha, he scored 19 points, and in five playoff games, he had one goal.

Hanzal then played major junior hockey during the 2006–07 season with the Red Deer Rebels of the Western Hockey League (WHL) after being acquired from the Chilliwack Bruins before even playing a game with the latter. He led the Rebels in scoring with 85 points in 60 games.

=== Professional ===
==== Phoenix/Arizona Coyotes ====
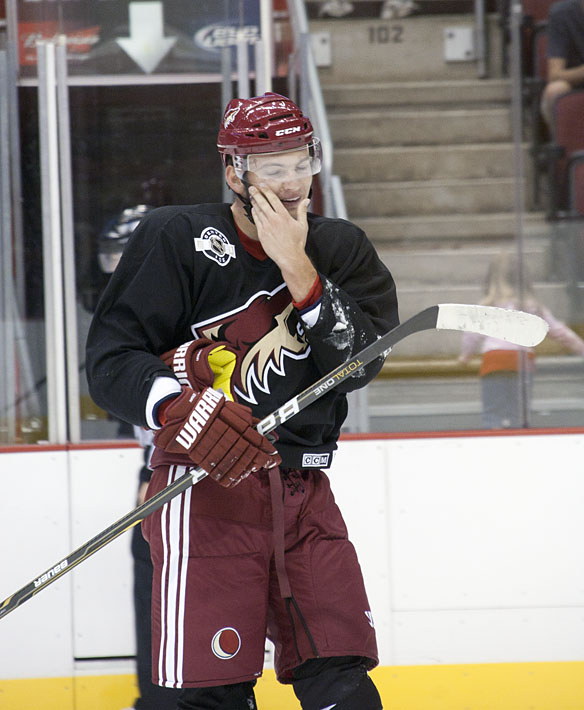
Hanzal training with the Coyotes

Hanzal made his professional debut with the Coyotes in the 2007–08 season. He finished with eight goals and 35 points on the season, placing him sixth in team scoring. He also ranked ninth among NHL rookies in both points and assists. On 4 December 2008, Hanzal scored his first career hat-trick against the Toronto Maple Leafs in only 20:27 of play time, setting the record for the fastest hat-trick recorded in Coyotes history.

On 8 October 2011, Hanzal was named an alternate captain for the Coyotes.

On 12 April 2012, Hanzal scored the game-winning goal in overtime of Game 1 of the Western Conference Quarterfinals of the 2012 Stanley Cup playoffs against the Chicago Blackhawks, giving the Coyotes a 3–2 victory and a 1–0 series lead. His goal came from a redirect of a shot from the blueline by teammate Adrian Aucoin past Blackhawks goaltender Corey Crawford.

On 14 November 2014, during the 2014–15 season, Hanzal scored his second career hat trick in a 5–0 rout against the Vancouver Canucks; two of the goals were scored only nine seconds apart. Hanzal's hat trick ended up being a natural hat trick, meaning all three of his goals were scored without the opposing team scoring.

Later in the season, on 15 February 2015, the Coyotes announced that Hanzal was to have season-ending back surgery. Prior to the announcement, he had not played for Arizona since 29 January, against the Toronto Maple Leafs.

==== Minnesota Wild ====
On 27 February 2017, in the midst of the 2016–17 season, his ninth season with the Coyotes and in the final year of his five-year contract, Hanzal collected 26 points in 51 games before his tenure came to an end with Arizona. He was dealt alongside Ryan White and a fourth-round pick in 2017, to the Minnesota Wild in exchange for a 1st-round pick in 2017, 2nd-round pick in 2018, conditional 4th-round pick in 2019, and Grayson Downing on 26 February 2017.

==== Dallas Stars ====
On 1 July 2017, Hanzal as a first time free agent, signed a three-year, $14.25 million contract with the Dallas Stars. In his first season with the Stars in 2017–18, Hanzal missed the majority of training camp with the foot injury. He was then hampered by multiple injuries limiting his effectiveness in recording just 5 goals and 10 points in just 38 games. Approaching the final push for the post-season, on 9 March 2018, it was announced that Hanzal was ruled out for the remainder of the season to undergo a spinal fusion surgery to correct a persistent back injury with a recovery of six to seven months.

==== Return to Czech Republic ====
With his contract concluded with the Stars during the July pause in the 2019–20 season due to the COVID-19 pandemic, Hanzal having earlier returned to continue his rehabilitation in the Czech Republic, opted to continue his playing career by making a return with newly formed club, HC Samson České Budějovice at the Regional Hockey tier to begin the 2020–21 season. On 26 October 2020, Hanzal announced his retirement from the NHL after 12 seasons.

== International play ==
In 2006 and 2007, Hanzal represented the Czech Republic at the IIHF World U20 Championship. He played his first senior game for the Czechs at the 2008 World Championships, and has played in four tournaments for the national team.

== Career statistics ==
=== Regular season and playoffs ===
| | | | Regular season | | | | | Playoffs |
| Season | Team | League | GP | G | A | Pts | PIM | GP | G | A | Pts | PIM |
|---|---|---|---|---|---|---|---|---|---|---|---|---|
| 2003–04 | HC České Budějovice | Czech.18 | 2 | 0 | 2 | 2 | 2 | 2 | 1 | 0 | 1 | 4 |
| 2003–04 | HC České Budějovice | Czech.20 | 53 | 15 | 7 | 22 | 32 | — | — | — | — | — |
| 2004–05 | HC České Budějovice | Czech.20 | 37 | 22 | 22 | 44 | 80 | — | — | — | — | — |
| 2004–05 | HC České Budějovice | Czech.1 | 15 | 1 | 2 | 3 | 2 | 4 | 0 | 0 | 0 | 2 |
| 2005–06 | HC České Budějovice | Czech.20 | 7 | 3 | 5 | 8 | 20 | — | — | — | — | — |
| 2005–06 | HC České Budějovice | ELH | 19 | 0 | 1 | 1 | 10 | — | — | — | — | — |
| 2005–06 | BK Mladá Boleslav | Czech.1 | 5 | 2 | 0 | 2 | 0 | — | — | — | — | — |
| 2005–06 | Omaha Lancers | USHL | 19 | 4 | 15 | 19 | 30 | 5 | 1 | 0 | 1 | 4 |
| 2006–07 | Red Deer Rebels | WHL | 60 | 26 | 59 | 85 | 94 | 6 | 2 | 7 | 9 | 19 |
| 2007–08 | Phoenix Coyotes | NHL | 72 | 8 | 27 | 35 | 28 | — | — | — | — | — |
| 2008–09 | Phoenix Coyotes | NHL | 74 | 11 | 20 | 31 | 40 | — | — | — | — | — |
| 2009–10 | Phoenix Coyotes | NHL | 81 | 11 | 22 | 33 | 104 | 7 | 0 | 3 | 3 | 10 |
| 2010–11 | Phoenix Coyotes | NHL | 61 | 16 | 10 | 26 | 54 | 4 | 1 | 2 | 3 | 8 |
| 2011–12 | Phoenix Coyotes | NHL | 64 | 8 | 26 | 34 | 63 | 12 | 3 | 3 | 6 | 29 |
| 2012–13 | HC Motor České Budějovice | ELH | 18 | 8 | 11 | 19 | 73 | — | — | — | — | — |
| 2012–13 | Phoenix Coyotes | NHL | 39 | 11 | 12 | 23 | 24 | — | — | — | — | — |
| 2013–14 | Phoenix Coyotes | NHL | 65 | 15 | 25 | 40 | 73 | — | — | — | — | — |
| 2014–15 | Arizona Coyotes | NHL | 37 | 8 | 16 | 24 | 31 | — | — | — | — | — |
| 2015–16 | Arizona Coyotes | NHL | 64 | 13 | 28 | 41 | 77 | — | — | — | — | — |
| 2016–17 | Arizona Coyotes | NHL | 51 | 16 | 10 | 26 | 43 | — | — | — | — | — |
| 2016–17 | Minnesota Wild | NHL | 20 | 4 | 9 | 13 | 10 | 5 | 1 | 0 | 1 | 0 |
| 2017–18 | Dallas Stars | NHL | 38 | 5 | 5 | 10 | 23 | — | — | — | — | — |
| 2018–19 | Dallas Stars | NHL | 7 | 1 | 1 | 2 | 4 | — | — | — | — | — |
| NHL totals | | | 673 | 127 | 211 | 338 | 574 | 28 | 5 | 8 | 13 | 47 |

=== International ===
| Year | Team | Event | Result | GP | G | A | Pts | PIM |
|---|---|---|---|---|---|---|---|---|
| 2005 | Czech Republic | WJC18 | 4th | 7 | 4 | 3 | 7 | 10 |
| 2006 | Czech Republic | WJC | 6th | 6 | 0 | 2 | 2 | 4 |
| 2007 | Czech Republic | WJC | 5th | 6 | 2 | 1 | 3 | 6 |
| 2008 | Czech Republic | WC | 5th | 6 | 0 | 3 | 3 | 8 |
| 2013 | Czech Republic | WC | 7th | 8 | 1 | 3 | 4 | 2 |
| 2014 | Czech Republic | OG | 6th | 4 | 0 | 1 | 1 | 4 |
| 2016 | Czech Republic | WCH | 6th | 3 | 1 | 1 | 2 | 2 |
| Junior totals | | | | 19 | 6 | 6 | 12 | 20 |
| Senior totals | | | | 21 | 2 | 8 | 10 | 16 |

== Awards and honours ==
| Award | Year |
|---|---|
WHL
| East Second All-Star Team | 2007 |

Awards and achievements
| Preceded by Blake Wheeler | Phoenix Coyotes first-round draft pick 2005 | Succeeded by Peter Mueller |
