= List of Arizona Coyotes draft picks =

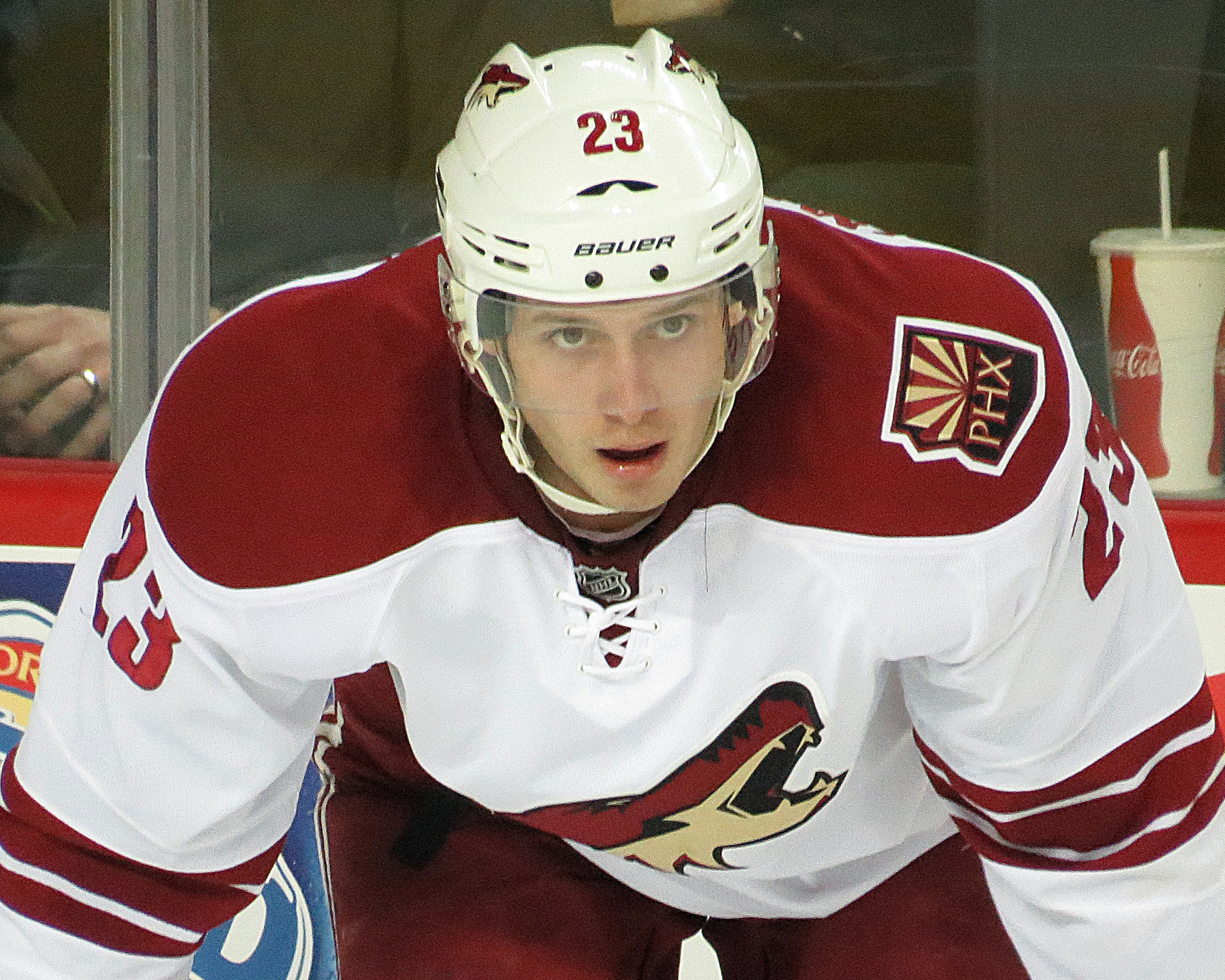
The Coyotes selected Oliver Ekman-Larsson 6th overall in the 2009 NHL entry draft.

This is a complete list of ice hockey players who were drafted in the National Hockey League's entry draft by the Arizona Coyotes franchise. It includes every player who was drafted, regardless of whether they played for the team.

== Key ==
Played at least one game with the Coyotes
Spent entire NHL career with the Coyotes

General terms and abbreviations
Term or abbreviation	Definition
Draft	The year that the player was selected
Round	The round of the draft in which the player was selected
Pick	The overall position in the draft at which the player was selected

Position abbreviations
Abbreviation	Definition
G	Goaltender
D	Defense
LW	Left wing
C	Center
RW	Right wing
F	Forward

Abbreviations for statistical columns
Abbreviation	Definition
Pos	Position
GP	Games played
G	Goals
A	Assists
Pts	Points
PIM	Penalties in minutes
W	Wins
L	Losses
T	Ties
OT	Overtime/shootout losses
GAA	Goals against average
—	Does not apply

== Draft picks ==
Statistics are complete as of the 2024–25 NHL season and show each player's career regular season totals in the NHL. Wins, losses, ties, overtime losses and goals against average apply to goaltenders and are used only for players at that position.

Draft	Round	Pick	Player	Nationality	Pos	GP	G	A	Pts	PIM	W	L	T	OT	GAA
1996	1	11	Dan Focht	Canada	D	82	2	6	8	145	—	—	—	—	—
1996	1	24	Daniel Briere	Canada	C	973	307	389	696	744	—	—	—	—	—
1996	3	62	Per-Anton Lundstrom	Sweden	D	—	—	—	—	—	—	—	—	—	—
1996	5	119	Richard Lintner	Slovakia	D	112	8	12	20	54	—	—	—	—	—
1996	6	139	Robert Esche	United States	G	186	0	8	8	65	78	64	16	6	2.75
1996	7	174	Trevor Letowski	Canada	C	616	84	117	201	209	—	—	—	—	—
1996	8	200	Nick Lent	United States	RW	—	—	—	—	—	—	—	—	—	—
1996	9	226	Marc-Etienne Hubert	Canada	C	—	—	—	—	—	—	—	—	—	—
1997	2	43	Juha Gustafsson	Finland	D	—	—	—	—	—	—	—	—	—	—
1997	4	96	Scott McCallum	Canada	D	—	—	—	—	—	—	—	—	—	—
1997	5	123	Curtis Suter	Canada	D	—	—	—	—	—	—	—	—	—	—
1997	6	151	Robert Francz	Germany	LW	—	—	—	—	—	—	—	—	—	—
1997	8	207	Alex Andreyev	Latvia	D	—	—	—	—	—	—	—	—	—	—
1997	9	233	Wyatt Smith	United States	C	211	10	22	32	65	—	—	—	—	—
1998	1	14	Patrick DesRochers	Canada	G	11	0	0	0	2	2	6	1	—	3.67
1998	2	43	Ossi Vaananen	Finland	D	479	13	55	68	482	—	—	—	—	—
1998	3	73	Pat O'Leary	United States	C	—	—	—	—	—	—	—	—	—	—
1998	4	100	Ryan Van Buskirk	Canada	D	—	—	—	—	—	—	—	—	—	—
1998	5	115	Jay Leach	United States	D	70	1	2	3	60	—	—	—	—	—
1998	5	116	Josh Blackburn	United States	G	—	—	—	—	—	—	—	—	—	—
1998	5	129	Robert Schnabel	Czech Republic	D	22	0	3	3	34	—	—	—	—	—
1998	6	160	Rickard Wallin	Sweden	C	79	8	11	19	34	—	—	—	—	—
1998	7	187	Erik Westrum	United States	C	27	1	2	3	22	—	—	—	—	—
1998	8	214	Justin Hansen	Canada	C	—	—	—	—	—	—	—	—	—	—
1999	1	15	Scott Kelman	Canada	C	—	—	—	—	—	—	—	—	—	—
1999	1	19	Kirill Safronov	Russia	D	35	2	2	4	16	—	—	—	—	—
1999	2	53	Brad Ralph	Canada	C	1	0	0	0	0	—	—	—	—	—
1999	3	71	Jason Jaspers	Canada	C	9	0	1	1	6	—	—	—	—	—
1999	4	116	Ryan Lauzon	Canada	C	—	—	—	—	—	—	—	—	—	—
1999	4	123	Preston Mizzi	Canada	C	—	—	—	—	—	—	—	—	—	—
1999	6	168	Erik Lewerstrom	Sweden	D	—	—	—	—	—	—	—	—	—	—
1999	8	234	Goran Bezina	Switzerland	D	3	0	0	0	2	—	—	—	—	—
1999	9	262	Alexei Litvinenko	Kazakhstan	D	—	—	—	—	—	—	—	—	—	—
2000	1	19	Krystofer Kolanos	Canada	C	149	20	22	42	94	—	—	—	—	—
2000	2	53	Alexander Tatarinov	Russia	RW	—	—	—	—	—	—	—	—	—	—
2000	3	85	Ramzi Abid	Canada	LW	68	14	16	30	78	—	—	—	—	—
2000	5	160	Nate Kiser	United States	D	—	—	—	—	—	—	—	—	—	—
2000	6	186	Brent Gauvreau	Canada	C	—	—	—	—	—	—	—	—	—	—
2000	7	217	Igor Samoilov	Russia	D	—	—	—	—	—	—	—	—	—	—
2000	8	249	Sami Venalainen	Finland	LW	—	—	—	—	—	—	—	—	—	—
2000	9	281	Peter Fabus	Czech Republic	C	—	—	—	—	—	—	—	—	—	—
2001	1	11	Fredrik Sjostrom	Sweden	RW	489	46	58	104	190	—	—	—	—	—
2001	2	31	Matthew Spiller	Canada	D	68	0	2	2	74	—	—	—	—	—
2001	2	45	Martin Podlesak	Czech Republic	C	—	—	—	—	—	—	—	—	—	—
2001	3	78	Beat Forster	Switzerland	D	—	—	—	—	—	—	—	—	—	—
2001	5	148	David Klema	United States	C	—	—	—	—	—	—	—	—	—	—
2001	6	180	Scott Polaski	United States	RW	—	—	—	—	—	—	—	—	—	—
2001	7	210	Steve Belanger	United States	G	—	—	—	—	—	—	—	—	—	—
2001	8	243	Frantisek Lukes	Czech Republic	LW	—	—	—	—	—	—	—	—	—	—
2001	9	273	Severin Blindenbacher	Switzerland	D	—	—	—	—	—	—	—	—	—	—
2002	1	19	Jakub Koreis	Czech Republic	C	—	—	—	—	—	—	—	—	—	—
2002	1	23	Ben Eager	Canada	LW	407	43	42	85	875	—	—	—	—	—
2002	2	46	David LeNeveu	Canada	G	22	0	0	0	0	5	9	—	2	3.43
2002	3	70	Joe Callahan	United States	D	46	0	4	4	16	—	—	—	—	—
2002	3	80	Matt Jones	United States	D	106	1	10	11	63	—	—	—	—	—
2002	4	97	Lance Monych	Canada	RW	—	—	—	—	—	—	—	—	—	—
2002	5	132	John Zeiler	United States	RW	90	1	4	5	87	—	—	—	—	—
2002	6	186	Jeff Pietrasiak	United States	G	—	—	—	—	—	—	—	—	—	—
2002	7	216	Ladislav Kouba	Czech Republic	LW	—	—	—	—	—	—	—	—	—	—
2002	8	249	Marcus Smith	Canada	D	—	—	—	—	—	—	—	—	—	—
2002	9	280	Russell Spence	Canada	LW	—	—	—	—	—	—	—	—	—	—
2003	3	77	Tyler Redenbach	Canada	C	—	—	—	—	—	—	—	—	—	—
2003	3	80	Dmitri Pestunov	Russia	C	—	—	—	—	—	—	—	—	—	—
2003	4	115	Liam Lindstrom	Canada	C	—	—	—	—	—	—	—	—	—	—
2003	6	178	Ryan Gibbons	Canada	RW	—	—	—	—	—	—	—	—	—	—
2003	7	208	Randall Gelech	Canada	RW	—	—	—	—	—	—	—	—	—	—
2003	8	242	Eduard Lewandowski	Germany	LW	—	—	—	—	—	—	—	—	—	—
2003	9	272	Sean Sullivan	United States	D	—	—	—	—	—	—	—	—	—	—
2003	9	290	Loic Burkhalter	Switzerland	C	—	—	—	—	—	—	—	—	—	—
2004	1	5	Blake Wheeler	United States	RW	1172	321	622	943	764	—	—	—	—	—
2004	2	35	Logan Stephenson	Canada	D	—	—	—	—	—	—	—	—	—	—
2004	2	50	Enver Lisin	Russia	RW	135	24	18	42	64	—	—	—	—	—
2004	4	103	Roman Tomanek	Slovakia	RW	—	—	—	—	—	—	—	—	—	—
2004	4	119	Kevin Porter	United States	C	249	29	29	58	60	—	—	—	—	—
2004	6	168	Kevin Cormier	Canada	LW	—	—	—	—	—	—	—	—	—	—
2004	7	199	Chad Kolarik	United States	RW	6	0	1	1	2	—	—	—	—	—
2004	8	240	Aaron Gagnon	Canada	C	38	3	2	5	2	—	—	—	—	—
2004	9	261	Will Engasser	United States	LW	—	—	—	—	—	—	—	—	—	—
2004	9	265	Daniel Winnik	Canada	C	798	82	169	251	367	—	—	—	—	—
2005	1	17	Martin Hanzal	Czech Republic	LW	673	127	211	338	574	—	—	—	—	—
2005	2	59	Pier Pelletier	Canada	G	—	—	—	—	—	—	—	—	—	—
2005	4	105	Keith Yandle	United States	D	1109	103	516	619	616	—	—	—	—	—
2005	5	148	Anton Krysanov	Russia	C	—	—	—	—	—	—	—	—	—	—
2005	7	212	Patrick Brosnihan	United States	RW	—	—	—	—	—	—	—	—	—	—
2006	1	8	Peter Mueller	United States	C	297	63	97	160	98	—	—	—	—	—
2006	1	29	Chris Summers	United States	D	70	2	7	9	51	—	—	—	—	—
2006	3	88	Jonas Ahnelov	Sweden	D	—	—	—	—	—	—	—	—	—	—
2006	5	130	Brett Bennett	United States	G	—	—	—	—	—	—	—	—	—	—
2006	5	131	Martin Latal	Czech Republic	LW	—	—	—	—	—	—	—	—	—	—
2006	5	152	Jordan Bendfeld	Canada	D	—	—	—	—	—	—	—	—	—	—
2006	7	188	Chris Frank	United States	D	—	—	—	—	—	—	—	—	—	—
2006	7	196	Benn Ferriero	United States	C	98	14	9	23	25	—	—	—	—	—
2007	1	3	Kyle Turris	Canada	C	776	168	257	425	343	—	—	—	—	—
2007	1	30	Nick Ross	Canada	D	—	—	—	—	—	—	—	—	—	—
2007	2	32	Brett MacLean	Canada	LW	18	2	3	5	4	—	—	—	—	—
2007	2	36	Joel Gistedt	Sweden	G	—	—	—	—	—	—	—	—	—	—
2007	4	103	Vladimir Ruzicka	Czech Republic	C	—	—	—	—	—	—	—	—	—	—
2007	5	123	Maxim Goncharov	Russia	D	—	—	—	—	—	—	—	—	—	—
2007	6	153	Scott Darling	United States	G	126	0	0	0	2	54	42	—	18	2.72
2008	1	8	Mikkel Boedker	Denmark	LW	709	118	209	327	116	—	—	—	—	—
2008	1	28	Viktor Tikhonov	Russia	RW	111	11	11	22	40	—	—	—	—	—
2008	2	49	Jared Staal	Canada	RW	2	0	0	0	2	—	—	—	—	—
2008	3	69	Michael Stone	Canada	D	552	41	104	145	309	—	—	—	—	—
2008	3	76	Mathieu Brodeur	Canada	D	—	—	—	—	—	—	—	—	—	—
2008	4	99	Colin Long	United States	C	—	—	—	—	—	—	—	—	—	—
2008	6	159	Brett Hextall	United States	G	—	—	—	—	—	—	—	—	—	—
2008	7	189	Tim Billingsley	Canada	D	—	—	—	—	—	—	—	—	—	—
2009	1	6	Oliver Ekman-Larsson	Sweden	D	1137	156	383	539	754	—	—	—	—	—
2009	2	36	Chris Brown	United States	C	23	2	1	3	21	—	—	—	—	—
2009	3	91	Mike Lee	United States	G	—	—	—	—	—	—	—	—	—	—
2009	4	97	Jordan Szwarz	Canada	RW	50	4	3	7	25	—	—	—	—	—
2009	4	105	Justin Weller	Canada	D	—	—	—	—	—	—	—	—	—	—
2009	6	157	Evan Bloodoff	Canada	LW	—	—	—	—	—	—	—	—	—	—
2010	1	13	Brandon Gormley	Canada	D	58	2	3	5	20	—	—	—	—	—
2010	1	27	Mark Visentin	Canada	G	1	0	0	0	0	0	1	—	0	3.05
2010	2	52	Phil Lane	United States	RW	—	—	—	—	—	—	—	—	—	—
2010	2	57	Oscar Lindberg	Sweden	C	252	39	40	79	117	—	—	—	—	—
2010	5	138	Louis Domingue	Canada	G	144	0	2	2	6	61	60	—	10	3.02
2011	1	20	Connor Murphy	United States	D	825	48	129	177	560	—	—	—	—	—
2011	2	51	Alexander Ruuttu	Finland	F	—	—	—	—	—	—	—	—	—	—
2011	2	56	Lucas Lessio	Canada	LW	41	3	4	7	12	—	—	—	—	—
2011	3	84	Harrison Ruopp	Canada	D	—	—	—	—	—	—	—	—	—	—
2011	4	111	Kale Kessy	Canada	LW	—	—	—	—	—	—	—	—	—	—
2011	5	141	Darian Dziurzynski	Canada	LW	—	—	—	—	—	—	—	—	—	—
2011	6	155	Andrew Fritsch	Canada	RW	—	—	—	—	—	—	—	—	—	—
2011	7	196	Zac Larraza	United States	F	—	—	—	—	—	—	—	—	—	—
2012	1	27	Henrik Samuelsson	United States	C	3	0	0	0	2	—	—	—	—	—
2012	2	58	Jordan Martinook	Canada	C	797	107	155	262	360	—	—	—	—	—
2012	3	88	James Melindy	Canada	D	—	—	—	—	—	—	—	—	—	—
2012	4	102	Rhett Holland	Canada	D	—	—	—	—	—	—	—	—	—	—
2012	5	148	Niklas Tikkinen	Finland	D	—	—	—	—	—	—	—	—	—	—
2012	6	178	Hunter Fejes	United States	LW	—	—	—	—	—	—	—	—	—	—
2012	7	184	Marek Langhamer	Czech Republic	G	2	0	0	0	0	0	0	—	0	1.33
2012	7	208	Justin Hache	Canada	D	—	—	—	—	—	—	—	—	—	—
2013	1	12	Max Domi	Canada	C	815	150	336	486	801	—	—	—	—	—
2013	2	39	Laurent Dauphin	Canada	C	94	8	9	17	53	—	—	—	—	—
2013	3	62	Yan-Pavel Laplante	Canada	C	—	—	—	—	—	—	—	—	—	—
2013	5	133	Connor Clifton	United States	D	434	17	66	83	343	—	—	—	—	—
2013	6	163	Brendan Burke	United States	G	—	—	—	—	—	—	—	—	—	—
2013	7	193	Jedd Soleway	Canada	C	—	—	—	—	—	—	—	—	—	—
2014	1	12	Brendan Perlini	Canada	LW	262	50	31	81	92	—	—	—	—	—
2014	2	43	Ryan MacInnis	United States	C	27	0	1	1	0	—	—	—	—	—
2014	2	58	Christian Dvorak	United States	LW	614	123	177	300	147	—	—	—	—	—
2014	3	87	Anton Karlsson	Canada	RW	—	—	—	—	—	—	—	—	—	—
2014	4	117	Michael Bunting	Canada	LW	418	109	143	252	342	—	—	—	—	—
2014	5	133	Dysin Mayo	Canada	D	85	4	9	13	35	—	—	—	—	—
2014	6	163	David Westlund	Sweden	D	—	—	—	—	—	—	—	—	—	—
2014	7	191	Jared Fiegl	United States	LW	—	—	—	—	—	—	—	—	—	—
2014	7	193	Edgars Kulda	Latvia	LW	—	—	—	—	—	—	—	—	—	—
2015	1	3	Dylan Strome	Canada	C	598	165	277	442	212	—	—	—	—	—
2015	1	30	Nick Merkley	Canada	RW	41	4	11	15	11	—	—	—	—	—
2015	2	32	Christian Fischer	United States	RW	523	62	75	137	144	—	—	—	—	—
2015	3	63	Kyle Capobianco	Canada	D	107	7	10	17	60	—	—	—	—	—
2015	3	76	Adin Hill	Canada	G	213	0	5	5	10	106	73	—	19	2.67
2015	3	81	Brendan Warren	United States	LW	—	—	—	—	—	—	—	—	—	—
2015	3	83	Jens Looke	Sweden	RW	—	—	—	—	—	—	—	—	—	—
2015	5	123	Conor Garland	United States	RW	556	134	190	324	246	—	—	—	—	—
2015	7	183	Erik Kallgren	Sweden	G	24	0	0	0	2	11	6	—	5	3.04
2016	1	7	Clayton Keller	United States	C	683	222	374	596	269	—	—	—	—	—
2016	1	16	Jakob Chychrun	Canada	D	621	122	201	323	422	—	—	—	—	—
2016	3	68	Cam Dineen	United States	D	38	0	7	7	4	—	—	—	—	—
2016	6	158	Patrick Kudla	Canada	D	—	—	—	—	—	—	—	—	—	—
2016	7	188	Dean Stewart	Canada	D	—	—	—	—	—	—	—	—	—	—
2017	1	23	Pierre-Olivier Joseph	Canada	D	225	9	37	46	119	—	—	—	—	—
2017	2	44	Filip Westerlund	Sweden	D	—	—	—	—	—	—	—	—	—	—
2017	3	69	MacKenzie Entwistle	Canada	D	193	15	20	35	86	—	—	—	—	—
2017	3	75	Nate Schnarr	Canada	C	—	—	—	—	—	—	—	—	—	—
2017	3	82	Cameron Crotty	Canada	D	8	0	1	1	0	—	—	—	—	—
2017	4	108	Noel Hoefenmayer	Canada	D	—	—	—	—	—	—	—	—	—	—
2017	5	126	Michael Karow	United States	D	—	—	—	—	—	—	—	—	—	—
2017	5	128	Tyler Steenbergen	Canada	C	—	—	—	—	—	—	—	—	—	—
2017	7	190	Erik Walli-Walterholm	Sweden	RW	—	—	—	—	—	—	—	—	—	—
2018	1	5	Barrett Hayton	Canada	C	358	65	90	155	201	—	—	—	—	—
2018	2	55	Kevin Bahl	Canada	D	297	11	52	63	209	—	—	—	—	—
2018	3	65	Jan Jenik	Czech Republic	RW	24	4	2	6	20	—	—	—	—	—
2018	3	73	Ty Emberson	United States	D	178	5	30	35	47	—	—	—	—	—
2018	4	114	Ivan Prosvetov	Russia	G	24	0	0	0	0	8	9	—	2	3.70
2018	5	142	Michael Callahan	United States	D	22	1	0	1	7	—	—	—	—	—
2018	5	145	Dennis Busby	Canada	D	—	—	—	—	—	—	—	—	—	—
2018	6	158	David Tendeck	Canada	G	—	—	—	—	—	—	—	—	—	—
2018	7	189	Liam Kirk	United Kingdom	LW	—	—	—	—	—	—	—	—	—	—
2019	1	11	Victor Soderstrom	Sweden	D	61	1	11	12	30	—	—	—	—	—
2019	3	76	John Farinacci	United States	C	1	1	0	1	0	—	—	—	—	—
2019	4	98	Matias Maccelli	Finland	LW	295	51	118	169	54	—	—	—	—	—
2019	4	107	Alexandr Darin	Russia	RW	—	—	—	—	—	—	—	—	—	—
2019	5	152	Aku Raty	Finland	RW	1	0	1	1	0	—	—	—	—	—
2019	6	174	Danil Savunov	Russia	LW	—	—	—	—	—	—	—	—	—	—
2019	6	176	Anthony Romano	Canada	C	—	—	—	—	—	—	—	—	—	—
2019	7	200	Axel Bergkvist	Sweden	D	—	—	—	—	—	—	—	—	—	—
2019	7	207	Valentin Nussbaumer	Switzerland	C	—	—	—	—	—	—	—	—	—	—
2020	4	111	Mitchell Miller	United States	D	—	—	—	—	—	—	—	—	—	—
2020	5	142	Carson Bantle	United States	LW	—	—	—	—	—	—	—	—	—	—
2020	6	173	Filip Barklund	Sweden	C	—	—	—	—	—	—	—	—	—	—
2020	7	192	Elliot Ekefjard	Sweden	RW	—	—	—	—	—	—	—	—	—	—
2020	7	204	Ben McCartney	Canada	LW	2	0	0	0	4	—	—	—	—	—
2021	1	9	Dylan Guenther	Canada	RW	227	91	92	183	78	—	—	—	—	—
2021	2	37	Josh Doan	United States	RW	144	37	43	80	33	—	—	—	—	—
2021	2	43	Ilya Fedotov	Russia	LW	—	—	—	—	—	—	—	—	—	—
2021	2	60	Janis Moser	Switzerland	D	338	25	90	115	177	—	—	—	—	—
2021	4	107	Emil Martinsen-Lilleberg	Norway	D	163	5	31	36	182	—	—	—	—	—
2021	4	122	Rasmus Korhonen	Finland	G	—	—	—	—	—	—	—	—	—	—
2021	5	139	Manix Landry	Canada	C	—	—	—	—	—	—	—	—	—	—
2021	6	171	Cal Thomas	United States	D	—	—	—	—	—	—	—	—	—	—
2021	7	223	Sam Lipkin	United States	C	—	—	—	—	—	—	—	—	—	—
2022	1	3	Logan Cooley	United States	C	211	69	83	152	92	—	—	—	—	—
2022	1	11	Conor Geekie	Canada	C	66	9	8	17	24	—	—	—	—	—
2022	1	29	Maveric Lamoureux	Canada	D	20	1	3	4	44	—	—	—	—	—
2022	2	36	Artem Duda	Russia	D	—	—	—	—	—	—	—	—	—	—
2022	2	43	Julian Lutz	Germany	LW	—	—	—	—	—	—	—	—	—	—
2022	3	67	Miko Matikka	Finland	RW	—	—	—	—	—	—	—	—	—	—
2022	3	94	Jeremy Langlois	Canada	D	—	—	—	—	—	—	—	—	—	—
2022	5	131	Matthew Morden	Canada	D	—	—	—	—	—	—	—	—	—	—
2022	6	163	Maksymilian Szuber	Germany	D	1	0	0	0	2	—	—	—	—	—
2022	7	204	Adam Zlnka	Slovakia	RW	—	—	—	—	—	—	—	—	—	—
2023	1	6	Dmitriy Simashev	Russia	D	28	0	1	1	23	—	—	—	—	—
2023	1	12	Daniil But	Russia	LW	29	3	4	7	8	—	—	—	—	—
2023	2	38	Michael Hrabal	Czech Republic	G	—	—	—	—	—	—	—	—	—	—
2023	3	70	Jonathan Castagna	Canada	C	—	—	—	—	—	—	—	—	—	—
2023	3	72	Noel Nordh	Sweden	LW	—	—	—	—	—	—	—	—	—	—
2023	3	81	Tanner Ludtke	United States	C	—	—	—	—	—	—	—	—	—	—
2023	3	88	Vadim Moroz	Belarus	RW	—	—	—	—	—	—	—	—	—	—
2023	4	102	Terrell Goldsmith	Canada	D	—	—	—	—	—	—	—	—	—	—
2023	5	134	Melker Thelin	Sweden	G	—	—	—	—	—	—	—	—	—	—
2023	5	160	Justin Kipkie	Canada	D	—	—	—	—	—	—	—	—	—	—
2023	6	162	Samu Bau	Finland	C	—	—	—	—	—	—	—	—	—	—
2023	6	166	Carsen Musser	United States	G	—	—	—	—	—	—	—	—	—	—

== See also ==
- List of Utah Mammoth draft picks
