= Maveric Lamoureux =

Canadian ice hockey player (born 2004)

- Born: January 13, 2004 (age 22) Laval, Quebec, Canada
- Height: 6 ft 6 in (198 cm)
- Weight: 196 lb (89 kg; 14 st 0 lb)
- Position: Defence
- Shoots: Right
- NHL team: Utah Mammoth
- NHL draft: 29th overall, 2022; Arizona Coyotes
- Playing career: 2024–present

Maveric Lamoureux (born January 13, 2004) is a Canadian professional ice hockey player who is a defenceman for the Utah Mammoth of the National Hockey League (NHL). Lamoureux was drafted 29th overall by the Arizona Coyotes in the 2022 NHL entry draft.

== Playing career ==
On August 17, 2022, Lamoureux signed a three-year, entry-level contract with the Arizona Coyotes. On October 23, 2024, the Utah Mammoth (the then Utah Hockey Club) recalled him from the American Hockey League (AHL) affiliate, the Tucson Roadrunners. On October 24, Lamoureux made his NHL debut in Utah's 5–1 loss against the Colorado Avalanche. He scored his first NHL goal in a 5–1 win against the Calgary Flames on October 30, and recorded his first NHL assist the next game, on November 2, in a 4–3 overtime loss to the Vegas Golden Knights. Lamoureux recorded one goal and two assists in 15 games for Utah before sustaining an upper-body injury that would keep him away from playing for four to six weeks.

== Career statistics ==
=== Regular season and playoffs ===
			Regular season					Playoffs
Season	Team	League	GP	G	A	Pts	PIM	GP	G	A	Pts	PIM
2019–20	Jonquière Élites	QMAAA	38	2	12	14	54	—	—	—	—	—
2020–21	Drummondville Voltigeurs	QMJHL	24	1	6	7	26	3	0	0	0	0
2021–22	Drummondville Voltigeurs	QMJHL	54	4	20	24	69	4	0	1	1	4
2022–23	Drummondville Voltigeurs	QMJHL	35	5	14	19	62	9	2	4	6	16
2023–24	Drummondville Voltigeurs	QMJHL	39	9	24	33	53	—	—	—	—	—
2024–25	Tucson Roadrunners	AHL	42	2	11	13	48	3	0	0	0	0
2024–25	Utah Hockey Club	NHL	15	1	2	3	42	—	—	—	—	—
2025–26	Tucson Roadrunners	AHL	65	5	15	20	75	—	—	—	—	—
2025–26	Utah Mammoth	NHL	5	0	1	1	2	—	—	—	—	—
NHL totals			20	1	3	4	44	—	—	—	—	—

=== International ===
Year	Team	Event	Result	GP	G	A	Pts	PIM
2024	Canada	WJC	5th	5	1	2	3	0
Junior totals				5	1	2	3	0

Awards and achievements
Preceded by Conor Geekie	Arizona Coyotes first-round draft pick 2022	Succeeded by Dmitriy Simashev
