= Dylan Guenther =

Canadian ice hockey player (born 2003)

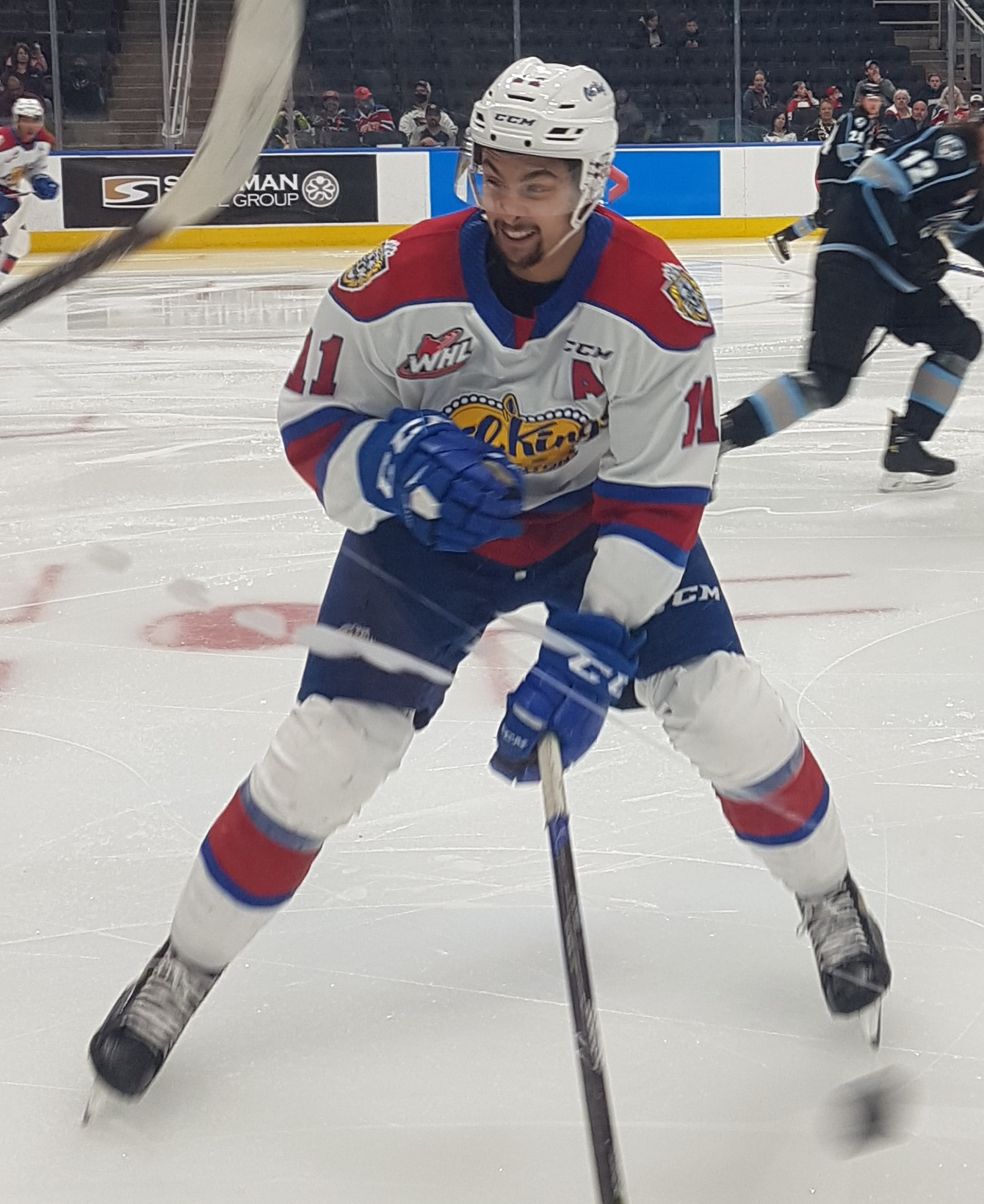
- Guenther with the Edmonton Oil Kings in 2022
- Born: April 10, 2003 (age 23) Edmonton, Alberta, Canada
- Height: 6 ft 2 in (188 cm)
- Weight: 180 lb (82 kg; 12 st 12 lb)
- Position: Right wing
- Shoots: Right
- NHL team Former teams: Utah Mammoth; Arizona Coyotes
- National team: Canada
- NHL draft: 9th overall, 2021; Arizona Coyotes
- Playing career: 2022–present

Dylan Guenther (born April 10, 2003) is a Canadian professional ice hockey player who is a right winger for the Utah Mammoth of the National Hockey League (NHL). He was selected by the Arizona Coyotes with the ninth overall pick in the 2021 NHL entry draft.

== Playing career ==
The Edmonton Oil Kings of the Western Hockey League (WHL) selected Guenther with the first pick of the 2018 WHL bantam draft. He debuted with the Oil Kings late in the 2018–19 season, scoring three goals and four points in his first eight WHL games. Guenther finished third on the Oil Kings in scoring in 2019–20, amassing 59 points (including a team-leading 26 goals) in 58 games. As a result, Guenther was awarded the WHL's Jim Piggott Memorial Trophy as WHL rookie of the year. During the pandemic-shortened 2020–21 season, Guenther scored 12 goals and 24 points in just 12 games. Guenther was awarded the Central Division's Player of the Year award and Most Sportsmanlike Player.

The NHL Central Scouting Bureau ranked Guenther as the fifth-best North American skater eligible for the 2021 NHL entry draft. On July 24, 2021, the Arizona Coyotes selected Guenther with the ninth overall pick in the 2021 draft; the pick was acquired in a trade with the Vancouver Canucks. He was later signed to a three-year, entry-level contract with the Coyotes on August 31.

In the 2021–22 WHL season, Guenther led the Oil Kings with 45 goals and 91 points. In the subsequent playoffs, Guenther again led the Oil Kings with 13 goals and 21 points, as they won the Ed Chynoweth Cup. He was also named to the WHL's Central Division First All-Star Team.

Guenther began the 2022–23 NHL season with the Coyotes and made his NHL debut on October 15, 2022 in a 6–3 loss to the Boston Bruins. He had a breakaway saved by Jeremy Swayman but registered an assist in his first game on a goal by Josh Brown. Guenther scored his first NHL goal on October 22 against Anton Forsberg in a 6–2 loss to the Ottawa Senators. Guenther played in 39 games with Arizona. On January 10, 2023, the Seattle Thunderbirds acquired Guenther's WHL playing rights in exchange for seven draft picks. He was assigned to the Thunderbirds on February 5, 2023. Guenther was assigned to the Thunderbirds at the 39-game mark due to a regulation that stated if a player played in 40 games, it would count as a year towards unrestricted free agency. In the 2022–23 WHL season, Guenther played 20 regular season games with Seattle, recording 29 points. In the 2023 playoffs, Guenther led the Thunderbirds with 16 goals and 28 points, winning the Ed Chynoweth Cup for the second consecutive season. The Thunderbirds reached the final of the 2023 Memorial Cup, but were defeated by the Quebec Remparts.

Guenther attended the Coyotes' 2023 training camp, but was assigned to Arizona's American Hockey League affiliate, the Tucson Roadrunners, to begin the 2023–24 season. Guenther was recalled by Arizona on January 6, 2024 after Jason Zucker was suspended. At the time, he was leading the Roadrunners in scoring with 10 goals and 18 assists in 29 games played. Guenther made his season debut with the Coyotes on January 7, scoring one of the team's two goals in a 6–2 loss to the Winnipeg Jets. He was judged to have performed sufficiently well that when Zucker was able to return to the roster, Guenther remained with the team. With the Coyotes announced as relocating to Utah following the conclusion of the NHL season (though the franchise was treated as inactive, with the Utah Hockey Club being an expansion franchise), Guenther scored the team's penultimate goal in Arizona in its season-ending 5–2 victory over the Edmonton Oilers on April 17, before being transferred along with the rest of the Coyotes personnel to the new Utah franchise.

Before the start of 2024–25 NHL season, Guenther signed an eight-year, $57 million contract extension with Utah, beginning in the 2025–26 NHL season. In Utah's season opener, on October 8, 2024, Guenther scored the first goal in franchise history against the Chicago Blackhawks. He scored his second goal for the franchise on an empty net late in the third period of Utah's 5–2 inaugural win over Chicago.

== International play ==
Medal record

Representing Canada

Men's ice hockey

World Junior Championships
| Gold medal – first place | 2023 Canada | |

World U18 Championships
| Gold medal – first place | 2021 Canada | |

Guenther made his international debut for Canada as a member of the national under-18 team at the 2021 IIHF World U18 Championships. Serving as an alternate captain, he registered three goals and four assists, helping Team Canada win the championship.

On December 12, 2022, Guenther was named to the national junior team for the 2023 World Junior Ice Hockey Championships. During the tournament, he recorded seven goals and three assists in seven games. He scored two goals in the gold medal game against the Czech Republic, including the winning goal in overtime.

Following the end of the 2023–24 NHL season, with the Coyotes not qualifying for the 2024 Stanley Cup playoffs, Guenther accepted an invitation to make his senior national team debut at the 2024 IIHF World Championship.

== Career statistics ==
=== Regular season and playoffs ===
| | | | Regular season | | | | | Playoffs |
| Season | Team | League | GP | G | A | Pts | PIM | GP | G | A | Pts | PIM |
|---|---|---|---|---|---|---|---|---|---|---|---|---|
| 2018–19 | Edmonton Oil Kings | WHL | 8 | 3 | 1 | 4 | 0 | 3 | 0 | 0 | 0 | 0 |
| 2019–20 | Edmonton Oil Kings | WHL | 58 | 26 | 33 | 59 | 22 | — | — | — | — | — |
| 2020–21 | Sherwood Park Crusaders | AJHL | 4 | 3 | 2 | 5 | 12 | — | — | — | — | — |
| 2020–21 | Edmonton Oil Kings | WHL | 12 | 12 | 12 | 24 | 2 | — | — | — | — | — |
| 2021–22 | Edmonton Oil Kings | WHL | 59 | 45 | 46 | 91 | 45 | 16 | 13 | 8 | 21 | 10 |
| 2022–23 | Arizona Coyotes | NHL | 33 | 6 | 9 | 15 | 10 | — | — | — | — | — |
| 2022–23 | Seattle Thunderbirds | WHL | 20 | 13 | 16 | 29 | 18 | 19 | 16 | 12 | 28 | 12 |
| 2023–24 | Tucson Roadrunners | AHL | 29 | 10 | 18 | 28 | 20 | 2 | 1 | 0 | 1 | 0 |
| 2023–24 | Arizona Coyotes | NHL | 45 | 18 | 17 | 35 | 14 | — | — | — | — | — |
| 2024–25 | Utah Hockey Club | NHL | 70 | 27 | 33 | 60 | 26 | — | — | — | — | — |
| 2025–26 | Utah Mammoth | NHL | 79 | 40 | 33 | 73 | 28 | 6 | 3 | 2 | 5 | 2 |
| NHL totals | | | 227 | 91 | 92 | 183 | 78 | 6 | 3 | 2 | 5 | 2 |

=== International ===
| Year | Team | Event | Result | GP | G | A | Pts | PIM |
|---|---|---|---|---|---|---|---|---|
| 2019 | Canada White | U17 | 4th | 6 | 3 | 0 | 3 | 2 |
| 2021 | Canada | U18 | 1st place, gold medalist(s) | 7 | 4 | 3 | 7 | 0 |
| 2023 | Canada | WJC | 1st place, gold medalist(s) | 7 | 7 | 3 | 10 | 4 |
| 2024 | Canada | WC | 4th | 9 | 1 | 3 | 4 | 0 |
| Junior totals | | | | 20 | 14 | 6 | 20 | 6 |
| Senior totals | | | | 9 | 1 | 3 | 4 | 0 |

== Awards and achievements ==
| Award | Year | Ref |
WHL
| Jim Piggott Memorial Trophy | 2020 | |
| Ed Chynoweth Cup champion | 2022, 2023 | |

== Records ==
=== Utah Mammoth ===
==== Career ====
- First goal in franchise history (October 8, 2024)
- First overtime goal in franchise history (October 10, 2024)
- Most career goals (67)
- Most career power-play goals (21)
- Most career overtime goals (6)
- Most career overtime points (9)

==== Season ====
- Most power-play goals in a season (12, in 2024-25)
- Most game-winning goals in a season (9, in 2024-25)
- Most goals in a season (40, in 2025-26)

==== Game ====
- Most assists in a period (3, in 2025-26)

Awards and achievements
| Preceded by Victor Söderström | Arizona Coyotes' first-round draft pick 2021 | Succeeded by Logan Cooley |
