= Daniil But =

Russian ice hockey player (born 2005)

- Born: 15 February 2005 (age 21) Yaroslavl, Russia
- Height: 6 ft 5 in (196 cm)
- Weight: 203 lb (92 kg; 14 st 7 lb)
- Position: Winger
- Shoots: Right
- NHL team Former teams: Utah Mammoth; Lokomotiv Yaroslavl
- NHL draft: 12th overall, 2023; Arizona Coyotes
- Playing career: 2023–present

Daniil Antonovich But (Russian: Даниил Антонович Бут; born 15 February 2005) is a Russian professional ice hockey player who is a winger for the Utah Mammoth of the National Hockey League (NHL). He was drafted 12th overall by the Arizona Coyotes in the 2023 NHL entry draft.

== Playing career ==
But played in 81 Junior Hockey League (MHL) games for Lokomotiv Yaroslavl from 2021 to 2023, recording 35 goals and 41 assists. During the 2022–23 season he made his professional debut with Yaroslavl's Kontinental Hockey League (KHL) club, and recorded two goals in 15 games while also appearing in one playoff game.

In his first full season in the KHL in 2024–25, But established new career highs in posting 28 points through 54 regular season games. He featured in 13 playoff contest to help Lokomotiv Yaroslavl capture the Gagarin Cup, their first in franchise history.

Having concluded his contract with Lokomotiv Yaroslavl, But was signed to a three-year, entry-level contract with the Utah Mammoth of the National Hockey League on 28 May 2025.

== Career statistics ==
=== Regular season and playoffs ===
			Regular season					Playoffs
Season	Team	League	GP	G	A	Pts	PIM	GP	G	A	Pts	PIM
2021–22	Loko Yaroslavl	MHL	46	17	25	42	28	7	0	0	0	2
2022–23	Loko Yaroslavl	MHL	26	15	11	26	22	7	4	5	9	9
2022–23	Lokomotiv Yaroslavl	KHL	15	2	0	2	6	1	0	0	0	0
2023–24	Loko Yaroslavl	MHL	3	1	2	3	2	1	0	1	1	0
2023–24	Lokomotiv Yaroslavl	KHL	55	10	11	21	10	19	1	1	2	0
2024–25	Lokomotiv Yaroslavl	KHL	54	9	19	28	16	13	0	1	1	0
2025–26	Tucson Roadrunners	AHL	41	19	20	39	38	—	—	—	—	—
2025–26	Utah Mammoth	NHL	29	3	4	7	8	—	—	—	—	—
KHL totals			124	21	30	51	32	33	1	2	3	0
NHL totals			29	3	4	7	8	—	—	—	—	—

=== International ===
Year	Team	Event	Result	GP	G	A	Pts	PIM
2021	Russia	HG18	1st place, gold medalist(s)	5	0	1	1	0
Junior totals				5	0	1	1	0

== Awards and honours ==
Award	Year	Ref
MHL
All-Star Game	2023	
KHL
Gagarin Cup champion	2025	

Awards and achievements
Preceded by Dmitriy Simashev	Arizona Coyotes first-round draft pick 2023	Succeeded by none
