= Dmitriy Simashev =

Russian ice hockey player (born 2005)

- Born: 4 February 2005 (age 21) Kostroma, Russia
- Height: 6 ft 4 in (193 cm)
- Weight: 201 lb (91 kg; 14 st 5 lb)
- Position: Defence
- Shoots: Left
- NHL team Former teams: Utah Mammoth; Lokomotiv Yaroslavl
- NHL draft: 6th overall, 2023; Arizona Coyotes
- Playing career: 2022–present

Dmitriy Olegovich Simashev (Russian: Дмитрий Олегович Симашев; born 4 February 2005) is a Russian professional ice hockey player who is a defenceman for the Utah Mammoth of the National Hockey League (NHL). He was drafted sixth overall by the Arizona Coyotes, the Mammoth's previous incarnation, in the 2023 NHL entry draft. Prior to joining the NHL, he played in the Kontinental Hockey League (KHL) for Lokomotiv Yaroslavl, with whom he won a Gagarin Cup championship in 2025.

== Playing career ==
During the 2021–22 season, he played the entire season and shared the second-most points among Yaroslavl Jr. defenceman with five goals and 11 assists in 46 games. During the 2022–23 season he made his professional debut with Yaroslavl's KHL club, where he was scoreless in 18 games.

In his second full season in the KHL in 2024–25, Simashev as a fixture on Lokomotiv's blueline registered 1 goal and 6 points through 56 regular season games. He featured in 21 playoff contests to help Lokomotiv capture the Gagarin Cup, their first in franchise history.

Having concluded his contract with Lokomotiv, Simashev was signed to a three-year, entry-level contract with the Utah Mammoth of the National Hockey League (NHL) on 28 May 2025. Simashev earned his first NHL point on 5 November, in a 5–3 loss to the Toronto Maple Leafs when he assisted on a goal that was scored by his fellow countryman Mikhail Sergachev.

== Career statistics ==
			Regular season					Playoffs
Season	Team	League	GP	G	A	Pts	PIM	GP	G	A	Pts	PIM
2021–22	Loko Yaroslavl	MHL	46	5	11	16	20	2	0	1	1	0
2022–23	Loko Yaroslavl	MHL	29	1	9	10	39	10	2	4	6	6
2022–23	Lokomotiv Yaroslavl	KHL	18	0	0	0	2	—	—	—	—	—
2023–24	Loko Yaroslavl	MHL	1	1	0	1	0	1	0	1	1	0
2023–24	Lokomotiv Yaroslavl	KHL	63	4	6	10	18	17	0	1	1	6
2024–25	Lokomotiv Yaroslavl	KHL	56	1	5	6	4	21	0	1	1	2
2025–26	Utah Mammoth	NHL	28	0	1	1	23	—	—	—	—	—
2025–26	Tucson Roadrunners	AHL	40	8	27	35	31	—	—	—	—	—
KHL totals			137	5	11	16	24	38	0	2	2	8
NHL totals			28	0	1	1	23	—	—	—	—	—

== Awards and honours ==
Award	Year	Ref
KHL
Gagarin Cup champion	2025	

Awards and achievements
Preceded by Maveric Lamoureux	Arizona Coyotes first-round draft pick 2023	Succeeded by Daniil But
