= Peter Miller =

Peter or Pete Miller may refer to:

== Arts and entertainment ==
- P. Schuyler Miller (1912–1974), American science fiction writer and critic
- Peter Miller (artist) (1913–1996), American surrealist painter
- Peter Miller (musician) (born 1942), English singer, songwriter and record producer
- Peter Miller (actor) (born 1969), Canadian actor

== Sports ==
=== Association football (soccer) ===
- Peter Miller (footballer, born 1858) (1858–1914), Scottish football (soccer) player
- Peter Miller (footballer, born 1908) (1908–1979), Scottish football (soccer) player
- Peter Miller (footballer, born 1929) (1929–2012), English footballer

=== Other sports ===
- Pete Miller (basketball) (born 1952) American basketball player
- Peter Miller (horse trainer) (born 1966), American horse racing trainer
- Peter Miller (Australian footballer) (born 1969), Australian rules footballer
- Peter Miller (angler), American professional angler

== Others ==
- Peter Miller (software engineer) (1960–2014), Australian software developer
- Peter N. Miller (born 1964), American intellectual historian
- Peter G. Miller, American journalist and author

== See also ==
- Peter Miller Cunningham (1789–1864), Scottish naval surgeon and pioneer in Australia
- Peter Millar (disambiguation)
