= Peter Mueller (ice hockey) =

American ice hockey player (born 1988)

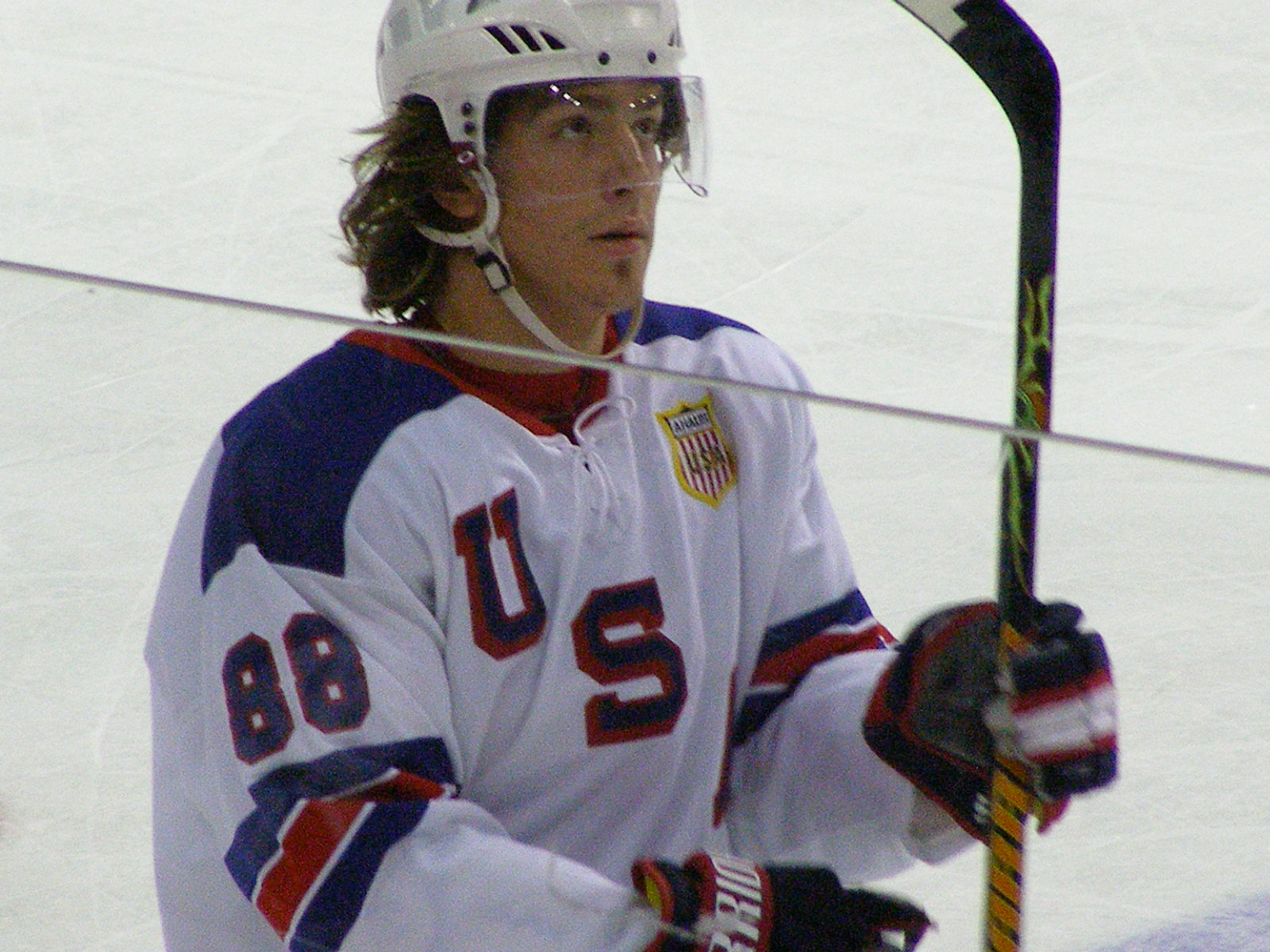
- Mueller in 2008
- Born: April 14, 1988 (age 38) Bloomington, Minnesota, U.S.
- Height: 6 ft 2 in (188 cm)
- Weight: 204 lb (93 kg; 14 st 8 lb)
- Position: Center
- Shot: Right
- Played for: Phoenix Coyotes; Colorado Avalanche; Florida Panthers; Kloten Flyers; Malmö Redhawks; EC Red Bull Salzburg; HC Kometa Brno; HC Vítkovice; Grizzlys Wolfsburg
- National team: United States
- NHL draft: 8th overall, 2006; Phoenix Coyotes
- Playing career: 2007–2025

Peter Randy Mueller (born April 14, 1988) is an American former professional ice hockey forward. He played in the National Hockey League (NHL) with the Phoenix Coyotes, Colorado Avalanche and the Florida Panthers.

== Playing career ==
Mueller was drafted 8th overall by the Phoenix Coyotes in the 2006 NHL entry draft. He plays as a center. He played in the USA Hockey developmental program for the 2004–05 season before moving to the Western Hockey League's Everett Silvertips. Because of his outstanding performances in the first half of the 2007–08 season, Mueller was selected to play in the 2008 NHL YoungStars Game in Atlanta. He netted his first career NHL hat-trick against the Anaheim Ducks on November 7, 2007.

Mueller's 2008–09 season was a small disappointment as he couldn't replicate his 54 point performance of 2007–08, recording 36 points in 72 games.

In the 2009–10 season, Mueller's production further sagged, leading to a request to be traded. Mueller scored 17 points in 54 games before on March 12, 2010, he was traded by the Coyotes, along with Kevin Porter, to the Colorado Avalanche for Wojtek Wolski. Later that day Mueller made his Avalanche debut, scoring a goal in a 4–3 victory over the Anaheim Ducks. In just 15 games with the Avs, after a 5–4 overtime victory against the San Jose Sharks in which he scored two goals and an assist, Mueller had already eclipsed his offensive production he managed to register with the Coyotes for the entire season before the trade.

On September 10, 2010, the Avalanche signed Mueller to a two year, $4 million deal. He suffered a concussion in an Avalanche regular season game against San Jose late in the 2010 season. He suffered it as a result of a hard check by former Avalanche defenseman, Rob Blake. He suffered another concussion in the last week of the 2010–11 preseason and was put on injured reserve.

Mueller made an anticipated return after a year of absence in the beginning of the 2011–12 season, but post-concussion syndromes forced him to the IR again. On November 25, 2011 it was reported that Mueller, who has been dealing with post-concussion symptoms, now had a groin injury as well. On January 12, 2012, he made another return in a 3–2 OT loss against the Nashville Predators. He scored his first points in almost 2 years on January 18, when he scored two goals and added an assist against the Florida Panthers in a 4–3 OT win.

At the conclusion of his two-year contract with the Avalanche, in which both were decimated by injury, Mueller failed to receive a qualifying offer prior to the opening of NHL free agency on July 1, 2012, making him an unrestricted free agent. On July 11, 2012 Mueller signed a one-year, $1.725 million contract with the Florida Panthers.

Despite a lockout shortened 2012–13 season, Mueller returned to full health for the first time since 2010, and featured in 43 games. After initially succeeding on a scoring line alongside eventual Calder Memorial Trophy winner, Jonathan Huberdeau and veteran Alexei Kovalev, Mueller slowed in his offensive output to finish with 8 goals and 17 points with the Panthers.

Unable to agree on a new contract with Florida, and with limited NHL interest, Mueller signed his first European contract on a one-year deal with Swiss club, Kloten Flyers of the National League A on September 6, 2013. In the 2013–14 season, Mueller played a full season to lead the club and finish third in NLA scoring with 46 points. At the conclusion of the season, Mueller accepted an invitation and played for the U.S. at the 2014 IIHF World Championships in Belarus.

In March 2014, Mueller stated in an interview that he is interested in returning to the NHL following his stay in Switzerland with the Flyers. On July 29, 2014, Mueller and the St. Louis Blues agreed to terms on a one-year, two-way contract. On October 8, 2014, after failing to make the Blues roster, Mueller and the club announced the termination of his contract so he could explore his options to play in Europe. On October 10, 2014, Mueller expectedly returned to his previous club in signing a one-year contract with the Kloten Flyers. On March 20, 2015, the Kloten Flyers decided not to offer him a contract extension after tailing only 17 points in the 2014–15 NLA season.

On August 12, 2015, Mueller remained in Europe as a free agent, and signed a one-year deal with Swedish club, Malmö Redhawks of the Swedish Hockey League. In the 2015–16 season, Mueller quickly adapted to the Swedish League and contributed offensively with 13 goals and 25 points in 43 games with the Redhawks.

On September 7, 2016, Mueller as a free agent agreed to another attempt to re-ignite his NHL career in signing a professional try-out with the Boston Bruins, expected to attend their training camp at Warrior Ice Arena in Boston, Massachusetts. On October 2, 2016, Mueller was released from his try-out contract with Boston, however he accepted an offer with AHL affiliate, the Providence Bruins to begin the 2016–17 season on a professional try-out contract. He played the entirety of season with Providence, collecting 13 goals and 25 points in 56 games.

As a free agent the following off-season, Mueller returned to Europe in belatedly signing a one-year deal with Austrian outfit, EC Red Bull Salzburg of the EBEL, on September 20, 2017.

Mueller played the last 8 seasons of his professional career abroad, most notably with HC Kometa Brno in the Czech Extraliga, before announcing his retirement after 18 years on July 27, 2025.

== Career statistics ==
=== Regular season and playoffs ===
			Regular season					Playoffs
Season	Team	League	GP	G	A	Pts	PIM	GP	G	A	Pts	PIM
2003–04	U.S. NTDP U17	USDP	17	4	9	13	25	—	—	—	—	—
2003–04	U.S. NTDP U18	NAHL	43	10	16	26	26	7	3	2	5	4
2004–05	U.S. NTDP U18	NAHL	14	11	13	24	16	—	—	—	—	—
2004–05	U.S. NTDP U18	USDP	43	27	27	54	75	—	—	—	—	—
2005–06	Everett Silvertips	WHL	52	26	32	58	44	15	7	6	13	10
2006–07	Everett Silvertips	WHL	51	21	57	78	45	12	7	9	16	12
2007–08	Phoenix Coyotes	NHL	81	22	32	54	32	—	—	—	—	—
2008–09	Phoenix Coyotes	NHL	72	13	23	36	24	—	—	—	—	—
2009–10	Phoenix Coyotes	NHL	54	4	13	17	8	—	—	—	—	—
2009–10	Colorado Avalanche	NHL	15	9	11	20	8	—	—	—	—	—
2011–12	Colorado Avalanche	NHL	32	7	9	16	8	—	—	—	—	—
2012–13	Florida Panthers	NHL	43	8	9	17	18	—	—	—	—	—
2013–14	Kloten Flyers	NLA	49	24	22	46	12	10	2	1	3	4
2014–15	Kloten Flyers	NLA	34	10	7	17	12	—	—	—	—	—
2015–16	Malmö Redhawks	SHL	43	13	12	25	16	—	—	—	—	—
2016–17	Providence Bruins	AHL	56	13	12	25	20	11	1	2	3	2
2017–18	EC Red Bull Salzburg	EBEL	38	14	28	42	18	19	5	14	19	10
2018–19	HC Kometa Brno	ELH	43	24	24	45	42	10	6	3	9	4
2019–20	HC Kometa Brno	ELH	33	14	24	38	24	—	—	—	—	—
2020–21	HC Kometa Brno	ELH	46	29	35	64	14	9	3	2	5	4
2021–22	HC Kometa Brno	ELH	48	23	32	55	14	4	3	3	6	8
2022–23	HC Vítkovice Ridera	ELH	36	18	17	35	6	13	3	5	8	0
2023–24	HC Vítkovice Ridera	ELH	17	6	7	13	4	—	—	—	—	—
2023–24	Grizzlys Wolfsburg	DEL	18	7	9	16	4	4	0	2	2	2
2024–25	HC Kometa Brno	ELH	36	18	18	36	4	20	7	6	13	8
NHL totals			297	63	97	160	98	—	—	—	—	—
ELH totals			259	132	154	286	108	56	22	19	41	24

=== International ===
Medal record

Ice hockey

Representing United States

World Junior Championships
Bronze medal – third place	2007 Sweden	

IIHF World U18 Championship
Gold medal – first place	2005 Czech Republic	

Year	Team	Event	Result	GP	G	A	Pts	PIM
2004	United States	U17	4th	5	0	5	5	2
2005	United States	WJC18	1st place, gold medalist(s)	6	4	3	7	20
2006	United States	WJC	4th	7	2	4	6	26
2007	United States	WJC	3rd place, bronze medalist(s)	7	3	3	6	8
2008	United States	WC	6th	7	0	4	4	0
2014	United States	WC	6th	8	1	3	4	2
Junior totals				25	9	15	24	56
Senior totals				15	1	7	8	2

== Awards and honors ==
Award	Year	Ref
WHL
Jim Piggott Memorial Trophy	2005–06	
Top Draft Prospect Award	2005–06	
West First All-Star Team	2007	
NHL
NHL YoungStars Game	2007–08	

Awards and achievements
Preceded by Martin Hanzal	Phoenix Coyotes first-round draft pick 2006	Succeeded by Chris Summers
