= Peter Müller (footballer, born 1948) =

West German footballer

Personal information
- Date of birth: 11 October 1948 (age 78)
- Position: Midfielder

Senior career*
Years	Team	Apps	(Gls)
1972–1977	VfR Neuss		
1977–1982	1. FC Bocholt		
1982–?	SC Bocholt 1926		
- * Club domestic league appearances and goals

Peter Müller (born 11 October 1948) is a retired West German football midfielder.
