= Peter Müller (footballer, born 1969) =

German footballer

Personal information
- Date of birth: 15 December 1969 (age 56)
- Height: 1.86 m (6 ft 1 in)
- Position: Forward

Senior career*
Years	Team	Apps	(Gls)
1990–1991	K.R.C. Mechelen		
1991–1992	1. FC Köln		
1992–1994	FC Homburg		
- * Club domestic league appearances and goals

Peter Müller (born 15 December 1969) is a German former professional footballer who played as a forward.
