= Peter Müller (footballer, born 1946) =

East German footballer

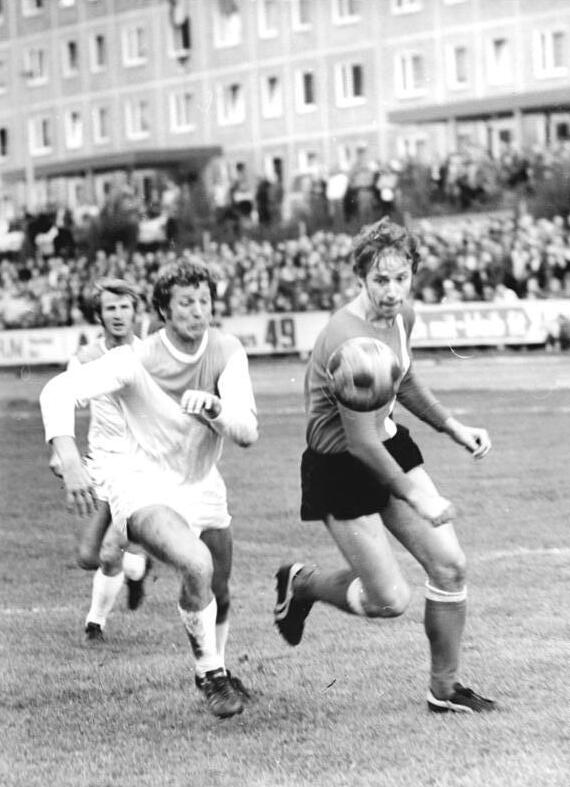
- Peter Müller (right) in 1976

Personal information
- Date of birth: 3 October 1946
- Place of birth: Auerbach
- Date of death: 14 August 2026 (aged 79)
- Height: 1.71 m (5 ft 7 in)
- Position: Midfielder

Senior career*
Years	Team	Apps	(Gls)
1965–1980	FC Karl-Marx-Stadt		
- * Club domestic league appearances and goals

Peter Müller (3 October 1946 – 14 August 2026) was a East German football midfielder.
