= Peter Millar =

Peter or Pete Millar may refer to:

- Peter Millar (footballer) (1951–2013), Scottish footballer of the 1970s and 1980s
- Peter Millar (journalist) (1955–2023), British journalist, critic and author
- Peter Millar (soccer), Scottish-American soccer player of the 1960s and 1970s
- Pete Millar (cartoonist) (1929–2003), American illustrator, cartoonist and drag racer
- Peter Millar (RAF officer) (born 1942), British air marshal
- Peter Millar (clothing company), American clothing brand

== See also ==
- Peter Miller (disambiguation)
