= Bill Adair (journalist) =

American journalist

- Adair in 2026
- Education: Arizona State University (BS)
- Occupations: Founder, professor, editor
- Known for: PolitiFact
- Awards: Pulitzer Prize for National Reporting (shared); Manship Prize for New Media in Democratic Discourse; Everett Dirksen Award for Distinguished Coverage of Congress

Bill Adair is the founder of the fact-checking website PolitiFact and Knight Professor of the Practice of Journalism and Public Policy at Duke University. He specializes in journalism and new media, with an emphasis on structured journalism and fact-checking. He is a former adjunct faculty member at the Poynter Institute in St. Petersburg, Florida and a contributing editor at PolitiFact.

== Early life ==
Adair was born in 1961 or 1962 and is from Philadelphia, Pennsylvania. He earned a Bachelor of Science degree in political science from Arizona State University in 1985, where he worked at a TV station, and the Phoenix Gazette and Tempe Daily News. Adair's first job was in public relations.

== Journalism career ==
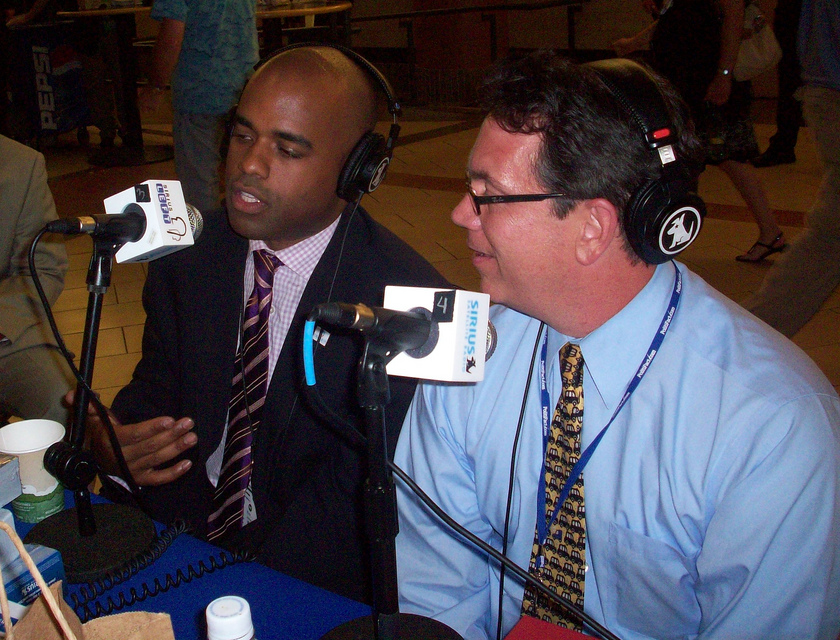
Bill Adair (right) with Jamal Simmons at the 2008 Democratic National Convention

Within roughly a year of graduating, Adair found work for the Fairfax Journal near Washington, D.C. In 1989, he was hired to work for the St. Petersburg Times now the (Tampa Bay Times) where he served as a reporter and editor. Adair's first position was reporting on general news for the Clearwater Times, North Pinella Times, and Largo-Seminole Times. In 1997, he was assigned to the Washington bureau where he covered Congress, the White House, the Supreme Court, national politics, and aviation safety. Adair was involved in covering various political campaigns, including the presidential campaigns of Al Gore in 2000 and George W. Bush in 2004.

In 2004, he was appointed Washington bureau chief, a position he held until his transition into academia in 2013. In 2002, Adair's experience in covering aviation safety led him to author and publish The Mystery of Flight 427: Inside a Crash Investigation, a behind-the-scenes account of a National Transportation Safety Board investigation of the crash of a US Air Boeing 737 near Pittsburgh. In writing the book, Adair was granted access to the five-year inquiry by the National Transportation Safety Board (NTSB).

In 2007, Adair launched PolitiFact, a national fact-checking site that has expanded to include 11 state-level sites and has served as a model for the proliferation of fact-checking sites across the globe. He had originally launched it as a pilot project of the Tampa Bay Times. PolitiFact is known for its "Truth-O-Meter," which rates officials' public statements on a scale ranging from "True" to "Pants On Fire." In 2009, the PolitiFact team was awarded the Pulitzer Prize for National Reporting. Supported by the Knight Foundation, Adair also created the Settle It! PolitiFact's Argument Ender mobile app.

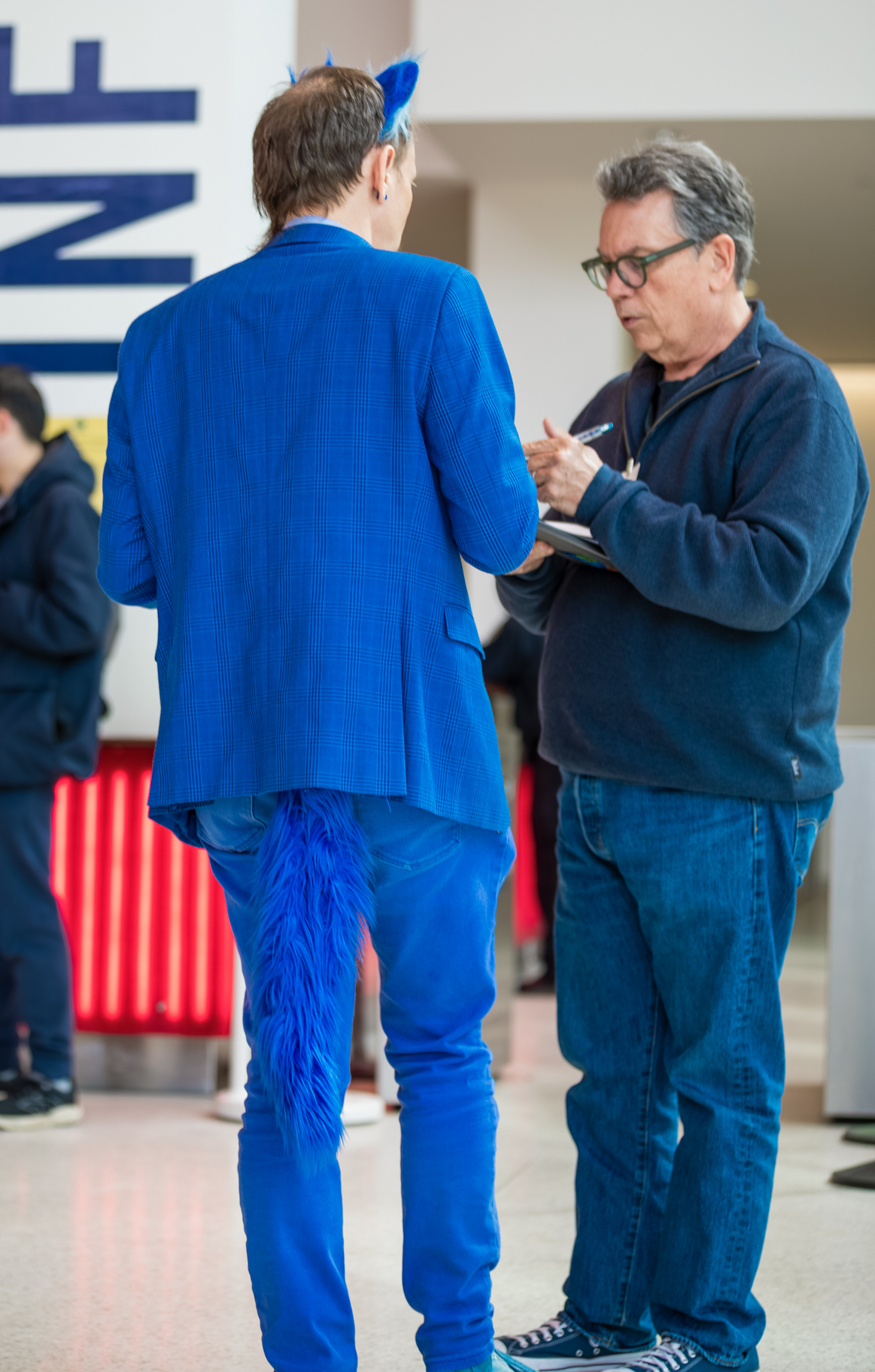
Adair interviews a Wikimedian at Wikipedia Day NYC 2026

== Academic career ==
Adair is a former adjunct faculty member at the Poynter Institute. In 2013, he was appointed Knight Professor of the Practice of Journalism and Public Policy at Duke University, one of 25 Knight Chairs at universities around the country.

Adair has conducted research on fact checking as a professor. In 2013 Adair replaced Sarah Cohen, a Pulitzer Prize-winning Washington Post reporter, as the director of the Duke Reporters' Lab, described by Duke as “an online forum for journalism innovation.” Under Adair's leadership, The Duke Reporters' Lab has shifted its focus to structured journalism and fact-checking. Adair has said he would "like to continue experimenting with things that really take the power of the web and mobile devices in presenting information in new ways."

In October 2024, when he published Beyond the Big Lie, a book examining lying in politics, Adair said that Republicans lied far more than Democrats, by a margin of 55% to 31%, for fact checks conducted between 2016 and 2021. He added that the disparity was not caused by Republicans being checked more often or more critically. Adair said: "Republicans see their work as part of this epic battle and in that, it is such an important cause to them that they really believe that lying is justified in that epic battle." As of 2025, he is working on a book about Wikipedia.

== Personal life ==
Adair has been married to Katherine Swoboda Adair, since at least 1989.

== Awards ==
- Pulitzer Prize for National Reporting (shared)
- Manship Prize for New Media in Democratic Discourse
- Everett Dirksen Award for Distinguished Coverage of Congress
