= East Valley Tribune =

Newspaper in metropolitan Phoenix, Arizona

- Type: Weekly newspaper
- Format: Tabloid
- Owner: Times Media Group
- Founder: W.D. Morton
- Publisher: Steve Strickbine
- Editor: Paul Maryniak
- Founded: 1892
- Headquarters: 1620 W. Fountainhead Parkway, Ste. 219; Tempe, AZ 85282; US
- Circulation: 170,000
- OCLC number: 43033537
- Website: eastvalleytribune.com

The East Valley Tribune is a newspaper concentrated on cities within the East Valley region of metropolitan Phoenix, including Mesa, Tempe, Chandler, Gilbert, and Queen Creek.

Formerly a daily newspaper, the Tribune resulted from the combination of local newspapers acquired by Cox Enterprises: The Tempe Daily News, the Mesa Tribune, the Gilbert Tribune, the Scottsdale Progress, and the Chandler Arizonan.

== History ==
In September 1892, Judge W.D. Morton founded the Mesa Free Press. The Arizona Sentinel, which Morton edited at one time, called the Free Press "a racy, spicy, ably edited journal." In 1894, attorney Alfred P. Shewman became co-editor. In 1899, Morton sold out to Shewman. In 1901, Shewman died of Pneumonia, and a week later the paper was leased the paper to Frank T. Pomeroy and Harry D. Haines. In 1909, a new Cranston printing press was installed.

In 1911, A.F. Morris bought the paper. In 1913, editor Joseph L. Dunn renamed the Mesa Free Press to the Mesa Daily Tribune. In 1915, Judge George S. Irwin and George L. Allison bought the paper. In 1919, Henry D. Ross Jr. acquired the interests of Irwin, and then Allison two days later. In 1925, Ross Jr. sold the Tribune to C.D. Rose, former owner of the Salisbury Post. The two renamed the paper to the Mesa Journal-Tribune.

In 1932, corporation made up of Mesa and Chandler businessmen acquired the Mesa Journal-Tribune. The ownership group included P.R. Mitten and his son Charles A. Mitten. The two owned the Chandler Arizonian, but sold it in 1933 to fully focus on the Journal-Tribune. In 1947, co-publisher P.R. Mitten died. In January 1949, the Journal-Tribune expanded into a daily and was renamed to The Daily Tribune. In 1950, C.A. Mitten sold the paper to David W. Calvert and Tilford W. Summers. In 1956, a fire destroyed the paper's office, causing an estimated $150,000 worth of damage. The printing plant relocated to a new property five months later. In 1962, Calvert died. R.W. Calvert succeeded him as publisher and in 1965 purchased the Palo Verde Valley Times of Blythe, California.

In 1977, Cox Newspapers acquired the Mesa Tribune and Palo Verde Valley Times. Cox acquired the Tempe Daily News in 1979, the Chandler Arizonan in 1983, and the Yuma Sun in 1984. The company started the Gilbert Tribune in 1990, and purchased the Scottsdale Progress in 1993. Cox sold its six newspapers in Arizona to Thomson Newspapers in 1996. Thomson acquired the Daily News-Sun of Sun City in 1997, and the Ahwatukee Foothills News in 1998. A year later, the Mesa Tribune was renamed to the East Valley Tribune.

In 2000, Freedom purchased all the newspapers in Arizona owned by Thomson Newspapers. The sale included three dailies: Mesa Tribune, Daily News-Sun, and Yuma Sun, and several weeklies including the Ahwatukee Foothills News. In 2008, Freedom discontinued the Tribune's Scottsdale and Tempe editions, although it would publish four distinct editions serving Mesa, Chandler, Gilbert and Queen Creek. At that time the combined Tribune circulation across all editions was 100,000. Print was reduced to four days a week, and 142 jobs were cut, amounting to 40% of Tribune staff. In 2009, the Tribune was awarded the Pulitzer Prize for Local Reporting for its five-part series on Maricopa County Sheriff Joe Arpaio.

Later that year, Freedom Communications filed for Chapter 11 Bankruptcy. As a result, the Tribune announced that it would cease operations on December 31, 2009. However, Freedom kept publishing the Tribune past the deadlines after 10/13 Communications LLC, an affiliate of Thirteenth Street Media of Boulder, Colorado, agreed to buy the paper. The transaction was approved by the bankruptcy judge in March 2010, as part of Freedom's reorganization process. The sale included the Tribune, the Daily News-Sun, the Ahwatukee Foothills News, Glendale/Peoria Today and Surprise Today. 10/13 Communications already owned a free-distribution weekly in the state called The Northwest Explorer.

As a result of the sale, the Tribune relocated to staff to three smaller offices in Mesa, Tempe and Chandler. In March 2011, its main office was then relocated to Tempe. The paper's archive was donated to the Chandler Museum. In early 2012, the former Tribune complex was acquired by a private developer, extensively renovated and leased to the State of Arizona as the Mesa neighborhood offices for the Department of Economic Security. In 2016, Times Media Group, acquired the East Valley Tribune and Ahwatukee Foothills News from 10/13 Communications. The Daily News-Sun, Glendale/Peoria Today and Surprise Today were later sold to Independent Newspapers Inc.

== See also ==
- Phoenix Tribune
