= Ahwatukee Foothills News =

Weekly newspaper in Phoenix, Arizona, US

- Type: Weekly newspaper
- Format: Broadsheet
- Owner: Times Media Group
- Publisher: Steve Strickbine
- Editor: Paul Maryniak
- Founded: 1976
- Language: English
- Headquarters: 1620 W. Fountainhead Parkway, Ste. 219; Tempe, AZ 85282; US
- Circulation: 27,684 (as of 2022)
- Website: ahwatukee.com

The Ahwatukee Foothills News is a weekly newspaper that serves the Ahwatukee district of the city of Phoenix. Its education and sports coverage mainly revolves around the two high schools serving the district: Mountain Pointe High School and Desert Vista High School (both part of the Tempe Union High School District).

The paper is delivered every Wednesday and boasts a circulation of 28,000.

== History ==
In 1976, Bruce Gillam, president of Presley Development Company, hired the Leslie Riell Publishing Company to create a monthly newsletter to promote Ahwatukee, Phoenix. where Presley was constructing homes. In 1978, the paper was renamed to the Ahwatukee News. A few years later editor Clay Schad bought the paper from Riell.

In 1988, the paper once again changed its name, this time to the Ahwatukee Weekly News. The current incarnation is the Ahwatukee Foothills News. In November 1998, Thompson Newspaper bought the News for $3.5 million. At that time the paper had a circulation of 28,000.

In 2000, Freedom Communications purchased all the newspapers in Arizona owned by Thomson. The sale included the Ahwatukee Foothills News, East Valley Tribune, and Yuma Sun. In 2009, Freedom Communications filed for Chapter 11 Bankruptcy. In 2010, the company sold the East Valley Tribune, the Daily News-Sun, the Ahwatukee Foothills News, Glendale/Peoria Today and Surprise Today to 10/13 Communications. In 2016, Times Media Group acquired the East Valley Tribune and Ahwatukee Foothills News from 10/13 Communications.
