= New Tempe Arena =

Proposed arena in Tempe, Arizona

- Rendering of the proposed arena
- Interactive map of New Tempe Arena
- Location: Tempe, Arizona
- Coordinates: 33°25′58″N 111°57′27″W
- Owner: Arizona Coyotes
- Operator: Arizona Coyotes
- Capacity: 16,000

The New Tempe Arena was a proposed sports facility to be constructed in Tempe, Arizona, that would have served as a permanent new home arena for the Arizona Coyotes of the National Hockey League (NHL). This was part of a conceptual $1.7 billion Tempe Entertainment District at hand. The proposal would have also included hotels, retail, apartments, and a theater. It was ultimately rejected by City of Tempe voters on May 16, 2023.

== Design and construction ==
After years of informal negotiations between the City of Tempe Economic Development Development Office and Arizona Coyotes management, the Coyotes proposed a 16,000-seat arena that would have been located on a parcel of city owned land adjacent to the Salt River. The project would have been built on an old city dump site, requiring remediation and reloating the city's municipal maintenance and storage facility on the site.

== History ==
After a failed attempt to facilitate a new arena on the Arizona State University campus at the former Karsten Golf Course in 2017, the Coyotes organization started talking with the City of Tempe regarding alternate locations. On June 2, 2022, the Tempe City Council voted 5 to 2 to begin formal negotiations with the Coyotes, with a final agreement made at least several months later. The City of Phoenix implied that litigation over development around the arena would be likely if Tempe approves the development the Coyotes proposed. The FAA would have had to approve of all the building heights and locations, as the proposed arena in question was directly under the centerline of runway 7L/25R. The Coyotes were also seeking city sales tax revenues and a 30-year waiver of property taxes to help pay for $200 million in additional costs, including infrastructure work.

On May 16, 2023, Tempe voters rejected the new arena and entertainment district, with all three propositions relating to the new arena and entertainment district being given the no vote. Less than a year after the rejected votes happened, Coyotes owner Alex Meruelo and the NHL agreed to a planned waiving of the Arizona Coyotes franchise and the creation of the Utah Hockey Club (now Utah Mammoth) starting in the 2024-25 NHL season, with an initial hope to revive the Coyotes by as late as 2029.

After the proposal in Tempe failed to go through, the Coyotes proposed new arena renderings in northeast Phoenix in early 2024. The new location would have been off of Arizona Loop 101 and Scottsdale Road. However, the Arizona State Land Department would cancel a land auction for a 110-acre parcel of land in north Phoenix that Meruelo planned to buy for a site for a new arena for the Coyotes on June 21, 2024. Days after that, Meruelo would announce that he would no longer pursue further options to find new land or arena options for the team, later relinquishing his rights on the Coyotes franchise entirely on July 10. Despite that notion, however, there are no confirmed plans on what's going on with the Coyotes franchise as of September 2024, though it is reported that a new leader in the Phoenix region, Maricopa County Board of Supervisors Chair Tom Galvin, expressed to NHL commissioner Gary Bettman genuine interest in bringing about a committee of political and business leaders to help bring back the Coyotes franchise within the state of Arizona as of late 2024 and early 2025.

== Concerns ==
Due to the site location, Phoenix Sky Harbor International Airport officials had expressed concerns that the Tempe Entertainment District would cause a risk for inbound and outbound aircraft. The City of Phoenix was also concerned that residential uses would occur within the 65 dB contour, violating a 1994 intergovernmental agreement between Tempe and Phoenix. In 2001, a similar roadblock prevented the Arizona Cardinals from building a stadium near Rio Salado Parkway, which resulted in them moving to Glendale in 2006 to play at the State Farm Stadium to this very day. Local residents have also raised concerns about the community's cost-benefit based on traffic congestion, quality of employment opportunities, and impact on adjacent neighborhoods. Months after the failed vote happened, the Arizona Attorney General's Office launched an investigation into the City of Tempe taxpayer funds being used to gather information on members of the public who opposed the arena effort. On October 15, 2024, the attorney general of Tempe discovered that city mayor Corey Woods and several council members held three closed-door meetings during the months of November and December 2022 with consulting group Strategy Forty-Eight, a consulting group the council of Tempe had hired to monitor social media opposition to the arena plan. Information revealed from an audio recording of the closed-doors meeting on December 15, 2022, had showcased Tempe officials like Woods had criticized opponents of the new arena plan by comparing the no-voters for the arena plan as an equivalent to "cave people" and equating the ringleader of the no-voters, Ron Tapscott, to a "crazy uncle".
