= Tempe Daily News =

Former newspaper in Arizona

- Format: Broadsheet
- Publisher: Curt W. Miller (1887–1943); Curt W. Miller (1943–1944); Francis Connolly (1944–1978); Mrs. Connolly (1978–1980)
- Founded: 1887
- City: Tempe, Arizona
- Country: United States
- Circulation: 15,000 (as of 1958)
- OCLC number: 12255412
- Website: thetempe.com

The Tempe Daily News was an afternoon newspaper published in Tempe, Arizona, a suburb of Phoenix. It was created in 1887 when Curt W. Miller (1864–1943) purchased the 20-month-old Salt River Valley News from publishers John Byron Fitch and T.B. Martin, renamed it Tempe Daily News, and published its first edition in August 1887.

The News became the town's official newspaper in 1895 and Miller continued publishing until his death in 1943.

Miller's grandson, Curt W. Miller, published the newspaper until September 1944, at which time he sold it to Francis Connolly. At the time, the paper had one carrier, one linotype machine, and a circulation of 110. Connolly published the News until his death in July 1978, by which time he had built its circulation to 15,000 and employed 80 carriers in addition to 50 other employees. His widow, Irma Connolly, published the paper until 1980, at which time she sold it to Cox Enterprises.

Cox renamed the paper Tempe Daily News Tribune in 1986 in order to make it consistent with the other newspapers it had acquired in the region. Cox sold its holdings to Canadian-based Thomson Newspapers in 1996 and the paper's new owners combined the Tempe Daily News Tribune with four other newspapers to form The Tribune in 1997. This publication became the East Valley Tribune in December 1999.

Thompson sold its holdings to California's Freedom Publications, Inc. in 2000. The East Valley Tribune ceased publication in 2009, ending 122 years of continuous local news coverage in Tempe.
