= San Pablo, Arizona =

Unincorporated community in the state of Arizona, United States

- Unincorporated community
- Location in Maricopa County and the state of Arizona San Pablo, Arizona (the United States)
- Coordinates: 33°25′35″N 111°55′57″W
- Country: United States
- State: Arizona
- County: Maricopa County
- Time zone: UTC-7 (MST)
  - Summer (DST): UTC-6 (MDT)
- ZIP code: 85287
- Area code: (480)

San Pablo was an unincorporated community located in Maricopa County, Arizona, United States. The San Pablo neighborhood was one of several Mexican colonias in the Salt River Valley around Phoenix, Arizona. In the 1950s, Arizona State University used its power of eminent domain to redevelop San Pablo into dormitories, sports facilities and commercial infrastructure.

== Geography ==
San Pablo was adjacent to Tempe, Arizona. The more eastern section was sometimes called the "Mickey Mouse Barrio."

== Historic buildings and areas ==
- Mount Carmel Catholic Church

== See also ==
- List of cities and towns in Arizona
