= List of mayors of Tempe =

There have been 32 mayors of the U.S. city of Tempe, Arizona since its incorporation in 1894. Mayors serve four-year terms and are elected directly by the voters of Tempe.

No.	Image	Name	Term	Source
1		Dr. Fenn J. Hart	1894–1896	
2		E.A. Murphy	1896–1897	
3		John Knight	1897–1902	
4		Samuel Brown	1902–1903	
5		J.A. Dines	1903–1912	
6		Joseph T. Birchett	1912–1914	
7		George M. Frizzell	1914–1916	
8		J.A. Dines	1916–1920	
9		C.M. Woodward	1920–1922	
10		Curt W. Miller	1922–1924	
11		Garfield A. Goodwin	1924–1926	
12		J.L. Felton	1926–1928	
13		Hugh E. Laird	1928–1930	
14		Thanks Anderson	1930–1932	
15		F. E. Ostrander	1932–1934	
16		Thanks Anderson	1934–1937	
17		W. W. Cole	1937–1948	
18		Hugh E. Laird	1948–1960	
19		Clyde Gililland	1960–1961	
20		Ross R. Rice	1961–1962	
21		Bernard R. Caine	1962–1963	
22		Harold Andrews	1963–1964	
23		John C. Moeur	1964–1966	
24		Rudy E. Campbell	1966–1968	
25		Elmer Bradley	1968–1970	
26		Dale R. Shumway	1970–1974	
27		William J. LoPiano	1974–1978	
28		Harry E. Mitchell	1978–1994	
29		Neil Giuliano	1994–2004	
30		Hugh Hallman	2004–2012	
31		Mark Mitchell	2012–2020	
32		Corey Woods	2020–present	
