= Corey Woods (mayor) =

American politician (born 1978)

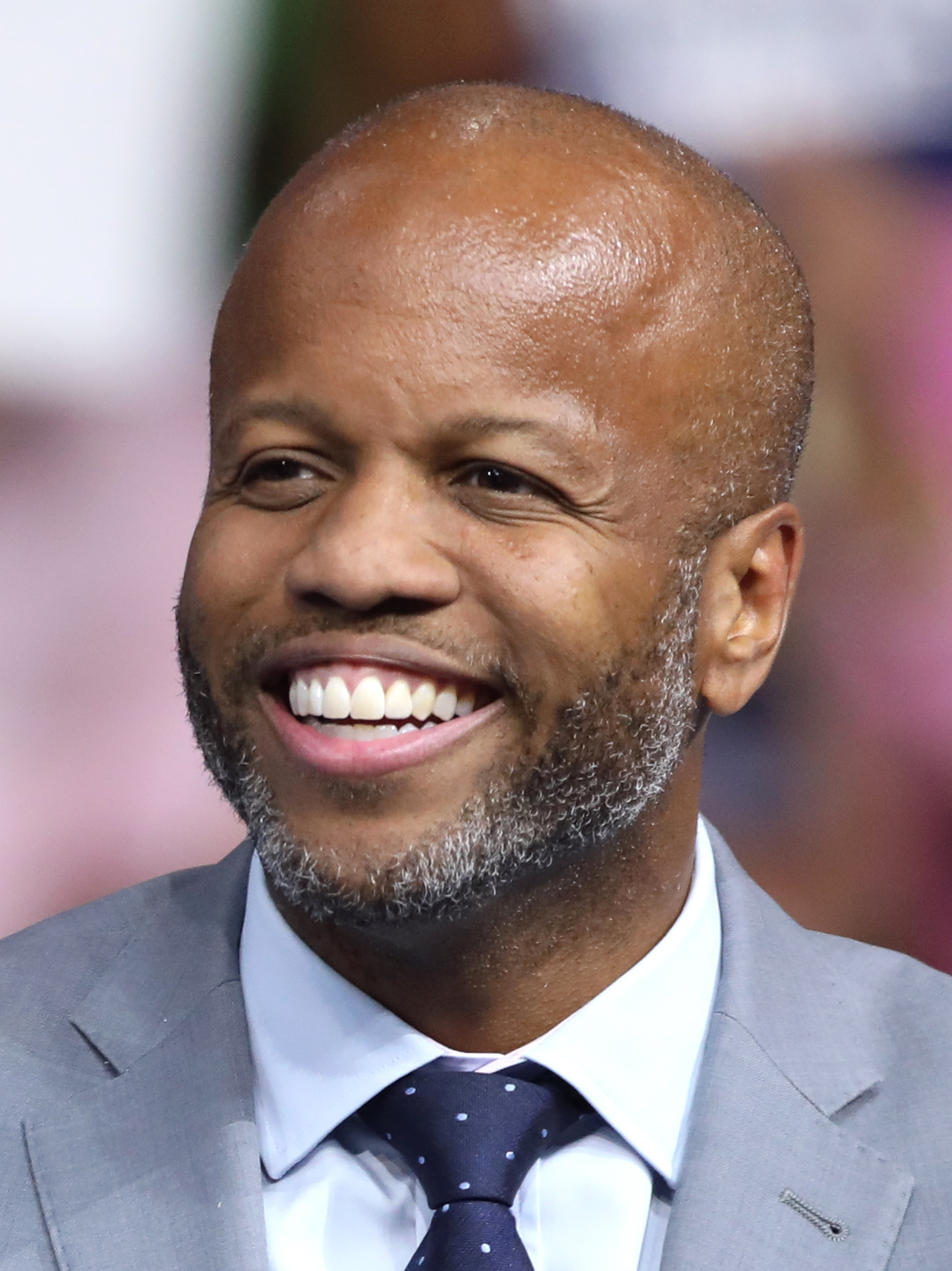
- Woods in 2024

Mayor of Tempe
- Incumbent
- Assumed office July 2, 2020
- Preceded by: Mark Mitchell

Member of Tempe City Council
- In office July 17, 2008 – July 7, 2016

Personal details
- Born: December 7, 1978 (age 47)
- Party: Democratic
- Education: B.A. University of Michigan; M.A. Arizona State University

Corey Donald Woods (born December 7, 1978) is an American politician serving as the mayor of Tempe, Arizona since 2020. Woods is a member of the Democratic Party.

== Biography ==
In 2000, he graduated with a B.A. in political science from the University of Michigan. In 2018, he graduated with a M.A. in educational policy from Arizona State University. He began his career in politics as a member of the Tempe City Council from 2008 to 2016. During this time he served as Tempe's Vice Mayor. He defeated incumbent mayor Mark Mitchell in 2020, becoming the city's first African-American mayor and Arizona's second.

While mayor, he focused on the creation of affordable housing. He founded "Hometown for All" which created an investment fund that would purchase properties and convert them into permanent affordable housing units.

During his tenure, Tempe partnered with Arizona State University and developed a wastewater surveillance process where wastewater was monitored to inform COVID-19 case rates, the first city in the country to do so. Tempe received a grant from the Centers for Disease Control and Prevention expand the program. The Tempe Streetcar transit line was completed during his term in 2022.

In 2022, the Arizona State Legislature named him to the bipartisan Housing Supply Study Committee tasked with developing solutions to the state's housing shortage.

In July 2022, Woods was appointed by the United States Conference of Mayors as Vice Chair of the Community Development and Housing Standing Committee tasked "to influence national policies that will increase affordable and workforce housing opportunities."

In July 2022, Tempe initiated a new program where 911 dispatchers would be paired with counselors who have experience in psychology, social work, and counseling to better respond to non-violent emergency calls where dispatching the police might not be the best response.

Woods had previously supported the development of the $2.1 billion Arizona Coyotes Entertainment District (including a New Tempe Arena) that would have hosted the NHL team permanently. On November 10, 2022, the Tempe city council voted 7-0 to allow residents to vote on the project in a special election on May 16, 2023. However, the new arena in Tempe was ultimately rejected by the city's voters. In October 2024, it was discovered that Woods and several councilmembers illegally held three secret meetings during November and December 2022 with Strategy Forty-Eight, a consulting group the council had hired to monitor social media opposition to the new arena plan. He also secured a city council vote for South Pier at Tempe Town Lake, a $1.8 billion 2,500 unit luxury apartment development. The project is currently on hold due to litigation over the granting of an 8-year tax abatement to the developer and its lack of affordable housing.

== See also ==
- List of first African-American mayors
