= Tempe, Arizona =

City in the United States

Tempe O'odham: Oidbaḍ
- City
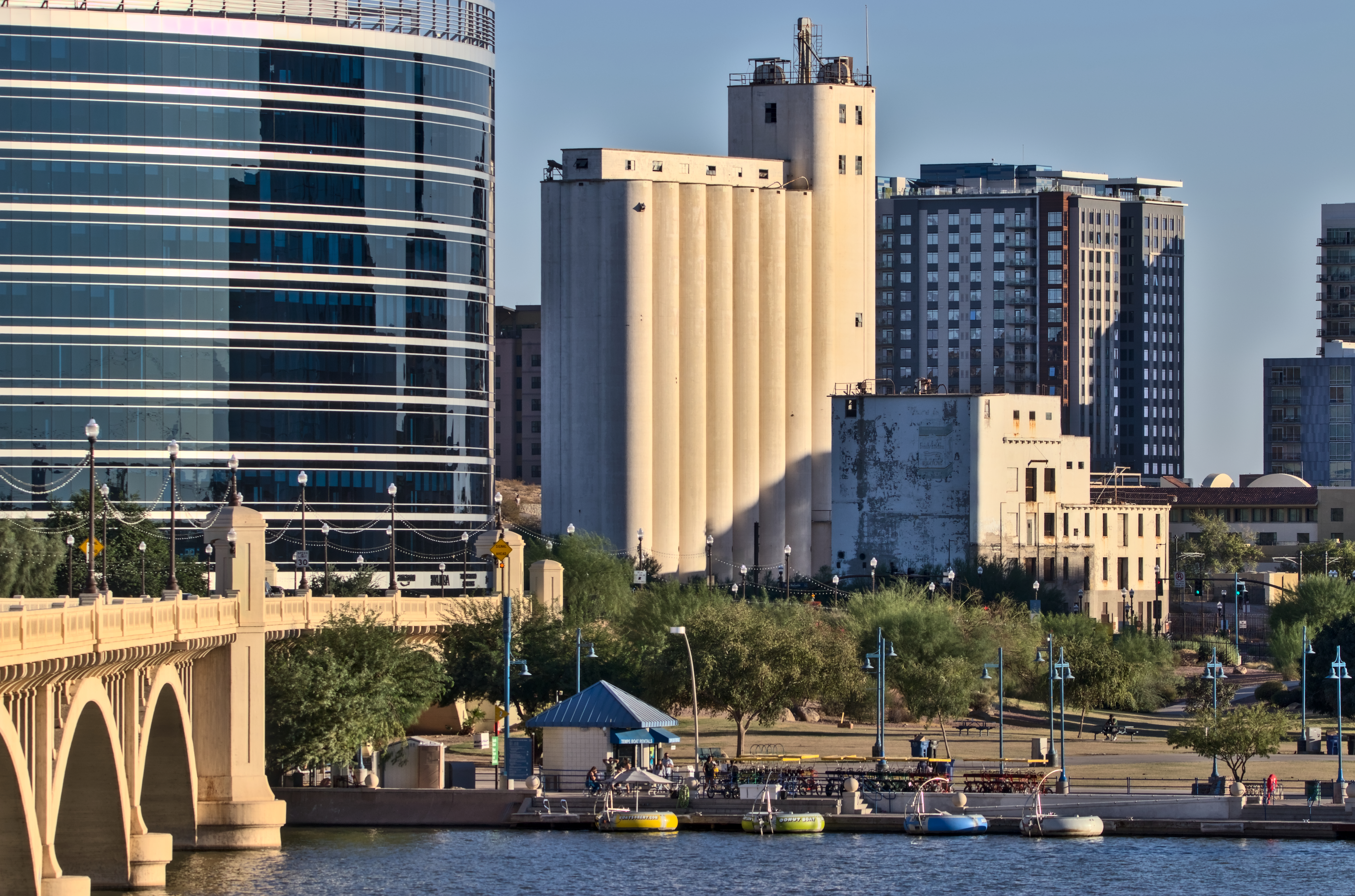
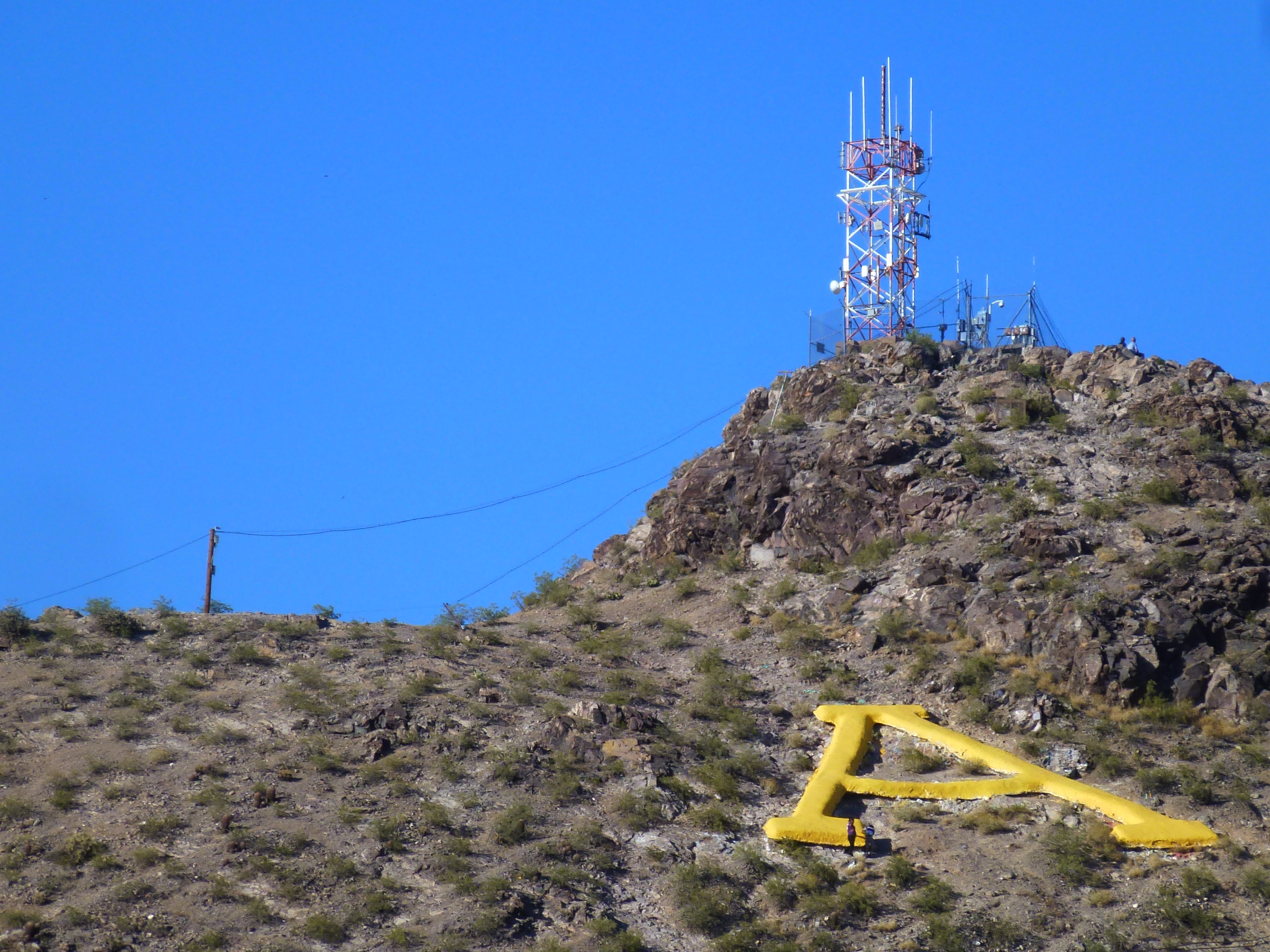
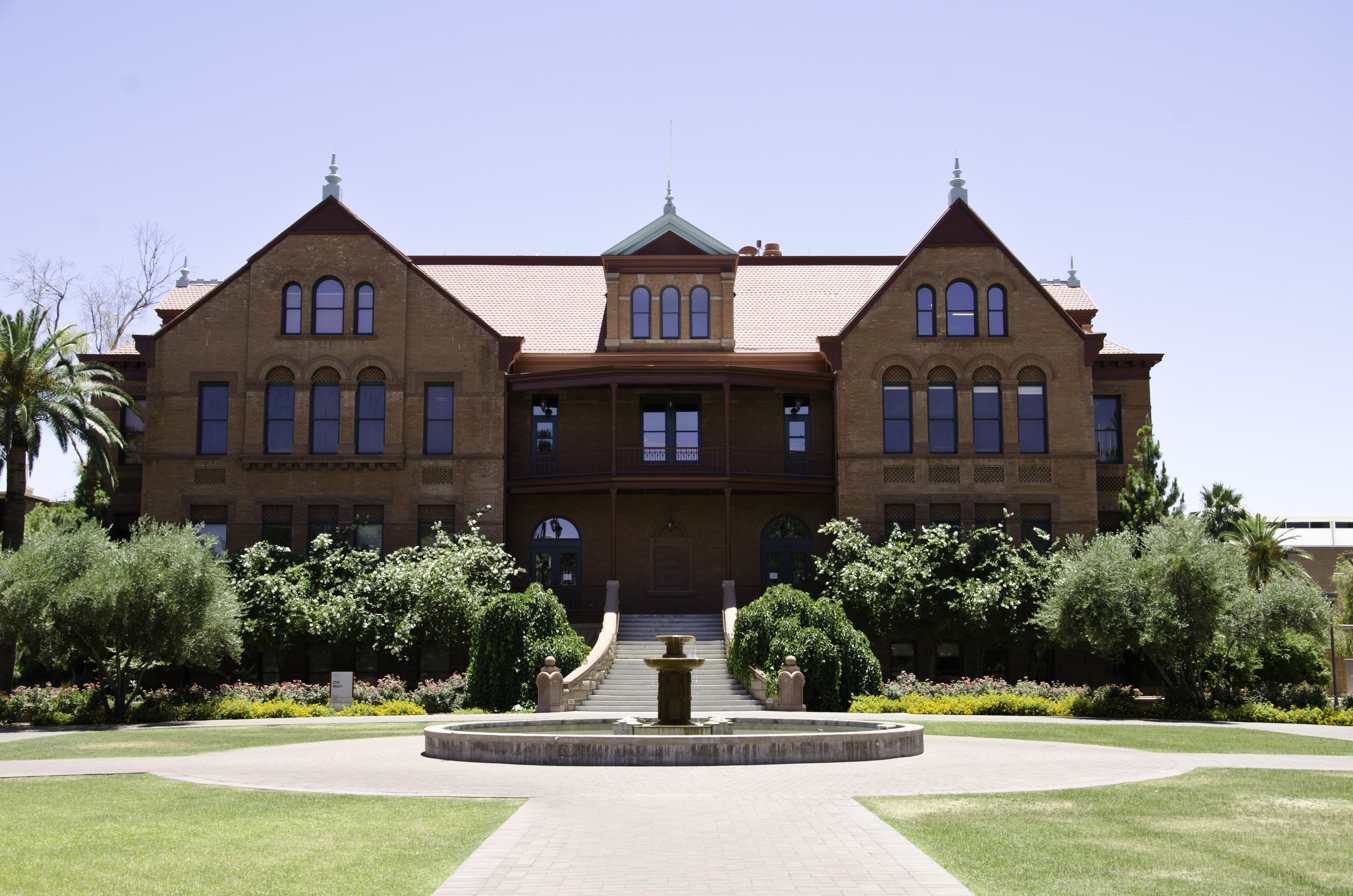
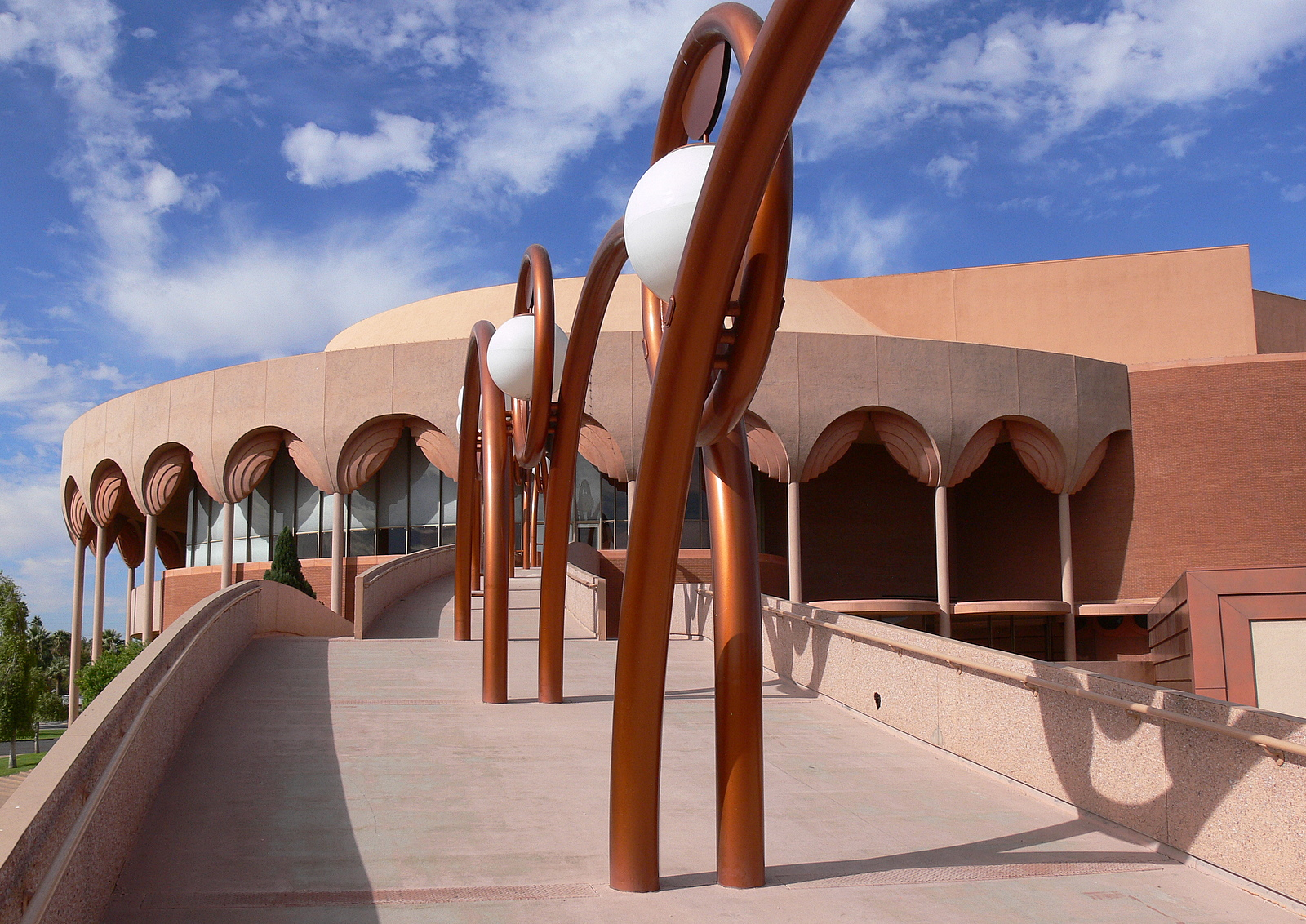
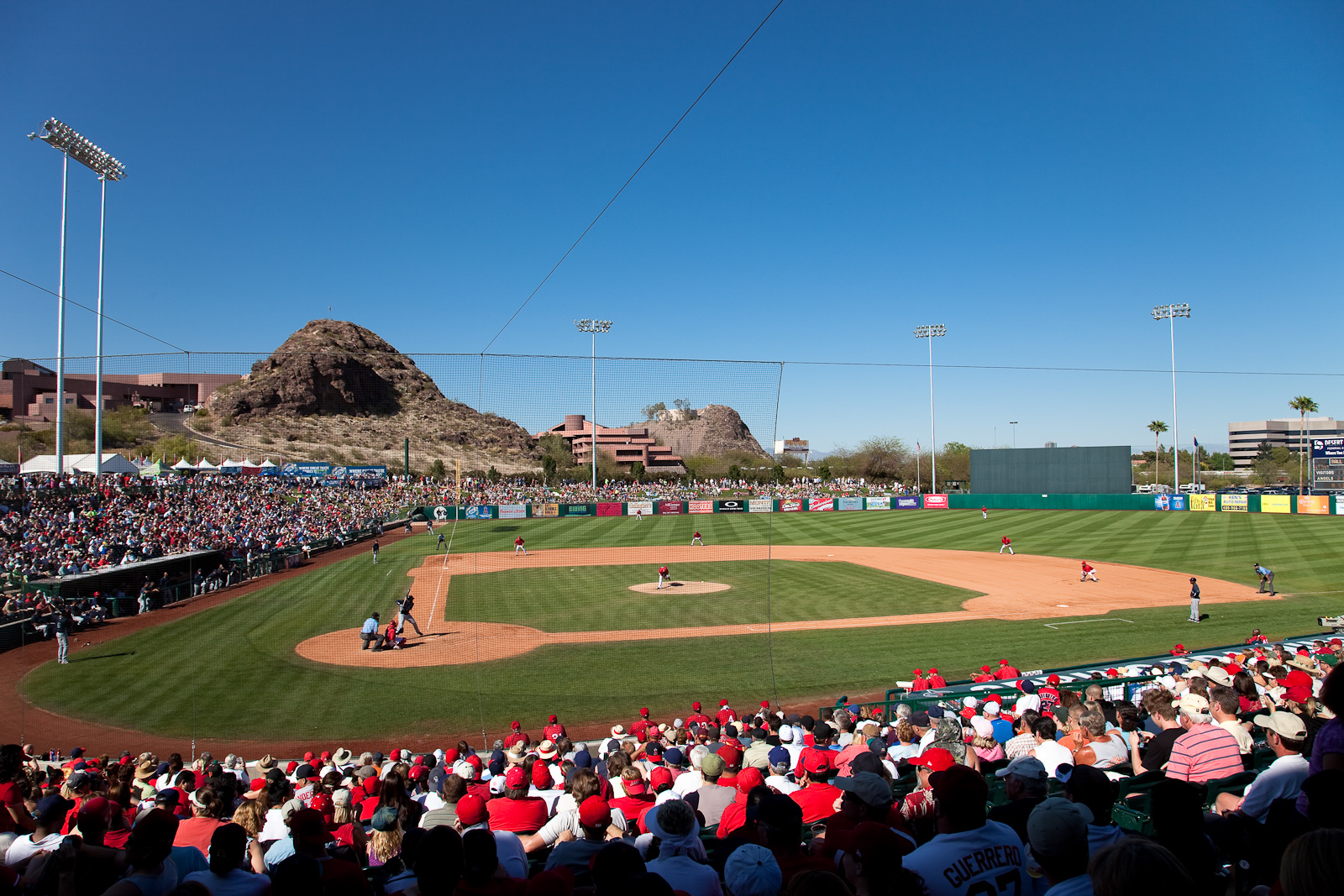
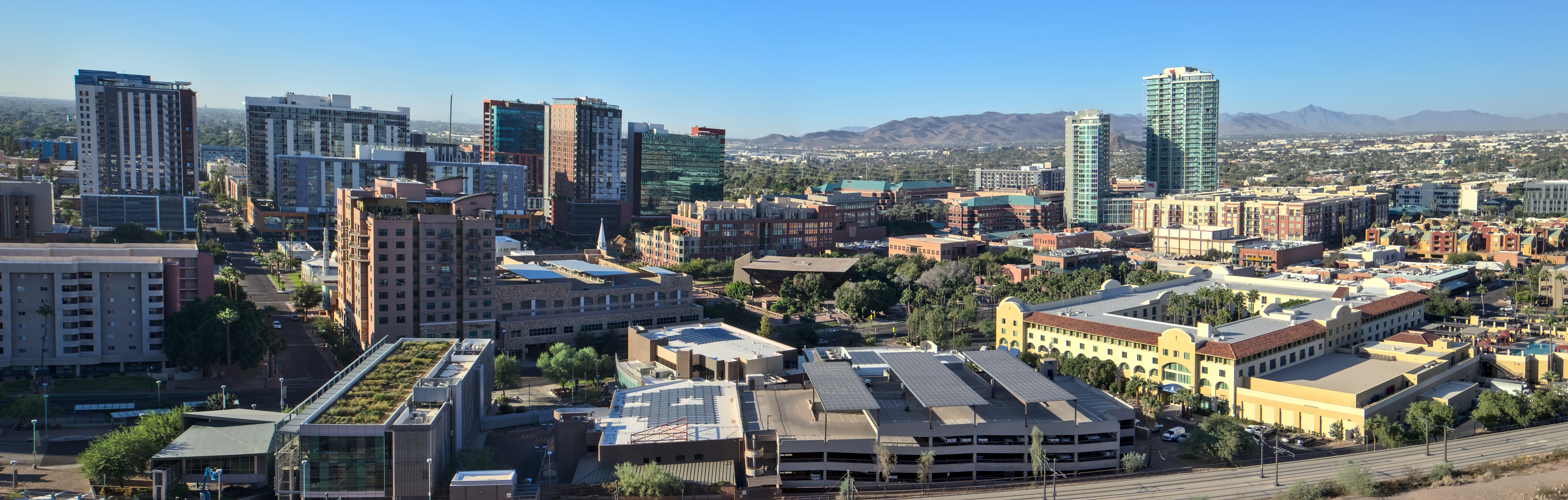
- Images from top to bottom, left to right: Mill Avenue Bridges and Tempe Town Lake, Tempe Butte, Arizona State University, Gammage Memorial Auditorium, Tempe Diablo Stadium, and Downtown Tempe

- Flag Logo

- Location of Tempe in Maricopa County, Arizona

- Location in Arizona Location in the United States
- Coordinates: 33°24′46″N 111°56′35″W
- Country: United States
- State: Arizona
- County: Maricopa
- Incorporated: October 15, 1892
- Named for: Vale of Tempe

Government
  - Body: Tempe City Council
  - Mayor: Corey Woods (D)

Area
  - City: 40.15 sq mi (103.99 km^{2})
  - Land: 39.94 sq mi (103.45 km^{2})
  - Water: 0.21 sq mi (0.54 km^{2})
- Elevation: 1,181 ft (360 m)

Population (2020)
  - City: 180,587
  - Rank: US: 140th
  - Density: 4,521.4/sq mi (1,745.72/km^{2})
  - Metro: 4,574,531 (US: 12th)
  - Demonym: Tempean
- Time zone: UTC−07:00 (MST)
- ZIP code: 85281–85285, 85287-85288
- Area codes: 480 and 602
- FIPS code: 04-73000
- GNIS feature ID: 2412045
- Website: tempe.gov

Tempe (/tɛmˈpiː/ tem-PEE; O'odham: Oidbaḍ) is a city in Maricopa County, Arizona, United States, with the Census Bureau reporting a 2020 population of 180,587. The city is home to the main campus of Arizona State University, one of the largest public universities by enrollment in the United States.

== History ==
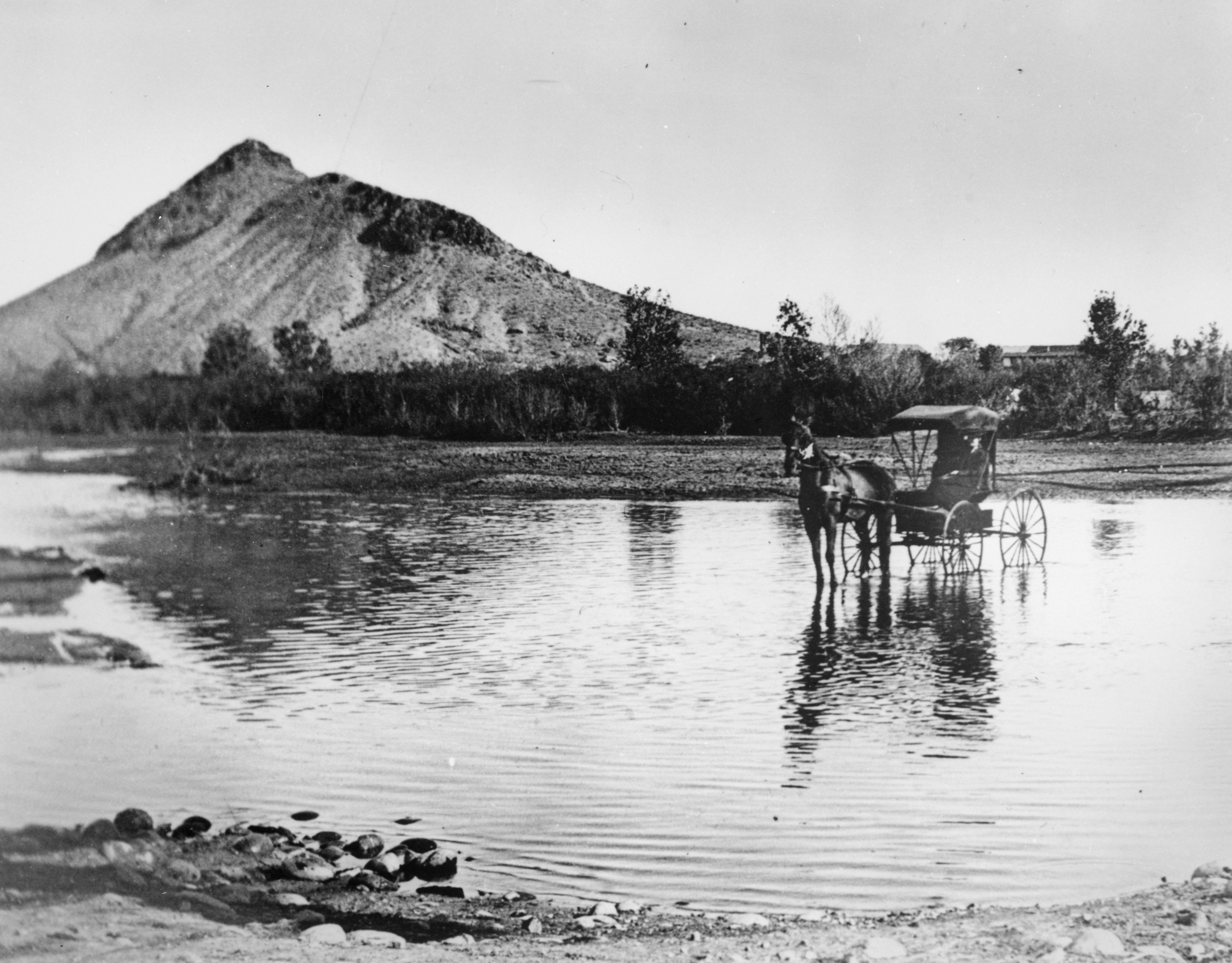
Tempe c. 1870–1880

The Hohokam lived in this area and built canals to support their agriculture. They abandoned their settlements during the 15th century, with a few individuals and families remaining nearby.

Fort McDowell was established approximately 25 mi (40 km) northeast of present downtown Tempe on the upper Salt River in 1865 allowing for new towns to be built farther down the Salt River. US military service members and Hispanic workers were hired to grow food and animal feed to supply the fort, and less than a year later, had set up small camps near the river that were the first permanent communities in the Valley after the fall of the Hohokam. (Phoenix was settled shortly afterward, by 1867–68.) The two settlements were 'Hayden's Ferry', named after a ferry service operated by Charles T. Hayden, and 'San Pablo', and were located west and east of Hayden Butte respectively. The ferry became the key river crossing in the area. The Tempe Irrigating Canal Company was soon established by William Kirkland and James McKinney to provide water for alfalfa, wheat, barley, oats, and cotton.

Pioneer Darrell Duppa is credited with suggesting Tempe's name, adopted in 1879, after comparing the Salt River valley near a 300-foot (91 m)-tall butte, to the Vale of Tempe near Mount Olympus in Greece.

From its founding in 1871 until 90 years later, Tempe was a sundown town where African Americans were permitted to work but forced to live elsewhere. In 1965, Warren and Carol Livingston were the first African Americans to buy property in Tempe.

In 1885, the 13th Arizona Territorial Legislature chose Tempe for the site of the Territorial Normal School, which became Arizona Normal School, Arizona State Teachers College, Arizona State College and finally Arizona State University.

The Maricopa and Phoenix Railroad, built in 1887, crossed the Salt River at Tempe, linking the town to the nation's growing transportation system. The Tempe Land and Improvement Company was formed to sell lots in the booming town. Tempe became an economic hub for the surrounding agricultural area. The Maricopa County Board of Supervisors incorporated the town of Tempe in 1894.

The completion of Roosevelt Dam in 1911 guaranteed enough water to meet the growing needs of Valley farmers. On his way to dedicate the dam, former President Theodore Roosevelt applauded the accomplishments of the people of central Arizona and predicted that their towns would be prosperous cities in the future. Less than a year later, Arizona was admitted as the 48th state, and the Salt River Valley continued to develop.

On August 30, 1971, Tempe was hit by a rare F2 tornado that injured 41 people, the most injuries recorded from a tornado in Arizona, and caused damage in upwards of $3 million. One indirect fatality occurred when a man died from a heart attack during the storm.

In the 20th and 21st centuries, Tempe has expanded as a suburb of Phoenix, and as a center of education and commerce.

== Geography ==
Tempe is an inner suburb, located between the core city of Phoenix and the rest of the East Valley. Due to this, as well as being the home of the main campus of Arizona State University, Tempe has a fairly dense, urbanized development pattern in the northern part of the city especially in relation to the Valley Metro Line. Going south, development becomes less dense, consisting of single-family homes, strip malls and lower-density office parks.

The Salt River runs west through the northern part of Tempe; part of the river is dammed in two places to create Tempe Town Lake.

According to the United States Census Bureau, the landlocked city has a total area of 40.2 square miles (104 km^{2}), of which 40.1 square miles (104 km^{2}) is land and 0.1 square miles (0.26 km^{2}) is water. The total area is 0.32% water, including Tempe Town Lake. The city of Tempe is bordered by Mesa to the east, Scottsdale and the Salt River Pima–Maricopa Indian Community to the north, Phoenix and Guadalupe to the west, and Chandler to the south.

Tempe is generally flat, except for Tempe Butte or Hayden Butte (generally known as A-Mountain for Arizona State University's "A" logo located on its south face), located next to Sun Devil Stadium, Twin Buttes and Bell Butte on the western edge of Tempe, and the buttes within Papago Park at northwest corner of Tempe. Elevation ranges from 1,140 feet (350 m) at Tempe Town Lake to 1,495 feet (456 m) atop Hayden Butte.

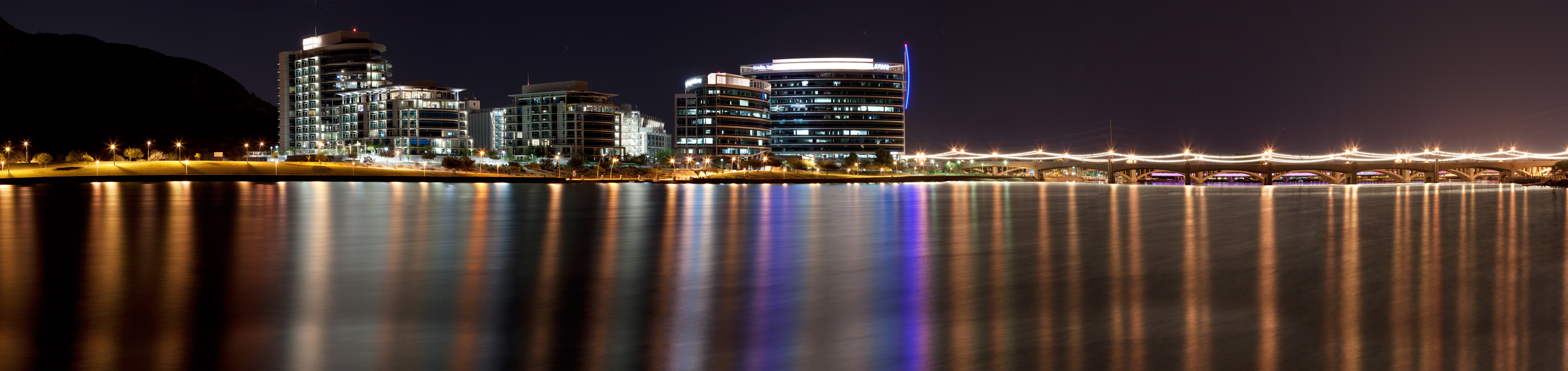
Tempe cityscape from Tempe Town Lake

=== Climate ===
Tempe experiences a hot-desert climate (Köppen: BWh) with a higher degree of diurnal temperature variation than neighboring Phoenix.

Climate data for Tempe, Arizona, 1991–2020 normals, extremes 1948–present
Month	Jan	Feb	Mar	Apr	May	Jun	Jul	Aug	Sep	Oct	Nov	Dec	Year
Record high °F (°C)	87 (31)	92 (33)	100 (38)	105 (41)	113 (45)	119 (48)	118 (48)	119 (48)	115 (46)	112 (44)	98 (37)	88 (31)	119 (48)
Mean maximum °F (°C)	80.2 (26.8)	83.2 (28.4)	90.6 (32.6)	98.0 (36.7)	104.1 (40.1)	110.5 (43.6)	112.2 (44.6)	110.8 (43.8)	107.5 (41.9)	100.7 (38.2)	89.9 (32.2)	79.9 (26.6)	113.1 (45.1)
Mean daily maximum °F (°C)	70.6 (21.4)	73.7 (23.2)	80.4 (26.9)	86.9 (30.5)	95.0 (35.0)	103.7 (39.8)	105.9 (41.1)	104.8 (40.4)	100.8 (38.2)	91.0 (32.8)	79.0 (26.1)	69.3 (20.7)	88.4 (31.3)
Daily mean °F (°C)	54.5 (12.5)	57.3 (14.1)	63.1 (17.3)	68.9 (20.5)	77.1 (25.1)	85.3 (29.6)	90.9 (32.7)	89.9 (32.2)	84.9 (29.4)	73.6 (23.1)	62.0 (16.7)	53.5 (11.9)	71.8 (22.1)
Mean daily minimum °F (°C)	38.5 (3.6)	40.9 (4.9)	45.9 (7.7)	50.9 (10.5)	59.1 (15.1)	67.0 (19.4)	75.8 (24.3)	75.1 (23.9)	68.9 (20.5)	56.3 (13.5)	45.1 (7.3)	37.7 (3.2)	55.1 (12.8)
Mean minimum °F (°C)	30.5 (−0.8)	33.8 (1.0)	37.8 (3.2)	42.5 (5.8)	51.4 (10.8)	60.3 (15.7)	68.7 (20.4)	68.6 (20.3)	60.3 (15.7)	46.7 (8.2)	36.0 (2.2)	29.5 (−1.4)	27.4 (−2.6)
Record low °F (°C)	16 (−9)	19 (−7)	24 (−4)	30 (−1)	35 (2)	45 (7)	53 (12)	52 (11)	45 (7)	26 (−3)	23 (−5)	20 (−7)	16 (−9)
Average precipitation inches (mm)	1.04 (26)	1.12 (28)	0.96 (24)	0.23 (5.8)	0.18 (4.6)	0.06 (1.5)	0.99 (25)	1.30 (33)	0.71 (18)	0.61 (15)	0.65 (17)	0.95 (24)	8.80 (224)
Average precipitation days (≥ 0.01 in)	4.4	4.5	3.3	1.3	1.2	0.6	3.7	4.5	2.9	2.3	2.0	3.6	34.3
Source 1: NOAA
Source 2: National Weather Service

== Demographics ==
Historical population
Census	Pop.	Note	%±
1880	135		—
1890	897		564.4%
1900	885		−1.3%
1910	1,473		66.4%
1920	1,963		33.3%
1930	2,495		27.1%
1940	2,906		16.5%
1950	7,684		164.4%
1960	24,897		224.0%
1970	63,550		155.3%
1980	106,919		68.2%
1990	141,865		32.7%
2000	158,945		12.0%
2010	161,719		1.7%
2020	180,587		11.7%
U.S. Decennial Census

Tempe, Arizona – Racial and ethnic composition Note: the US Census treats Hispanic/Latino as an ethnic category. This table excludes Latinos from the racial categories and assigns them to a separate category. Hispanics/Latinos may be of any race.
Race / Ethnicity (NH = Non-Hispanic)	Pop 2000	Pop 2010	Pop 2020	% 2000	% 2010	% 2020
White alone (NH)	110,517	100,711	97,651	69.67%	62.28%	54.07%
Black or African American alone (NH)	5,546	9,021	11,393	3.50%	5.58%	6.31%
Native American or Alaska Native alone (NH)	2,678	3,870	4,357	1.69%	2.39%	2.41%
Asian alone (NH)	7,405	9,035	17,169	4.67%	5.59%	9.51%
Pacific Islander alone (NH)	425	618	688	0.27%	0.38%	0.38%
Some Other Race alone (NH)	244	312	939	0.15%	0.19%	0.52%
Mixed Race or Multi-Racial (NH)	3,337	4,060	8,692	2.10%	2.51%	4.81%
Hispanic or Latino (any race)	28,473	34,092	39,698	17.95%	21.08%	21.98%
Total	158,625	161,719	180,587	100.00%	100.00%	100.00%

As of the 2010 census, there were 161,719 people, 63,602 households, and 33,645 families residing in the city. The population density was 3,959.4 inhabitants per square mile (1,528.7/km^{2}). There were 67,068 housing units at an average density of 1,674.1 per square mile (646.4/km^{2}). The racial makeup of the city was 77.5% White, 5.9% Black or African American, 2.9% Native American, 5.7% Asian, 0.4% Pacific Islander, 8.5% from other races, and 3.9% from two or more races. 21.2% of the population were Hispanic or Latino of any race.

There were 63,602 households, out of which 24.4% had children under the age of 18 living with them, 38.4% were married couples living together, 9.7% had a female householder with no husband present, and 47.1% were non-families. 28.5% of all households were made up of individuals, and 4.6% had someone living alone who was 65 years of age or older. The average household size was 2.41 and the average family size was 3.05.

In the city, 19.8% of the population was under the age of 18, 21.3% from 18 to 24, 33.2% from 25 to 44, 18.5% from 45 to 64, and 7.2% who were 65 years of age or older. The median age was 29 years. For every 100 females, there were 106.9 males. For every 100 females age 18 and over, there were 107.1 males.

The median income for a household in the city was $42,361, and the median income for a family was $55,237. Males had a median income of $36,406 versus $28,605 for females. The per capita income for the city was $22,406. About 7.5% of families and 14.3% of the population were below the poverty line, including 13.6% of those under age 18 and 5.1% of those age 65 or over.

There is a Mexican-American community in Tempe centered around the neighboring town of Guadalupe.

== Economy ==
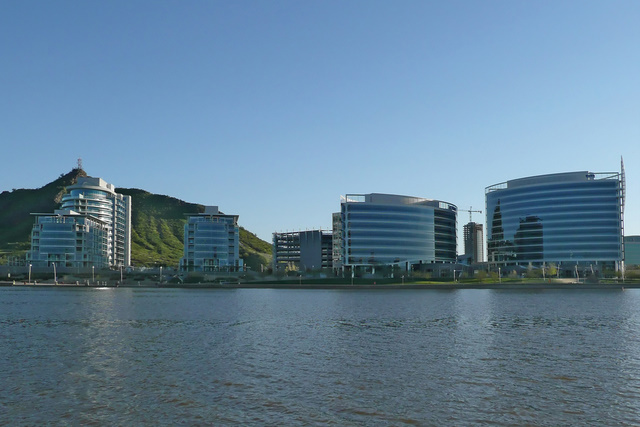
Hayden Ferry Lakeside development on the north end of Downtown Tempe

Tempe is the headquarters and executive office of one Fortune 500 company: DriveTime. Benchmark Electronics, Carvana, GoDaddy, NortonLifeLock, First Solar, the Salt River Project, Circle K, and Fulton Homes are also headquartered in Tempe. Cold Stone Creamery was originally headquartered in Tempe and location #0001 is still in operation today at 3330 S McClintock Drive in Tempe. Tempe prides itself in assisting burgeoning businesses and has a variety of resources and programs available, such as FABRiC (Fashion and Business Resource Innovation Center) and BRiC (Business Resource and Innovation Center).

Tempe is also home to the first and largest campus of Arizona State University. It was the longtime host of the Fiesta Bowl (1971–2006), where it hosted multiple national championship college football games. It then began hosting the Insight Bowl in December 2006, which remained through the January 2015 playing, when it was known as the Cactus Bowl.

Tempe houses several performance venues including Gammage Auditorium and the Tempe Center for the Arts.

Tempe Town Lake is home to many national and international events, such as Ironman Arizona and Rock n Roll Marathon. Gammage Auditorium was also the site of one of the three Presidential debates in 2004, and Super Bowl XXX was played at Sun Devil Stadium. Additionally, Tempe is the spring training host city of the Los Angeles Angels of Anaheim.

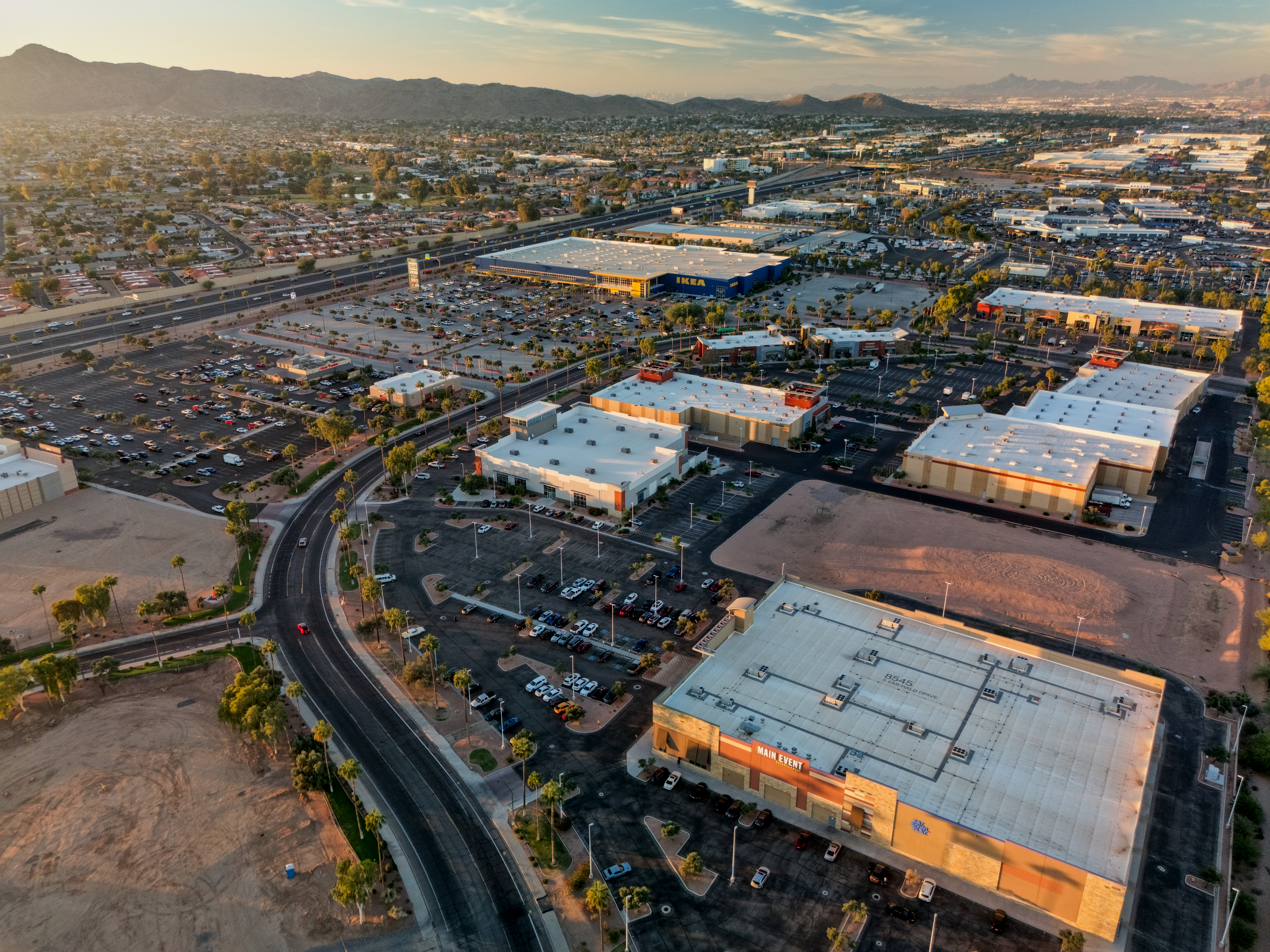
IKEA within the Emerald Center shopping mall, with South Mountain in the distance

One of Arizona's largest shopping malls, Arizona Mills, sits near the border with the town of Guadalupe. The city is the location of the first IKEA branch in Arizona, also near the southern boundary. Tempe Marketplace, a large open air mall featuring live music and water and laser shows, is located just southeast of Tempe Town Lake. Tempe can boast an array of wholesalers and manufacturers. Mill Avenue, located just west of Hayden Butte, is a shopping and entertainment area in the city popular with pedestrians and students. With the completion of Tempe Town Lake, commercial and high-rise development along the reservoir quickly transformed the cityscape of Mill Avenue and the skyline of downtown Tempe.

=== Top employers ===
According to Tempe's Comprehensive Annual Financial Report for the financial year ending June 2020, the top employers in the city are:

#	Employer	Employees
1	Arizona State University	8,010
2	State Farm Insurance	6,550
3	Freedom Financial Network	2,300
4	JPMorgan Chase Bank National Association	2,220
5	ABM Industries Inc	2,000
6	City of Tempe	1,983
7	Honeywell	1,540
8	Total Events Management LLC	1,040
9	Wells Fargo	1,030
10	ADP Inc	1,000
10	Bank of the West	1,000

== Arts and culture ==
=== Tempe Center for the Arts ===
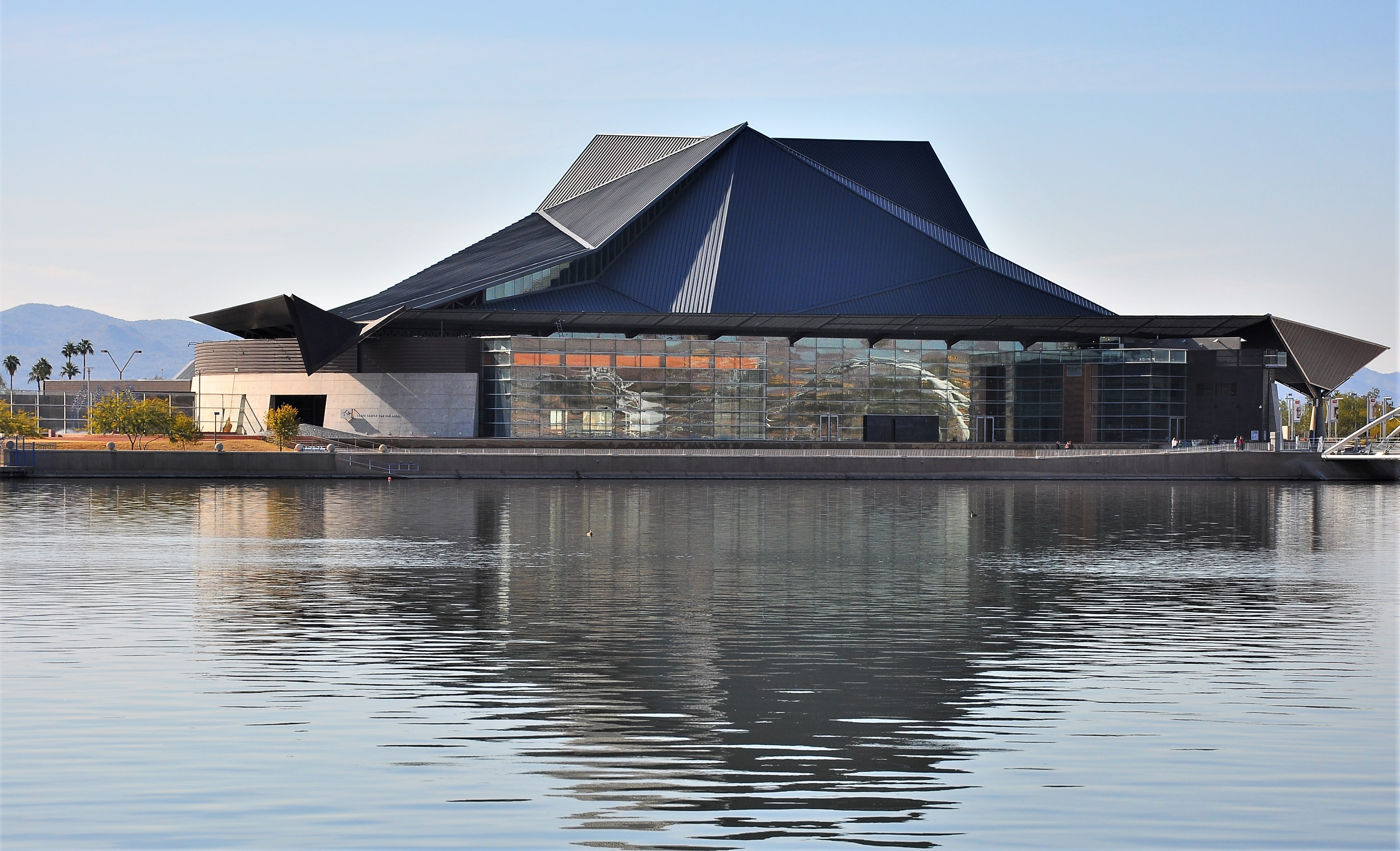
Tempe Center for the Arts

Opened in September 2007, Tempe Center for the Arts (TCA) is a community crown jewel for performing and visual arts. The $65 million venue houses a state-of-the-art 600-seat theater, a 200-seat studio theater, a picturesque 200-seat multi-purpose space, a 3,500-square-foot (330 m^{2}) art gallery.

=== Tempe History Museum ===
The Tempe History Museum explores local history through collections, research services, exhibits, and programs.

=== Public art ===
The Tempe Public Art Program coordinates artists with building designers to install permanent and temporary public art projects. Since 1988, more than 50 projects have been commissioned by the Tempe's Community Services Division. The Art in Private Development ordinance of 1991 has helped add more than 60 privately owned pieces of art to the city, accessible by the public.

=== Live music scene ===
Tempe enjoyed a thriving alternative music scene throughout the 1980s and 1990s, producing acts including as the Gin Blossoms, Meat Puppets, Dead Hot Workshop, The Refreshments, Roger Clyne and the Peacemakers, Hans Olson, The Maine, and Injury Reserve. Historic dive-bar Yucca Tap Room, one of the last remaining "small stage" venues that defined this era, continues to host nightly local live music.

=== Tempe Music Walk ===
The Tempe Music Walk honors select bands, musicians and musical venues with plaques embedded in the sidewalk on Mill Avenue. Honorees are Walt Richardson, The Gin Blossoms, Hans Olson, and Long Wong's.

=== Public libraries ===
Tempe Public Library is the local library. It is located adjacent to the Tempe History Museum.

=== Tourism ===
Many of the reasons people visit Tempe are places and events, such as P. F. Chang's Rock 'n' Roll Arizona Marathon & 1/2 Marathon, Tempe Marketplace, Arizona Mills, Mill Avenue, and Tempe Town Lake.

The Tempe Tourism Office, located on Mill Avenue's downtown district, provides maps and additional information about hotels and upcoming city events.

=== Historic properties ===
There are numerous properties in the city of Tempe which are considered to be historical and have been included either in the National Register of Historic Places.

== Sports ==
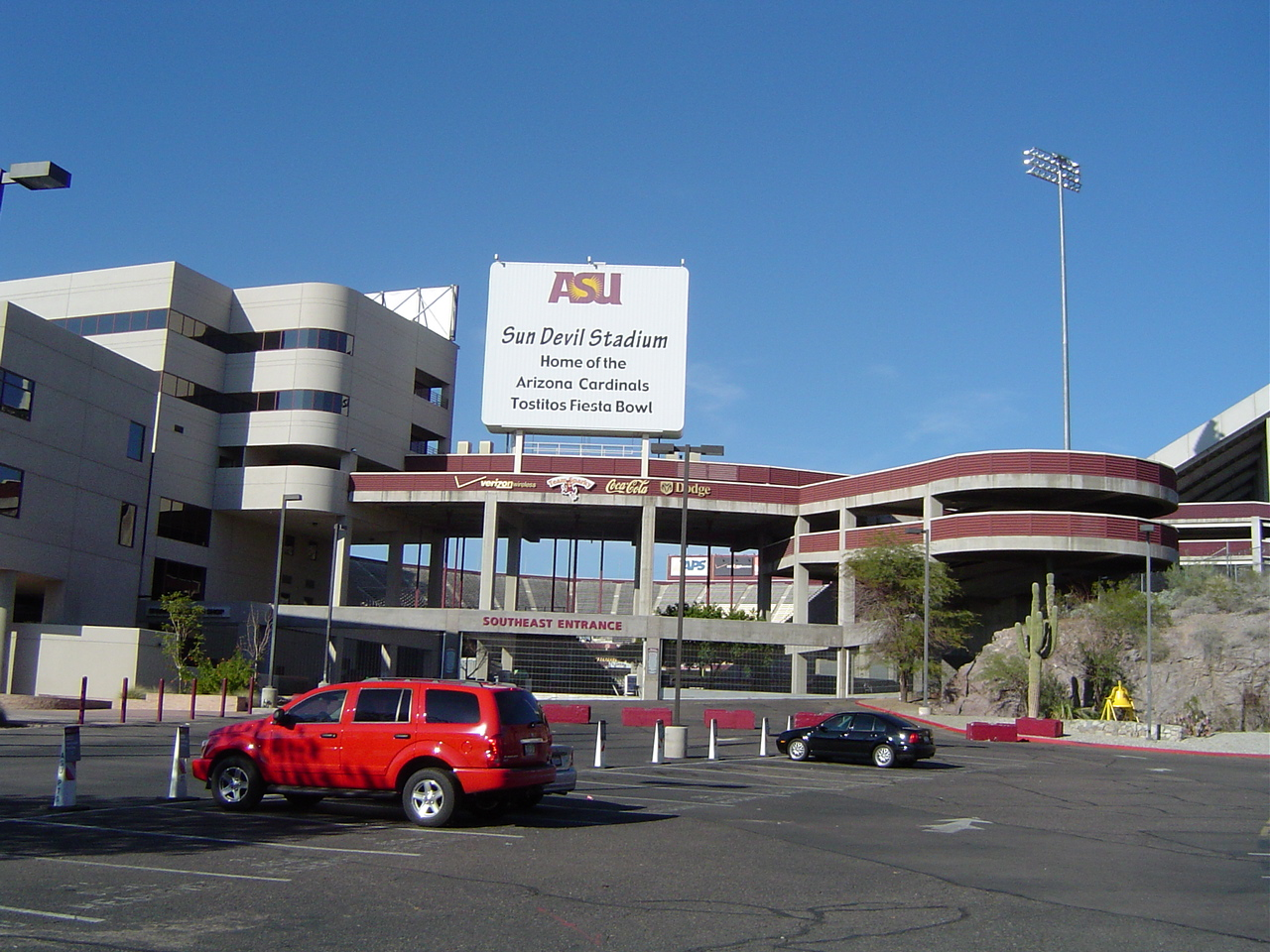
Sun Devil Stadium

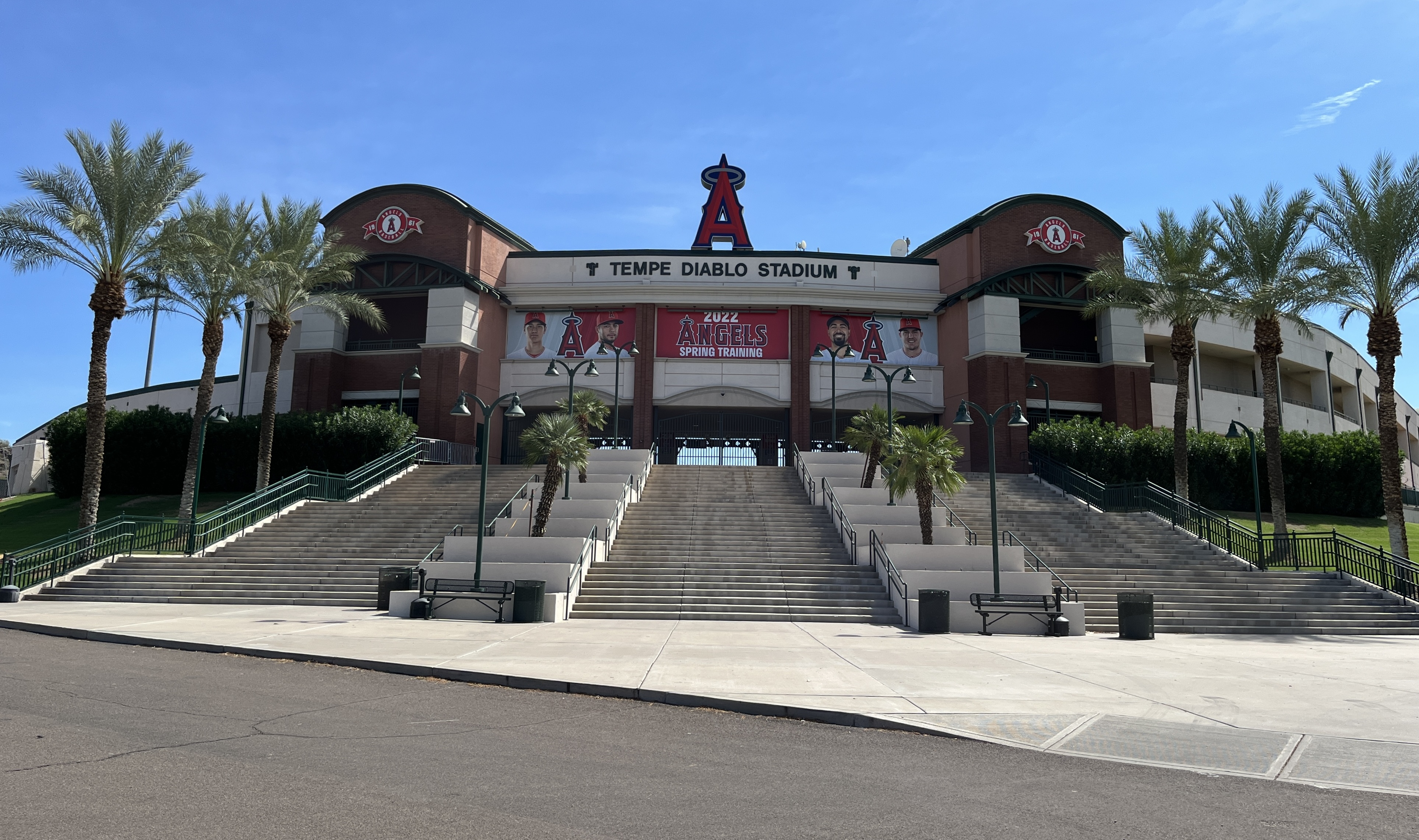
Tempe Diablo Stadium

From 1988 to 2005, Sun Devil Stadium hosted the National Football League's Arizona Cardinals (they were known as the Phoenix Cardinals from 1988 to 1993). The Cardinals have since moved to State Farm Stadium in Glendale for games, but their headquarters are in Tempe until they move to their new facility in north Phoenix in 2028. Many residents follow the teams in nearby Phoenix and Glendale. (For more information, read the sports section on the Phoenix page)

The Arizona State University Sun Devils compete in football, basketball, baseball, as well as a number of other sports in the Big-12 Conference of the NCAA. The Sun Devils football team plays their games at Sun Devil Stadium. Currently as a Division I Independent program, the men's ice hockey team plays at 5,000-seat Mullett Arena. The Sun Devils' nearest rival is the University of Arizona Wildcats, in Tucson. The two teams compete in the "Duel in the Desert" for control of the Territorial Cup. Sun Devil Stadium had hosted the annual Fiesta Bowl until the 2007 game moved to State Farm Stadium.

The Los Angeles Angels have their spring training at Tempe Diablo Stadium, a 9,785-seat ballpark built in 1968. The Angels moved to Tempe in 1993 from Palm Springs, California.

The Arizona Coyotes began using Mullett Arena as their home venue for the 2022–23 National Hockey League season after struggling to find long-term arena agreements in the greater Phoenix area. This was to be a short-term solution until a new arena was built. After several unsuccessful attempts at securing a new arena, the Coyotes played what would ultimately be the franchise's final two seasons in Arizona at Mullett Arena before ceasing operations in 2024 and relocating to Salt Lake City, Utah.

The Arizona Hotshots of the Alliance of American Football played their one season in Tempe in early 2019. The league folded before the season was completed.

Rugby union is a developing sport in Tempe as well as in the Phoenix metropolitan area. The multiple clubs, ranging from men's and women's clubs to collegiate and Under 19, are part of the Arizona Rugby Union. Notable clubs are Arizona State University Rugby Football Club and the Tempe "Old Devils" Rugby Club.

== Parks and recreation ==
Tempe is home to many outdoor activities. Tempe Town Lake is a publicly accessible lake that is run by City of Tempe. The lake provides recreation activities to residents and tourists, but also helps protect the surrounding area from flooding. The City of Tempe estimated that 2.7 million people visited the lake in 2013.

Papago Park and Tempe Butte Desert Preserves offer hiking, mountain and road biking, rock climbing, disc golf, and equestrian activities. Tempe is also home to the annual Ironman Triathlon, which takes place in late November.

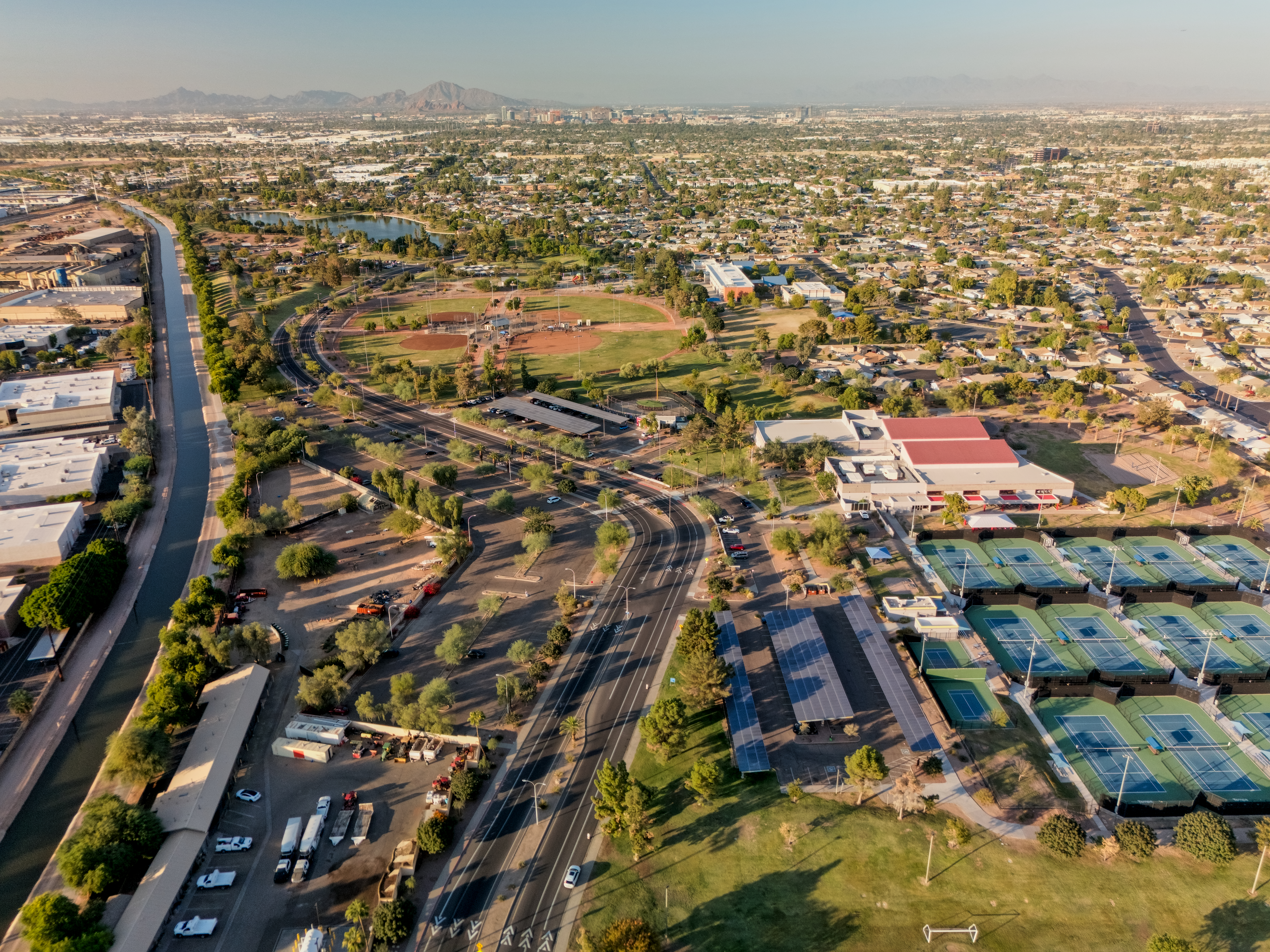
Kiwanis Park, with downtown Tempe in the distance

Tempe has more than 50 neighborhood and community parks, including Kiwanis Park, Tempe Beach Park and Tempe Sports Complex. Kiwanis Park contains Kiwanis Lake, the only indoor wave pool in the Phoenix area, a gymnasium, a batting range, tennis courts, a fitness center, and classroom programs.

== Government ==
- Mayor: Corey Woods
- Vice Mayor: Doreen Garlid
- City Manager: Rosa Inchausti
- Chief of Police: Kenneth McCoy
- Fire Chief: Darrel Duty
- City Attorney: Eric Anderson
- City Council Members: Vice Mayor Doreen Garlid, Councilmembers Jennifer Adams, Nikki Amberg, Arlene Chin, Berdetta Hodge and Randy Keating.

The city has had 33 mayors since 1894.

- 1894–1896: Fenn J. Hart
- 1896–1897: E.A. Murphy
- 1897–1902: John Knight
- 1902–1903: Samuel Brown
- 1903–1912: J.A. Dins
- 1912–1914: Joseph T. Birchett
- 1914–1916: George M. Frizzell
- 1916–1920: J.A. Dins
- 1920–1922: C.M. Woodward
- 1922–1924: Curt W. Miller
- 1924–1926: Garfield A. Goodwin
- 1926–1928: J.L. Felton
- 1928–1930: Hugh E. Laird
- 1930–1932: Thanks Anderson
- 1932–1934: F.E. Ostrander
- 1934–1937: Thanks Anderson
- 1937–1948: W.W. Cole
- 1948–1960: Hugh E. Laird
- 1960–1961: Clyde Gililland
- 1961–1962: Ross R. Rice
- 1962–1963: Bernard R. Caine
- 1963–1964: Harold Andrews
- 1964–1966: John C. Moeur
- 1966–1968: Rudy E. Campbell
- 1968–1970: Elmer Bradley
- 1970–1974: Dale R. Shumway
- 1974–1978: William J. LoPiano
- 1978–1994: Harry Mitchell
- 1994–2004: Neil Giuliano
- 2004–2012: Hugh Hallman
- 2012–2020: Mark Mitchell
- 2020–present: Corey Woods

Tempe is in Arizona's 3rd and 4th congressional districts, which are served by Representatives Yassamin Ansari (D) and Greg Stanton (D), respectively.

== Education ==
Tempe is served by multiple school districts. Most of Tempe is within the Tempe Elementary School District and the Tempe Union High School District; however, other portions are served by the Kyrene School District (K–8), Scottsdale Unified School District (K–12), and Mesa Public Schools (K–12). Tempe has several charter schools, including Tempe Preparatory Academy.

Emmanuel Lutheran School is a Christian Pre-K–8 grade school of the Wisconsin Evangelical Lutheran Synod in Tempe.

Tempe also contains one of the state's three major universities, Arizona State University, the Maricopa County Community College District administrative offices and the headquarters of Rio Salado Community College. Arizona State University is known for its numerous studies and innovations, particularly in the field of science which include furthering the knowledge of certain cancers, business management research, and population science. Tempe is also the home of several other schools, including the University of Phoenix, Brookline College, University of Advancing Technology, Southwest College of Naturopathic Medicine, Southwest Institute of Healing Arts, Bryan University and Lamson Junior College.

== Media ==
- Tempe 11, a local access channel, found on Cox Cable Channel 11.
- KJZZ, an NPR station, is located in Tempe at Rio Salado College.
- KBAQ, a 24/7 member-supported classical radio station, is the only such service in the Phoenix metropolitan area. Sun Sounds, a radio station for the blind, is also located there.
- Tempe Tribune and Times Media Group have offices in Tempe.

Tempe Independent covers Tempe

== Infrastructure ==
=== Transportation ===
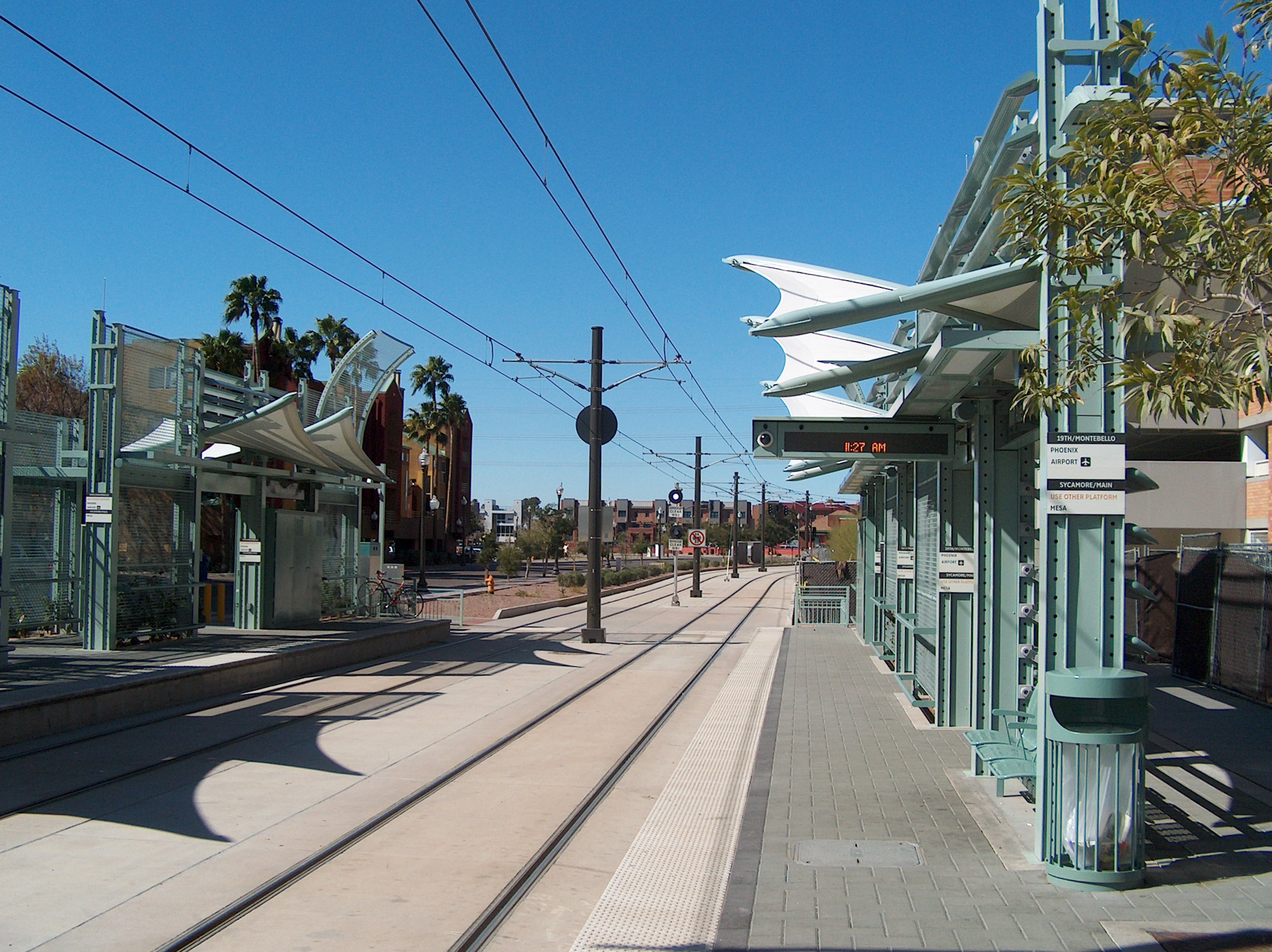
A Tempe station of Valley Metro light rail

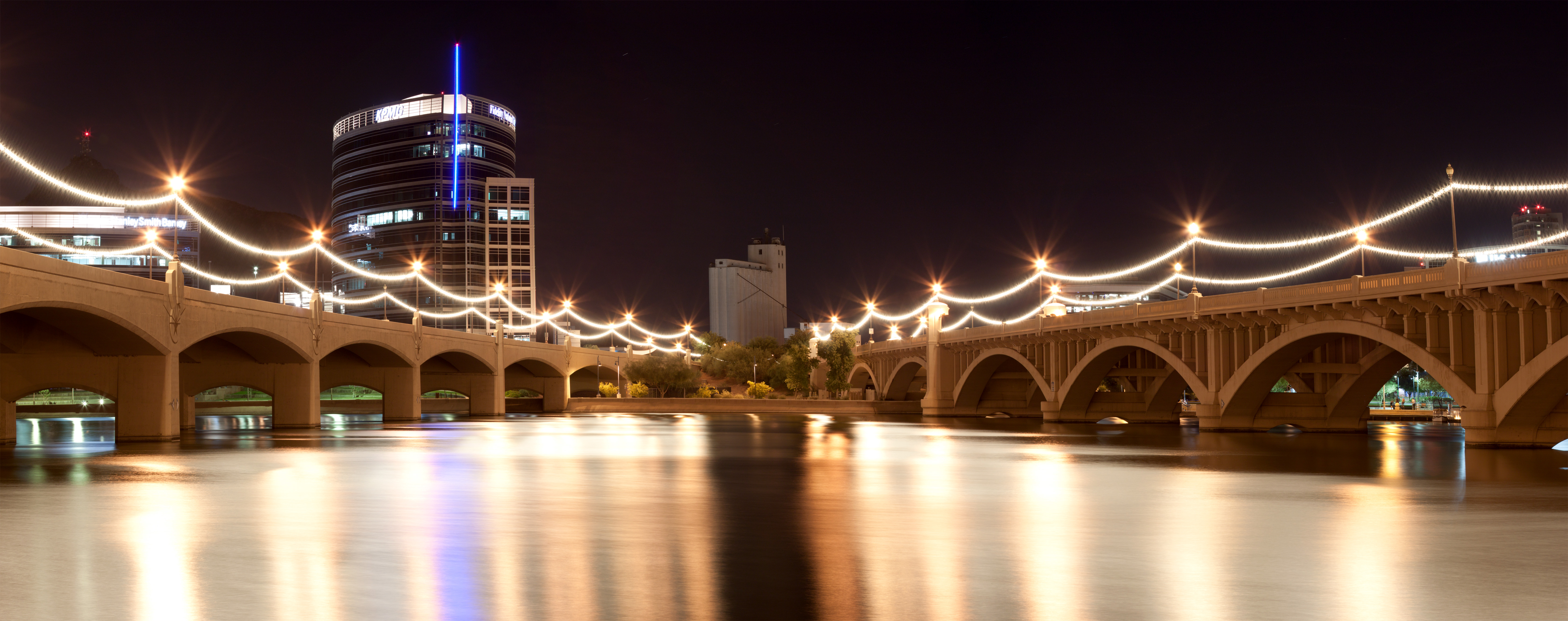
Mill Avenue bridges over Tempe Town Lake at night

Tempe is one of the most densely populated cities in the state and serves as a crossroads for the area's largest communities.

Freeways make up the major transportation system for the Valley. Included in the system surrounding Tempe are Interstate 10 near the western edge as it traverses the Broadway Curve, Loop 202 crossing the northern side, Loop 101 following the eastern border, and U.S. Route 60 running east–west through the center of the city.

Valley Metro operates bus routes and the Valley Metro Rail system that serves Downtown Tempe and Arizona State University, providing service to Phoenix and Mesa. The City of Tempe operates a free neighborhood circulator service called Orbit involving five free shuttle routes near Arizona State University that operate on a regular basis seven days a week. Three other FLASH (Free Local Area Shuttle) circulate in northern Tempe around the university. Tempe residents and commuters make extensive use of public transit and service is offered on a more frequent basis than elsewhere in the greater Phoenix valley, or in the entire state. Most Tempe buses offer 15 minute service during rush hour and 30 minute service throughout the rest of the day.

Phoenix Sky Harbor International Airport, located 2 miles (3.2 km) northwest of Tempe, provides extensive air service to points throughout North America and to London, England, and various cities in Hawaii.

Phoenix-Mesa Gateway Airport is located in Mesa, and offers air service to many additional destinations.

Tempe is one of the few cities in the United States to permit self-driving taxis. Waymo currently offers service within most parts of the city as well as certain other portions of the Valley. In 2018, Tempe was the location of the first reported killing of a pedestrian by a self-driving car, when Elaine Herzberg was struck and killed by a car owned by Uber that was operating in autonomous mode. The incident caused Uber to suspend its self-driving car program nationwide, and its permit to operate in Arizona was revoked.

Tempe is home to the nation's first zero-driving community called Culdesac Tempe which opened in 2023. The $170 million development project will contain 761 apartments, housing 1,000 residents and 16,000 square feet (1,500 m^{2}) of retail, serving as a form of infill development in the city as it is being built on a vacant 17-acre (6.9 ha) lot. In this community, residents are contractually forbidden from parking a vehicle within a 1/4 mile (0.40 km) radius of the area. Prices to live in Culdesac Tempe are projected to be similar to rent prices in the rest of the area and discounted public transport services are included in the monthly rent to allow for residents to travel to other places.

== Notable people ==
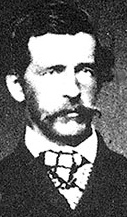
Phillip Darrell Duppa is credited with giving Tempe its name.

- Steven Anderson – pastor of Faithful Word Baptist Church
- Jules Asner – television personality, model, author
- Roger Clyne – musician
- Norman Dubie – poet
- Gabe Freeman – professional basketball player
- Grady Gammage – educator, president of NAU and, later, ASU
- Gin Blossoms – rock band
- Margaret Gisolo – baseball pioneer, dance educator
- Mary Green – first Black property owner in Tempe
- Carl T. Hayden – United States Senator for Arizona, and its first Representative in the House
- Katie Hobbs – 24th and current governor of Arizona since 2023
- Injury Reserve - hip hop group
- Joe Jackson – professional football player
- Frank Kush – college football coach
- Ryan Maifield - professional R/C car driver
- Aaron McCreary – college baseball, basketball and football coach
- The Meat Puppets – rock band
- Harry E. Mitchell – former U.S. Representative
- Paul "P.H." Naffah – musician
- Mike Pollak – professional football player
- Psychostick – comedy rock band
- John H. Pyle – Governor of Arizona from 1951 to 1955.
- The Refreshments – alternative rock band
- Alberto Ríos – poet
- Brooke Schofield - internet personality and podcaster
- Charli Turner Thorne – college basketball coach

== Twin towns and sister cities ==
Tempe has 11 sister cities, as designated by Sister Cities International:

Beaulieu-sur-Mer, Alpes-Maritimes, Provence-Alpes-Côte d'Azur, France
Carlow, Carlow, Ireland
Lower Hutt, New Zealand
Regensburg, Bavaria, Germany
Skopje, North Macedonia
Zhenjiang, Jiangsu, China
Timbuktu, Mali
Cuenca, Ecuador
Cuzco, Peru
Trollhättan, Sweden
Agra City, India

The newest sister city is Agra City, India, as of 2016.

== See also ==
- List of historic properties in Tempe, Arizona
- List of historic properties in Glendale, Arizona
- List of historic properties in Chandler, Arizona
- List of historic properties in Phoenix, Arizona
- Double Butte Cemetery
- List of sundown towns in the United States
